= List of members of Philadelphia City Council since 1952 =

On January 7, 1952, Philadelphia's current city charter took effect. The city council created under that charter consists of seventeen members. Ten are elected from equal-sized districts, and seven are elected at-large in a citywide vote. For the seven at-large seats, each political party may only nominate five candidates and voters may only vote for five. The result of this limited voting system is that at least two of the seven members elected will be from a different party than the other five. Historically, this has resulted in the at-large seats being filled by five Democrats and two Republicans, but in recent elections the Working Families Party has also competed successfully for the two minority seats. The ten district seats are usually held by Democrats, as well, with the exception of District 10, which covers the Far Northeast section of the city. The Democratic party's dominance in the city has resulted in a body with little turnover from year to year, although there have been periods of widespread retirements from City Council, such as during the ABSCAM scandal of the 1980s, or the DROP controversy on the early 2010s.

== 1952–present ==
Session	Election	Council district										At large (7 seats)						
Session	Election	1st	2nd	3rd	4th	5th	6th	7th	8th	9th	10th	At large (7 seats)						
1st (1952–1956)	1951	Thomas I. Guerin	William M. Phillips	Harry Norwitch	Samuel Rose	Raymond Pace Alexander	Michael J. Towey	James Tate	Constance Dallas	Charles M. Finley	John F. Byrne Sr.	Victor E. Moore	Lewis M. Stevens	Victor H. Blanc	James A. Finnegan	Paul D'Ortona	Louis Schwartz	John W. Lord Jr.
1st (1952–1956)	1954 (Note: At-large special election called when John W. Lord Jr. resigned to become a federal judge.)	Thomas I. Guerin	William M. Phillips	Harry Norwitch	Samuel Rose	Raymond Pace Alexander	Michael J. Towey	James Tate	Constance Dallas	Charles M. Finley	John F. Byrne Sr.	Victor E. Moore	Lewis M. Stevens	Victor H. Blanc	James A. Finnegan	Paul D'Ortona	Louis Schwartz	Donald Rubel (Note: Rubel was an independent Republican elected as a Democrat.)
2nd (1956–1960)	1955	Thomas I. Guerin	Gaetano Giordano	Harry Norwitch	Samuel Rose	Raymond Pace Alexander	Michael J. Towey	James Tate	Wilbur H. Hamilton	Charles M. Finley	John M. McDevitt	Victor E. Moore	Henry W. Sawyer	Marshall L. Shepard	John F. Byrne Sr.	Paul D'Ortona	Louis Schwartz	Thomas M. Foglietta
2nd (1956–1960)	1956 (Note: Special election to replace John F. Byrne Sr., who resigned to join the Pennsylvania Turnpike commission.)	vacant (Note: Guerin died in October 1956, but the special election to replace him was not held until November 1957.)	Gaetano Giordano	Harry Norwitch	Samuel Rose	Raymond Pace Alexander	Michael J. Towey	James Tate	Wilbur H. Hamilton	Charles M. Finley	John M. McDevitt	Victor E. Moore	Henry W. Sawyer	Marshall L. Shepard	Leon Kolan-kiewicz	Paul D'Ortona	Louis Schwartz	Thomas M. Foglietta
2nd (1956–1960)	1957 (Note: Special election called for District 1 when Thomas I. Guerin died in office.)	Emanuel Weinberg	Gaetano Giordano	Harry Norwitch	Samuel Rose	Raymond Pace Alexander	Michael J. Towey	James Tate	Wilbur H. Hamilton	Charles M. Finley	John M. McDevitt	Victor E. Moore	Henry W. Sawyer	Marshall L. Shepard	Leon Kolan-kiewicz	Paul D'Ortona	Louis Schwartz	Thomas M. Foglietta
2nd (1956–1960)	1958 (Note: Special election called for District 9 when Charles M. Finley died in office.)	Emanuel Weinberg	Gaetano Giordano	Harry Norwitch	Samuel Rose	Raymond Pace Alexander	Michael J. Towey	James Tate	Wilbur H. Hamilton	Henry P. Carr	John M. McDevitt	Victor E. Moore	Henry W. Sawyer	Marshall L. Shepard	Leon Kolan-kiewicz	Paul D'Ortona	Louis Schwartz	Thomas M. Foglietta
3rd (1960–1964)	1959	Emanuel Weinberg	Gaetano Giordano	Harry Norwitch	Samuel Rose	Thomas McIntosh	Michael J. Towey	James Tate	Alfred Leopold Luongo	Henry P. Carr	John M. McDevitt	Victor E. Moore	Mary Varallo	Marshall L. Shepard	Leon Kolan-kiewicz	Paul D'Ortona	Virginia Knauer	Thomas M. Foglietta
3rd (1960–1964)	1960 (Note: Special election called for vacancies when Samuel Rose and Michael J. Towey died.)	Emanuel Weinberg	Gaetano Giordano	Harry Norwitch	George X. Schwartz	Thomas McIntosh	William A. Dwyer Jr.	James Tate	Alfred Leopold Luongo	Henry P. Carr	John M. McDevitt	Victor E. Moore	Mary Varallo	Marshall L. Shepard	Leon Kolan-kiewicz	Paul D'Ortona	Virginia Knauer	Thomas M. Foglietta
3rd (1960–1964)	1962 (Note: Special election called for vacancies caused when Alfred Leopold Luongo was appointed a federal judge and John M. McDevitt and Victor E. Moore resigned.)	Emanuel Weinberg	Gaetano Giordano	Harry Norwitch	George X. Schwartz	Thomas McIntosh	William A. Dwyer Jr.	vacant (Note: Tate took a leave of absence from council while acting as mayor.)	Stanley B. Smullen	Henry P. Carr	Robert B. Winkelman	Walter S. Pytko	Mary Varallo	Marshall L. Shepard	Leon Kolan-kiewicz	Paul D'Ortona	Virginia Knauer	Thomas M. Foglietta
4th (1964–1968)	1963	Emanuel Weinberg	Gaetano Giordano	Harry Norwitch	George X. Schwartz	Thomas McIntosh	Edward F. McNulty	Joseph J. Hersch	Isadore H. Bellis	Henry P. Carr	David Silver	Walter S. Pytko	Mary Varallo	Marshall L. Shepard	Leon Kolan-kiewicz	Paul D'Ortona	Virginia Knauer	Thomas M. Foglietta
5th (1968–1972)	1967	Benjamin Curcuruto	William Cibotti	Charles L. Durham	George X. Schwartz	Thomas McIntosh	Joseph L. Zazyczny	Joseph J. Hersch	David Cohen	Isadore H. Bellis	David Silver	Edgar C. Campbell	Edward R. Cantor	William F. Boyle	John B. Kelly Jr.	Paul D'Ortona	Thacher Longstreth	Thomas M. Foglietta
5th (1968–1972)	1969 (Note: Special election called for vacancies caused when Benjamin Curcuruto and Joseph J. Hersch died.)	William J. Cottrell	William Cibotti	Charles L. Durham	George X. Schwartz	Thomas McIntosh	Joseph L. Zazyczny	Harry Jannotti	David Cohen	Isadore H. Bellis	David Silver	Edgar C. Campbell	Edward R. Cantor	William F. Boyle	John B. Kelly Jr.	Paul D'Ortona	Thacher Longstreth	Thomas M. Foglietta
6th (1972–1976)	1971	Natale F. Carabello	William Cibotti	Charles L. Durham	George X. Schwartz	Ethel D. Allen	Joseph L. Zazyczny	Harry Jannotti	Joseph E. Coleman	Isadore H. Bellis	Melvin J. Greenberg	Edgar C. Campbell	Edward R. Cantor	William F. Boyle	John B. Kelly Jr.	Francis D. O'Donnell	Beatrice Chernock	Thomas M. Foglietta
7th (1976–1980)	1975	James Tayoun	Anna C. Verna	Lucien E. Blackwell	George X. Schwartz	Cecil B. Moore	Joseph L. Zazyczny	Harry Jannotti	Joseph E. Coleman	Louis Johanson	Melvin J. Greenberg	Earl Vann	Francis X. Rafferty	Al Pearlman	John B. Kelly Jr.	vacant	Beatrice Chernock	Ethel D. Allen
7th (1976–1980)	1976 (Note: Special election called when Francis D. O'Donnell died.)	James Tayoun	Anna C. Verna	Lucien E. Blackwell	George X. Schwartz	Cecil B. Moore	Joseph L. Zazyczny	Harry Jannotti	Joseph E. Coleman	Louis Johanson	Melvin J. Greenberg	Earl Vann	Francis X. Rafferty	Al Pearlman	John B. Kelly Jr.	Charles E. Murray	Beatrice Chernock	Ethel D. Allen
8th (1980–1984)	1979	James Tayoun	Anna C. Verna	Lucien E. Blackwell	George X. Schwartz	John F. Street	Joan L. Krajewski	Harry Jannotti	Joseph E. Coleman	Louis Johanson	Brian J. O'Neill	Augusta Clark	Francis X. Rafferty	Al Pearlman	David Cohen	John C. Anderson	Beatrice Chernock	Joan Specter
8th (1980–1984)	May 1981 (Note: Special election called when George X. Schwartz resigned during the Abscam scandal.)	James Tayoun	Anna C. Verna	Lucien E. Blackwell	Ann J. Land	John F. Street	Joan L. Krajewski	Harry Jannotti	Joseph E. Coleman	Louis Johanson	Brian J. O'Neill	Augusta Clark	Francis X. Rafferty	Al Pearlman	David Cohen	John C. Anderson	Beatrice Chernock	Joan Specter
8th (1980–1984)	Nov 1981 (Note: Special election called when Louis Johanson resigned during the Abscam scandal.)	James Tayoun	Anna C. Verna	Lucien E. Blackwell	Ann J. Land	John F. Street	Joan L. Krajewski	Harry Jannotti	Joseph E. Coleman	John F. White Jr.	Brian J. O'Neill	Augusta Clark	Francis X. Rafferty	Al Pearlman	David Cohen	John C. Anderson	Beatrice Chernock	Joan Specter
9th (1984–1988)	1983	James Tayoun	Anna C. Verna	Lucien E. Blackwell	Ann J. Land	John F. Street	Joan L. Krajewski	Patricia Hughes	Joseph E. Coleman	John F. White Jr.	Brian J. O'Neill	Augusta Clark	Francis X. Rafferty	Al Pearlman	David Cohen	Edward A. Schwartz	Thacher Longstreth	Joan Specter
9th (1984–1988)	Apr. 1984 (Note: Special election called when James Tayoun resigned to run for Congress.)	Leland Beloff	Anna C. Verna	Lucien E. Blackwell	Ann J. Land	John F. Street	Joan L. Krajewski	Patricia Hughes	Joseph E. Coleman	John F. White Jr.	Brian J. O'Neill	Augusta Clark	Francis X. Rafferty	Al Pearlman	David Cohen	Edward A. Schwartz	Thacher Longstreth	Joan Specter
9th (1984–1988)	Nov 1984 (Note: Special election called when Al Pearlman died.)	Leland Beloff	Anna C. Verna	Lucien E. Blackwell	Ann J. Land	John F. Street	Joan L. Krajewski	Patricia Hughes	Joseph E. Coleman	John F. White Jr.	Brian J. O'Neill	Augusta Clark	Francis X. Rafferty	Angel L. Ortiz	David Cohen	Edward A. Schwartz	Thacher Longstreth	Joan Specter
10th (1988–1992)	1987	James Tayoun	Anna C. Verna	Lucien E. Blackwell	Ann J. Land	John F. Street	Joan L. Krajewski	Jack Kelly	Joseph E. Coleman	Marian B. Tasco	Brian J. O'Neill	Augusta Clark	Francis X. Rafferty	Angel L. Ortiz	David Cohen	George R. Burrell	Thacher Longstreth	Joan Specter
11th (1992–1996)	1991	Joe Vignola	Anna C. Verna	Jannie Blackwell	Michael Nutter	John F. Street	Joan L. Krajewski	Daniel P. McElhatton	Herbert H. DeBeary	Marian B. Tasco	Brian J. O'Neill	Augusta Clark	Happy Fernandez	Angel L. Ortiz	David Cohen	James F. Kenney	Thacher Longstreth	Joan Specter
11th (1992–1996)	1994 (Note: Special election called when Herbert H. DeBeary died.)	Joe Vignola	Anna C. Verna	Jannie Blackwell	Michael Nutter	John F. Street	Joan L. Krajewski	Daniel P. McElhatton	Alvin Stewart	Marian B. Tasco	Brian J. O'Neill	Augusta Clark	Happy Fernandez	Angel L. Ortiz	David Cohen	James F. Kenney	Thacher Longstreth	Joan Specter
12th (1996–2000)	1995	Frank DiCicco	Anna C. Verna	Jannie Blackwell	Michael Nutter	John F. Street	Joan L. Krajewski	Richard T. Mariano	Donna Reed Miller	Marian B. Tasco	Brian J. O'Neill	Augusta Clark	Happy Fernandez	Angel L. Ortiz	David Cohen	James F. Kenney	Thacher Longstreth	Frank Rizzo Jr.
13th (2000–2004)	1999	Frank DiCicco	Anna C. Verna	Jannie Blackwell	Michael Nutter	Darrell L. Clarke	Joan L. Krajewski	Richard T. Mariano	Donna Reed Miller	Marian B. Tasco	Brian J. O'Neill	Blondell Reynolds Brown	W. Wilson Goode Jr.	Angel L. Ortiz	David Cohen	James F. Kenney	Thacher Longstreth	Frank Rizzo Jr.
14th (2004–2008)	2003	Frank DiCicco	Anna C. Verna	Jannie Blackwell	Michael Nutter	Darrell L. Clarke	Joan L. Krajewski	Richard T. Mariano	Donna Reed Miller	Marian B. Tasco	Brian J. O'Neill	Blondell Reynolds Brown	W. Wilson Goode Jr.	Juan F. Ramos	David Cohen	James F. Kenney	Jack Kelly	Frank Rizzo Jr.
14th (2004–2008)	2006 (Note: Special election called when Michael Nutter resigned to run for mayor, Richard T. Mariano resigned after a scandal, and David Cohen died.)	Frank DiCicco	Anna C. Verna	Jannie Blackwell	Carol Campbell	Darrell L. Clarke	Joan L. Krajewski	Daniel J. Savage	Donna Reed Miller	Marian B. Tasco	Brian J. O'Neill	Blondell Reynolds Brown	W. Wilson Goode Jr.	Juan F. Ramos	William K. Greenlee	James F. Kenney	Jack Kelly	Frank Rizzo Jr.
15th (2008–2012)	2007	Frank DiCicco	Anna C. Verna	Jannie Blackwell	Curtis J. Jones Jr.	Darrell L. Clarke	Joan L. Krajewski	Maria Quiñones-Sánchez	Donna Reed Miller	Marian B. Tasco	Brian J. O'Neill	Blondell Reynolds Brown	W. Wilson Goode Jr.	Bill Green	William K. Greenlee	James F. Kenney	Jack Kelly	Frank Rizzo Jr.
16th (2012–2016)	2011	Mark Squilla	Kenyatta Johnson	Jannie Blackwell	Curtis J. Jones Jr.	Darrell L. Clarke	Bobby Henon	Maria Quiñones-Sánchez	Cindy Bass	Marian B. Tasco	Brian J. O'Neill	Blondell Reynolds Brown	W. Wilson Goode Jr.	Bill Green	William K. Greenlee	James F. Kenney	Dennis M. O'Brien	David Oh
16th (2012–2016)	2014 (Note: Special election called when Bill Green resigned to join the School Reform Commission.)	Mark Squilla	Kenyatta Johnson	Jannie Blackwell	Curtis J. Jones Jr.	Darrell L. Clarke	Bobby Henon	Maria Quiñones-Sánchez	Cindy Bass	Marian B. Tasco	Brian J. O'Neill	Blondell Reynolds Brown	W. Wilson Goode Jr.	Ed Neilson	William K. Greenlee	James F. Kenney	Dennis M. O'Brien	David Oh
17th (2016–2020)	2015	Mark Squilla	Kenyatta Johnson	Jannie Blackwell	Curtis J. Jones Jr.	Darrell L. Clarke	Bobby Henon	Maria Quiñones-Sánchez	Cindy Bass	Cherelle Parker	Brian J. O'Neill	Blondell Reynolds Brown	Allan Domb	Derek S. Green	William K. Greenlee	Helen Gym	Al Tauben-berger	David Oh
18th (2020–2024)	2019	Mark Squilla	Kenyatta Johnson	Jamie Gauthier	Curtis J. Jones Jr.	Darrell L. Clarke	Bobby Henon	Maria Quiñones-Sánchez	Cindy Bass	Cherelle Parker	Brian J. O'Neill	Kathy Gilmore Richardson	Allan Domb	Derek S. Green	Isaiah Thomas	Helen Gym	Kendra Brooks	David Oh
18th (2020–2024)	May 2022 (Note: Special election called after Bobby Henon resigned following a federal conviction.)	Mark Squilla	Kenyatta Johnson	Jamie Gauthier	Curtis J. Jones Jr.	Darrell L. Clarke	Mike Driscoll	Maria Quiñones-Sánchez	Cindy Bass	Cherelle Parker	Brian J. O'Neill	Kathy Gilmore Richardson	Allan Domb	Derek S. Green	Isaiah Thomas	Helen Gym	Kendra Brooks	David Oh
18th (2020–2024)	Nov 2022 (Note: Special election after Allan Domb, Derek S. Green, Cherelle Parker, and Maria Quiñones-Sánchez resigned to run for mayor.)	Mark Squilla	Kenyatta Johnson	Jamie Gauthier	Curtis J. Jones Jr.	Darrell L. Clarke	Mike Driscoll	Quetcy Lozada	Cindy Bass	Anthony Phillips	Brian J. O'Neill	Kathy Gilmore Richardson	Jim Harrity	Sharon Vaughn	Isaiah Thomas	Helen Gym	Kendra Brooks	David Oh
19th (2024–2028)	2023	Mark Squilla	Kenyatta Johnson	Jamie Gauthier	Curtis J. Jones Jr.	Jeffery Young Jr.	Mike Driscoll	Quetcy Lozada	Cindy Bass	Anthony Phillips	Brian J. O'Neill	Kathy Gilmore Richardson	Jim Harrity	Nina Ahmad	Isaiah Thomas	Rue Landau	Kendra Brooks	Nicolas O'Rourke
Session	Election	1st	2nd	3rd	4th	5th	6th	7th	8th	9th	10th	At large (7 seats)						
Session	Election	Council district										At large (7 seats)						

== See also ==
- List of members of Philadelphia City Council from 1920 to 1952

== Sources ==
- "[Current] Council Members". Philadelphia City Council.
- "A simple list of all the city council members". Philadelphia City Council.
- Sane, Maneesha. "Members of the Philadelphia City Council" (PDF). MANEESHA SANE.
