= 1951 Philadelphia municipal election =

- November 6, 1951

The 1951 Philadelphia municipal election, held on Tuesday, November 6, was the first election under the city's new charter, which had been approved by the voters in April, and the first Democratic victory in the city in more than a half-century. The positions contested were those of mayor and district attorney, and all seventeen city council seats. There was also a referendum on whether to consolidate the city and county governments. Citywide, the Democrats took majorities of over 100,000 votes, breaking a 67-year Republican hold on city government. Joseph S. Clark Jr. and Richardson Dilworth, two of the main movers for the charter reform, were elected mayor and district attorney, respectively. Led by local party chairman James A. Finnegan, the Democrats also took fourteen of seventeen city council seats, and all of the citywide offices on the ballot. A referendum on city-county consolidation passed by a wide margin. The election marked the beginning of Democratic dominance of Philadelphia city politics, which continues today.

== Background ==
In the 1940s, Philadelphia was the last major city in the United States to have nearly all of its political offices occupied by Republicans. Mayor Bernard Samuel and sheriff Austin Meehan led the Republican organization and were supported by many of the city's business interests. In 1947, city voters had elected Republicans to the mayor's office and to every seat on the city council. Over the next few years, cracks in the Republican wall began to emerge as independent voters and reform-minded Republicans began to join with Democrats in opposing what they saw as shortcomings of the Republican political machine. Some in the Democratic coalition objected to making common cause with the reformers, but Democratic City Committee chairman James A. Finnegan saw it as a chance to revitalize his moribund party, saying "good government is good politics."

In 1949, that coalition scored a victory in the election for "row offices" (minor citywide offices including treasurer, coroner, and controller), and the reformers used their new platforms to expose corruption in city government. A bipartisan commission of reformers proposed a new city charter in 1950. The new scheme would shift power away from city council to a strong mayor, something they believed would produce a system that would be more efficient and less susceptible to corruption. It also included provisions for civil service reform, requiring that city jobs be filled by merit selection rather than patronage. The higher-ranking executive branch positions in city government would almost all be filled by the mayor directly without council approval, which was intended to encourage the appointment of independent experts instead of distributing jobs as reward for political service. Voters approved the charter overwhelmingly in an April 1951 referendum, setting up a showdown in November for election to the revised city government.

== Mayor ==
1951 Philadelphia mayoral election
- November 6, 1951
- Turnout: 73%
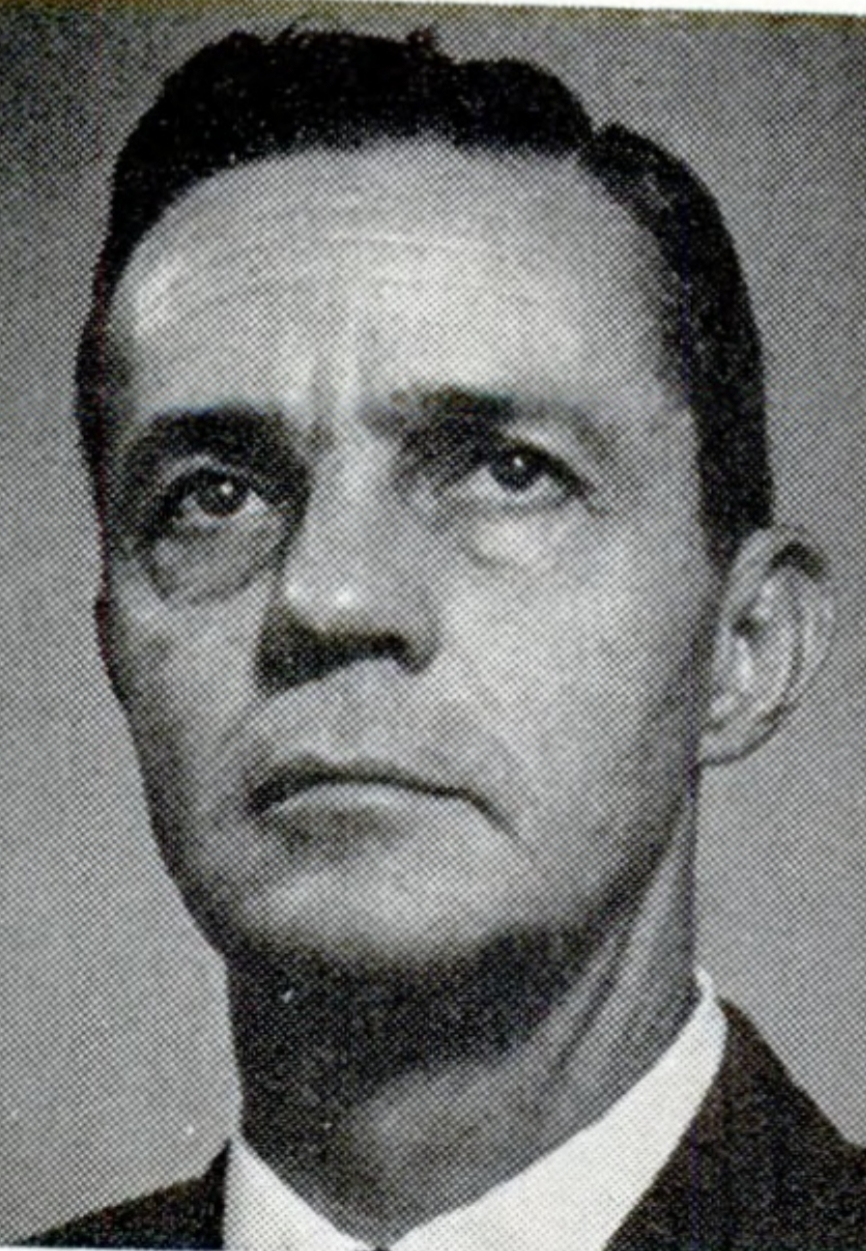

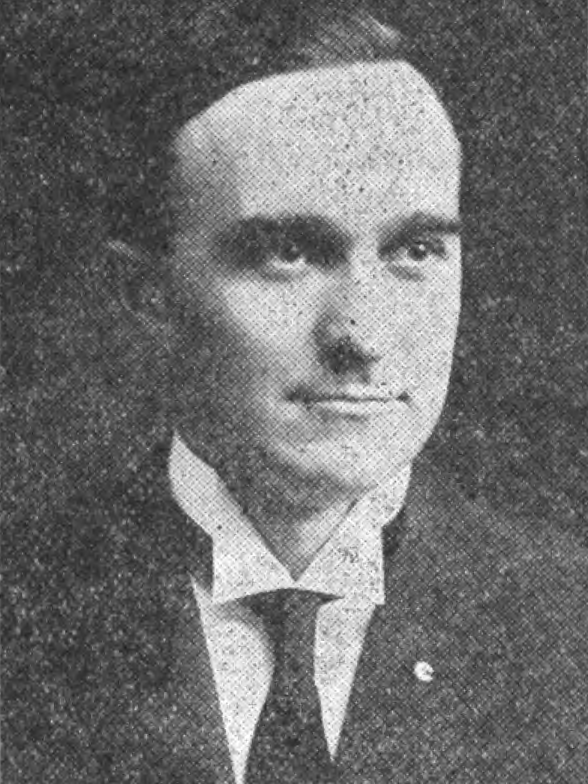
Nominee	Joseph S. Clark Jr.	Daniel A. Poling
Party	Democratic	Republican
Popular vote	448,983	324,283
Percentage	58.06%	41.94%
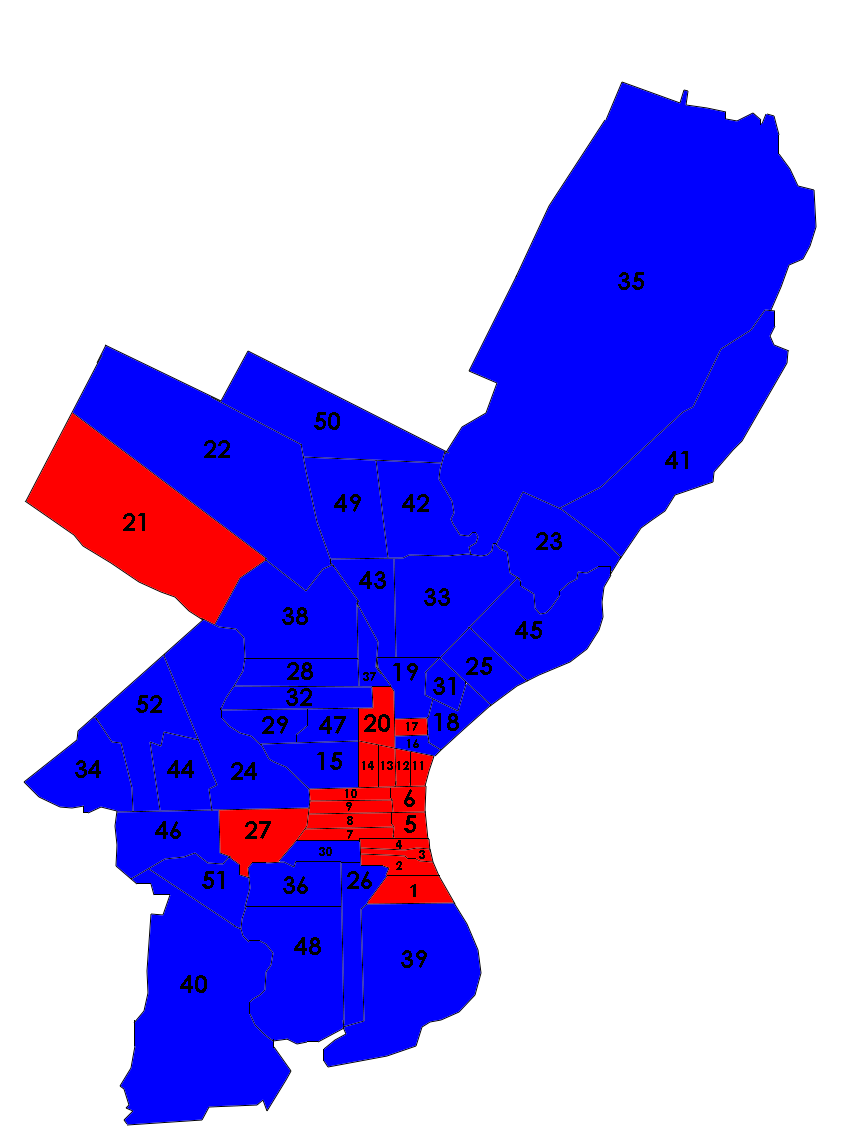
- Ward-level results in the mayor's race, with Clark in blue and Poling in red
Mayor before election
Bernard Samuel
Republican
Elected mayor
Joseph S. Clark Jr.
Democratic

Samuel did not run for re-election as mayor, leaving an open seat to be contested by the Republican nominee, Daniel A. Poling, and the Democrat, Joseph S. Clark Jr. Clark was a lawyer and United States Army officer who had served in World War II. Raised in an upper-class Republican family, he switched his party affiliation to the Democrats in 1928. After several unsuccessful attempts at public office in Philadelphia, he served as a deputy attorney general of Pennsylvania. Clark was known as a reformer, having been elected city controller two years earlier in 1949 on a platform of cleaning up corruption in the city. Despite being slandered as a communist for his membership in the Americans for Democratic Action, a left-wing group, Clark was victorious.

In those two years, Clark probed graft and theft in the Samuel administration and reported his findings to the voters. Many of those accused of crimes were convicted, and several committed suicide. Clark continued his push for reform by urging adoption of the new city charter. He campaigned for mayor with the promise of a "clean sweep of City Hall". He won the support of party Democrats in part by announcing his intention to run whether they backed him or not. In the July primary election, he triumphed easily over former City Solicitor Joseph Sharfsin by an eight-to-one margin.

The Republican nominee, Poling, was a Baptist preacher with a national reputation for integrity who GOP leaders hoped would help deflect the corruption charges leveled against the machine. Poling had worked for various charitable organizations and managed the Christian Herald. His son, Clark V. Poling, was one of the Four Chaplains lost aboard the SS Dorchester in World War II, and Poling served as pastor at the chapel erected in their memory. Poling was challenged in the primary by Walter P. Miller, a businessman who had the backing of independent Republicans. The ward leaders swung their support to Poling, who won by a six-to-one margin.

As in 1947 and 1949, Clark focused his campaign on the corruption of the Republican organization, calling it "the most corrupt political machine in the United States". Poling admitted that corruption existed, but pledged to root it out himself if elected. Philadelphia's two newspapers, the Inquirer and the Bulletin, had traditionally endorsed Republicans, but in 1951 favored the Democrats. Poling's association with the Republican party bosses clinched the Inquirer's endorsement for Clark; in an editorial, the editors said "the only way Philadelphia can get a change at City Hall is by throwing out the Republican ward-boss clique". Clark and his running mate, district attorney candidate Richardson Dilworth, bought radio time and made street-corner speeches. In one speech, Dilworth called the Republican leadership "political hogs and extremely avaricious gentlemen". In a broadcast, Clark called his non-politician opponent the ignorant tool of corrupt interests, saying "he can know nothing about the subject personally for he has not been in politics in Philadelphia long enough to find out." Poling campaigned vigorously with the full support of his party organization, but the effort fell short.

The general election was a landslide for Clark, who won by more than 120,000 votes. With 58% of the vote, the Democrats had gained nearly 215,000 votes over the last election, in which they had been defeated. The Democrats' greatest gains were in the so-called "independent wards", where middle-class voters were more likely to split their tickets in pursuit of good government, and in the majority-black wards in North and West Philadelphia, where Clark's promise of civil service reform gained the confidence of black voters, who had traditionally been left out of the patronage system. As the result became apparent, he told reporters that it was a "great victory for the thinking people of Philadelphia and it ends a long hard fight."

This was the first time since 1881 (70 years) that a Democrat won the mayoralty, and the first time since 1911 (40 years) that a Republican nominee lost the mayoralty. It ushered a period of Democratic control of the mayoralty which continues to this day.

1951 Philadelphia mayoral election
Party	Candidate	Votes	%
Democratic	Joseph S. Clark Jr.	448,983	58.06
Republican	Daniel A. Poling	324,283	41.94

== District attorney ==
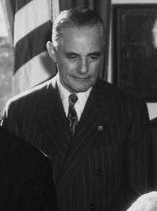
Richardson Dilworth

Philadelphia elects a district attorney independently of the mayor, in a system that predates the charter change. Since 1957, district attorney elections have followed mayoral and city council elections by two years, but in 1951 both offices were up for election in the same year.

As in the mayor's race, the contest for district attorney pitted a Democratic reformer, Richardson Dilworth, against a representative of the Republican machine, Michael A. Foley. Dilworth, like Clark, was a former Republican who had been advocating reform for several years. He had run for mayor unsuccessfully in 1947, with Clark as his campaign manager. In 1949, he was elected City Treasurer. Democratic Party leaders had intended Dilworth to be their candidate for mayor again in 1951, but when Clark announced his candidacy, Dilworth agreed to run for district attorney instead. Foley, an attorney for the Insurance Company of North America, had organization backing in the primary but had no success against the Democratic wave in the general election. Dilworth was unopposed in the primary. In November, Dilworth won by almost as large a margin as Clark, taking just shy of 58% of the vote. He told reporters that the victory had a "sobering effect", adding: "the bigger the victory, the bigger the responsibility".

1951 Philadelphia district attorney election
Party	Candidate	Votes	%
Democratic	Richardson Dilworth	446,841	57.94
Republican	Michael A. Foley	324,433	42.06

== City council ==
Under the new charter, Philadelphians elected a seventeen-member city council in 1951, with ten members representing districts of the city, and the remaining seven being elected at-large. By the rules of the limited voting system for the at-large seats, each political party could nominate five candidates and voters could only vote for five, with the result that the majority party could only take five of the seven seats, leaving two for the minority party. The Democrats' citywide triumph continued into the city council races, as they took nine of ten districts and five of seven at-large seats.

Constance Dallas, the first woman to win election to city council, was elected in a close vote in the 8th district (covering Chestnut Hill, Germantown, and Roxborough) over incumbent councilman Robert S. Hamilton. In the 1st district, which took in South Philadelphia, attorney Thomas I. Guerin defeated Dominic J. Colubiale. In the 2nd, the Republicans' lone district-level victory came as electrical equipment salesman William M. Phillips bested Louis Vignola, a labor union official. In the 3rd district, made up of the southern half of West Philadelphia, incumbent Harry Norwitch defeated another incumbent from the old city council, George Maxman, who had held office since 1936. In the 4th, which covered the northern half of West Philadelphia, state representative Samuel Rose defeated incumbent James G. Clark.

In the city's 5th district in North Philadelphia, another incumbent, Eugene J. Sullivan, was defeated by Raymond Pace Alexander, a local attorney and African American civil rights leader. In the 6th district, covering Kensington and Frankford, plumbers' union official Michael J. Towey won over William J. Glowacz. In the 7th, James Tate defeated Joseph A. Ferko, a local Mummers string band leader. Insurance broker Charles M. Finley defeated incumbent councilman William A. Kelley in the 9th district, which covered Oak Lane, Olney, and Logan. In Northeast Philadelphia's 10th district, incumbent Clarence K. Crossan, who had held office since 1925, went down to defeat against real estate broker John F. Byrne Sr.

In the at-large races, all five Democrats were elected, including city party chairman James A. Finnegan, former registration commissioner Victor E. Moore, Charter Commission secretary Lewis M. Stevens, attorney (and future district attorney of Philadelphia) Victor H. Blanc, and magistrate Paul D'Ortona. The Republican slate ran more than 100,000 votes behind the Democrats, with incumbent councilman Louis Schwartz and state senator John W. Lord Jr. narrowly edging out labor leader John B. Backhus, assistant district attorney Colbert C. McClain, and clergyman Irwin W. Underhill for the two minority party slots on the council. The Progressive Party, a left-wing party founded in 1948 around Henry A. Wallace's presidential bid, ran two candidates who took less than one percent of the vote.

At-large vote share by party
1. Democratic (57.5%)
2. Republican (42.0%)
3. Progressive (0.55%)

1951 Philadelphia city council election, at large
Party	Candidate	Votes	%
Democratic	Victor E. Moore	441,263	11.52
Democratic	Lewis M. Stevens	440,945	11.51
Democratic	Victor H. Blanc	439,942	11.49
Democratic	James A. Finnegan	439,820	11.48
Democratic	Paul D'Ortona	439,534	11.47
Republican	Louis Schwartz (incumbent)	322,224	8.41
Republican	John W. Lord Jr.	321,984	8.41
Republican	John B. Backhus	321,540	8.39
Republican	Irwin W. Underhill	321,434	8.39
Republican	Colbert C. McClain	320,922	8.38
Progressive	Alice F. Liveright	11,193	0.03
Progressive	John L. Holton	9,649	0.03

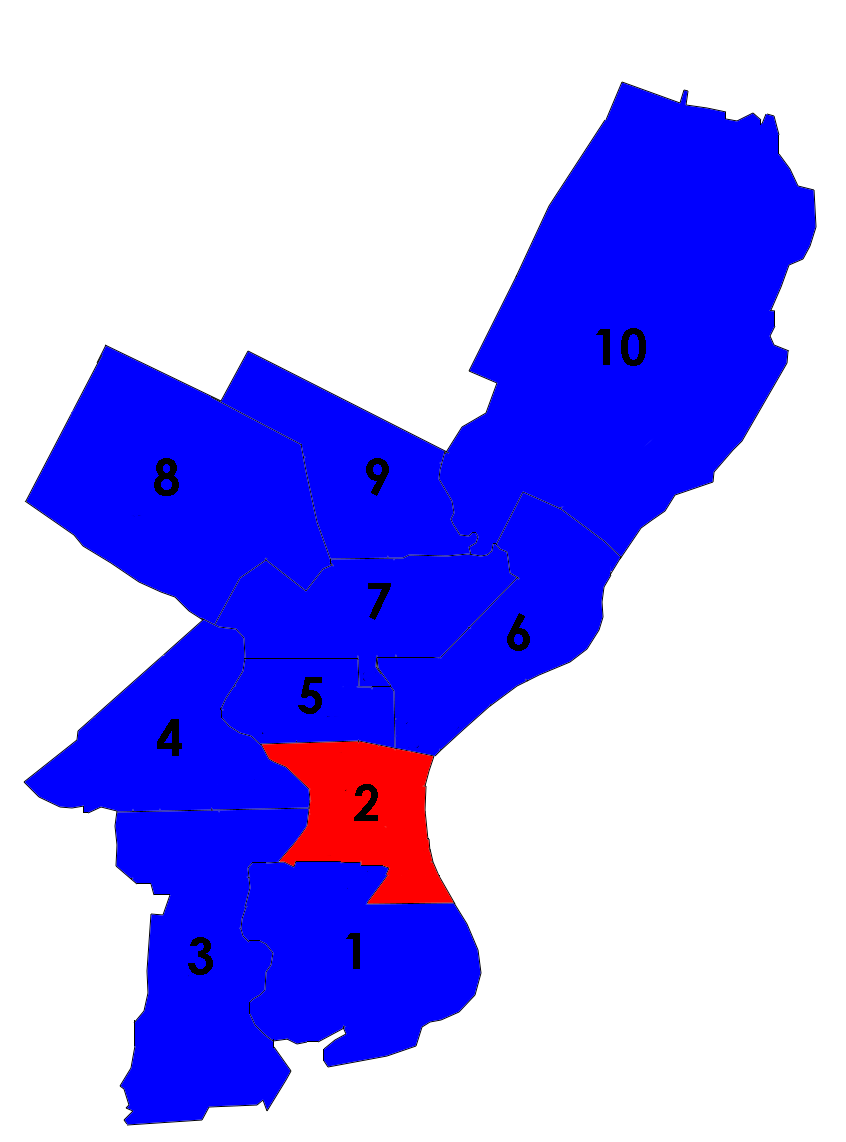
Philadelphia city council districts after the 1951 election (Democrats in blue, Republicans in red)

1951 Philadelphia city council election, district 1
Party	Candidate	Votes	%
Democratic	Thomas I. Guerin	45,859	57.78
Republican	Dominic J. Colubiale	33,511	42.22

1951 Philadelphia city council election, district 2
Party	Candidate	Votes	%
Republican	William M. Phillips	47,814	58.60
Democratic	Louis Vignola	33,783	41.40

1951 Philadelphia city council election, district 3
Party	Candidate	Votes	%
Democratic	Harry Norwitch (incumbent)	50,286	61.77
Republican	George Maxman	31,128	38.23

1951 Philadelphia city council election, district 4
Party	Candidate	Votes	%
Democratic	Samuel Rose	42,797	62.00
Republican	James G. Clark	26,225	38.00

1951 Philadelphia city council election, district 5
Party	Candidate	Votes	%
Democratic	Raymond Pace Alexander	37,918	58.10
Republican	Eugene J. Sullivan (incumbent)	27,340	41.90

1951 Philadelphia city council election, district 6
Party	Candidate	Votes	%
Democratic	Michael J. Towey	47,072	55.05
Republican	William J. Glowacz	38,442	44.95

1951 Philadelphia city council election, district 7
Party	Candidate	Votes	%
Democratic	James Tate	48,139	61.98
Republican	Joseph A. Ferko	29,529	38.02

1951 Philadelphia city council election, district 8
Party	Candidate	Votes	%
Democratic	Constance Dallas	33,751	54.11
Republican	Robert S. Hamilton	28,623	45.89

1951 Philadelphia city council election, district 9
Party	Candidate	Votes	%
Democratic	Charles M. Finley	49,278	63.38
Republican	William A. Kelley (incumbent)	28,476	36.62

1951 Philadelphia city council election, district 10
Party	Candidate	Votes	%
Democratic	John F. Byrne Sr.	50,083	60.36
Republican	Clarence K. Crossan (incumbent)	32,890	39.64

== City commissioners ==
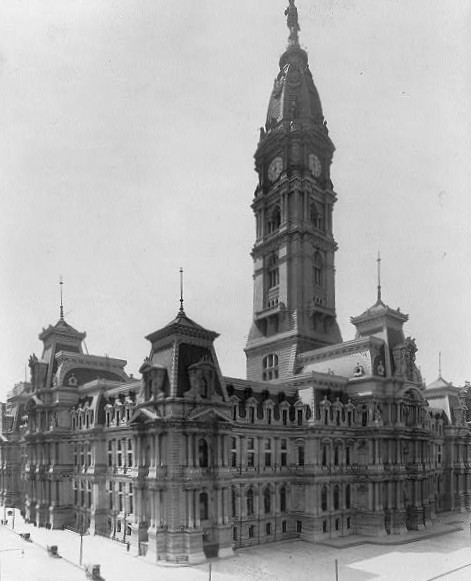
Philadelphia's City Hall

In the race for city commissioners, each party nominates two candidates and the top three are elected. The office was a county office, a holdover from the time before consolidation of the townships in Philadelphia County into one city. The most important of the remaining duties of the commissioners in Philadelphia was the conduct of the city's elections; they also had responsibility for regulating weights and measures. As in the other races, the Democrats triumphed, electing both Maurice S. Osser and Thomas P. McHenry. McHenry was an incumbent who had served as commissioner since 1945, while Osser was new to the office, having previously worked as a lawyer and as the leader of the 16th ward. The Republican spot on the county commission went to Walter I. Davidson, a sales executive.

Philadelphia city commissioners, 1951
Party	Candidate	Votes	%
Democratic	Thomas P. McHenry	441,499	28.88
Democratic	Maurice S. Osser	441,407	28.87
Republican	Walter I. Davidson	323,143	21.14
Republican	William G. Schmidt	322,834	21.12

== Row offices and judges ==
The Democrats' success continued down the ballot. The incumbent sheriff, Austin Meehan, did not run for re-election, and the race for county sheriff pitted two incumbent city councilmen against each other for the job: Democrat William M. Lennox and Republican Cornelius S. Deegan Jr. The office of sheriff was another holdover county office. The sheriff, whose job differed from that of the chief of police, was the chief law enforcement officer of the court. Lennox came out ahead, and would hold the job for the next twenty years.

Democrat Joseph A. Scanlon was elected over Republican Edward W. Furia for clerk of courts, an officer charged with the collection and disbursement of payments ordered by the courts. Scanlon, a former state legislator, served as clerk until 1957, when he died in office. For recorder of deeds, another county administrative office, Democrat Marshall L. Shepard was elected. Shepard was a Baptist minister who had also served as recorder of deeds in Washington, D.C. Two years later, the office was folded into the city government and converted to a civil service position.

Most of the common pleas court judges up for re-election were endorsed by both parties, but in the one contested race, Democrat John Morgan Davis defeated incumbent Republican Thomas Bluett. The Democrats also took eight of the fourteen magisterial district judge positions (a local court, the duties of which are now performed by the Philadelphia Municipal Court).

Philadelphia sheriff election, 1951
Party	Candidate	Votes	%
Democratic	William M. Lennox	443,832	57.15
Republican	Cornelius S. Deegan Jr.	322,832	42.85

Philadelphia clerk of courts election, 1951
Party	Candidate	Votes	%
Democratic	Joseph A. Scanlon	441,223	57.77
Republican	Edward W. Furia	322,480	42.23

Philadelphia recorder of deeds election, 1951
Party	Candidate	Votes	%
Democratic	Marshall L. Shepard	441,302	57.59
Republican	F. Earl Reed	324,951	42.41

== Referendum ==
A statewide referendum on the ballot that day continued the work begun by the new city charter in asking voters to consolidate the city and county governments in Philadelphia. In 1854, all of the municipalities in Philadelphia County had been consolidated into one city, but many county offices still existed, duplicating the efforts of city officials. The merger would also bring county offices under the civil service protections of the new city charter. Merging the city and county governments had been defeated in a 1937 referendum, but in 1951 the question was overwhelmingly approved. Two other ballot proposals authorized the city to borrow $17 million for municipal improvements and $14 million for the gas works; both passed by a five-to-one margin.

== Aftermath ==
The 1951 election was the final blow to Philadelphia's once-dominant Republican machine. After winning some minor offices in 1953, the Republican organization quickly declined again. Since that time, the Democratic Party has dominated the city's politics, with no other party electing a mayor or a majority of the city council. With Republicans no longer playing a significant role in Philadelphia's government, the main battle in city politics came to be between the Democratic Party's reformers and its organization stalwarts. By 1965, with most reformers out of government, the ascendant political culture in the city returned to what the Philadelphia Bulletin called "the old, narrow partisan view, the aroma of inside deals, back-scratching, and City Hall favoritism ... crass political bidding for favor at taxpayers' expense."

== See also ==
- List of members of Philadelphia City Council since 1952

== Sources ==
=== Books ===
- Binzen, Peter (2014). Richardson Dilworth: Last of the Bare-Knuckled Aristocrats. Philadelphia, Pennsylvania: Camino Books. ISBN 978-1-933822-86-0.
- Bulletin Almanac 1952. Philadelphia, Pennsylvania: The Philadelphia Bulletin. 1952. OCLC 8641470.
- Clark, Joseph S.; Clark, Dennis J. (1982). "Rally and Relapse: 1946–1968". In Weigley, Russell (ed.). Philadelphia: A 300-Year History. New York: W.W. Norton & Co. pp. 649–703. ISBN 978-0-393-01610-9.
- Crumlish, Joseph D. (1959). A City Finds Itself: the Philadelphia Home Rule Charter Movement. Wayne State University studies. Political science; no. 6. Detroit, Michigan: Wayne State University Press. OCLC 491418011.
- Feller, Wende Vyborney (2007). "Poling, Daniel Alfred (1884–1968)". In Shearer, Benjamin F. (ed.). Home Front Heroes: A Biographical Dictionary of Americans During Wartime. Vol. 3. Westport, Connecticut: Greenwood Press. pp. 676–677. ISBN 978-0-313-33423-8.
- Freedman, Robert L. (1963). A Report on Politics in Philadelphia. Cambridge, Massachusetts: Joint Center for Urban Studies of the Massachusetts Institute of Technology and Harvard University. OCLC 1690059.
- Murphy, Larry G.; Melton, J. Gordon; Ward, Gary L., eds. (1993). "Shepard, Marshall Lorenzo, Sr". Encyclopedia of African American Religions. New York: Routledge. ISBN 978-0-8153-0500-2.
- Office of the City Representative (1962). Decade of Progress : The story of Philadelphia, 1952–1961. Division of Public Information, Office of the City Representative. OCLC 11471789.
- Petshek, Kirk R. (1973). The Challenge of Urban Reform. Philadelphia, Pennsylvania: Temple University Press. ISBN 978-0-87722-058-9.
- Reichly, James (1959). The Art of Government: Reform and Organization Politics in Philadelphia. A report to the Fund for the Republic. New York: Fund for The Republic. OCLC 994205.

=== Journals ===
- Clark, George R. (March 1991). "Joseph Sill Clark (October 21, 1901 – January 12, 1990)". Proceedings of the American Philosophical Society. 135 (1): 92–97. JSTOR 987153.
- Madonna, G. Terry; McLarnon, John Morrison (January 2003). "Reform in Philadelphia: Joseph S. Clark, Richardson Dilworth and the Women Who Made Reform Possible, 1947–1949" (PDF). Pennsylvania Magazine of History and Biography. CXXVII (1): 57–88. JSTOR 20093600.
- Madonna, G. Terry; McLarnon, John Morrison (November 2011). "Dilworth, Clark, and Reform in Philadelphia, 1947–1962". Pennsylvania Legacies. 11 (2): 24–31. doi:10.5215/pennlega.11.2.0024. JSTOR 10.5215/pennlega.11.2.0024.

=== Newspapers ===
- "Dr. Poling Dies at 83; Clergyman". Delaware County Daily Times. Associated Press. February 8, 1968 – via Newspapers.com.
- Miller, Joseph H. (November 5, 1947). "Samuel Wins By 93,000". The Philadelphia Inquirer – via Newspapers.com.
- Miller, Joseph H. (April 18, 1951a). "Independents Play Decisive Role in Victory". The Philadelphia Inquirer – via Newspapers.com.
- Miller, Joseph H. (July 25, 1951b). "Poling and Clark Are Nominated". The Philadelphia Inquirer. pp. 1, 12 – via Newspapers.com.
- Miller, Joseph H. (October 25, 1951c). "'Corrupt GOP Machine' Reviled By Clark; Poling Confirms 'Mace' Charge". The Philadelphia Inquirer. pp. 1, 2 – via Newspapers.com.
- "Poling's Backers Knife City Reforms". The Philadelphia Inquirer. November 4, 1951. p. 14-B – via Newspapers.com.
- "Democrats End 67-Year GOP Rule in Philadelphia". Delaware County Daily Times. November 7, 1951 – via Newspapers.com.
- "Woman Elected to First Seat in City Council". The Philadelphia Inquirer. November 7, 1951. p. 2 – via Newspapers.com.
- "City and County Merger Believed OK'd by Voters". The Philadelphia Inquirer. November 7, 1951 – via Newspapers.com.
- Miller, Joseph H. (November 7, 1951d). "Democrats win by 122,000". The Philadelphia Inquirer – via Newspapers.com.
- "Bluett Vote Tops Entire GOP Ticket". The Philadelphia Inquirer. December 5, 1951. p. 9 – via Newspapers.com.
- "Joseph Scanlon Dies, Court Clerk, Democrat". The Philadelphia Inquirer. April 22, 1957. p. 22 – via Newspapers.com.
- "Dr. Poling Dies at 83; Clergyman". Delaware County Daily Times. Associated Press. February 8, 1968 – via Newspapers.com.
- Neal, Steve (January 15, 1990). "Political Giant Joseph Clark Dead at 88". The Philadelphia Inquirer – via Newspapers.com.
- Roche, Walter F. (October 8, 1991). "William M. Lennox, 91, sheriff from 1952-72, later hospice volunteer". The Philadelphia Inquirer. p. 7-B – via Newspapers.com.
