= List of members of Philadelphia City Council from 1920 to 1952 =

In 1919, Philadelphia adopted a new city charter. Among the changes enacted was a reduction of the size of the two-chambered, 190-member City Council to a unicameral, smaller body. The city was divided into eight districts, which elected multiple members based on their relative populations. The system stayed in place until 1951, when a new city charter changed the system to a different model.

== 1920 – 1952 ==
Sess.	Elec.	Council District																								
Sess.	Elec.	1st			2nd		3rd		4th					5th		6th				7th			8th			
1st (1920–1924)	1919	Edwin R. Cox	Joseph P. Gaffney	William E. Finley	William McCoach	Charles B. Hall	Isaac D. Hetzell	One seat 1920-1928	David G. Franken-field	Francis F. Burch	George Connell	James A. Develin	Four seats 1920-1932	Edward Buchholz	Simon Walter	William W. Roper	Sigmund J. Gans	Charles H. von Tagen	Three seats 1920-1932	Alexis J. Limeburner	Richard Weglein	Hugh L. Mont-gomery	William R. Horn	Robert J. Patton	John J. McKinley	Three seats 1920-1932
1st (1920–1924)	1920 (Note: Special election called when William E. Finley died.)	Edwin R. Cox	Joseph P. Gaffney	Charles J. Pommer	William McCoach	Charles B. Hall	Isaac D. Hetzell	One seat 1920-1928	David G. Franken-field	Francis F. Burch	George Connell	James A. Develin	Four seats 1920-1932	Edward Buchholz	Simon Walter	William W. Roper	Sigmund J. Gans	Charles H. von Tagen	Three seats 1920-1932	Alexis J. Limeburner	Richard Weglein	Hugh L. Mont-gomery	William R. Horn	Robert J. Patton	John J. McKinley	Three seats 1920-1932
2nd (1924–1928)	1923	Edwin R. Cox	Bernard Samuel	Charles J. Pommer	William McCoach	Charles B. Hall	Isaac D. Hetzell	One seat 1920-1928	David G. Franken-field	Benjamin H. Fields	George Connell	Maurice E. Levick	Four seats 1920-1932	Frederic D. Garman	Simon Walter	William W. Roper	Sigmund J. Gans	Howard R. Smith	Three seats 1920-1932	James G. Carson	Morris Apt	Two seats 1924-1928	Clarence K. Crossan	John J. Daly	John J. McKinley	Three seats 1920-1932
3rd (1928–1932)	1927	Edwin R. Cox	Bernard Samuel	Charles J. Pommer	William McCoach	Charles B. Hall	Isaac D. Hetzell	William F. Nickel	David G. Franken-field	Benjamin H. Fields	George Connell	Maurice E. Levick	Four seats 1920-1932	Frederic D. Garman	Simon Walter	William W. Roper	Clarence Blackburn	Howard R. Smith	Three seats 1920-1932	James G. Carson	Morris Apt	Wyndam Bryant	Clarence K. Crossan	John J. Daly	John J. McKinley	Three seats 1920-1932
3rd (1928–1932)	1928 (Note: Special election called when William McCoach died.)	Edwin R. Cox	Bernard Samuel	Charles J. Pommer	Henry J. Trainer	Charles B. Hall	Isaac D. Hetzell	William F. Nickel	David G. Franken-field	Benjamin H. Fields	George Connell	Maurice E. Levick	Four seats 1920-1932	Frederic D. Garman	Simon Walter	William W. Roper	Clarence Blackburn	Howard R. Smith	Three seats 1920-1932	James G. Carson	Morris Apt	Wyndam Bryant	Clarence K. Crossan	John J. Daly	John J. McKinley	Three seats 1920-1932
4th (1932–1936)	1931	Edwin R. Cox	Bernard Samuel	Charles J. Pommer	Henry J. Trainer	One seat 1928-1952	Phineas T. Green	One seat 1928-1952	David G. Franken-field	Edward A. Kelly	George Connell	Maurice E. Levick	James G. Clark	Frederic D. Garman	Simon Walter	William W. Roper	Clarence Blackburn	Frank L. Kenworthy	Richard S. Harris	Two seats 1932-1952	Morris Apt	Wyndam Bryant	Clarence K. Crossan	John J. Daly	John J. McKinley	John N. Costello
4th (1932–1936)	1934 (Note: Special election called when William Roper died.)	Edwin R. Cox	Bernard Samuel	Charles J. Pommer	Henry J. Trainer	One seat 1928-1952	Phineas T. Green	One seat 1928-1952	David G. Franken-field	Edward A. Kelly	George Connell	Maurice E. Levick	James G. Clark	Frederic D. Garman	Simon Walter	Samuel Emlen	Clarence Blackburn	Frank L. Kenworthy	Richard S. Harris	Two seats 1932-1952	Morris Apt	Wyndam Bryant	Clarence K. Crossan	John J. Daly	John J. McKinley	John N. Costello
5th (1936–1940)	1935	Arthur P. Keegan	Bernard Samuel	Charles J. Pommer	Henry J. Trainer	One seat 1928-1952	Phineas T. Green	One seat 1928-1952	George Maxman	Edward A. Kelly	George Connell	James H. Irvin	James G. Clark	Frederic D. Garman	Louis Schwartz	Samuel Emlen	Clarence Blackburn	William A. Kelley	William G. Simons	Two seats 1932-1952	Patrick Conner	Alexander C. Green	Clarence K. Crossan	John J. Daly	John L. Fox	Thomas P. Stokley
5th (1936–1940)	1936 (Note: Special election called when Samuel Emlen died.)	Arthur P. Keegan	Bernard Samuel	Charles J. Pommer	Henry J. Trainer	One seat 1928-1952	Phineas T. Green	One seat 1928-1952	George Maxman	Edward A. Kelly	George Connell	James H. Irvin	James G. Clark	Frederic D. Garman	Louis Schwartz	Thomas Z. Minehart	Clarence Blackburn	William A. Kelley	William G. Simons	Two seats 1932-1952	Patrick Conner	Alexander C. Green	Clarence K. Crossan	John J. Daly	John L. Fox	Thomas P. Stokley
6th (1940–1944)	1939	Joseph J. Milligan	Bernard Samuel	Charles J. Pommer	Bill Hollen-back	One seat 1928-1952	Phineas T. Green	One seat 1928-1952	George Maxman	Charles O'Halloran	L. Wallace Egan	James H. Irvin	James G. Clark	Frederic D. Garman	Louis Schwartz	John J. McDevitt	Robert S. Hamilton	William A. Kelley	William G. Simons	Two seats 1932-1952	Eugene J. Hagerty	Thomas D. Allen	Clarence K. Crossan	George D. Mansfield	John A. Mawhinney	Thomas P. Stokley
7th (1944–1948)	1943	Joseph J. Milligan	Louis Menna	Frank X. O'Connor	Henry J. Trainer	One seat 1928-1952	Phineas T. Green	One seat 1928-1952	George Maxman	Charles O'Halloran	L. Wallace Egan	James H. Irvin	James G. Clark	Frederic D. Garman	Louis Schwartz	John J. McDevitt	Robert S. Hamilton	William A. Kelley	George W. Rue	Two seats 1932-1952	Eugene J. Hagerty	Eugene J. Sullivan	Clarence K. Crossan	George D. Mansfield	Cornelius S. Deegan	David E. Jamieson
8th (1948–1952)	1947	Joseph J. Milligan	Louis Menna	Frank X. O'Connor	Michael Foglietta	One seat 1928-1952	Phineas T. Green	One seat 1928-1952	George Maxman	Charles O'Halloran	L. Wallace Egan	Woodie Armstrong	James G. Clark	Frederic D. Garman	Louis Schwartz	John J. McDevitt	Robert S. Hamilton	William A. Kelley	Albert T. Flavell	Two seats 1932-1952	Alexander C. Green	Eugene J. Sullivan	Clarence K. Crossan	George D. Mansfield	Cornelius S. Deegan	David E. Jamieson
8th (1948–1952)	1949 (Note: Special election called when Frank X. O'Connor and L. Wallace Egan died.)	Joseph J. Milligan	Louis Menna	Maxwell Seidman	Michael Foglietta	One seat 1928-1952	Phineas T. Green	One seat 1928-1952	George Maxman	Charles O'Halloran	Harry Norwitch	Woodie Armstrong	James G. Clark	Frederic D. Garman	Louis Schwartz	John J. McDevitt	Robert S. Hamilton	William A. Kelley	Albert T. Flavell	Two seats 1932-1952	Alexander C. Green	Eugene J. Sullivan	Clarence K. Crossan	George D. Mansfield	Cornelius S. Deegan	David E. Jamieson
8th (1948–1952)	1950 (Note: Special election called when Charles O'Halloran died.)	Joseph J. Milligan	Louis Menna	vacant	Michael Foglietta	One seat 1928-1952	Phineas T. Green	One seat 1928-1952	George Maxman	William M. Lennox	Harry Norwitch	Woodie Armstrong	James G. Clark	Frederic D. Garman	Louis Schwartz	John J. McDevitt	Robert S. Hamilton	William A. Kelley	Albert T. Flavell	Two seats 1932-1952	Alexander C. Green	Eugene J. Sullivan	Clarence K. Crossan	George D. Mansfield	Cornelius S. Deegan	David E. Jamieson

== See also ==
- List of members of Philadelphia City Council since 1952
