= William M. Phillips =

American politician (1900–1962)

William M. Phillips

William Milton Phillips (September 20, 1900 – June 9, 1962) was a Republican businessman and politician from Philadelphia.

Phillips was born in Philadelphia in 1900 to David and Sally Phillips, and was a descendant of Declaration of Independence signer Samuel Chase. He graduated from Northeast High School in Philadelphia and attended the West Philadelphia Commercial School, a private business academy. He married Marian E. Thompson and had one daughter, Patricia. He worked in sales for the Narragansett Wire Company and became involved in local Republican politics.

In the 1951 municipal election, Phillips worked with an independent faction of Republicans for the mayoral nomination of Walter P. Miller, who lost to minister Daniel A. Poling, and for the district attorney nomination of Raymond A. Speiser, who also lost. Nevertheless, members of the independent faction of the Republican political machine loyal to Miller and Speiser were able to secure Phillips's nomination to City Council's 2nd district when incumbent Michael Foglietta withdrew from the race.

That year, Philadelphia had adopted a new city charter and Democrats swept to victory in mayoral and city council races, breaking the Republicans' 67-year-long control of city government. The Democratic party was led by a reform faction that attracted the votes of many Republicans disappointed in political corruption under their party's leadership. In the ten city council district races, only Phillips was successful for the Republicans.

While on the Council, Phillips called for investigation into the Pennsylvania Railroad's vast land holdings in Center City Philadelphia, which many saw as an obstacle to expansion of the city's business district. In 1954, Phillips joined with Democrats James Tate and Michael J. Towey in attempting to weaken the civil service reform of the new charter, but they were unsuccessful. In the election the next year, Phillips considered running for reelection, but withdrew in favor of lawyer David Zwanetz. Zwanetz went on to lose to Democrat Gaetano Giordano.

In 1958, Phillips ran for the Republican nomination to Congress in Pennsylvania's 3rd district, but lost to James T. McDermott by a substantial margin. In 1962, he died of a pulmonary embolism at Roxborough Memorial Hospital. He was buried in Northwood Cemetery.

== Sources ==
- "Death certificate". Ancestry.com.
- Kohler, Saul (May 21, 1958). "Nix's Double Victory in House Contest Blow To Clark". The Philadelphia Inquirer. p. 3 – via Newspapers.com.
- Miller, Joseph H. (September 8, 1951). "2nd District GOP Selects Phillips". The Philadelphia Inquirer. p. 5 – via Newspapers.com.
- Miller, Joseph H. (February 18, 1954). "Council Unit OKs 6-Point Plan to 'Wreck' Charter". The Philadelphia Inquirer. p. 1 – via Newspapers.com.
- "3 Stay in GOP Race For Mayor, Phillips Quits Council Fight". The Philadelphia Inquirer. September 8, 1951. pp. 1, 9 – via Newspapers.com.
- "Dallas Loses by 457, Party's Lone Casualty". The Philadelphia Inquirer. November 9, 1955. p. 1 – via Newspapers.com.
- "PRR Ownership of Chinese Wall Site Questioned". The Philadelphia Inquirer. February 6, 1953. p. 31 – via Newspapers.com.
- "William Phillips Dies, ex-City Councilman". The Philadelphia Inquirer. June 10, 1962. p. 11 – via Newspapers.com.
- "Woman Elected to First Seat in City Council". The Philadelphia Inquirer. November 7, 1951. p. 2 – via Newspapers.com.
