= Harry Norwitch =

American politician

Harry Norwitch (born Hershel Arnowitch, June 18, 1894 – April 16, 1973) was an organized labor leader and Democratic politician from Philadelphia.

Norwitch was born in Odessa, Russia (present-day Ukraine) in 1894 and emigrated to the United States with his family as a child. Initially settling in Baltimore, Norwitch went to work at a clothing factory from the age of 13. He married Mae Schreiber in about 1917; they had two children, Mildred and Bernard. Norwitch became affiliated with the Amalgamated Clothing Workers union and moved to Philadelphia in 1926 to work as a business agent for the Joint Board Cutters and Trimmers Local 110. His union work brought him into local politics, and he became active in the Nonpartisan League, a socialist group, in 1934. He joined the Democratic Party and served as a delegate to the 1948 Democratic National Convention in Philadelphia, where President Harry S. Truman was nominated for a new term.

In 1949, Norwitch ran for a seat on Philadelphia's City Council in a special election that followed the death of L. Wallace Egan. Every seat on the Council was, at that time, held by Republicans, but Norwitch emerged the victor in his West Philadelphia district, defeating Republican James H. McHale, Progressive Lillian R. Narins, and independent Democrat Michael J. O'Connor. He and Maxwell E. Seidman, elected the same day, made up the council's entire Democratic caucus.

In 1951, Norwitch was reelected to Philadelphia City Council from West Philadelphia's 3rd district, part of a Democratic wave that swept the Republicans from power for the first time in 67 years. In 1954, he successfully opposed the efforts of fellow Democrats James Tate and Michael J. Towey to weaken the civil service reforms of the new charter. The following year, he was reelected with a slightly reduced majority.

In 1956, charter amendments aimed at weakening civil service protections were proposed again. Norwitch remained opposed, but the amendments found the required two-thirds vote in Council to make it on to the ballot for popular approval. The referendum failed in a vote that April. That same year, Norwitch sponsored a bill to extend the city's rent control policy. The bill passed, but was struck down by the Supreme Court of Pennsylvania that December. In 1959, Norwitch ran for a fourth Council term and defeated Republican Abraham Levin with 63.7% of the vote, his greatest margin to date.

As chairman of City Council's appropriations committee, Norwitch was involved with decisions about taxation and spending. In the early 1960s, he joined with Council President Tate to oppose the tax hikes called for by Mayor Richardson Dilworth, while continuing to advocate the city worker wage increases the new taxes were intended to fund. Ultimately, Council and the mayor agreed to a budget that was the largest in the city's history, including a wage tax hike from 1.5% to 1.625%. Norwitch defended the deal, noting that city workers' salaries lagged behind the rest of the nation, and that the tax increase was evenly spread between wage and property taxes. Norwitch also voted for increased funding for police and schools. In 1963, Norwitch ran for a fifth term. He had no primary election opposition and easily defeated Republican Mary Jane Ladner, getting 59% of the vote.

That same year, Norwitch testified before a grand jury investigating campaign contributions to him by a laundry business while a bill regulating such businesses was before the Council. Norwitch claimed there was no connection between the two, and was never charged. After Tate was elected mayor, Norwitch continued to support him, and clashed with fellow Democrat and City Council President Paul D'Ortona over taxation issues. In a change from his position of a few years earlier, Norwitch held the line on spending, voting to stop proposed pay increases for some city workers.

In his attempt at re-election in 1967, Norwitch did not receive the endorsement of the Democratic City Committee, which remained neutral in his race against his primary opponents. He accused party chairman Francis R. Smith of pitting blacks against whites and seeking a "racial fight when all Philadelphians should be working hand-in-hand to solve the problems of our big city." Norwitch blamed Smith for redistricting changes that made his 3rd district predominantly black, which had not been the case before. After calling the Democratic machine "self-serving" and calling Smith's tactics "despicable," Norwitch quit the race; the Democratic City Committee then endorsed local attorney and ward leader Charles L. Durham, who went on to win the primary and general elections. After his retirement, Tate appointed Norwitch deputy managing director of the city. Norwitch died of heart failure at Albert Einstein Medical Center in 1973, and was buried in Mount Lebanon Cemetery in Delaware County.

== Sources ==
- "City Vote Cast For Candidates". The Philadelphia Inquirer. November 5, 1959. p. 4 – via Newspapers.com.
- "Clash Disrupts Tax Hearing By Council Group". The Philadelphia Inquirer. February 6, 1964. p. 33 – via Newspapers.com.
- "Dallas Loses by 457, Party's Lone Casualty". The Philadelphia Inquirer. November 9, 1955. p. 1 – via Newspapers.com.
- "Democrats Take 2 Council Seats". The Philadelphia Inquirer. November 9, 1949. pp. 1, 3 – via Newspapers.com.
- "Harry Norwitch Dies at 76, Ex-Councilman, Labor Leader". The Philadelphia Inquirer. April 17, 1973. p. 35 – via Newspapers.com.
- "Indexes to Naturalization Petitions to the U.S. Circuit and District Court for the Eastern District of Pennsylvania, 1795-1951". Ancestry.com. National Archives and Records Administration. December 14, 1938.
- "Lawyer Quizzed in Zone Case, Gittens Quitting Tied to Probe". The Philadelphia Inquirer. June 6, 1963. p. 35 – via Newspapers.com.
- "No Pay Hikes Now for 18,000, City Tells Employees". Philadelphia Daily News. June 3, 1965. p. 5 – via Newspapers.com.
- "Norwitch Calls Demo Slash in School Funds Mistake". Philadelphia Daily News. November 21, 1963. p. 58 – via Newspapers.com.
- "Phila. Election at a Glance". The Philadelphia Inquirer. November 7, 1963. p. 5 – via Newspapers.com.
- "Record 1961 Budget, Realty, Wage Tax Rise Approved By Council". The Philadelphia Inquirer. December 1, 1960. pp. 1, 6 – via Newspapers.com.
- "Rent Control Extension Approved". The Philadelphia Inquirer. January 27, 1956. p. 7 – via Newspapers.com.
- "State High Court Outlaws City's Rent Control Ordinance". The Philadelphia Inquirer. December 11, 1956. p. 27 – via Newspapers.com.
- "Tate Raps Pay-Tax Link To Raise". The Philadelphia Inquirer. September 6, 1960. p. 37 – via Newspapers.com.
- "Woman Elected to First Seat in City Council". The Philadelphia Inquirer. November 7, 1951. p. 2 – via Newspapers.com.
- Kiseda, George (September 28, 1962). "Council Backs Plea in Budget For Cops". Philadelphia Daily News. p. 5 – via Newspapers.com.
- Lordan, Francis M. (March 14, 1967). "Norwitch Quits Race, Raps Smith Tactics". The Philadelphia Inquirer. p. 4 – via Newspapers.com.
- Miller, Joseph H. (February 18, 1954). "Council Unit OKs 6-Point Plan to 'Wreck' Charter". The Philadelphia Inquirer. p. 1 – via Newspapers.com.
- Schraga, Saul (February 24, 1956a). "Council Puts Ripper Up In Primary". The Philadelphia Inquirer. pp. 1, 11 – via Newspapers.com.
- Schraga, Saul (April 25, 1956b). "Voters Beat Proposal To Rip Up Charter". The Philadelphia Inquirer. pp. 1, 4 – via Newspapers.com.
