= Cornelius S. Deegan =

American politician and businessman

Cornelius Sylvester Deegan, Jr. (April 7, 1901 – August 29, 1967) was a Republican politician and businessman from Philadelphia.

Deegan was born in 1901, the son of Cornelius Sylvester Deegan, Sr. and Ella McCann Deegan. Deegan's father was a captain in the Philadelphia Fire Department. Deegan grew up in Northeast Philadelphia and graduated from Philadelphia Business College and Temple University Law School. He entered the insurance and real estate business after graduation and became involved with local politics.

In 1943, he was elected to Philadelphia City Council from the 8th district, and was re-elected in 1947. In 1951, after the new city charter came into effect, Deegan ran for county sheriff but was defeated by Democrat William M. Lennox. After the election, he served as the Republican ward leader for the 25th ward, but left that position when he was appointed to the Board of Revision of Taxes in 1956. He died in 1967 at Northeast Philadelphia's Nazareth Hospital and was buried at Holy Sepulchre Cemetery.

== See also ==
- List of members of Philadelphia City Council from 1920 to 1952

== Sources ==
- "Cornelius Deegan, Jr., Dies". The Philadelphia Inquirer. August 29, 1967. p. 25 – via Newspapers.com.
