= Thomas I. Guerin =

American politician

Thomas Ignatius Guerin (June 28, 1903 – October 12, 1956) was a Democratic lawyer and politician from Philadelphia.

Guerin was born in 1903 in Philadelphia, the son of John J. Guerin, a Republican state representative, and his wife, Jennie O'Connor Guerin. Guerin grew up in South Philadelphia and attended parochial schools. He graduated from Roman Catholic High School. He attended Temple University in pursuit of a bachelor of laws degree, attending at night while working in a law office. In 1923, Guerin was admitted to the bar even before finishing the degree. Because he was not yet 21 years old, his admission required a special exception; he finished the LL.B. degree the following year. After being admitted to the bar, Guerin opened a law practice with a classmate, John S. McEvoy. He later worked as a state deputy attorney general and as counsel to the state liquor control board. In 1928, he married Mary C. Henry.

Like his father, Guerin became involved in local politics, but in the opposing party; he often said he was the first Democrat in his family. He was an unsuccessful candidate for Philadelphia district attorney in 1939. He served in the United States Navy in World War II. In 1951, he was elected to Philadelphia City Council from South Philadelphia's 1st district, part of a Democratic wave that swept the Republicans from power for the first time in 67 years. In Council, he chaired the Public Property and Works Committee.

In 1954, Guerin joined the efforts James Tate and Michael J. Towey to weaken the civil service reforms of the new charter, but they were unsuccessful. He was re-elected in 1955 with an increased majority. The following year, he became ill with cancer. After an operation at Philadelphia's Hahnemann University Hospital, he died in his home at the age of 53. Guerin's widow ran as an independent for his former seat on City Council in 1957, but lost to Democrat Emanuel Weinberg.

Two years after Guerin's passing, the Guerin Recreation Center, located at 2201 S. 16th St., was constructed and dedicated to his memory. Today, it attracts hundreds of visitors daily and is renowned as a premier recreation center in South Philadelphia, celebrated for its role as both an athletic facility and a vibrant creative hub.

== Sources ==
- "Councilman Dies in Philadelphia". Shamokin News-Dispatch. Shamokin, Pennsylvania. October 12, 1956. p. 2.
- "Dallas Loses by 457, Party's Lone Casualty". The Philadelphia Inquirer. November 9, 1955. p. 1.
- Feist, William F. (January 11, 1952). "Setup of Committees Revamped By Council". The Philadelphia Inquirer. p. 50 – via Newspapers.com.
- "Thomas Guerin, of Council, Dies". The Philadelphia Inquirer. October 13, 1956. p. 17.
- "Woman Elected to First Seat in City Council". The Philadelphia Inquirer. November 7, 1951. p. 1.
- Miller, Joseph H. (February 18, 1954). "Council Unit OKs 6-Point Plan to 'Wreck' Charter". The Philadelphia Inquirer. p. 1 – via Newspapers.com.
- Miller, Joseph H. (November 6, 1957). "Democrats Take Every Office in City". The Philadelphia Inquirer. p. 1 – via Newspapers.com.
