= Paul D'Ortona =

American politician

Paul D'Ortona in 1967

Paul D'Ortona (December 29, 1903 – October 17, 1992) was a Democratic politician from Philadelphia who served as President of Philadelphia's City Council.

== Early life and career ==
D'Ortona was born in Guastameroli, Abruzzo, Italy, in 1903, the son of Giovanni and Maria D'Ortona. The family emigrated to the United States in 1913 and settled in South Philadelphia, where D'Ortona's father worked as a blacksmith. After leaving school at age 14, D'Ortona worked in a tailor's shop. He served in the United States Army from 1920 to 1923. In 1924, he married Anna Marie Trudel. After a brief career as a professional boxer—he fought one match in the flyweight division, a draw—he found more permanent work in the shoe manufacturing business.

He worked in state government during the Great Depression, working as a state hearing inspector from 1935 to 1939. After that, he worked briefly as a clerk in the city treasurer's office before being elected to the Pennsylvania House of Representatives as a Democrat in 1940, defeating Anne Brancato in the primary. Narrowly defeated for re-election in 1942, he left politics for a time, working in the stockroom of Snellenburg's department store.

== City Council ==
D'Ortona moved back into city politics as a protégé of Democratic City Committee Chairman James A. Finnegan, and was elected magistrate in 1949. In 1951, after Philadelphia adopted a new city charter, he ran for an at-large seat on the reformed city council. He placed fifth among the Democrats in that race, but that was sufficient to win one of the maximum five at-large seats that any one party's nominees could win. In Council, he chaired the Public Safety Committee. In that capacity, D'Ortona sponsored a law banning the sale of switchblade knives in the city.

The Democrats had come to power in the city because of their backing of a new city charter that reduced waste and mandated civil service reform. By 1954, however, D'Ortona joined the efforts James Tate and Michael J. Towey to weaken the civil service reforms (they were unsuccessful). He was re-elected in 1955, placing second among all candidates for at-large seats.

In 1956, charter amendments aimed at weakening civil service protections were proposed again. D'Ortona again sided with the organization Democrats seeking the change, and the amendments found the required two-thirds vote in Council to make it on to the ballot for popular approval. The referendum failed in a vote that April. He was elected to a third term in 1959, this time winning more votes than any at-large candidate.

== Council President ==
When Mayor Richardson Dilworth resigned as mayor to pursue a run for governor, Council President Tate became acting mayor; to fill his position, D'Ortona was elected Council President. He pledged an effort to control the cost of city government, which had been rising for several years previous. After the assassination of President Kennedy in 1963, D'Ortona ordered a study of firearms laws in the city, with the aim of increasing gun control. That year, he was elected to a fourth term on city council, again leading all councilmen in votes.

Tate was elected to a full term as mayor that same year, and he and D'Ortona would feud for the next four years. They differed over city-county consolidation measures, which had been lingering since the 1951 charter change. He also sparred with school district officials over their continuing requests for funding increases. When the city began to redevelop former swampland in Eastwick into new homes in 1966, D'Ortona moved there with his family. In 1967, he was elected to a fifth term, again leading all candidates for council.

== Retirement ==
D'Ortona's feud with Tate continued into the 1970s. While announcing that he would not seek a sixth term in council in 1971, he also told reporters that he opposed the mayoral candidacy of Tate's chosen successor, Police Commissioner Frank Rizzo. He pledged instead to support the best candidate for the job, "even if that man is a Republican." D'Ortona considered an independent bid for mayor, himself, but ultimately decided against it, citing a lack of financing and his age—67 years old.

After retiring from City Council in 1972, he moved back to South Philadelphia, served as chairman of the state lottery commission, and spent time at his summer home in Avalon, New Jersey. Despite rumors of a comeback in 1975, he remained out of city politics. D'Ortona died at JFK Hospital in Turnersville, New Jersey, in 1992, and was buried at Fernwood Mausoleum in Lansdowne, Pennsylvania.

== Sources ==
- "Naturalization Petitions for the Eastern District of Pennsylvania, 1795-1930". Ancestry.com. National Archives and Records Administration. May 16, 1917.
- Lush, Gerson R. (November 4, 1942). "Legislature Seems Assured for G.O.P." The Philadelphia Inquirer. pp. 1, 24 – via Newspapers.com.
- "Democrats Issue Slate of Primary Candidates". The Philadelphia Inquirer. May 19, 1951. p. 1 – via Newspapers.com.
- "Woman Elected to First Seat in City Council". The Philadelphia Inquirer. November 7, 1951. p. 1 – via Newspapers.com.
- Feist, William F. (January 11, 1952). "Setup of Committees Revamped By Council". The Philadelphia Inquirer. p. 50 – via Newspapers.com.
- Miller, Joseph H. (February 18, 1954). "Council Unit OKs 6-Point Plan to 'Wreck' Charter". The Philadelphia Inquirer. p. 1 – via Newspapers.com.
- "Dallas Loses by 457, Party's Lone Casualty". The Philadelphia Inquirer. November 9, 1955. p. 1 – via Newspapers.com.
- Schraga, Saul (February 24, 1956a). "Council Puts Ripper Up In Primary". The Philadelphia Inquirer. pp. 1, 11 – via Newspapers.com.
- Schraga, Saul (April 25, 1956b). "Voters Beat Proposal To Rip Up Charter". The Philadelphia Inquirer. pp. 1, 4 – via Newspapers.com.
- Bulletin Almanac 1960. Philadelphia, Pennsylvania: The Philadelphia Bulletin. 1960. OCLC 8641470.
- "D'Ortona Named Council Chief; Launches Economy Drive". The Philadelphia Inquirer. February 9, 1962. p. 5 – via Newspapers.com.
- "Safety Crusader". The Philadelphia Inquirer. February 9, 1962. p. 5 – via Newspapers.com.
- "Phila. Election at a Glance". The Philadelphia Inquirer. November 7, 1963. p. 5 – via Newspapers.com.
- "Firearms Law Study Ordered by D'Ortona". The Philadelphia Inquirer. November 28, 1963. p. 4 – via Newspapers.com.
- "Compromise Attempts with Tate on Merger Failed, D'Ortona Says". The Philadelphia Inquirer. March 1, 1964. p. 4 – via Newspapers.com.
- Janssen, Peter A.; Carroll, Robert F. (November 14, 1964). "Whittier, LaBrum Clash With D'Ortona at Stormy Hearing on School Budget". The Philadelphia Inquirer. pp. 1, 8 – via Newspapers.com.
- DeWolf, Rose (January 24, 1966). "D'Ortona 'Pioneers' in Eastwick Swampland". The Philadelphia Inquirer. p. 21 – via Newspapers.com.
- Lordan, Francis M. (November 8, 1967). "Democrats Keep 13-4 Council Edge; 2 Races May Go To Court". The Philadelphia Inquirer. p. 5 – via Newspapers.com.
- Harris, Gene (February 25, 1971). "D'Ortona Won't Run Again, Will Fight Rizzo-Tate". The Philadelphia Inquirer. pp. 1, 8 – via Newspapers.com.
- Heymsfeld, Jeremy (August 5, 1971). "D'Ortona Won't Run, Cites Age, Loyalty, Finances". The Philadelphia Inquirer. p. 23 – via Newspapers.com.
- "D'Ortona 'Just Taking It Easy'". The Philadelphia Inquirer. February 4, 1973. p. 17 – via Newspapers.com.
- Fleishman, Jeffrey (October 18, 1992). "Democrat P. D'Ortona Dead at 88". The Philadelphia Inquirer. pp. A1, A16 – via Newspapers.com.
- "Paul D'Ortona". Historical Biographies. Pennsylvania House of Representatives. 2017.
