= Alice F. Liveright =

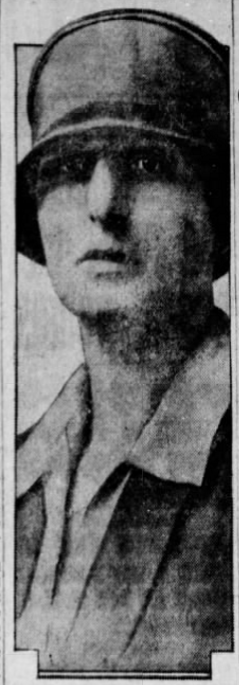
Alice F. Liveright in 1929

Alice Springer Fleisher Liveright (December 18, 1882 - February 18, 1958) was a Philadelphia social worker who served as State Secretary of Welfare in the 1930s.

== Biography ==
Alice Springer Fleisher was born in Philadelphia on December 18, 1882, to a prominent German Jewish family, the daughter of Alexander Fleisher and Martha Springer Fleisher. She attended a finishing school, and after graduation enrolled at the Drexel Institute of the University of Pennsylvania (now called Drexel University). In 1906, she married I. Albert Liveright, who was in the clothing business. They had one child, a son named Alexander. They were members of Keneseth Israel temple, one of the oldest reform synagogues in the United States.

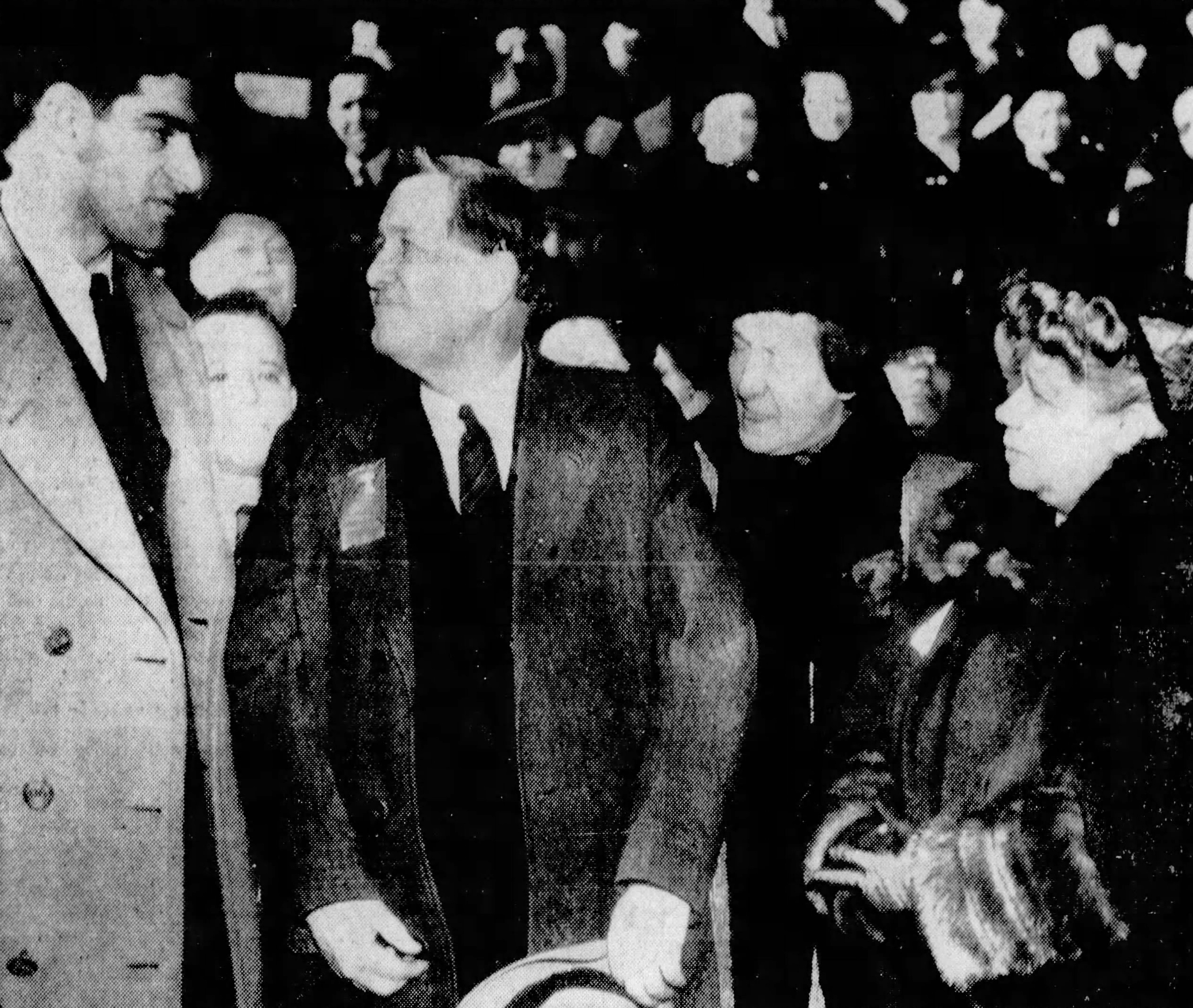
Liveright (second from right) with former senator Smith W. Brookhart and former Abraham Lincoln Brigade commander Milton Wolff at an event on the steps of the U.S. Capitol Building calling to lift the embargo on Spain, January 9, 1939

Liveright studied at the Pennsylvania School of Social Work from 1912 to 1918 and began a career in social work, especially involving charitable Jewish groups. She served as president of the Juvenile Aid Society, a Jewish organization for troubled youth. Initially a socialist, she later served on the Woman's Executive Committee of the Pennsylvania Republican State Committee. In 1931, her charitable and political work drew the attention of Pennsylvania governor Gifford Pinchot, who appointed her state welfare secretary in 1931. Liveright served in that position until 1935. Following that, she worked on the advisory staff of the federal Works Progress Administration until 1936, in the process moving from the Republican Party to President Franklin D. Roosevelt's Democratic Party.

Her devotion to left-wing solutions to the problem of poverty led Liveright to switch parties again when she became a Progressive to support Henry A. Wallace's third-party bid for the White House in 1948. As a Progressive, she ran for a seat on Philadelphia City Council in 1951, but finished far back of the winners with under one percent of the vote. She died in Philadelphia in 1958 at the age of 75.
