= Anti-Pearlman Permanent Poster League =

APPPLE makes the cover of city-wide Philadelphia Daily News - Sep 28, 1979

The Anti-Permanent Pearlman Poster League of the East (APPPLE) was an early (1979-1984) example of grass-roots political satire performed to generate media coverage. It employed tactics now known as culture jamming and guerilla communication.

== History ==
The group was founded to protest Al Pearlman, a Philadelphia councilman in the 1970s and 1980s. Pearlman had a habit of campaigning through masonite signs, 2x4 feet, nailed to telephone poles fifteen feet off the ground; though required by law, these were not removed after elections, and some stayed up for several elections and were simply modified from one election to the next. The group argued, in a 1979 call to The Philadelphia Inquirer that explained the first poster, that Pearlman should pay rent for the signs.

The Pearlman posters featured pictures of Pearlman, which the Anti-Pearlman Permanent Poster League would decorate with creative new designs in the broad daylight wearing white coveralls with a large apple on the back. They would often call Philadelphia Inquirer columnist Clark DeLeon prior to the redesign jobs who would month after month reveal their latest exploits to his readers with stories and pictures. Most of the posters were removed by Pearlman's people within days of the changes.

== Known posters ==
Name	First Public Display
Mouse Ears	Sept. 18, 1979
Clown	Oct. 8, 1979
Gangster	Nov. 28, 1979
Nose Thumbing	Dec.12, 1979
Mouse Ears (ayatollah)	Dec. 14, 1979
Santa	NA
Apple on Head	Feb. 1, 1980
Bubblehead	Feb. 21, 1980
Puppet	May 19, 1982
Joker	Jun. 5, 1983
Litter Basket	Sept. 18, 1983
