= Maxwell E. Seidman =

American politician

Maxwell Edward Seidman (April 18, 1898 – November 17, 1950) was an American lawyer and politician affiliated with the Democratic Party.

== Early life and education ==
Seidman was born in Philadelphia in 1898, the son of Russian-Jewish immigrants Isaac and Jennie Seidman. By the time of Seidman's birth, his father was working as a real estate agent. He attended South Philadelphia High School and the Wharton School of the University of Pennsylvania. After Wharton, Seidman stayed at Penn for law school, graduating in the 1920s and starting his own practice.

== Career ==
Initially a Republican, Seidman joined the Democratic Party in 1933 as a part of John B. Kelly, Sr.'s "independent Democratic" faction. When Democrat George Howard Earle III was elected governor in 1934, he appointed Seidman as a special deputy attorney general, working with the state banking department and the state board of motion picture censors.

Seidman became the Democratic leader of the 1st ward and, in 1949, was nominated for Philadelphia City Council in a special election to fill a vacancy created by the death of Republican councilman Frank X. O'Connor. Seidman won, narrowly defeating his Republican opponent, Roman Catholic High School football coach Joseph A. Graham, Jr. He joined Harry Norwitch as one of only two Democrats in the 22-member council.

== Personal life ==
Seidman's tenure on City Council was brief. While visiting New York City on November 17, 1950, he suffered a heart attack and died at the age of 53. He was buried in Mount Sharon Cemetery in Springfield, Delaware County, Pennsylvania.

== Sources ==
- "1910 United States Federal Census, T624_1385, page 16A". Ancestry.com.
- "Democrats Name 2 For Council". The Philadelphia Inquirer. October 5, 1949. p. 2 – via Newspapers.com.
- "Democrats Take 2 Council Seats". The Philadelphia Inquirer. November 9, 1949. pp. 1, 3 – via Newspapers.com.
- "M.E. Seidman, Councilman, Dies". The Philadelphia Inquirer. November 19, 1950. pp. 1, 15 – via Newspapers.com.
