= William M. Lennox =

American politician

William M. Lennox

William Mercer Lennox (August 8, 1900 – October 7, 1991) was a Democratic politician from Philadelphia who served as sheriff from 1952 to 1972.

== Formative years and family ==
Born in Philadelphia on August 8, 1900, William M. Lennox was a son of Robert Lennox and his wife, Theresa Howarth Lennox. At the age of seventeen, he enlisted in the United States Navy and served in the First World War.

After the war, he worked as the business manager of athletics at the University of Pennsylvania. In 1928, Lennox married Kathryn Kilgallen, with whom he had five children, Nancy, William, Jane, Mary Ellen and Benedict.

== Career ==
In 1950, Democratic ward leaders nominated Lennox for the Philadelphia City Council during a special election that followed the death of Charles E. O'Halloran. He won and served the remained of the term, which ended in 1952. In 1951, instead of running for another term on the council, Lennox ran for sheriff and won. He was reelected in 1955, 1959, 1963, and 1967.

After his fifth term, Lennox retired from office at the age of seventy-one, but remained active in the community, working as a volunteer at St. John's Hospice in Center City.

== Death ==
Lennox died on October 7, 1991.

== See also ==
- List of members of Philadelphia City Council from 1920 to 1952
- 1980 interview with Lennox

== Sources ==
- "Pennsylvania, WWI Veterans Service and Compensation Files, 1917-1919, 1934-1948". Ancestry.com. Pennsylvania Historical and Museum Commission. March 19, 1934.
- "Lennox Will Run For Council Post". The Philadelphia Inquirer. October 3, 1950. p. 10 – via Newspapers.com.
- Roche, Walter F. (October 8, 1991). "William M. Lennox, 91, sheriff from 1952-72, later hospice volunteer". The Philadelphia Inquirer. p. 7-B – via Newspapers.com.
