= Joseph A. Scanlon =

American politician (1901–1957)

Member of the Pennsylvania House of Representatives from the Philadelphia County district
- In office 1935–1952

Personal details
- Born: 1901
- Died: April 1957 (aged 55–56)
- Party: Democratic
- Occupation: Clerk, politician

Joseph A. Scanlon (1901 – April 1957) was a Democratic member of the Pennsylvania House of Representatives, serving from 1935 to 1952. In 1951, he was elected clerk of courts in Philadelphia.
