= Charles M. Finley =

American politician

Finley in 1937

Charles Michael Finley (February 25, 1899 – August 25, 1958) was a Democratic businessman and politician from Philadelphia.

Finley was born in Philadelphia in 1899 to Michael Finley and Katherine Reilly Finley. Michael Finley was active in Democratic politics in the city, and his son followed him in that role. Finley started his working life as a chauffeur before attending La Salle College. After graduation, he became involved in textile manufacturing. Finley took his first political job at a State Revenue Department, and later worked for the Internal Revenue Service as chief of the Social Security division. He became director of the State Liquid Fuels Tax Bureau, where he was in charge of administering gasoline taxes. While working in state government, he became the Democratic leader for Philadelphia's 50th ward (covering his neighborhood of West Oak Lane) at a time when Republicans dominated the city's politics.

In 1951, Philadelphia adopted a new city charter; that same year, Democrats swept to victory in mayoral and city council races, breaking the Republicans' 67-year-long control of city government. Finley was among those elected, winning a city council seat from the ninth district with 63% of the vote. The Democratic party was led by a reform faction that attracted the votes of many Republicans disappointed in political corruption under their party's leadership. He served as chairman of the Council's committee on Municipal Development and Zoning. In 1954, Finley backed the reform faction of the party, led by mayor Joseph S. Clark, Jr., when several ward leaders led by Democratic City Chairman William J. Green, Jr., unsuccessfully sought to amend the city charter to remove civil service reforms. Finley was reelected as councilman from the ninth district in 1955 with 61% of the vote. He died of a heart attack in 1958 while vacationing in Margate, New Jersey. He is buried in Whitemarsh Memorial Park in Ambler, Pennsylvania.

== Sources ==
- "Clark's Men Pull Through". The Plain Speaker. Hazleton, Pennsylvania. March 19, 1954. p. 21.
- "Councilman Finley Dies". The Philadelphia Inquirer. August 26, 1958. p. 10.
- "Dallas Loses by 457, Party's Lone Casualty". The Philadelphia Inquirer. November 9, 1955. p. 1.
- "Gasoline Station Operators Warned". Warren Times-Mirror. Warren, Pennsylvania. July 31, 1937. p. 1.
- "Personalities at the Capital". Harrisburg Telegraph. Harrisburg, Pennsylvania. August 19, 1937. p. 9.
- "Woman Elected to First Seat in City Council". The Philadelphia Inquirer. November 7, 1951. p. 1.
