= John F. Byrne Sr. =

American politician

Pennsylvania Senate, District 8
- In office 1951–1952
- Preceded by: Louis H. Farrell
- Succeeded by: Francis P. McCusker

Philadelphia City Council

Personal details
- Born: February 21, 1911 Philadelphia, Pennsylvania
- Died: August 6, 1965 (aged 54)
- Party: Democratic
- Education: La Salle College

John F. Byrne Sr. (February 21, 1911 – August 6, 1965) was an American politician from Philadelphia, Pennsylvania who served as a Democratic member of the Pennsylvania Senate for the 8th district from 1951 to 1952.

== Early life and education ==
Byrne was born in Philadelphia. He attended St. Joseph's Preparatory School and received a business degree from La Salle College.

== Career ==
He worked as a real estate and insurance broker, and was a business partner and friend of William J. Green Jr., a Philadelphia congressman and Democratic party leader. In 1950, Byrne was elected to the Pennsylvania Senate for the 8th district and served from 1951 to 1952. The following year, he ran for a seat on the Philadelphia City Council against incumbent Clarence K. Crossan. Byrne won the election, representing Northeast Philadelphia's 10th district, as the Democrats took control of the city government for the first time in 67 years.

He was re-elected to city council in 1955, this time winning one of five at-large seats. The following year, Byrne resigned his seat when Governor George M. Leader appointed him to a seat on the Pennsylvania Turnpike Commission. In 1963, he and fellow Councilman Victor E. Moore were indicted for perjury during a grand jury investigation of city government, but were both acquitted. His term on the Turnpike Commission expired in June 1965; he was still serving until a successor was appointed when he died of a heart attack that August.

His son, John F. Byrne Jr., later served in the state senate.

== Legacy ==
The John F. Byrne golf course in Northeast Philadelphia was renamed in honor of Byrne.

== Sources ==
- "Woman Elected to First Seat in City Council". The Philadelphia Inquirer. November 7, 1951.
- "Dallas Loses by 457, Party's Lone Casualty". The Philadelphia Inquirer. November 9, 1955.
- "John F. Byrne Dies; Democrat Leader, 54". The Philadelphia Inquirer. August 7, 1965 – via Newspapers.com.
- "John Byrne Dies at 54". The Morning Herald. Uniontown, Pennsylvania. August 7, 1965 – via Newspapers.com.
- "Heart Attack Fatal to John Byrne, Pike Commissioner". The Daily Courier. Connellsville, Pennsylvania. August 7, 1965 – via Newspapers.com.
