= Joseph J. Hersch =

American politician (1903–1968)

Joseph J. Hersch

Joseph John Hersch (December 19, 1903 – October 17, 1968) was a Democratic politician from Philadelphia who served in the Pennsylvania House of Representatives and as a city magistrate before being elected to the Philadelphia City Council.

== Early life and education ==
Joseph J. Hersch was born in Philadelphia in 1903, the son of Charles H. Hersch and Mary Fitzpatrick Hersch. His parents were involved in city politics, both serving as the Democratic ward leader for the city's 37th ward. Hersch attended parochial schools through eighth grade and then became a union upholster. His father served as city coroner, then an elected position, from 1933 to 1941.

In 1939, Hersch was involved in a strange incident in the Philadelphia Sheriff's office when Republican Sheriff William J. Hamilton Jr. was confirmed as state Secretary of Revenue, deputy coroner Vincent Moranz claimed the office for himself and appointed Hersch as his deputy. According to a story in The Philadelphia Inquirer the next day, "none of the participants in the man-made mixup took the affair very seriously, except Hamilton" who called it "calculated trickery."

== Career ==
=== State legislator and city magistrate ===
In 1940, Hersch was elected to the Pennsylvania House of Representatives along with fellow Democrat James R. Rooney to represent the 20th district (state house districts were multi-member at the time). He went on to serve five nonconsecutive terms thereafter, being re-elected in 1942, 1944, 1948, 1950, and 1952. After the 1952 election, Hersch was the unanimous choice of the House Democratic caucus for the position of minority whip. By that time, Philadelphia had approved a new city charter and Hersch worked with a bipartisan coalition in Harrisburg to reverse some of the reform-minded changes it made. The effort was unsuccessful, but ward leaders rewarded Hersch by nominating him to an open seat for magistrate in Philadelphia in 1953. (City magistrates presided over a local court, the duties of which are now performed by the Philadelphia Municipal Court.) He was elected, and resigned his House seat that year to take up his new post.

Two years later, in 1955, Hersch was appointed chief of the magistrates. In 1958, he earned the praise of Mayor Richardson Dilworth for his efforts to clean up the corruption surrounding traffic tickets in the city, an effort Dilworth believed contributed to the decline in unsafe driving. In 1961, Hersch asked City Council for an increase in funding of the magistrate courts, which he said were overworked because so many more traffic tickets were being written. In an interview later that year, Hersch explained that his lack of formal education beyond eighth grade was no hindrance to his performance of the job of magistrate. "A law degree doesn't make a magistrate more qualified. Living with people is more essential than going to a law library to find out what it's all about. ... If you take Purdon's law books away from [the lawyers], they're out of business."

Not everyone shared Dilworth's high opinion of Hersch. In 1962, the Committee of Seventy, a non-partisan watchdog group, called for Hersch's removal from the job, citing an excessive discharge rate that let too many defendants avoid fines for traffic infractions. Hersch's fellow magistrates in both parties rallied to his defense, and he kept his job for the time being. The next year, though, a change of party power in Harrisburg meant that the new Republican governor, William Scranton, would have the power to replace him. Instead, Hersch resigned to run for an open seat on the Philadelphia City Council.

=== Philadelphia city councilman ===
Hersch ran unopposed for city council in the 1963 primary and was elected easily at the general election that November. The seat had previously been held by James Tate, who was elected mayor that year. In 1966, Hersch also succeeded Tate as vice-chairman of the City Democratic Committee after Tate declined to run for the party post. By 1967, Hersch and Tate had become serious rivals in inter-party fights. Hersch was nevertheless reelected in 1967, as was the mayor.

The following year, Hersch died suddenly at the age of 64 at Lankenau Medical Center. He was buried in Northwood Cemetery after a funeral Mass at St. Veronica Catholic Church in North Philadelphia.

== Personal life ==
In 1938, Hersch married the former Mary Nolan, who worked as a telephone operator. They were listed as husband and wife in the 1940 census, but after that Mary is never mentioned in connection with Hersch again, even in his obituary, and they appear to have had no children.

Hersch's first marriage appears to have ended soon after it began, but after his death, a second woman, Nell Yesalonis, claimed to have married Hersch in January 1956. Yesalonis claimed she and Hersch kept the marriage a secret because Hersch's mother (who died in 1966) disapproved and "was very jealous." Yesalonis claimed a pension as Hersch's widow, and was awarded one by the city Board of Pensions and Retirement in May 1969.

== Sources ==
Book

- Abraham, Henry J. (1998). The Judicial Process: An Introductory Analysis of the Courts of the United States, England, and France (7th ed.). New York: Oxford University Press. pp. 153–154. ISBN 978-0195099874.

Newspapers

- Kendrick, Alexander (February 8, 1939). "Hamilton Recaptures Sheriff's Office After Moranz 'Grabs' Job". The Philadelphia Inquirer. pp. 1, 5 – via Newspapers.com.
- "City Vote for State House". The Philadelphia Inquirer. November 6, 1951. p. 17 – via Newspapers.com.
- "C.H. Hersch, Dies, Former Coroner". The Philadelphia Inquirer. July 10, 1951. p. 12 – via Newspapers.com.
- "House Democrats Re-Name Andrews Minority Leader". Shamokin News-Dispatch. December 10, 1952. p. 1 – via Newspapers.com.
- Miller, Joseph H. (April 9, 1953a). "Phila. House Bloc Pushes Plan to Scuttle Charter". The Philadelphia Inquirer. pp. 1, 6 – via Newspapers.com.
- Miller, Joseph H. (May 20, 1953b). "Organization Tickets Win Sluggish Primary; Loan Proposals Beaten". The Philadelphia Inquirer. pp. 1, 8 – via Newspapers.com.
- "GOP Captured 7 Seats in Race For Magistrates". The Philadelphia Inquirer. November 4, 1953. p. 2 – via Newspapers.com.
- "Scofflaw School, War on City Jaywalkers Urged". The Philadelphia Inquirer. August 21, 1958. p. 5 – via Newspapers.com.
- "Hersch Blames 'Pressures' for Boom in Tickets". The Philadelphia Inquirer. November 14, 1961. p. 39 – via Newspapers.com.
- "'70' urges Governor to Remove Hersch". The Philadelphia Inquirer. May 6, 1962. p. B-1 – via Newspapers.com.
- "27 Magistrates Assail '70' on Hersch Charges". The Philadelphia Inquirer. May 12, 1962. p. 13 – via Newspapers.com.
- "Daly Replaces Hersch as Chief Magistrate". The Philadelphia Inquirer. February 9, 1963. p. 12 – via Newspapers.com.
- Goulden, Joseph C. (November 6, 1963). "2 Democrats Ousted, GOP Gains One Council Seat". The Philadelphia Inquirer. p. 5 – via Newspapers.com.
- Miller, Joseph H. (June 14, 1966). "Smith is Re-Elected City Democratic Chief, Tate Declines 3rd Spot". The Philadelphia Inquirer. p. 6 – via Newspapers.com.
- "Hersch Asks Democratic Harmony". The Philadelphia Inquirer. September 6, 1967. p. 8 – via Newspapers.com.
- "Joseph Hersch Dies; City Councilman, 64". The Philadelphia Inquirer. October 18, 1968. p. 42 – via Newspapers.com.
- Eady, James (March 12, 1969). "Divorcee Says She's Widow of Joseph Hersch". The Philadelphia Inquirer. p. 51 – via Newspapers.com.
- "Hersch's Secret Wife Awarded His Pension". The Philadelphia Inquirer. May 16, 1969. p. 24 – via Newspapers.com.

Websites

- "Joseph J. Hersch". Historical Biographies. Pennsylvania House of Representatives. 2019.
- "Virginia, Marriage Records, 1936–2014". Ancestry.com.
- "1940 United States Federal Census, T627, page 13A". Ancestry.com.
