= Clarence K. Crossan =

American politician

Clarence Kennedy Crossan (April 16, 1876 – September 25, 1960) was a Philadelphia Republican politician who served for 28 years on the Philadelphia City Council.

Crossan was born in Philadelphia's Fox Chase neighborhood in 1876, the son of Kennedy Crossan and Martha Ann Maxton. His father founded Crossan Construction Company, a firm that specialized in railroad work, and Crossan and his brother, Arthur Brook Crossan, Sr., followed their father into the business. He graduated from the Peirce School of Business in 1889 at the age of thirteen, then attended the University of Pennsylvania, graduating with an electrical engineering degree in 1898. He married Emma Jeanne Heacock the following year.

He and his brother ran Crossan Construction from 1913 to 1932 when his brother died. Crossan was also involved in many community organizations around Northeast Philadelphia. He entered politics as a Republican in 1923, winning a seat on the 22-member Philadelphia City Council, one of several members representing the multi-member 8th district. He was reelected every four years until 1951.

On the Council, Crossan became known as an independent-minded Republican, as did his protege, Austin Meehan. In 1947, he sponsored legislation to create a group charged with revising the city charter. The result of that study was the Philadelphia Home Rule Charter, which voters approved in a 1951 referendum and which remains in force today. The charter remodeled city council, eliminating multi-member districts. Crossan ran for the new 10th district seat, but lost to Democrat John F. Byrne Sr., and retired from politics. He remained involved in the real estate business until his death in 1960 at the age of 85.

== See also ==
List of members of Philadelphia City Council from 1920 to 1952

== Sources ==
- "C.K. Crossan, Ex-Councilman, Dies at 85". The Philadelphia Inquirer. September 26, 1960. p. 8 – via Newspapers.com.
- "Philadelphia, Pennsylvania, Marriage Index, 1885–1951". Ancestry.com.
