= 2015 Philadelphia municipal election =

2015 Pennsylvania local election

2015 Philadelphia elections
- November 3, 2015

A general election was held in Philadelphia, Pennsylvania on November 3, 2015, to elect various county and city-level positions. The primary election was held May 19, 2015.

== Mayor ==
=== Results ===
2015 Philadelphia mayoral election
Party	Candidate	Votes	%
Democratic	Jim Kenney	203,730	85.36
Republican	Melissa Murray Bailey	31,563	13.22
Independent	James Foster	1,713	0.72
Socialist Workers	Osborne Hart	1,234	0.52
Independent	Boris Kindij	321	0.13
Write-in		103	0.04
Total votes		238,664	100.00
Democratic hold			

== City Commissioners ==
=== Democratic primary ===
==== Results ====
Democratic primary results (vote for up to 2)
Party	Candidate	Votes	%
Democratic	Anthony Clark (incumbent)	75,769	30.85
Democratic	Lisa M. Deeley	47,636	19.39
Democratic	Carol A. Jenkins	38,138	15.53
Democratic	Tracey L. Gordon	32,140	13.08
Democratic	Omar Sabir	31,236	12.72
Democratic	Will Mega	20,629	8.40
Write-in		83	0.03
Total votes		245,631	100.00

=== Republican primary ===
==== Results ====
Republican primary results (vote for up to 2)
Party	Candidate	Votes	%
Republican	Al Schmidt (incumbent)	12,444	99.78
Write-in		28	0.22
Total votes		12,472	100.00

=== General election ===
==== Results ====
2015 Philadelphia City Commissioners election (vote for up to 2)
Party	Candidate	Votes	%
Democratic	Anthony Clark (incumbent)	155,379	44.70
Democratic	Lisa M. Deeley	154,112	44.33
Republican	Al Schmidt (incumbent)	37,912	10.91
Write-in		228	0.07
Total votes		347,631	100.00

== Register of Wills ==
2015 Philadelphia register of wills election
- November 3, 2015

Candidate	Ronald Donatucci	Ross Feinberg
Party	Democratic	Republican
Popular vote	166,945	32,984
Percentage	83.48%	16.49%
- Donatucci: 50–60% 60–70% 70–80% 80–90% >90% Feinberg: 50–60% 60–70% Tie: 50%
Register of Wills before election
Ronald Donatucci
Democratic
Elected Register of Wills
Ronald Donatucci
Democratic

Incumbent 36-year Ronald Donatucci ran unopposed in the Democratic primary and was reelected in a landslide, winning a 10th term.

=== Democratic primary ===
==== Nominee ====
- Ronald Donatucci, incumbent Register of Wills (1980–present)

==== Results ====
Democratic primary results
Party	Candidate	Votes	%
Democratic	Ronald Donatucci (incumbent)	134,882	99.89
Write-in		142	0.11
Total votes		135,024	100.00

=== Republican primary ===
==== Nominee ====
- Ross Feinberg, former stockbroker and U.S. Navy veteran

==== Results ====
Republican primary results
Party	Candidate	Votes	%
Republican	Ross Feinberg	11,662	99.91
Write-in		11	0.09
Total votes		11,673	100.00

=== General election ===
==== Results ====
2015 Philadelphia Register of Wills election
Party	Candidate	Votes	%
Democratic	Ronald Donatucci (incumbent)	166,945	83.48
Republican	Ross Feinberg	32,984	16.49
Write-in		46	0.02
Total votes		199,975	100.00
Democratic hold			

== Sheriff ==
2015 Philadelphia sheriff election
- November 3, 2015

Candidate	Jewell Williams	Christopher Sawyer
Party	Democratic	Republican
Popular vote	158,044	41,705
Percentage	79.10%	20.87%
- Williams: 50–60% 60–70% 70–80% 80–90% >90% Sawyer: 50–60% 60–70% 70–80% Tie: 50%
Sheriff before election
Jewell Williams
Democratic
Elected Sheriff
Jewell Williams
Democratic

Incumbent Sheriff Jewell Williams ran unopposed in the Democratic primary and was reelected in a landslide, winning a second term.

=== Democratic primary ===
==== Nominee ====
- Jewell Williams, incumbent Sheriff (2012–present)

==== Results ====
Democratic primary results
Party	Candidate	Votes	%
Democratic	Jewell Williams (incumbent)	135,530	99.73
Write-in		364	0.27
Total votes		135,894	100.00

=== Republican primary ===
==== Nominee ====
- Christopher Sawyer, systems engineer and anti-blight activist

==== Results ====
Republican primary results
Party	Candidate	Votes	%
Republican	Christopher Sawyer	11,675	99.90
Write-in		12	0.10
Total votes		11,687	100.00

=== General election ===
==== Results ====
2015 Philadelphia Sheriff election
Party	Candidate	Votes	%
Democratic	Jewell Williams (incumbent)	158,044	79.10
Republican	Christopher Sawyer	41,705	20.87
Write-in		55	0.03
Total votes		199,804	100.00
Democratic hold			

== Court of Common Pleas partisan election ==
=== Democratic primary ===
==== Results ====
Democratic primary results (vote for up to 12)
Party	Candidate	Votes	%
Democratic	Ken Powell	54,320	4.77
Democratic	Kai Scott	52,646	4.63
Democratic	Tracy B. Roman	51,643	4.54
Democratic	Abbe Fletman	47,298	4.16
Democratic	Mia Roberts Perez	43,388	3.81
Democratic	Lyris Younge	41,242	3.62
Democratic	Rainy Papademetriou	40,324	3.54
Democratic	Scott DiClaudio	40,163	3.53
Democratic	Daine Grey Jr.	38,690	3.40
Democratic	Chris Mallios	35,005	3.08
Democratic	Michael Fanning	33,726	2.96
Democratic	Stephanie M. Sawyer	33,690	2.96
Democratic	Jennifer Schultz	33,402	2.94
Democratic	Leon Goodman	32,275	2.84
Democratic	Vincent N. Melchiorre	30,100	2.64
Democratic	Frances Fattah	29,565	2.60
Democratic	Brian T. Ortelere	28,879	2.54
Democratic	Stella Tsai	27,527	2.42
Democratic	Deborah Watson Stokes	27,100	2.38
Democratic	Thomas Martin	26,938	2.37
Democratic	Jon Marshall	25,180	2.21
Democratic	Lynne M. Summers	24,351	2.14
Democratic	Betsy Wahl	24,120	2.12
Democratic	James F. Berardinelli	23,247	2.04
Democratic	Anthony Kyriakakis	22,084	1.94
Democratic	Lucretia Clemons	21,013	1.85
Democratic	Vincent Furlong (Note: Cross-filed for the Republican nomination.)	20,471	1.80
Democratic	Leon A. King II	20,134	1.77
Democratic	Marissa Brumbach	20,088	1.77
Democratic	Edward William Louden Jr.	19,918	1.75
Democratic	Wayne M. D. Bennett	18,025	1.58
Democratic	Chris McCabe	16,908	1.49
Democratic	Jodi Lobel	16,814	1.48
Democratic	Vince Giusini	16,799	1.48
Democratic	Shanese Johnson	15,670	1.38
Democratic	Rania Major	14,014	1.23
Democratic	Joshua Hill	13,695	1.20
Democratic	Sherman Toppin	12,835	1.13
Democratic	Sandjai Weaver	12,176	1.07
Democratic	William J. Ciancaglini	10,028	0.88
Democratic	Franklin A. Bennett III	7,789	0.68
Democratic	Tangie M. Boston	7,654	0.67
Democratic	Starr Marshall Cash	7,059	0.62
Write-in		64	0.01
Total votes		1,138,057	100.00

=== Republican primary ===
==== Results ====
Republican primary results (vote for up to 12)
Party	Candidate	Votes	%
Republican	Vincent Furlong (Note: Cross-filed for the Democratic nomination.)	12,042	99.05
Write-in		115	0.95
Total votes		12,157	100.00

=== General election ===
==== Results ====
2015 Philadelphia Court of Common Pleas election (vote for up to 12)
Party	Candidate	Votes	%
Democratic	Ken Powell	154,011	9.39
Democratic	Mia Roberts Perez	148,798	9.07
Democratic	Kai Scott	146,494	8.93
Democratic	Tracy B. Roman	144,294	8.80
Democratic	Abbe Fletman	143,026	8.72
Democratic	Lyris Younge	136,170	8.30
Democratic	Stephanie M. Sawyer	127,707	7.79
Democratic	Michael Fanning	122,638	7.48
Democratic	Chris Mallios	122,556	7.47
Democratic	Daine Grey Jr.	121,869	7.43
Democratic	Rainy Papademetriou	120,446	7.34
Democratic	Scott DiClaudio	115,197	7.02
Republican	Vincent Furlong	36,953	2.25
Write-in		233	0.01
Total votes		1,640,392	100.00

== Court of Common Pleas retention elections ==
=== Results ===
Justice Gwendolyn N. Bright retention, 2015
Choice	Votes	%
For	77,824	80.30
Against	19,097	19.70
Total	96,921	100.00
Source: Philadelphia City Commissioners

Justice Glenn B. Bronson retention, 2015
Choice	Votes	%
For	68,320	76.82
Against	20,615	23.18
Total	88,935	100.00
Source: Philadelphia City Commissioners

Justice Ann M. Butchart retention, 2015
Choice	Votes	%
For	70,257	78.45
Against	19,299	21.55
Total	89,556	100.00
Source: Philadelphia City Commissioners

Justice Matthew D. Carrafiello retention, 2015
Choice	Votes	%
For	69,077	77.28
Against	20,304	22.72
Total	89,381	100.00
Source: Philadelphia City Commissioners

Justice Amanda Cooperman retention, 2015
Choice	Votes	%
For	72,407	79.55
Against	18,614	20.45
Total	91,021	100.00
Source: Philadelphia City Commissioners

Justice Charles J. Cunningham retention, 2015
Choice	Votes	%
For	68,346	77.70
Against	19,611	22.30
Total	87,957	100.00
Source: Philadelphia City Commissioners

Justice Idee C. Fox retention, 2015
Choice	Votes	%
For	66,642	75.64
Against	21,462	24.36
Total	88,104	100.00
Source: Philadelphia City Commissioners

Justice Lisette Shirdan Harris retention, 2015
Choice	Votes	%
For	66,628	77.01
Against	19,887	22.99
Total	86,515	100.00
Source: Philadelphia City Commissioners

Justice Marlene F. Lachman retention, 2015
Choice	Votes	%
For	68,045	77.76
Against	19,464	22.24
Total	87,509	100.00
Source: Philadelphia City Commissioners

Justice Patricia McInerney retention, 2015
Choice	Votes	%
For	73,513	80.51
Against	17,801	19.49
Total	91,314	100.00
Source: Philadelphia City Commissioners

Justice Walter J. Olszewski retention, 2015
Choice	Votes	%
For	65,576	75.91
Against	20,815	24.09
Total	86,391	100.00
Source: Philadelphia City Commissioners

Justice Frank Palumbo retention, 2015
Choice	Votes	%
For	64,811	72.13
Against	25,039	27.87
Total	89,850	100.00
Source: Philadelphia City Commissioners

Justice Lillian Harris Ransom retention, 2015
Choice	Votes	%
For	68,073	77.97
Against	19,230	22.03
Total	87,303	100.00
Source: Philadelphia City Commissioners

Justice Susan I. Schulman retention, 2015
Choice	Votes	%
For	69,955	78.50
Against	19,154	21.50
Total	89,109	100.00
Source: Philadelphia City Commissioners

Justice Leon W. Tucker retention, 2015
Choice	Votes	%
For	67,502	76.93
Against	20,242	23.07
Total	87,744	100.00
Source: Philadelphia City Commissioners

Justice John Milton Younge retention, 2015
Choice	Votes	%
For	65,309	75.56
Against	21,126	24.44
Total	86,435	100.00
Source: Philadelphia City Commissioners

== Philadelphia Municipal Court partisan election ==
=== Democratic primary ===
==== Results ====
Democratic primary results (vote for up to 3)
Party	Candidate	Votes	%
Democratic	Sharon Williams Losier	70,667	21.85
Democratic	Christine Hope	64,228	19.86
Democratic	Joffie C. Pittman	56,208	17.38
Democratic	Christian DiCicco	38,826	12.00
Democratic	Matthew Perks	37,110	11.47
Democratic	Daniel R. Sulman	24,228	7.49
Democratic	Gary S. Silver	19,283	5.96
Democratic	Franklin A. Bennett III	12,835	3.97
Write-in		48	0.01
Total votes		323,433	100.00

=== Republican primary ===
==== Results ====
Republican primary results (vote for up to 3)
Party	Candidate	Votes	%
Republican	Christine Hope	11,910	99.73
Write-in		32	0.27
Total votes		11,942	100.00

=== General election ===
==== Results ====
2015 Philadelphia Municipal Court election (vote for up to 3)
Party	Candidate	Votes	%
Democratic	Christine Hope	148,240	31.60
Republican	Christine Hope	27,204	5.80
Total	Christine Hope	175,444	37.40
Democratic	Sharon Williams Losier	147,625	31.47
Democratic	Joffie C. Pittman	145,997	31.12
Write-in		105	0.02
Total votes		469,171	100.00

== Philadelphia Municipal Court retention elections ==
=== Results ===
Justice Frank T. Brady retention, 2015
Choice	Votes	%
For	72,821	79.07
Against	19,275	20.93
Total	92,096	100.00
Source: Philadelphia City Commissioners

Justice Pat Dugan retention, 2015
Choice	Votes	%
For	68,116	77.84
Against	19,388	22.16
Total	87,504	100.00
Source: Philadelphia City Commissioners

Justice Barbara S. Gilbert retention, 2015
Choice	Votes	%
For	68,295	78.30
Against	18,928	21.70
Total	87,223	100.00
Source: Philadelphia City Commissioners

Justice Charles Hayden retention, 2015
Choice	Votes	%
For	66,139	76.96
Against	19,805	23.04
Total	85,944	100.00
Source: Philadelphia City Commissioners

Justice Gerard A. Kosinski retention, 2015
Choice	Votes	%
For	67,138	76.69
Against	20,412	23.31
Total	87,550	100.00
Source: Philadelphia City Commissioners

Justice Marsha H. Neifield retention, 2015
Choice	Votes	%
For	67,372	77.67
Against	19,364	22.33
Total	86,736	100.00
Source: Philadelphia City Commissioners

Justice Dawn A. Segal retention, 2015
Choice	Votes	%
For	64,411	72.93
Against	23,906	27.07
Total	88,317	100.00
Source: Philadelphia City Commissioners

Justice Craig M. Washington retention, 2015
Choice	Votes	%
For	67,424	76.04
Against	21,248	23.96
Total	88,672	100.00
Source: Philadelphia City Commissioners

== Ballot questions ==
Four ballot questions appeared on the primary ballot and three questions appeared on the general ballot. All proposals passed.

=== Primary election ===
Proposal 1 results by ward Yes: 50%–60%; 60%–70%; 70%–80%; 80%–90%

Proposed Charter Change 1: Call Upon the Pennsylvania State Government to Abolish the School Reform Commission
Choice	Votes	%
For	122,325	74.98
Against	40,823	25.02
Total	163,148	100.00
Source: Philadelphia City Commissioners

Proposal 2 results by ward Yes: 50%–60%; 60%–70%; 70%–80%; 80%–90%

Proposed Charter Change 2: Create the Commission for Women
Choice	Votes	%
For	123,027	76.32
Against	38,173	23.68
Total	161,200	100.00
Source: Philadelphia City Commissioners

Proposal 3 results by ward Yes: 50%–60%; 60%–70%; 70%–80%; 80%–90%; No: 50%–60%

Proposed Charter Change 3: Require City agencies to develop access plans for people with limited English proficiency
Choice	Votes	%
For	111,429	70.53
Against	46,569	29.47
Total	157,998	100.00
Source: Philadelphia City Commissioners

Proposal 4 results by ward Yes: 50%–60%; 60%–70%; 70%–80%; 80%–90%; 90%–100%

Proposed Charter Change 4: Create the Commission on Universal Pre-Kindergarten
Choice	Votes	%
For	126,683	78.77
Against	34,139	21.23
Total	160,822	100.00
Source: Philadelphia City Commissioners

=== General election ===
Proposal 1 results by ward Yes: 50%–60%; 60%–70%; 70%–80%; No: 50%–60%; 60%–70%

Proposed Charter Change 1: Create the Office of Lesbian, Gay, Bisexual and Transgender (LGBT) Affairs
Choice	Votes	%
For	93,731	57.71
Against	68,680	42.29
Total	162,411	100.00
Source: Philadelphia City Commissioners

Proposal 2 results by ward Yes: 50%–60%; 60%–70%; 70%–80%; 80%–90%; No: 50%–60%

Proposed Charter Change 2: Create the Department of Planning and Development and Housing Advisory Board
Choice	Votes	%
For	101,310	68.02
Against	47,625	31.98
Total	148,935	100.00
Source: Philadelphia City Commissioners

Bond proposal results by ward Yes: 50%–60%; 60%–70%; 70%–80%; 80%–90%; No: 50%–60%

Authorize $155.965 million in bonds for capital projects
Choice	Votes	%
For	116,828	69.71
Against	50,775	30.29
Total	167,603	100.00
Source: Philadelphia City Commissioners
