= Al Pearlman =

Member of Philadelphia City Council (died 1984)

Al Pearlman (died 1984) was a Democratic member of Philadelphia City Council. He served two non-consecutive terms. Pearlman was also a contractor and built Frank Rizzo's house in Philadelphia.

First elected in 1976, Pearlman resigned his term (1976–1982) to unsuccessfully run for state senate. He was elected to a second term beginning in 1984. Dying of cancer, Pearlman took his own life in 1984.

Pearlman inspired the grassroots political group Anti-Pearlman Permanent Poster League, or APPPLE.

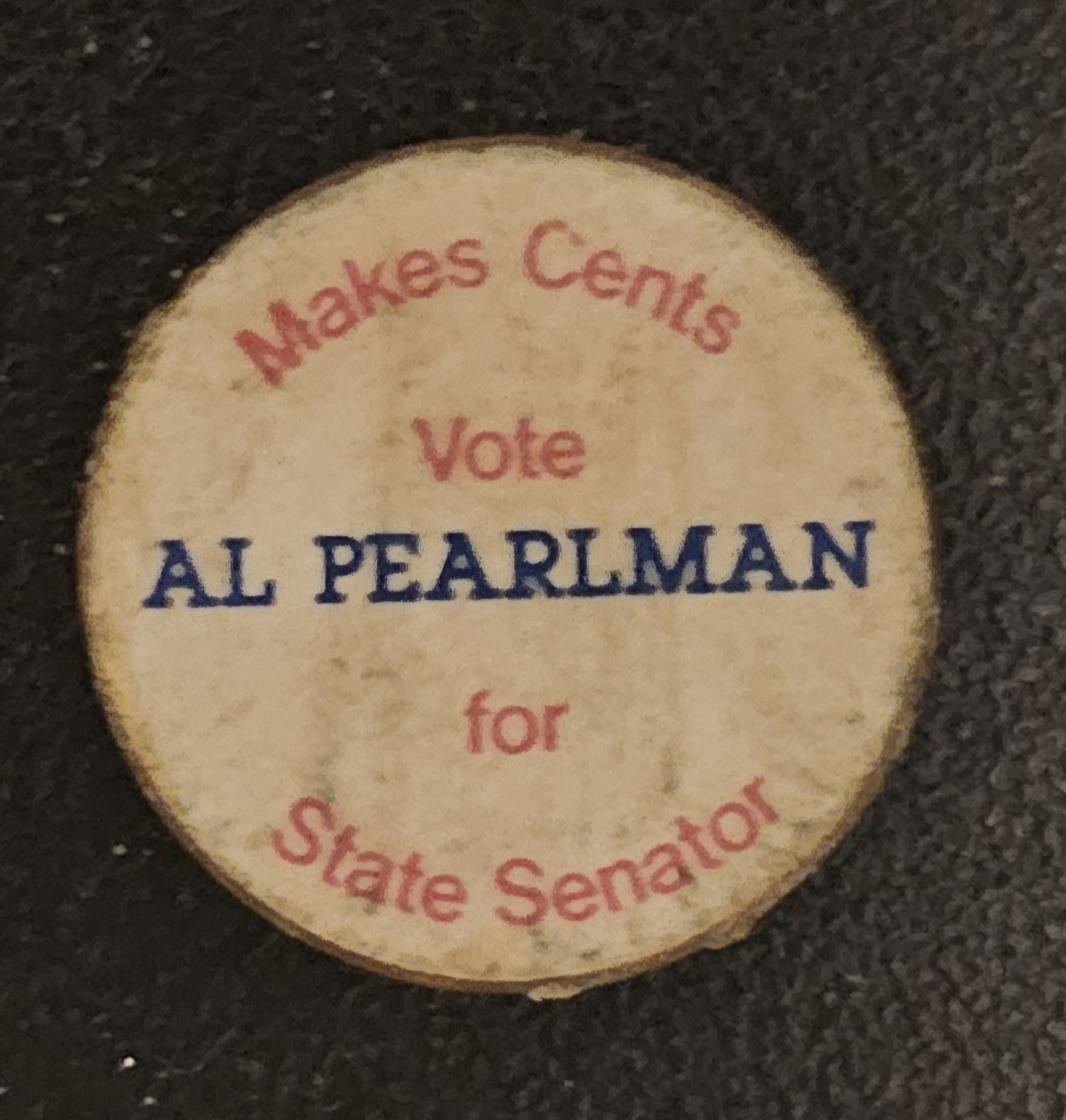
Political campaign sticker placed on the back of a 1972 US Penny.
