= 2014 Philadelphia City Council special election =

- May 20, 2014 (1 At-Large)
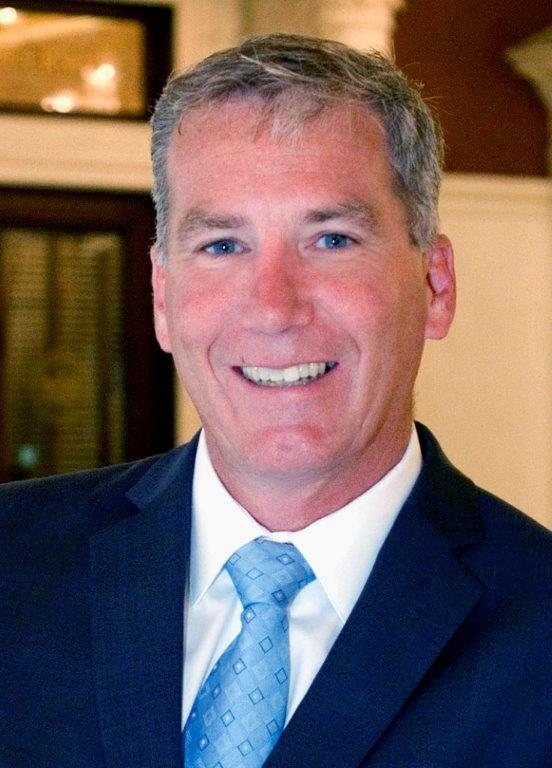
| Nominee | Ed Neilson | Matt Wolfe | Nikki Allen Poe |
| Party | Democratic | Republican | Libertarian |
| Popular vote | 66,204 | 13,018 | 4,403 |
| Percentage | 78.65% | 15.47% | 5.23% |
| Seats up | 1 | 0 | 0 |
| Seats won | 1 | 0 | 0 |
Council President before election
Darrell L. Clarke
Democratic
Elected Council President
Darrell L. Clarke
Democratic

The 2014 Philadelphia City Council special election took place on May 20, 2014, alongside the primary election. The composition of the Philadelphia City Council remained unchanged from before the election, with Democrats maintaining their 14–3 majority on the council.

== Background ==
City Council Member Bill Green resigned due to being nominated by Governor Tom Corbett to become the chair of the School Reform Commission.

In March 2014, Democratic ward leaders nominated former political director of International Brotherhood of Electrical Workers Local 98 chapter Ed Neilson while Republicans nominated lawyer Matt Wolfe and Libertarians nominated comedian and marijuana legalization activist Richard Tamaccio Jr., who later appeared on the ballot under his stage name Nikki Allen Poe.

== Results ==
Philadelphia City Council Member At-Large District 1, 2014 special election
| Party | Candidate | Votes | % |
|---|---|---|---|
| Democratic | Ed Neilson | 66,204 | 78.65 |
| Republican | Matt Wolfe | 13,018 | 15.47 |
| Libertarian | Nikki Allen Poe | 4,403 | 5.23 |
| Write-in | | 551 | 0.65 |
| Total votes | | 84,176 | 100 |
| Democratic hold | | | |
