= Lewis M. Stevens =

American politician

Lewis Miller Stevens (July 11, 1898 - July 15, 1963) was a lawyer and politician from Philadelphia.

Stevens was born in Meriden, Connecticut, in 1898, the son of Frank A. Stevens and Harriet M. Beech. After serving briefly in the United States Army in 1918, he graduated from Princeton University in 1920. Stevens earned a J.D. from Harvard Law School in 1923, after which he moved to Philadelphia and was admitted to the Pennsylvania bar. He worked for the firm of Henry, Pepper, Bodine and Stokes (now Pepper Hamilton LLP) before becoming a founding member of Stradley, Ronon, Stevens and Young in 1926. He remained a partner in the firm for the rest of his life. He married Elizabeth Morgan in 1929; they had four children.

Stevens was involved in politics in Philadelphia, initially as a Republican. He soon grew dissatisfied with the Republican machine that then dominated the city's politics. In 1939, Stevens ran for district attorney on a ticket backed by Democrats and independent Republicans, but was unsuccessful, losing to regular Republican Charles F. Kelley by 30,000 votes. He continued to be active in the city's reform movement and the Republican Party. In 1947, he was appointed chief counsel of the United States Senate's Banking and Currency Committee, which was then investigating the Reconstruction Finance Corporation, an independent agency of the federal government created during the Great Depression. The following year, he became the Layman Moderator of the Philadelphia branch of the government of the Presbyterian Church.

In 1949, Stevens helped organize the Greater Philadelphia Movement, which worked for reform of city government and adoption of a new city charter. That mission was fulfilled in 1951, when city voters adopted the new charter Stevens and the Movement had drafted. Later that year, Stevens ran for one of the at-large seats on the reformed city council. He ran as a Democrat and was elected, part of a wave election that swept the Republicans from power for the first time in 67 years. Stevens won the second-highest vote total of any of the seven at-large candidates elected. He served as the chairman of City Council's Finance Committee.

In 1955, he declined to run for reelection, and returned to his law practice and charitable organizations, which included memberships on the boards of the World Affairs Council of Philadelphia, the Presbyterian Hospital of Philadelphia, and Lincoln University, among others. In March 1963, Stevens suffered a stroke and underwent brain surgery. He lived for four more months, but ultimately succumbed to illness and died in Temple University Hospital on July 15, 1963. He is buried in the churchyard of Saint Thomas Episcopal Church in Whitemarsh, Pennsylvania.

== Sources ==
- "Ex-Councilman Lewis Stevens Dies". Philadelphia Inquirer. July 16, 1963. p. 20 – via Newspapers.com.
- "Lewis M. Stevens, 1898-1963". The Annals of the American Academy of Political Science. 349: viii. September 1963. JSTOR 1035691.
- "Woman Elected to First Seat in City Council". Philadelphia Inquirer. November 7, 1951.
- "Death certificate". Ancestry.com.
