= Michael J. Towey =

American politician

Member of the Philadelphia City Council from the 6th district
- In office 1952 – September 29, 1960
- Succeeded by: William A. Dwyer Jr.

Personal details
- Born: Michael John Towey; June 17, 1902 County Mayo, Ireland
- Died: September 29, 1960 (aged 58) Philadelphia, Pennsylvania, U.S.
- Resting place: North Cedar Hill Cemetery
- Party: Democratic
- Spouse: Pearl Weidmayer
- Education: Drexel Institute of Technology (BE)

Michael John Towey (June 17, 1902 – September 29, 1960) was an American labor leader and Democratic politician from Philadelphia. He represented the 6th district on the Philadelphia City Council from 1952 until his death in 1960.

== Early life and education ==
Towey was born in 1902 in County Mayo, Ireland, the son of Joseph and Ann Towey. He emigrated to the United States at the age of 15 and graduated from Philadelphia's Northeast High School. He later attended the University of Pennsylvania before graduating with an engineering degree from Drexel Institute of Technology.

== Labor career ==
After graduating, Towey worked as a plumber and became the business representative of the United Association of Plumbers. He was later elected president of Plumbers Union Local 690.

== Political career ==
=== Early campaigns ===
Towey ran for the Democratic nomination in the 5th state Senate district in 1936. He finished a distant second to party organization candidate Israel Stiefel.

In 1947, Towey and Anthony Massing were nominated without opposition for Philadelphia City Council in the 5th district, which elected two council members at the time. Both lost in the general election to Republican nominees Louis Schwartz and Frederic Garman. Three years later, Towey defeated the party organization-backed incumbent to become Democratic leader of the 19th ward in West Kensington.

=== Philadelphia City Council ===
In the 1951 municipal election, Towey ran again for City Council from the River Wards' newly drawn 6th district and was elected with 55% of the vote. His election was part of a Democratic wave that combined with independent, pro-reform Republicans to end 67 years of Republican control of city government.

The Democrats had supported a new city charter that introduced measures to reduce waste and mandated civil service reform. By 1954, however, Towey had joined fellow Democrat James Tate in an effort to weaken the charter's civil service provisions. Their proposal fell short of the two-thirds vote in Council required to place the amendments on the ballot.

The following year, Towey was reelected with 56% of the vote. In 1956, Towey and Tate again proposed charter amendments aimed at weakening civil service protections. This time, the proposal received the required Council vote to be placed on the ballot. Voters rejected the amendments in an April referendum.

In the 1959 municipal election, Towey won a third Council term, defeating Republican Stanley Bednarek with 60.3% of the vote, his highest vote share in a Council election.

== Personal life and death ==
Towey was married to Pearl Weidmayer. On September 29, 1960, he suffered a heart attack at his home in Juniata Park and died at the age of 58. He was survived by his wife and was buried in North Cedar Hill Cemetery in Philadelphia.
