= James A. Finnegan =

American politician

Secretary of the Commonwealth of Pennsylvania
- In office December 29, 1956 – March 26, 1958
- Governor: George M. Leader
- Preceded by: Henry E. Harner
- Succeeded by: John S. Rice
- In office January 18, 1955 – November 17, 1955
- Governor: George M. Leader
- Preceded by: Gene D. Smith
- Succeeded by: Henry E. Harner

President of the Philadelphia City Council
- In office January 1, 1951 – January 14, 1955
- Succeeded by: James Tate

Member of the Philadelphia City Council
- In office January 6, 1947 – January 18, 1955

Personal details
- Born: James Aloysius Finnegan; December 20, 1906
- Died: March 26, 1958 (aged 51)
- Party: Democratic
- Education: University of Pennsylvania

James Aloysius Finnegan (December 20, 1906 – March 26, 1958) was a Democratic politician from Philadelphia, Pennsylvania. He was graduated from the University of Pennsylvania in 1931, and then served the United States Air Force as Lieutenant Colonel in the Troop Carrier Command in the United States, England, and France from 1942 to 1946.

Finnegan served in succession as Secretary of the Delaware River Navigation Commission under Governor George Howard Earle III, administrative assistant to Senator Francis J. Myers, administrative assistant to former Congressman Michael J. Bradley, and chair of the Philadelphia County Democratic Executive Committee. A member of Philadelphia City Council, he was elected its president in 1951, serving until January 1955.

Finnegan became Secretary of the Commonwealth under Governor George M. Leader in 1955. He resigned the position that same year to assume the duties of campaign manager for Illinois Governor Adlai Stevenson II's pre-convention and later presidential campaign in 1956. Leader reappointed Finnegan Secretary of the Commonwealth on December 28, 1956. He served in this capacity until his death, at age 52, on March 26, 1958.

Pennsylvania political leaders at the time of Finnegan's demise created the Finnegan Foundation. The foundation's purpose is to provide educational fellowships to undergraduates.
