= Merit system =

Hiring civil service employees based on ability

The merit system is the process of promoting and hiring government employees based on their ability to perform a job, rather than on their political connections. It is the opposite of the spoils system.

== History ==
The earliest known example of a merit system dates to the Qin and Han dynasties. To maintain power over a large, sprawling empire, the government maintained a complex network of officials. Prospective officials could come from a rural background and government positions were not restricted to the nobility. Rank was determined by merit, through the civil service examinations, and education became the key for social mobility. After the fall of the Han Dynasty, the nine-rank system was established during the Three Kingdoms period. The concept of a merit system spread from China to British India during the 17th century, and then into continental Europe.

=== United States ===
The United States civil service began to run on the spoils system in 1829 when Andrew Jackson became president. The assassination of United States President James A. Garfield by a disappointed office seeker in 1881 proved its dangers. President Garfield was shot by Charles J. Guiteau who believed that the president owed him a civil service position and in not giving him the position, threatened the very being of the Republican Party. In 1883, the system of appointments to the United States federal bureaucracy was revamped by the Pendleton Civil Service Reform Act, which made the merit system common practice. The merit system determines the fitness of the candidate by the ability to pass a written competitive examination, given by a commission of examiners. The answers submitted by candidates must be unsigned, so as to obviate the possibility of favoritism on the part of the examiners. A list is made of the successful candidates, arranged in the order of their merit as shown by the results of the examination. Appointments must be made from this eligible list in the order of rank unless good cause can be shown why one of higher rank should be set aside for one standing lower on the list.

Proponents of the system admit that the system does not always lead to the choice of most competent candidate but is effective in eliminating those most incompetent. In addition the possible exclusion of most competent candidate is outweighed by the system's benefits such as limiting the ability of nepotism and political favoritism. The power of appointment being vested in the president of the United States by the United States Constitution, it is not within the power of the United States Congress to fetter the president's action by the enactment of laws restricting the exercise of the power of appointments. Thus, in the United States, the merit system has been extensively applied by the voluntary action of the president following self-imposed rules. It has been judicially determined that the civil-service rules promulgated by the president of the United States do not have the force of general law and confer upon members of the civil service no right to invoke the aid of the courts to protect them against violation thereof. They are the president's laws, and the president alone can enforce them. Working under the supervision of the president is the Merit Systems Protection Board. The MSPB follows nine core principles when governing the executive branch workforce.

== Performance assessment ==
=== Forced ranking ===
Forced ranking is a system in which performing employees are ranked into groups a company has established. The term 'Rank and Yank' was created by the former CEO of General Electric, Jack Welch. The 'Rank and Yank' idea encouraged terminating the employment of poor performers and replacing them with new personnel. Many like Welch and former Chief Executive of Microsoft believe in replacing poor performers while others, such as Tom Barry, former Managing Director at BlessingWhite, believe in 're-engaging underperforming employees.'

=== Consequences of performance assessment ===
As the United States has become anti-bureaucratic, it has moved away from the outdated depiction of merit system. Twenty-eight states have established an 'at will' employment environment where civil service employees can be fired at any time without cause. In 2014 the Department of Veteran Affairs became overwhelmed with problems with scheduling appointments. Congress called for immediate action and ordered the Department of Veteran Affairs to lay off 'miscreant' employees. Donald F. Kettl explores in his work, The Merit Principle in Crisis, whether 'At will' practices and whether they're beneficial to the bureaucratic practices of the government. Kettl states that due to an increase in government programs, firing 'miscreant' bureaucratic employees would only 'weaken the government's ability to steer'.

== Pros ==
The importance of the merit system in a workplace is to provide good quality work to the public. When merit is truly assessed in the process of hiring or promoting personnel, an honest, effective, and productive workplace is created. Employees build organizations and the service they provide to customers allows the organization to be successful. Without its employees or customers, an organization would be doomed. Motivated and happy employees are the key principle of the merit system. Employees who are satisfied with their jobs are likely to provide a higher level of productivity (more work in less time, costing organizations less money), less likely to quit (low or lower employee turnover rates), great communication for voicing workplace concerns (trust and comfort between supervisor and employees), little to no abuse of company benefits/incentives, i.e.: lunch breaks, sick leave, bonuses, etc. Bottom line, administration is responsible for providing and setting the atmosphere and standards of a workplace that result in success.

== Cons ==
The merit system has been criticized that it leads to uncooperative behaviors among employees, creating conflict that can negatively affect productivity. It is based on performance compensation that encourages competition among employees, creating a competitive environment that puts employees at odds with one another. This can lead to unwanted behavior that can affect productivity. Disrupting team unity to look better on reviews and personal goals becomes more important than team goals.

== See also ==
- Meritocracy
- Personnel selection
- Merit pay
- Spoils system
- President James. A Garfield
- Pendleton Civil Service Reform Act
- Vitality curve
