= Louis Schwartz =

American politician

Louis Schwartz

Louis Schwartz (April 15, 1888 – July 18, 1966) was a Republican politician from Philadelphia who served in the Pennsylvania state legislature and the Philadelphia City Council.

Schwartz was born in 1888 in Galați, Romania. He emigrated with his parents and siblings to the United States in 1900, settling in Philadelphia. His father was a shoemaker, and Schwartz followed him into that business before taking classes to earn his real estate license. He started his own real estate business, which quickly became successful. He married Jennie Stern in 1911, with whom he had two children. Schwartz and his family were members of the Kneses Israel Anshe S'fard synagogue in Philadelphia.

In the 1920s, Republican ward leader David H. Lane mentored Schwartz in the world of the Philadelphia Republican Party, which was dominant in city politics at that time. Schwartz was elected in 1926 to the Pennsylvania House of Representatives and served there for four consecutive terms. While there he worked for reform of the state's Blue Laws, bringing Sunday baseball and movies to Pennsylvania for the first time. In 1928, he was also elected leader of the 20th ward, a position he held until 1957.

In 1935, he announced plans to run for Mayor of Philadelphia, but ultimately decided on a city council seat instead. He was elected along with Frederic D. Garman to represent the 5th district, which sent two members to the City Council under the 1919 city charter; Republicans won all 22 seats in the council that year. In 1939, he and Garman were re-elected easily. The pair were returned to office in 1943 and 1947 as their party continued to dominate city politics.

By 1951, that dominance was waning as a new city charter endorsed by Democrats and independent reformers took effect. Schwartz ran for one of the new at-large seats on the council and won the most votes of any of the candidates in the Republican primary that year. For the seven at-large seats, each party could nominate five candidates, and voters could only vote for five, with the result being that the majority party could only take five of the seven seats, leaving two for the minority party; although the Democrats took the top five slots, Schwartz led the five Republicans, entitling him to one of the two minority party positions. He was re-elected in 1955, again leading all Republicans in the at-large vote.

Schwartz stepped down as ward leader in 1957, part of a breach with party leadership over the selection of candidates for magistrate in the election that year. In 1959, now in his seventies, Schwartz announced that he would not seek re-election to a seventh city council term. He retired to Atlantic City, New Jersey, and died there in 1966.
