= James Tate (politician) =

American politician (1910–1983)

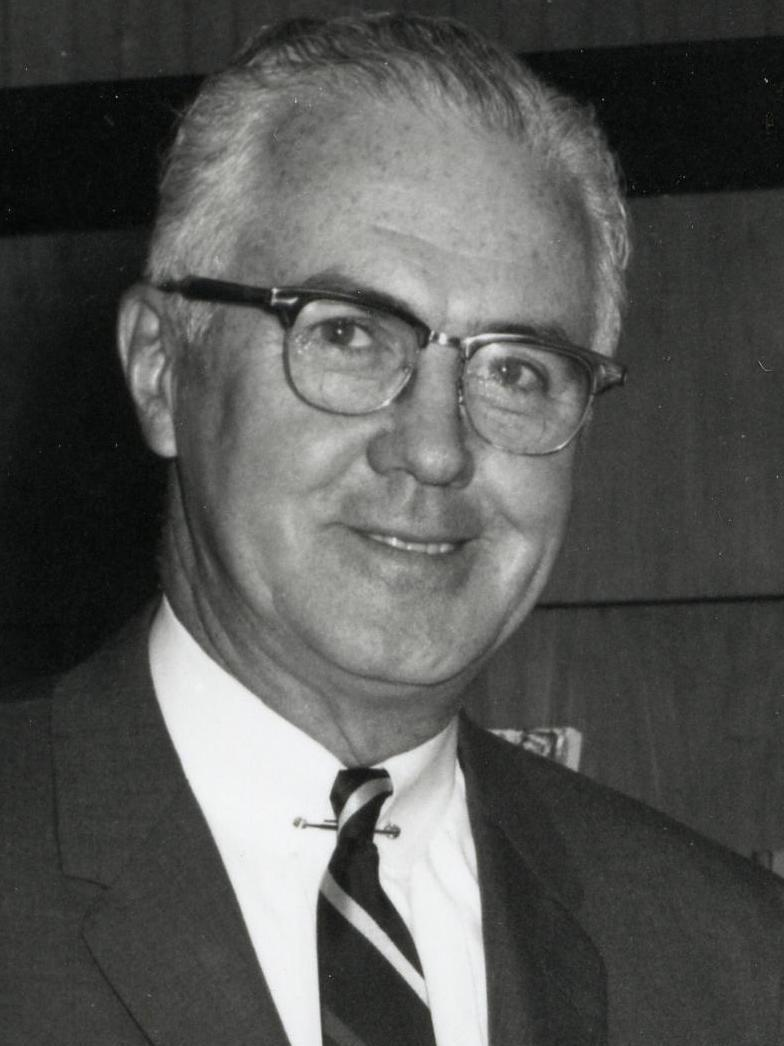

92nd Mayor of Philadelphia
- In office February 12, 1962 – January 3, 1972^{[a]}
- Preceded by: Richardson Dilworth
- Succeeded by: Frank Rizzo

28th President of the United States Conference of Mayors
- In office 1970–1971
- Preceded by: Jack D. Maltester
- Succeeded by: Henry Maier

41st President of the National League of Cities
- In office 1968
- Preceded by: Harold M. Tollefson
- Succeeded by: Beverly Briley

President of the Philadelphia City Council
- In office January 20, 1955 – January 6, 1964
- Preceded by: himself^{[b]}
- Succeeded by: Paul D'Ortona

President pro tempore of the Philadelphia City Council
- In office January 4, 1954 – January 20, 1955
- Preceded by: James A. Finnegan^{[c]}
- Succeeded by: himself

Member of the Philadelphia City Council from the 7th district
- In office January 7, 1952 – January 6, 1964
- Preceded by: John F. Byrne
- Succeeded by: Joseph J. Hersch

Member of the Pennsylvania House of Representatives from the Philadelphia County district
- In office January 7, 1941 – November 30, 1946

Personal details
- Born: April 10, 1910 Philadelphia, Pennsylvania, U.S.
- Died: May 27, 1983 (aged 73) Somers Point, New Jersey, U.S.
- Party: Democratic
- Education: Temple University (LLB)
- a.Acting Mayor from February 12, 1962, through January 6, 1964. b.As President of the City Council. c.As Council President.

James Hugh Joseph Tate (April 10, 1910 – May 27, 1983) was an American politician. A member of the Democratic Party, he served as the 92nd Mayor of Philadelphia from 1962 to 1972. He was also a member of the Pennsylvania House of Representatives and the Philadelphia City Council. He was the first Roman Catholic to serve as mayor of Philadelphia.

== Biography ==
=== Early life and career ===
He was born on April 10, 1910, in Philadelphia. He received his Bachelor of Laws from Temple University in 1938 and clerked for the Philadelphia Court of Common Pleas.

He was active in Democratic Party politics and, in 1941, won a seat in the Pennsylvania House of Representatives to an at-large seat for Philadelphia County. He won re-election to the House in 1943 and 1945. In 1951, he won a seat on the Philadelphia City Council and became the President pro tempore in 1954, which became the council president in 1955. He held that position for nearly 10 years.

=== Mayor of Philadelphia ===
Mayor Richardson Dilworth resigned his post in 1962 in order to make a second run for Governor in that fall's general election. As the city council president, Tate became acting mayor upon Dilworth's resignation. He went on to win two terms in his own right, in 1963 and 1967. As a result, he is to date the second longest serving mayor.

In 1963, he defeated Republican James McDermott with 54% of the vote. He fended off a protest by the Congress of Racial Equality by stopping construction of the Philadelphia Municipal Services Building until more black workers were hired.

In 1967, he appointed Frank Rizzo as the police commissioner. He defeated District Attorney Arlen Specter in 1967 by fewer than 12,000 votes.

In 1968, Tate served as president of the National League of Cities. From 1970 to 1971, he served as the president of the United States Conference of Mayors.

== Later life and death ==
Towards the end of his life, Tate lived in Longport, New Jersey.

Tate died of an apparent myocardial infarction in Somers Point, aged 73.

Political offices
Preceded by Richardson Dilworth	Mayor of Philadelphia^{1} 1962–1972	Succeeded by Frank Rizzo
Philadelphia City Council
Preceded by Himself as President pro tempore of the City Council	President of the Philadelphia City Council; 1955–1964	Succeeded by Paul D'Ortona
Preceded by James A. Finnegan	President pro tempore of the Philadelphia City Council; 1954–1955	Succeeded by Himself as Council President
Preceded by John F. Byrne	Member of the Philadelphia City Council for the 7th district 1952–1964	Succeeded by Joseph J. Hersch
Notes and references
1. Acting Mayor from 1962 through early 1964
