= 2011 Philadelphia municipal election =

2011 Pennsylvania local election

2011 Philadelphia elections
- November 8, 2011

A general election was held in Philadelphia, Pennsylvania on November 8, 2011, to elect various county and city-level positions. The primary election was held May 17, 2011.

== Mayor ==
=== Results ===
2011 Philadelphia mayoral election
Party	Candidate	Votes	%
Democratic	Michael Nutter (incumbent)	136,532	74.64
Republican	Karen Brown	39,597	21.65
Independent	Wali Rahman	6,580	3.60
Write-in		212	0.12
Total votes		182,921	100.00
Democratic hold			

== City Commissioners ==
=== Democratic primary ===
==== Results ====
Democratic primary results (vote for up to 2)
Party	Candidate	Votes	%
Democratic	Stephanie Singer	37,822	19.63
Democratic	Anthony Clark (incumbent)	32,098	16.66
Democratic	Margaret Tartaglione (incumbent)	31,219	16.21
Democratic	Ivy Staten	26,240	13.62
Democratic	Michael Edward Bell	26,076	13.54
Democratic	Warren Bloom	19,918	10.34
Democratic	Blair Talmadge	19,235	9.98
Write-in		42	0.02
Total votes		192,650	100.00

=== Republican primary ===
==== Results ====
Republican primary results (vote for up to 2)
Party	Candidate	Votes	%
Republican	Joseph J. Duda (incumbent)	9,460	35.73
Republican	Al Schmidt	9,303	35.14
Republican	Marie Delany	7,689	29.04
Write-in		23	0.09
Total votes		26,475	100.00

=== General election ===
==== Results ====
2011 Philadelphia City Commissioners election (vote for up to 2)
Party	Candidate	Votes	%
Democratic	Stephanie Singer	121,477	38.99
Democratic	Anthony Clark (incumbent)	112,545	36.12
Republican	Al Schmidt	43,493	13.96
Republican	Joseph J. Duda (incumbent)	33,990	10.91
Write-in		42	0.01
Total votes		311,547	100.00

== Register of Wills ==
2011 Philadelphia register of wills election
- November 8, 2011

Candidate	Ronald Donatucci	Linda Bateman
Party	Democratic	Republican
Popular vote	123,149	36,698
Percentage	77.03%	22.95%
- Donatucci: 50–60% 60–70% 70–80% 80–90% >90% Bateman: 50–60% 60–70% Tie: 50%
Register of Wills before election
Ronald Donatucci
Democratic
Elected Register of Wills
Ronald Donatucci
Democratic

Incumbent 32-year Ronald Donatucci ran unopposed in the Democratic primary and was reelected in a landslide, winning a 9th term.

=== Democratic primary ===
==== Nominee ====
- Ronald Donatucci, incumbent Register of Wills (1980–present)

==== Results ====
Democratic primary results
Party	Candidate	Votes	%
Democratic	Ronald Donatucci (incumbent)	91,974	99.91
Write-in		84	0.09
Total votes		92,058	100.00

=== Republican primary ===
==== Nominee ====
- Linda Bateman

==== Results ====
Republican primary results
Party	Candidate	Votes	%
Republican	Linda Bateman	12,077	99.91
Write-in		11	0.09
Total votes		12,088	100.00

=== General election ===
==== Results ====
2011 Philadelphia Register of Wills election
Party	Candidate	Votes	%
Democratic	Ronald Donatucci (incumbent)	123,149	77.03
Republican	Linda Bateman	36,698	22.95
Write-in		30	0.02
Total votes		159,877	100.00
Democratic hold			

== Sheriff ==
2011 Philadelphia sheriff election
- November 8, 2011

Candidate	Jewell Williams	Joshua West	Cheri Honkala
Party	Democratic	Republican	Green
Popular vote	120,720	30,185	10,711
Percentage	74.68%	18.67%	6.63%
- Williams: 40–50% 50–60% 60–70% 70–80% 80–90% >90% West: 40–50% 50–60% 60–70% 70–80% Honkala: 40–50% Tie: 40–50% 50%
Sheriff before election
John Green
Democratic
Elected Sheriff
Jewell Williams
Democratic

Longtime incumbent sheriff John Green, who held the office since 1988, retired. State Representative Jewell Williams won the Democratic primary and general election.

=== Democratic primary ===
==== Nominee ====
- Jewell Williams, member of the Pennsylvania House of Representatives from the 197th district (2001–present)

==== Eliminated in primary ====
- John Kromer
- Jacque Whaumbush

==== Results ====
Results by ward Williams: 40%–50%; 50%–60%; 60%–70%; 70%–80%; 80%–90%; Kromer: 40%–50%; 50%–60%

Democratic primary results
Party	Candidate	Votes	%
Democratic	Jewell Williams	73,430	61.55
Democratic	John Kromer	31,785	26.64
Democratic	Jacque Whaumbush	14,044	11.77
Write-in		43	0.04
Total votes		119,302	100.00

=== Republican primary ===
==== Nominee ====
- Joshua West

==== Results ====
Republican primary results
Party	Candidate	Votes	%
Republican	Joshua West	12,346	99.88
Write-in		15	0.12
Total votes		12,361	100.00

=== General election ===
==== Results ====
2011 Philadelphia Sheriff election
Party	Candidate	Votes	%
Democratic	Jewell Williams	120,720	74.68
Republican	Joshua West	30,185	18.67
Green	Cheri Honkala	10,711	6.63
Write-in		39	0.02
Total votes		161,655	100.00
Democratic hold			

== Court of Common Pleas partisan election ==
=== Democratic primary ===
==== Results ====
Democratic primary results (vote for up to 9)
Party	Candidate	Votes	%
Democratic	Sean Kennedy	58,667	7.50
Democratic	Angelo J. Foglietta	49,067	6.27
Democratic	Diana Anhalt	45,055	5.76
Democratic	Maria McLaughlin (Note: Cross-filed for the Republican nomination.)	43,467	5.55
Democratic	Jonathan Q. Irvine	41,028	5.24
Democratic	Barbara A. McDermott	36,379	4.65
Democratic	Charles Ehrlich	34,638	4.43
Democratic	Vincent L. Johnson	34,466	4.40
Democratic	Edward C. Wright	29,502	3.77
Democratic	Carolyn H. Nichols	28,277	3.61
Democratic	Robert M. Kline	25,205	3.22
Democratic	Roger F. Gordon Jr.	23,917	3.06
Democratic	Kenneth J. Powell Jr.	23,730	3.03
Democratic	Sayde J. Ladov	23,334	2.98
Democratic	Christopher Mallios Jr.	22,935	2.93
Democratic	Michael Fanning	22,332	2.85
Democratic	Stephanie M. Sawyer	21,045	2.69
Democratic	Anne Marie Coyle	20,615	2.63
Democratic	J. Scott O'Keefe	20,611	2.63
Democratic	Daine Grey Jr.	19,397	2.48
Democratic	Harry J. Levant	17,306	2.21
Democratic	Nycole Watson	14,803	1.89
Democratic	Beverly Muldrow	13,946	1.78
Democratic	Giovanni O. Campbell	13,061	1.67
Democratic	Joseph J. O'Neill	11,987	1.53
Democratic	Drew Aldinger	11,766	1.50
Democratic	Tom Fitzpatrick	11,704	1.50
Democratic	Vince Giusini	10,177	1.30
Democratic	Leon A. King II	9,687	1.24
Democratic	Jim Divergilis	7,780	0.99
Democratic	Stephen J. Negro	6,757	0.86
Democratic	Joseph C. Waters Jr.	6,500	0.83
Democratic	Meredith Seigle-DiClaudio	6,291	0.80
Democratic	Ted J. Vigilante	6,012	0.77
Democratic	Kenneth Citrino	5,608	0.72
Democratic	Lopez T. Thompson	5,235	0.67
Democratic	Fran Shields	199	0.03
Democratic	Martin S. Coleman	174	0.02
Write-in		86	0.01
Total votes		782,746	100.00

=== Republican primary ===
==== Results ====
Republican primary results
Party	Candidate	Votes	%
Republican	Anne Marie Coyle (Note: Cross-filed for the Democratic nomination.)	11,009	19.03
Republican	Jim Divergilis	8,180	14.14
Republican	Ted J. Vigilante	7,568	13.08
Republican	Fran Shields	7,446	12.87
Republican	Maria McLaughlin	6,617	11.44
Republican	Charles Ehrlich	6,042	10.44
Republican	Kenneth J. Powell Jr.	5,825	10.07
Republican	Sayde J. Ladov	5,079	8.78
Write-in		98	0.17
Total votes		57,864	100.00

=== General election ===
==== Results ====
2011 Philadelphia Court of Common Pleas election (vote for up to 9)
Party	Candidate	Votes	%
Democratic	Maria McLaughlin	111,732	7.77
Republican	Maria McLaughlin	27,284	1.90
Total	Maria McLaughlin	139,016	9.66
Democratic	Charles Ehrlich	109,591	7.62
Republican	Charles Ehrlich	26,087	1.81
Total	Charles Ehrlich	135,678	9.43
Democratic	Barbara A. McDermott	122,833	8.54
Democratic	Sean Kennedy	121,094	8.42
Democratic	Angelo J. Foglietta	119,296	8.29
Democratic	Carolyn H. Nichols	118,207	8.22
Democratic	Diana Anhalt	115,191	8.01
Democratic	Vincent L. Johnson	114,049	7.93
Democratic	Thomas M. Nocella	113,190	7.87
Democratic	Edward C. Wright	112,817	7.84
Democratic	Jonathan Q. Irvine	111,101	7.72
Republican	Anne Marie Coyle	35,800	2.49
Republican	Kenneth J. Powell Jr.	29,352	2.04
Republican	Ted J. Vigilante	25,766	1.79
Republican	Jim Divergilis	24,824	1.73
Write-in		167	0.01
Total votes		1,438,381	100.00

== Court of Common Pleas retention elections ==
=== Results ===
Justice Joan A. Brown retention, 2011
Choice	Votes	%
For	67,670	77.35
Against	19,815	22.65
Total	87,485	100.00
Source: Philadelphia City Commissioners

Justice Denis P. Cohen retention, 2011
Choice	Votes	%
For	63,629	75.59
Against	20,542	24.41
Total	84,171	100.00
Source: Philadelphia City Commissioners

Justice Rose Marie DeFino-Nastasi retention, 2011
Choice	Votes	%
For	62,230	75.46
Against	20,239	24.54
Total	82,469	100.00
Source: Philadelphia City Commissioners

Justice Thomas Dempsey retention, 2011
Choice	Votes	%
For	61,492	75.26
Against	20,219	24.74
Total	81,711	100.00
Source: Philadelphia City Commissioners

Justice Kevin Dougherty retention, 2011
Choice	Votes	%
For	66,066	77.53
Against	19,149	22.47
Total	85,215	100.00
Source: Philadelphia City Commissioners

Justice Gary S. Glazer retention, 2011
Choice	Votes	%
For	60,264	73.86
Against	21,325	26.14
Total	81,589	100.00
Source: Philadelphia City Commissioners

Justice Elizabeth Jackson retention, 2011
Choice	Votes	%
For	61,275	75.50
Against	19,881	24.50
Total	81,156	100.00
Source: Philadelphia City Commissioners

Justice James Murray Lynn retention, 2011
Choice	Votes	%
For	54,654	67.30
Against	26,554	32.70
Total	81,208	100.00
Source: Philadelphia City Commissioners

Justice Margaret T. Murphy retention, 2011
Choice	Votes	%
For	62,468	77.28
Against	18,361	22.72
Total	80,829	100.00
Source: Philadelphia City Commissioners

Justice Arnold L. New retention, 2011
Choice	Votes	%
For	56,002	73.28
Against	20,424	26.72
Total	76,426	100.00
Source: Philadelphia City Commissioners

Justice George W. Overton retention, 2011
Choice	Votes	%
For	61,340	74.77
Against	20,703	25.23
Total	82,043	100.00
Source: Philadelphia City Commissioners

Justice Paul P. Panepinto retention, 2011
Choice	Votes	%
For	59,960	73.74
Against	21,348	26.26
Total	81,308	100.00
Source: Philadelphia City Commissioners

Justice Nitza I. Quinones Alejandro retention, 2011
Choice	Votes	%
For	58,154	73.30
Against	21,186	26.70
Total	79,340	100.00
Source: Philadelphia City Commissioners

Justice Lisa M. Rau retention, 2011
Choice	Votes	%
For	60,020	74.81
Against	20,214	25.19
Total	80,234	100.00
Source: Philadelphia City Commissioners

Justice Gregory E. Smith retention, 2011
Choice	Votes	%
For	61,157	75.19
Against	20,176	24.81
Total	81,333	100.00
Source: Philadelphia City Commissioners

Justice Albert John Snite Jr. retention, 2011
Choice	Votes	%
For	56,625	72.27
Against	21,729	27.73
Total	78,354	100.00
Source: Philadelphia City Commissioners

Justice Earl W. Trent Jr. retention, 2011
Choice	Votes	%
For	58,149	73.87
Against	20,570	26.13
Total	78,719	100.00
Source: Philadelphia City Commissioners

Justice Christopher Wogan retention, 2011
Choice	Votes	%
For	58,981	74.40
Against	20,292	25.60
Total	79,273	100.00
Source: Philadelphia City Commissioners

== Philadelphia Municipal Court partisan election ==
=== Democratic primary ===
==== Results ====
Democratic primary results (vote for up to 1)
Party	Candidate	Votes	%
Democratic	Marvin L. Williams	36,980	34.52
Democratic	Martin S. Coleman	26,701	24.92
Democratic	Anita Smith	10,426	9.73
Democratic	Derrick W. Coker	10,079	9.41
Democratic	Vincent L. Johnson	8,086	7.55
Democratic	Nycole Watson	6,433	6.00
Democratic	Kenneth Citrino	4,506	4.21
Democratic	Meredith Seigle-DiClaudio	3,642	3.40
Democratic	Kenneth J. Powell Jr.	235	0.22
Write-in		41	0.04
Total votes		107,129	100.00

=== Republican primary ===
==== Results ====
Republican primary results (vote for up to 1)
Party	Candidate	Votes	%
Republican	Kenneth J. Powell Jr.	835	95.32
Write-in		41	4.68
Total votes		876	100.00

=== General election ===
==== Results ====
2011 Philadelphia Municipal Court election (vote for up to 2)
Party	Candidate	Votes	%
Democratic	Joyce Eubanks	126,465	50.54
Democratic	Marvin L. Williams	123,693	49.43
Write-in		68	0.03
Total votes		250,226	100.00

== Philadelphia Municipal Court retention elections ==
=== Results ===
Justice James M. DeLeon retention, 2011
Choice	Votes	%
For	59,875	69.32
Against	26,502	30.68
Total	86,377	100.00
Source: Philadelphia City Commissioners

Justice Thomas F. Gehret retention, 2011
Choice	Votes	%
For	59,428	74.08
Against	20,794	25.92
Total	80,222	100.00
Source: Philadelphia City Commissioners

Justice Nazario Jimenez Jr. retention, 2011
Choice	Votes	%
For	58,937	73.15
Against	21,630	26.85
Total	80,567	100.00
Source: Philadelphia City Commissioners

Justice William A. Meehan Jr. retention, 2011
Choice	Votes	%
For	62,566	75.41
Against	20,397	24.59
Total	82,963	100.00
Source: Philadelphia City Commissioners

Justice Bradley K. Moss retention, 2011
Choice	Votes	%
For	59,109	74.70
Against	20,023	25.30
Total	79,132	100.00
Source: Philadelphia City Commissioners

Justice Harvey W. Robbins retention, 2011
Choice	Votes	%
For	60,950	74.75
Against	20,590	25.25
Total	81,540	100.00
Source: Philadelphia City Commissioners

Justice Karen Yvette Simmons retention, 2011
Choice	Votes	%
For	61,715	76.22
Against	19,252	23.78
Total	80,967	100.00
Source: Philadelphia City Commissioners

Justice David C. Shuter retention, 2011
Choice	Votes	%
For	58,984	74.06
Against	20,663	25.94
Total	79,647	100.00
Source: Philadelphia City Commissioners

== Philadelphia Traffic Court partisan election ==
=== Democratic primary ===
==== Results ====
Democratic primary results (vote for up to 1)
Party	Candidate	Votes	%
Democratic	Christine Solomon	38,543	34.72
Democratic	Carlene S. Clark	16,822	15.15
Democratic	Donna Marie Laws	10,593	9.54
Democratic	Omar Sabir	9,170	8.26
Democratic	Marnie Aument Loughrey	5,982	5.39
Democratic	Michael Horsey	5,525	4.98
Democratic	Robert Tuerk	5,284	4.76
Democratic	Richard W. Hoy	5,051	4.55
Democratic	Frederick C. Mari Jr	4,968	4.47
Democratic	Jose A. Figueroa	4,915	4.43
Democratic	John Adams	2,418	2.18
Democratic	Lewis Harris Jr.	1,729	1.56
Write-in		23	0.02
Total votes		111,023	100.00

=== Republican primary ===
==== Results ====
Republican primary results (vote for up to 1)
Party	Candidate	Votes	%
Republican	Lewis Harris Jr.	11,469	99.83
Write-in		19	0.17
Total votes		11,488	100.00

=== General election ===
==== Results ====
2011 Philadelphia Traffic Court election (vote for up to 1)
Party	Candidate	Votes	%
Democratic	Christine Solomon	127,183	82.06
Republican	Lewis Harris Jr.	27,776	17.92
Write-in		31	0.02
Total votes		154,990	100.00

== Philadelphia Traffic Court retention elections ==
Justice Michael J. Sullivan retention, 2011
Choice	Votes	%
For	74,223	77.37
Against	21,710	22.63
Total	95,933	100.00
Source: Philadelphia City Commissioners

== Ballot questions ==
One ballot question appeared on the primary ballot and two questions appeared on the general ballot. All three questions passed.

=== Primary election ===
Proposed Charter Change 1: Create an independent city Jobs Commission
Choice	Votes	%
For	55,372	62.43
Against	33,327	37.57
Total	88,699	100.00
Source: Philadelphia City Commissioners

=== General election ===
Proposed Charter Change 1: Create a mandatory Budget Stabilization Reserve ("rainy day fund")
Choice	Votes	%
For	79,786	71.95
Against	31,099	28.05
Total	110,885	100.00
Source: Philadelphia City Commissioners

Authorize $111.295 million in bonds for capital projects
Choice	Votes	%
For	71,656	65.08
Against	38,450	34.92
Total	110,106	100.00
Source: Philadelphia City Commissioners
