= 2007 Philadelphia municipal election =

2007 Pennsylvania local election

2007 Philadelphia elections
- November 6, 2007

A general election was held in Philadelphia, Pennsylvania on November 6, 2007, to elect various county and city-level positions. The primary election was held May 15, 2007.

== Mayor ==
=== Results ===
2007 Philadelphia mayoral election
Party	Candidate	Votes	%
Democratic	Michael Nutter	227,090	82.52
Republican	Al Taubenberger	46,984	17.07
Socialist Workers	John Staggs	1,038	0.38
Write-in		78	0.03
Total votes		275,190	100.00
Democratic hold			

== City Commissioners ==
=== Democratic primary ===
==== Results ====
Democratic primary results (vote for up to 2)
Party	Candidate	Votes	%
Democratic	Margaret Tartaglione (incumbent)	118,717	42.32
Democratic	Anthony Clark	73,428	26.17
Democratic	Edgar Howard (incumbent)	47,425	16.90
Democratic	B. Blair Talmadge	40,952	14.60
Write-in		30	0.01
Total votes		280,552	100.00

=== Republican primary ===
==== Results ====
Republican primary results (vote for up to 2)
Party	Candidate	Votes	%
Republican	Joseph J. Duda (incumbent)	12,560	51.14
Republican	Patrick J. Carroll	11,985	48.79
Write-in		17	0.07
Total votes		24,562	100.00

=== General election ===
==== Results ====
2007 Philadelphia City Commissioners election (vote for up to 2)
Party	Candidate	Votes	%
Democratic	Margaret Tartaglione (incumbent)	181,994	43.99
Democratic	Anthony Clark	154,517	37.35
Republican	Joseph J. Duda (incumbent)	35,911	8.68
Republican	Patrick J. Carroll	33,567	8.11
Green	Lewis Harris Jr.	7,731	1.87
Write-in		30	0.01
Total votes		413,750	100.00

== Clerk of Quarter Sessions ==
2007 Philadelphia clerk of quarter sessions election
- November 6, 2007

Candidate	Vivian Miller	John Featherman
Party	Democratic	Republican
Popular vote	178,250	37,974
Percentage	82.43%	17.56%
- Miller: 50–60% 60–70% 70–80% 80–90% >90% Featherman: 50–60% 60–70% Tie: 50% No data
Clerk before election
Vivian Miller
Democratic
Elected Clerk
Vivian Miller
Democratic

Incumbent Clerk Vivian Miller won reelection to a fifth term in a landslide. This was the last regularly scheduled election for the Clerk of Quarter Sessions, as Mayor Michael Nutter abolished the position in October 2010. The office's duties were transferred to the Philadelphia County court system.

=== Democratic primary ===
==== Nominee ====
- Vivian Miller, incumbent Clerk (1992–present)

==== Eliminated in primary ====
- A. Elaine Tomlin

==== Results ====
Results by ward Miller: 50%–60%; 60%–70%; 70%–80%; 80%–90%; Tomlin: 50%–60%; 60%–70%

Democratic primary results
Party	Candidate	Votes	%
Democratic	Vivian Miller (incumbent)	112,551	69.51
Democratic	A. Elaine Tomlin	49,360	30.48
Write-in		17	0.01
Total votes		161,928	100.00

=== Republican primary ===
==== Nominee ====
- John Featherman

==== Results ====
Republican primary results
Party	Candidate	Votes	%
Republican	John Featherman	14,039	99.94
Write-in		8	0.06
Total votes		14,047	100.00

=== General election ===
==== Results ====
2007 Philadelphia Clerk of Quarter Sessions election
Party	Candidate	Votes	%
Democratic	Vivian Miller (incumbent)	178,250	82.43
Republican	John Featherman	37,974	17.56
Write-in		12	0.01
Total votes		216,236	100.00
Democratic hold			

== Register of Wills ==
2007 Philadelphia register of wills election
- November 6, 2007

Candidate	Ronald Donatucci	Dan Salvatore
Party	Democratic	Republican
Popular vote	177,452	37,165
Percentage	82.68%	17.32%
- Donatucci: 50–60% 60–70% 70–80% 80–90% >90% Salvatore: 50–60% 60–70% Tie: 50% No data
Register of Wills before election
Ronald Donatucci
Democratic
Elected Register of Wills
Ronald Donatucci
Democratic

Incumbent 28-year Ronald Donatucci ran unopposed in the Democratic primary and was reelected in a landslide, winning an 8th term.

=== Democratic primary ===
==== Nominee ====
- Ronald Donatucci, incumbent Register of Wills (1980–present)

==== Results ====
Democratic primary results
Party	Candidate	Votes	%
Democratic	Ronald Donatucci (incumbent)	145,398	99.97
Write-in		38	0.03
Total votes		145,436	100.00

=== Republican primary ===
==== Nominee ====
- Dan Salvatore

==== Results ====
Republican primary results
Party	Candidate	Votes	%
Republican	Dan Salvatore	14,364	99.94
Write-in		9	0.06
Total votes		14,373	100.00

=== General election ===
==== Results ====
2007 Philadelphia Register of Wills election
Party	Candidate	Votes	%
Democratic	Ronald Donatucci (incumbent)	177,452	82.68
Republican	Dan Salvatore	37,165	17.32
Write-in		20	0.00
Total votes		214,637	100.00
Democratic hold			

== Sheriff ==
2007 Philadelphia sheriff election
- November 6, 2007
Candidate	John Green
Party	Democratic
Popular vote	203,145
Percentage	97.42%
Sheriff before election
John Green
Democratic
Elected Sheriff
John Green
Democratic

Incumbent Sheriff John Green won reelection in a landslide to a sixth term in office.

=== Democratic primary ===
==== Nominee ====
- John Green, incumbent Sheriff (1988–present)

==== Eliminated in primary ====
- Michael Untermeyer
- Jacque Whaumbush

==== Results ====
Results by ward Green: 40%–50%; 50%–60%; 60%–70%; 70%–80%; 80%–90%; Untermeyer: 50%–60%; 70%–80%

Democratic primary results
Party	Candidate	Votes	%
Democratic	John Green (incumbent)	136,260	67.52
Democratic	Michael Untermeyer	63,145	31.29
Democratic	Jacque Whaumbush	2,391	1.18
Write-in		15	0.01
Total votes		201,811	100.00

=== Republican primary ===
==== Results ====
Republican primary results
Party	Candidate	Votes	%
	Write-in	95	100.00
Total votes		95	100.00

=== General election ===
==== Results ====
2007 Philadelphia Sheriff election
Party	Candidate	Votes	%
Democratic	John Green (incumbent)	203,145	97.42
Independent	Jacque Whaumbush	5,310	2.55
Write-in		67	0.03
Total votes		208,522	100.00
Democratic hold			

== Court of Common Pleas partisan election ==
=== Democratic primary ===
==== Results ====
Democratic primary results (vote for up to 4)
Party	Candidate	Votes	%
Democratic	Linda Carpenter	77,101	13.96
Democratic	Alice Beck Dubow (Note: Cross-filed for the Republican nomination.)	63,877	11.57
Democratic	Ellen Green Ceisler	46,888	8.49
Democratic	Michael Erdos	45,613	8.26
Democratic	Beverly Muldrow	42,535	7.70
Democratic	Robert Coleman	38,567	6.98
Democratic	Joseph T. Murphy Jr.	37,650	6.82
Democratic	Angeles Roca	31,444	5.69
Democratic	J. Scott O'Keefe	30,759	5.57
Democratic	Greg Coleman	30,375	5.50
Democratic	Thomas M. Nocella	22,208	4.02
Democratic	Gerard P. Shotzbarger	21,433	3.88
Democratic	Marvin L. Williams	18,148	3.29
Democratic	Christian H. Clemente	14,189	2.57
Democratic	Thomas Martin	13,953	2.53
Democratic	Elvin Ross III	9,625	1.74
Democratic	Rosa Ryan	7,120	1.29
Democratic	Joyce Eubanks	597	0.11
Democratic	Dan Anders	197	0.04
Write-in		38	0.01
Total votes		552,317	100.00

=== Republican primary ===
==== Results ====
Republican primary results
Party	Candidate	Votes	%
Republican	Joseph T. Murphy Jr. (Note: Cross-filed for the Democratic nomination.)	12,568	28.42
Republican	Alice Beck Dubow	9,314	21.06
Republican	Michael Erdos	7,743	17.51
Republican	Joyce Eubanks	7,358	16.64
Republican	Marvin L. Williams	7,222	16.33
Write-in		17	0.04
Total votes		44,222	100.00

=== General election ===
==== Results ====
2007 Philadelphia Court of Common Pleas election (vote for up to 4)
Party	Candidate	Votes	%
Democratic	Alice Beck Dubow	156,038	20.67
Republican	Alice Beck Dubow	28,216	3.74
Total	Alice Beck Dubow	184,254	24.41
Democratic	Ellen Green Ceisler	155,546	20.61
Republican	Ellen Green Ceisler	28,317	3.75
Total	Ellen Green Ceisler	183,863	24.36
Democratic	Michael Erdos	149,790	19.85
Republican	Michael Erdos	27,005	3.58
Total	Michael Erdos	176,795	23.42
Democratic	Linda Carpenter	170,842	22.64
Republican	Joyce Eubanks	38,934	5.16
Write-in		51	0.01
Total votes		754,739	100.00

== Court of Common Pleas retention elections ==
=== Results ===
Justice M. Bernstein retention, 2007
Choice	Votes	%
For	91,586	76.03
Against	28,876	23.97
Total	120,462	100.00
Source: Philadelphia City Commissioners

Justice G. DiVito retention, 2007
Choice	Votes	%
For	81,321	73.86
Against	28,779	26.14
Total	110,100	100.00
Source: Philadelphia City Commissioners

Justice J. Herron retention, 2007
Choice	Votes	%
For	87,686	75.15
Against	29,000	24.85
Total	116,686	100.00
Source: Philadelphia City Commissioners

Justice C. Jones II retention, 2007
Choice	Votes	%
For	80,966	73.89
Against	28,615	26.11
Total	109,581	100.00
Source: Philadelphia City Commissioners

Justice B. Joseph retention, 2007
Choice	Votes	%
For	92,194	77.66
Against	26,525	22.34
Total	118,719	100.00
Source: Philadelphia City Commissioners

Justice S. Robins New retention, 2007
Choice	Votes	%
For	79,985	74.45
Against	27,446	25.55
Total	107,431	100.00
Source: Philadelphia City Commissioners

Justice R. Robinson retention, 2007
Choice	Votes	%
For	88,606	76.22
Against	27,650	23.78
Total	116,256	100.00
Source: Philadelphia City Commissioners

Justice P. Rogers retention, 2007
Choice	Votes	%
For	78,214	73.44
Against	28,293	26.56
Total	106,507	100.00
Source: Philadelphia City Commissioners

Justice M. Sarmina retention, 2007
Choice	Votes	%
For	88,565	75.90
Against	28,119	24.10
Total	116,684	100.00
Source: Philadelphia City Commissioners

Justice E. Summers retention, 2007
Choice	Votes	%
For	81,155	74.45
Against	27,854	25.55
Total	109,009	100.00
Source: Philadelphia City Commissioners

== Philadelphia Municipal Court partisan election ==
=== Democratic primary ===
==== Results ====
Democratic primary results (vote for up to 2)
Party	Candidate	Votes	%
Democratic	Joseph J. O'Neill	66,579	23.17
Democratic	Jacquelyn Frazier-Lyde	48,812	16.99
Democratic	Joyce Eubanks	46,118	16.05
Democratic	Diane Thompson	37,265	12.97
Democratic	Sean F. Kennedy	36,547	12.72
Democratic	Joseph C. Waters Jr.	31,869	11.09
Democratic	Sandjai Weaver	12,052	4.19
Democratic	Robert M. Kline	8,062	2.81
Write-in		24	0.01
Total votes		287,328	100.00

=== Republican primary ===
==== Results ====
Republican primary results (vote for up to 2)
Party	Candidate	Votes	%
Republican	Joseph T. Murphy Jr.	13,394	56.06
Republican	Joseph C. Waters Jr.	10,491	43.91
Write-in		7	0.03
Total votes		23,892	100.00

=== General election ===
==== Results ====
2007 Philadelphia Municipal Court election (vote for up to 2)
Party	Candidate	Votes	%
Democratic	Joseph J. O'Neill	169,197	45.88
Republican	Joseph J. O'Neill	31,385	8.51
Total	Joseph J. O'Neill	200,582	54.40
Democratic	Jacquelyn Frazier-Lyde	168,102	45.59
Write-in		65	0.02
Total votes		368,749	100.00

== Philadelphia Municipal Court retention elections ==
=== Results ===
Justice Teresa Carr Deni retention, 2007
Choice	Votes	%
For	77,431	66.07
Against	39,758	33.93
Total	117,189	100.00
Source: Philadelphia City Commissioners

Justice G. Daher retention, 2007
Choice	Votes	%
For	79,418	68.28
Against	36,894	31.72
Total	116,312	100.00
Source: Philadelphia City Commissioners

Justice D. Griffin retention, 2007
Choice	Votes	%
For	83,531	71.20
Against	33,788	28.80
Total	117,319	100.00
Source: Philadelphia City Commissioners

Justice R. Merriweather retention, 2007
Choice	Votes	%
For	91,215	77.07
Against	27,146	22.93
Total	118,361	100.00
Source: Philadelphia City Commissioners

Justice W. Pew retention, 2007
Choice	Votes	%
For	86,316	76.00
Against	27,258	24.00
Total	113,574	100.00
Source: Philadelphia City Commissioners

Justice L. Presenza retention, 2007
Choice	Votes	%
For	85,546	75.16
Against	28,276	24.84
Total	113,822	100.00
Source: Philadelphia City Commissioners

== Philadelphia Traffic Court partisan election ==
=== Democratic primary ===
==== Results ====
Democratic primary results (vote for up to 3)
Party	Candidate	Votes	%
Democratic	Willie Singletary	48,319	12.80
Democratic	Robert Mulgrew	43,006	11.39
Democratic	Mike Lowry	41,074	10.88
Democratic	Wayne A. Johns	32,646	8.65
Democratic	Sandra A. Mills	29,514	7.82
Democratic	Bernard A. Strain	29,036	7.69
Democratic	Frederick C. Mari Jr.	27,969	7.41
Democratic	Albert C. Littlepage Jr.	26,502	7.02
Democratic	Betty A. Townes	19,772	5.24
Democratic	Scott Cummings	18,073	4.79
Democratic	Helen Hellon D. Divers	17,567	4.65
Democratic	Brenda Reavis	12,179	3.23
Democratic	Curtis Alton McCallister	11,541	3.06
Democratic	John Connelly	10,985	2.91
Democratic	Candido Silva Jr.	9,288	2.46
Write-in		35	0.01
Total votes		377,506	100.00

=== Republican primary ===
==== Results ====
Republican primary results (vote for up to 3)
Party	Candidate	Votes	%
Republican	Scott Cummings	12,661	38.65
Republican	Bernard A. Strain	10,053	30.69
Republican	Frederick C. Mari Jr.	10,031	30.62
Write-in		16	0.05
Total votes		32,761	100.00

=== General election ===
==== Results ====
2007 Philadelphia Traffic Court election (vote for up to 3)
Party	Candidate	Votes	%
Democratic	Mike Lowry	157,405	28.08
Democratic	Robert Mulgrew	153,724	27.42
Democratic	Willie Singletary	144,519	25.78
Republican	Scott Cummmings	41,818	7.46
Republican	Bernard A. Strain	32,382	5.78
Republican	Frederick C. Mari Jr.	30,647	5.47
Write-in		39	0.01
Total votes		560,534	100.00

== Philadelphia Traffic Court retention elections ==
=== Results ===
Justice T. Tynes retention, 2007
Choice	Votes	%
For	95,698	74.41
Against	32,917	25.59
Total	128,615	100.00
Source: Philadelphia City Commissioners

== Ballot questions ==
Nine ballot questions appeared on the primary ballot and four questions appeared on the general ballot. All except for one question on the primary ballot passed.

=== Primary election ===
Proposed Charter Change 1
Choice	Votes	%
For	3,191	65.82
Against	1,657	34.18
Total	4,848	100.00
Source: Philadelphia City Commissioners

Proposed Charter Change 2
Choice	Votes	%
For	91,171	44.84
Against	112,151	55.16
Total	203,322	100.00
Source: Philadelphia City Commissioners

Proposed Charter Change 3
Choice	Votes	%
For	138,459	68.07
Against	64,938	31.93
Total	203,397	100.00
Source: Philadelphia City Commissioners

Proposed Charter Change 4
Choice	Votes	%
For	160,800	81.12
Against	37,428	18.88
Total	198,228	100.00
Source: Philadelphia City Commissioners

Proposed Charter Change 5
Choice	Votes	%
For	136,577	70.88
Against	56,112	29.12
Total	192,689	100.00
Source: Philadelphia City Commissioners

Proposed Charter Change 6
Choice	Votes	%
For	151,544	78.88
Against	40,587	21.12
Total	192,131	100.00
Source: Philadelphia City Commissioners

Proposed Charter Change 7
Choice	Votes	%
For	140,293	71.84
Against	54,981	28.16
Total	195,274	100.00
Source: Philadelphia City Commissioners

Proposed Charter Change 9
Choice	Votes	%
For	133,848	70.38
Against	56,337	29.62
Total	190,185	100.00
Source: Philadelphia City Commissioners

Proposed Bond
Choice	Votes	%
For	126,545	64.55
Against	69,488	35.45
Total	196,033	100.00
Source: Philadelphia City Commissioners

=== General election ===
Proposed Charter Change 1: Require Councilmembers to be residents of their districts for one year prior to election
Choice	Votes	%
For	129,379	76.21
Against	40,393	23.79
Total	169,772	100.00
Source: Philadelphia City Commissioners

Proposed Charter Change 2: Create a Public School Family and Child Advocate position
Choice	Votes	%
For	105,629	63.41
Against	60,948	36.59
Total	166,577	100.00
Source: Philadelphia City Commissioners

Proposed Charter Change 3: Create a Handicapped and Disabled Advocate position
Choice	Votes	%
For	107,840	66.80
Against	53,586	33.20
Total	161,426	100.00
Source: Philadelphia City Commissioners

Authorize $55.09 million in bonds for capital projects
Choice	Votes	%
For	102,997	64.64
Against	56,336	35.36
Total	159,333	100.00
Source: Philadelphia City Commissioners
