= 2005 Philadelphia municipal election =

2005 Pennsylvania local election

2005 Philadelphia elections
- November 8, 2005

A general election was held in Philadelphia, Pennsylvania on November 8, 2005, to elect various county and city-level positions. The primary election was held on May 17, 2005.

== District Attorney ==
2005 Philadelphia district attorney election
- November 8, 2005
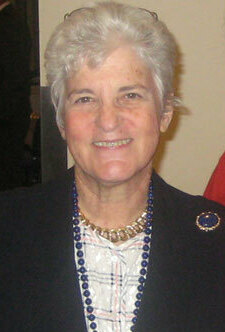

Candidate	Lynne Abraham	Louis Schwartz
Party	Democratic	Republican
Popular vote	98,419	21,880
Percentage	81.73%	18.17%
- Abraham: 50–60% 60–70% 70–80% 80–90% >90% Schwartz: 50–60% 60–70% Tie: 50% No data
District Attorney before election
Lynne Abraham
Democratic
Elected District Attorney
Lynne Abraham
Democratic

Incumbent District Attorney Lynne Abraham won reelection to a fourth term in a landslide.

=== Democratic primary ===
==== Nominee ====
- Lynne Abraham, incumbent district attorney (1991–present)

==== Eliminated in primary ====
- Seth Williams, former assistant district attorney and Philadelphia Inspector General

==== Results ====
Results by ward Abraham: 50%–60%; 60%–70%; 70%–80%; 80%–90%; Williams: 50%–60%; 60%–70%; 70%–80%; Tie: 40%–50%

Democratic primary results
Party	Candidate	Votes	%
Democratic	Lynne Abraham (incumbent)	61,067	55.72
Democratic	Seth Williams	48,389	44.15
Write-in		133	0.12
Total votes		109,589	100.00

=== Republican primary ===
==== Nominee ====
- Louis S. Schwartz

==== Results ====
Republican primary results
Party	Candidate	Votes	%
Republican	Louis S. Schwartz	10,636	99.60
Write-in		43	0.40
Total votes		10,679	100.00

=== General election ===
2005 Philadelphia District Attorney election
Party	Candidate	Votes	%
Democratic	Lynne Abraham (incumbent)	98,419	81.73
Republican	Louis S. Schwartz	21,880	18.17
Write-in		125	0.10
Total votes		120,424	100.00
Democratic hold			

== City Controller ==
2005 Philadelphia city controller election
- November 8, 2005

Candidate	Alan Butkovitz	Hillel Levinson
Party	Democratic	Republican
Popular vote	80,888	31,915
Percentage	71.59%	28.25%
- Butkovitz: 50–60% 60–70% 70–80% 80–90% >90% Levinson: 50–60% 60–70% 70–80% Tie: 40–50% 50%
City Controller before election
Jonathan Saidel
Democratic
Elected City Controller
Alan Butkovitz
Democratic

Incumbent City Controller Jonathan Saidel, who had been in office since 1990, retired. He was succeeded by State Representative Alan Butkovitz.

=== Democratic primary ===
==== Nominee ====
- Alan Butkovitz, member of the Pennsylvania House of Representatives from the 174th district (1991–present)

==== Eliminated in primary ====
- John L. Braxton

==== Results ====
Democratic primary results
Party	Candidate	Votes	%
Democratic	Alan Butkovitz	68,764	93.66
Democratic	John L. Braxton	908	1.24
Write-in		3,743	5.10
Total votes		73,415	100.00

=== Republican primary ===
==== Nominee ====
- Hillel S. Levinson

==== Results ====
Republican primary results
Party	Candidate	Votes	%
Republican	Hillel S. Levinson	10,865	99.66
Write-in		37	0.34
Total votes		10,902	100.00

=== General election ===
2005 Philadelphia City Controller election
Party	Candidate	Votes	%
Democratic	Alan Butkovitz	80,888	71.59
Republican	Hillel S. Levinson	31,915	28.25
Voters for Frazier	Paris L. Frazier III	91	0.08
Write-in		86	0.08
Total votes		112,980	100.00
Democratic hold			

== Court of Common Pleas partisan election ==
=== Democratic primary ===
==== Results ====
Democratic primary results (vote for up to 8)
Party	Candidate	Votes	%
Democratic	Frank Palumbo	43,290	7.73
Democratic	Susan I. Schulman (Note: Cross-filed for the Republican nomination.)	37,985	6.79
Democratic	Lisette Shirdan-Harris	37,190	6.64
Democratic	Leon W. Tucker	34,287	6.13
Democratic	Glenn B. Bronson	32,868	5.87
Democratic	Walter J. Olszewski	29,916	5.34
Democratic	Ann M. Butchart	28,103	5.02
Democratic	Charles J. Cunningham	28,086	5.02
Democratic	Ellen Green-Ceisler	26,721	4.77
Democratic	Sharon Williams-Losier	26,671	4.76
Democratic	Marilyn Heffley	25,644	4.58
Democratic	Joyce Eubanks	24,375	4.35
Democratic	Marvin L. Williams	20,998	3.75
Democratic	Thomas Martin	19,792	3.54
Democratic	Vivienne A. Crawford	18,032	3.22
Democratic	Ira B. Shrager	17,974	3.21
Democratic	Sandjai Weaver	17,788	3.18
Democratic	Christian H. Clemente	17,603	3.14
Democratic	Thomas Nocella	17,570	3.14
Democratic	Linda Carpenter	14,876	2.66
Democratic	Cateria R. McCabe	13,554	2.42
Democratic	Meredith Seigle-McClaudio	13,029	2.33
Democratic	Michael L. Nix	12,862	2.30
Democratic	Robert P. Coleman	190	0.03
Democratic	Joseph J. O'Neill	137	0.02
Write-in		214	0.04
Total votes		559,755	100.00

=== Republican primary ===
==== Results ====
Republican primary results
Party	Candidate	Votes	%
Republican	Susan I. Schulman (Note: Cross-filed for the Democratic nomination.)	10,068	13.72
Republican	Charles J. Cunningham	9,991	13.62
Republican	Walter J. Olszewski	9,513	12.97
Republican	Marilyn Heffley	9,262	12.63
Republican	Glenn B. Bronson	8,861	12.08
Republican	Joyce Eubanks	8,824	12.03
Republican	Leon W. Tucker	8,585	11.70
Republican	Marvin L. Williams	8,203	11.18
Write-in		52	0.07
Total votes		73,359	100.00

=== General election ===
==== Results ====
2005 Philadelphia Court of Common Pleas election (vote for up to 8)
Party	Candidate	Votes	%
Democratic	Leon W. Tucker	77,489	10.41
Republican	Leon W. Tucker	16,789	2.26
Total	Leon W. Tucker	94,278	12.66
Democratic	Charles J. Cunningham	76,161	10.23
Republican	Charles J. Cunningham	17,495	2.35
Total	Charles J. Cunningham	93,656	12.58
Democratic	Frank Palumbo	75,638	10.16
Republican	Frank Palumbo	17,618	2.37
Total	Frank Palumbo	93,256	12.53
Democratic	Susan I. Schulman	75,673	10.16
Republican	Susan I. Schulman	17,140	2.30
Total	Susan I. Schulman	92,813	12.47
Democratic	Glenn B. Bronson	73,719	9.90
Republican	Glenn B. Bronson	16,513	2.22
Total	Glenn B. Bronson	90,232	12.12
Democratic	Walter J. Olszewski	69,609	9.35
Republican	Walter J. Olszewski	16,465	2.21
Total	Walter J. Olszewski	86,074	11.56
Democratic	Ann M. Butchart	74,503	10.01
Democratic	Lisette Shirdan-Harris	73,027	9.81
Republican	Joyce Eubanks	23,483	3.15
Republican	Marilyn Heffley	23,062	3.10
Write-in		118	0.02
Total votes		744,502	100.00

== Court of Common Pleas retention election ==
=== Results ===
Justice Willis W. Berry Jr. retention, 2005
Choice	Votes	%
For	49,925	81.25
Against	11,524	18.75
Total	61,449	100.00
Source: Philadelphia City Commissioners

Justice Gwendolyn N. Bright retention, 2005
Choice	Votes	%
For	47,656	81.31
Against	10,951	18.69
Total	58,607	100.00
Source: Philadelphia City Commissioners

Justice Renee Cardwell-Hughes retention, 2005
Choice	Votes	%
For	47,171	81.78
Against	10,512	18.22
Total	57,683	100.00
Source: Philadelphia City Commissioners

Justice Matthew D. Carrafiello retention, 2005
Choice	Votes	%
For	45,926	81.41
Against	10,490	18.59
Total	56,416	100.00
Source: Philadelphia City Commissioners

Justice Amanda Cooperman retention, 2005
Choice	Votes	%
For	44,112	82.13
Against	9,598	17.87
Total	53,710	100.00
Source: Philadelphia City Commissioners

Justice Idee C. Fox retention, 2005
Choice	Votes	%
For	46,741	80.12
Against	11,600	19.88
Total	58,341	100.00
Source: Philadelphia City Commissioners

Justice Marlene F. Lachman retention, 2005
Choice	Votes	%
For	44,227	80.98
Against	10,391	19.02
Total	54,618	100.00
Source: Philadelphia City Commissioners

Justice Patricia A. McInerney retention, 2005
Choice	Votes	%
For	44,554	82.88
Against	9,202	17.12
Total	53,756	100.00
Source: Philadelphia City Commissioners

Justice Lillian H. Ransom retention, 2005
Choice	Votes	%
For	48,306	82.14
Against	10,505	17.86
Total	58,811	100.00
Source: Philadelphia City Commissioners

Justice Esther R. Sylvester retention, 2005
Choice	Votes	%
For	47,698	81.23
Against	11,019	18.77
Total	58,717	100.00
Source: Philadelphia City Commissioners

Justice John M. Younge retention, 2005
Choice	Votes	%
For	43,200	80.03
Against	10,781	19.97
Total	53,981	100.00
Source: Philadelphia City Commissioners

== Philadelphia Municipal Court partisan election ==
=== Democratic primary ===
==== Results ====
Democratic primary results (vote for up to 4)
Party	Candidate	Votes	%
Democratic	Brad Moss	58,607	29.20
Democratic	Karen Simmons	42,395	21.12
Democratic	David C. Shuter	40,348	20.10
Democratic	Nazario Jimenez	36,621	18.25
Democratic	Beverly N. Muldrow	21,092	10.51
Democratic	Joseph J. O'Neill	853	0.43
Democratic	Thomas Nocella	671	0.33
Write-in		117	0.06
Total votes		200,704	100.00

=== Republican primary ===
==== Results ====
Republican primary results
Party	Candidate	Votes	%
Republican	Brad Moss	10,384	36.36
Republican	Charles J. Cunningham	10,150	35.54
Republican	Nazario Jimenez	8,006	28.03
Write-in		19	0.07
Total votes		28,559	100.00

=== General election ===
==== Results ====
2005 Philadelphia Municipal Court election (vote for up to 4)
Party	Candidate	Votes	%
Democratic	Brad Moss	78,162	20.78
Republican	Brad Moss	17,327	4.61
Total	Brad Moss	95,489	25.38
Democratic	David C. Shuter	73,995	19.67
Republican	David C. Shuter	17,057	4.53
Total	David C. Shuter	91,052	24.20
Democratic	Nazario Jimenez	74,808	19.89
Republican	Nazario Jimenez	16,218	4.31
Total	Nazario Jimenez	91,026	24.20
Democratic	Karen Simmons	80,493	21.40
Republican	Min S. Suh	18,076	4.81
Write-in		43	0.01
Total votes		376,179	100.00

== Philadelphia Municipal Court retention election ==
=== Results ===
Justice Linda F. Anderson retention, 2005
Choice	Votes	%
For	50,149	83.71
Against	9,757	16.29
Total	59,906	100.00
Source: Philadelphia City Commissioners

Justice James M. DeLeon retention, 2005
Choice	Votes	%
For	46,548	81.11
Against	10,844	18.89
Total	57,392	100.00
Source: Philadelphia City Commissioners

Justice Thomas F. Gehret retention, 2005
Choice	Votes	%
For	41,964	79.16
Against	11,047	20.84
Total	53,011	100.00
Source: Philadelphia City Commissioners

Justice William A. Meehan Jr. retention, 2005
Choice	Votes	%
For	45,122	81.35
Against	10,347	18.65
Total	55,469	100.00
Source: Philadelphia City Commissioners

Justice Jimmie Moore retention, 2005
Choice	Votes	%
For	45,198	76.56
Against	13,836	23.44
Total	59,034	100.00
Source: Philadelphia City Commissioners

Justice Harvey W. Robbins retention, 2005
Choice	Votes	%
For	43,698	79.67
Against	11,148	20.33
Total	54,846	100.00
Source: Philadelphia City Commissioners

Justice Alan K. Silberstein retention, 2005
Choice	Votes	%
For	44,458	79.57
Against	11,414	20.43
Total	55,872	100.00
Source: Philadelphia City Commissioners

== Philadelphia Traffic Court partisan election ==
=== Democratic primary ===
==== Results ====
Democratic primary results (vote for up to 1)
Party	Candidate	Votes	%
Democratic	Michael J. Sullivan	46,989	56.19
Democratic	Michael Horsey	21,351	25.53
Democratic	John Furey	14,913	17.83
Democratic	Albert Littlepage	269	0.32
Write-in		102	0.12
Total votes		83,624	100.00

=== Republican primary ===
==== Results ====
Republican primary results (vote for up to 1)
Party	Candidate	Votes	%
Republican	Michael Horsey	10,006	99.69
Write-in		31	0.31
Total votes		10,037	100.00

=== General election ===
2005 Philadelphia Traffic Court election (vote for up to 1)
Party	Candidate	Votes	%
Democratic	Michael J. Sullivan	83,537	79.60
Republican	Michael Horsey	21,384	20.38
Write-in		29	0.03
Total votes		104,950	100.00

== Philadelphia Traffic Court retention election ==
=== Results ===
Justice Willie Bill Adams retention, 2005
Choice	Votes	%
For	47,535	79.66
Against	12,136	20.34
Total	59,671	100.00
Source: Philadelphia City Commissioners

== Ballot Questions ==
Two ballot questions appeared on the primary ballot, including a statewide bond measure, and one question appeared on the general ballot. All questions passed.

=== Primary ballot ===
Primary proposal results by ward Yes: 60%–70%; 70%–80%; 80%–90%; 90%–100%

Charter Proposal 1: Call upon the Pennsylvania State Government to pass legislation to allow Philadelphia to enact gun control laws
Choice	Votes	%
For	66,598	81.85
Against	14,769	18.15
Total	81,367	100.00
Source: Philadelphia City Commissioners

=== General ballot ===
General proposal results by ward Yes: 60%–70%; 70%–80%; 80%–90%; 90%–100%

Charter Proposal 1: Require financial and campaign disclosures of city contracts and City Council regulation of contract awards
Choice	Votes	%
For	75,302	86.50
Against	11,749	13.50
Total	87,051	100.00
Source: Philadelphia City Commissioners
