= 2003 Philadelphia municipal election =

2003 Pennsylvania local election

2003 Philadelphia elections
- November 4, 2003

A general election was held in Philadelphia, Pennsylvania on November 4, 2003, to elect various county and city-level positions. The primary election was held on May 20, 2003.

== Mayor ==
=== Results ===
2003 Philadelphia mayoral election
Party	Candidate	Votes	%
Democratic	John F. Street (incumbent)	267,276	58.35
Republican	Sam Katz	189,357	41.34
Socialist Workers	John Staggs	1,292	0.28
Write-in		164	0.04
Total votes		458,089	100.00
Democratic hold			

== City Commissioners ==
=== Democratic primary ===
==== Results ====
Democratic primary results (vote for up to 2)
Party	Candidate	Votes	%
Democratic	Margaret Tartaglione (incumbent)	72,652	41.89
Democratic	Anthony Clark	30,800	17.76
Democratic	Edgar Howard (incumbent)	27,809	16.03
Democratic	Sandra A. Mills	22,500	12.97
Democratic	Warren Bloom	13,309	7.67
Democratic	Donna Rae Aument	6,343	3.66
Write-in		22	0.01
Total votes		173,435	100.00

=== Republican primary ===
==== Results ====
Republican primary results (vote for up to 2)
Party	Candidate	Votes	%
Republican	Joseph J. Duda (incumbent)	13,371	53.77
Republican	Bruce M. Reed	11,481	46.17
Write-in		15	0.06
Total votes		24,867	100.00

=== General election ===
==== Results ====
2003 Philadelphia City Commissioners election (vote for up to 2)
Party	Candidate	Votes	%
Democratic	Margaret Tartaglione (incumbent)	292,846	40.52
Democratic	Edgar Howard (incumbent)	252,316	34.91
Republican	Joseph J. Duda (incumbent)	92,921	12.86
Republican	Bruce M. Reed	84,557	11.70
Write-in		41	0.01
Total votes		722,681	100.00

== Clerk of Quarter Sessions ==
2003 Philadelphia clerk of quarter sessions election
- November 4, 2003

Candidate	Vivian Miller	Marcus Mitchell
Party	Democratic	Republican
Popular vote	271,833	84,059
Percentage	76.38%	23.62%
- Miller: 50–60% 60–70% 70–80% 80–90% >90% Mitchell: 50–60% 60–70% 70–80% 80–90% Tie: 50%
Clerk before election
Vivian Miller
Democratic
Elected Clerk
Vivian Miller
Democratic

Incumbent Clerk Vivian Miller won reelection to a fourth term in a landslide.

=== Democratic primary ===
==== Nominee ====
- Vivian Miller, incumbent Clerk (1992–present)

==== Eliminated in primary ====
- Helen Hellon-Divers

==== Results ====
Results by ward Miller: 50%–60%; 60%–70%; 70%–80%; 80%–90%; Hellon-Divers: 50%–60%

Democratic primary results
Party	Candidate	Votes	%
Democratic	Vivian Miller (incumbent)	60,614	70.14
Democratic	Helen Hellon-Divers	25,789	29.84
Write-in		21	0.02
Total votes		86,424	100.00

=== Republican primary ===
==== Nominee ====
- Marcus Mitchell

==== Results ====
Republican primary results
Party	Candidate	Votes	%
Republican	Marcus Mitchell	12,721	99.95
Write-in		6	0.05
Total votes		12,727	100.00

=== General election ===
==== Results ====
2003 Philadelphia Clerk of Quarter Sessions election
Party	Candidate	Votes	%
Democratic	Vivian Miller (incumbent)	271,833	76.38
Republican	Marcus Mitchell	84,059	23.62
Write-in		14	0.00
Total votes		355,906	100.00
Democratic hold			

== Register of Wills ==
2003 Philadelphia register of wills election
- November 4, 2003

Candidate	Ronald Donatucci	Anita Zalewski
Party	Democratic	Republican
Popular vote	279,826	89,698
Percentage	75.72%	24.27%
- Donatucci: 50–60% 60–70% 70–80% 80–90% >90% Zalewski: 50–60% 60–70% 70–80%
Register of Wills before election
Ronald Donatucci
Democratic
Elected Register of Wills
Ronald Donatucci
Democratic

Incumbent Register Ronald Donatucci won reelection to a seventh term in a landslide.

=== Democratic primary ===
==== Nominee ====
- Ronald Donatucci, incumbent Register of Wills (1980–present)

==== Results ====
Democratic primary results
Party	Candidate	Votes	%
Democratic	Ronald Donatucci (incumbent)	80,661	99.97
Write-in		23	0.03
Total votes		80,684	100.00

=== Republican primary ===
==== Nominee ====
- Anita E. Zalewski

==== Results ====
Republican primary results
Party	Candidate	Votes	%
Republican	Anita E. Zalewski	13,484	99.95
Write-in		7	0.05
Total votes		13,491	100.00

=== General election ===
==== Results ====
2003 Philadelphia Register of Wills election
Party	Candidate	Votes	%
Democratic	Ronald Donatucci (incumbent)	279,826	75.72
Republican	Anita E. Zalewski	89,698	24.27
Write-in		16	0.00
Total votes		369,540	100.00
Democratic hold			

== Sheriff ==
2003 Philadelphia sheriff election
- November 4, 2003

Candidate	John Green	David Richards
Party	Democratic	Republican
Popular vote	280,249	91,837
Percentage	75.31%	24.68%
- Green: 50–60% 60–70% 70–80% 80–90% >90% Richards: 50–60% 60–70% 70–80% 80–90% Tie: 40–50% 50%
Sheriff before election
John Green
Democratic
Elected Sheriff
John Green
Democratic

Incumbent Sheriff John Green won reelection in a landslide to a fifth term in office.

=== Democratic primary ===
==== Nominee ====
- John Green, incumbent Sheriff (1988–present)

==== Results ====
Democratic primary results
Party	Candidate	Votes	%
Democratic	John Green (incumbent)	89,729	99.97
Write-in		28	0.03
Total votes		89,757	100.00

=== Republican primary ===
==== Nominee ====
- David H. Richards

==== Results ====
Republican primary results
Party	Candidate	Votes	%
Republican	David H. Richards	13,268	99.96
Write-in		5	0.04
Total votes		13,273	100.00

=== General election ===
==== Results ====
2003 Philadelphia Sheriff election
Party	Candidate	Votes	%
Democratic	John Green (incumbent)	280,249	75.31
Republican	David H. Richards	91,837	24.68
Write-in		26	0.01
Total votes		372,112	100.00
Democratic hold			

== Court of Common Pleas partisan election ==
=== Democratic primary ===
==== Results ====
Democratic primary results (vote for up to 11)
Party	Candidate	Votes	%
Democratic	Brenda Frazier-Clemons (Note: Cross-filed for the Republican nomination.)	46,956	6.68
Democratic	Leslie Fleisher	43,966	6.26
Democratic	Doris Pechkurow	40,874	5.82
Democratic	Joel Johnson Jr.	40,321	5.74
Democratic	Ramy Isaac Djerassi	38,235	5.44
Democratic	Lori A. Dumas	37,975	5.40
Democratic	Jeffrey P. Minehart	37,338	5.31
Democratic	Joseph A. Dych	37,016	5.27
Democratic	Paula Patrick	36,588	5.21
Democratic	Nina Wright Padilla	36,502	5.19
Democratic	Holly J. Ford	35,453	5.04
Democratic	Roger F. Gordon	34,634	4.93
Democratic	Glenn B. Bronson	33,680	4.79
Democratic	Ken Freeman	26,420	3.76
Democratic	Brad Moss	26,367	3.75
Democratic	Karen F. Zeitz	23,855	3.39
Democratic	Nazario Jimenez	22,068	3.14
Democratic	Ira B. Shrager	16,176	2.30
Democratic	Thomas Nocella	14,971	2.13
Democratic	John F. Raimondi	14,249	2.03
Democratic	Jimmie Moore	13,347	1.90
Democratic	Vivienne A. Crawford	11,743	1.67
Democratic	Jon Marshall	10,089	1.44
Democratic	Cateria R. McCabe	9,922	1.41
Democratic	Ronald G. McNeil	6,000	0.85
Democratic	Sonte A. Reavis	5,627	0.80
Democratic	Frank Palumbo	1,093	0.16
Democratic	Jim Divergilis	517	0.07
Democratic	Robert P. Coleman	448	0.06
Democratic	Walter J. Olszewski	317	0.05
Write-in		33	0.00
Total votes		702,780	100.00

=== Republican primary ===
==== Results ====
Republican primary results (vote for up to 11)
Party	Candidate	Votes	%
Republican	Leslie Fleisher (Note: Cross-filed for the Democratic nomination.)	10,909	11.17
Republican	Thomas Nocella	10,896	11.16
Republican	Joseph A. Dych	10,462	10.71
Republican	Jeffrey P. Minehart	10,359	10.61
Republican	Nina Wright Padilla	10,290	10.54
Republican	Nazario Jimenez	9,572	9.80
Republican	Brad Moss	7,517	7.70
Republican	Paula Patrick	7,138	7.31
Republican	Lori A. Dumas	6,884	7.05
Republican	Branda Frazier-Clemons	6,674	6.83
Republican	Glenn B. Bronson	6,609	6.77
Republican	Jim Divergilis	311	0.32
Write-in		24	0.02
Total votes		97,645	100.00

=== General election ===
==== Results ====
2003 Philadelphia Court of Common Pleas election (vote for up to 11)
Party	Candidate	Votes	%
Democratic	Lori A. Dumas	256,523	7.11
Republican	Lori A. Dumas	73,443	2.04
Total	Lori A. Dumas	329,966	9.14
Democratic	Nina Wright Padilla	255,303	7.07
Republican	Nina Wright Padilla	73,901	2.05
Total	Nina Wright Padilla	329,204	9.12
Democratic	Holly J. Ford	254,853	7.06
Republican	Holly J. Ford	73,473	2.04
Total	Holly J. Ford	328,326	9.10
Democratic	Brenda Frazier-Clemons	255,617	7.08
Republican	Brenda Frazier-Clemons	72,511	2.01
Total	Brenda Frazier-Clemons	328,128	9.09
Democratic	Paula Patrick	253,841	7.03
Republican	Paula Patrick	74,148	2.05
Total	Paula Patrick	327,989	9.09
Democratic	Jeffrey P. Minehart	251,938	6.98
Republican	Jeffrey P. Minehart	73,647	2.04
Total	Jeffrey P. Minehart	325,585	9.02
Democratic	Leslie Fleisher	251,762	6.98
Republican	Leslie Fleisher	73,506	2.04
Total	Leslie Fleisher	325,268	9.01
Democratic	Joseph A. Dych	249,962	6.93
Republican	Joseph A. Dych	72,639	2.01
Total	Joseph A. Dych	322,601	8.94
Democratic	Ramy Isaac Djerassi	247,870	6.87
Republican	Ramy Isaac Djerassi	71,601	1.98
Total	Ramy Isaac Djerassi	319,471	8.85
Democratic	Doris Pechkurow	252,799	7.01
Democratic	Joel Johnson Jr.	250,001	6.93
Republican	Thomas Nocella	84,905	2.35
Republican	Brad Moss	84,343	2.34
Write-in		88	0.00
Total votes		3,608,674	100.00

== Court of Common Pleas retention elections ==
=== Results ===
Justice Jacqueline F. Allen retention, 2003
Choice	Votes	%
For	111,784	81.13
Against	25,999	18.87
Total	137,783	100.00
Source: Philadelphia City Commissioners

Justice Genece E. Brinkley retention, 2003
Choice	Votes	%
For	102,318	75.42
Against	33,341	24.58
Total	135,659	100.00
Source: Philadelphia City Commissioners

Justice Tama Myers Clark retention, 2003
Choice	Votes	%
For	104,362	75.57
Against	33,737	24.43
Total	138,099	100.00
Source: Philadelphia City Commissioners

Justice Steven R. Geroff retention, 2003
Choice	Votes	%
For	106,479	79.92
Against	26,758	20.08
Total	133,237	100.00
Source: Philadelphia City Commissioners

Justice D. Webster Keogh retention, 2003
Choice	Votes	%
For	104,963	79.21
Against	27,550	20.79
Total	132,513	100.00
Source: Philadelphia City Commissioners

Justice William J. Manfredi retention, 2003
Choice	Votes	%
For	107,056	80.39
Against	26,114	19.61
Total	133,170	100.00
Source: Philadelphia City Commissioners

Justice Frederica A. Massiah-Jackson retention, 2003
Choice	Votes	%
For	107,696	77.20
Against	31,805	22.80
Total	139,501	100.00
Source: Philadelphia City Commissioners

Justice Rayford A. Means retention, 2003
Choice	Votes	%
For	106,235	79.24
Against	27,840	20.76
Total	134,075	100.00
Source: Philadelphia City Commissioners

Justice Sandra Mazer Moss retention, 2003
Choice	Votes	%
For	107,549	79.99
Against	26,899	20.01
Total	134,448	100.00
Source: Philadelphia City Commissioners

Justice Joseph D. O'Keefe retention, 2003
Choice	Votes	%
For	108,709	81.58
Against	24,545	18.42
Total	133,254	100.00
Source: Philadelphia City Commissioners

Justice Albert W. Sheppard Jr. retention, 2003
Choice	Votes	%
For	108,275	81.06
Against	25,304	18.94
Total	133,579	100.00
Source: Philadelphia City Commissioners

Justice Carolyn Temin retention, 2003
Choice	Votes	%
For	102,860	80.46
Against	24,974	19.54
Total	127,834	100.00
Source: Philadelphia City Commissioners

Justice Allan L. Tereshko retention, 2003
Choice	Votes	%
For	94,839	77.58
Against	27,408	22.42
Total	122,247	100.00
Source: Philadelphia City Commissioners

Justice Thomas Watkins retention, 2003
Choice	Votes	%
For	91,835	75.18
Against	30,320	24.82
Total	122,155	100.00
Source: Philadelphia City Commissioners

== Philadelphia Municipal Court partisan election ==
=== Democratic primary ===
==== Nominee ====
- Gerard A. Kosinski

=== Republican primary ===
==== Nominee ====
- Gerard A. Kosinski

=== General election ===
==== Results ====
2003 Philadelphia Municipal Court election (vote for up to 1)
Party	Candidate	Votes	%
Democratic	Gerard A. Kosinski	271,165	77.20
Republican	Gerard A. Kosinski	80,042	22.79
Write-in		27	0.01
Total votes		351,234	100.00

== Philadelphia Municipal Court retention elections ==
=== Results ===
Justice Robert S. Blasi retention, 2003
Choice	Votes	%
For	95,377	78.43
Against	26,226	21.57
Total	121,603	100.00
Source: Philadelphia City Commissioners

Justice Frank T. Brady retention, 2003
Choice	Votes	%
For	99,498	80.28
Against	24,436	19.72
Total	123,934	100.00
Source: Philadelphia City Commissioners

Justice Gwendolyn A. Conway retention, 2003
Choice	Votes	%
For	96,654	77.45
Against	28,148	22.55
Total	124,802	100.00
Source: Philadelphia City Commissioners

Justice Barbara S. Gilbert retention, 2003
Choice	Votes	%
For	99,520	80.55
Against	24,028	19.45
Total	123,548	100.00
Source: Philadelphia City Commissioners

Justice Lydia Y. Kirkland retention, 2003
Choice	Votes	%
For	100,185	79.94
Against	25,141	20.06
Total	125,326	100.00
Source: Philadelphia City Commissioners

Justice Marsha H. Neifield retention, 2003
Choice	Votes	%
For	97,258	79.14
Against	25,636	20.86
Total	122,894	100.00
Source: Philadelphia City Commissioners

Justice Craig M. Washington retention, 2003
Choice	Votes	%
For	96,764	78.02
Against	27,266	21.98
Total	124,030	100.00
Source: Philadelphia City Commissioners

== Philadelphia Traffic Court partisan election ==
=== Democratic primary ===
==== Results ====
Democratic primary results (vote for up to 1)
Party	Candidate	Votes	%
Democratic	Earlene Green Clark	50,110	53.15
Democratic	Michael McAleer	44,152	46.83
Write-in		17	0.02
Total votes		94,279	100.00

=== Republican primary ===
==== Results ====
Republican primary results (vote for up to 1)
Party	Candidate	Votes	%
Republican	Michael McAleer	13,559	99.94
Write-in		8	0.06
Total votes		13,567	100.00

=== General election ===
==== Results ====
2003 Philadelphia Traffic Court election (vote for up to 1)
Party	Candidate	Votes	%
Democratic	Earlene Green Clark	261,689	73.54
Republican	Michael McAleer	94,135	26.45
Write-in		18	0.01
Total votes		355,842	100.00

== Philadelphia Traffic Court retention elections ==
=== Results ===
Justice Bernice Ann DeAngelis retention, 2003
Choice	Votes	%
For	98,779	78.66
Against	26,806	21.34
Total	125,585	100.00
Source: Philadelphia City Commissioners

Justice Joseph A. Howlett retention, 2003
Choice	Votes	%
For	97,079	77.70
Against	27,865	22.30
Total	124,944	100.00
Source: Philadelphia City Commissioners

Justice Francis E. Kelly retention, 2003
Choice	Votes	%
For	102,084	80.21
Against	25,189	19.79
Total	127,273	100.00
Source: Philadelphia City Commissioners

Justice Fortunato N. Perry Sr. retention, 2003
Choice	Votes	%
For	99,129	77.36
Against	29,004	22.64
Total	128,133	100.00
Source: Philadelphia City Commissioners

== Ballot questions ==
One ballot question appeared on the primary ballot and nine questions appeared on the general ballot, two of which were statewide measures. All questions passed.

=== Primary ballot ===
Authorize $82.975 million in bonds for capital projects
Choice	Votes	%
For	50,395	70.14
Against	21,457	29.86
Total	71,852	100.00
Source: Philadelphia City Commissioners

=== General ballot ===
Proposed Charter Change 1: Require City Contracts be Audited by the City Auditing Department
Choice	Votes	%
For	154,041	74.71
Against	52,141	25.29
Total	206,182	100.00
Source: Philadelphia City Commissioners

Proposed Charter Change 2: Provide for a Non-voting Member of the Board of Pensions and Retirement
Choice	Votes	%
For	122,314	61.03
Against	78,091	38.97
Total	200,405	100.00
Source: Philadelphia City Commissioners

Proposed Charter Change 3: Preference for Philadelphia-based Firms in City Contract Bids
Choice	Votes	%
For	146,354	71.96
Against	57,020	28.04
Total	203,374	100.00
Source: Philadelphia City Commissioners

Proposed Charter Change 4: Exempt Contracts with expenditures of $25,000 or less from the Open Bid Procedure
Choice	Votes	%
For	106,903	55.34
Against	86,286	44.66
Total	193,189	100.00
Source: Philadelphia City Commissioners

Proposed Charter Change 5: City Health Department shall prepare a Universal Health Care Plan
Choice	Votes	%
For	149,558	75.04
Against	49,754	24.96
Total	199,312	100.00
Source: Philadelphia City Commissioners

Proposed Charter Change 6: Create an Insurance Public Advocate position
Choice	Votes	%
For	160,546	80.58
Against	38,683	19.42
Total	199,229	100.00
Source: Philadelphia City Commissioners

Proposed Charter Change 7: Provide for use of Cooperative Purchasing Agreements with other Public Agencies
Choice	Votes	%
For	141,057	74.86
Against	47,362	25.14
Total	188,419	100.00
Source: Philadelphia City Commissioners
