= 2019 Philadelphia municipal election =

2019 Pennsylvania local election

2019 Philadelphia elections
- November 5, 2019

A general election was held in Philadelphia, Pennsylvania on November 5, 2019, to elect various county and city-level positions. The primary election was held on May 21, 2019.

== Mayor ==
=== Results ===
2019 Philadelphia mayoral election
Party	Candidate	Votes	%
Democratic	Jim Kenney (incumbent)	234,749	80.33
Republican	Billy Ciancaglini	56,710	19.41
Write-in		780	0.27
Total votes		292,239	100.00
Democratic hold			

== City Commissioners ==
=== Democratic primary ===
==== Results ====
2019 Philadelphia City Commissioners Democratic primary (vote for up to 2)
Party	Candidate	Votes	%
Democratic	Omar Sabir	71,303	24.33
Democratic	Lisa Deeley (incumbent)	61,278	20.91
Democratic	Kahlil Williams	48,884	16.68
Democratic	Jen Devor	23,752	8.11
Democratic	Marwan Kreidie	23,190	7.91
Democratic	Annette Thompson	14,389	4.91
Democratic	Dennis Lee	11,649	3.98
Democratic	Luigi Borda	11,352	3.87
Democratic	Carla Cain	9,613	3.28
Democratic	Moira Bohannon	5,054	1.72
Democratic	Robin Trent	4,949	1.69
Democratic	Warren Bloom	3,808	1.30
Democratic	Lewis Harris Jr.	3,793	1.29
Write-in		34	0.01
Total votes		293,048	100.00

=== Republican primary ===
==== Results ====
2019 Philadelphia City Commissioners Republican primary (vote for up to 2)
Party	Candidate	Votes	%
Republican	Al Schmidt (incumbent)	16,782	99.72
Write-in		47	0.28
Total votes		16,829	100.00

=== General election ===
==== Results ====
2019 Philadelphia City Commissioners election (vote for up to 2)
Party	Candidate	Votes	%
Democratic	Lisa Deeley (incumbent)	222,203	45.06
Democratic	Omar Sabir	216,542	43.92
Republican	Al Schmidt (incumbent)	53,776	10.91
Write-in		564	0.11
Total votes		493,085	100.00

== Register of Wills ==
2019 Philadelphia register of wills election
- November 5, 2019
Candidate	Tracey Gordon
Party	Democratic
Popular vote	234,401
Percentage	99.86%
Register of Wills before election
Ronald Donatucci
Democratic
Elected Register of Wills
Tracey Gordon
Democratic

Tracey Gordon, who defeated 40-year incumbent Ronald Donatucci in the Democratic primary, ran unopposed in the general election.

=== Democratic primary ===
Incumbent Ronald Donatucci, who had held the office since 1980 and was the longest-serving office-holder in Philadelphia, lost the primary in a tight contest to Tracey Gordon.

==== Nominated ====
- Tracey Gordon, community organizer and perennial candidate

==== Eliminated in primary ====
- Ronald Donatucci, incumbent register of wills (1980–present)
- Jacque Whaumbush, former chief sheriff's deputy

==== Results ====
Results by ward Gordon: 40–50%; 50–60%; 60–70%; Donatucci: 30–40%; 40–50%; 50–60%; 70–80%

2019 Philadelphia register of wills Democratic primary
Party	Candidate	Votes	%
Democratic	Tracey Gordon	72,175	44.17
Democratic	Ronald Donatucci (incumbent)	65,198	39.90
Democratic	Jacque Whaumbush	25,985	15.90
Write-in		40	0.02
Total votes		163,398	100.00

=== Republican primary ===
==== Results ====
2019 Philadelphia register of wills Republican primary
Party	Candidate	Votes	%
	Write-in	64	100.00
Total votes		64	100.00

=== General election ===
==== Results ====
2019 Philadelphia register of wills election
Party	Candidate	Votes	%
Democratic	Tracey Gordon	234,401	99.86
Write-in		317	0.14
Total votes		234,718	100.00
Democratic hold			

== Sheriff ==
2019 Philadelphia sheriff election
- November 5, 2019
Candidate	Rochelle Bilal
Party	Democratic
Popular vote	233,105
Percentage	99.79%
Sheriff before election
Jewell Williams
Democratic
Elected Sheriff
Rochelle Bilal
Democratic

Rochelle Bilal, who defeated incumbent Jewell Williams in the Democratic primary, ran unopposed in the general election.

=== Democratic primary ===
Incumbent Jewell Williams, who had held the office since 2012, lost the primary to Rochelle Bilal.

==== Nominee ====
- Rochelle Bilal, former police officer and president of the Guardian Civic League

==== Eliminated in primary ====
- Larry King Sr., former sheriff's deputy
- Malika Rahman, former corrections officer and sheriff's deputy
- Jewell Williams, incumbent sheriff (2012–present)

==== Results ====
Results by ward Bilal: 30–40%; 40–50%; 50–60%; 60–70%; Williams: 30–40%; 40–50%; 50–60%; Rahman: 50–60%

2019 Philadelphia sheriff Democratic primary
Party	Candidate	Votes	%
Democratic	Rochelle Bilal	67,810	41.07
Democratic	Jewell Williams (incumbent)	45,088	27.31
Democratic	Malika Rahman	42,010	25.44
Democratic	Larry King Sr.	10,168	6.16
Write-in		45	0.03
Total votes		165,121	100.00

=== Republican primary ===
==== Results ====
2019 Philadelphia sheriff Republican primary
Party	Candidate	Votes	%
	Write-in	84	100.00
Total votes		84	100.00

=== General election ===
==== Results ====
2019 Philadelphia sheriff election
Party	Candidate	Votes	%
Democratic	Rochelle Bilal	233,105	99.79
Write-in		483	0.21
Total votes		233,588	100.00
Democratic hold			

== Court of Common Pleas partisan election ==
Incumbent Judge Sandy L. V. Byrd filed to run for retention but later withdrew, resulting in six seats up in the primary election and seven seats up in the general election.

=== Democratic primary ===
==== Results ====
2019 Philadelphia Court of Common Pleas Democratic primary (vote for up to 6)
Party	Candidate	Votes	%
Democratic	Jennifer Schultz	59,547	8.14
Democratic	Anthony Kyriakakis	58,128	7.94
Democratic	Joshua Roberts	55,702	7.61
Democratic	Tiffany Palmer	55,586	7.60
Democratic	James C. Crumlish	39,217	5.36
Democratic	Carmella Jacquinto	38,920	5.32
Democratic	Wendi Barish	36,998	5.06
Democratic	Cateria R. McCabe	36,214	4.95
Democratic	Kay Yu	34,475	4.71
Democratic	Henry McGregor Sias	33,560	4.59
Democratic	Craig Levin	30,746	4.20
Democratic	Nicola Serianni	28,328	3.87
Democratic	Leon Goodman	26,352	3.60
Democratic	Chris Hall	23,891	3.27
Democratic	Beth Grossman	23,876	3.26
Democratic	Kendra McCrae	21,853	2.99
Democratic	Sherman Toppin	19,331	2.64
Democratic	Jon Marshall	19,322	2.64
Democratic	Terri M. Booker	18,750	2.56
Democratic	Vicki Markovitz	16,433	2.25
Democratic	Laurie Dow	16,020	2.19
Democratic	Janine D. Momasso	14,384	1.97
Democratic	James F. Berardinelli	13,663	1.87
Democratic	Robert Trimble	6,305	0.86
Democratic	Gregory Weyer	3,962	0.54
Write-in		108	0.01
Total votes		731,671	100.00

=== Republican primary ===
==== Results ====
2019 Philadelphia Court of Common Pleas Republican primary (vote for up to 6)
Party	Candidate	Votes	%
Republican	Beth Grossman	15,905	99.34
Write-in		105	0.66
Total votes		16,010	100.00

=== General election ===
2019 Philadelphia Court of Common Pleas election (vote for up to 7)
Party	Candidate	Votes	%
Democratic	Tiffany Palmer	225,978	15.00
Democratic	Jennifer Schultz	219,027	14.54
Democratic	Anthony Kyriakakis	217,169	14.42
Democratic	James C. Crumlish	213,568	14.18
Democratic	Carmella Jacquinto	213,131	14.15
Democratic	Joshua Roberts	210,335	13.97
Democratic	Crystal B. Powell	206,091	13.68
Write-in		779	0.05
Total votes		1,506,078	100.00

== Court of Common Pleas retention elections ==
=== Results ===
Justice Daniel Anders retention, 2019
Choice	Votes	%
For	131,371	76.36
Against	40,669	23.64
Total	172,040	100.00
Source: Philadelphia City Commissioners

Justice Ida Chen retention, 2019
Choice	Votes	%
For	133,204	77.61
Against	38,434	22.39
Total	171,638	100.00
Source: Philadelphia City Commissioners

Justice Robert P. Coleman retention, 2019
Choice	Votes	%
For	126,455	75.60
Against	40,818	24.40
Total	167,273	100.00
Source: Philadelphia City Commissioners

Justice Roxanne E. Covington retention, 2019
Choice	Votes	%
For	133,306	78.91
Against	35,624	21.09
Total	168,930	100.00
Source: Philadelphia City Commissioners

Justice Richard J. Gordon retention, 2019
Choice	Votes	%
For	126,454	76.79
Against	38,212	23.21
Total	164,666	100.00
Source: Philadelphia City Commissioners

Justice Glynnis D. Hill retention, 2019
Choice	Votes	%
For	124,899	76.58
Against	38,202	23.42
Total	163,101	100.00
Source: Philadelphia City Commissioners

Justice Karen Shreeves-Johns retention, 2019
Choice	Votes	%
For	134,231	79.14
Against	35,390	20.86
Total	169,621	100.00
Source: Philadelphia City Commissioners

Justice Diane R. Thompson retention, 2019
Choice	Votes	%
For	132,355	79.69
Against	33,739	20.31
Total	166,094	100.00
Source: Philadelphia City Commissioners

Justice Donna M. Woelpper retention, 2019
Choice	Votes	%
For	126,240	77.51
Against	36,633	22.49
Total	162,873	100.00
Source: Philadelphia City Commissioners

Justice Sheila Woods-Skipper retention, 2019
Choice	Votes	%
For	135,565	79.82
Against	34,279	20.18
Total	169,844	100.00
Source: Philadelphia City Commissioners

== Philadelphia Municipal Court partisan election ==
=== Democratic primary ===
==== Results ====
2019 Philadelphia Municipal Court Democratic primary (vote for up to 1)
Party	Candidate	Votes	%
Democratic	David H. Conroy	84,209	55.47
Democratic	Theresa Brunson	67,540	44.49
Write-in		48	0.03
Total votes		151,797	100.00

=== Republican primary ===
==== Results ====
2019 Philadelphia Municipal Court Republican primary (vote for up to 1)
Party	Candidate	Votes	%
	Write-in	49	100.00
Total votes		49	100.00

=== General election ===
==== Results ====
2019 Philadelphia Municipal Court election (vote for up to 1)
Party	Candidate	Votes	%
Democratic	David H. Conroy	231,734	99.92
Write-in		180	0.08
Total votes		231,914	100.00

== Philadelphia Municipal Court retention elections ==
=== Results ===
Justice Martin S. Coleman retention, 2019
Choice	Votes	%
For	133,603	76.92
Against	40,087	23.08
Total	173,690	100.00
Source: Philadelphia City Commissioners

Justice Jacquelyn Frazier-Lyde retention, 2019
Choice	Votes	%
For	141,099	79.40
Against	36,612	20.60
Total	177,711	100.00
Source: Philadelphia City Commissioners

Justice Henry Lewandowski retention, 2019
Choice	Votes	%
For	124,181	74.55
Against	42,398	25.45
Total	166,579	100.00
Source: Philadelphia City Commissioners

Justice Wendy Lynn Pew retention, 2019
Choice	Votes	%
For	132,062	77.68
Against	37,951	22.32
Total	170,013	100.00
Source: Philadelphia City Commissioners

Justice T. Francis Shields retention, 2019
Choice	Votes	%
For	129,085	77.66
Against	37,142	22.34
Total	166,227	100.00
Source: Philadelphia City Commissioners

== Ballot questions ==
Four ballot questions appeared on the primary ballot and two questions appeared on the general ballot. All proposals passed.

=== Primary election ===
Proposal 1 results by ward Yes: 50%–60%; 60%–70%; 70%–80%; 80%–90%; No: 50%–60%; 60%–70%

Proposed Charter Change 1: Gender-Neutral References for City Council Positions
Choice	Votes	%
For	117,107	67.89
Against	55,388	32.11
Total	172,495	100.00
Source: Philadelphia City Commissioners

Proposal 2 results by ward Yes: 50%–60%; 60%–70%; 70%–80%; 80%–90%; No: 50%–60%; 60%–70%

Proposed Charter Change 2: Create the Office of Immigrant Affairs
Choice	Votes	%
For	125,479	73.94
Against	44,232	26.06
Total	169,711	100.00
Source: Philadelphia City Commissioners

Proposal 3 results by ward Yes: 50%–60%; 60%–70%; 70%–80%; 80%–90%; 90%–100%; No: 50%–60%

Proposed Charter Change 3: Call on State Legislature to Increase Minimum Wage to US$15 by 2025
Choice	Votes	%
For	141,108	81.71
Against	31,589	18.29
Total	172,697	100.00
Source: Philadelphia City Commissioners

Proposal 4 results by ward Yes: 50%–60%; 60%–70%; 70%–80%; 80%–90%; No: 50%–60%; 60%–70%

Proposed Charter Change 4: Create Public Safety Enforcement Officers to Assist Police in Regulating Traffic Codes
Choice	Votes	%
For	117,287	69.08
Against	52,495	30.92
Total	169,782	100.00
Source: Philadelphia City Commissioners

=== General election ===
Proposal 1 results by ward Yes: 50%–60%; 60%–70%; 70%–80%; 80%–90%

Proposed Charter Change: Raise the Threshold for Competitive Bidding from US$34,000
Choice	Votes	%
For	179,347	71.79
Against	70,464	28.21
Total	249,811	100.00
Source: Philadelphia City Commissioners

Bond proposal results by ward Yes: 50%–60%; 60%–70%; 70%–80%; 80%–90%; No: 50%–60%

Authorize the city to issue US$185 million in bonds to fund various development projects
Choice	Votes	%
For	189,682	71.39
Against	76,013	28.61
Total	265,695	100.00
Source: Philadelphia City Commissioners
