= 2023 Philadelphia municipal election =

2023 Pennsylvania local election

2023 Philadelphia elections
- November 7, 2023

A general election was held in Philadelphia, Pennsylvania on November 7, 2023, to elect various county and city-level positions. The primary election was held on May 16, 2023.

== Mayor ==
=== Results ===
2023 Philadelphia mayoral election
Party	Candidate	Votes	%
Democratic	Cherelle Parker	232,075	74.72
Republican	David Oh	75,677	24.36
Write-in		2,849	0.92
Total votes		310,601	100.00
Democratic hold			

== City Commissioners ==
=== Democratic primary ===
==== Results ====
2023 Philadelphia City Commissioners Democratic primary (vote for up to 2)
Party	Candidate	Votes	%
Democratic	Omar Sabir (incumbent)	147,436	51.08
Democratic	Lisa Deeley (incumbent)	140,326	48.62
Write-in		849	0.29
Total votes		288,611	100.00

=== Republican primary ===
==== Results ====
2023 Philadelphia City Commissioners Republican primary (vote for up to 2)
Party	Candidate	Votes	%
Republican	Seth Bluestein (incumbent)	13,645	98.57
Write-in		198	1.43
Total votes		13,843	100.00

=== General election ===
==== Results ====
2023 Philadelphia City Commissioners election (vote for up to 2)
Party	Candidate	Votes	%
Democratic	Lisa Deeley (incumbent)	209,374	44.06
Democratic	Omar Sabir (incumbent)	204,260	42.99
Republican	Seth Bluestein (incumbent)	60,850	12.81
Write-in		704	0.15
Total votes		475,188	100.00

== City Controller special election ==
2023 Philadelphia city controller election
- November 7, 2023

Candidate	Christy Brady	Aaron Bashir
Party	Democratic	Republican
Popular vote	225,917	52,603
Percentage	81.03%	18.87%
- Brady: 50–60% 60–70% 70–80% 80–90% >90% Bashir: 50–60% 60–70% 70–80% Tie: 50%
City Controller before election
Christy Brady
Democratic
Elected City Controller
Christy Brady
Democratic

A special election took place after the resignation of City Controller Rebecca Rhynhart in October 2022 to run for mayor.

=== Democratic primary ===
==== Nominee ====
- Christy Brady, Acting City Controller (2022–present)

==== Eliminated in primary ====
- Alexandra Hunt, activist, public health researcher, and candidate for Pennsylvania's 3rd congressional district in 2022
- John Thomas, management consultan

==== Did not file ====
- Karen Javaruski, enterprise risk management professional

==== Withdrawn ====
- Jack Inacker, United States Air Force veteran and former nuclear weapons systems specialist (endorsed Brady)
- Gregg Kravitz, realtor

==== Endorsements ====
Christy Brady

U.S. Representatives

- Brendan Boyle PA-2 (2015–present)
- Bob Brady, PA-1 (1998–2019) and Chair of the Philadelphia Democratic Party (1986–present)
- Dwight Evans, PA-3 (2016–present)

State senators

- Sharif Street, District 3 (2017–present) and Pennsylvania Democratic Party chair (2022–present)
- Tina Tartaglione, 2nd district (1995–present)

State representatives

- Kevin Boyle, District 172 (2011–present)
- Danilo Burgos, District 197 (2019–present)
- Jose Giral, District 180 (2023–present)
- Ed Neilson, District 174 (2015–present) and District 169 (2012–2014)

Philadelphia city councilmembers

- Jannie Blackwell, 3rd district (1992–2020) and First Vice Chair of the Philadelphia Democratic Party
- Jim Harrity, at-large (2022–present)
- Kenyatta Johnson, 2nd district (2012–present) and former Pennsylvania state representative from District 186 (2009–2012)

Local officials

- Alan Butkovitz, former Philadelphia City Controller (2006–2018)
- Lisa Deeley, Chair (2017–present) of the Philadelphia City Commissioners (2016–present)
- Omar Sabir, Vice Chair of the Philadelphia City Commissioners (2020–present)
- Jonathan Saidel, former Philadelphia City Controller (1990–2006) and 2010 runner-up for Lieutenant Governor of Pennsylvania

Individuals

- Jack Inacker, United States Air Force veteran and former 2023 Philadelphia City Controller candidate

Labor unions

- American Federation of State, County and Municipal Employees District Councils 33 and 47
- American Federation of Teachers Local 2026 (Community College of Philadelphia Chapter)
- Eastern Atlantic States Regional Council of Carpenters
- International Alliance of Theatrical Stage Employees Local 8
- Philadelphia Building Trades Council
- Philadelphia Council AFL-CIO
- Sprinkler Fitters Local 692
- Transport Workers Union of America - Local 234

Newspapers and other media

- Philadelphia Gay News

Organizations

- Liberty City LGBTQ Democratic Club
- Philadelphia Young Democrats

Political parties

- Philadelphia Democratic Party
Alexandra Hunt

Organizations

- Philadelphia Neighborhood Networks
- Progressive Victory
Gregg Kavitz (withdrawn)

Organizations

- LGBTQ Victory Fund
John Thomas

State representatives

- Stephen Kinsey, 201st district (2013–present)

Philadelphia city councilors

- Marian Tasco, 9th district (1988–2016)

Labor unions

- Laborers' International Union of North America District Council of Philadelphia

Newspapers and other media

- The Philadelphia Inquirer
- The Philadelphia Tribune

==== Results ====
Primary results by ward Brady: 30%–40%; 40%–50%; 50%–60%; 60%–70%; Hunt: 30%–40%; 40%–50%; Thomas: 40%–50%

Democratic primary results
Party	Candidate	Votes	%
Democratic	Christy Brady	86,884	46.11
Democratic	Alexandra Hunt	59,068	31.35
Democratic	John Thomas	42,292	22.45
Write-in		170	0.09
Total votes		188,414	100.00

=== Republican primary ===
==== Candidates ====
===== Nominee =====
- Aaron Bashir, entrepreneur and nominee for Pennsylvania's 2nd congressional district in 2022

==== Results ====
Republican primary
Party	Candidate	Votes	%
Republican	Aaron Bashir	13,545	99.11
Write-in		121	0.89
Total votes		13,666	100.00

=== General election ===
==== Results ====
2023 Philadelphia City Controller special election
Party	Candidate	Votes	%
Democratic	Christy Brady	225,917	81.03
Republican	Aaron Bashir	52,603	18.87
Write-in		297	0.11
Total votes		278,817	100.00
Democratic hold			

== Register of Wills ==
2023 Philadelphia register of wills election
- November 7, 2023

Candidate	John Sabatina	Linwood Holland
Party	Democratic	Republican
Popular vote	225,156	47,187
Percentage	82.41%	17.27%
- Sabatina: 50–60% 60–70% 70–80% 80–90% >90% Holland: 50–60% 60–70% Tie: 50%
Register of Wills before election
Tracey Gordon
Democratic
Elected Register of Wills
John Sabatina
Democratic

=== Democratic primary ===
Incumbent Register of Wills Tracey Gordon was defeated by John Sabatina.

==== Nominee ====
- John Sabatina, former estate attorney and 56th Ward Democratic Party leader

==== Eliminated in primary ====
- Elizabeth Hall Lowe, compliance solutions lead at GlaxoSmithKline
- Rae K. Hall, mayoral Chief of Staff office member and former staff member of City Councilmember Anna Verna
- Tracey Gordon, incumbent Register of Wills (2020–present)

==== Results ====
Primary results by ward Sabatina: 20%–30%; 30%–40%; 40%–50%; 50%–60%; 60%–70%; 70%–80%; Gordon: 30%–40%; 40%–50%; 50%–60%; Hall Lowe: 30%–40%

2023 Philadelphia Register of Wills Democratic primary
Party	Candidate	Votes	%
Democratic	John Sabatina	58,310	32.21
Democratic	Tracey L. Gordon (incumbent)	55,123	30.45
Democratic	Elizabeth Hall Lowe	40,428	22.33
Democratic	Rae K. Hall	27,012	14.92
Write-in		165	0.09
Total votes		181,038	100.00

=== Republican primary ===
==== Nominee ====
- Linwood Holland, 35th Ward Republican Party leader

==== Results ====
2023 Philadelphia Register of Wills Republican primary
Party	Candidate	Votes	%
Republican	Linwood Holland	13,296	99.05
Write-in		128	0.95
Total votes		13,424	100.00

=== General election ===
==== Candidates ====
- Linwood Holland, 35th Ward Republican Party leader
- John Sabatina, former estate attorney and 56th Ward Democratic Party leader

==== Results ====
2023 Philadelphia Register of Wills election
Party	Candidate	Votes	%
Democratic	John Sabatina	225,156	82.41
Republican	Linwood Holland	47,187	17.27
Write-in		886	0.32
Total votes		273,229	100.00
Democratic hold			

== Sheriff ==
2023 Philadelphia sheriff election
- November 7, 2023

Candidate	Rochelle Bilal	Mark LaVelle
Party	Democratic	Republican
Popular vote	199,406	69,512
Percentage	73.72%	25.70%
- Bilal: 50–60% 60–70% 70–80% 80–90% >90% LaVelle: 50–60% 60–70% 70–80% 80–90% Tie: 50%
Sheriff before election
Rochelle Bilal
Democratic
Elected Sheriff
Rochelle Bilal
Democratic

=== Democratic primary ===
==== Nominee ====
- Rochelle Bilal, incumbent sheriff (2020–present)

==== Eliminated in primary ====
- Jackie L. Miles, Washington Wizards director of security, former deputy sheriff, and US Marine veteran
- Michael Untermeyer, attorney and real estate investor

==== Results ====
Primary results by ward Bilal: 30%–40%; 40%–50%; 50%–60%; 60%–70%; Untermeyer: 40%–50%; 50%–60%; 60%–70%

2023 Philadelphia Sheriff Democratic primary
Party	Candidate	Votes	%
Democratic	Rochelle Bilal (incumbent)	78,444	43.50
Democratic	Michael Untermeyer	72,963	40.46
Democratic	Jackie L. Miles	27,865	15.45
Write-in		1,054	0.58
Total votes		180,326	100.00

=== Republican primary ===
==== Nominee ====
- Mark LaVelle, warehouse manager and candidate for the 2022 Pennsylvania House of Representatives election

==== Results ====
2023 Philadelphia Sheriff Republican primary
Party	Candidate	Votes	%
Republican	Mark LaVelle	13,763	98.94
Write-in		148	1.06
Total votes		13,911	100.00

=== General election ===
==== Results ====
2023 Philadelphia Sheriff election
Party	Candidate	Votes	%
Democratic	Rochelle Bilal (incumbent)	199,406	73.72
Republican	Mark LaVelle	69,512	25.70
Write-in		1,587	0.59
Total votes		270,505	100.00
Democratic hold			

== Court of Common Pleas partisan election ==
=== Democratic primary ===
==== Results ====
2023 Philadelphia Court of Common Pleas Democratic primary (vote for up to 10)
Party	Candidate	Votes	%
Democratic	Natasha Taylor-Smith	145,242	10.29
Democratic	Tamika Washington	130,896	9.27
Democratic	Samantha Williams	121,340	8.60
Democratic	Kay Yu	109,961	7.79
Democratic	John Padova	100,946	7.15
Democratic	Chesley Lightsey	91,646	6.49
Democratic	Brian McLaughlin	87,367	6.19
Democratic	Damaris Garcia	86,824	6.15
Democratic	Caroline Turner	86,095	6.10
Democratic	Jessica R. Brown	81,517	5.78
Democratic	Will Braveman	78,447	5.56
Democratic	Wade D. Albert	78,124	5.54
Democratic	Kenneth Joel	69,900	4.95
Democratic	Qawi Abdul-Rahman	54,810	3.88
Democratic	Melissa Francis	48,868	3.46
Democratic	Joe Green	38,524	2.73
Write-in		865	0.06
Total votes		1,411,372	100.00

=== Republican primary ===
==== Results ====
2023 Philadelphia Court of Common Pleas Republican primary (vote for up to 10)
Party	Candidate	Votes	%
	Write-in	1,353	100.00
Total votes		1,353	100.00

=== General election ===
==== Results ====
2023 Philadelphia Court of Common Pleas election (vote for up to 13)
Party	Candidate	Votes	%
Democratic	Tamika Washington	204,468	9.45
Democratic	Natasha Taylor-Smith	201,305	9.30
Democratic	Samantha Williams	190,770	8.82
Democratic	Kay Yu	184,706	8.54
Democratic	John Padova	181,310	8.38
Democratic	Brian McLaughlin	181,161	8.37
Democratic	Chesley Lightsey	175,248	8.10
Democratic	Jessica R. Brown	155,170	7.17
Democratic	Caroline Turner	152,850	7.06
Democratic	Damaris Garcia	141,108	6.52
Democratic	James J. Eisenhower	138,927	6.42
Democratic	Elvin Ross	128,519	5.94
Democratic	Raj Sandher	124,315	5.75
Write-in		3,961	0.18
Total votes		2,163,818	100.00

== Court of Common Pleas retention elections ==
=== Results ===
Justice Jacqueline F. Allen retention, 2023
Choice	Votes	%
For	168,514	78.63
Against	45,807	21.37
Total	214,321	100.00
Source: Philadelphia City Commissioners

Justice Giovanni O. Campbell retention, 2023
Choice	Votes	%
For	153,143	75.20
Against	50,498	24.80
Total	203,641	100.00
Source: Philadelphia City Commissioners

Justice Anne Marie B. Coyle retention, 2023
Choice	Votes	%
For	125,964	58.31
Against	90,072	41.69
Total	216,036	100.00
Source: Philadelphia City Commissioners

Justice Ramy I. Djerassi retention, 2023
Choice	Votes	%
For	135,373	69.29
Against	60,002	30.71
Total	195,375	100.00
Source: Philadelphia City Commissioners

Justice Joe Fernandes retention, 2023
Choice	Votes	%
For	144,481	74.03
Against	50,690	25.97
Total	195,171	100.00
Source: Philadelphia City Commissioners

Justice Holly J. Ford retention, 2023
Choice	Votes	%
For	144,729	74.34
Against	49,952	25.66
Total	194,681	100.00
Source: Philadelphia City Commissioners

Justice Timika Lane retention, 2023
Choice	Votes	%
For	186,747	82.11
Against	40,693	17.89
Total	227,440	100.00
Source: Philadelphia City Commissioners

Justice J. Scott O'Keefe retention, 2023
Choice	Votes	%
For	145,119	74.31
Against	50,162	25.69
Total	195,281	100.00
Source: Philadelphia City Commissioners

Justice Paula A. Patrick retention, 2023
Choice	Votes	%
For	132,708	64.89
Against	71,810	35.11
Total	204,518	100.00
Source: Philadelphia City Commissioners

Justice Sierra Thomas Street retention, 2023
Choice	Votes	%
For	158,002	77.01
Against	47,168	22.99
Total	205,170	100.00
Source: Philadelphia City Commissioners

Justice Nina Wright Padilla retention, 2023
Choice	Votes	%
For	155,788	78.03
Against	43,854	21.97
Total	199,642	100.00
Source: Philadelphia City Commissioners

== Philadelphia Municipal Court partisan election ==
=== Democratic primary ===
==== Results ====
2023 Philadelphia Municipal Court Democratic primary (vote for up to 2)
Party	Candidate	Votes	%
Democratic	Barbara Thomson	126,504	41.40
Democratic	Colleen McIntyre Osborne	88,841	29.08
Democratic	Melissa Francis	46,476	15.21
Democratic	Rania Major	43,218	14.14
Write-in		511	0.17
Total votes		305,550	100.00

=== Republican primary ===
==== Results ====
2023 Philadelphia Municipal Court Republican primary (vote for up to 2)
Party	Candidate	Votes	%
Republican	Rania M. Major	10,429	97.86
Write-in		228	2.14
Total votes		10,657	100.00

=== General election ===
==== Results ====
2023 Philadelphia Municipal Court election (vote for up to 2)
Party	Candidate	Votes	%
Democratic	Barbara Thomson	208,221	50.09
Democratic	Colleen McIntyre Osborne	162,250	39.03
Republican	Rania M. Major	44,774	10.77
Write-in		420	0.10
Total votes		415,665	100.00

== Philadelphia Municipal Court retention elections ==
=== Results ===
Justice Marissa Brumbach retention, 2023
Choice	Votes	%
For	150,415	72.37
Against	57,414	27.63
Total	207,829	100.00
Source: Philadelphia City Commissioners

Justice William A. Meehan Jr. retention, 2023
Choice	Votes	%
For	143,233	68.42
Against	66,098	31.58
Total	209,331	100.00
Source: Philadelphia City Commissioners

Justice Brad Moss retention, 2023
Choice	Votes	%
For	138,196	68.45
Against	63,699	31.55
Total	201,895	100.00
Source: Philadelphia City Commissioners

Justice David C. Shuter retention, 2023
Choice	Votes	%
For	126,839	63.15
Against	74,012	36.85
Total	200,851	100.00
Source: Philadelphia City Commissioners

Justice Karen Yvette Simmons retention, 2023
Choice	Votes	%
For	160,475	77.98
Against	45,305	22.02
Total	205,780	100.00
Source: Philadelphia City Commissioners

Justice Marvin L. Williams retention, 2023
Choice	Votes	%
For	151,460	75.93
Against	48,016	24.07
Total	199,476	100.00
Source: Philadelphia City Commissioners

Justice Matt Wolf retention, 2023
Choice	Votes	%
For	164,974	78.67
Against	44,732	21.33
Total	209,706	100.00
Source: Philadelphia City Commissioners

== Ballot questions ==
Four ballot questions appeared on the primary ballot and one question appeared on the general ballot. All except one proposal passed.

=== Primary election ===
Proposal 1 results by ward Yes: 50%–60%; 60%–70%; 70%–80%; No: 50%–60%

Proposed Charter Change 1: Create the Division of Workforce Solutions within the Department of Commerce
Choice	Votes	%
For	174,950	67.32
Against	84,912	32.68
Total	259,862	100.00
Source: Philadelphia City Commissioners

Proposal 2 results by ward Yes: 50%–60%; 60%–70%; 70%–80%; 80%–90%; No: 50%–60%

Proposed Charter Change 2: Expand requirements for annual minimum appropriations to the Budget Stabilization Reserve
Choice	Votes	%
For	167,317	64.72
Against	91,214	35.28
Total	258,531	100.00
Source: Philadelphia City Commissioners

Proposal 3 results by ward No: 50%–60%; 60%–70%; 70%–80%; Yes: 50%–60%; 60%–70%

Proposed Charter Change 3: Allow employees of the Citizens Police Oversight Commission to be exempt from civil service hiring requirements
Choice	Votes	%
For	121,276	46.85
Against	137,578	53.15
Total	258,854	100.00
Source: Philadelphia City Commissioners

Proposal 4 results by ward Yes: 50%–60%; 60%–70%; 70%–80%; No: 50%–60%; 60%–70%

Proposed Charter Change 4: Create the Office of Chief Public Safety Director
Choice	Votes	%
For	156,715	60.36
Against	102,919	39.64
Total	259,634	100.00
Source: Philadelphia City Commissioners

=== General election ===
Proposal 1 results by ward Yes: 70%–80%; 80%–90%; 90%–100%

Proposed Charter Change 1: Create the Office for People with Disabilities
Choice	Votes	%
For	252,788	86.51
Against	39,414	13.49
Total	292,202	100.00
Source: Philadelphia City Commissioners
