= 2027 Philadelphia municipal election =

2027 Pennsylvania local election

- November 2, 2027

A general election will be held in Philadelphia, Pennsylvania, on November 2, 2027, to elect various city and county-level positions. Primary elections will be held on May 18.

== Mayor ==
Incumbent Democratic mayor Cherelle Parker is eligible to run for re-election.

== City Council ==
All 17 seats on the Philadelphia City Council are up for election.

== Sheriff ==
=== Democratic primary ===
==== Candidates ====
===== Declared =====
- Jennifer Vrana, former police lieutenant

===== Potential =====
- Rochelle Bilal, incumbent sheriff

== Register of Wills ==
=== Democratic primary ===
==== Candidates ====
===== Declared =====
- Michael Byrd, former city council staffer

===== Potential =====
- John Sabatina Sr., incumbent register of wills

== City Commission ==
All three Philadelphia City Commissioners are up for election. No political party can have more than two seats on the board.

=== Democratic primary ===
==== Candidates ====
===== Declared =====
- Lauren Rinaldi, vice chair of the Philadelphia Democratic Party

===== Publicly expressed interest =====
- Omar Sabir, incumbent commissioner (2020–present)
- Lisa Deeley, incumbent commissioner (2016–present)

=== Republican primary ===
==== Candidates ====
===== Potential =====
- Seth Bluestein, incumbent commissioner
