= Controversies surrounding Uber =

Uber, officially Uber Technologies Inc., has been the subject of controversies. Like other ridesharing companies, the company classifies its drivers as gig workers/independent contractors. This has become the subject of legal action in several jurisdictions. The company has disrupted taxicab businesses and allegedly caused an increase in traffic congestion. Ridesharing companies are regulated in many jurisdictions and the Uber platform is not available in several countries where the company is not able or willing to comply with local regulations. Other controversies involving Uber include various unethical practices such as aggressive lobbying and ignoring and evading local regulations. Many of these were revealed by a leak of documents showing controversial activity between 2013 and 2017 under the leadership of Travis Kalanick.

== Ignoring and evading local regulations ==
Uber has been criticized for its strategy of generally commencing operations in a city or country without regard for local regulations. If faced with regulatory opposition, Uber called for public support for its service and mounted a political campaign, supported by lobbying, to change regulations. Uber argued that it is "a technology company" and not a taxi company, and therefore it was not subject to regulations affecting taxi companies. Uber's strategy was generally to "seek forgiveness rather than permission". In 2014, with regards to airport pickups without a permit in California, drivers were actually told to ignore local regulations and that the company would pay for any citations. Uber's response to California Assembly Bill 5 (2019), whereby it announced that it would not comply with the law, then engaged lobbyists and mounted an expensive public opinion campaign to overturn it via a ballot, was cited as an example of this policy.

More than 124,000 Uber documents covering the five-year period from 2012 to 2017 when Uber was run by its co-founder Travis Kalanick were leaked by Mark MacGann, a lobbyist who "led Uber's efforts to win over governments across Europe, the Middle East and Africa", to The Guardian newspaper and first printed on 10 July 2022 by its Sunday sister The Observer. This leak was called "The Uber Files." The documents revealed attempts to lobby Joe Biden, Olaf Scholz and George Osborne; how Emmanuel Macron secretly aided Uber lobbying in France, and use of a kill switch during police raids to conceal data. Travis Kalanick dismissed concerns from other executives that sending Uber drivers to a protest in France put them at risk of violence from angry opponents in the taxi industry, saying "I think it's worth it, violence guarantees success". MacGann has repeatedly credited Facebook Files whistleblower Frances Haugen with inspiring him to come forward. As of 2025, MacGann was represented by Whistleblower Partners, who also represent Haugen.

=== Legal action from taxi companies ===
Taxi companies sued Uber in numerous American cities, alleging that Uber's policy of violating taxi regulations was a form of unfair competition or a violation of antitrust law. Although some courts did find that Uber intentionally violated the taxi rules, Uber prevailed in every case, including the only case to proceed to trial. However, Uber agreed a $178 million payout in a similar class action lawsuit in Australia. The suit was filed by 8000 taxi drivers who claimed that Uber's entry into the Australian market resulted in major financial losses for them.

=== Greyball ===
In March 2017, an investigation by The New York Times revealed that Uber developed a software tool called "Greyball" to avoid giving rides to known law enforcement officers in areas where its service was illegal such as in Portland, Oregon, Australia, South Korea, and China. The tool identified government officials using geofencing, mining credit card databases, identifying devices, and searches of social media. While at first, Uber stated that it only used the tool to identify riders that violated its terms of service, after investigations by Portland, Oregon, and the United States Department of Justice, Uber admitted to using the tool to skirt local regulations and promised not to use the tool for that purpose. The use of Greyball in London was cited by Transport for London as one of the reasons for its decision not to renew Uber's private hire operator licence in September 2017.

Through the use of Greyball, Uber was capable of targeting selected individuals, for example local police, with a fake version of the app that displayed fake cars that would never arrive if contacted. This was developed with the intention of evading the law where the company's practices had been deemed illegal. Greyball was deployed in countries including Belgium, the Netherlands, Germany, Spain and Denmark, with the knowledge of senior management such as Kalanick and Pierre-Dimitri Gore-Coty. Uber said that it stopped using the app in 2017.

=== Kill switch ===
A January 2018 report by Bloomberg News stated that Uber routinely used a kill switch, codenamed "Ripley", that locked, powered off and changed passwords on staff computers when those offices were subjected to government raids. Uber allegedly used this button at least 24 times, from spring 2015 until late 2016. The existence of the kill switch was confirmed in documents leaked in 2022.

Those documents suggest this technique was used in at least France, the Netherlands, Belgium, India, Hungary and Romania. For example, it was reported that when the French competition regulator, the DGCCRF, raided Uber's offices in Paris, Uber legal director de Kievit asked an engineer in Denmark to "please kill access now". Similar procedures were used in Brussels and Amsterdam to prevent police accessing evidence. In the Netherlands, de Kievit was taken into custody and fined EUR750 for "non-compliance with an official order".

In at least one instance, Uber executives coached a manager to act surprised to police when the killswitch blocked access to internal systems.

The company claims the kill switches were not intended to obstruct justice, but rather to protect IP, customer privacy, and due process. It further claimed no data was permanently deleted, and was available for authorities to obtain later.

== Attempts to sabotage competitors ==
In 2014, Uber employees were caught ordering and then quickly cancelling rides on competing services Lyft and Gett, in an attempt to disrupt these services. In 2014, Uber was also accused of recruiting people to use competing services for the sole purpose of recruiting their drivers to Uber, at which point the recruiter would receive a commission. Uber denied that it had any involvement with the cancellation of orders or the recruitment efforts.

== Wage disputes ==
In January 2017, Uber agreed to pay $20 million to the Federal Trade Commission to resolve allegations of having misled drivers about potential earnings.

In 2017, a class action lawsuit was filed on behalf of thousands of Uber drivers, alleging that Uber’s “upfront prices” policy did not provide drivers with the 80% of fares to which they were entitled. The lawsuit was settled for $345,622, with each driver in the class getting at least $20.

In May 2017, after the New York Taxi Workers Alliance (NYTWA) filed a class-action lawsuit in federal court in New York, Uber admitted to underpaying New York City drivers tens of millions of dollars over 2.5 years by calculating driver commissions on a net amount. Uber agreed to pay the amounts owed plus interest.

== Boycott in the US ==
In late January 2017, GrabYourWallet advised to boycott Uber because the company did not join protests against Executive Order 13769, while Travis Kalanick, then CEO of Uber, was a member of Donald Trump's "business advisory council" and GrabYourWallet was advising boycotts of businesses with ties to Trump. Approximately 200,000 users deleted the Uber mobile app. On February 2, 2017, Kalanick resigned from the council, which disbanded in August 2017.

== Sexual assault of passengers and drivers ==
The New York Times wrote in a 2025 article that "Uber received a report of sexual assault or sexual misconduct in the United States almost every eight minutes on average between 2017 and 2022".

== Sexual harassment of corporate employees ==
On February 19, 2017, former Uber engineer Susan Fowler published on her website that she was propositioned for sex by a manager and subsequently threatened with termination of employment by another manager if she continued to report the incident. Kalanick was alleged to have been aware of the complaint. On February 27, 2017, Amit Singhal, Uber's Senior Vice President of Engineering, was forced to resign after he failed to disclose a sexual harassment claim against him that occurred while he served as Vice President of Google Search. After investigations led by former attorney general Eric Holder and Arianna Huffington, a member of Uber's board of directors, in June 2017, Uber fired over 20 employees. Kalanick took an indefinite leave of absence but, under pressure from investors, he resigned as CEO a week later. Also departing the company in June 2017 was Emil Michael, a senior vice president who suggested that Uber hire a team of opposition researchers and journalists, with a million-dollar budget, to "dig up dirt" on the personal lives and backgrounds of media figures who reported negatively about Uber, specifically targeting Sarah Lacy, editor of PandoDaily, who, in an article published in October 2014, accused Uber of sexism and misogyny in its advertising. In August 2018, Uber agreed to pay a total of $7 million to settle claims of gender discrimination, harassment, and hostile work environment, with 480 employees and former employees receiving $10,700 each and 56 of those employees and former employees receiving an additional $33,900 each. In December 2019, Kalanick resigned from the board of directors of the company and sold his shares.

== God view and privacy concerns ==
In November 2014, then U.S. Senator Al Franken, Chairman of the United States Senate Judiciary Subcommittee on Privacy, Technology and the Law, expressed concerns regarding ride sharing privacy, specifically Uber's "God View", whereby the whereabouts of specific customers, including journalists and politicians, are able to be tracked by Uber insiders. In December 2014, in response to Franken, Uber implemented restrictions on that function.

In 2012, an Uber employee tracked the frequency of probable one-night stands in six U.S. cities by day and neighborhood, by correlating late-night and next-day trips. The blog posting coined the term "ride of glory" for the Uber equivalent of a walk of shame.

== Delayed disclosure of data breaches ==
On February 27, 2015, Uber admitted that it had suffered a data breach more than nine months prior. Names and license plate information from approximately 50,000 drivers were inadvertently disclosed. Uber discovered this leak in September 2014, but waited more than five months to notify the affected individuals.

An announcement in November 2017 revealed that in 2016, a separate data breach had disclosed the personal information of 600,000 drivers and 57 million customers. This data included names, email addresses, phone numbers, and drivers' license information. Hackers used employees' usernames and passwords that had been compromised in previous breaches (a "credential stuffing" method) to gain access to a private GitHub repository used by Uber's developers. The hackers located credentials for the company's Amazon Web Services datastore in the repository files, and were able to obtain access to the account records of users and drivers, as well as other data contained in over 100 Amazon S3 buckets. Uber paid a $100,000 ransom to the hackers on the promise they would delete the stolen data. Uber was subsequently criticized for concealing this data breach. Khosrowshahi publicly apologized. In September 2018, in the largest multi-state settlement of a data breach, Uber paid $148 million to the Federal Trade Commission, admitted that its claim that internal access to consumers' personal information was closely monitored on an ongoing basis was false, and stated that it had failed to live up to its promise to provide reasonable security for consumer data. Also in November 2018, Uber's British divisions were fined £385,000 (reduced to £308,000) by the Information Commissioner's Office.

In 2020, the US Department of Justice announced criminal charges against former Chief Security Officer Joe Sullivan for obstruction of justice. The criminal complaint said Sullivan arranged, with Kalanick's knowledge, to pay a ransom for the 2016 breach as a "bug bounty" to conceal its true nature, and for the hackers to falsify non-disclosure agreements to say they had not obtained any data.

== Tax evasion ==
In November 2017, the Paradise Papers, a set of confidential electronic documents relating to offshore investment, revealed that Uber is one of many corporations that used an offshore company to minimize taxes.

London-based executive Fraser Robinson was asked to move to Amsterdam to persuade UK tax collectors that the company was not partly managed in the UK. (Under UK law, being partly managed in the UK, for example by having senior executives in London, would make a company taxable in the UK.) He refused to move, possibly for family reasons, and stepped down.

== Drivers' employment status ==
An Employment Tribunal decision recorded in 2016 ruled that Uber's drivers are not self-employed persons, but are actually "workers", as defined in UK employment law, giving them rights to paid annual leave and to be paid the national minimum wage.

== Discrimination against a blind customer ==
In April 2021, an arbitrator ruled against Uber in a case involving Lisa Irving, a blind American customer with a guide dog who was denied rides on 14 separate occasions. Uber was ordered to pay US$1.1 million, reflecting $324,000 in damages and more than $800,000 in attorney fees and court costs.

== Court of Amsterdam case on 'robo-firings' ==
In April 2021, the court of Amsterdam ruled that Uber has to reinstate and pay compensation to six drivers that were allegedly automatically terminated solely due to algorithms, which is in violation of Article 22 of GDPR, which relates to automated decisions causing "legal or significant impact". Uber challenged the ruling, claiming it was not aware of the case and that the judgement was brought by default without the company ever being notified; however, the decision was upheld.

== Racial discrimination ==
In October 2020, a class action lawsuit was filed on behalf of all non-White drivers, alleging there was racial discrimination in how it uses passengers’ reviews to evaluate drivers. Driver evaluation relies on Uber's star rating system, which the lawsuit says disproportionately leads to the firing of people who are not white or who speak with accents. The case argues that "Uber’s reliance on customer ratings to determine driver termination constitutes race discrimination, as it is widely recognized that customer evaluations of workers are frequently racially biased." The lawsuit was dismissed in August 2021 due to lack of evidence to prove that the rating system has a racially disparate impact and that Uber intentionally discriminated against the lead plaintiff. However, the judge acknowledged the plausibility of the case and granted permission to file a new complaint.

In October 2021, Uber was sued in London over allegations that its facial recognition system could not effectively identify people with darker skin and had prevented some people from using the platform, thereby discriminating against people of color.

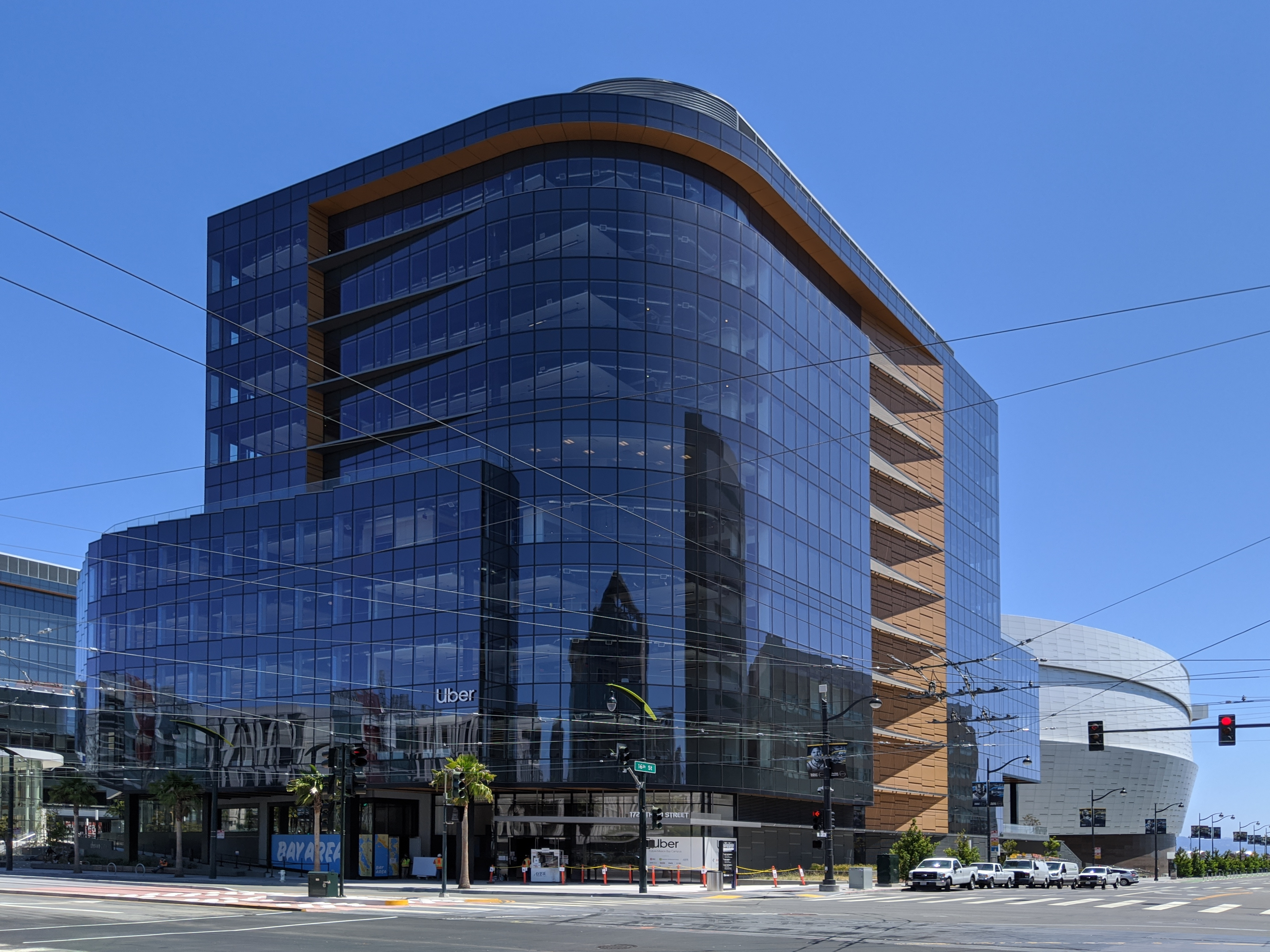
Head office of Uber, San Francisco

== Passenger safety ==
On 5 December 2014, a passenger was assaulted in an Uber cab by its driver in New Delhi. Following this, Uber was temporarily withdrawn and then forced to manage operations through an Indian subsidiary. Uber also ran into disputes with the Reserve Bank of India, the Income Tax department and consumer courts. Following this, a 'kill switch' was used to prevent Indian authorities accessing evidence. Uber Manager Rob van der Woude described the system in an e-mail - "what we did in India is have the city team be as cooperative as possible and have [Uber] BV take the heat. E.g. Whenever the local team was called to provide the information, we shut them down from the system making it practically impossible for them to give out any info despite their willingness to do so. At the same time we kept directing the authorities to talk to [Uber] BV representatives instead." In another mail, Allen Penn, Uber's Asia head, told employees "we will generally stall, be unresponsive, and often say no to what they want. This is how we operate and it’s nearly always the best". The Indian Express also found that in most Uber cabs, safety features mandated by the Delhi Government, such as a panic button, were not present or did not work.

== Driver safety ==
In one exchange, Kalanick was quoted as saying that sending Uber drivers to a protest in France was "worth it", despite the risk of violence from angry taxi drivers. Warned that "extreme right thugs" had infiltrated the protest and were "spoiling for a fight", he was quoted as saying that "violence guarantee[s] success".

The Washington Post reported that the documents, together with interviews with Uber drivers, showed that Uber knowingly created working conditions that resulted in its drivers barely scraping by, and created a system that rewarded drivers for taking routes and schedules that put them at risk of harm in violence-plagued areas.

== Arbitration agreements and class action waivers ==
Uber's arbitration clause and class action waiver in its driver and rider terms of service, which requires that both the rider/driver and Uber waive their rights to file a lawsuit in court against the company, has come under significant scrutiny by the Pennsylvania Superior Court. Uber's arbitration clause was found to be in violation of the Pennsylvania state Constitution numerous times between 2022 and 2023. The Superior Court of Pennsylvania, an appellate court in the state, ruled in a 2023 lawsuit against the company by Shannon and Keith Chilutti that the right to a jury trial is enshrined deeply in the state constitution, and any waiver of it must be placed in bold text at the top of a contract. According to Bloomberg Law correspondent Chris Marr, the Chilutti ruling places Pennsylvania as having one of the strongest protections against arbitration clauses.

Judge Daniel D. McCaffery, in a 2-1 majority with judge Alice Beck Dubow concurring, ruled that even though a Ninth Circuit ruling in Berman v. Freedom Financial Network, which itself found that "browsewrap" agreements are enforceable where there is conspicuous notice provided by one party to the other as well as an action required to assert agreement, would find that Uber's agreement is conscionable, Pennsylvania's constitution requires a more stringent set of procedures in order to make clear to all parties there is an "unambiguous manifestation of assent to arbitration", which was failed to be provided to the Chilutti's. The dissenting judge, Victor P. Stabile, rejected McCaffery's assessment on procedural grounds, writing that the appealed trial court's order to compel arbitration was not the final ruling in the case.

Lawyers for Uber, which included attorneys from law firms Morgan Lewis & Bockius and Vaughan Baio & Partners, did not comment to Bloomberg law, though an attorney for the Chiluttis from Messa & Associates P.C, Joseph L. Messa Jr., commended the Superior Court's ruling and its broad implication for Pennsylvania businesses. Messa blasted the concept of arbitration agreements in his praise for the court, arguing that he can’t think of any other constitutional right you give up by clicking an agreement to purchase a service".
