= Rochelle Bilal =

American politician

Philadelphia Sheriff
- Incumbent
- Assumed office January 6, 2020
- Preceded by: Jewell Williams

Personal details
- Born: 1957 or 1958 (age 68–69) Philadelphia, Pennsylvania, U.S.
- Website: Campaign website

Rochelle Bilal is an American politician affiliated with the Democratic Party who has served as the Sheriff of Philadelphia County since 2020. She is the first woman to hold the office.

== Career ==
Bilal was born and raised in Philadelphia, Pennsylvania. She was a police officer with the Philadelphia Police Department for 27 years, retiring in 2013. She has served as the president of the Guardian Civic League – an organization for Philadelphia's black police officers – and secretary of the Philadelphia NAACP.

=== Philadelphia sheriff ===
In the 2019 Philadelphia sheriff election, Bilal defeated incumbent Jewell Williams in the Democratic primary and ran unopposed in the general election. She is the first woman to hold the office. She was reelected in the 2023 Philadelphia municipal election, defeating Republican Mark LaVelle.

In January 2026, amid an increase in action by United States Immigration and Customs Enforcement (ICE) and following the fatal shooting of Renee Good, Bilal received national attention for criticizing ICE agents, whom she characterized as "fake, wannabe law enforcement."

==== Controversy ====
Bilal's office has been subject to accusations of financial mismanagement, including millions of dollars in slush fund spending.

In 2024, the Philadelphia Inquirer reported that under Bilal, there had been unexplained delays in the recording of deeds following sheriff's auctions. In August 2026, following complaints from property buyers, a judge ordered a six month, independent review of the Philadelphia Sheriff's Office's deed handling process.
