= Alice Beck Dubow =

American judge

Judge of the Superior Court of Pennsylvania
- Incumbent
- Assumed office January 4, 2016
- Preceded by: Patricia H. Jenkins

Personal details
- Party: Democratic
- Education: University of Pennsylvania (B.A.); University of Pennsylvania Law School (J.D.)

Alice Beck Dubow is an American judge who serves as a judge on the Superior Court of Pennsylvania. She was elected to the court in 2015. Previously, she served as a judge of the Philadelphia Court of Common Pleas.

== Education and legal career ==
Dubow earned a Bachelor of Arts degree from the University of Pennsylvania in 1981 and a Juris Doctor from the University of Pennsylvania Law School in 1984.

Before becoming a judge, Dubow practiced law in a private practice, served in the Philadelphia city solicitor's office, worked as deputy general counsel for Drexel University, and later maintained her own practice. She was elected to the Philadelphia County Court of Common Pleas in 2007 and began a ten-year term in 2008. On that court, she served in family, criminal, and civil divisions.

== Superior Court of Pennsylvania ==
In 2015, Dubow ran as a Democrat for an open seat on the Superior Court of Pennsylvania. The seat had been filled on an interim basis by Patricia H. Jenkins, who was appointed after Correale F. Stevens was appointed to the Supreme Court of Pennsylvania.

Dubow defeated Robert Colville in the Democratic primary election. She was elected in the November 2015 general election and was sworn in on January 15, 2016.

== Judicial opinions ==
Dubow joined the Superior Court's opinion in Chilutti v. Uber Technologies, Inc., which stated that an arbitration agreement buried behind a hyperlink that does not give consumers clear notice they are waiving their right to a jury trial when they agree to the company’s terms and conditions.

In a concurring opinion in a criminal sentencing case, Dubow urged the Supreme Court of Pennsylvania to reconsider mandatory life imprisonment without parole sentences for second-degree murder in light of developments in other states, criminal-justice research, and policy concerns. The Pennsylvania Supreme Court agreed to hear the challenge.

== Personal life ==
Dubow is the daughter of Phyllis W. Beck, a former judge of the Superior Court of Pennsylvania.

== See also ==
- Superior Court of Pennsylvania
- Pennsylvania courts of common pleas
- Elections in Pennsylvania
