= HUD Neighborhood Networks =

Provide HUD residents with access to technology

The United States Department of Housing and Urban Development Neighborhood Networks Initiative, or HUD Neighborhood Networks, was initiated in 1995 to provide access to technology for residents of HUD multifamily housing by developing computer learning centers at HUD housing sites.

By the year 2007, approximately 1,500 Neighborhood Networks Centers had been developed throughout the United States.
