= R. Seth Williams =

Former district attorney (born 1967)

Seth Williams
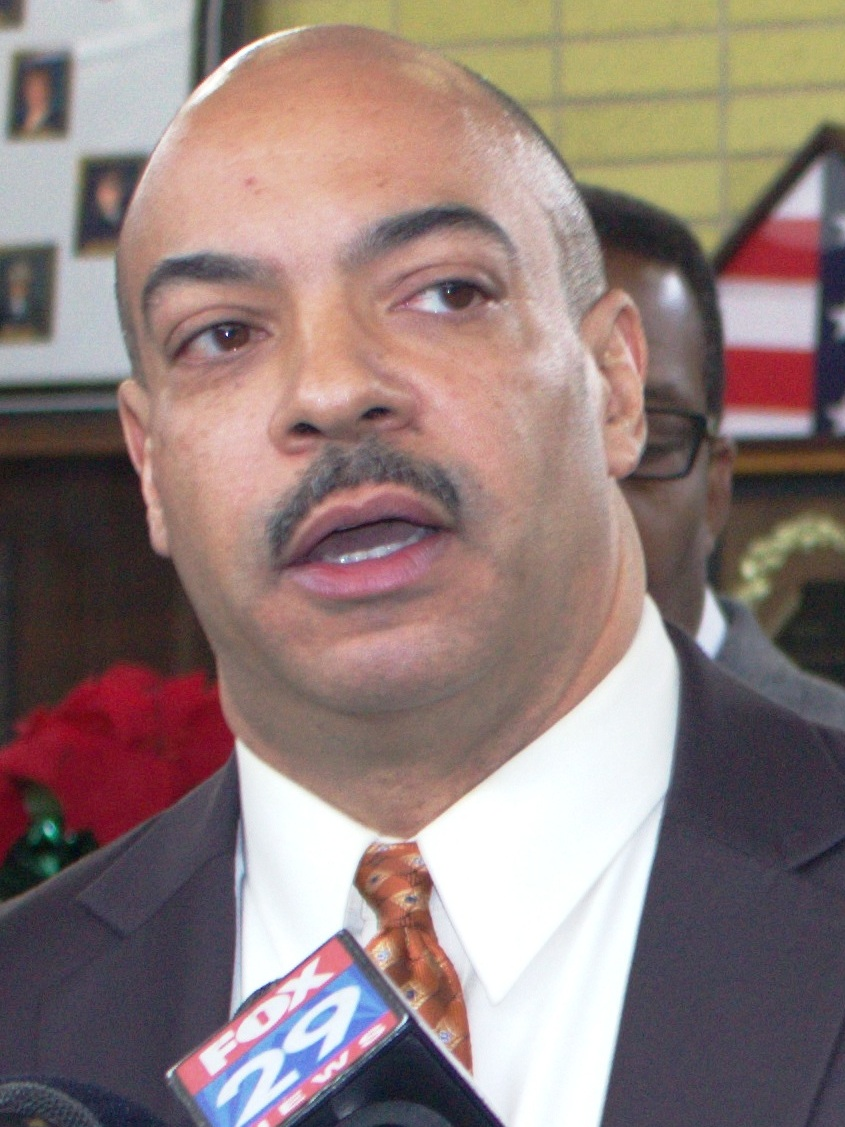
- Williams in 2016

24th District Attorney of Philadelphia
- In office January 4, 2010 – July 24, 2017
- Preceded by: Lynne Abraham
- Succeeded by: Kelley B. Hodge (Interim)

Personal details
- Born: January 2, 1967 (age 59)
- Party: Democratic
- Education: Pennsylvania State University (BA); Georgetown University Law Center (JD)
- Criminal information
- Status: Released in April 2020

Rufus Seth Williams (born January 2, 1967) is an American judge and lawyer who served Philadelphia's district attorney from 2010 to 2017. Williams was the first African-American district attorney in Philadelphia and in the Commonwealth of Pennsylvania. On March 21, 2017, Williams was indicted on 23 counts of bribery, extortion, and fraud. His trial began June 19, 2017. He resigned and pleaded guilty to one charge on June 29, 2017.

== Early life and education ==
Williams was put up for adoption after his birth. After placement in two foster homes, he was adopted and grew up in West Philadelphia. He was the only child of Rufus O. Williams, a teacher at Sulzberger Middle School, and his wife, Imelda, a secretary at the Philadelphia Naval Shipyard.

He graduated from Central High School in 1985, and attended Penn State, where he served as President of the Penn State Student Black Caucus, the Undergraduate Student Government. As a student activist, he led a 102-mile march to the state capital at Harrisburg to get Penn State to divest from South Africa.

He graduated from Georgetown University Law Center in 1992.

== Early career ==
After graduating from Georgetown, Williams joined the Philadelphia district attorney's office. He served 10 years as an assistant district attorney. In that time, he was appointed assistant chief of the Municipal Court, where he supervised the 30 newest prosecutors. He also created and led the Repeat Offenders Unit, with the goal of reducing the high percentage of crimes committed by repeat offenders. His courtroom experience includes 37 jury trials, more than 1,500 bench trials, and more than 2,500 felony preliminary hearings.

In 2005, he challenged Lynne Abraham, Philadelphia's longtime incumbent district attorney, in the Democratic primary, but lost with 46% of the vote. Following the election, he was appointed by the mayor as Inspector General of the City of Philadelphia, where he was responsible for investigating allegations of corruption, fraud, waste, abuse and employee misconduct among municipal workers and companies doing business with the city. He left in 2008 to take a position as counsel at Stradley, Ronon, Stevens & Young, a Center City law firm.

== District Attorney ==
=== Election ===
On November 3, 2009, Williams was elected District Attorney of Philadelphia. Winning more than 75% of the vote, he became the first African-American district attorney of Philadelphia and in the Commonwealth of Pennsylvania. He was sworn on January 4, 2010, succeeding Abraham. During his period in office, Williams served as an adjunct professor at Temple and Villanova universities, as well as an advisory board member at Penn State Abington. He is a major in the Judge Advocate General's Corps, United States Army.

=== Kermit Gosnell ===
In January 2011, Williams' office brought multiple charges through a grand jury against Philadelphia doctor Kermit Gosnell, for allegedly killing infants after birth. In 2013, Gosnell was convicted of killing three infants who were born alive during abortion procedures. He was sentenced to life in prison.

=== Catholic Church ===
In 2011, Williams initiated the prosecution of what became known as the "Billy Doe" case - the prosecution of three priests and a schoolteacher for sexual abuse of an altar boy and student (pseudonym Billy Doe). During proceedings, the youth's account of the alleged abuse changed, and doubts were raised about the veracity of the charges brought by Williams. According to a Newsweek article by Ralph Cipriano, Williams "has not explained any of the factual discrepancies in Billy's many stories, and why the D.A. would proceed with what Williams described as a 'historic' prosecution of the church with a star witness so lacking in credibility."

The accused priest, Msgr William Lynn, was convicted, but has been in the appeals process (including another trial) ever since; the latest iteration was delayed from March 2020 to 2021 due to the COVID-19 pandemic. He has maintained his innocence.

Williams also brought charges against another priest, Fr Robert L. Brennan, a priest who had been defrocked in 2005. The charges were later dropped after the sole witness died of a drug overdose. Brennan was indicted again, this time on federal charges, in 2019.

=== Porngate ===
A scandal dubbed "Porngate" was revealed by the media in the state, who reported that government employees and officials had used Pennsylvania government computers to disseminate pornographic, misogynistic, and racially charged emails. The publicity resulted in the resignation of Pennsylvania Supreme Court Justice Seamus McCaffery. It also resulted in the suspension of Supreme Court Justice J. Michael Eakin. Frank Fina, Patrick Blessington and Marc Costanzo, prosecutors for former Pennsylvania Attorney General Tom Corbett, were part of an email chain during this period that swapped the pornographic and offensive messages.

These three were later hired by Williams for the Philadelphia District Attorney's Office. When this was reported, the content of their emails was subsequently released, prompting outrage. All five women on the City Council called for Williams to fire the three prosecutors. After considerable pressure, Williams reassigned the prosecutors, but did not fire them. Fina was permitted by Williams to voluntarily resign in 2016 in order to fulfill a pre-determined plan to start his own private law practice. Costanzo and Blessington continued to work in the DA's office.

=== Impropriety ===
On February 10, 2017, Williams announced he would not seek re-election of a third term in office due to political scandals. He was charged with failing to disclose $160,500 worth of gifts between 2010 and 2015, and was the subject of an FBI/IRS investigation into his finances. On March 21, he was indicted.

== Criminal conviction ==
On March 21, 2017, the US Department of Justice announced that they had indicted Williams on "bribery and extortion charges". Williams was disbarred effective April 13, 2017 by court order.

Williams was accused of accepting bribes, totaling more than $175,000 in undisclosed "gifts," for which he had already been fined $62,000 by the Philadelphia Board of Ethics. Williams was also accused of having misappropriated more than $20,000 in Social Security and pension income that was intended to pay for his mother's nursing home expenses and using those funds to pay his personal mortgage and utility bills.

On June 29, 2017, Williams pleaded guilty to one count of bribery contrary to Pennsylvania law, which is punishable up to 5 years in prison with the maximum potential fine of $250,000. The plea agreement was announced during the eighth day of his trial, as federal prosecutors outlined their 29-count corruption case against Williams. U.S. District Judge Paul Diamond announced to the court that though the plea agreement convicted Williams of one of the 29 charges he faced, Williams had to admit to the underlying facts of the other 28 charges, including extortion, fraud and bribery.

A request from Williams' attorney that he be allowed to see his mother before serving his sentence prompted this response from the judge, "The English language doesn't have the word to capture the outrageousness of that request," said Diamond. "The defendant stole from his mother and now wants to visit her?"

Judge Diamond revoked Williams' bail and remanded him to a federal jail in Philadelphia. On October 24, 2017, he was sentenced to five years. He was held in a federal prison in Morgantown, West Virginia. His sentence was later reduced to less than three years on account of completing a drug rehabilitation program in prison and maintaining good behavior; he was released in April 2020 and returned to Philadelphia.

== Honors ==
In October 2011, Williams received an Alumni Fellow Award from Pennsylvania State University.

== Personal life ==
Williams married a woman named Sonita, and they had three daughters together. After he and his wife separated in 2011, their daughters lived with her.

Williams is Catholic. He was a parishioner of St. Cyprian Roman Catholic Church.

Legal offices
Preceded by Lynne Abraham	District Attorney of Philadelphia, Pennsylvania; 2010–2017	Succeeded by Larry Krasner
