= Lynne Abraham =

American attorney and judge (born 1941)

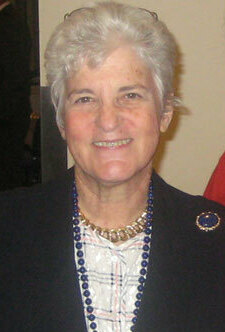

23rd District Attorney of Philadelphia
- In office May 15, 1991 – January 4, 2010
- Preceded by: Ronald D. Castille
- Succeeded by: R. Seth Williams

Judge of the Philadelphia Municipal Court
- In office 1980–1991

Judge of the Philadelphia Court of Common Pleas
- In office 1977–1980

Personal details
- Born: January 31, 1941 (age 85) Philadelphia, Pennsylvania, U.S.
- Party: Democratic
- Spouse: Frank Ford (deceased)
- Education: Temple University (JD)

Lynne Marsha Abraham (born January 31, 1941) is an American attorney who served as district attorney of Philadelphia from May 1991 to January 2010. She was the first woman to hold the office and was elected to four terms. She ran unsuccessfully for the Democratic nomination for Mayor of Philadelphia in 2015.

Abraham is sometimes regarded as having been among the United States' "deadliest" prosecutors because she sought and obtained the death penalty more frequently than most district attorneys.

== Early life and education ==
Abraham was born in 1941 and raised in Philadelphia, where she was educated in Philadelphia public schools. The daughter of first-generation Americans, she grew up on the margins of poverty. Her grandparents were a tailor and a butcher from Europe. She studied at Temple University for her undergraduate degree and received her Juris Doctor from Temple University Beasley School of Law.

== Career ==
Abraham served as a legislative consultant for the city council of Philadelphia. She served as the head of the Philadelphia Redevelopment Authority during the administration of Mayor Frank Rizzo. She was elected Judge of the Philadelphia Municipal Court in 1977, then was elected to the Court of Common Pleas in 1980, where she presided over criminal trials until she became district attorney in 1991.

=== District Attorney ===
Abraham was elected by Philadelphia judges to take over as District Attorney in 1991 when then-District Attorney Ronald D. Castille, later Chief Justice of the Pennsylvania Supreme Court, stepped down from the District Attorney post in order to run for mayor. The Board of Judges elected Abraham by a thin 39-37 margin.

As an incumbent, Abraham was elected to a four-year term in 1993. She was re-elected three more times; in 1997 (defeating challengers Jack McMahon and Leon Williams), 2001 (defeating challengers Alexander Talmadge and Leon Williams) and 2005 (defeating challenger Seth Williams, who would succeed her as District Attorney five years later).

Abraham held the office of district attorney longer than anyone else in Philadelphia history, during which time she saw 108 capital sentences returned. She earned the nicknames "Deadliest DA" and "Queen of Death" for the high rate at which her office, especially prosecutor Roger King, sought the death penalty in past decades.

In 2007, Abraham charged William J. Barnes for the murder of a police officer, whom Barnes shot forty-one years earlier during a failed burglary. The officer survived, but died in 2007 from a urinary tract infection. Barnes had served twenty years for the incident, but Abraham believed she could prove causation between Barnes' shot and the urinary tract infection. Despite Barnes having reformed his life, he was incarcerated until he was acquitted of the homicide in 2010.

=== Post-District Attorney career ===
In the 2004 presidential election, Abraham served as one of Pennsylvania's electors, casting her ballot for John Kerry. In the 2008 election, she cast her electoral ballot for Barack Obama. Abraham retired in 2009, and was replaced by Seth Williams.

In 2015, Abraham ran for Mayor of Philadelphia in 2015 and finished third among six candidates in the Democratic primary. In 2017, Abraham applied to serve as interim district attorney following the resignation of Seth Williams, who had pleaded guilty in a federal corruption case. The Philadelphia NAACP publicly opposed her appointment.

Abraham is co-founder of I-LEAD Charter School in Reading, Pennsylvania.

== Personal life ==
Abraham was married to Frank Ford until his death in March 2009.

Legal offices
Preceded by Ron Castille	District Attorney of Philadelphia, Pennsylvania; 1991–2010	Succeeded by Seth Williams
