= Margaret Tartaglione =

Philadelphia politician

City Commissioner of Philadelphia
- In office January 5, 1976 – January 2, 2012

Personal details
- Born: Margaret M. Warnecka; February 1, 1933 Philadelphia, Pennsylvania, U.S.
- Died: July 9, 2019 (aged 86)
- Party: Democratic
- Spouse: Eugene Tartaglione
- Children: 5, including Tina Tartaglione

Margaret “Marge” Tartaglione (February 1, 1933 – July 9, 2019) was a Democratic politician from Philadelphia who served as city commissioner. She was elected in 1975 serving until 2011. She was the Democratic chairwoman of the 62nd Ward in Northeast Philadelphia from the 1960s until her death.

== Early life ==
Tartaglione was born Margaret M. Warnecka in Port Richmond of Polish ancestry, graduating from the Nativity Commercial School. She married Eugene Tartaglione in 1950 with whom she had five children. The family lived in Oxford Circle of Northeast Philadelphia, and in the 1960s she was recruited by the Democratic Party to serve as a committee person and was soon elected Democratic ward leader for the 62nd ward.

== Political career ==
Tartaglione was elected to the Board of City Commissioners in 1975 on the ticket headed by Frank Rizzo and served until she was defeated in 2011. She was the first Democratic woman to be elected citywide, and served nearly 40 years in the Philadelphia City Commissions Office, mostly as chairperson, the longest tenure of any commissioner since the office was formed in the 1850s. She oversaw Philadelphia City elections and is credited with hiring and maintaining an effective team of civil service workers, implementing computerized voting, and instituting the policy of "sunshine meetings" in which the city commissioners are required to discuss and vote on matters in public. Jim Kenney, city councilman when Tartaglione left office and later mayor of Philadelphia, noted that critics of the system often failed to appreciate the immense challenges involved, and that she and her team managed Election Day with the precision and coordination of military generals.

Known for her raspy voice and sharp wit, Tartaglione was regarded as a tough veteran ward leader who was known for speaking her mind. When a rival crossed her she would clearly let them know while also opening doors for women in local politics. Holding ward meetings in the basement of her Oxford Circle home, she was noted for requiring candidates to sing in front of her ward committee members before considering them for an endorsement. City councilman Mark Squilla said she and the committee people mostly discussed city services, not bigger political issues, i.e. quality-of-life issues like fixing a pothole or streetlight rather than a specific policy.

== Criticism ==
In 1978, she moved a polling place shortly before election which prompted a complaint from then state Rep. Bob O'Donnell which led to district attorney Ed Rendell charging her with violating election code, leading to her arrest on election day. The charges were dropped and she sued O’Donnell, later settling with him out of court.

In 1994, a judge ordered the removal of William G. Stinson from the Pennsylvania State Senate due to a voting scandal in the Second Senate District, where the two Democratic commissioners including Tartaglione were accused of allowing absentee ballot packages to be distributed via Stinson’s campaign instead of directly to voters, contrary to election rules, and failing to properly timestamp and verify voter signatures. His ruling sharply criticized Tartaglione, finding her complicit in enabling the fraud, accusing her of failing to prevent and potentially facilitating misconduct. She claimed the ruling unfairly disenfranchised voters and compared it to the Dred Scott decision. The Republication commissioner John F. Kane said he was unaware of any misconduct. When later asked if her constituents were upset about the absentee voting scandal she said that they were not since they knew her.

In 2010, the Committee of Seventy criticized the Philadelphia commissioners about their management of elections, recommending they do more to stop electioneering within ten feet of polling places as well as provide more training for and transparency of poll worker positions.

== Family in politics ==
Marge Tartaglione was also the matriarch of a political family, including her daughters, State Sen. Christine “Tina” Tartaglione and Renee Tartaglione Matos. Renee, who served as chief of staff in her mother’s city commissioners office, retired from her position as deputy elections commissioner after a Board of Ethics investigation determined that she ordered ballots that misled voters and collected street money for her mother and husband’s election funds. Renee was later imprisoned for federal fraud and theft convictions.

When her daughter Tina ran for the Pennsylvania State Senate 2nd district seat in 1994, in the primary race the challenger Harvey Rice printed a ballot that said he was the endorsed candidate when Tina was the party’s pick. When Marge found out she called the district attorney Lynne Abraham, party chairman Bob Brady, and anyone else she could think of so that early in the morning a lawyer was working on court pleadings and by noon a judge had ordered Rice, who was supported by then mayor Ed Rendell, to stop handing out the ballot. Rice called this court order an abuse of Marge Tartaglione’s power. Tina defeated Rice in the primary and won the general election by a 393 vote margin, and as of 2024 still holds this office.
