= Jewell Williams =

American politician (born 1957)

Philadelphia Sheriff
- In office January 2, 2012 – January 6, 2020
- Preceded by: Barbara Deeley (Acting)
- Succeeded by: Rochelle Bilal

Member of the Pennsylvania House of Representatives from the 197th district
- In office January 2, 2001 – January 2, 2012
- Preceded by: Andrew Carn
- Succeeded by: Gary Williams

Personal details
- Born: September 8, 1957 (age 69) Philadelphia, Pennsylvania
- Party: Democratic
- Education: Holy Family College, Philadelphia Police Academy

Jewell Williams (born September 8, 1957) is a Democratic politician, formerly serving as the Sheriff of Philadelphia. He is a former member of the Pennsylvania House of Representatives, representing the 197th District from 2001 to 2012.
