= Philadelphia City Commissioners =

The Philadelphia City Commissioners are three officials responsible for administering voter registration and conducting elections for Philadelphia County.

The office was created to replace the Philadelphia County Commissioners following the consolidation of the city and county in 1854. While subject to the Home Rule Charter, the commissioners are considered county officials and do not report to council or the mayor.

The board has three members, all popularly elected every four years by the voters of Philadelphia. No political party can have more than two seats on the board. For the last half-century the guaranteed minority seat has gone to the Republican Party.

== Current members ==
Name	Year first elected	Party
Omar Sabir†`	2019	Democratic
Seth Bluestein	2022 (Note: Bluestein was confirmed as a City Commissioner in February 2022 to fill the remainder of Al Schmidt's term through January 2024.)	Forward Republican
Lisa M Deeley	2015	Democratic

† Denotes chairperson of the board

== Historical members ==
Commissioners elected under the 1873 Constitution
Election	Commissioners		
1875	John S. Wetter	David Martin	Thomas A. Fahy
1878	William S. Douglass	David Martin	John C. McManemin
1881	William S. Douglass	William Lawson	Charles H. Krumbhaar (Note: Citizens' Party)
1884	William S. Douglass	William Lawson	Charles H. Krumbhaar
1887	William Bartley	Theodore B. Stulb	John J.P. Sensenderfer
1890	William Bartley	Theodore B. Stulb	John J.P. Sensenderfer
1893	Jacob Wildemore	Joseph G. Richmond	John J.P. Sensenderfer
1896	Jacob Wildemore	Joseph G. Richmond	Thomas J. Ryan
1899	Jacob Wildemore	Hugh Black	Thomas J. Ryan
1902	Jacob Wildemore	Hugh Black	Charles P. Donnelly
1905	Howard A. Chase	Rudolph Blankenburg (Note: City Party)	Edward A. Anderson
1908	Harry D. Beaston	Robert J. Moore	Frank J. Gorman (Note: Philadelphia Party)
1911	John D. Powers	Robert J. Moore	Frank J. Gorman (Note: Elected on Democratic and Keystone party tickets)
1915	David S. Scott	Robert J. Moore	George F. Holmes (Note: Franklin-Washington Party)
1917 (Note: Vacancy filled after Scott died in office)	Henry Kuenzel	Robert J. Moore	George F. Holmes
1918 (Note: Vacancy filled after Moore died in office)	Henry Kuenzel	James H. Gay	George F. Holmes
1919	Henry Kuenzel	George F. Holmes	Edgar W. Lank
1923	Henry Kuenzel	George F. Holmes	John O'Donnell
1927	Henry Kuenzel	George F. Holmes	John O'Donnell
1931	John F. Dugan	James C. Clark	John O'Donnell
1935	Mortin Witkin	James C. Clark	John J. Hennessey
1939	Mortin Witkin	James C. Clark	Joseph E. Gold
1943	Mortin Witkin	David E. Watson	John J. Hennessey
1945 (Note: Vacancy when Hennessey died in office)	Mortin Witkin	David E. Watson	Thomas P. McHenry
1947	Mortin Witkin	David E. Watson	Thomas P. McHenry
1951	Walter I. Davidson	Maurice S. Osser	Thomas P. McHenry
1955	Walter I. Davidson	Maurice S. Osser	Thomas P. McHenry
1959	Louis Menna	Maurice S. Osser	Thomas P. McHenry
1963	Louis Menna	Maurice S. Osser	Thomas P. McHenry
1967	Raymond Chmielewski	Maurice S. Osser	Thomas P. McHenry
May 1971 (Note: Vacancy when McHenry died in office)	Raymond Chmielewski	Maurice S. Osser	Francis B. Patterson
1971	Louis Menna	Maurice S. Osser	Francis B. Patterson
1973 (Note: Vacancy when Osser resigned)	Louis Menna	Eugene E.J. Maier	Francis B. Patterson
Feb 1975 (Note: Vacancy when Menna died in office)	John F. Kane	Eugene E.J. Maier	Francis B. Patterson
1975	John F. Kane	Eugene E.J. Maier	Margaret Tartaglione
1979	John F. Kane	Eugene E.J. Maier	Margaret Tartaglione
1983	John F. Kane	Marian Tasco	Margaret Tartaglione
1987	John F. Kane	Maurice Floyd	Margaret Tartaglione
1991	John F. Kane	Alexander Z. Talmadge	Margaret Tartaglione
1995	Joseph J. Duda	Alexander Z. Talmadge	Margaret Tartaglione
1999	Joseph J. Duda	Alexander Z. Talmadge	Margaret Tartaglione
2003	Joseph J. Duda	Edgar A. Howard	Margaret Tartaglione
2007	Joseph J. Duda	Anthony Clark	Margaret Tartaglione
2011	Al Schmidt	Anthony Clark	Stephanie Singer
2015	Al Schmidt	Anthony Clark	Lisa M. Deeley
2019	Al Schmidt	Omar Sabir	Lisa M. Deeley
2022	Seth Bluestein (Note: Affiliated as Forward Republican)	Omar Sabir	Lisa M. Deeley
2023	Seth Bluestein	Omar Sabir	Lisa M. Deeley
