= Thomas Masterson =

Thomas Masterson may refer to:

- Thomas Ambrose Masterson, American judge
- Thomas Masterson (American Revolution), officer in the American Revolution
