= 1962 Philadelphia City Council special election =

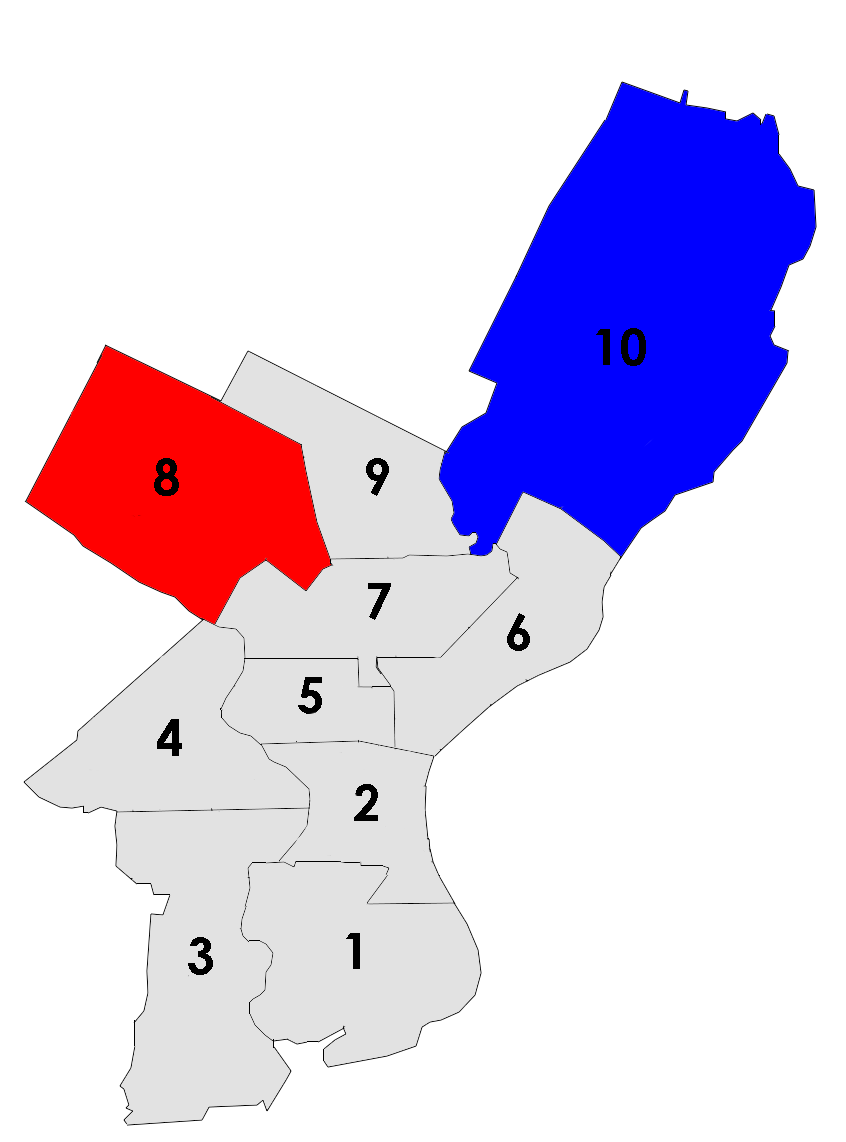
Philadelphia city council districts, highlighting the special election in the 8th and 10th districts.

Philadelphia's City Council special election of 1962 was held to fill three vacant city council seats. The first was in the 8th district, when Democrat Alfred Leopold Luongo was appointed to the federal bench in September 1961. A second vacancy that same year occurred in the 10th district when Democrat John M. McDevitt resigned in June 1962 to become a Catholic priest. An at-large seat also became vacant when Victor E. Moore resigned in September 1962 to become the head of the Philadelphia Gas Works. Special elections were scheduled for November 6, 1962, to be held at the same time as the federal and gubernatorial elections that year. Democrats held two of the seats but lost the 8th district to a Republican.

== Background ==
Alfred Leopold Luongo was a lawyer who had represented the 8th district in the northwest section of the city since 1959. The district was among the city's most marginal, electing a Democrat in 1951 and a Republican in 1955, both times by narrow margins. On September 14, 1961, President John F. Kennedy nominated Luongo to a new seat on the United States District Court for the Eastern District of Pennsylvania and he was confirmed by the Senate later that month.

In June 1962, John M. McDevitt resigned his seat to enter a Roman Catholic seminary. McDevitt had represented the 10th district, which covered much of Northeast Philadelphia, since 1955. He had won convincingly in his most recent election, carrying 58% of the vote over his Republican opponent.

In September of that year, at-large councilman Victor E. Moore resigned his seat to become head of the Philadelphia Gas Works. The at-large seat he held was safely Democratic, as that party's candidates had won the maximum possible at-large seats in each election since the seats were created in 1951. Moore had been first or second in votes in each of those three elections, including his most recent victory in 1959.

Philadelphia officials had anticipated another special election that years, as well, when Mayor Richardson Dilworth resigned to run for Governor of Pennsylvania. According to the city charter, the President of City Council, James Tate, would serve as acting mayor until a new one was elected at the next general election; however, the Pennsylvania Supreme Court ruled that the charter violated state law in calling for a municipal election in an even-numbered year. That decision required Tate to serve for another year as acting mayor, which led to another lawsuit demanding that he vacate his 7th district council seat and call a special election. That case also went to the state Supreme Court, which held that no such vacancy existed under the charter's rules and that Tate could continue to take a leave of absence without legally vacating his seat.

== Candidate selection ==
Instead of a primary, the nominees were selected by the ward leaders of the wards that made up the councilmanic districts. In the 8th, Republican ward leaders selected Stanley B. Smullen, a real estate agent who also served as the Republican leader of the 59th ward. Democratic leaders nominated John A. Geisz, the head of the inheritance tax bureau of the state board of revenue. In the 10th district, Republicans nominated Joseph Leo McGlynn Jr., an attorney. Democrats settled on Robert B. Winkelman, an insurance broker.

For the at-large seat, ward leaders from across the city took part in the selection process. The Republicans selected James T. McDermott, a local lawyer who had previously served as an assistant U.S. attorney. Democrats decided on Walter S. Pytko, the executive director of the Philadelphia Parking Authority and a former state senator and ward leader. Pytko's nomination came as a surprise to many observers of the political scene, and his nomination was believed to be the choice of William J. Green Jr., the Democratic organization's chairman.

== Result ==
At the at-large race, Pytko easily defeated McDermott for the seat, winning by more than 140,000 votes in the citywide election, a reduced but still sizable majority compared with the 1959 at-large vote. In the 10th district, Winkleman retained the seat for his party, dispatching McDermott by more than 10,000 votes, but with a smaller percentage than McDevitt's 1959 total.

The one surprise result was in the 8th district as Smullen picked up the seat for the Republicans in what the Philadelphia Daily News called "a major upset." The results meant that the Democratic majority on the council was reduced to 13 to 3. All three races showed a roughly five percentage point increase in the Republican vote, in line with the increases in row office elections the previous year.

Philadelphia city council special election, at-large, 1962 (Note: Change is the change over the total at-large vote in 1959)
Party	Candidate	Votes	%	±%
Democratic	Walter S. Pytko	454,731	59.21	−5.19
Republican	James T. McDermott	313,268	40.79	+5.19

Philadelphia city council special election, district 8, 1962
Party	Candidate	Votes	%	±%
Republican	Stanley B. Smullen	34,084	52.42	+5.67
Democratic	John A. Geisz	30,943	47.58	−5.67

Philadelphia city council special election, district 10, 1962
Party	Candidate	Votes	%	±%
Democratic	Robert B. Winkelman (incumbent)	79,517	53.59	−4.93
Republican	Joseph Leo McGlynn Jr.	68,866	46.41	+4.93

== Aftermath ==
Pytko remained on city council until 1967, when he retired. His opponent, McDermott, ran for mayor in 1963, but was unsuccessful. He was appointed to a judgeship on the Pennsylvania Court of Common Pleas in 1967 and was elected to the Pennsylvania Supreme Court in 1981. He and Pytko in died the same week in June 1992.

Winkelman and Smullen both saw their election results reversed the following year when a Republican won the 10th district and a Democrat won the 8th. Smullen remained active at the ward level and in his business but, after an unsuccessful attempt at a state house seat in 1964, never ran for office again. Winkelman ran again in 1967 and for an at-large seat in 1971, but was unsuccessful. Both of their opponents later became judges: McGlynn on the federal bench and Geisz on the Court of Common Pleas.

== See also ==
- List of members of Philadelphia City Council since 1952

== Sources ==
- Bulletin Almanac 1960. Philadelphia, Pennsylvania: The Philadelphia Bulletin. 1960. OCLC 8641470.
- "McDevitt Enters Priesthood". The Philadelphia Inquirer. June 29, 1962. p. 1 – via Newspapers.com.
- "Smullen Choice in Council Race". The Philadelphia Inquirer. August 30, 1962. p. 4 – via Newspapers.com.
- "GOP Selects 2 in Council Races". The Philadelphia Inquirer. September 22, 1962. p. 5 – via Newspapers.com.
- "Pytko to Run for Council". The Philadelphia Inquirer. September 25, 1962. p. 6 – via Newspapers.com.
- Salgado, Robert J. (November 7, 1962). "GOP Captures Council Seat, Foes Take Two". The Philadelphia Inquirer. p. 2 – via Newspapers.com.
- Wundohl, Frank (November 7, 1962). "Council Seats to Republican, 2 Democrats". Philadelphia Daily News. pp. 4, 29 – via Newspapers.com.
- Bulletin Almanac 1963. Philadelphia, Pennsylvania: The Philadelphia Bulletin. 1963. OCLC 8641470.
- Goulden, Joseph C. (November 6, 1963). "Two Democrats Ousted, GOP Gains One Council Seat". The Philadelphia Inquirer. p. 5 – via Newspapers.com.
- Clancy, John F. (May 19, 1971). "Indorsed Candidates Sweep Council Races". The Philadelphia Inquirer. p. 6 – via Newspapers.com.
- "Victor E. Moore, 84, major figure in Phila. politics in '40s, '50s, '60s". The Philadelphia Inquirer. August 24, 1982. p. E-1 – via Newspapers.com.
- Colimore, Edward (July 20, 1986). "Alfred L. Luongo, 65, District Court judge". The Philadelphia Inquirer. p. 18-E – via Newspapers.com.
- Simmons, Rose (June 20, 1992). "Walter S. Pytko, longtime political leader". The Philadelphia Inquirer. p. A10 – via Newspapers.com.
- Ditzen, L. Stuart (June 23, 1992). "J.T. McDermott, a tough justice who had a soft spot for literature". The Philadelphia Inquirer. p. C7 – via Newspapers.com.
- "John A. Geisz, retired Phila. judge, 85". The Philadelphia Inquirer. December 28, 1998. p. R3 – via Newspapers.com.
- Slobodzian, Joseph A. (February 24, 1999). "Joseph McGlynn Jr., 74, federal judge". The Philadelphia Inquirer. p. B9 – via Newspapers.com.
