= Mary Varallo =

American politician

- Mary Varallo in 1964

Member of the Pennsylvania House of Representatives from the 5th district
- In office 1945–1946
- In office 1949–1960

Member of the Philadelphia City Council from the at-large district
- In office 1960–1967
- Preceded by: Henry W. Sawyer

Mary Frascone Varallo (June 11, 1897 – November 27, 1979) was a Democratic politician from Philadelphia who served in the Pennsylvania House of Representatives and the Philadelphia City Council.

Varallo was born Mary Frascone in South Philadelphia in 1897, the daughter of Italian immigrants Agostino and Caterina Frascone. She graduated from West Philadelphia High School and later took classes at Peirce School of Business, the Charles Morris Price School of Advertising and Journalism, Temple University, the Pennsylvania School of Criminology, and the Leefson-Hille Conservatory. After marrying in 1921 to Alfred Varallo, she worked as a church organist. She and Alfred were married until her death in 1979, but never had any children.

In addition to local Italian-American organizations, Varallo became involved in local Democratic Party politics in Philadelphia in the 1940s. She became the Democratic leader of the 36th ward in 1942 and was elected to the state House of Representatives in 1944, representing the multi-member 5th district along with Frank Lopez and former representative Anna M. Brancato. She sponsored a Woman's Equal Rights Bill that became law in 1945. The following election, in 1946, saw Republicans take back the three seats, but Varallo returned to the legislature in 1949 along with fellow Democrats Thomas Peta and Louis Amarando. Varallo won re-election for the next five terms. She served as chair of the House Welfare committee and, in 1959, became Minority Whip, the first woman to hold the position.

Later that year, the Philadelphia Democratic City Committee endorsed Varallo for an open at-large seat on the Philadelphia City Council and she won nomination easily in the May primary. In the general election that November, Varallo placed fourth among the five Democrats elected to the at-large seats. In an editorial, the Philadelphia Inquirer praised Varallo's election, calling her "capable," and noting that "unlike most of her fellow Philadelphia Democrats in the House, she is a worker." Council President James Tate assigned her to lead the Public Health Committee. Later that year, she was a delegate to the 1960 Democratic National Convention and was a presidential elector for John F. Kennedy. In 1963, Varallo was reelected, as were all of the other at-large members of City Council.

The election in 1967 saw a divide in the Philadelphia Democratic Party as Mayor Tate ran for nomination to a second term against the organization choice, Alexander Hemphill. The tumult from Tate's victory spilled over into council races, as Varallo lost the primary for a third term, as did fellow Democratic at-large incumbent Leon Kolankiewicz. In 1968, Varallo ran for Congress but lost a four-way primary to the incumbent Democrat, James A. Byrne. That same year she was considered among possible nominees to the post of Treasurer of the United States, but was not selected. With that, she retired from politics. Varallo died at Shore Memorial Hospital in Somers Point, New Jersey, on November 27, 1979, at the age of 82, and was buried at Holy Cross Cemetery in Yeadon, Pennsylvania.

== Sources ==
Books

- Bulletin Almanac 1960. Philadelphia, Pennsylvania: The Philadelphia Bulletin. 1960. OCLC 8641470.

Articles

- "1920 United States Federal Census, T625_1631, page 4A". Ancestry.com.
- "1930 United States Federal Census, T626, page 5B, FHL microfilm 2341854". Ancestry.com.
- Lush, Gerson R. (November 8, 1944). "Split Control Indicated in State Legislature". The Philadelphia Inquirer. p. 5 – via Newspapers.com.
- Lush, Gerson R. (November 6, 1946). "G.O.P Strengthens Grip on Penna. Legislature". The Philadelphia Inquirer. p. 3 – via Newspapers.com.
- "City Democrats Boost Assembly Bloc, 2 to 27". The Philadelphia Inquirer. November 3, 1948. p. 6 – via Newspapers.com.
- "Both Party Slates Sweep in Phila. As M'Bride is Snowed Under". The Philadelphia Inquirer. May 20, 1959. p. 4 – via Newspapers.com.
- "Two Women to Add Class to City Council". The Philadelphia Inquirer. December 18, 1959. p. 18 – via Newspapers.com.
- "Mrs. Varallo Heads Council's Health Committee". The Philadelphia Inquirer. January 26, 1960. p. 4 – via Newspapers.com.
- "Phila. Election at a Glance". The Philadelphia Inquirer. November 7, 1963. p. 5 – via Newspapers.com.
- Kohler, Saul (May 18, 1967). "Triumph by Tate Heralds Collapse of Smith Regime". The Philadelphia Inquirer. pp. 1, 4 – via Newspapers.com.
- "Mary F. Varallo, former legislator". The Philadelphia Inquirer. November 29, 1979. p. 7-D – via Newspapers.com.
- "Mary A. Varallo". Historical Biographies. Pennsylvania House of Representatives. 2018.
