= 1963 Philadelphia municipal election =

- November 5, 1963

The 1963 Philadelphia municipal election, held on November 5, involved contests for mayor, all seventeen city council seats, and several other executive and judicial offices. The Democrats lost vote share citywide and the Republicans gained one seat in City Council, but the Democratic acting mayor, James Tate, was elected to a full term and his party maintained their hold on the city government. The election was the first decline in the Democrats' share of the vote since they took control of the city government in the 1951 elections, and showed the growing tension between the reformers and ward bosses within their party.

== Background ==
Since the 1951 election, Democrats in Philadelphia had held the mayor's office and a large majority of city council seats. Their victories in those years, which followed 67 years of Republican dominance, where achieved through a combination of reform-minded independents (including some former Republicans) and the Democratic organization led by Democratic City Committee chairman William J. Green Jr. This coalition brought increasingly large victories to the Democratic Party throughout the 1950s.

This pattern held through 1959 under reform mayors Joseph S. Clark Jr. and Richardson Dilworth, but by the early 1960s the coalition had begun to fray with reformers being increasingly marginalized. After Dilworth won reelection with 65% of the vote in 1959, grand jury investigations into City Hall corruption damaged the Democrats' chances in the 1961 election. The Democrats maintained power that year, but by smaller margins. Their reduced majorities and increased association with machine politics signaled the beginning of the end for the party's coalition with independent good government reformers. Dilworth's resignation in 1962 to run for governor made City Council President James Tate acting mayor. While Tate presented, in one author's words, "a rather neutral image in middle class wards," he also was the first mayor since Bernard Samuel to have come up through the ranks of a political machine. The fading connection between the Democratic organization and good-government independents gave the Republicans their first hope for victory in years.

== Mayor ==
1963 Philadelphia mayoral election
- November 5, 1963
- Turnout: 75% ▲6 pp
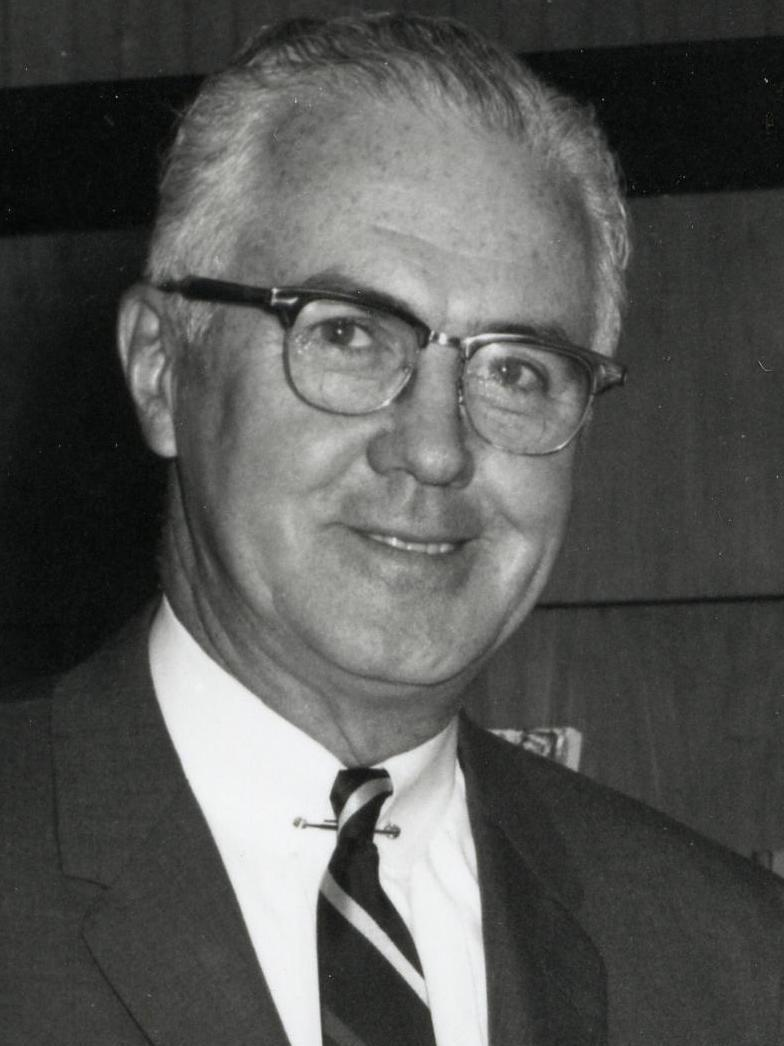

Nominee	James Tate	James T. McDermott
Party	Democratic	Republican
Popular vote	401,714	333,446
Percentage	54.64%	45.36%
- Results by ward Tate: 50–60% 60–70% 70–80% 80–90% McDermott: 40–50% 50–60% 60–70%
Mayor before election
James Tate
Democratic
Elected mayor
James Tate
Democratic

James Tate had served as acting mayor since Dilworth's resignation on February 12, 1962. In 1963, he sought the Democratic nomination for election in his own right. Tate's attempt at a four-year term exposed a growing breach in the coalition of independent reformers and Democratic ward bosses that had cemented that party's grip on the electorate since 1951. The Democratic City Committee, led by Representative William J. Green Jr., endorsed Tate, but the opinion was not universal. Former mayor Clark, now a United States Senator, endorsed the primary challenge by a slate of Democratic candidates proposed by the Americans for Democratic Action, a left-leaning group of which he was a member. For mayor, the ADA and Clark pushed Walter M. Phillips, a former city representative and one of the architects of the Democrats' reform measures of the early 1950s.

The contrast between Tate and Phillips was highlighted in the primary campaign. Tate, the self-made son of Irish-American factory workers, charged that Phillips saw government service as "a hobby" and claimed he was "too inexperienced and does not know enough to deal with the problems" of running a large city. Phillips in turn charged Tate with permitting corruption in city government, failing to improve schools, and driving out qualified city employees in favor of partisan patronage hires. In a low-turnout primary, the Democratic electorate sided with Tate, who tallied 128,840 votes to Phillips's 40,931 and perennial candidate H. Jerome Jaspan's 13,165. Tate's victory over Phillips, Clark later wrote, "marked the end of the 'independent' good-government influence in City Hall."

The Republican nomination was also easily won by the party organization's favored candidate, James T. McDermott. McDermott, who had lost a special election for city council in 1962, was a lawyer who had previously served as an assistant U.S. attorney. During the general election campaign, McDermott tried to take on the reform mantle, saying that Tate had worked to sabotage the good-government reforms of the Clark and Dilworth administrations. Tate, for his part, contrasted his experience with McDermott's and touted his endorsement by the AFL–CIO. McDermott said that Tate "has never been off the public payroll in twenty-five years" and criticized the mayor's refusal to debate him.

As the election neared, McDermott's attacks appeared to be working and political observers predicted a close race, possibly within 20,000 votes. While it was the closest race in years, the actual results were more solidly in favor of Tate, who won by nine percentage points. After a day of heavier-than-expected voter turnout, McDermott conceded that the mayor had won "fair and square." Tate thanked labor leaders, ex-Mayor Dilworth, and chairman Green for their efforts, while extending a special thanks to President John F. Kennedy, who campaigned for Tate the previous week. Although the campaign focused on issues of corruption and bossism, race also played a role; local black leaders, including Cecil B. Moore, strongly supported Tate and claimed that McDermott had "written off the Negro vote."

1963 Philadelphia mayoral election
Party	Candidate	Votes	%	±%
Democratic	James Tate (incumbent)	401,714	54.31	−11.03
Republican	James T. McDermott	333,446	45.08	+10.80
Socialist Labor	George S. Taylor	4,545	0.61	+0.23

== City Council ==
Philadelphians elected a seventeen-member city council in 1963, with ten members representing districts of the city, and the remaining seven being elected at-large. For the at-large seats, each political party could nominate five candidates, and voters could only vote for five, with the result being that the majority party could only take five of the seven seats, leaving two for the minority party.

As in the mayor's race, a group of ADA-endorsed Democrats tried for nominations to City Council. In the at-large races, all five incumbents—Paul D'Ortona, Leon Kolankiewicz, Walter S. Pytko, Marshall L. Shepard, and Mary Varallo—were endorsed by the party's ward leaders, while liberals led by Clark pushed the candidacies of Lynwood F. Blount, Gordon Cavanaugh, Edmund B. Spaeth Jr., and Joy B. Takiff. Eight Democrats affiliated with neither of those factions also entered the race. The incumbents won easily, with vote totals ranging from 105,382 for Shepard to 71,852 for Pytko. The highest vote total for the insurgents was Takiff's 32,665. Incumbent Democrats in the 2nd, 5th, 6th, 8th, and 10th districts also fended off primary challenges easily. The Republicans nominated five for the at-large seats without opposition, including incumbents Thomas M. Foglietta and Virginia Knauer. After the primary, Sheriff William M. Lennox denounced the challengers, calling the ADA "utterly repugnant to the people of this great historic city" and saying that "this self-proclaimed reform group should answer the questions on its 'Red China' allegiance which it evaded throughout the campaign."

In the at-large seats during the general election, as in the mayor's race, the Democratic share of the vote decreased but they still reelected all five of their candidates. Republicans reelected incumbents Thomas Foglietta and Virginia Knauer to their two at-large seats. In the district races, there was more change. Republicans defeated incumbent Democrats in the two seats representing Northeast Philadelphia in races that The Philadelphia Inquirer reporter Joseph C. Goulden said turned on City Hall corruption and civil rights issues. The Democrats gained one seat back in the northwestern part of the city when Isadore H. Bellis narrowly defeated incumbent Stanley B. Smullen in a recently reconfigured 8th district. Democrats retained their hold on the remaining seven district seats, though with reduced majorities.

At-large vote share by party
1. Democratic (56.1%)
2. Republican (43.9%)
3. Socialist Labor (0.07%)

1963 Philadelphia city council election, at large (Note: For Pytko, the change is the change over his special election victory in 1962.)
Party	Candidate	Votes	%	±%
Democratic	Paul D'Ortona (incumbent)	404,039	11.28	−1.69
Democratic	Marshall L. Shepard (incumbent)	402,386	11.24	−1.55
Democratic	Mary Varallo (incumbent)	401,386	11.21	−1.60
Democratic	Walter S. Pytko (incumbent)	400,057	11.17	−0.67
Democratic	Leon Kolankiewicz (incumbent)	399,790	11.16	−1.70
Republican	Thomas M. Foglietta (incumbent)	317,587	8.87	+1.55
Republican	Virginia Knauer (incumbent)	316,506	8.84	+1.70
Republican	Frank S. Loescher	313,639	8.76	n/a
Republican	Robert L. Leonard	313,627	8.76	n/a
Republican	Robert Evans	309,203	8.63	n/a
Socialist Labor	Wendell R. Camplin	2,726	0.07	−0.02

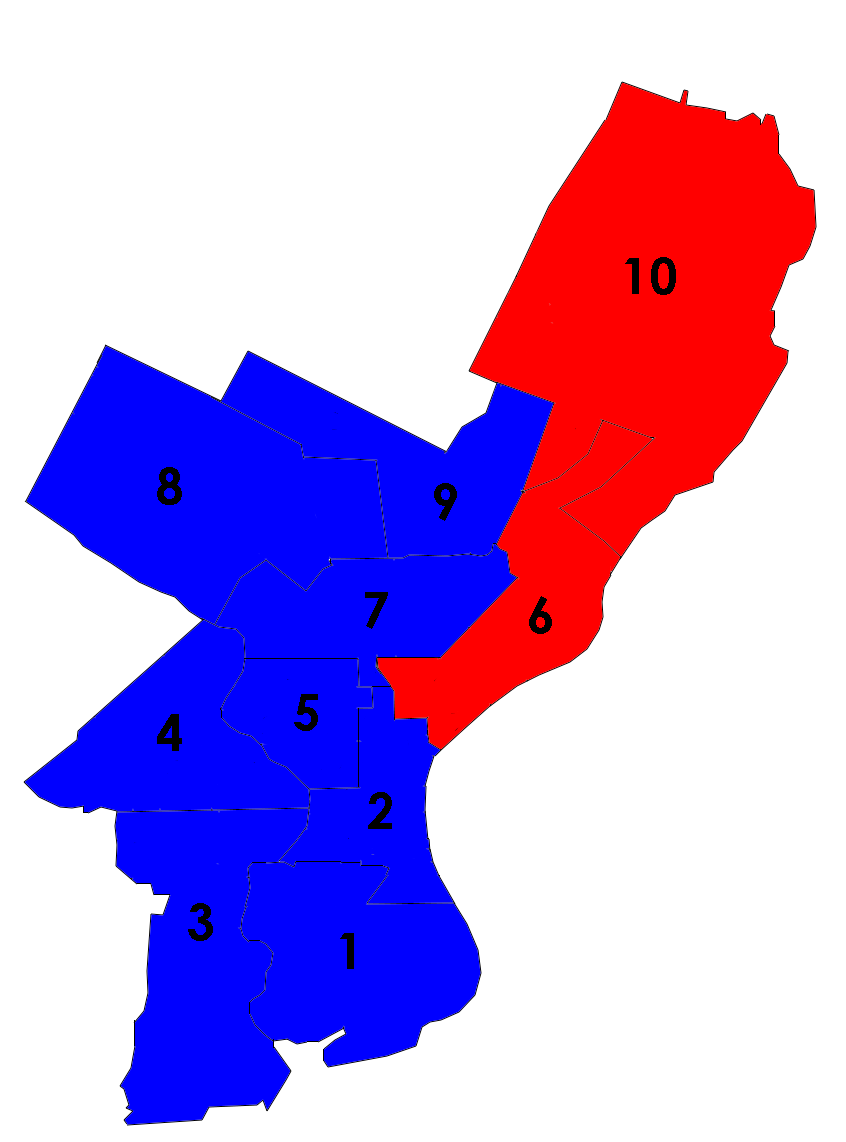
Philadelphia city council districts after the 1963 election (Democrats in blue, Republicans in red.)

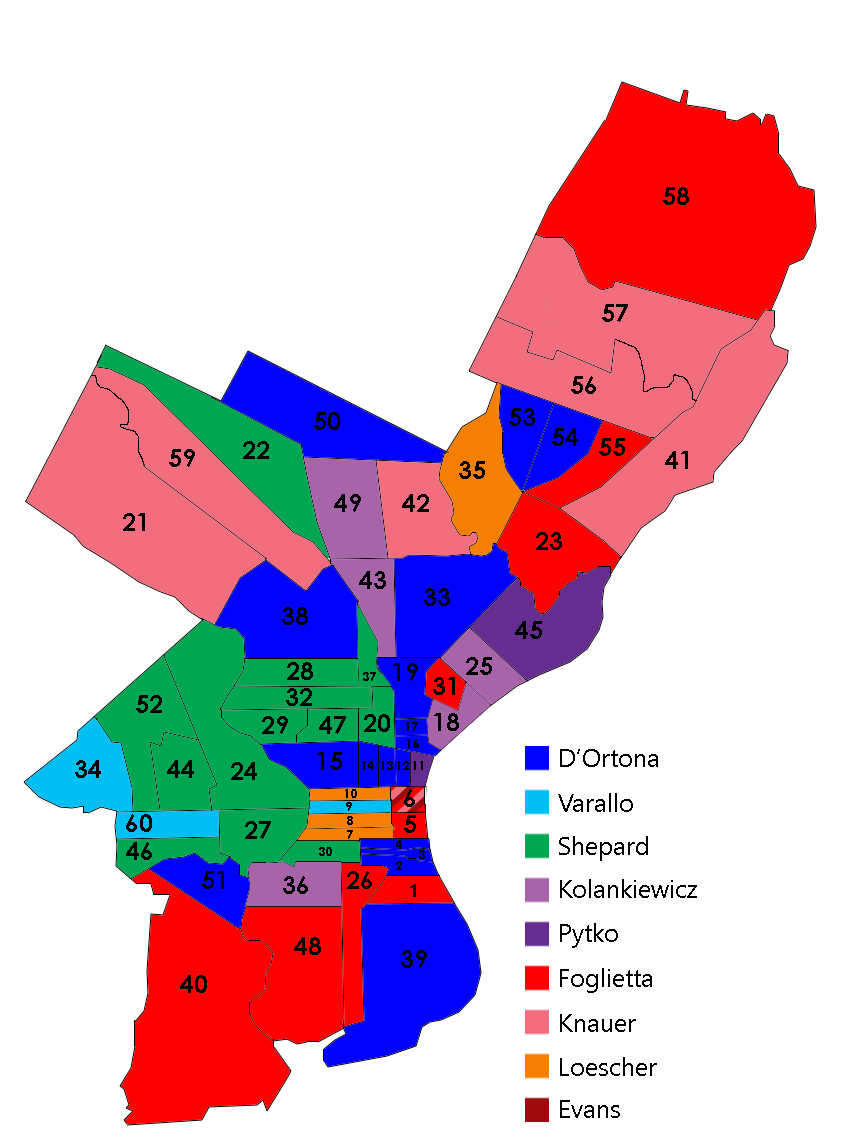
Most votes for council at-large candidate by ward, 1963

1963 Philadelphia city council election, district 1
Party	Candidate	Votes	%	±%
Democratic	Emanuel Weinberg (incumbent)	37,425	54.89	−11.46
Republican	Alvin J. Bello	30,751	45.11	+11.46

1963 Philadelphia city council election, district 2
Party	Candidate	Votes	%	±%
Democratic	Gaetano Giordano (incumbent)	36,456	56.78	−8.15
Republican	Robert Cruice	27,749	43.22	+8.15

1963 Philadelphia city council election, district 3
Party	Candidate	Votes	%	±%
Democratic	Harry Norwitch (incumbent)	40,574	60.51	−3.87
Republican	Mary Jane Ladner	26,479	39.49	+4.14

1963 Philadelphia city council election, district 4 (Note: Change is the change over his special election victory in 1960.)
Party	Candidate	Votes	%	±%
Democratic	George X. Schwartz (incumbent)	44,633	68.23	−7.21
Republican	Melvin J. Howell	20,782	31.77	+7.21

1963 Philadelphia city council election, district 5
Party	Candidate	Votes	%	±%
Democratic	Thomas McIntosh (incumbent)	34,742	75.27	−2.49
Republican	Andrew Wilson	11,416	24.73	+2.92

1963 Philadelphia city council election, district 6
Party	Candidate	Votes	%	±%
Republican	Edward F. McNulty	36,970	50.75	+16.43
Democratic	William A. Dwyer Jr. (incumbent)	35,872	49.25	−16.43

1963 Philadelphia city council election, district 7
Party	Candidate	Votes	%	±%
Democratic	Joseph J. Hersch	41,111	58.10	−8.78
Republican	Charles J. Margiotti Jr.	29,650	41.90	+8.78

1963 Philadelphia city council election, district 8 (Note: Change is the change over his special election victory in 1962.)
Party	Candidate	Votes	%	±%
Democratic	Isadore H. Bellis	40,454	50.74	+3.16
Republican	Stanley B. Smullen (incumbent)	39,273	49.26	−3.16

1963 Philadelphia city council election, district 9
Party	Candidate	Votes	%	±%
Democratic	Henry P. Carr (incumbent)	45,840	51.38	−15.44
Republican	Edward R. Becker	43,382	48.62	+15.44

1963 Philadelphia city council election, district 10
Party	Candidate	Votes	%	±%
Republican	David Silver	51,471	52.24	+5.83
Democratic	Robert B. Winkelman (incumbent)	47,054	47.76	−5.83

== City commissioners ==
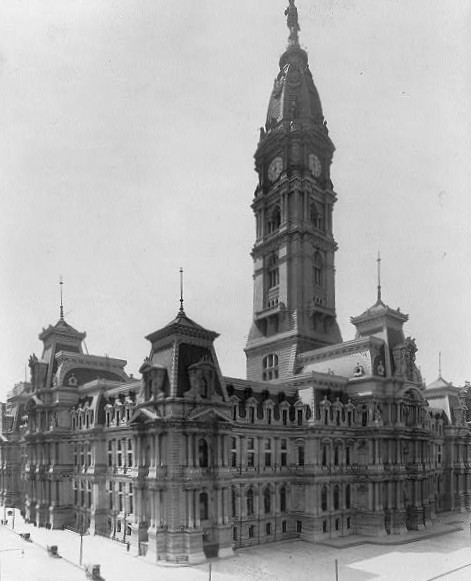
Philadelphia's City Hall

In the race for city commissioners, each party nominated two candidates and the top three were elected. The office was a county office, a holdover from the time before consolidation of the townships in Philadelphia County into one city. The most important of the remaining duties of the commissioners in Philadelphia was the conduct of the city's elections; they also had responsibility for regulating weights and measures.

Incumbent Democrats Thomas P. McHenry and Maurice S. Osser saw the same decline in their vote share as other Democrats did across the city, but held on to their seats on the city commission. Incumbent Republican Louis Menna edged out his running mate, Charles Wright, for the third seat. Two Socialist Labor Party candidates took a tiny share of the vote.

1963 Philadelphia city commissioners election
Party	Candidate	Votes	%	±%
Democratic	Thomas P. McHenry (incumbent)	403,373	27.99	−4.21
Democratic	Maurice S. Osser (incumbent)	403,270	27.98	−4.10
Republican	Louis Menna (incumbent)	317,143	22.01	+4.04
Republican	Charles Wright	311,330	21.60	+3.97
Socialist Labor	Benjamin H. Perry	3,054	0.21	+0.21
Socialist Labor	Mary Gesensway	2,985	0.21	+0.08

== Other offices and ballot measures ==
Democrat William M. Lennox was reelected county sheriff, his fourth consecutive term. Louis Amarando, also a Democrat, was reelected clerk of the court of quarter sessions (a court whose jurisdiction was later transferred to the court of common pleas). The Democratic register of wills, John E. Walsh Jr., also earned reelection. All three Democrats won their races by twelve or thirteen points, a decline from 1959, but still a safe majority. The Democrats also took nine of the fourteen magisterial district judge positions up for election that year (a local court, the duties of which have since been superseded by the Philadelphia Municipal Court) with incumbent Benjamin Segal leading the list.

The ballot contained three questions authorizing more city borrowing: the first for $20.2 million to spend on land and buildings, the second for $16.9 million to spend on water and sewage systems, and the third for $5 million to spend on the Philadelphia Gas Works. All three passed by greater than two-to-one margins.

Register of wills results by ward Walsh: 50%-60%; 60%-70%; 70%-80%; 80%-90%; Gartner: 50%-60%; 60%-70%

1963 Philadelphia sheriff election
Party	Candidate	Votes	%	±%
Democratic	William M. Lennox (incumbent)	406,202	56.32	−8.40
Republican	Charles J. Gazdzik	315,054	43.68	+8.40

1963 Philadelphia clerk of courts election
Party	Candidate	Votes	%	±%
Democratic	Louis Amarando (incumbent)	404,940	56.17	−8.63
Republican	Daniel Cooperman	316,026	43.83	+8.63

1963 Philadelphia register of wills election
Party	Candidate	Votes	%	±%
Democratic	John E. Walsh Jr. (incumbent)	406,163	56.39	−8.66
Republican	Fred C. Gartner	314,127	43.61	+8.66

== See also ==
- List of members of Philadelphia City Council since 1952

== Sources ==
=== Books ===
- Bulletin Almanac 1964. Philadelphia, Pennsylvania: The Philadelphia Bulletin. 1964. OCLC 8641470.
- Clark, Joseph S.; Clark, Dennis J. (1982). "Rally and Relapse: 1946–1968". In Weigley, Russell (ed.). Philadelphia: A 300-Year History. New York: W.W. Norton & Co. pp. 649–703. ISBN 978-0-393-01610-9.
- Freedman, Robert L. (1963). A Report on Politics in Philadelphia. Cambridge, Massachusetts: Joint Center for Urban Studies of the Massachusetts Institute of Technology and Harvard University. OCLC 1690059.
- Office of the City Representative (1962). Decade of Progress: The Story of Philadelphia, 1952–1961. Division of Public Information, Office of the City Representative. OCLC 11471789.
- Reichly, James (1959). The Art of Government: Reform and Organization Politics in Philadelphia. New York, New York: Fund for The Republic. OCLC 994205.

=== Newspapers ===
- "GOP Selects 2 in Council Races". The Philadelphia Inquirer. September 22, 1962. p. 5 – via Newspapers.com.
- Miller, Joseph H. (February 28, 1963a). "ADA Names Phillips for Mayor Race". The Philadelphia Inquirer. pp. 1, 42 – via Newspapers.com.
- "Tate Leaves, Foes Open Fire". The Philadelphia Inquirer. April 4, 1963. p. 1 – via Newspapers.com.
- "Green and Tate Assail Foes in Mayoralty Race". The Philadelphia Inquirer. May 16, 1963. p. 6 – via Newspapers.com.
- Miller, Joseph H. (May 22, 1963b). "Regulars Score Easy Victories". The Philadelphia Inquirer. pp. 1, 5 – via Newspapers.com.
- Miller, Joseph H. (May 23, 1963c). "Protest Votes Spur Democrats and GOP To Mend Party Rifts". The Philadelphia Inquirer. pp. 1, 4 – via Newspapers.com.
- Miller, Joseph H. (May 24, 1963d). "Democrats Declare War on ADA; Phillips to Fight Tate in Fall". The Philadelphia Inquirer. pp. 1, 12 – via Newspapers.com.
- Miller, Joseph H. (September 29, 1963e). "AFL-CIO Backs Tate; He's Called Saboteur". The Philadelphia Inquirer. p. 7 – via Newspapers.com.
- Miller, Joseph H. (November 3, 1963f). "Photo-Finish Predicted in Mayoralty Race Here". The Philadelphia Inquirer. p. 1 – via Newspapers.com.
- Miller, Joseph H. (November 6, 1963g). "Tate Elected by 66,000-Vote Margin". The Philadelphia Inquirer. pp. 1, 3 – via Newspapers.com.
- Goulden, Joseph C. (November 6, 1963). "2 Democrats Ousted, GOP Gains One Council Seat". The Philadelphia Inquirer. p. 5 – via Newspapers.com.
- "Phila. Election at a Glance". The Philadelphia Inquirer. November 7, 1963 – via Newspapers.com.
- Coakley, Michael B.; Wagenveld, Mark (May 28, 1983). "Tate Is Dead at 73". The Philadelphia Inquirer. pp. 1-A, 4-A – via Newspapers.com.

=== Journals ===
- Maciag, Mike (October 2014). "Voter Turnout Plummeting in Local Elections". Governing.
- McKenna, William J. (October 1965). "The Negro Vote in Philadelphia Elections". Pennsylvania History. 32 (4): 406–415. JSTOR 27770369.
