= Smullen =

Smullen is a surname. Notable people with the surname include:

- Pat Smullen (1977–2020), Irish jockey
- Stanley B. Smullen (1906–1998), American businessman
