= Robert B. Winkelman =

American politician

Robert Bernard Winkelman, Jr., (May 12, 1923 – September 20, 2007) was a Philadelphia businessman and Democratic politician who served on the Philadelphia City Council from 1962 to 1964.

Winkelman was born in Philadelphia in 1923, the son of Robert Winkelman, Sr., and his wife Nora Devitt Winkelman. He married Pauline Petraits, with whom he had three children. After serving in World War II, Winkelman entered the insurance business.

After City Councilman John M. McDevitt resigned his seat to enter the priesthood, Democratic ward leaders in Northeast Philadelphia's 10th district selected Winkelman to run for the seat in a 1962 special election. He was successful, retaining the seat for the Democrats and defeating Republican Joseph Leo McGlynn, Jr. After taking his seat, Winkelman was assigned to chair the Labor and Civil Service Committee.

Winkelman's term was just over a year, and Democratic primary voters backed him for the nomination to a full term in 1963 over challenger Arnold Lovitz. In the general election in November, however, he lost to Republican David Silver. He remained active in politics and ran again for council in 1967, losing in the primary despite support from the party hierarchy. After the death of Francis R. Smith in December 1967, Winkelman was elected to succeed him as leader of the 58th ward. In 1971, he was one of 57 candidates for the five Democratic nominations for city council at-large, but was unsuccessful. It marked his last foray into elected politics, and he died in 2007 at the age of 84.

== Sources ==
- "Social Security Applications and Claims Index, 1936-2007". Ancestry.com. National Archives and Records Administration. 2015.
- "Legislative, Council Races". The Philadelphia Inquirer. October 29, 1962. p. 3 – via Newspapers.com.
- Salgado, Robert J. (November 7, 1962). "GOP Captures Council Seat, Foes Take Two". The Philadelphia Inquirer. p. 2 – via Newspapers.com.
- "2 Newcomers To Head Council Units". The Philadelphia Inquirer. December 14, 1962. p. 7 – via Newspapers.com.
- "Disunity Costs Independents Council Chance". The Philadelphia Inquirer. May 23, 1963. p. 4 – via Newspapers.com.
- Goulden, Joseph C. (November 6, 1963). "Two Democrats Ousted, GOP Gains One Council Seat". The Philadelphia Inquirer. p. 5 – via Newspapers.com.
- Eady, James (May 18, 1967). "Tate Democrats Win Primaries for Council in 10th, 6th Districts". The Philadelphia Inquirer. p. 9 – via Newspapers.com.
- "Winkelman Named 58th Ward Leader". The Philadelphia Inquirer. December 28, 1967. p. 6 – via Newspapers.com.
- Clancy, John F. (May 19, 1971). "Indorsed Candidates Sweep Council Races". The Philadelphia Inquirer. p. 6 – via Newspapers.com.
- "Winkelman, Robert B., Jr". The Philadelphia Inquirer. September 23, 2007. p. B10 – via Newspapers.com.
