= Isadore H. Bellis =

American politician

Isadore Harry Bellis
- Isadore H. Bellis in 1964
- Born: Izsak Belostotsky; March 15, 1920; Yelisavetgrad, Soviet Union
- Died: May 29, 2003 (aged 83); Florida, United States of America
- Occupations: Tennis player, politician

Isadore Harry Bellis (born Izsak Belostotsky; March 15, 1920 – May 29, 2003) was a Democratic politician in Philadelphia. Known in his youth as a tennis star, he later became a successful lawyer and entered politics. He was elected to the Philadelphia City Council in 1963 and served there for three terms, rising to become majority leader in 1972.

In Bellis’s third term, allegations of corruption led to two convictions for bribery and malfeasance in office. He was defeated for a fourth term and retired to Florida, where he continued to appeal his convictions, never actually serving a day of his two-to-seven-year sentence. In 1984, the Pennsylvania Superior Court ordered that he be given a new trial, but the charges were dropped the following year as a main witness against him had died. Bellis died in Florida in 2003.

== Early life and tennis ==
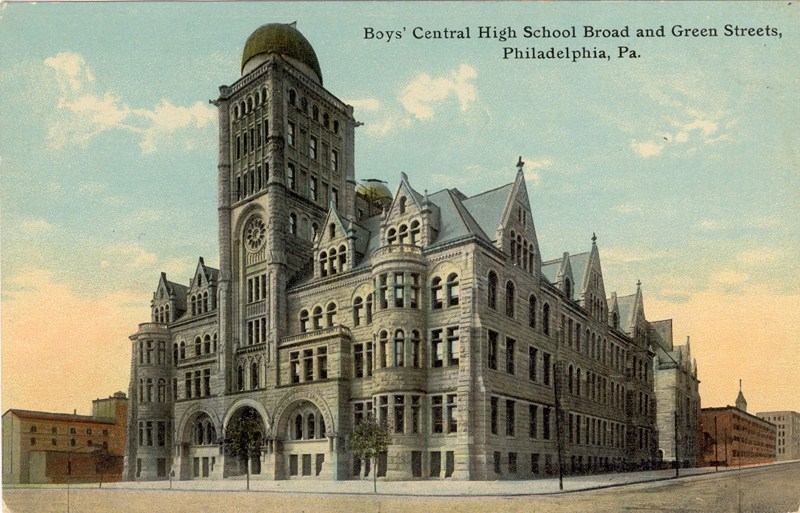
Bellis was a top tennis player at Philadelphia's Central High School.

Bellis was born in 1920 in Yelisavetgrad in the Soviet Union (now Kropyvnytskyi, Ukraine) to a Russian Jewish family, the son of Hersch Belostotsky and Rachel Levinsky Belostotsky. The family emigrated to the United States in 1923 and anglicized their surname from Belostotsky to Bellis. Bellis's father, now known as Harry Bellis, found work as a bank clerk in Philadelphia. Bellis learned to play tennis on the courts of Fairmount Park and attended Central High School. There, he became a top tennis player, winning the national boys outdoor championship in 1935 and the national boys indoor championship in 1936. He won the national boys doubles championship with partner Marvin Kantrowitz that same year. Bellis was also an outstanding table tennis player.

After high school, Bellis attended the University of Pennsylvania, where he was captain of the tennis team and continued to have success in the sport. He graduated in 1940 and played in the Pennsylvania Lawn Tennis Championships, an amateur tournament, where he was runner-up in 1940 and winner in 1941. He played in the U.S. National Championships, the predecessor to the US Open, in 1938, 1939, 1940, 1942, 1946, and 1948, but never advanced beyond the round of 32.

== Law, business, and politics ==
Bellis continued his education at the University of Pennsylvania Law School in 1942. He married Helen Koenigsberg while in school; they had three children—Arthur, Matthew, and Rachel—and would remain married until his death in 2003. With World War II raging, Bellis was drafted into the United States Army in August 1944, but was home again by December. He graduated from law school in 1945 and clerked for Justice Horace Stern of the Pennsylvania Supreme Court. While practicing law in Philadelphia for the firm of Bernstein & Bernstein, he also became involved with Democratic Party politics, becoming a committeeman in the 49th ward. Bellis ran for the Democratic nomination for Congress in 1952 in Pennsylvania's 6th district, but lost to Harrington Herr. He ran again in 1954, but dropped out shortly before the primary to endorse Alexander Hemphill. Bellis tried for the nomination once more in 1956, losing to Herbert J. McGlinchey, who had held the seat in the 1940s. A fourth try for the nomination in 1958 found Bellis finishing in a distant seventh place. In 1960, he was elected to a party position, chairman of the 49th Ward Democrats.

In 1956, he and Herbert F. Kolsby formed their own law firm, where his clients included the local branch of the Fraternal Order of Police. Lieutenant Governor John Morgan Davis joined the firm in 1959. In the early 1960s, Bellis joined a group of investors who formed a syndicate led by Barnard L. Sackett to distribute foreign films in the United States. He also served as a deputy state attorney general from 1958 to 1963.

== City Council ==
=== Slumlords, schools, and stadiums ===
In 1963, Bellis tried once more for political office, entering a crowded Democratic primary for the 8th district City Council seat, which covered the city's northwest region. This time, backed by the party organization, Bellis was nominated easily. In the general election that fall, he scored a narrow victory over the Republican incumbent, Stanley B. Smullen. Bellis's campaign had focused on the problem of slumlords, and in Council the next year he introduced a bill to increase the penalties for violations of the housing code. He also was a member of a City Council committee investigating and incident when a black police captain died after being refused admission to Philadelphia General Hospital in 1966. The question of a new, city-owned sports stadium was also hotly debated during Bellis's first term. He favored a domed stadium on a site on the Delaware River near Penn's Landing. The majority of councilmen disagreed, and the project eventually approved was the open-air Veterans Stadium in South Philadelphia. The Spectrum, a basketball and hockey arena, was also built on the site.

City Council redistricting moved Bellis's 49th ward to the 9th councilmanic district for the 1967 elections. After considering a run for mayor, he ran in his new district while the incumbent there, Henry P. Carr, entered the race for an at-large seat. He was unopposed in the primary but in the general election, Republicans put up their strongest challenge to the Democrats in years. Bellis managed another narrow victory, defeating his Republican opponent, law professor Martin Vinikoor, by just 1,047 votes out of a total of 81,701 total votes cast.

In the session of City Council that began in 1968, Bellis was named Democratic whip and chairman of the Law and Government Committee. That year, he clashed with school superintendent Mark Shedd over the district's plans to condemn homes in order to expand the Gen. David B. Birney School and Simon Gratz High School; the plans were eventually approved. He supported a plan to name a new high school in his district after Martin Luther King Jr., which was the name the school district eventually chose. The following year, debates over another school led to Bellis butting heads with School Board president (and former mayor) Richardson Dilworth. That year, he left his law firm to join a new one, which became known as Cohen, Bellis, and Verlin.

=== Bribery scandals ===
In 1969, Bellis testified before a grand jury investigating urban development corruption in the city, but was not charged with any crime. He testified again in 1970. One issue concerned an incident in which Bellis introduced a zoning variance in council for a planned restaurant in David Cohen's district, a breach of councilmanic prerogative that led to a fierce feud between the two Democrats. Cohen publicly alleged that Michael Grasso, a McDonald's franchisee, had bribed Bellis and Councilman William Cibotti to bring about the change in zoning. Grasso was the nephew of Philadelphia mob boss Angelo Bruno.

The controversy led to a primary challenge by insurance broker Daniel Zissman in the 1971 elections. Bellis won his primary easily, as did his fellow incumbents in a busy election. The general election was also not difficult, with Bellis defeating Republican Murray Dolfman by nearly two-to-one. After the election, he challenged George X. Schwartz for the job of President of City Council, but was outvoted and forced to be content with the position of majority leader.

Charges of influence-peddling followed Bellis into his third term in City Council. In 1973, District Attorney Arlen Specter launched an investigation into still more conflicts of interests, this time surrounding zoning changes for a housing development in Northeast Philadelphia in which Bellis had a concealed financial interest. A grand jury recommended his indictment for bribery in securing a no-bid contract for a concession at Philadelphia International Airport for ARA Services (a division of Aramark), accusing him of the "pursuit of private financial gain at the public expense." In addition to large campaign contributions, Bellis received ARA stock before agreeing to arrange the deal. Former councilman David Silver was also indicted by the same grand jury for similar offenses.

=== Trials ===
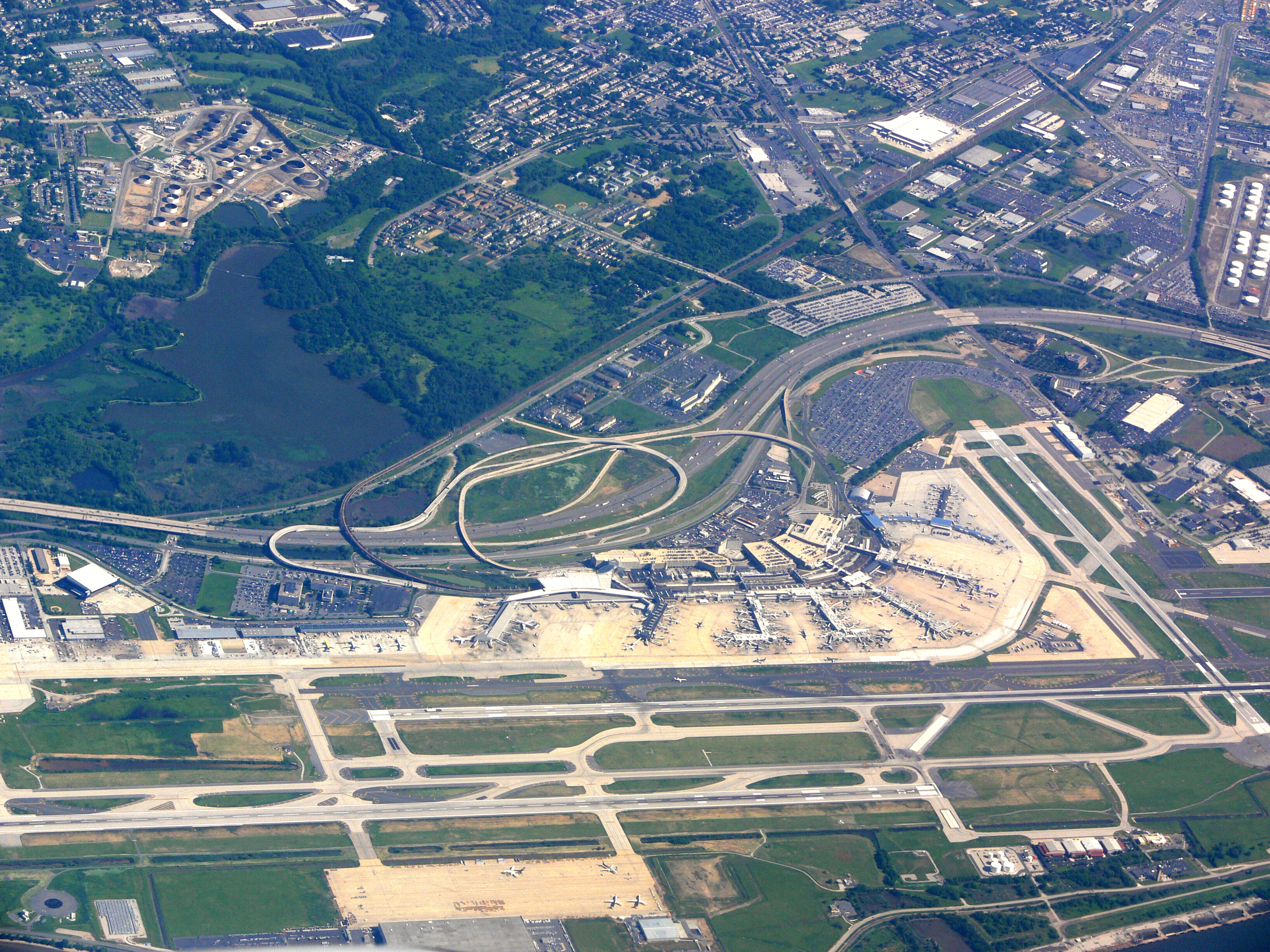
Concessions at Philadelphia International Airport (pictured) were at the heart of Bellis’s corruption trials.

Bellis claimed innocence and refused to resign from office. His constituents began a recall effort against him, which Mayor Frank Rizzo supported, but the City Commissioners invalidated the efforts after finding that it fell short of signature requirements. After a federal grand jury also began investigating the corruption, Bellis refused to surrender financial records from his former law firm, leading to contempt charges that he fought all the way to the Supreme Court. In 1974, the Court ruled in Bellis v. United States that the Fifth Amendment protections Bellis claimed did not extend to the firm's records. He was then indicted by the federal grand jury for tax evasion.

On July 26, 1974, Bellis was found guilty of bribery and malfeasance in office after a trial in Philadelphia Municipal Court. Bellis proclaimed himself "the victim of a political vendetta" by Specter and appealed for a new trial in Common Pleas Court. After pressure intensified, he resigned his majority leader post in September, but remained on City Council. In November of that year, he stood trial in U.S. District Court for the federal tax evasion charges, but was found not guilty.

Despite his pending trials, Bellis filed for reelection in 1975. The city Democratic organization backed his primary challenger, Louis Johanson, an attorney and protégé of former Mayor James Tate. On April 25, Bellis was found guilty of bribery, misconduct in office, and election law violations in Common Pleas Court, after which he took a leave of absence from City Council. He remained on the primary ballot, but stopped campaigning and lost to Johanson by a wide margin.

== Later life ==
Bellis was disbarred by the state Supreme Court, but federal charges for extortion were dropped in September 1975. The following year, a grand jury called for more charges on a different airport bribery scheme. Bellis was again found guilty. In October, he was finally sentenced for the 1975 conviction: he was given two years' probation and ordered to pay $9,000 in restitution. For the second verdict, he received a harsher sentence of two to seven years in prison, but remained free pending appeals. In 1980, the state Superior Court voided the conviction on the grounds that, since the jury had found him not guilty of extortion, they could not simultaneously find him guilty of lesser charges on those same facts. The state Supreme Court reversed that decision in 1981, reinstating Bellis's convictions.

Eight years after his second conviction, Bellis was living in Tamarac, Florida, and still had not served any of his two to seven-year sentence. In yet another appeal in 1984, the Superior Court ruled that the trial judge had improperly instructed the jury in Bellis's 1976 case and ordered that he receive a new trial. The following year, Philadelphia District Attorney Ed Rendell dropped the charges rather than retry Bellis, noting that the length of time since the underlying offense and the death of a key witness would make it nearly impossible to convict.

No longer facing any jail time, Bellis requested a pardon for his first conviction in 1990, but was turned down by the Pennsylvania Board of Pardons. He petitioned the city several times to restore his pension, but to no avail. On May 29, 2003, he died in Florida at the age of 83.

== Sources ==
Books

- Bulletin Almanac 1964. Philadelphia, Pennsylvania: The Philadelphia Bulletin. 1964. OCLC 8641470.
- Bulletin Almanac 1968. Philadelphia, Pennsylvania: The Philadelphia Bulletin. 1968. OCLC 8641470.
- Bulletin Almanac 1972. Philadelphia, Pennsylvania: The Philadelphia Bulletin. 1972. OCLC 8641470.
- Birker, Paul Arthur (2005). Veterans Stadium; Field of Memories. Philadelphia: Temple University Press. ISBN 1-59213-428-9.
- Levy, Henry W. (1939). "Athletics". In Landman, Issac (ed.). The Universal Jewish Encyclopedia: An Authoritative and Popular Presentation of Jews and Judaism Since the Earliest Times. Vol. 1. New York: The Universal Jewish Encyclopedia, Inc. pp. 595–596.
- Schiff, Sol (1939). Table Tennis Comes of Age. H. Holt. ISBN 1-59213-428-9.

Newspapers

- "Bellis Defeats Hirsch, 6-1, 6-3, Clinching Tennis Finals Berth". The Daily Pennsylvanian. October 18, 1939. p. 17.
- "Bellis Beats Hunt for Tennis Title". The Philadelphia Inquirer. June 17, 1941. p. 22 – via Newspapers.com.
- "Draft gets Isadore Bellis, Quaker City Tennis Luminary". The Times-Tribune. Scranton, Pennsylvania. August 16, 1944. p. 15 – via Newspapers.com.
- "Burns Wins Over Brown in W. Phila. Congress race as GOP Ward Leaders Split". The Philadelphia Inquirer. April 23, 1952. p. 2 – via Newspapers.com.
- "Bellis Drops out of Congress Race". The Philadelphia Inquirer. May 11, 1954. p. 2 – via Newspapers.com.
- "Party-Supported Men Victors in Congress Races". The Philadelphia Inquirer. April 25, 1956. p. 4 – via Newspapers.com.
- "Tabulation of Vote Cast Here for Candidates in Primary Election". The Philadelphia Inquirer. May 22, 1958. p. 5 – via Newspapers.com.
- "Lieut. Gov. Davis to Re-Enter Law Practice". The Daily American. Somerset, Pennsylvania. January 6, 1959. p. 8 – via Newspapers.com.
- "FOP Submits Proposal to Let Selves Solicit". The Philadelphia Inquirer. June 26, 1959. p. 25 – via Newspapers.com.
- Williams, Edgar (May 7, 1961). "Movie and Money". The Philadelphia Inquirer Magazine. p. 27 – via Newspapers.com.
- "Disunity Costs Independents Council Chance". The Philadelphia Inquirer. May 23, 1963. p. 4 – via Newspapers.com.
- Bellinger, Harry (November 6, 1963). "GOP Adds New Voice To Council". Philadelphia Daily News. p. 4 – via Newspapers.com.
- "New Councilman Aims at Slumlords". Philadelphia Daily News. January 24, 1964. p. 14 – via Newspapers.com.
- "Bellis Wants Issues Aired in the 8th District". The Philadelphia Inquirer. January 30, 1964. pp. 1, 5 – via Newspapers.com.
- Feist, William (September 20, 1966). "D'Ortona Announces New Council Districts, Cites Dissatisfaction". The Philadelphia Inquirer. p. 33 – via Newspapers.com.
- "PGH Probe Sets Public Hearings". The Philadelphia Inquirer. January 21, 1967. p. 17 – via Newspapers.com.
- "Bellis Files for Re-Election". The Philadelphia Inquirer. February 24, 1967. p. 5 – via Newspapers.com.
- "Bellis Continues battle for Riverfront Stadium Complex". Philadelphia Daily News. May 8, 1967. p. 16 – via Newspapers.com.
- Lordan, Francis M. (January 26, 1968). "Council's Freshmen Yield in Rules Fight; 13 Chairmen Named". The Philadelphia Inquirer. p. 6 – via Newspapers.com.
- "New Meeting Set on Birney School Expansion". The Philadelphia Inquirer. March 7, 1968. p. 58 – via Newspapers.com.
- Umansky, David J. (May 26, 1968). "School Name Battled at Awbury-Nolan Site". The Philadelphia Inquirer. p. NW-1 – via Newspapers.com.
- Umansky, David J. (March 4, 1969). "Bellis Blasts Dilworth for Attack on Council". The Philadelphia Inquirer. p. 35 – via Newspapers.com.
- Trachtman, Joseph H.; McAdams, Leonard J. (August 26, 1969). "First Councilman to Testify Today in Urban Inquiry". The Philadelphia Inquirer. p. 1 – via Newspapers.com.
- Fensterer, Robert (July 2, 1970). "Drive-In Planning to Join Opposition". The Philadelphia Inquirer. p. 17 – via Newspapers.com.
- "Bellis to be Opposed by Insurance Broker in Spring Primary". The Philadelphia Inquirer. December 27, 1970. p. 15 – via Newspapers.com.
- Campisi, Gloria (May 19, 1971). "Organization Demos Take Council Races". Philadelphia Daily News. p. 23 – via Newspapers.com.
- Lame, Anthony (January 25, 1973a). "Second Zoning 'Conflict' Case in Council is Revealed". The Philadelphia Inquirer. p. 1-D – via Newspapers.com.
- Lame, Anthony; Goldsmith, Phillip R. (May 17, 1973). "Jury Urges Indictment of Bellis for Bribery". The Philadelphia Inquirer. pp. 1-A, 2-A – via Newspapers.com.
- Lame, Anthony (March 8, 1973b). "Bellis Got ARA Stock Before Arranging 'Deal'". The Philadelphia Inquirer. p. 3-B – via Newspapers.com.
- Katz, Jon (April 4, 1973). "Rizzo Backs Recall of Councilman Bellis". The Philadelphia Inquirer. p. 1-A – via Newspapers.com.
- Hamilton, Fred (May 15, 1973). "Bellis Recall Petition Thrown Out". Philadelphia Daily News. p. 3 – via Newspapers.com.
- Lame, Anthony (May 17, 1973c). "Bellis Faces First Setback in Long, Uphill Climb". The Philadelphia Inquirer. p. 1-A – via Newspapers.com.
- Goldsmith, Phillip R. (July 12, 1973). "Silver is Indicted on Perjury Count". The Philadelphia Inquirer. pp. 1-A, 2-A – via Newspapers.com.
- Associated Press (July 2, 1974). "Bellis Indicted by Jury". The Philadelphia Inquirer. p. 1-A – via Newspapers.com.
- Jablow, Paul (July 27, 1974). "Bellis Guilty; He'll Seek a New Trial". The Philadelphia Inquirer. pp. 1-A, 2-A – via Newspapers.com.
- Stalberg, Zachary (September 25, 1974). "Bellis Quits Majority Leadership". Philadelphia Daily News. p. 3 – via Newspapers.com.
- Duff, Elizabeth (November 14, 1974). "Bellis Found Not Guilty". The Philadelphia Inquirer. pp. 1-A, 2-A – via Newspapers.com.
- Stalberg, Zachary (March 11, 1975). "Bellis Vows Tough Fight". Philadelphia Daily News. p. 11 – via Newspapers.com.
- Leary, Mike (April 26, 1975). "Bellis Is Guilty In Bribe Case". The Philadelphia Inquirer. pp. 1-A, 2-A – via Newspapers.com.
- "Bellis Craved the 'Top', Never Made It". The Philadelphia Inquirer. April 26, 1975. p. B-1 – via Newspapers.com.
- Towarnicky, Carol (May 21, 1975). "8 Rizzo allies Win In District Races". Philadelphia Daily News. p. 7 – via Newspapers.com.
- "Isadore Bellis Has Extrotion Counts Killed". Wilmington Evening Journal. September 23, 1975. p. 30 – via Newspapers.com.
- "Bellis faces New Charge After Extort Rap's Dropped". Philadelphia Daily News. May 4, 1976a. p. 22 – via Newspapers.com.
- Racher, Dave (July 29, 1976). "Bellis Guilty, He'll Appeal". Philadelphia Daily News. p. 7 – via Newspapers.com.
- "Bellis Back in Court for 2nd Sentence". Philadelphia Daily News. October 7, 1976b. p. 3 – via Newspapers.com.
- Neumann, Jonathan (September 29, 1977). "Bellis Gets 2-7 Years In Bribe Case". The Philadelphia Inquirer. pp. 1-A, 2-A – via Newspapers.com.
- Biddle, Daniel R. (December 25, 1981). "Court Lets Stand Bellis' Conviction". The Philadelphia Inquirer. pp. 1-A, 10-A – via Newspapers.com.
- Anastasia, George (February 1, 1983). "A sentence does not a jail term make". The Philadelphia Inquirer. pp. 1-B, 2-B – via Newspapers.com.
- Cooney, Tom (January 23, 1984). "Superior Court Orders New Trial For Ex-Councilman Bellis". Philadelphia Daily News. p. 8 – via Newspapers.com.
- Associated Press (October 5, 1985). "Corruption charges dropped against Phila. councilman". The [Allentown] Morning Call. p. 14 – via Newspapers.com.
- Eshleman, Russell E. (May 17, 1990). "Bellis loses in quest for pardon". The Philadelphia Inquirer. pp. 1-B, 4-B – via Newspapers.com.
- McCoy, Craig R. (January 16, 1993). "Ex-councilman Bellis again denied pension". The Philadelphia Inquirer. p. B3 – via Newspapers.com.
- "Bellis". South Florida Sun Sentinel. May 30, 2003. p. 7B – via Newspapers.com.

Websites

- "1930 United States Federal Census, T626, page 19A". Ancestry.com.
- "Social Security Applications and Claims Index, 1936-2007". Ancestry.com.
- "Department of Veterans Affairs BIRLS Death File, 1850-2010". Ancestry.com.
- "Pennsylvania, Federal Naturalization Records, 1795-1931". Ancestry.com.
- "Isadore Bellis". ATP Tour.
