= John McDevitt =

John McDevitt may refer to:

- John W. McDevitt, Supreme Knight of the Knights of Columbus
- John M. McDevitt, American politician, later a Roman Catholic priest and educator

== See also ==
- Jack McDevitt, American science fiction author
