= Walter S. Pytko =

American politician (1901-1992)

Member of the Philadelphia City Council At-Large
- In office 1962–1968
- Preceded by: Victor Moore
- Succeeded by: Edgar C. Campbell Sr.

Member of the Pennsylvania State Senate
- In office 1935–1938
- Constituency: 8th district

Personal details
- Born: Walter Stanley Pytko; January 16, 1901 Philadelphia, Pennsylvania, U.S.
- Died: June 17, 1992 (aged 91) Philadelphia, Pennsylvania, U.S.
- Resting place: Most Holy Redeemer Cemetery
- Party: Democratic
- Spouse: Helen Stachowiak (m. 1926)
- Children: 1
- Education: Temple University

Walter Stanley Pytko (January 16, 1901 – June 17, 1992) was an American politician who served in the Pennsylvania State Senate in the 1930s and as an at-large member of the Philadelphia City Council from 1962 to 1968. A member of the Democratic Party, he was active in Polish-American organizations in Philadelphia's Bridesburg neighborhood and worked for various government agencies during the 1940s and 1950s. He retired from the City Council in 1968.

== Family and education ==
Pytko was born in 1901 in Philadelphia, the son of Polish immigrants Francis M. Pytko and Anna Borsuta Pytko. He grew up in Philadelphia's Port Richmond neighborhood and graduated from Roman Catholic High School. After high school, Pytko earned degrees from Temple University and Temple Law School. He was active in Polish-American groups in Philadelphia, joining the staff of the Polish Beneficial Association in 1922 and organizing the Polish-American Citizens League, a political group, in 1925. He also operated a real estate and insurance business. He married Helen Stachowiak around 1926, with whom he had one daughter, also named Helen. They remained married until her death in 1956.

== Political career ==
=== State senate ===
Representing the Polish-American Citizens League, Pytko joined a group of neighborhood leaders in endorsing the mayoral candidacy of Republican J. Hampton Moore in 1931. By 1932, he had moved to the Bridesburg neighborhood, switched his party allegiance, and was elected the Democratic leader of the 45th ward. He was nominated by the Democrats to run for state senate in the 8th district. He won, defeating Republican John J. McKinley by 64,406 to 57,394, picking up the seat for the Democrats. He was the first Polish-American elected to that body. Soon after joining the Senate, Pytko introduced a bill making it a crime to fraudulently receive poor relief, which passed unanimously.

In 1936, he served as a presidential elector for Franklin D. Roosevelt, who won a second term in office. The following year, he helped draft a bill to create a state housing agency that would have the power to conduct "slum clearances" and supervise the local authorities that construct public housing, including the Philadelphia Housing Authority. He was re-nominated for the senate in 1938, but lost to Republican Louis H. Farrell by a vote of 79,985 to 71,266.

=== Administrative agencies ===
Following his defeat, Pytko was named to the newly created Employment Board of the Department of Public Assistance by outgoing Democratic Governor George Howard Earle III. Earle's successor, Republican Arthur James, recalled the last-minute appointments, and the state senate agreed to nullify them, including Pytko's appointment. He ran for sheriff of Philadelphia later that year, but withdrew in favor of former U.S. Attorney Gerald A. Gleeson, who lost to Republican David E. Watson. Meanwhile, Pytko helped organize relief for Poland as World War II ravaged that country.

In December 1939, state auditor general Warren R. Roberts appointed Pytko to the Board of Mercantile Appraisers, a part of the taxation bureaucracy of the state. He traveled to the 1940 Democratic National Convention in Chicago as a member of the Pennsylvania delegation. The Pennsylvania delegates united on the choice of Roosevelt for a third term, but split over the vice presidency, with Pytko unsuccessfully backing Governor Lloyd C. Stark of Missouri. The Board of Mercantile Appraisers was abolished in 1943, its functions transferred to the State Department of Revenue. Starting in 1945, Pytko worked as the administrative assistant to state treasurer Ramsey S. Black. In 1947, the Democrats nominated him for Receiver of Taxes, but he lost to Republican W. Frank Marshall in the general election that year.

Republican Governor James H. Duff, against the wishes of his own party members in Philadelphia, appointed Pytko to a spot on the Philadelphia Board of Registration Commissioners in 1949, filling a vacancy left by the death of another Democrat, Michael R. Kerwick. The appointment maintained the partisan balance on the Board, which was in charge of voter registration. Pytko served alongside Victor E. Moore, whom he would one day succeed on City Council. (The Registration Commission's duties were transferred to the City Commissioners in 1965). That same year, he resigned as head of the 45th ward.

In 1951, the city adopted a new charter and the Democrats won the mayoral and council elections for the first time in decades. One of the charter changes involved the creation of a Department of Licenses and Inspections, and newly elected mayor Joseph S. Clark Jr. appointed Pytko to head it. Pytko pledged stricter enforcement, saying that "Any inspector who takes a bribe or accepts money not only will be dismissed but also will be prosecuted." Three months later, he dismissed ten such inspectors. The following year, Pytko concentrated his department's efforts on tenements that did not meet health and safety requirements. By 1955, his department had expanded and now employed 96 inspectors. He gained a reputation for honesty; according to Philadelphia Inquirer reporter Saul Schraga, Pytko became known as "the man who wouldn't do a favor." Schraga quoted one city politico as saying Pytko "wouldn't let his own mother get by without a permit." After five years at Licenses and Inspections, Pytko resigned to become the executive director of the Philadelphia Parking Authority.

=== City council ===
In 1962, Victor Moore resigned from his at-large seat on City Council, necessitating a special election later that year. Democratic ward leaders decided on Pytko. The nomination came as a surprise to many observers of the political scene, and his nomination was believed to be the choice of William J. Green Jr., the Democratic organization's chairman. Pytko easily defeated his Republican opponent, James T. McDermott, for the seat, winning by more than 140,000 votes in the citywide election, a reduced but still sizable majority compared with the 1959 at-large vote. On Council, Pytko chaired the Committee on Public Works and Public Property.

In the 1963 elections, Pytko won a full term on the Council, placing fourth among the five Democratic candidates who were elected. In December of that year, he introduced the resolution that renamed Municipal Stadium in South Philadelphia after President John F. Kennedy, who had been assassinated a month earlier. Pytko clashed with mayor James Tate in 1964, accusing the mayor of creating unnecessary jobs in the city bureaucracy. In 1965, he focused on air pollution, calling for stricter enforcement of the city's regulation of industrial sites.

== Retirement ==
In March 1967, Pytko announced that he would not seek re-election to city council, and would instead "now watch the parade go by." He enjoyed a quiet retirement in Bridesburg until his death in 1992 at the age of 91. After a funeral at St. John Cantius Roman Catholic Church, he was buried in Most Holy Redeemer Cemetery in Bridesburg.

== Sources ==
Books

- Bulletin Almanac 1963. Philadelphia, Pennsylvania: The Philadelphia Bulletin. 1963. OCLC 8641470.
- Bulletin Almanac 1964. Philadelphia, Pennsylvania: The Philadelphia Bulletin. 1964. OCLC 8641470.
- Bolek, Francis (1970). Who's Who in Polish America. New York: Harbinger House. ISBN 9780405005459. OCLC 484050939.

Newspapers

- Cummings, John M. (September 9, 1931). "Waters to Have Vare Support in Coming Fight". The Philadelphia Inquirer. pp. 1, 12 – via Newspapers.com.
- Cummings, John M. (May 16, 1934a). "Reed Beats Pinchot, Schnader Nominated". The Philadelphia Inquirer. pp. 1, 13 – via Newspapers.com.
- Cummings, John M. (November 7, 1934b). "Reed Beaten as Schnader Lags in Vote". The Philadelphia Inquirer. pp. 1, 11 – via Newspapers.com.
- "Relief Head Hit as 'Weak Sister'". The Philadelphia Inquirer. April 30, 1935. p. 10 – via Newspapers.com.
- "Presidential Electors to Cast Vote for Roosevelt Tomorrow". The Philadelphia Inquirer. December 13, 1936. p. 11 – via Newspapers.com.
- Miller, Joseph H. (February 1, 1937). "Assembly to Get Slum Clearance Program Tonight". The Philadelphia Inquirer. pp. 1, 11 – via Newspapers.com.
- "City Vote for State Senate". The Philadelphia Inquirer. November 9, 1938. p. 15 – via Newspapers.com.
- "Earle Reappoints Relief Board". The Philadelphia Inquirer. December 3, 1938. p. 5 – via Newspapers.com.
- "Earle's Appointments Nullified By Senate; Hundreds Are Ousted". The Philadelphia Inquirer. January 19, 1939. p. 4 – via Newspapers.com.
- Miller, Joseph H. (November 8, 1939). "7 Row Offices Retained in Vote Setting New High". The Philadelphia Inquirer. pp. 1, 13 – via Newspapers.com.
- "Hart and Pytko Named Mercantile Appraisers". The Philadelphia Inquirer. December 16, 1939. p. 4 – via Newspapers.com.
- Miller, Joseph H. (July 19, 1940). "Penna. Casts 72 Votes For Roosevelt But 2d-Place Split Looms". The Philadelphia Inquirer. p. 6 – via Newspapers.com.
- Miller, Joseph H. (July 10, 1947). "Democrats Pick Pytko for Receiver of Taxes". The Philadelphia Inquirer. p. 10 – via Newspapers.com.
- "Vote By Ward For Row Offices". The Philadelphia Inquirer. November 5, 1947. p. 4 – via Newspapers.com.
- "Duff Names Democrat to Registration Board". The Philadelphia Inquirer. April 14, 1949. p. 6 – via Newspapers.com.
- "Pytko Appointed Head of Licenses". The Philadelphia Inquirer. January 3, 1952. pp. 1, 13 – via Newspapers.com.
- "Pytko to War on 57,000 Tenements". The Philadelphia Inquirer. January 13, 1953. p. 10 – via Newspapers.com.
- "Pytko Increases Inspection Staff". The Philadelphia Inquirer. February 10, 1955. p. 11 – via Newspapers.com.
- Schraga, Saul (January 10, 1957). "Pytko Resigns License Board for Parking Job". The Philadelphia Inquirer. p. 17 – via Newspapers.com.
- "Pytko to Run for Council". The Philadelphia Inquirer. September 25, 1962. p. 6 – via Newspapers.com.
- "Bill Nullifying Land Swap Set For OK Dec. 19". The Philadelphia Inquirer. December 6, 1963. p. 39 – via Newspapers.com.
- "Legal Battle Brewing Over Registry Board; Mayor Rebukes Pytko". The Philadelphia Inquirer. December 31, 1964. p. 17 – via Newspapers.com.
- "Pytko Accuses Air Pollution Board of Failure to Put Contracts Into Effect". The Philadelphia Inquirer. April 29, 1965. p. 11 – via Newspapers.com.
- "GOP Snub Challenged in 6th District Race by Councilman McNulty". The Philadelphia Inquirer. March 9, 1967. p. 53 – via Newspapers.com.
- Simmons, Rose (June 20, 1992). "Walter S. Pytko, longtime political leader". The Philadelphia Inquirer. p. A10 – via Newspapers.com.

Websites

- "1920 United States Federal Census, T625_1637, page 7A". Ancestry.com.
- "Registration Commission". Philadelphia Information Locator Service. City of Philadelphia. 2000.
