= Joseph Leo McGlynn Jr. =

American judge (1925–1999)

Senior Judge of the United States District Court for the Eastern District of Pennsylvania
- In office February 14, 1990 – February 23, 1999

Judge of the United States District Court for the Eastern District of Pennsylvania
- In office March 8, 1974 – February 14, 1990
- Appointed by: Richard Nixon
- Preceded by: Thomas Ambrose Masterson
- Succeeded by: Harvey Bartle III

Personal details
- Born: Joseph Leo McGlynn Jr. February 13, 1925 Philadelphia, Pennsylvania
- Died: February 23, 1999 (aged 74) Cancún, Mexico
- Party: Republican
- Education: Mount St. Mary's College (B.S.); University of Pennsylvania Law School (LL.B.)

Joseph Leo McGlynn Jr. (February 13, 1925 – February 23, 1999) was a United States district judge of the United States District Court for the Eastern District of Pennsylvania.

== Education and career ==
Born in Philadelphia, Pennsylvania, McGlynn saw action in the United States Navy during World War II, serving from 1943 to 1946. Returning from military duty, he attended Mount St. Mary's College in Emmitsburg, Maryland, receiving a Bachelor of Science degree in 1948 and a Bachelor of Laws from the University of Pennsylvania Law School in Philadelphia in 1951. He was an Assistant United States Attorney in Philadelphia from 1953 to 1960. He worked in private practice in Philadelphia from 1960 to 1965. In 1962, he ran in a special election as a Republican to represent the 10th district on Philadelphia City Council, but lost to Robert B. Winkelman. McGlynn was a judge of the County Court of Philadelphia from 1965 to 1968 and a judge of the Court of Common Pleas for the First District of Pennsylvania from 1968 to 1974.

== Federal judicial service ==
McGlynn was nominated by President Richard Nixon on January 31, 1974, to a seat on the United States District Court for the Eastern District of Pennsylvania vacated by Judge Thomas Ambrose Masterson. He was confirmed by the United States Senate on March 1, 1974, and received his commission on March 8, 1974. He assumed senior status on February 14, 1990. His service terminated on February 23, 1999, due to his death in Cancún, Mexico.

== Sources ==
Legal offices
Preceded by Thomas Ambrose Masterson	Judge of the United States District Court for the Eastern District of Pennsylvania; 1974–1990	Succeeded by Harvey Bartle III
