= Sexual abuse scandal in the Roman Catholic Archdiocese of Philadelphia =

Sexual abuse cases in the United States

The sexual abuse scandal in the Catholic Archdiocese of Philadelphia is a significant episode in the series of Catholic sex abuse cases in the United States during the late 20th century and the early 21st century. The Archdiocese of Philadelphia includes the City of Philadelphia and several counties in southeastern Pennsylvania.

Over the past 25 years, three grand juries have investigated sexual abuse by clergy in the archdiocese. The 2003 and 2005 grand juries revealed the extent of the problem in the archdiocese. They explained how archbishops and other officials would remove offending priests from parishes, send them for treatment and then reassign them to new parishes. Law enforcement and parishioners were not informed of the records of these priests. The 2011 grand jury found 37 priests with credible allegations of sexual abuse. It indicted three priests and one teacher for child abuse offenses. A diocesan official was also indicted for his coverups of abuse by priests, but after two trials he pleaded guilty to a lesser offense.

As of 2025, 13 priests and one archdiocesan school teacher have been convicted of possessing child pornography, rape, and other sexual abuse crimes. Their sentences ranged from probation to 20 years in prison. Many other priests were not prosecuted, but had credible accusations of sexual abuse. The victims, both boys and girls, ranged from ages nine to 16; many of them were altar servers and choir members. Many of the offending clerices had collections of child pornography; they assaulted the children in rectories, churches, private homes and church offices. Some victims were abused just once, while others were abused continually over months and years.

After receiving hundreds of sexual abuse claims and lawsuits during the early 21st century, the archdiocese in 2018 spent $81 million to compensate 438 sexual abuse victims.

== 2003 grand jury ==
With the onset of the major sexual abuse scandals in the Archdioceses of Boston and New York, along with the growing number of civil and criminal cases in the Archdiocese of Philadelphia, Philadelphia District Attorney Lynne Abraham began an investigation in Philadelphia in early 2002. In March 2002, the archdiocese released a statement that only 35 priests over the past 52 years had credible accusations of sexual abuse. In the summer of 2002, Cardinal Anthony Bevilacqua, then archbishop of Philadelphia, stated in an interview that he never transferred a priest with a credible accusations of sexual abuse from one parish to another.

Abraham empaneled her grand jury in September 2002. Based on the recent statements from the archdiocese, Abraham and the grand jury expected to uncover only a few cases. Instead of a few cases, the 2003 grand jury found 120 cases. However, it was unable to make any indictments. The grand jury published an 18-page report that determined:

- Bevilacqua had indeed transferred priests with allegations of sexual abuse to prevent a scandal.
- William Lynn, then in charge of priest personnel, hid crimes committed by priests and transferred them to other parishes. Lynn testified that the archdiocese would only report sexual abuse crimes to the police if the victim complained to them directly. If the parent of a child reported abuse, the archdiocese would not notify police.
- the archdiocese was more focused on hiding the wrongdoing of priests than of protecting children from them.
- the archdiocese would not notify parishes about sexual abuse crimes or allegations of crimes against their priests.

Due to the limitations on its time and the number of cases to investigate, the 2003 grand jury was forced to eventually transfer its investigation to a second grand jury. In July 2003, Archbishop Justin Francis Rigali of the Archdiocese of St. Louis was appointed by Pope John Paul II as the next archbishop of Philadelphia.

== 2005 grand jury ==
=== Report ===
To continue the work of the 2003 grand jury, Abraham empaneled a second grand jury the next year. That grand jury released its final report on September 21, 2005. The report found that Cardinal John Krol, archbishop of Philadelphia from 1961 to 1988, was guilty, along with Bevilacqua, of covering up sexual abuse crimes by priests in the archdiocese.

The report criticized the actions of Auxiliary Bishop Joseph R. Cistone, serving in 1996 as assistant vicar for administration. It claimed that Cistone was involved with silencing a nun who tried to alert parishioners at St. Gabriel parish about abuse by a priest. There were several other instances of priest sexual abuse which Cistone was complicit in covering up. The report also indicated that Cistone was most concerned with the public relations ramifications of the sexual abuse. On one occasion, a sexual abuse victim asked Cistone to set up a meeting with Bevilacqua, Cistone refused, saying that such a meeting would "set a precedent".

Using records subpoenaed from the archdiocese, the jury examined the so-called "secret archive" files for 169 priests and two deacons. It documented 63 examples of abuse by clergy. The grand jury also stated that nobody could be indicted due to the Pennsylvania statute of limitations on sexual abuse crimes and other conditions that protect the archdiocese from being criminally accountable.

=== Response by archdiocese ===
Rigali criticized the 2005 report, calling it slanted. He said that it did not reflect policy changes that the archdiocese had made, including the education of children about safe relationships and the reporting of sexual abuse allegations to police, Regarding Bevilacqua and Krol, Rigali said that "Mistakes are one thing. Intentions are another."

Cistone expressed sorrow for "any mistakes in judgment." However, he refused to discuss the matter further, saying, "[I]t would not serve any purpose to revisit the grand jury report and endeavor to recall the rationale for past decisions made in specific cases." Cistone in 2009 said, "Unfortunately, the grand jury procedure, as followed in Philadelphia, did not allow for any opportunity to address such questions to offer explanation or clarification."

"In 2006, the archdiocese hired Mary Achilles, the state's first victim advocate, to review its treatment of victims after a 2005 grand jury report highlighted abuse by more than 50 priests over 50 years." Achilles, among other involvements in the field, has worked on the subject of restorative justice with Professor Howard Zehr of Eastern Mennonite University.

== 2011 grand jury ==
=== Report ===
A third grand jury, in February 2011, accused the archdiocese, still under Rigali, of failing to stop the sexual abuse of children. The report said that up to 37 priests had been credibly accused of sexual abuse or inappropriate behavior toward minors. Unlike the 2003 and 2005 grand juries, the 2011 grand jury handed down five indictments:

- Edward Averape – indecent sexual assault
- Robert Brennan – sexual assault
- Charles Engelhardt – orally sodomizing and molesting
- Bernard Shero – rape, attempted rape, involuntary deviant sexual intercourse and indecent sexual assault.
- William Lynn – two counts of endangering the welfare of a child

=== Response by archdiocese ===
Rigali initially said in February 2011 that "there were no active priests with substantiated allegations against them, but six days later, he placed three of the priests, whose activities had been described in detail by the grand jury, on administrative leave. He also hired an outside lawyer, Gina Maisto Smith, a former assistant district attorney, to re-examine all cases involving priests in active ministry and review the procedures employed by the archdiocese."

In March 2011, Rigali invited Catholics to a special Stations of the Cross penitential service at the Cathedral Basilica of Saints Peter and Paul in Philadelphia. The purpose of the service, he wrote in his Lenten letter, was 'the forgiveness of all sins and reconciliation with God and in the community.'

The 2011 grand jury found that "archdiocesan officials ignored all of Achilles' initial recommendations" ... Rigali hired Achilles again last week to perform the same service," according to one report. District Attorney R. Seth Williams said he respected Rigali's choice of Smith to lead the case review.

In July 2011, Pope Benedict XVI accepted Rigali's resignation as archbishop of Philadelphia. At that time, Rigali said that he "...offered an apology 'if I have offended' and 'for any weaknesses on my part'. However, he failed to see any connection between the scandal and the Vatican accepting his resignation. The pope named Archbishop Charles J. Chaput of the Archdiocese of Denver to succeed Rigali.

=== Media reaction to report ===
David J. O'Brien, who teaches Catholic history at the University of Dayton in Dayton, Ohio, stated in March 2011, "The situation in Philadelphia is Boston reborn."

Maureen Dowd in The New York Times, concluded in March 2011,

"Out of the church's many unpleasant confrontations with modernity, this is the starkest. It's tragically past time to send the message that priests can't do anything they want and hide their sins behind special privilege."

In April 2011, Richard McBrien, writing for the National Catholic Reporter (NCR) drew attention to Rigali's failure to live up to the Charter for the Protection of Children and Young People, approved in 2002 by the US Conference of Catholic Bishops. McBrien stated that Rigali had

"made an unfortunate mistake in fundamental logic by making a universal negative assertion that could be rebutted by even a single case to the contrary ... [by] denying the allegation that there were other abusive priests still at work in the Archdiocese ... [when] [s]oon thereafter he removed twenty-one priests."

In July 2011, Robert Huber at Philadelphia magazine published a 7,630-word article which opened with Rigali's question "Is it true?" about the 2011 grand jury report. It moved on to ask "Will the Catholic Church as we know it survive in Philadelphia?" The piece concluded with a critique from the archdiocese which began: "Unfortunately for Philadelphia magazine readers looking for honest, in-depth reporting, this piece is an agenda-driven travesty of salacious innuendo masquerading as journalism."

== William Lynn ==
One of the most prominent sexual abuse cases in the 2010s was that of William Lynn, who served as the Secretary of the Clergy for the archdiocese from 1993 to 2004. Lynn was never accused of sexually abusing any children; however, he would be indicted on charges of covering up the sexual abuse crimes of priests that he was supervising. The 2003 grand jury investigation of the archdiocese named Lynn as one of the church officials who ignored or covered up sexual abuse crimes by priests. The follow-up grand jury in 2005 specifically singled out Lynn for his repeated efforts to keep Robert L. Brennan working in parishes. Brennan abused multiple boys in four parishes.

In February 2011, Lynn was indicted on two counts on endangering the welfare of a child by the third grand jury investigating the archdiocese. At that time, he was serving as pastor of St. Joseph Church in Downingtown. The indictment stated that Lynn failed to stop three priests and a teacher from raping two boys during the 1990s. The three other priests (Charles Engelhardt, Edward Avery and Robert Brennan) and the teacher (Bernard Shero) were indicted at the same time. Lynn maintained that he was innocent.

The first victim was Danny Gallagher, who was 10-years old-when he claimed to have been first sexually assaulted by Engelhardt, then by Avery and Shero. The second victim was Sean McIlmail, whom Brennan sexually abused when the boy was 14-years-old. Lynn was aware of the allegations against all four men, but did not notify police or their parishes, and worked to cover-up their actions. Before the start of his trial, Avery pleaded guilty in March 2012 to conspiracy and sexually assault; he was sentenced to two and a half to five years in state prison.

Lynn went on trial in late March 2012. The jury heard testimony from McIlmail, Gallagher, and Lynn among others In June, 2012, Lynn was convicted of one of two child endangerment charges, and acquitted of a single count of conspiracy. He was sentenced to three to six years in prison. Criminal charges against Brennan were dropped after McIlmail died of a heroin overdose in 2013. Shero was convicted of multiple charges in 2013 and was sentenced to eight to 16 years in prison.

In December 2013, a three-judge panel of the Pennsylvania Superior Court overturned Lynn's conviction. The court stated that Lynn was not legally responsible for the abuses committed by priests under his supervision. He was released from prison. In April 2015, the Pennsylvania Supreme Court reinstated Lynn's conviction. Lynn returned to prison that month.

In December 2015, the Pennsylvania Superior Court vacated Lynn's conviction and ordered a new trial. Lynn was again released from prison. The court ruled that Lynn's trial judge allowed excessive testimony in the trial about extraneous sexual abuse cases, creating prejudice among the jurors. In July 2016, the Pennsylvania Supreme Court affirmed the Superior Court ruling. In August 2016, the court set May 2017 as the date for Lynn's new trial.

In January 2016, Newsweek Magazine obtained a psychiatric report on Gallagher that cast serious doubt on his value as a witness. He admitted that some of his testimony was untrue.

In March 2020, Lynn's second trial was set to begin. Due to concerns about the reliability of Gallagher as a witness, the sole charge was one count of child endangerment. The trial was delayed due to the COVID-19 pandemic. Lynn in December 2022 pleaded no contest to a misdemeanor charge of failing to turn over records to the 2003 grand jury. No further charges or punishment were imposed on Lynn.

== Legal reforms ==
In April 2012, The Philadelphia Inquirer publish an editorial on the need for reform of laws governing civil sexual abuse cases:

"Harrisburg lawmakers need to act on proposals still being fought by the state's Catholic bishops — most vocally by Philadelphia Archbishop Charles J. Chaput — that would waive civil statutes for a brief period to allow those victims to seek justice. As done in Delaware and California, a so-called "civil window" would further expose the abusers' dirty secrets and help lead to healing in the church, and beyond. State legislators need not await a jury verdict to do the right thing by abuse victims."

In August 2018, Pennsylvania Attorney General Josh Shapiro published a grand jury report on sexual abuse cases in six of the dioceses in the state (excluding the archdiocese).

On November 26, 2019, Pennsylvania Tom Wolf signed into law legislation that significantly reformed the state's child sex abuse statute. The new law abolishes Pennsylvania's criminal statute of limitations on childhood sexual abuse and extends the timeline victims have to file civil action against their abusers; clarifies penalties for failure to report child abuse; makes conversations with law enforcement agents exempt from non-disclosure agreements; and creates a fund for victims of sexual abuse to pay for abuse-related therapy.

== 2018–present ==
The archdiocese in November 2018 initiated the Independent Reconciliation and Reparations Program (IRRP) to assist victims of sexual abuse. It was run by an independent board with no control by the archdiocese. By the time the IRRP ended in 2019, 623 individuals had submitted claims and 438 victims had been approved. The average payout was $179,144 per person, with a total amount paid to be $81 million. On May 5, 2020, the archdiocese announced that it now expected to pay $126 million in settlements. The archdiocese also said the IRRP has received a total of 615 claims, and had settled 208 of them for $43.8 million as of April 22, 2020. The same day, however, the total amount of money which the archdiocese expected to pay in sex abuse settlements was revised to $130 million by new Archbishop Nelson J. Perez.

In December 2019, Archbishop Chaput suspended Joseph L. Logrip, then chaplain at Camilla Hall, as being unsuitable for ministry. The archdiocese had received a report from an individual who claimed that Logrip sexually abused them as a child during the 1980s.

== Prominent civil suits ==
=== John Close ===
A young man sued the archdiocese in 2019, saying that he had been raped as a 14-year-old by Close in 2006. The plaintiff was attending a religious school at a church in the Philadelphia suburbs where Close was pastor. After attacking the victim in his office, Close told him that he would “suffer eternal damnation” if he told anyone about it. Close died in 2018, The archdiocese had investigated two previous accusations against Close, but had determined that they were not credible. In August 2023, the archdiocese settled the lawsuit for $3.5 million.

=== Francis S. Feret ===
In 2006, a man reported to the archdiocese that Feret had sexually assaulted him during the 1970s when he was age nine. Feret had served as pastor of St. Adalbert Parish in Port Richmond and as an administrator at Cardinal Dougherty High School in Philadelphia before retirement.

=== John E. Gillespie ===
In 1994, two brothers confronted Gillespie and accused him of sexually abusing them at Immaculate Conception Parish in Levittown during the 1950s. Gillespie forwarded their accusations to Lynn, denying that the abuse happened. There was no investigation. In 1997, a mother complained to the archdiocese about Gillespie asking her son sexual questions during confession. Lynn refused to investigate the allegations. In 2000, after a man stated that Gillespie fondled him as a teenager during the 1970s, the archdiocese removed Gillespie from his assignment at Our Lady of Calvary Church in Philadelphia.

In March 2011, the archdiocese was sued by Philip Gaughan, who said he was sexually abused by Gillespie when he was pastor of Our Lady. The alleged abuse happened 1994 and 1997, when Gaughan was a teenage sacristan at the church. Gillespie died in 2008. After Gaughan filed his lawsuit, other alleged victims of Gillespie contacted him. The archdiocese said that Gaughan's lawsuit should be dismissed because it was past the Pennsylvania statute of limitations. In 2015, the Pennsylvania Superior Court upheld the lower court ruling that the case should be dismissed. The cutoff date for his lawsuit would have been 2000.

=== John P. Schmeer and Francis X. Trauger ===
Michael W.McDonnell said that in the late 1970s and early 1980s, he was abused by John P. Schmeer and the now-laicized Francis X. Trauger of St. Titus parish and school near Norristown. The eight earlier lawsuits involved different victims. Trauger was arrested on September 3, 2019.

=== Robert L. Brennan ===
In June 1988, Brennan was named pastor of Saint Ignatius Parish in Yardley. Almost immediately John C. Marine, then assistant pastor there, noticed Brennan kissing and hugging the boys; he also heard from other staff that some boys were spending the night with him. Brennan notified the diocese, but its officials, including Lynn. After a complaint from the mother of one boy, the archdiocese sent Brennan for an psychological evaluation in November 1988. Bevilacqua offered the boy's parents to pay for his counseling.

After several months of treatment, Bevilacqua appointed Brennan as parochial administrator, then pastor, of St. Mary's Parish in Schwenksville. The new parish was not told about Brennan's background. In March 1991, seven fifth graders complained to their principal at the parish school about Brennan. The principal made a report that eventually reached Bevilacqua, who did nothing. In July 1992, after more complaints from school officials and parents, the archdiocese sent Brennan away again for evaluation. Lynn in November 1993 recommended that Brennan be assigned as assistant pastor at Resurrection of Our Lord Parish in Philadelphia. However, his therapists warned against him receiving a new pastoral position.

Brennan remained at Resurrection for the next ten years, repeating all of his previous behaviors. The pastor of the parish refused to hear any complaints about him until 1996. when he finally met with Lynn. In 2004, Brennan was transferred to serve as chaplain at Camilla Hall, a retirement home for religious sisters in Malvern.

In 2013, a lawsuit was filed by the parents of Sean McIlmail, who had said that Brennan molested him between 1998 and 2001, starting when he was 11, while Brennan served at Resurrection of Our Lord. Criminal charges which were filed against Brennan prior to the lawsuit were dropped after McIlmail committed suicide in 2013 at the age of 26. On June 25, 2018, it was announced that the Philadelphia Archdiocese agreed to settle the lawsuit. The exact sum of the lawsuit's settlement remained undisclosed, but nevertheless was reported to be the largest sex abuse settlement in the history of the archdiocese. On September 5, 2019, Brennan was arrested at his home in Maryland after being indicted on four counts of lying to the FBI about molesting McIlmail.

=== John McDevitt ===
In 2009, the Oblates of St. Francis de Sales, a religious order for men, was sued in Delaware for sexual abuse. The plaintiff was Richard Green, who claimed that he was sexually abused by John M. McDevitt, an Oblates priest who was teaching religion at Father Judge High School in Philadelphia. The abuse took place between 1990 and 1991 when Green was 14-years-old. McDevitt died in 1999. McDevitt threatened to fail Green if he did not accede to his sexual advances. The abuse happened during tutoring sessions, with Green being subjected to anal penetration, oral sex and other forms of abuse.

It was reported at that time that the Oblates Order was also being sued by men who had been abused as teenagers by McDevitt at the Salesianum School in Wilmington, Delaware. There was also a report from the Diocese of Harrisburg of McDevitt kissing a boy there. The Oblates in 2011 announced a $24.8 million financial settlement with victims of sexual abuse by their priests. This settlement included Richard Green.

== Sexual abuse convictions ==
The following priests in the Archdiocese of Philadelphia were convicted in American courts of sexual abuse crimes against minors. Bernard Shero, the only non-priest on this list, was a teacher employed by the archdiocese.

=== Edward Avery ===
In 1995, Avery was reported to the archdiocese for improper behavior with young boys. He was wrestling, tickling and sleeping with them. The archdiocese sent him away for treatment. After his discharge, the archdiocese was supposed to keep him away from children. However, Cardinal Bevilacqua assigned him to St. Jerome's Parish in Philadelphia. While at St. Jerome, Charles Engelhardt in 1999 introduced him to Danny Gallagher. Gallagher was a 10-year-old boy at the parish school whom Engelhardt had been sexually assaulting for the past year. Avery would engage in oral intercourse with Gallagher on several occasions.

The archdiocese in December 2003 permanently removed Avery from ministry. The Vatican laicized him in 2006. In February 2011, Avery was charged with rape, indecent sexual assault and other criminal charges. Before the start of his trial, Avery pleaded guilty in March 2012 to conspiracy and sexually assault; he was sentenced to two and a half to five years in state prison. Avery in January 2013 recanted his confession, claiming that he never abused Gallagher.

=== James J. Behan ===
Behan in 2002 was pastor of Immaculate Conception Church in Wilmington, North Carolina, when Martin Donohoe accused him of sexual abuse in Philadelphia. The Diocese of Charlotte immediately suspended Behan from public ministry. Donahoe said that Behan entered into a sexual relationship with him when he was 14-year-old boy at North Catholic High School in Philadelphia. Donahoe reported ending the relationship in 1981.

Behan was indicted in Philadelphia in April 2004 on charges of rape, involuntary deviate sexual intercourse, and indecent assault. He pleaded guilty in February 2005 to sexually abusing Donahoe. In a decision that stunned many observers due to its leniency, the judge sentenced Behan in December 2005 to 12 years of probation.

=== Richard J. Cochrane ===
In August 1999, Cochrane, a teacher at Malvern Preparatory School in Malvern, Pennsylvania, was charged with sexual assault. The victim, then a student at Malvern, said that Cochrane sexually assaulted him in June 1991 at a house in Tobyhanna. Cochrane showed a pornographic film to the victim, gave him beer, fondled him and then performed a sexual act on him. A second victim made similar accusations against Cochrane, but the case was too old to prosecute Cochrane in January 2003 pleaded no contest to sexual assault. He was sentenced in July 2003 to one and a half to two years in state prison.

=== Edward M. DePaoli ===
In 1985, U.S. Postal Inspectors searched DePaoli's room at the rectory of Holy Martyrs Parish in Oreland. They discovered 111 magazines, 14 8mm films, and 11 videotapes of child pornography. He was convicted of one count of possessing child pornography and received a one-year suspended sentence. The archdiocese sent him to St. John Vianney Hospital in Downington, where he remained for two years. After his discharge, the archdiocese returned him first to a parish in New Jersey, then to parish work in Philadelphia.

In 2002, a woman complained to the archdiocese that DePaoli had sexually molested her in 1970 when she was 14-years-old. At that point, the archdiocese removed him from ministry permanently. DePaoli was laicized by the Vatican in 2004.

=== Charles Engelhardt ===
Engelhardt, a pastor at St. Joseph Parish in Philadelphia, was arrested in February 2011 on charges of orally sodomizing and molesting a 10-year-old altar boy in 1998, Danny Gallagher. Engelhardt gave him wine, showed him pornographic films, then assaulted him. Engelhardt later told Edward Avery about Gallagher, who then proceeded to abuse him also. In 2009, Gallagher reported his abuse to two social workers from the archdiocese. In June 2013 trial, Engelhardt was convicted of rape. He was sentenced to six to 12 years in prison and five years of probation. Engelhardt died in November 2014 while in prison

=== Armand Garcia ===
On March 5, 2019, Garcia, pastor of Saint Martin of Tours Parish in Oxford Circle, was arrested and charged with rape and sexual abuse. The victim was a 16-year-old girl in 2014, a parishioner at Immaculate Heart of Mary Parish in Roxborough. Garcia filmed the girl during the crime. In October 2023, Garcia pleaded guilty to corruption of minors and unlawful contact with minors as part of a plea agreement.

=== Mark J. Haynes ===
In October 2014 Haynes, a priest at Saints Simon and Jude Parish in Westtown, was arrested on charges of possessing and disseminating child pornography. The National Center for Missing and Exploited Children had alerted police to the parish Instagram account. The site showed two nude pictures of a girl under age 14. They later discovered other pornographic photos and that he was actively catfishing with a minor girl. In June 2015, Haynes pleaded guilty to solicitation and child pornography charges. He was sentenced in February 2016 to 20 years in state prison.

=== Robert J. Hermley ===
Hermley was first arrested in Wilmington, Delaware, in 1982 when police discovered him in a parked car with two young teenage boys watching pornographic films. After his conviction, the court sentenced him to three years of probation. After a mental health examination at Johns Hopkins Hospital, doctors cleared him for service. A member of the Oblates Order, they assigned Hermley next to a parish in Vienna, Virginia. The Oblates received a sexual abuse complaint against him in 1987 from his assignment at Our Lady of Perpetual Help Parish in Seaside Heights, New Jersey, during the 1970s.

In 2003, a man contacted the archdiocese to allege that Hermley sexually abused him at Father Judge High School in Philadelphia during the 1970s. In 2011, Hermley's victims were included in the $23.6 million financial settlement by the Oblates for sexual abuse lawsuits.

=== Matthew J. Kornacki ===
Secret Service agents in 2003 searched Kornacki's quarters at St. Charles Borromeo Seminary in Philadelphia, where they found over 150 child pornography images on his laptop. At that time, he was serving as assistant director for priest formation and a spiritual director at St. Charles. In August 2004, he pleaded guilty without a plea agreement to possessing child pornography in federal court. Kornacki was sentenced in November 2004 to 30 months in federal prison.

=== Nilo C. Martins ===
Martins was a Brazilian pediatrician who was also a priest in the Society of the Divine Word, a religious order. His order in 1984 had assigned him as an assistant pastor at Incarnation of Our Lord Parish in North Philadelphia. In February 1985, Martins invited "Daniel", a 15-year-old altar boy, up to his room in the rectory to watch television, where he raped him. Immediately after the attack, Daniel ran into Peter Welsh in the church and told him what happened. Welch went upstairs to take Martins' confession, but did nothing else.

A few days later, Daniel told his story to a math teacher, who relayed it to the head of the school, John Shelley. Daniel also told his parents. When Daniel went to mass on Sunday, Shelley told him that he could not longer be an altar boy. His schoolmates found out about the incident and hazed him mercilessly. Martins was arrested and convicted of sexual assault in February 1985. He was sentenced in July 1985 to 23 to 46 months in prison. However, after only five weeks, the US Immigration Service deported Martins to Brazil.

=== William McCandless ===
On December 3, 2020, William McCandless, a member of the Oblates de St. Francis De Sales, was arrested in Philadelphia for possession of child pornography. He had been serving on the faculty of DeSales University in Center Valley, Pennsylvania. At the time of his arrest, McCandless had accumulated over 3,000 pornographic web pages, most them during his time in Monaco while serving as an advisor to the House of Grimaldi. Some of these images reportedly showed the sexual torture of children. In May 2022, McCandless pleaded guilty to access and attempted access with intent to view child pornography. He was sentenced in January 2023 to 37 months’ imprisonment followed by 15 years of supervised release.

=== Bernard Shero ===
Shero, a teacher at the parish school at St. Joseph's parish, was arrested in February 2011 on sexual abuse charges against Danny Gallagher, then a 10-year-old student, starting in 2000. Tried along with Charles Engelhardt in June 2013, Shero was convicted of rape, attempted rape, involuntary deviant sexual intercourse and indecent sexual assault. He was sentenced to eight to 16 years in prison and five years of probation.

In August 2017, a judge dismissed Shero's conviction, due to questions about Gallagher's truthfulness. In a plea agreement with prosecutors to avoid a new trial, Shero pleaded no contest to child rape and was sentenced to time served, which was approximately four years in prison.

=== Michael Swierzy ===
The parents of a fifth-grade boy contacted the archdiocese in April 1997, claiming that Swierzy was giving their son beer, kissing him and sleeping with him. Swierzy was the principal of Cardinal Dougherty High School in Philadelphia. During the investigation, police found pictures of young men in underwear in Swierzy's residence. He pleaded guilty in January 1998 to once count of corruption of the morals of a minor and was sentenced to five years of probation.

=== Francis Trauger ===
On September 3, 2019, Trauger was arrested and charged with sexually abusing two altar boys while serving at St. Michael the Archangel Church in Tullytown between 1993 and 2003. He would fondle the boys during the robing process before mass. Trauger was laicized in 2003. In July 2020, Trauger pleaded guilty to two counts of indecent assault of a minor. He was sentenced to 18 to 36 months in prison, with seven months probation.
