= Louis Amarando =

American politician (1915–1969)

Louis Joseph Amarando (September 26, 1915 - October 23, 1969) was a Democratic politician from Philadelphia who served in the state House of Representatives and as Clerk of the Court of Quarter Sessions.

Amarando was born in Philadelphia in 1915. He graduated from South Philadelphia High School and attended the American Institute of Banking before becoming an accountant and insurance broker. He married Julia Colanzi in 1936, with whom he had two sons. Amarando was active in local charitable and political causes, becoming leader of the 26th Ward Democratic Executive Committee. He also served as vice president of the Broad Street Trust Company.

He was elected to the state legislature in 1948, representing South Philadelphia; he was reelected every two years through 1956. Amarando also served as a delegate to the 1956 and 1960 Democratic National Conventions. When the Philadelphia Register of Wills, Joseph A. Scanlon, died in 1957, Amarando was named to replace him. In the special election for the post that year, he won an easy victory over his Republican opponent.

Amarando was elected to a full four-year term as chief clerk of the court of quarter sessions in 1959, and again in 1963. The non-partisan Committee of Seventy praised Amarando's devotion to efficiency in his office, but he often clashed with Democratic party leaders Richardson Dilworth and William J. Green Jr. He was nonetheless popular in the city, and The Philadelphia Inquirer described him as "politically unbeatable." In 1969, Amarando died suddenly while en route to Philadelphia's Methodist Hospital.

== Sources ==
- "Louis J. Amarando Dies, Clerk of Court". The Philadelphia Inquirer. October 24, 1969. p. 36 – via Newspapers.com.
- "Louis J. Amarando". Historical Biographies. Pennsylvania House of Representatives. 2017.
