= Thomas Masterson (American Revolution) =

Thomas Masterson was an officer in the American Revolution, serving as a Midshipman in the Virginia State Navy.

== Biography ==
As one of limited number of naval officers who served for a full three years, Thomas Masterson is represented today in The Society of the Cincinnati

Thomas Masterson was born about 1750 in Fairfax County, Virginia to Edward Masterson and his wife Mary.

Edward Masterson died while Thomas was still a minor; his will probated September 18, 1754.

Thomas' uncle, Joseph Farrow, apprenticed the fatherless Thomas Masterson to the ship's carpenter Thomas Dagg in 1766.

Thomas Masterson served as a Midshipman aboard the Virginia State Navy brig "Tempest".

At a battle on the James River, near Osborne's, on April 27, 1781, the Tempest was lost to the British, with several of the officers taken prisoner.

Thomas Masterson survived the war, but died insolvent around 1791.
