= Stanley B. Smullen =

American politician

Stanley Bartlett Smullen Jr. (September 3, 1906 – July 9, 1998) was a Philadelphia businessman who served briefly on the Philadelphia City Council as a Republican.

Smullen was born in 1906 in Point Breeze, Philadelphia, the eldest child of Stanley and Mabel Smullen. The family moved to the city's Mount Airy neighborhood where Smullen's father worked in real estate. Smullen graduated from the University of Pennsylvania's Wharton School, then joined his father's business. In 1928, he married Charlotte E. Greenwood, with whom he had two children. Smullen also got involved in Republican politics and became the leader of the 59th Ward.

In 1961, the Democratic city councilman for the 8th district, Alfred Leopold Luongo, was appointed to the federal bench, and Republican ward leaders chose Smullen to run in the special election to replace him. He defeated his Democratic opponent, John A. Geisz, to take the seat for the Republicans.

Smullen's term was just over a year, and Republican ward leaders backed him for the nomination to a full term in 1963. In the 1963 election, redistricting added the 49th ward to Smullen's district; the result was a narrow victory for his Democratic opponent, Isadore H. Bellis. In 1964, Smullen ran for the Pennsylvania House of Representatives, but fell short of victory, losing to Democrat Walter H. Morley. He continued to run his real estate business and worked for the state department of commerce, but did not run for office again. He later retired to Ship Bottom, New Jersey, where he died in 1998.

== Sources ==
- "1910 United States Federal Census, T624_1400, page 8A". Ancestry.com.
- "Smullen Choice in Council Race". The Philadelphia Inquirer. August 30, 1962. p. 4 – via Newspapers.com.
- Salgado, Robert J. (November 7, 1962). "GOP Captures Council Seat, Foes Take Two". The Philadelphia Inquirer. p. 2 – via Newspapers.com.
- "GOP Leaders Back Smullen". The Philadelphia Inquirer. February 14, 1963. p. 4 – via Newspapers.com.
- Goulden, Joseph C. (November 6, 1963). "Two Democrats Ousted, GOP Gains One Council Seat". The Philadelphia Inquirer. p. 5 – via Newspapers.com.
- "Vote in Phila. At A Glance". The Philadelphia Inquirer. November 5, 1964. p. 5 – via Newspapers.com.
- "Stanley B. Smullen, Jr". Asbury Park Press. July 11, 1998 – via Newspapers.com.
