= Thomas Ambrose Masterson =

American judge (1927–2000)

Judge of the United States District Court for the Eastern District of Pennsylvania
- In office June 15, 1967 – November 16, 1973
- Appointed by: Lyndon B. Johnson
- Preceded by: Seat established by 80 Stat. 75
- Succeeded by: Joseph Leo McGlynn Jr.

Personal details
- Born: Thomas Ambrose Masterson; December 10, 1927 Philadelphia, Pennsylvania
- Died: June 15, 2000 (aged 72) Bryn Mawr, Pennsylvania
- Education: Harvard University (B.A.); University of Pennsylvania Law School (LL.B.)

Thomas Ambrose Masterson (December 10, 1927 – June 15, 2000) was a United States district judge of the United States District Court for the Eastern District of Pennsylvania.

== Education and career ==
Born in Philadelphia, Pennsylvania, Masterson received a Bachelor of Arts degree from Harvard University in 1949 and a Bachelor of Laws from the University of Pennsylvania Law School in 1952. He was an attorney at the United States Department of Justice in Washington, D.C. from 1952 to 1953. He was a volunteer defender in Philadelphia in 1953. He was in private practice in Philadelphia and an instructor at Seton Hall University School of Law from 1953 to 1956. He became an assistant District Attorney of Philadelphia 1956 and was deputy city solicitor from 1956 to 1960.

== Federal judicial service ==
Masterson was nominated by President Lyndon B. Johnson on January 16, 1967, to the United States District Court for the Eastern District of Pennsylvania, to a new seat created by 80 Stat. 75. He was confirmed by the United States Senate on June 12, 1967, and received his commission on June 15, 1967. Masterson served in that capacity until his resignation on November 16, 1973.

== Post judicial service ==
Following his resignation from the federal bench, Masterson was in private practice in Philadelphia until his death on June 15, 2000, in Bryn Mawr, Pennsylvania.

== Sources ==
Legal offices
Preceded by Seat established by 80 Stat. 75	Judge of the United States District Court for the Eastern District of Pennsylvania; 1967–1973	Succeeded by Joseph Leo McGlynn Jr.
