= David Silver (Philadelphia) =

American politician (1919–1990)

David Silver in 1971

David L. Silver (February 23, 1919 – December 16, 1990) was a Republican politician and businessman from Northeast Philadelphia who served for two terms on the Philadelphia City Council.

== Early life and family ==
Silver was born in South Philadelphia in 1919, the son of Sam and Fannie Silver, who were Jewish immigrants from Russia. He graduated from South Philadelphia High School and served in the United States Army. By the early 1960s, Silver was married with three children and working as a barrel dealer in Northeast Philadelphia, where he also served as president of the Bustleton Civic League and as head of the Republican Party's 58th ward. In February 1963, he testified about corruption involving zoning variances for a grand jury probe of city government. Later that year, he was nominated by Republicans for the 10th district seat on City Council and won, unseating Democratic incumbent Robert B. Winkelman in a victory the Philadelphia Daily News called "unexpected."

== City Council ==
Two months into his term, Silver suffered a health crisis, but soon recovered. Returning to work, he spent much of that year fighting Democratic efforts to change the zoning in his district to allow greater housing density. He also called on city leaders to include the Northeast in its plans for playgrounds and rec facilities, accusing Mayor James Tate of neglecting the area. After a race riot in North Philadelphia in August 1964, Silver accused Tate of restraining the police too much, allowing widespread looting. "If they had entered my store and began looting," Silver told reporters, "I would have shot them."

By 1965, Democrats accused Silver of doing the very thing he had promised to prevent: upzoning sections of the Northeast to allow apartments and shopping centers; Silver responded that his critics were "wet behind the ears." Silver later charged that zoning in the Northeast was all controlled by the Democrats who accepted bribes — comments that did not win him friends on City Council. "Stand anywhere in the Northeast," he said, "and throw a rock, and you'll hit a crooked deal." He attracted some attention from the opposite direction as well that year, when Democratic State Representative Melvin J. Greenberg noted the oddity of Silver not opposing a similar zoning change on a property across the street from the councilman's own house. In 1967, the city approved construction there of the Pine Hill Home, a privately run rehabilitation center for disabled children.

Silver faced primary opposition in 1967 from interior decorator and first-time candidate John J. Griffin, but easily defeated him. His opponent in the general election, Harry Blatstein, accused Silver of having a financial interest in the Pine Hill Home facility for which he had recently supported rezoning, but Silver said that while he was associated with the owners, the venture was not intended to be a profit-making one. In the November election, he defeated Blatstein by 8,000 votes.

Silver opened his second term by pressing for a ban on hunting in the city limits, a recognition that even the farthest reaches of the city were now too densely populated for residents to fire guns safely. As construction began at the rehab facility, Silver continued to feud with his neighbors about it, including filing a libel suit against one of them who said that "you will have to give the Councilman a piece of the action" to get zoning changes in the Northeast. In 1968, when the School District of Philadelphia proposed desegregation busing, Silver said he had no objection to black children being bused into Northeast schools, but opposed busing students from his area into inner-city schools.

By 1970, members of the Northeast Citizens Planning Council attempted to recall Silver from office, alleging that he "has been neglecting the community groups in favor of the developers." The effort was not successful. Meanwhile, the fight over the Pine Hill Home dragged on as the Pennsylvania Supreme Court found the zoning change to have been illegal spot zoning. City Council — with Silver abstaining — responded by rezoning the area more broadly, thus allowing the nearly completed facility to proceed with construction.

Silver defeated primary challengers easily in 1971 and moved on to face Greenberg, who had won the Democratic nomination, in the general election. The zoning controversies, along with the popularity of Democratic mayoral nominee Frank Rizzo, made the race challenging for Silver. In the end, Greenberg defeated him by a vote margin of nearly two-to-one.

== Perjury charges ==
After leaving public office, the Pine Hill matter and another conflict-of-interest case involving zoning continued to plague Silver. As investigations proceeded, it became clear that Silver had perjured himself when testifying about when and how he acquired an interest in the properties, which led to an investigation by Philadelphia District Attorney Arlen Specter. In July 1973, a grand jury indicted him for perjury, one of three indictments that month of former City Council members. The case dragged on as Specter sought an out-of-town judge to hear it and the state Supreme Court was slow to assign one; the delays ultimately led the case against Silver to be dismissed.

In 1975, Silver ran for an at-large seat on City Council, this time as a Democrat. He was one of sixty candidates for five nominations in a crowded primary and finished far back of the winners. It marked his last attempt at elected office. Silver died in 1990 and was buried at Shalom Memorial Park.

== Sources ==
- "1930 United States Federal Census, Enumeration district 0184, page 13B". Ancestry.com.
- "GOP Slates McDermott for Council Post". Philadelphia Daily News. September 21, 1962. p. 13 – via Newspapers.com.
- Karafin, Harry J.; McDonough, Donald A. (February 7, 1963). "Zoning Probe is Extended by New Witnesses". The Philadelphia Inquirer. p. 6 – via Newspapers.com.
- Bellinger, Harry (November 6, 1963). "GOP Adds New Voice To Council". Philadelphia Daily News. p. 4 – via Newspapers.com.
- "Heart Hospitalizes Councilman Silver". Philadelphia Daily News. March 9, 1964. p. 3 – via Newspapers.com.
- "Hearing Scheduled on Re-Zoning Plan". Philadelphia Inquirer. March 12, 1964. p. 8B – via Newspapers.com.
- "Silver to Return to City Hall". Philadelphia Inquirer. March 15, 1964. p. 3 – via Newspapers.com.
- "City Neglect of Area in Recreation Decried". Philadelphia Inquirer. May 24, 1964. p. 1-NE – via Newspapers.com.
- Scheinfeld, Lou (September 14, 1964). "Merchants to Have Say in Council's Riot Quiz". Philadelphia Daily News. p. 2 – via Newspapers.com.
- Feist, William F.; Hussie, Edward J. (September 16, 1964). "Police Should Have Shot Riot Looters, Councilman Says". The Philadelphia Inquirer. p. 7 – via Newspapers.com.
- "Silver Defends Zoning Stand". Philadelphia Inquirer. April 1, 1965a. p. 1-NE – via Newspapers.com.
- Scheinfeld, Lou (June 14, 1965a). "Demos Still Sell Legislation — Silver". Philadelphia Daily News. pp. 3, 34 – via Newspapers.com.
- Scheinfeld, Lou (June 18, 1965b). "Silver Holds Ground to Demo Charges". Philadelphia Daily News. pp. 3, 40 – via Newspapers.com.
- "Bustleton Zoning Case Sparks Row Between Silver, Greenberg". Philadelphia Inquirer. December 2, 1965b. p. 1-NE – via Newspapers.com.
- Heymsfeld, Jeremy; Klimcke, Alfred P. (May 17, 1967). "D'Ortona Leads Field of 33 in Council Battle". The Philadelphia Inquirer. p. 4 – via Newspapers.com.
- "Facility OKd for Retarded on Verree Rd". Philadelphia Inquirer. July 13, 1967. p. 59 – via Newspapers.com.
- "Critic of Changes In Zoning Finds Case for Support". Philadelphia Daily News. July 13, 1967. p. 13 – via Newspapers.com.
- Bulletin Almanac 1968. Philadelphia, Pennsylvania: The Philadelphia Bulletin. 1968. OCLC 8641470.
- "Bill to Ban Hunting Pressed". Philadelphia Inquirer. February 1, 1968. p. 22A – via Newspapers.com.
- "Silver Sues Neighbor in Zoning Squabble". Philadelphia Daily News. July 22, 1968. p. 5 – via Newspapers.com.
- McKelvey, Gerald (September 22, 1968). "Parents Decide to Wait for School Board's Next Move". The Philadelphia Inquirer. pp. NE-1, NE-5 – via Newspapers.com.
- "Citizens Group Considering Movement for Recall of Silver". Philadelphia Inquirer. January 15, 1970. pp. 19, 20 – via Newspapers.com.
- "City to Clear Zoning Cases". Philadelphia Inquirer. November 22, 1970. p. 3 – via Newspapers.com.
- "Council Bars Any Move to Demolish Care Center". Philadelphia Inquirer. January 10, 1971. p. 3 – via Newspapers.com.
- Clancy, John F. (May 19, 1971). "Indorsed Candidates Sweep Council Races". The Philadelphia Inquirer. p. 5 – via Newspapers.com.
- Lynch, Dan (October 11, 1971). "Republican Support For Rizzo Scrambles Council Races". The Philadelphia Inquirer. pp. 13, 20 – via Newspapers.com.
- "No Safe Council Seats This Year". Philadelphia Inquirer. October 24, 1971. pp. 5, 6 – via Newspapers.com.
- Campisi, Gloria (November 3, 1971). "Dems Hold Council, 2 Incumbents Lose". Philadelphia Daily News. pp. 3, 8 – via Newspapers.com.
- Lame, Anthony (January 25, 1973a). "Second Zoning 'Conflict' Case in Council is Revealed". Philadelphia Inquirer. pp. 1-D, 3-D – via Newspapers.com.
- Lame, Anthony (May 10, 1973b). "Silver Contradictions Found". Philadelphia Inquirer. p. 3-C – via Newspapers.com.
- Goldsmith, Philip R. (July 12, 1973). "Silver Is Indicted On Perjury Count". Philadelphia Inquirer. pp. 1-A, 2-A – via Newspapers.com.
- Lame, Anthony (December 14, 1974). "Silver Free of Charges". Philadelphia Inquirer. pp. 1-A, 2-A – via Newspapers.com.
- Racher, Dave (December 16, 1974). "Justice Tilts For 2 Pols". Philadelphia Daily News. pp. 3, 23 – via Newspapers.com.
- "Rizzo Carries Council Slate". Philadelphia Daily News. May 16, 1975. p. 5 – via Newspapers.com.
- "Silver, David". The Philadelphia Inquirer. December 17, 1990. p. 13-D – via Newspapers.com.
