= John M. McDevitt =

American politician

Father John Michael McDevitt, Jr.
- Roman Catholic Priest, Former Philadelphia City Councilman
- Father John M. McDevitt in 1966
- Church: Roman Catholic Church
- Diocese: Roman Catholic Diocese of Wilmington

Orders
- Ordination: 1962 by Oblates of St. Francis de Sales

Personal details
- Born: John Michael McDevitt, Jr. March 12, 1924 Philadelphia, Pennsylvania, United States
- Died: October 3, 1999 (aged 75) Philadelphia, Pennsylvania, United States
- Denomination: Roman Catholic
- Occupation: Catholic Priest, Former Philadelphia City Council Member
- Education: La Salle University

John Michael McDevitt, Jr., OSFS, (March 12, 1924 – October 3, 1999) was a Democratic politician from Philadelphia who later became a Roman Catholic priest and educator. In 2011, the Oblates of St Francis de Sales priests admitted that McDevitt was a child molester as part of a lawsuit settlement in the State of Delaware.

McDevitt was born on March 12, 1924, the second child and eldest son of John M. McDevitt, Sr., and his wife, Elizabeth Mulligan McDevitt. He graduated from Northeast Catholic High School in 1942 and enlisted in the United States Army after graduation. Serving in the 20th Armored Division, McDevitt saw action in World War II's European theater.

When the war ended, he returned home to Philadelphia and entered local politics as a protege of John F. Byrne, Sr., a city councilman. According to a 1962 profile in The Philadelphia Inquirer, McDevitt "devoted much of his free time to athletic affairs for youth," and founded the Summerdale Boys Club in Northeast Philadelphia. In the early 1950s, he worked as the personnel director for the Democratic City Committee, the governing body of the local Democratic Party. He later was employed as a clerk in the Philadelphia Orphans' Court while attending La Salle College, from which he graduated with a business management degree in 1956.

In 1955, McDevitt worked as a tax appraiser for the state department of revenue. Later that year, he ran for an open seat on the Philadelphia City Council from the 10th district, representing Far Northeast Philadelphia. He won, carrying the seat with 54% of the vote. On the council, McDevitt chaired the Streets and Public Safety Committees. In 1959, he was reelected with a slightly increased majority.

In 1962, McDevitt resigned from City Council to enter the seminary of the Oblates of St. Francis de Sales, the order of priests that taught at his high school. In his final session on the council, his colleagues praised his work there, and Councilman Victor E. Moore said that McDevitt "possesses certain attributes which would make him exemplary in his chosen profession." In an investigation into graft in city government that followed McDevitt's departure, the seminarian initially declined to testify to the grand jury, but in 1964 answered District Attorney James C. Crumlish's questions there. The grand jury did not recommend charges against him.

After his ordination, McDevitt taught at Salesianum School in Wilmington, Delaware for the 1967–1968 school year before returning to Philadelphia to teach theology at Northeast Catholic from 1968 to 1980. He taught at Bishop McDevitt High School in Harrisburg for two years, returned to Salesianum from 1982 to 1989, then taught at Father Judge High School, also in Northeast Philadelphia, from 1989 until his retirement in 1994. He died of liver cancer in 1999.

== Child abuse ==
Ten years after his death, a former student accused McDevitt of having sexually abused him while he taught at Father Judge. The case became a part of the larger sexual abuse scandal in the Roman Catholic Archdiocese of Philadelphia, in which several priests were convicted and jailed.

McDevitt's association with the Philadelphia Orphans’ Court, Summerdale Boys’ Club and all male Catholic high schools provided him access to minors. McDevitt used typical grooming techniques to build trust with his targets and victims. McDevitt attempted to create a closer connection with children by going by the moniker “Uncle Jack”.

In 2011, the Oblates of St Francis de Sales (the order or priests to which McDevitt belonged) admitted that McDevitt had sexually abused children, as part of a lawsuit settlement in the State of Delaware.

In 2018, the Pennsylvania grand jury report on sexual abuse of minors in the Catholic Church included the account of a male who stated that the adult McDevitt attempted to forcibly kiss him while in high school.

== Sources ==
Book

- Bulletin Almanac 1956. Philadelphia, Pennsylvania: The Philadelphia Bulletin. 1956. OCLC 8641470.

Newspapers

- Schraga, Saul (February 20, 1957). "2 Building Inspectors Fired on Charges of Irregularites". The Philadelphia Inquirer. p. 31 – via Newspapers.com.
- "City Vote Cast For Candidates". The Philadelphia Inquirer. November 5, 1959 – via Newspapers.com.
- "McDevitt Enters Priesthood". The Philadelphia Inquirer. June 29, 1962. p. 1 – via Newspapers.com.
- "Benign City Father". The Philadelphia Inquirer. June 29, 1962. p. 5 – via Newspapers.com.
- "D.A. Reveals Quiz of McDevitt in Grand Jury Zoning Probe". The Philadelphia Inquirer. April 6, 1964. p. 27 – via Newspapers.com.
- Pray, Rusty (October 5, 1999). "Rev. J.M. McDevitt, an ex-Councilman, 75". The Philadelphia Inquirer. p. B4 – via Newspapers.com.
- O'Reilly, David (June 19, 2009). "Abuse Suit Targets Order of Priests". The Philadelphia Inquirer. p. B1 – via Newspapers.com.
- “Delaware priest sex abuse cases settled”; Associated Press; Aug 7, 2011
- Wilson, Xerxes (August 16, 2018). "Priests in Pennsylvania sex abuse report have Salesianum, Archmere ties". Delawareonline.com.
