= Victor E. Moore =

American politician (1897-1982)

Member of the Philadelphia City Council At-Large
- In office 1952–1962
- Succeeded by: Walter S. Pytko

Personal details
- Born: Victor Edward Moore; November 13, 1897 Illinois, U.S.
- Died: August 22, 1982 (aged 84) Philadelphia, Pennsylvania, U.S.
- Party: Democratic
- Education: University of Pennsylvania

Victor Edward Moore (November 13, 1897 – August 22, 1982) was a Philadelphia businessman and Democratic politician. He served three terms on the Philadelphia City Council and as chairman of the Philadelphia Gas Works.

== Early life ==
Moore was born in Illinois in 1897. After moving to Philadelphia as a child, he attended West Philadelphia High School, where he excelled in baseball and football. While attending the University of Pennsylvania, he also took up rowing, which became a lifelong pursuit. Through rowing, Moore became associated with Jack Kelly Sr., the Olympic medallist and Democratic politico. In 1935, he was elected president of the Schuylkill Navy's Malta Boat Club. He also became successful in the tool and equipment business.

== Philadelphia politics ==
Through his connections with Kelly, Moore became involved in local politics, being appointed executive secretary of the Democratic City Committee in 1940. The following year, Governor Arthur H. James appointed Moore as a Democratic member of Philadelphia's new bipartisan Registration Commission. Later that year, Moore was the subject of a write-in campaign for mayor, which city officials declared invalid. After World War II began, he became involved in the Civil Defense Corps. In 1943, there was a grand jury investigation of the Registration Commission, which Moore called a "fishing expedition." No charges were brought, and in 1945 Governor Edward Martin reappointed the entire board, including Moore. He was among the group of investors that bought the Philadelphia Eagles in 1949. In 1951, Michael DiSalle appointed Moore to a temporary post with the Korean War-era Office of Price Stabilization, a federal agency devoted to price controls.

== City Council ==
Later that year, after Philadelphia adopted a new city charter, Moore ran for an at-large seat on the reformed city council. He was elected, part of a wave election that swept the Republicans from power for the first time in 67 years. Moore won the highest vote total of any of the seven at-large candidates elected. In Council, he chaired the Transportation and Public Utilities Committee. In 1952, just a year after the city charter's adoption, Moore called for revisions to it that would take certain powers from appointed officials and return them to City Council. That same year, he advocated tearing down Philadelphia's City Hall and replacing it with a modern office building (the proposal was not adopted).

Moore resisted calls from Democratic Mayor Joseph S. Clark Jr. to increase the city budget and raise taxes, proposing a budget smaller by $19 million. Clark's budget eventually passed Council without Moore's vote. Moore continued to oppose Clark and the charter, joining the efforts of James Tate and Michael J. Towey to weaken the charter's civil service reforms (they were unsuccessful). He was re-elected in 1955, again leading all candidates for at-large seats. In the next council session, Moore became chairman of the Finance Committee.

On the Finance Committee, Moore developed a reputation as the city's "financial watchdog" as he scrutinized spending requests from the new mayor, Richardson Dilworth. He served as Council's representative on the Philadelphia Transportation Company's board of directors, and fought for the construction of the Delaware Expressway. In addition to fighting tax increases, Moore and Tate worked to keep utilities costs from increasing excessively. In 1958, Moore considered a run for Lieutenant Governor, but changed his mind when Clark, now a United States Senator, blocked the Democratic Party establishment from endorsing him. Instead, he ran for a third term on City Council in 1959, and garnered the second-most votes of any at-large candidate.

== Gas Works and grand jury ==
In 1960, Moore investigated waste within the Philadelphia Gas Works. At the same time, he found himself (and fellow Councilman John F. Byrne Sr.,) under investigation after campaign contribution pay-to-play allegations concerning work done by city contractors to rebuild the Market–Frankford Elevated Line. He resigned from Council in 1962 to become chairman of the Gas Works, where he promised to root out waste and corruption. The grand jury investigation led to an indictment in 1963, but Moore was found not guilty. He resigned from the Gas Works post in 1965 and retired to Florida in 1967. He remained there until 1982, when he died and was buried in West Palm Beach's Woodlawn Cemetery.

== Sources ==
- "Cats, Mice, and City Hall". The Philadelphia Inquirer. May 8, 1952. p. 12 – via Newspapers.com.
- "City Vote Cast For Candidates". The Philadelphia Inquirer. November 5, 1959. p. 4 – via Newspapers.com.
- Collins, William B. (September 2, 1962). "Special Grand Jury Part I: Focus on Corruption". The Philadelphia Inquirer. p. 1 – via Newspapers.com.
- "Councilman Urges Cut In '58 Water-Rate Boost". The Philadelphia Inquirer. October 10, 1957. p. 29 – via Newspapers.com.
- "Dallas Loses by 457, Party's Lone Casualty". The Philadelphia Inquirer. November 9, 1955. p. 1 – via Newspapers.com.
- "Democrats Drop Moore, Back Davis". The Philadelphia Inquirer. March 6, 1958. p. 1 – via Newspapers.com.
- "Democrats Issue Slate of Primary Candidates". The Philadelphia Inquirer. May 19, 1951. p. 1 – via Newspapers.com.
- Feist, William F. (January 11, 1952). "Setup of Committees Revamped By Council". The Philadelphia Inquirer. p. 50 – via Newspapers.com.
- "Judge Clears Victor Moore in 2-Hr Trial". The Philadelphia Inquirer. January 17, 1964. p. 1 – via Newspapers.com.
- "Judge Orders Registration Board Probed". The Philadelphia Inquirer. April 7, 1943. p. 1 – via Newspapers.com.
- Lush, Gerson H. (August 2, 1941). "New Registry Board for City Appointed by James; Only 1 Holdover". The Philadelphia Inquirer. p. 3 – via Newspapers.com.
- "Malta Boat Club Installs Officers at 75th Birthday". The Philadelphia Inquirer. November 17, 1935. p. 54 – via Newspapers.com.
- Miller, Joseph H. (February 18, 1954). "Council Unit OKs 6-Point Plan to 'Wreck' Charter". The Philadelphia Inquirer. p. 1 – via Newspapers.com.
- Miller, Joseph H. (January 10, 1945). "Whole Registration Board Will Be Reappointed". The Philadelphia Inquirer. p. 10 – via Newspapers.com.
- "Moore Blasts Charter, 'Bad Public Manners,' and 'Ineptness' of Aids". The Philadelphia Inquirer. June 6, 1952. p. 1 – via Newspapers.com.
- "Moore Offered Price Post Here". The Philadelphia Inquirer. January 26, 1951. p. 4 – via Newspapers.com.
- "Rent Control Extension Approved". The Philadelphia Inquirer. January 27, 1956. p. 7 – via Newspapers.com.
- Schraga, Saul (November 27, 1952). "Council Votes 3-Mill Business Tax And Levy On Real Estate Transfers". The Philadelphia Inquirer. p. 1 – via Newspapers.com.
- Schraga, Saul (February 26, 1956). "Keep Pension Age, Moore Warns". The Philadelphia Inquirer. p. 43 – via Newspapers.com.
- "$600,000 Waste Exposed in Gas Works Operation". The Philadelphia Inquirer. March 8, 1960. p. 39 – via Newspapers.com.
- "Victor E. Moore, 84, major figure in Phila. politics in '40s, '50s, '60s". The Philadelphia Inquirer. August 24, 1982. p. E-1 – via Newspapers.com.
- "Voters Warned About 'Write-Ins'". The Philadelphia Inquirer. October 2, 1941. p. 2 – via Newspapers.com.
- "W. Phila. To Open Defense Centre". The Philadelphia Inquirer. April 13, 1942. p. 6 – via Newspapers.com.
- Weir, Frank H. (November 16, 1952). "19 Million Cut In City Budget Urged By Moore". The Philadelphia Inquirer. p. 41 – via Newspapers.com.
- "Woman Elected to First Seat in City Council". The Philadelphia Inquirer. November 7, 1951. p. 1 – via Newspapers.com.
