= 1959 Philadelphia municipal election =

- November 3, 1959

1959 Philadelphia's municipal election, held on November 3, involved contests for mayor, all seventeen city council seats, and several other executive and judicial offices. Citywide, the Democrats took majorities of over 200,000 votes, continuing their success from the elections four years earlier. Richardson Dilworth, who had been elected mayor in 1955, was re-elected over Republican nominee Harold Stassen. The Democrats also took fifteen of seventeen city council seats, the most seats allowed to any one party under the 1951 city charter. They further kept control of the other citywide offices. The election represented a continued consolidation of control by the Democrats after their citywide victories of the previous eight years.

== Background ==
After taking control of the city government in 1951, Democrats consolidated their majorities with further success in 1955 and 1957. They hoped to continue the victories made possible by the continuing coalition of reform-minded independents and the Democratic organization led by Democratic City Committee chairman William J. Green Jr., but tension between the two groups had begun to increase by 1959 as more of the jobs and elected offices went to organization men, with reformers being increasingly marginalized. The Republican organization had largely collapsed after the 1955 defeat, but looked to rebuild and consolidate under the leadership of former sheriff Austin Meehan. However, as political scientist Robert Freedman wrote several years later, "there was not much left to consolidate." The Philadelphia Inquirer noted the dire condition of the Republicans while predicting a major Democratic victory: "the Republican organization has been on the border of collapse during the last few years and it is probable that it will not man a number of polling places on Election Day."

== Mayor ==
1959 Philadelphia mayoral election
- November 3, 1959
- Turnout: 69%
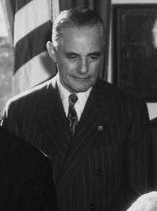

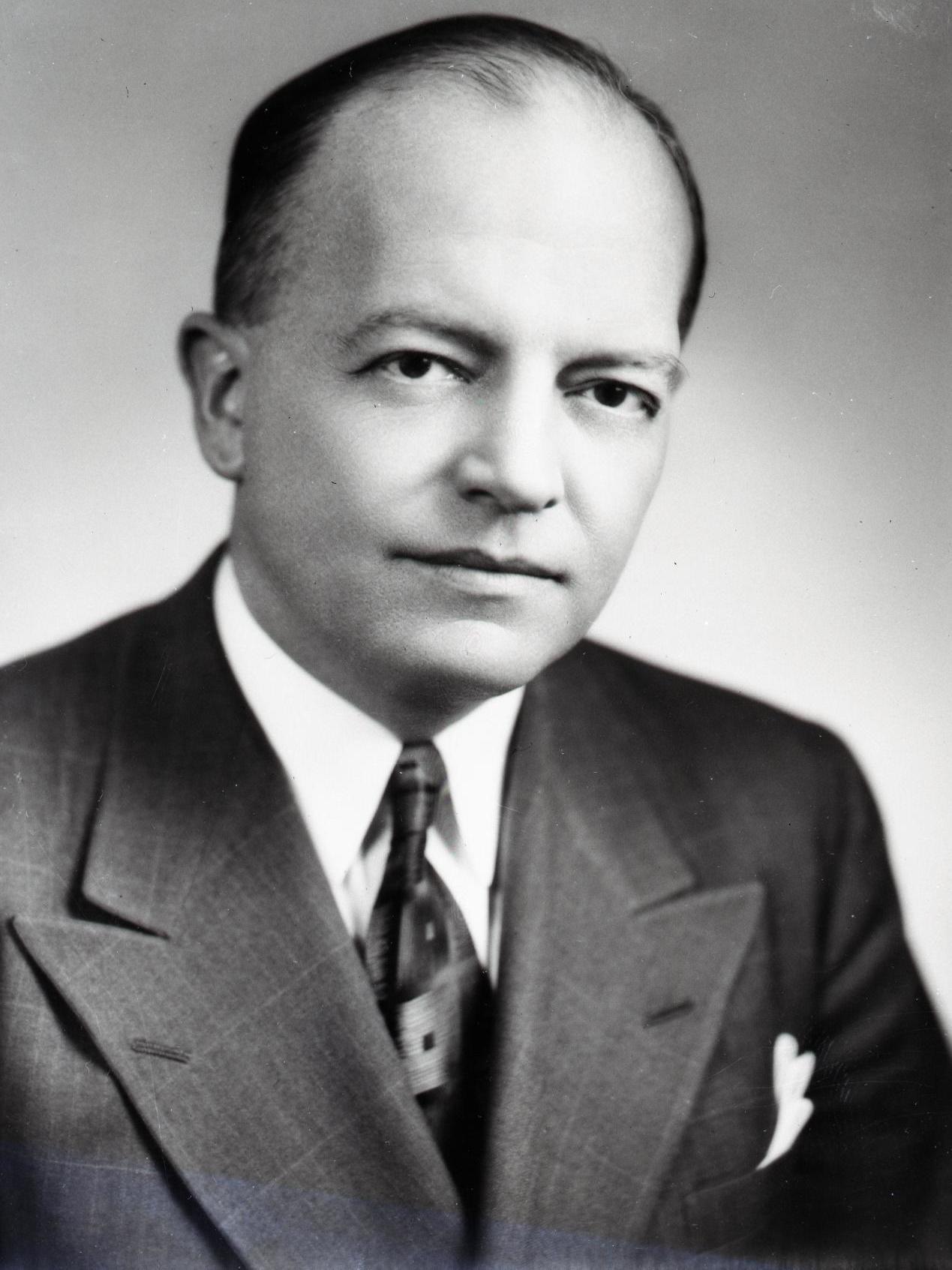
| Nominee | Richardson Dilworth | Harold Stassen |
| Party | Democratic | Republican |
| Popular vote | 438,237 | 229,818 |
| Percentage | 65.34% | 34.28% |
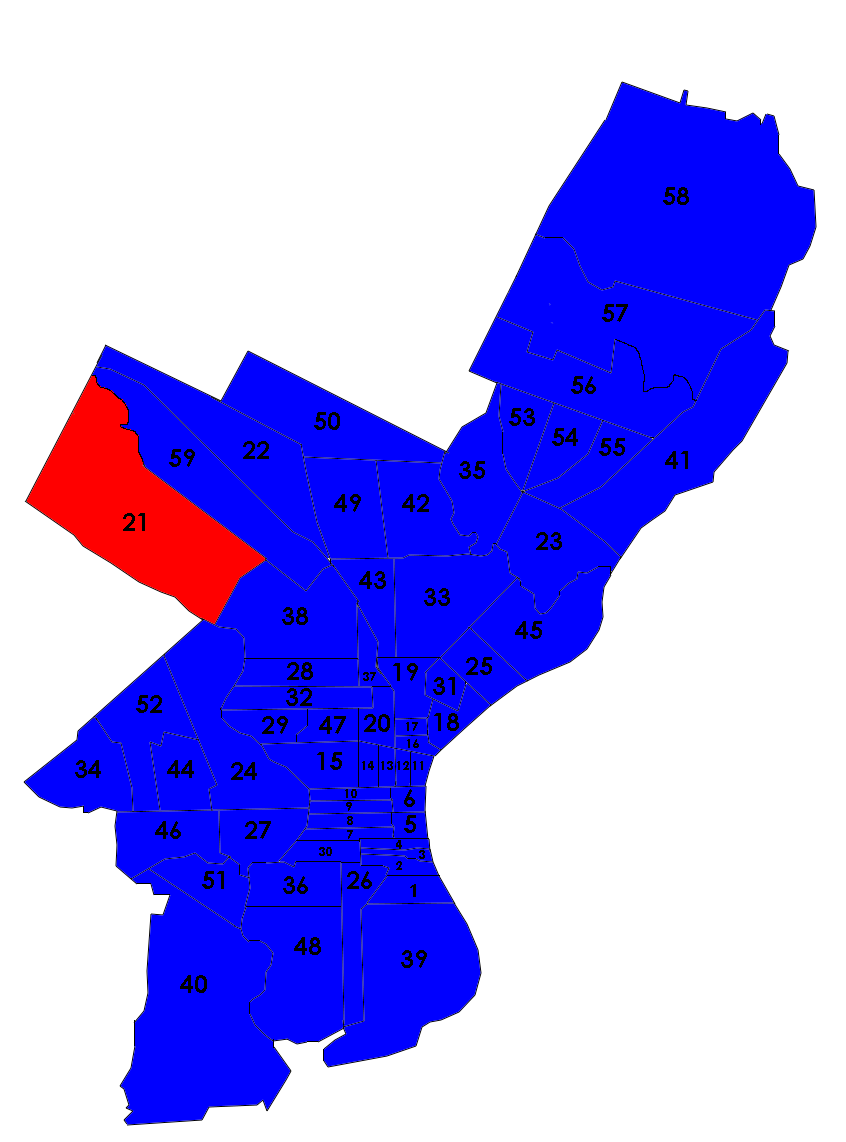
- Ward-level results in the mayor's race, with Dilworth in blue and Stassen in red
Mayor before election
Richardson Dilworth
Democratic
Elected mayor
Richardson Dilworth
Democratic

In the mayor's race, incumbent Democrat Richardson Dilworth ran for reelection against Republican Harold Stassen. After service in World War I and a law degree from Yale, Dilworth practiced law in Philadelphia. He and Joseph S. Clark Jr., were allies in the anti-corruption reform effort that had swept the city eight years earlier in coalition with the Democratic political organization. Dilworth had run for mayor unsuccessfully in 1947, with Clark as his campaign manager. In 1949, he was elected City Treasurer. He resigned that post to run for governor in 1950, but was defeated by Republican John S. Fine. Democratic party leaders had intended Dilworth to be their candidate for mayor again in 1951, but when Clark announced his candidacy, Dilworth agreed to run for district attorney instead, and won. In 1955, Dilworth got his shot at the mayor's office when Clark instead ran for the Senate; he was elected with 59% of the vote. Four years later, he was renominated without opposition.

The Republicans nominated Harold Stassen. In 1938, Stassen was elected Governor of Minnesota at the age of thirty-one. He became known as an efficient, honest, and moderately liberal governor, and was reelected in 1940 and 1942. Stassen resigned as governor shortly after his 1942 reelection to serve in World War II. He made an unsuccessful bid for the Republican nomination for president in 1948; later that year, he was appointed president of the University of Pennsylvania. After four years, he left that position to work in the Dwight D. Eisenhower administration as a special assistant for nuclear disarmament efforts. In 1958, he sought the nomination for Governor of Pennsylvania, but was unsuccessful.

As the 1959 election approached, Republican City Committee leaders Wilbur H. Hamilton and Austin Meehan backed Stassen for their party's nomination. Triumphing over token opposition in the May primary, Stassen pledged to cut taxes and promised to run a "fusion campaign," inviting the support of Democrats dissatisfied with Dilworth's administration. Dilworth called for more spending, especially on streets, highways, and public housing, and admitted that increased taxation was likely the price of those improvements.

As in 1955, the result was a landslide for Dilworth. Dilworth called the victory "greater than we had anticipated" and said the scale of the landslide "puts us on a spot. We really have to deliver during the next four years." Stassen said he would return to his law practice and promised to continue to build the Republican Party in Philadelphia. Dilworth secured nearly two-thirds of the vote and fifty-eight out of fifty-nine wards, continuing a trend of Democratic dominance in the city's politics.

1959 Philadelphia mayoral election
| Party | Candidate | Votes | % | ±% |
|---|---|---|---|---|
| Democratic | Richardson Dilworth (incumbent) | 438,237 | 65.34 | +6.04 |
| Republican | Harold Stassen | 229,818 | 34.28 | −6.42 |
| Socialist Labor | George S. Taylor | 2,536 | 0.38 | +0.38 |

== City Council ==
Philadelphians elected a seventeen-member city council in 1959, with ten members representing districts of the city, and the remaining seven being elected at-large. For the at-large seats, each political party could nominate five candidates, and voters could only vote for five, with the result being that the majority party could only take five of the seven seats, leaving two for the minority party. The Democrats' citywide dominance continued into the city council races, as took control of all ten of the district seats, up from nine in the previous election. They also retained five of seven at-large seats.

In the at-large races, four incumbent Democratic candidates, Victor E. Moore, Paul D'Ortona, Marshall L. Shepard, and Leon Kolankiewicz, were re-elected. A fifth Democrat, state legislator Mary Varallo, was elected to the seat vacated by Henry W. Sawyer when he declined to run for re-election. On the Republican side, at-large councilman Louis Schwartz retired and was replaced by Virginia Knauer. Incumbent Thomas M. Foglietta, a lawyer and son of former councilman Michael Foglietta, was re-elected. Losing bids for the Republican at-large seats were attorneys Emil F. Goldhaber and William S. Rawls, and Baptist minister Clarence M. Smith.

At the district level, Democratic incumbents Emanuel Weinberg (district 1), Gaetano Giordano (district 2), Harry Norwitch (district 3), Samuel Rose (district 4), Michael J. Towey (district 6), James Tate (district 7), Henry P. Carr (district 9), and John M. McDevitt (district 10) were all reelected. In the 5th district, Raymond Pace Alexander chose not to run for re-election and fellow Democrat Thomas McIntosh took his place. In the 8th, the Republicans lost their only district-level seat when Wilbur H. Hamilton narrowly lost out to Democrat Alfred Leopold Luongo.

At-large vote share by party
1. Democratic (64.4%)
2. Republican (35.5%)
3. Socialist Labor (0.09%)

1959 Philadelphia city council election, at large
| Party | Candidate | Votes | % | ±% |
|---|---|---|---|---|
| Democratic | Paul D'Ortona (incumbent) | 426,548 | 12.97 | +0.96 |
| Democratic | Victor E. Moore (incumbent) | 425,753 | 12.96 | +0.95 |
| Democratic | Leon Kolankiewicz (incumbent) | 422,314 | 12.86 | – |
| Democratic | Mary Varallo | 420,668 | 12.81 | – |
| Democratic | Marshall L. Shepard (incumbent) | 420,077 | 12.79 | +0.90 |
| Republican | Thomas M. Foglietta (incumbent) | 240,271 | 7.32 | −0.83 |
| Republican | Virginia Knauer | 234,392 | 7.14 | – |
| Republican | Emil F. Goldhaber | 233,871 | 7.12 | – |
| Republican | William S. Rawls | 229,719 | 6.99 | – |
| Republican | Clarence M. Smith | 227,972 | 6.94 | – |
| Socialist Labor | Harry Wade | 3,012 | 0.09 | – |

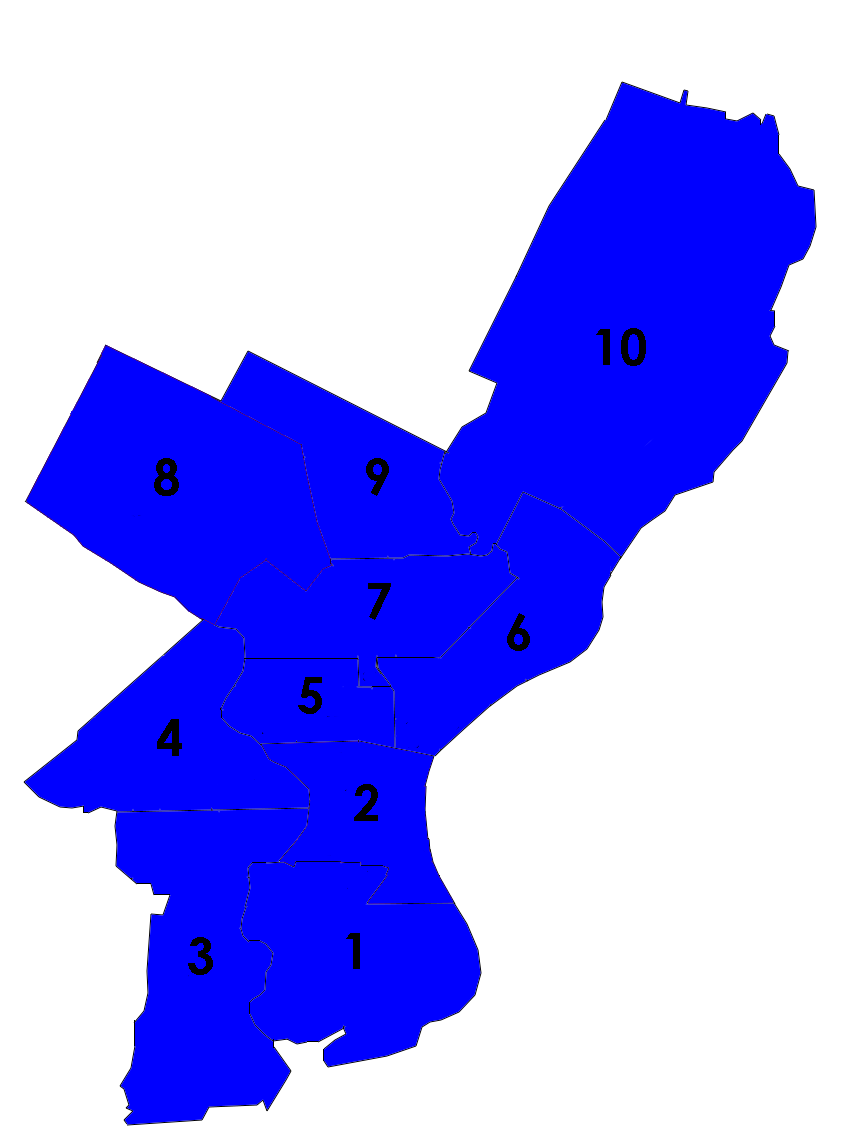
Philadelphia city council districts after the 1959 election (Democrats in blue—all ten seats)

1959 Philadelphia city council election, district 1
| Party | Candidate | Votes | % | ±% |
|---|---|---|---|---|
| Democratic | Emanuel Weinberg (incumbent) | 42,907 | 66.35 | +3.98 |
| Republican | Nunzio Carto Jr. | 21,756 | 33.65 | −1.26 |

1959 Philadelphia city council election, district 2
| Party | Candidate | Votes | % | ±% |
|---|---|---|---|---|
| Democratic | Gaetano Giordano (incumbent) | 38,601 | 64.93 | +6.18 |
| Republican | Arthur W. Binns | 20,849 | 35.07 | −6.18 |

1959 Philadelphia city council election, district 3
| Party | Candidate | Votes | % | ±% |
|---|---|---|---|---|
| Democratic | Harry Norwitch (incumbent) | 39,686 | 64.38 | +4.79 |
| Republican | Abraham Levin | 21,830 | 35.35 | −4.52 |
| Civic | T. J. O'Donnell | 166 | 0.27 | +0.27 |

1959 Philadelphia city council election, district 4
| Party | Candidate | Votes | % | ±% |
|---|---|---|---|---|
| Democratic | Samuel Rose (incumbent) | 42,711 | 73.59 | +5.01 |
| Republican | James Morse | 15,325 | 26.41 | −5.01 |

1959 Philadelphia city council election, district 5
| Party | Candidate | Votes | % | ±% |
|---|---|---|---|---|
| Democratic | Thomas McIntosh | 35,666 | 77.76 | +7.49 |
| Republican | Elsie James | 10,013 | 21.81 | −7.92 |
| Civic | Henry C. James | 188 | 0.42 | +0.42 |

1959 Philadelphia city council election, district 6
| Party | Candidate | Votes | % | ±% |
|---|---|---|---|---|
| Democratic | Michael J. Towey (incumbent) | 41,328 | 60.32 | +3.53 |
| Republican | Stanley M. Bednarik | 27,179 | 39.68 | −3.53 |

1959 Philadelphia city council election, district 7
| Party | Candidate | Votes | % | ±% |
|---|---|---|---|---|
| Democratic | James Tate (incumbent) | 43,965 | 66.88 | +4.37 |
| Republican | George W. Hufnagel | 21,769 | 33.12 | −4.37 |

1959 Philadelphia city council election, district 8
| Party | Candidate | Votes | % | ±% |
|---|---|---|---|---|
| Democratic | Alfred Leopold Luongo | 29,107 | 53.25 | +4.06 |
| Republican | Wilbur H. Hamilton | 25,551 | 46.75 | −3.20 |

1959 Philadelphia city council election, district 9
| Party | Candidate | Votes | % | ±% |
|---|---|---|---|---|
| Democratic | Henry P. Carr (incumbent) | 50,865 | 66.82 | +5.79 |
| Republican | Eugene K. Mansdoerfer | 25,254 | 33.18 | −5.79 |

1959 Philadelphia city council election, district 10
| Party | Candidate | Votes | % | ±% |
|---|---|---|---|---|
| Democratic | John M. McDevitt (incumbent) | 63,424 | 58.52 | +3.98 |
| Republican | Francis P. McCusker | 44,951 | 41.48 | −3.98 |

== City commissioners ==
In the race for city commissioners, each party nominated two candidates and the top three were elected. The office was a county office, a holdover from the time before consolidation of the townships in Philadelphia County into one city. The most important of the remaining duties of the commissioners in Philadelphia was the conduct of the city's elections; they also had responsibility for regulating weights and measures. The Democrats' success continued in those races, with incumbent commissioners Maurice S. Osser and Thomas P. McHenry being easily reelected. For the third seat, reserved for the minority party, Republican former city councilman Louis Menna edged out the incumbent Republican commissioner, Walter I. Davidson.

Philadelphia city commissioners, 1959
| Party | Candidate | Votes | % | ±% |
|---|---|---|---|---|
| Democratic | Thomas P. McHenry (incumbent) | 422,998 | 32.20 | +2.34 |
| Democratic | Maurice S. Osser (incumbent) | 421,476 | 32.08 | +2.22 |
| Republican | Louis Menna | 236,049 | 17.97 | −2.04 |
| Republican | Walter I. Davidson (incumbent) | 231,622 | 17.63 | −2.55 |
| Socialist Labor | Mary Gesensway | 1,684 | 0.13 | +0.13 |

== Other offices and ballot measures ==
Democrat William M. Lennox was reelected county sheriff, his third consecutive term. Louis Amarando, also a Democrat, was reelected clerk of the court of quarter sessions (a court whose jurisdiction was later transferred to the court of common pleas). In the special election for Register of Wills that followed the previous officeholder's appointment as a judge, Democrat John F. Walsh Jr. easily defeated Republican Jay H. Rosenfeld (Walsh had been appointed in 1959 to fill the vacancy).

The Democrats also took six of the ten magisterial district judge positions up for election that year (a local court, the duties of which have since been superseded by the Philadelphia Municipal Court) with former state representative Ralph M. Dennis leading the list. The ballot contained two referendums authorizing the city to take loans for construction of building repairs, streets, sewers, and other civic improvements. They passed with overwhelming support, tallying 70% and 72% affirmative votes.

1959 Philadelphia sheriff election
| Party | Candidate | Votes | % | ±% |
|---|---|---|---|---|
| Democratic | William M. Lennox (incumbent) | 426,620 | 64.72 | +4.91 |
| Republican | Jerome A. O'Neill | 232,558 | 35.28 | −4.91 |

1959 Philadelphia clerk of courts election
| Party | Candidate | Votes | % | ±% |
|---|---|---|---|---|
| Democratic | Louis Amarando (incumbent) | 430,056 | 64.80 | +6.81 |
| Republican | Barbara Ann Duffy | 233,649 | 35.20 | −6.81 |

1959 Philadelphia register of wills election
| Party | Candidate | Votes | % | ±% |
|---|---|---|---|---|
| Democratic | John E. Walsh Jr. | 429,466 | 65.05 | +7.26 |
| Republican | Jay H. Rosenfeld | 230,783 | 34.95 | −7.26 |

== See also ==
- List of members of Philadelphia City Council since 1952

== Sources ==
Books

- Bulletin Almanac 1960. Philadelphia, Pennsylvania: The Philadelphia Bulletin. 1960. OCLC 8641470.
- Freedman, Robert L. (1963). A Report on Politics in Philadelphia. Cambridge, Massachusetts: Joint Center for Urban Studies of the Massachusetts Institute of Technology and Harvard University. OCLC 1690059.
- Mayer, Michael F. (2010). The Eisenhower Years. New York, New York: Facts on File, Inc. ISBN 978-0-8160-5387-2.
- Office of the City Representative (1962). Decade of Progress: The story of Philadelphia, 1952–1961. Division of Public Information, Office of the City Representative. OCLC 11471789.
- Reichly, James (1959). The Art of Government: Reform and Organization Politics in Philadelphia. New York, New York: Fund for The Republic. OCLC 994205.

Journal

- Kirby, Alec (September 2003). "Harold Stassen, 13 April 1907 – 4 March 2001". Proceedings of the American Philosophical Society. 147 (3): 317–324. JSTOR 1558222.

Newspapers

- Miller, Joseph H. (February 28, 1959a). "3 GOP Politicians Pick Stassen For Mayor Race". The Philadelphia Inquirer – via Newspapers.com.
- "Both Party Slates Sweep in Phila. As M'Bride is Snowed Under". The Philadelphia Inquirer. May 20, 1959. p. 4 – via Newspapers.com.
- "Smashing Dilworth Victory Expected Here". The Philadelphia Inquirer. November 1, 1959. p. B-37 – via Newspapers.com.
- Miller, Joseph H. (November 4, 1959b). "Dilworth Re-Elected; Eagen Wins". The Philadelphia Inquirer. p. 1 – via Newspapers.com.
- "Mayor Hails Victory; Stassen Tries To Cheer Backers". The Philadelphia Inquirer. November 4, 1959 – via Newspapers.com.
- "City Vote Cast For Candidates". The Philadelphia Inquirer. November 5, 1959 – via Newspapers.com.
- "Dilworth Landslide Sinks GOP in Phila". Delaware County Daily Times. November 9, 1955 – via Newspapers.com.
- Neal, Steve (January 15, 1990). "Political Giant Joseph Clark Dead At 88". The Philadelphia Inquirer. Archived from the original on June 2, 2016.
