= 1955 Philadelphia municipal election =

- November 8, 1955

The 1955 Philadelphia municipal election, held on Tuesday, November 8, involved contests for mayor, district attorney, all seventeen city council seats, among other offices. Citywide, the Democrats took majorities of over 130,000 votes, continuing their success from the elections four years earlier. Richardson Dilworth, who had been elected district attorney in 1951, was elected mayor. Victor H. Blanc, a city councilman, was elected district attorney. The Democrats also kept fourteen of seventeen city council seats, losing one district seat while gaining another, and kept control of the other citywide offices. The election represented a further consolidation of control by the Democrats after their citywide victories of four years earlier.

== Mayor ==
1955 Philadelphia mayoral election
- November 8, 1955
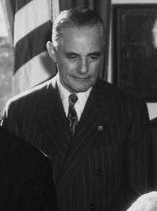

Nominee	Richardson Dilworth	Thacher Longstreth
Party	Democratic	Republican
Popular vote	423,035	290,329
Percentage	59.30%	40.70%
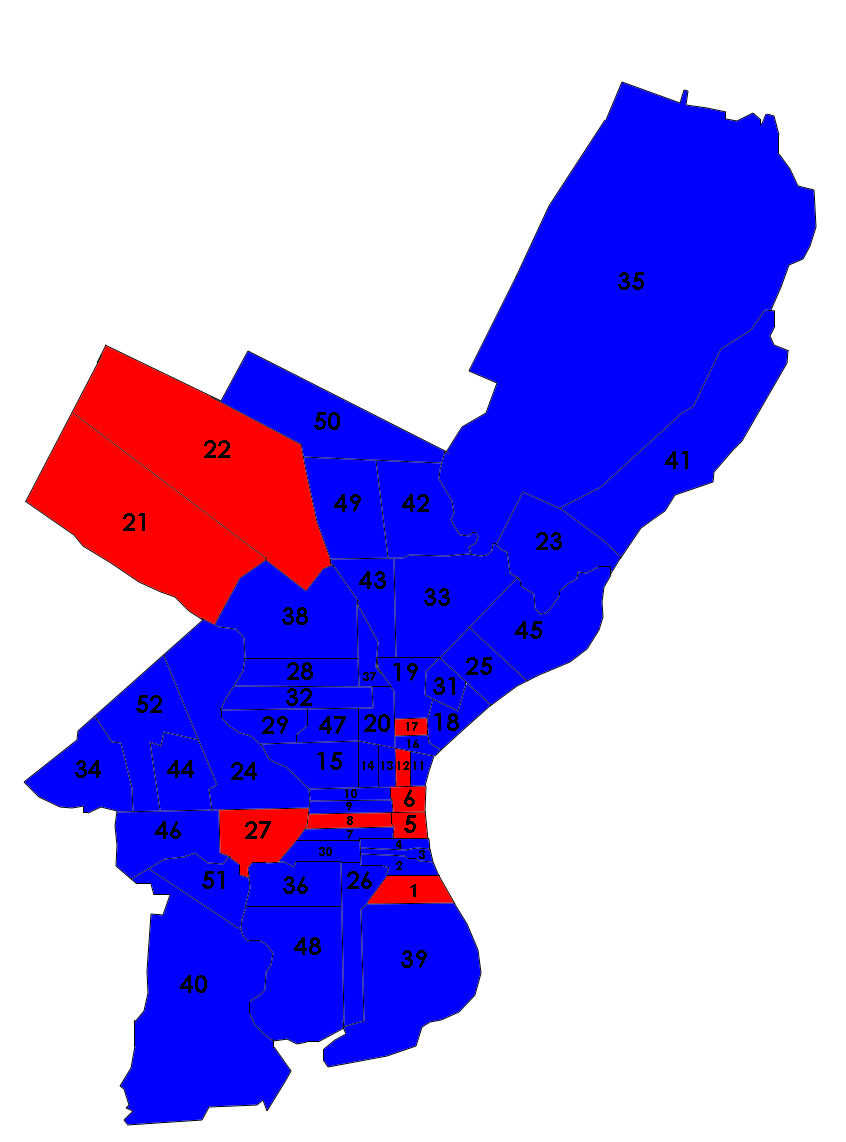
- Ward-level results in the mayor's race, with Dilworth in blue and Longstreth in red
Mayor before election
Joseph S. Clark Jr.
Democratic
Elected mayor
Richardson Dilworth
Democratic

In the mayor's race, incumbent Democrat Joseph S. Clark Jr., who had earlier declared he would serve only one term, did not run for reelection. He instead ran for election to the United States Senate in 1956 and was successful, serving in the Senate for twelve years. For the open seat, Democrat Richardson Dilworth ran against Republican Thacher Longstreth.

After service in World War I and a law degree from Yale, Dilworth practiced law in Philadelphia. He and Clark were allies in the anti-corruption reform effort that had swept the city four years earlier. Dilworth had run for mayor unsuccessfully in 1947, with Clark as his campaign manager. In 1949, he was elected City Treasurer. He resigned that post to run for governor in 1950, but was defeated by Republican John S. Fine. Democratic party leaders had intended Dilworth to be their candidate for mayor again in 1951, but when Clark announced his candidacy, Dilworth agreed to run for district attorney instead. He won, taking just shy of 58% of the vote. In the primary election in May, Dilworth easily defeated his underfunded opponent, William A. Paschall, a local meat dealer.

The Republicans nominated Thacher Longstreth, a 35-year-old advertising executive who had never run for office before. He emerged the victor of a four-way primary contest over George P. Williams (the Republican leadership's preferred candidate), city magistrate James J. Clothier, and Oscar H. Newman, a deputy constable. Longstreth's campaign got off to a rocky start when he broke with the city Republican organization over their failure to elect his preferred candidate, John M. Pomeroy, as chairman of the Republican City Committee. Although he did receive a campaign visit and endorsement from President Dwight D. Eisenhower, Longstreth had little other assistance from the Republican party machine and ran as an "Independent Republican". Republicans still held an edge in voter registration in 1955, but their share of the electorate continued to decline over previous years.

The result was a landslide for Dilworth. In an election with higher than expected turnout, the Democrat took 59% of the vote, a slight increase over the party's tally from the mayoral contest of four years earlier. The Democrats carried 44 of the city's 52 wards. Longstreth conceded defeat early in the evening, and said that he hoped for "an administration that will be good for all people and the progress of our great city". The Philadelphia Inquirer described the result as "a ringing indorsement [sic] of the policies of Mayor Joseph S. Clark Jr., whose Democratic administration was the key issue in the fall ballot drive."

1955 Philadelphia mayoral election
Party	Candidate	Votes	%	±%
Democratic	Richardson Dilworth	423,035	59.30	+1.24
Republican	Thacher Longstreth	290,329	40.70	−1.24

== District Attorney ==
1955 Philadelphia District Attorney election
Nominee	Victor H. Blanc	Wilhelm F. Knauer
Party	Democratic	Republican
Popular vote	425,362	282,176
Percentage	60.19%	39.81%
District Attorney before election
Richardson Dilworth
Democratic
Elected District Attorney
Victor H. Blanc
Democratic

For the open office of district attorney, vacated by Dilworth when he ran for mayor, the Democrats nominated city councilman Victor H. Blanc against the Republicans' Wilhelm F. Knauer. Blanc, a veteran of both World Wars and former assistant district attorney, had been elected to city council in an at-large seat in 1951. During his time on the council, he was in charge of an investigation into corruption in construction at Philadelphia International Airport. Knauer, a state deputy attorney general, was a long-time Republican party leader. His wife, Virginia Knauer, would later be elected to city council. As in the mayor's race, the Democrats were victorious, and Blanc was elected. His vote totals led the Democratic ticket, exceeding even Dilworth's numbers.

1955 Philadelphia district attorney election
Party	Candidate	Votes	%	±%
Democratic	Victor H. Blanc	425,362	60.19	+2.25
Republican	Wilhelm F. Knauer	282,176	39.81	−2.25

== City Council ==
Philadelphians elected a seventeen-member city council in 1955, with ten members representing districts of the city, and the remaining seven being elected at-large. For the at-large seats, each political party could nominate five candidates, and voters could only vote for five, with the result being that the majority party could only take five of the seven seats, leaving two for the minority party. The Democrats' citywide dominance continued into the city council races, as they retained control of nine of ten districts and five of seven at-large seats.

In the at-large races, the two incumbent Democratic candidates, Victor E. Moore and Paul D'Ortona, led the ticket. Three other Democrats were also elected: John F. Byrne Sr., who had previously been councilman for the 10th district; Henry W. Sawyer, a civil rights lawyer; and Marshall L. Shepard, a clergyman who had served as Commissioner of Records. On the Republican side, incumbent at-large councilman Louis Schwartz was re-elected. The other Republican incumbent, Donald C. Rubel, who had won a special election as an independent Republican backed by Democrats, lost his spot to Thomas M. Foglietta, a young lawyer and son of former councilman Michael Foglietta. Also losing bids for the Republican at-large seats were real estate assessor F. Raymond Heuges and former magistrate Hobson R. Reynolds.

At the district level, Democratic incumbents Thomas I. Guerin (district 1), Harry Norwitch (district 3), Samuel Rose (district 4), Raymond Pace Alexander (district 5), Michael J. Towey (district 6), James Tate (district 7), and Charles M. Finley (district 9) were all reelected. In the 2nd district, Democrat Gaetano Giordano took the seat from Republican David Zwanetz, who was nominated when incumbent Republican William M. Phillips did not run for reelection. In the 8th, the Republicans evened the score as state representative Wilbur H. Hamilton narrowly defeated Democratic incumbent Constance Dallas. Hamilton's brother, Robert S. Hamilton, had lost to Dallas four years earlier. In the final district council seat, the 10th, Democrat John M. McDevitt was elected to the seat previously held by Byrne. The Inquirer called the Democratic downballot victories "a rebuke to Republican leaders who sought to tie in the campaign with the 1956 Presidential election," and credited the Democrats with campaigning "on the theory that the issues were purely local."

At-large vote share by party
1. Democratic (59.8%)
2. Republican (40.2%)

1955 Philadelphia city council election, at large
Party	Candidate	Votes	%	±%
Democratic	Victor E. Moore (incumbent)	422,297	12.01	+0.43
Democratic	Paul D'Ortona (incumbent)	422,234	12.01	+0.47
Democratic	John F. Byrne Sr.	420,556	11.96	–
Democratic	Henry W. Sawyer	419,835	11.94	–
Democratic	Marshall L. Shepard	418,001	11.89	–
Republican	Thomas M. Foglietta	286,334	8.15	–
Republican	Louis Schwartz	283,300	8.06	−0.40
Republican	F. Raymond Heuges	281,250	8.00	–
Republican	Donald C. Rubel	281,230	8.00	–
Republican	Hobson R. Reynolds	279,963	7.96	–

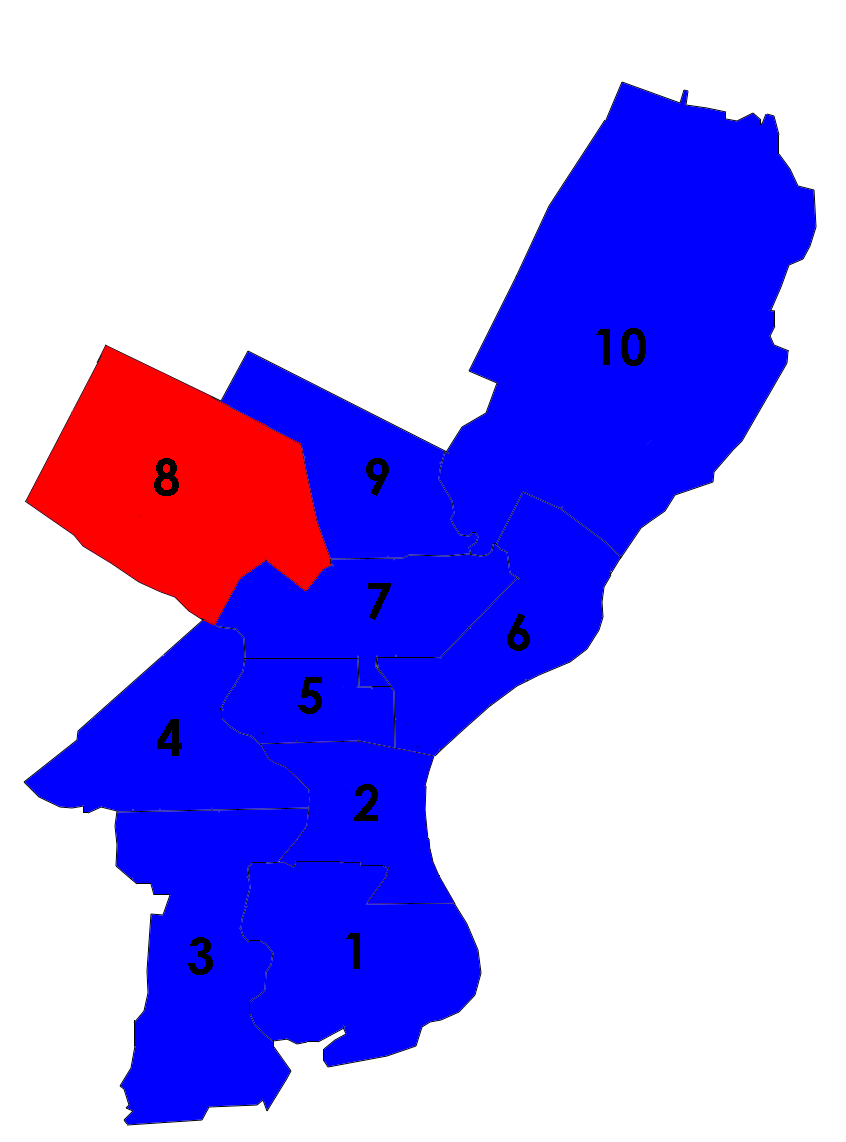
Philadelphia city council districts after the 1955 election (Democrats in blue, Republicans in red)

1955 Philadelphia city council election, district 1
Party	Candidate	Votes	%	±%
Democratic	Thomas I. Guerin (incumbent)	43,320	62.22	+4.44
Republican	David A. Kraftsow	26,302	37.78	−4.44

1955 Philadelphia city council election, district 2
Party	Candidate	Votes	%	±%
Democratic	Gaetano Giordano	40,524	58.75	+17.35
Republican	David Zwanetz	28,453	41.25	−17.35

1955 Philadelphia city council election, district 3
Party	Candidate	Votes	%	±%
Democratic	Harry Norwitch (incumbent)	44,079	59.59	−2.18
Republican	Joseph P. McSweeny	29,896	40.41	+2.18

1955 Philadelphia city council election, district 4
Party	Candidate	Votes	%	±%
Democratic	Samuel Rose (incumbent)	44,106	68.58	+6.58
Republican	David E. Brodsky	20,203	31.42	−6.58

1955 Philadelphia city council election, district 5
Party	Candidate	Votes	%	±%
Democratic	Raymond Pace Alexander (incumbent)	36,959	70.27	+12.17
Republican	William Lynch	15,634	29.73	−12.17

1955 Philadelphia city council election, district 6
Party	Candidate	Votes	%	±%
Democratic	Michael J. Towey (incumbent)	41,866	56.79	+1.74
Republican	Frederick W. Schmidt	31,857	43.21	−1.74

1955 Philadelphia city council election, district 7
Party	Candidate	Votes	%	±%
Democratic	James Tate (incumbent)	43,921	62.51	+0.53
Republican	Charles K. Miller	26,341	37.49	−0.53

1955 Philadelphia city council election, district 8
Party	Candidate	Votes	%	±%
Republican	Wilbur H. Hamilton	30,086	49.95	+4.06
Democratic	Constance Dallas	29,630	49.19	−4.92
Constitution	J. Warren Keel	520	0.86	+0.86

1955 Philadelphia city council election, district 9
Party	Candidate	Votes	%	±%
Democratic	Charles M. Finley (incumbent)	49,750	61.61	−1.77
Republican	Arthur M. Soll	30,997	38.39	+1.77

1955 Philadelphia city council election, district 10
Party	Candidate	Votes	%	±%
Democratic	John M. McDevitt	50,126	54.54	−5.82
Republican	Louis R. Iannarelli	41,787	45.46	+5.82

== Other offices and ballot measures ==
The Democrats' success continued in the down-ballot races. Democratic city commissioners Maurice S. Osser and Thomas P. McHenry were reelected as was Republican Walter I. Davidson. William M. Lennox was reelected county sheriff and Joseph A. Scanlon was reelected clerk of the court of quarter sessions (a court whose jurisdiction is now exercised by the court of common pleas). The Democrats also took four of the seven magisterial district judge positions up for election that year (a local court, the duties of which are now performed by the Philadelphia Municipal Court). The ballot contained two referendums authorizing the city to take loans for construction of medical facilities, streets, sewers, playgrounds, and other civic improvements. They passed with overwhelming support, each tallying 84% affirmative votes.

1955 Philadelphia city commissioners election
Party	Candidate	Votes	%	±%
Democratic	Maurice S. Osser (incumbent)	421,134	29.86	+0.99
Democratic	Thomas P. McHenry (incumbent)	421,054	29.86	+0.98
Republican	Walter I. Davidson	284,602	20.18	−0.96
Republican	John J. McGarvey	283,439	20.01	−1.11

1955 Philadelphia sheriff election
Party	Candidate	Votes	%	±%
Democratic	William M. Lennox	420,206	59.81	+1.99
Republican	J. Russell Gibbons	282,359	40.19	−1.99

1955 Philadelphia clerk of courts election
Party	Candidate	Votes	%	±%
Democratic	Joseph A. Scanlon	415,346	59.85	+2.20
Republican	Nicholas A. Cipriani	278,674	40.15	−2.20

== See also ==
- List of members of Philadelphia City Council since 1952

== Sources ==
Book

- Bulletin Almanac 1956. Philadelphia, Pennsylvania: The Philadelphia Bulletin. 1956. OCLC 8641470.
- Mayer, Michael F. (2010). The Eisenhower Years. New York, New York: Facts on File, Inc. ISBN 978-0-8160-5387-2.

Newspapers

- "Dallas Loses by 457, Party's Lone Casualty". The Philadelphia Inquirer. November 9, 1955.
- "Dilworth Landslide Sinks GOP in Phila". Delaware County Daily Times. November 9, 1955.
- "Emotions Tell Vote Story at Party Quarters". The Philadelphia Inquirer. November 9, 1955.
- "Longstreth Snubs GOP, But Gets Party Backing". Delaware County Daily Times. June 10, 1955.
- "Schwartz, Rubel, Foglietta Victors". The Philadelphia Inquirer. May 18, 1955.
- "Voters Approve 2 Phila. Loans For Projects". The Philadelphia Inquirer. November 9, 1955.
- "City Results At a Glance". The Philadelphia Inquirer. November 10, 1955 – via Newspapers.com.
- Loftus, William C. (May 18, 1955). "Longstreth, Dilworth Philadelphia Winners". Delaware County Daily Times.
- Miller, Joseph H. (November 9, 1951). "Democrats win by 122,000". The Philadelphia Inquirer.
- Neal, Steve (January 15, 1990). "Political Giant Joseph Clark Dead At 88". The Philadelphia Inquirer. Archived from the original on October 20, 2013.
