= Raymond Pace Alexander =

Pennsylvania-born African American judge (1897–1974)

- Alexander in 1943

Member of the Philadelphia City Council from the 5th district
- In office January 7, 1952 – January 5, 1959
- Preceded by: Eugene J. Sullivan
- Succeeded by: Thomas McIntosh

Judge of the Pennsylvania Court of Common Pleas No. 4
- In office January 5, 1959 – November 1974
- Preceded by: John Morgan Davis

Personal details
- Born: Raymond Pace Alexander; October 13, 1897 Philadelphia, Pennsylvania, U.S.
- Died: November 24, 1974 (aged 77) Philadelphia, Pennsylvania, U.S.
- Resting place: West Laurel Hill Cemetery
- Party: Democratic (1937–1940, after 1947)
- Other political affiliations: Republican (before 1937, 1940–1947)
- Spouse: Sadie Tanner Mossell (m. 1923)
- Children: 2
- Education: University of Pennsylvania (BS); Columbia University; Harvard University (LLB)
- Occupation: Politician; civil rights attorney; judge

Raymond Pace Alexander (October 13, 1897 – November 24, 1974) was an American civil rights leader, lawyer, politician, and the first African American judge appointed to the Pennsylvania Court of Common Pleas. Born and raised in Philadelphia, he became the first black graduate of the Wharton School of Business in 1920. After graduation from Harvard Law School in 1923, Alexander became one of the leading civil rights attorneys in Philadelphia. He gained prominence as a black lawyer willing to fight for equal rights in the Berwyn desegregation case and represented black defendants in other high-profile cases, including the Trenton Six, a group of black men arrested for murder in Trenton, New Jersey.

Alexander began his involvement in politics with unsuccessful runs for a judgeship on the Court of Common Pleas in 1933 and 1937. In 1949 he was considered by President Harry S. Truman for a seat on the United States Court of Appeals for the Third Circuit. He finally won a seat on the Philadelphia City Council in 1951. After two terms on the city council, Alexander was appointed to a seat on the Court of Common Pleas and was re-elected to a ten-year term as a judge in 1959. He continued to work for racial equality throughout his time in the municipal government. Alexander assumed senior status at mandatory retirement age in 1969 and died in 1974. His legacy is honored by a professorship at the University of Pennsylvania.

== Early life and education ==
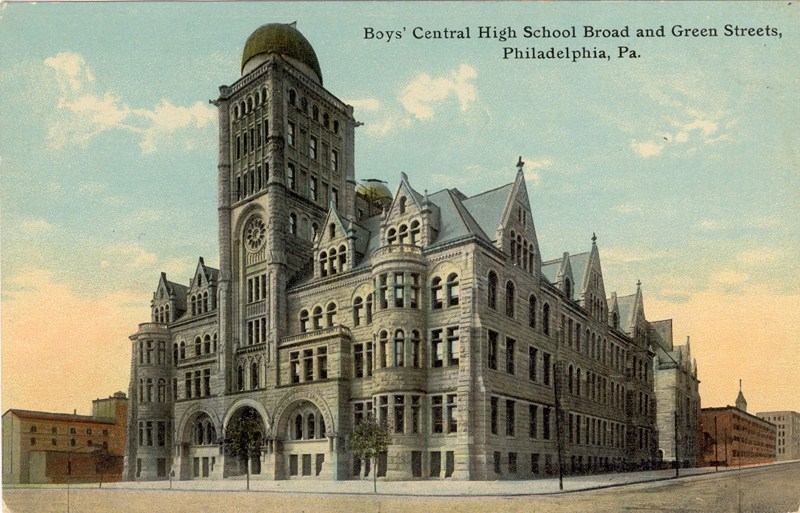
Alexander graduated from Philadelphia's Central High School in 1917

Alexander was born into a working-class black family in Philadelphia, Pennsylvania, on October 13, 1897. His parents, like many African Americans in the 1860s and 1870s, had left the rural South looking for economic opportunities and an escape from the violence that accompanied the Jim Crow segregation system in place there. His father, Hillard Boone Alexander, was born a slave in Mecklenburg County, Virginia, and was the son of the plantation owner. He migrated to Philadelphia with his brother, Samuel, in 1880. That same year, Raymond's mother, Virginia Pace, also migrated to Philadelphia with her brother, John Schollie Pace; they had been born slaves in Essex County, Virginia. Hillard and Virginia married in Philadelphia in 1882.

The family, like most of the city's black population, lived in the Seventh Ward in what is called Center City today. W. E. B. Du Bois called the area in which the Alexanders lived the "fair and comfortable" part of the neighborhood. Alexander's father and uncle were "riding masters" who gave horseback riding lessons to wealthy white people in Philadelphia and its suburbs along the Main Line, but by 1915 the emergence of the automobile era led the business to decline and ultimately fail.

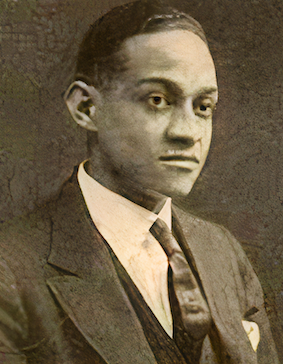
Alexander as a college student in 1920

In 1909, Alexander's mother died of pneumonia. Although Alexander immediately began working to help support the family, his father felt unable to provide adequate care for the children and sent Alexander and his three siblings (including his sister Virginia) to live with their aunt and uncle, Georgia and John Pace, in a growing black community in North Philadelphia. The Paces were a working-class family as well, and so with even more mouths to feed, Alexander continued working through grade school and high school to help support himself and his siblings. Jobs he held during those years included working on the docks unloading fish, selling newspapers, and owning a bootblack stand where he worked six days per week. Alexander also worked at the Metropolitan Opera House in North Philadelphia for six years, beginning when he was 16 years old. Later, looking back on his time at the Opera House, Alexander said that it had "opened a new world for me", and he credited that environment with giving him "some of the smoothness and culture which characterizes my later years".

Alexander attended Central High School and graduated in 1917, delivering a speech "The Future of the American Negro", at the commencement ceremony. He enrolled at the University of Pennsylvania on a merit scholarship and became the first black graduate of the Wharton School of Business in 1920. He then enrolled at Harvard Law School. While there, Alexander earned a living by working as a teaching assistant during the school year. In the summers, he took classes for a master's degree in political science at Columbia University, though he did not finish the degree. At Columbia, Alexander supported himself by working as a porter for the Delaware, Lackawanna and Western Railroad. While still in law school, Alexander brought his first discrimination lawsuit, suing Madison Square Garden for refusing him entry on account of his race, a violation of New York's equal rights law. As he was not yet admitted to the bar, Alexander hired black Harvard Law School graduate attorney James D. McLendon Jr., to represent him.

== Legal career ==
Alexander graduated from Harvard Law in 1923. That same year, he married his former Penn classmate Sadie Tanner Mossell. Mossell was the granddaughter of Benjamin Tucker Tanner and in 1927 became the first black woman to earn a law degree from the University of Pennsylvania. They had two daughters, Rae and Mary. He passed the Pennsylvania bar exam in 1923, becoming one of a few black lawyers in the state. Despite his credentials, Alexander had difficulty finding a job in Philadelphia after graduation. Ultimately, he took a position in the law office of John R. K. Scott, a white Republican former congressman with a small office in the city. Shortly thereafter, he opened his own office with a focus on representing black people.

He soon rose to prominence in Philadelphia's black community. In 1924, he represented Louise Thomas, a black woman accused of murdering a black policeman. After she was convicted and sentenced to death, Alexander secured her a new trial. In a new trial before the same judge, Thomas was found not guilty, which Alexander's biographer, David A. Canton, described as "a landmark in Pennsylvania legal history". That same year, he filed an anti-discrimination lawsuit against a movie theater owner in Philadelphia who refused admission to black ticketholders. He lost the case, but it nonetheless raised his profile as a black lawyer willing to fight for equal rights. Around this time, Alexander began to identify with the black intellectual "New Negro" movement, which advocated self-help, racial pride, and protest against injustice. He also joined the National Bar Association (NBA), an association of black lawyers that had formed when its founding members were denied membership in the American Bar Association. Through the NBA, Alexander began to use political protest as well as legal action in the struggle for equal rights. His firm, which now included his wife and Maceo W. Hubbard, relocated to a new building at 19th and Chestnut Streets.

=== Berwyn desegregation case ===
In 1932, Alexander became involved with the Berwyn School Fight to desegregate the schools in Berwyn, Pennsylvania, a suburb of Philadelphia. After Easttown Township built a new elementary school, neighboring Tredyffrin Township closed its school and paid to send its students to Easttown (the Berwyn region included parts of both townships). Easttown converted its old (and smaller) school building into one "for the instruction of certain people", which in practice meant all black students in the district, segregating the previously integrated schools. As a result, 212 African American students began to boycott the public schools. The families hired Alexander to press the issue in court.

With the assistance of the National Association for the Advancement of Colored People (NAACP), Alexander negotiated with the school board, attempting to end the boycott, but the stalemate continued into 1933. Tensions increased as the state Attorney General, William A. Schnader, ordered the black parents prosecuted for refusing to send their children to school. Some refused to pay bail and stayed in prison as a protest. Alexander approved of the strategy, while the NAACP thought it too confrontational; they also objected to Alexander's acceptance of help from International Labor Defense lawyers, fearing association with the far-left group.

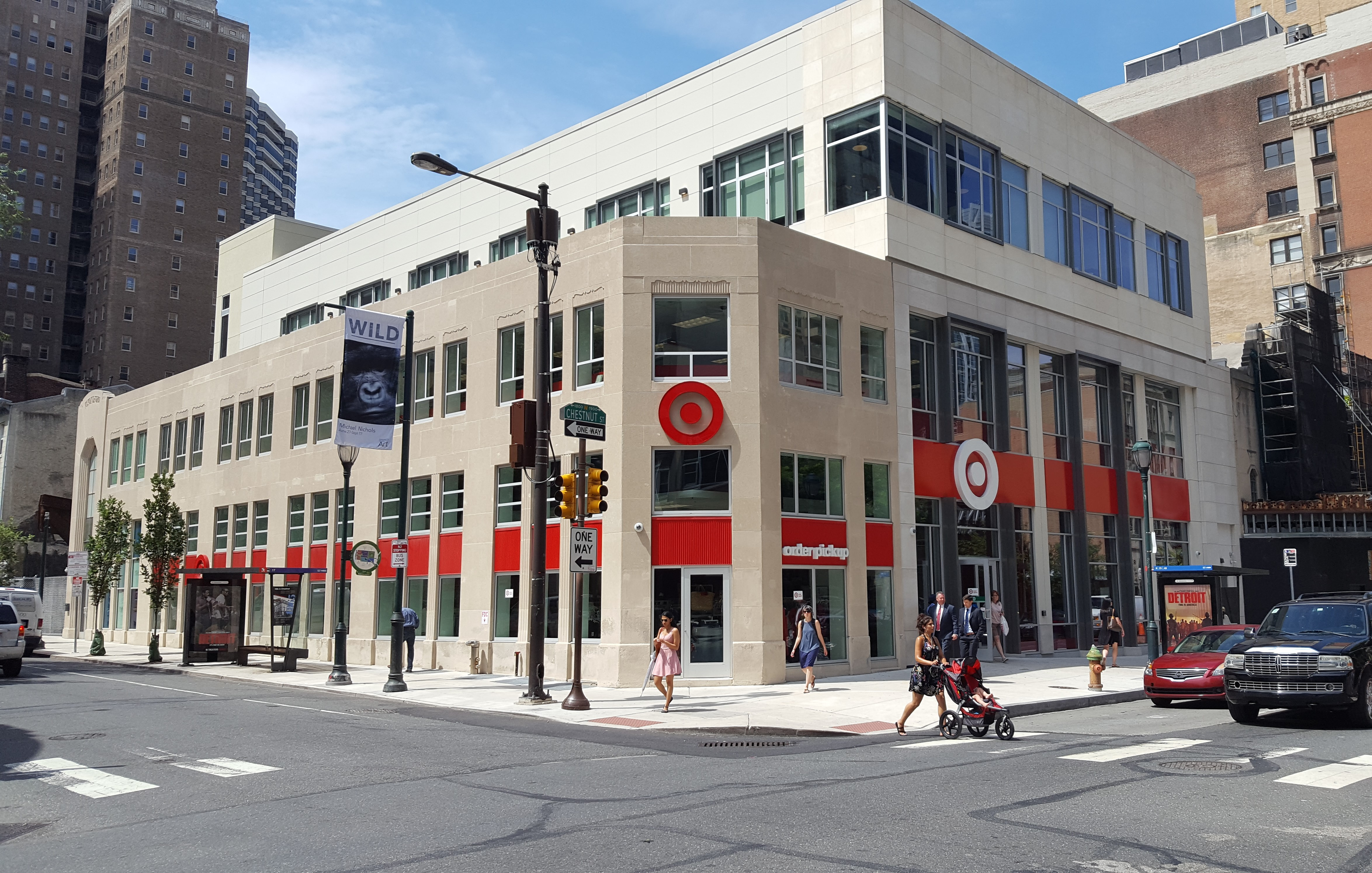
Present-day site of Alexander's law office (now a Target)

As the boycott dragged on into 1934, groups organized protest marches in Philadelphia. Schnader, now running for governor, promised to find a solution. Alexander and others credited Schnader's newfound support for their campaign to his recognition of the growing influence of black voters in Pennsylvania. By June, the school board agreed to allow students to be admitted to the two schools on a race-neutral basis, and the parents ended their boycott. The following year, the state passed a strengthened equal rights bill that covered all public accommodations, including schools, and allowed private lawyers to sue segregated businesses. It was introduced by state representative Hobson R. Reynolds, a black Republican from Philadelphia.

=== Growing prestige ===
Alexander rose to national prominence in the black legal community after the Berwyn case, and he began to speak around the country at NBA events, serving as the organization's president from 1933 to 1935. In 1942, he represented Thomas Mattox, a black teenager, as Mattox fought extradition to Georgia where he was accused of assaulting a white man. Alexander argued that Mattox would not receive a fair trial in the South, and the judge agreed, quashing the extradition attempt. He also represented Corrine Sykes, a 23-year-old black maid who was charged with murdering her white employer. This time, Alexander was unsuccessful, as the jury disregarded his arguments that Sykes was mentally impaired and found her guilty. After appeals to the Supreme Court of the United States were denied, Sykes was executed in 1946.

=== Trenton Six ===
In 1948, Alexander became involved with the case of the Trenton Six, a group of black men arrested in Trenton, New Jersey, accused of robbery and murder. Trenton police induced confessions from five of the six, and all were convicted by an all-white jury and sentenced to death. The Civil Rights Congress (CRC), the legal arm of the Communist Party USA, represented three of the men during their appeal; the NAACP Legal Defense and Educational Fund, at the request of their chief counsel, Thurgood Marshall, hired Alexander to represent two of the others. In 1949, the Supreme Court of New Jersey granted the men a new trial but prohibited the CRC from representing any of the defendants because they found that the group had unfairly influenced jury pools through the news media.

In the 1951 re-trial, Alexander established that the police had manufactured evidence in order to secure a quick conviction and quiet public concerns about the crime wave then rippling through Trenton. The judge also ruled out the confessions, which were proved to have been coerced. After a lengthy trial, four were acquitted and two convicted, with the jury recommending life imprisonment. Though not a complete victory, Alexander had demonstrated his skill as a lawyer and saved the lives of his clients, while managing to distance himself from the CRC and other communist groups, an important consideration in the Cold War atmosphere.

== Political and judicial career ==
=== Seeking a judicial nomination ===
By the 1930s, Alexander's civil rights activity led him to become involved in local politics. At that time, Republicans dominated Philadelphia's political scene, and Alexander ran for a seat on the Court of Common Pleas as a Republican in 1933, but withdrew before the election, a decision the Philadelphia Tribune reported was due to ill health. He grew frustrated with the Republican party organization, which offered only the lowest-level city patronage jobs to blacks. Nonetheless, he saw the Republicans as the best chance for African American advancement in the city and lobbied the party leaders to nominate a black lawyer—preferably him—for one of the judicial seats up for election in 1937. He found little support, and lost the primary election to the three party-endorsed candidates: Byron A. Milner, Clare G. Fenerty, and John Robert Jones. This left the Republicans, like the Democrats, with an all-white ticket again in 1937.

After the election, Alexander joined many black Americans of the era in shifting his allegiance to the Democratic Party. By 1940, however, Alexander decided that the Democrats were no more likely than the Republicans to elect a black judge and, dissatisfied with the New Deal and the party's lack of action on civil rights causes, he returned to the Republicans. Sadie Alexander had followed her husband's political shift to the Democrats and remained there, and in 1946 President Harry S. Truman appointed her to his Committee on Civil Rights. Alexander rejoined the Democratic Party in 1947 and campaigned for Truman the following year.

Following Truman's election, Alexander lobbied to be appointed to a federal district court seat. Around the same time, he was rumored to be among the candidates for a seat on the United States Court of Appeals for the Third Circuit, but the position went to William H. Hastie instead, making Hastie the first black federal appeals court judge in 1950. Canton suggests that Alexander's frequent party-switching and perceived disloyalty to the Democratic Party may have harmed his chances at a nomination. After his efforts at a seat on the federal bench failed, Alexander sought a foreign service appointment, expressing a particular desire to be U.S. Ambassador to Haiti or Ethiopia; he was unsuccessful.

=== City Council ===
By the late 1940s, Alexander joined the ranks of a growing reform movement in the Philadelphia Democratic Party. The group was led by Joseph S. Clark Jr. and Richardson Dilworth, former Republicans who had left their party over machine politics, and James A. Finnegan, a Democratic organization leader who saw that a growing desire for civil service reform and good government could lift his party from its perpetual minority status by attracting independent voters. After reformers passed a new city charter in 1951, Alexander won the Democratic primary to represent the 5th district on the City Council. At the general election that November, Alexander won easily, taking 58% of the vote against incumbent Republican Eugene J. Sullivan. Democrats swept nine of the ten council districts and elected Clark mayor, ending 67 years of Republican rule in the city.

Alexander's campaign for council stressed messages of merit selection for city workers as well as increasing the number of black employees. The promise of civil service reform gained the confidence of black voters, who had traditionally been left out of the Republican patronage system. In 1953, Alexander introduced a resolution in council demanding that the then all-white Girard College admit black students, or else lose its tax-exempt status. The case wended its way through the courts, led by civil rights activist Cecil B. Moore; the school eventually desegregated, but not until 1968, long after Alexander had left City Council.

He was re-elected in 1955 with an increased share of the vote, receiving 70% of the vote to Republican nominee William Lynch's 30%. On the city council, Alexander continued to press the cause of civil service reform. In 1954, he successfully opposed the efforts of fellow Democrats James Tate and Michael J. Towey to weaken the civil service reforms of the new charter. Two years later, Alexander remained opposed, but the amendments' proponents found the required two-thirds vote in Council to make it on to the ballot for popular approval. A referendum on the subject failed in a vote that April.

=== Judge ===
In 1958, Rep. Earl Chudoff, who represented the 4th district in the U.S. House of Representatives, resigned his seat after he was elected to be a judge on the Court of Common Pleas No. 1. In the ensuing special election for the congressional seat, as the 4th district was about 75% black, the Democratic organization wanted a black candidate to replace Chudoff, who was white. They settled on Robert N. C. Nix Sr., a local attorney. Alexander also announced his candidacy for the seat; according to his biographer, Alexander was less interested in serving in Congress than in using the leverage of a primary challenge to force the party organization to back him for a judgeship. The ploy was successful. Alexander soon dropped out of the race and Nix was elected. Governor George M. Leader appointed Alexander to be a judge on the Court of Common Pleas No. 4, to fill a vacancy caused by the resignation of John Morgan Davis, who was elected lieutenant governor in 1958. Governor Leader was initially hesitant to appoint Alexander as it was traditional for the governor to appoint judges from a list of recommendations by the judiciary committee of the Philadelphia Bar Association; however, there was "adequate precedent" for appointing a qualified judge not recommended by the committee, and Rep. William J. Green Jr. used his considerable political influence to ensure Alexander's appointment. On January 5, 1959, Alexander was sworn in, the first black judge to sit on the Court of Common Pleas, and in the election later that year, he won a full ten-year term on the court.

In Alexander's first year on the court, he was disturbed by the high number of black defendants he saw and sought to remedy the problem by creating an alternate probation system for first-time offenders called the "Spiritual Rehabilitation Program", with funding and logistical assistance coming from local churches and synagogues. The program received national attention for its innovative approach to crime but failed to gain much support outside of black churches. He also found himself dragged back into the political realm when Republicans demanded that a grand jury be convened to investigate Democratic corruption in City Hall; Alexander rejected their petition.

Alexander continued to be active as a civil rights leader but clashed with younger activists over the methods best suited to achieving their goals. In 1962, for example, while Alexander urged increased black representation on the Philadelphia Council for Community Advancement, he disagreed with NAACP branch president Cecil B. Moore's call for a boycott of corporate donors to the group. While supporting Martin Luther King Jr.'s civil disobedience campaigns in the South in 1964, he believed some measures hurt the cause by alienating white voters; he called on black leaders to "cease the needless demonstrations, stall-ins, uncalled lie downs especially in the North which bring discredit upon us". In 1966, he condemned the Black Power movement as "a hazardous and meaningless catch-phrase which is as dangerous and divisive for the Negro as the white racism which we have opposed for so long".

Despite differences with Moore and others, Alexander continued to work toward his lifelong goal of racial equality. In 1969, he called for the city to hire more black employees, and in 1972 penned an article in The Philadelphia Inquirer calling for the Philadelphia Police Department to do the same. Meanwhile, he spoke out against black separatism, calling it "reverse racism". His focus increasingly was on how economic issues exacerbated racial problems, and he called for a universal basic income and affirmative action to remedy the problem. Nevertheless, according to Canton, by the 1970s young blacks viewed Alexander and his generation of civil rights leaders as "out of touch and too dependent on the white elite".

== Death and legacy ==
Having reached the mandatory retirement age of 70, Alexander was forced to retire from the court at the end of 1969, but stayed on as a senior judge. On the night of November 25, 1974, Alexander was found dead of a heart attack in his judicial chambers. Leon Sullivan officiated Alexander's funeral at Philadelphia's First Baptist Church, after which the judge was buried in West Laurel Hill Cemetery in Bala Cynwyd, Pennsylvania. In 2007, the University of Pennsylvania endowed the Raymond Pace and Sadie Tanner Mossell Alexander Professorship, devoted to the study of civil rights and race relations. Their daughters donated portraits of their parents to the law school to coincide with the announcement.

== Sources ==
Books

- Bulletin Almanac 1952. Philadelphia, Pennsylvania: The Philadelphia Bulletin. OCLC 8641470.
- Bulletin Almanac 1956. Philadelphia, Pennsylvania: The Philadelphia Bulletin. OCLC 8641470.
- Canton, David A. (2010). Raymond Pace Alexander: A New Negro Lawyer Fights for Civil Rights in Philadelphia. Jackson, Mississippi: University Press of Mississippi. ISBN 978-1-60473-426-3.
- Freedman, Robert L. (1963). A Report on Politics in Philadelphia. Cambridge, Massachusetts: Joint Center for Urban Studies of the Massachusetts Institute of Technology and Harvard University. OCLC 1690059.
- Knepper, Cathy D. (2011). Jersey Justice: The Story of the Trenton Six. Piscataway, New Jersey: Rutgers University Press. ISBN 978-0-8135-5127-2.
- Mack, Kenneth W. (2012). Representing the Race: The Creation of the Civil Rights Lawyer. Cambridge, Massachusetts: Harvard University Press. ISBN 978-0-67404-687-0.
- Petshek, Kirk R. (1973). The Challenge of Urban Reform. Philadelphia: Temple University Press. ISBN 978-0-87722-058-9.
- Reichly, James (1959). The Art of Government: Reform and Organization Politics in Philadelphia. A report to the Fund for the Republic. New York: Fund for the Republic. OCLC 994205.

Journals

- "A Philadelphia Lawyer". Wharton Alumni Magazine. Spring 2007. Archived from the original on February 26, 2010.
- Canton, David A. (Spring 2008). "A Dress Rehearsal for the Modern Civil Rights Movement: Raymond Pace Alexander and the Berwyn, Pennsylvania, School Desegregation Case, 1932–1935". Pennsylvania History: A Journal of Mid-Atlantic Studies. 75 (2): 260–284. doi:10.2307/27778832. JSTOR 27778832. S2CID 142251580.
- Fleming, James (October 1940). "A Philadelphia Lawyer". The Sphinx. 26 (3): 5–7, 39–40.
- Kranzel, Isador; Klinek, Eric (October 2009). "Political influence in Philadelphia judicial appointments: Abraham L. Freedman's account". Pennsylvania Magazine of History and Biography. 133 (4). University of Pennsylvania Press: 349–387. JSTOR 40543695.
- Mack, Kenneth W. (June 2006). "Law and Mass Politics in the Making of the Civil Rights Lawyer, 1931–1941". The Journal of American History. 93 (1): 37–62. doi:10.2307/4486059. JSTOR 4486059.
- Maule, Bradley (May 8, 2014). "Paced for Growth at 1900 Chestnut". Hidden City Philadelphia.
- Murray, Florence (December 1945). "The Negro and Civil Liberties during World War II". Social Forces. 24 (2): 211–216. doi:10.2307/2572539. JSTOR 2572539.
- Thorne, Roger D. (2007). "The School Segregation Fight". Tredyffrin Easttown Historical Society History Quarterly. 44 (1&2): 65–67.

Newspapers

- "Party Slates Sweep Primary; Meehan Defeated by Watson; Kelly Forces Swamp Stack". Philadelphia Inquirer. September 15, 1937. pp. 1–2, 10 – via Newspapers.com.
- Miller, Joseph H. (February 18, 1954). "Council Unit OKs 6-Point Plan to 'Wreck' Charter". The Philadelphia Inquirer. p. 1 – via Newspapers.com.
- Schraga, Saul (February 24, 1956a). "Council Puts Ripper Up in Primary". The Philadelphia Inquirer. pp. 1, 11 – via Newspapers.com.
- Schraga, Saul (April 25, 1956b). "Voters Beat Proposal To Rip Up Charter". The Philadelphia Inquirer. pp. 1, 4 – via Newspapers.com.
- Miller, Joseph H. (November 4, 1959). "Dilworth Re-Elected; Eagen Wins". The Philadelphia Inquirer. pp. 1, 3 – via Newspapers.com.
- Miller, Joseph H. (May 9, 1969). "Democrats, Republicans to Select Slates for May 20 Primary on Monday". Philadelphia Inquirer. p. 5 – via Newspapers.com.
- Mann, Jim (November 25, 1974). "R. Alexander Dies, Fighter For His Race". Philadelphia Inquirer. pp. 1-A, 2-A – via Newspapers.com.
- Stone, Chuck (November 25, 1974). "A Dedicated Fighter Dies". Philadelphia Daily News. pp. 3, 10 – via Newspapers.com.
- Avery, Ron (October 23, 1996). "Woman's Execution 50 years Ago Still a Hot Issue". Philadelphia Daily News. p. 7 – via Newspapers.com.

Interview

- Alexander, Sadie Tanner Mossell (October 20, 1976). "Interview with Sadie Alexander". Walter Massey Phillips Oral Histories (Interview). Interviewed by Walter Massey Phillips. Philadelphia: Temple University Special Collections Oral Histories Repository. Archived from the original on August 1, 2021.

Website

- Leong, Jeanne; Teitelbaum, Larry (February 16, 2007). "Penn Law School Establishes Civil Rights Chair With Help of $1 Million Grant From Commonwealth of Pennsylvania". Penn Today. University of Pennsylvania.
