= Walter Davidson =

Walter Davidson may refer to:

- Walter Davidson, Sr. (1876–1942), founder of Harley-Davidson
- Walter Edward Davidson (1859–1923), British colonial governor (Newfoundland, New South Wales)
- Walter I. Davidson (1895–1985), Philadelphia businessman, civic leader, and politician
- Walter Davidson (Canadian politician), member of the Legislative Assembly of British Columbia

== See also ==
- Walter Davison (1581–1608?), poet
- Walther Davisson (1885–1973), German musician
