= 1958 Philadelphia City Council special election =

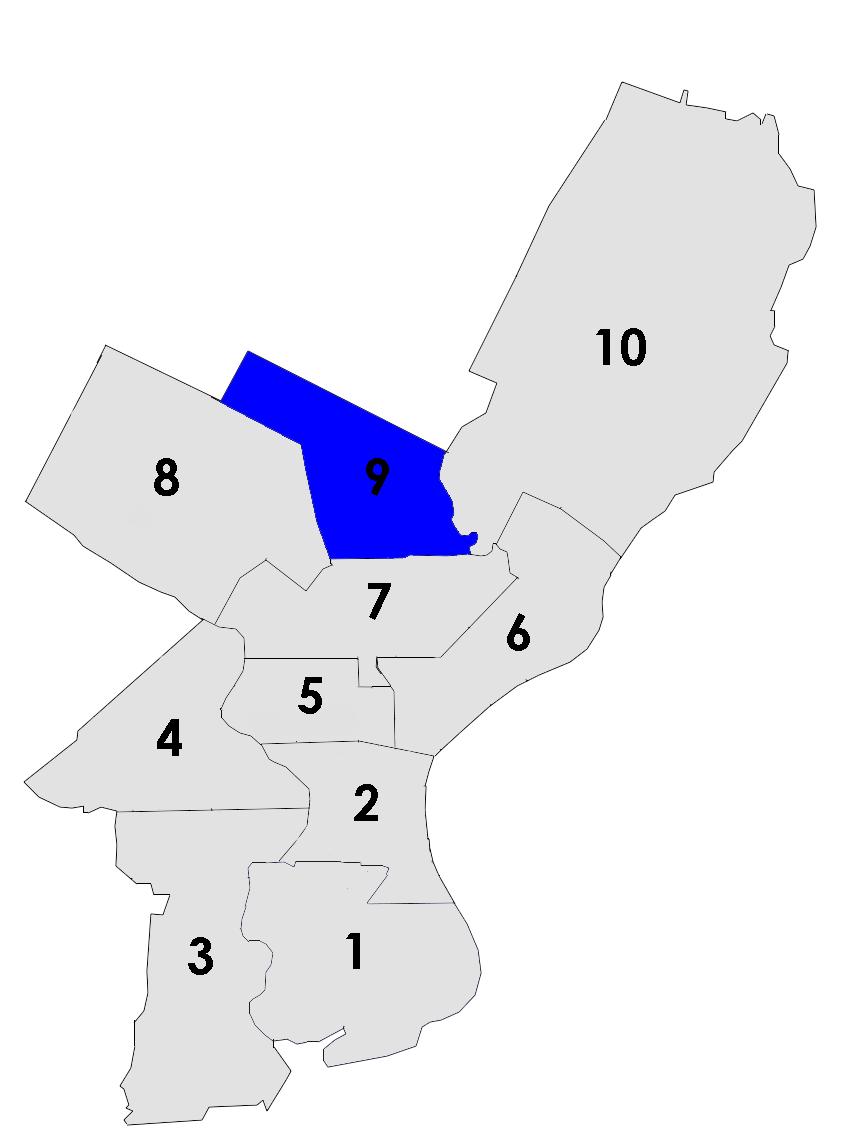
The 9th councilmanic district in 1958

Philadelphia's City Council special election of 1958 was held to fill the 9th district seat vacated by Democrat Charles M. Finley when he died in office. Democrat Henry P. Carr defeated Republican Elizabeth Page Hanna for the seat.

== Background ==
Since 1951, insurance broker Charles M. Finley had represented the 9th district, which covered Oak Lane, Olney, and Logan. In August 1958, he died of a heart attack while vacationing in Margate, New Jersey.

With limited time to fill the seat, the parties selected the candidates directly rather than holding a primary. Democratic ward leaders in the district chose U.S. Commissioner Henry P. Carr to run for the open seat. Republicans selected Elizabeth Page Hanna, a member of the Republican State Committee.

Carr was elected easily with 61% of the vote. He served in that office until 1968.

Philadelphia city council special election, district 9, 1958
Party	Candidate	Votes	%	±%
Democratic	Henry P. Carr	52,546	61.03	−0.58
Republican	Elizabeth P. Hanna	33,547	38.97	+0.58

== See also ==
- List of members of Philadelphia City Council since 1952
