= Henry P. Carr =

American politician (1904–1993)

Henry P. Carr in 1950

Henry Patrick Carr (January 2, 1904 – October 4, 1993) was a lawyer and Democratic politician from Philadelphia.

Carr was born in Widnes, England, in 1904, the son of Thomas and Minnie Carr. He emigrated to the United States at the age of 17 and later received a law degree from Temple University Law School. Carr married Margarite Schaeffer and they had one son, Edwin, who later played for the San Francisco 49ers. Carr became active in Democratic politics in the city, as well, and served for six years as the chairman of the 42nd ward executive committee. In 1944, Carr managed Herbert J. McGlinchey's campaign for the federal House of Representatives against incumbent Republican Hugh Scott; McGlinchy won, but Scott reclaimed the seat two years later.

In 1950, Carr was appointed United States Commissioner in the United States District Court for the Eastern District of Pennsylvania, a job similar to the modern-day position of United States magistrate judge. He was reappointed in 1955. In 1958, Philadelphia City Councilman Charles M. Finley died in office, and Democratic ward leaders in the district selected Carr to run for the open 9th district seat in a special election later that year. He was elected over his Republican opponent, Elizabeth Page Hanna, with 64% of the vote. In 1959, he was elected to a full term with a slightly higher share of the vote—66%.

Carr testified before a grand jury investigating graft in City Council in 1963 but was not charged. The controversy may have affected his popularity at the polls, as he was re-elected in the 1963 election by a reduced majority of 51%. In the 1967 election, he sought an at-large nomination instead of his district seat, but fell short; in the primary, Carr placed tenth in a field of 33, of whom only the top five could be nominated. Carr returned to his law practice, and retired to a Montgomery County suburb. He died in 1993.

== Sources ==
- "Naturalization Petitions for the Eastern District of Pennsylvania, 1795-1930". Ancestry.com. National Archives and Records Administration. March 27, 1925.
- "H.P. Carr Named U.S. Commissioner". The Philadelphia Inquirer. June 23, 1950. p. 25 – via Newspapers.com.
- "Democrats Pick Carr As Council Candidate". The Philadelphia Inquirer. September 3, 1958. p. 6 – via Newspapers.com.
- "Democrat Carr Takes Council Seat". The Philadelphia Inquirer. November 5, 1958. p. 12 – via Newspapers.com.
- "City Vote Cast For Candidates". The Philadelphia Inquirer. November 5, 1959. p. 4 – via Newspapers.com.
- Trachtman, Joseph H.; McAdams, Leonard J. (June 4, 1963). "2 Councilmen Testify in Probe of $4000 Gift". The Philadelphia Inquirer. p. 1 – via Newspapers.com.
- "Phila. Election at a Glance". The Philadelphia Inquirer. November 7, 1963. p. 5 – via Newspapers.com.
- Heymsfeld, Jeremy; Klimcke, Alfred P. (May 17, 1967). "D'Ortona Leads Field of 33 in Council Battle". The Philadelphia Inquirer. p. 4 – via Newspapers.com.
- "Carr, Henry P., Esq". The Philadelphia Inquirer. October 6, 1993. p. 40 – via Newspapers.com.
