= Samuel Rose (Philadelphia politician) =

American politician

Samuel Rose

Samuel Rose (August 11, 1911 – January 31, 1960) was a Democratic lawyer and politician from Philadelphia.

Rose was born in 1911 in Philadelphia, the son of Issac Louis Rose and Minnie Mutterpearl Rose. Raised in West Philadelphia, he attended Overbrook High School before graduating from the University of Pennsylvania and Temple University Law School. In 1940, he married Rosalie Abrams, with whom he had two children. After law school, he worked as an assistant examiner at the Pennsylvania Public Utility Commission before starting a private law practice with an office in the Market Street Bank Building in Center City. He also worked as a part-time boxing promoter.

Rose quickly got involved in local politics as a Democrat, becoming leader of the 24th ward. He was elected to the Pennsylvania House of Representatives as one of three members from the 18th district, along with fellow Democrats Marshall L. Shepard and John J. Finnerty. (House members at that time were chosen from multimember districts.) In 1942, despite Republican gains statewide, Rose and Finnerty were reelected along with Democrat Dennis W. Hoggard. Two years later, the voters elected all three representatives to another term. In 1946, the Republicans swept the city and much of the state including Rose's district as he and his co-members went down to defeat. Two years later the Democrats regained some of their losses, including electing Rose, Hoggard, and Edward J. Conway from the 18th district, but Republicans still controlled the House. All three were reelected in 1950, despite Republican gains elsewhere in the state.

In 1951, Rose was elected to Philadelphia City Council from West Philadelphia's 4th district, part of a Democratic wave that swept the Republicans from power for the first time in 67 years. He was appointed head of the Law and Government Committee. In 1954, he joined with other reformers to successfully oppose the efforts fellow Democrats James Tate and Michael J. Towey to weaken the civil service reforms of the new charter. The following year, he was reelected with an increased majority of 68%. After his reelection, he was elected majority leader. Rose changed course and joined with Tate in proposing similar amendments to the charter in 1956. The proposals made it on to the April ballot but were defeated by the voters.

Rose suffered a heart attack in April 1959, but recovered enough to win reelection that year. His ailment persisted, however, and he died on January 31, 1960, at the age of 48. Rose was buried at Roosevelt Memorial Park in Trevose, Pennsylvania.

== Sources ==
- "City Democrats Boost Assembly Bloc, 2 to 27". The Philadelphia Inquirer. November 3, 1948. p. 6 – via Newspapers.com.
- "City Vote for State Representative". The Philadelphia Inquirer. November 6, 1940. p. 17 – via Newspapers.com.
- "City Vote for State Representative". The Philadelphia Inquirer. November 4, 1942. p. 25 – via Newspapers.com.
- "Dallas Loses by 457, Party's Lone Casualty". The Philadelphia Inquirer. November 9, 1955. p. 1 – via Newspapers.com.
- "Death certificate". Ancestry.com.
- Feist, William F. (January 11, 1952). "Setup of Committees Revamped By Council". The Philadelphia Inquirer. p. 50 – via Newspapers.com.
- Lush, Gerson H. (November 6, 1946). "GOP Strengthens Grip on Penna. Legislature". The Philadelphia Inquirer. p. 3 – via Newspapers.com.
- Miller, Joseph H. (February 18, 1954). "Council Unit OKs 6-Point Plan to 'Wreck' Charter". The Philadelphia Inquirer. p. 1 – via Newspapers.com.
- "Penna. House Vote by Ward". The Philadelphia Inquirer. November 8, 1944. p. 4 – via Newspapers.com.
- "Samuel Rose". Historical Biographies. Pennsylvania House of Representatives. 2016.
- "Samuel Rose Dies; Councilman Was 48". The Philadelphia Inquirer. February 1, 1960. p. 7 – via Newspapers.com.
- Schraga, Saul (February 24, 1956a). "Council Puts Ripper Up In Primary". The Philadelphia Inquirer. pp. 1, 11 – via Newspapers.com.
- Schraga, Saul (April 25, 1956b). "Voters Beat Proposal To Rip Up Charter". The Philadelphia Inquirer. pp. 1, 4 – via Newspapers.com.
- "3 Republican State Senators Upset in Phila. Vote". The Philadelphia Inquirer. November 8, 1950. p. 2 – via Newspapers.com.
- "Virginia marriage record". Ancestry.com.
- "Woman Elected to First Seat in City Council". The Philadelphia Inquirer. November 7, 1951. p. 2 – via Newspapers.com.
