= Wilbur H. Hamilton =

American businessman and politician

Member of the Philadelphia City Council from the 8th District
- In office 1956–1960
- Preceded by: Constance Dallas
- Succeeded by: Alfred Leopold Luongo

Personal details
- Born: July 19, 1909 Philadelphia, Pennsylvania, U.S.
- Died: July 22, 1964 (aged 55) Philadelphia, Pennsylvania, U.S.
- Party: Republican

Military service
- Allegiance: United States
- Branch/service: United States Army
- Rank: Staff sergeant
- Battles/wars: World War II

Wilbur H. Hamilton (July 19, 1909 – July 22, 1964) was an American businessman and politician from Philadelphia, Pennsylvania.

== Formative years ==
Born in the neighborhood of Manayunk, in Philadelphia, Pennsylvania on July 19, 1909, Hamilton was one of the sons of William J. Hamilton Sr. and a member of a prominent Republican family in the city. He served in the United States Army during World War II. After receiving training at the American Institute of Banking, he worked in the mortgage and bond business.

== Business and political career ==
Hamilton worked for the Boardman–Hamilton & Company Insurance company, eventually becoming its chairman. He also followed his father into politics; from 1951 to 1955, he served in the Pennsylvania House of Representatives. In 1955, he ran for Philadelphia City Council from the 8th district and won, the only Republican to win a district seat that year.

In 1956, after his brother William Jr. died, he became leader of the 21st ward. He rose through the ranks of the Republican Party hierarchy to become Chairman of the City Committee, the effective boss of the organization. He was a delegate to the 1964 Republican National Convention.

== Death ==
On the way home from the 1965 Republican National Convention, Hamilton suffered a heart attack and died suddenly at the age of 55.

== Sources ==
- "Wilbur H. Hamilton, ex-GOP Chairman in City, Dies at 55". Philadelphia Inquirer. July 23, 1964. p. 34 – via Newspapers.com.
- "Wilbur H. Hamilton" (PDF). Historical Biographies. Pennsylvania House of Representatives. 2017.

Preceded by Constance Dallas	Philadelphia City Council; 8th District; 1956–60	Succeeded by Alfred Leopold Luongo
