= Constance Dallas =

American politician

Constance Dallas in 1951 after her election to City Council

Constance Hopkins Snow Dallas (April 28, 1902 – January 13, 1983) was an American politician. A member of the Democratic Party, she served on the Philadelphia City Council as a representative of the city's 8th district. Born in New York and educated in Europe, Dallas came to Philadelphia as a teenager. After marriage and raising children, she entered local politics as a reform-minded Democrat. Following an unsuccessful run for City Council in 1947, she was elected in 1951, the first woman to serve in that legislative body.

Dallas was elected as part of a coalition between the Democratic Party organization and reforming independents who wished to challenge the Republican city government. The reforms in question focused many on shifting power from the city council to the mayor and in converting the longstanding patronage system to convert to a merit system of city employment. Her reformist tendencies clashed with some of the party organization, and she went down to defeat in 1955. After a second career as a newspaper editor and investment banker, she retired in 1978 and died in 1983.

== Early life ==
Dallas was born Constance Hopkins Snow on April 28, 1902, in Brooklyn Heights, New York, the daughter of Henry Sanger Snow and Anna LeConte Brooks. Henry Snow was a lawyer who worked as the treasurer of the New York & New Jersey Telephone Company. Brooks was originally from Philadelphia, the daughter of inventor David Brooks, and had served as president of the Daughters of the American Revolution. Constance was the youngest of the Snow children, born when her mother was forty-seven years old. She had three older siblings: Marion, Edward, and Anna. After Henry Snow was indicted for grand larceny concerning his former employers in 1908, he fled the city, leaving his family destitute. With some financial assistance from Andrew Carnegie, a friend of David Brooks, the family moved to Europe, where accommodations were cheaper and the family could be free of the stigma of Henry's crimes. While there, Constance was educated in convent schools in Belgium. When the family returned to the United States, they settled in Philadelphia and Snow attended Germantown Friends School. She later studied nursing at the University of Pennsylvania, and she served in the Cadet Nurse Corps during World War II.

She married George Mifflin Dallas in 1925. They had three children: Constance Hopkins Dallas, Edith Wharton Dallas, and George Mifflin Dallas Jr. Her husband was descended from a Philadelphia family that included his namesake, George Mifflin Dallas, who was Vice President of the United States from 1845 to 1849, and Alexander J. Dallas, who was Secretary of the Treasury under James Madison. He worked as an executive of the American Briquet Company, and Dallas devoted the early years of her marriage to child-rearing and keeping house, as well as volunteering at Pennsylvania Hospital.

== Political career ==
=== Elections ===
Dallas became involved in politics in the 1940s. "My life in the outside world began after I was 40," she said in a 1979 interview with The Philadelphia Inquirer. In another interview that year, she said that she was not very interested in politics at the time; though she ran for city council in 1947 she only did so when mayoral candidate Richardson Dilworth assured her she would lose. Democratic ward leaders asked her to run for City Council that year because, according to Dallas, "they needed a woman and a Protestant, and they got two for one in me." Dallas was one of two women the Democrats nominated that year. She was nominated in the 6th district which sent four members to City Council under the 1919 city charter. Her first campaign was unsuccessful; in those days, Republicans dominated the city's politics and in 1947 all four of their candidates for councilman in the 6th district were elected. Dallas placed sixth, second among the four Democrats nominated.

In 1951, she ran again for city council, and was successful. The election was the first held under the city's new charter, which had been approved by the voters that April, designed to shift power away from city council to a strong mayor, something reformers believed would produce a system that would be more efficient and less susceptible to corruption. It also included provisions for civil service reform, requiring that city jobs be filled by merit selection rather than patronage. In the November elections, Democrats won control of city government from Republicans for the first time in 67 years. After narrowly winning a primary race against labor lawyer Harry Galfand, Dallas was elected as a part of that wave, winning 54% of the vote in the new 8th district (covering Chestnut Hill, Germantown, and Roxborough) over incumbent Republican councilman Robert S. Hamilton (the new charter did away with multi-member council districts).

=== City Council ===
Dallas was the first woman on City Council, which brought challenges, not least of which was determining how other council members would treat her. She began by insisting that they not call her "Mrs. Dallas." and that they use the title "councilman," not "councilwoman," since that was how it was written in the city charter. "In private life, I'm Mrs. George Dallas," she told a reporter shortly after the election, "but in public life I'm Constance H. Dallas. I object to the use of Mrs."

The electoral majority that brought the Democrats to power in 1951 combined organization Democrats with reform-minded independents. While successful in winning the election, the coalition started to fray soon after taking office. By 1954, however, Democrat James Tate and others in Council attempted to weaken the civil service reforms of the new charter by allowing city employees to be active in party politics. Dallas stood with the reform wing of the party, and the amendment effort fell just short of the two-thirds vote in Council to put the proposed charter amendment on the ballot. In doing so, Dallas worked against the wishes of Democratic City Committee chairman William J. Green Jr., siding instead with the reform-minded mayor, Joseph S. Clark Jr.

Dallas crossed party leadership in other ways, as well. She sided with the city fire department in voting for an ordinance to allow truck traffic on Henry Avenue. The measure was opposed by Jack Kelly Sr., the former Democratic City Committee chairman whose house was on that street. She also took a special interest in the city's decrepit prisons, blaming management appointed by the former Republican administration for the prisons' conditions. Dallas's major success in City Council was the passage of the city's first air pollution ordinance, which she sponsored. She also worked to set up the Tinicum Wildlife Preserve in Southwest Philadelphia (now a part of the John Heinz National Wildlife Refuge at Tinicum.)

Her splits with party leadership contributed to her re-election defeat in 1955. As the Democrats swept to victory in the mayoral race and in the other nine councilmanic districts, Dallas lost to Republican Wilbur H. Hamilton (the brother of her 1951 opponent) by 457 votes, with 520 votes going to a third-party candidate, J. Warren Keel. Speaking later of her electoral defeat, Dallas said "I said I couldn't put my organization above my constituents. Now that makes me sound pious and goody-goody, but I couldn't—so I got defeated." She did not run for elected office again.

== Later life ==
After her defeat, Dallas worked in private business after her husband suffered several strokes and was forced to retire. Initially, she worked as an associate editor at the Philadelphia Daily News. In 1959, she was hired as an investment banker at Dehaven & Townsend, Crouter & Bodine. As in politics, she was one of a few women working in a male-dominated profession. When her husband died, Dallas moved out of their Chestnut Hill home to a retirement community in Delaware County, but continued working until the age of 76. She also remained active on several charitable boards including serving as a commissioner of Valley Forge State Park (now Valley Forge National Historical Park) and in the nonpartisan watchdog group, the Committee of Seventy. She died on January 13, 1983, and was buried alongside her husband in the churchyard of Church of St. James the Less in Philadelphia.

== See also ==
- List of members of Philadelphia City Council since 1952
