= Gaetano Giordano =

American businessman

Gaetano Giordano in 1957

Gaetano Paul "Tommy" Giordano Sr. (December 29, 1918 – August 26, 1996) was a Philadelphia businessman who served three terms on the Philadelphia City Council as a Democrat.

Giordano was born in Philadelphia in 1918, the oldest son of Italian immigrants Paul and Frances Giordano. He was educated at St. Paul's Roman Catholic School in South Philadelphia but left school after the ninth grade to join the family business, a produce and seafood stand in Philadelphia's Italian Market. He enlisted in the Army in February 1941 and served as a parachute instructor at Fort Benning in Georgia during World War II. He was badly injured in a training accident there, breaking both of his legs, and was discharged in 1944.

After returning to the family business, Giordano became known as a community leader and became involved in local Democratic politics. In 1955, when he was the leader of the 2nd ward, party leaders nominated him for the city council from the 2nd district. The South Philadelphia district was, at the time, the only one held by Republicans after the Democrats' near-sweep in 1951. Four years later, Giordano took the seat for his party with 58% of the vote.

Giordano was known as an independent within the party, often having to work against intra-party rivals. He was reelected in 1959, increasing his share of the vote to 66%. He had no primary opponent that year but in 1963, ward leaders in the 2nd district tried to throw their weight behind another Democrat, claiming that Giordano was not responsive to their concerns. The Americans for Democratic Action, a progressive group, also attempted to deny Giordano renomination in a citywide effort to nominate more progressive candidates to the city council. The ward leaders' efforts were unsuccessful and Giordano defeated the ADA-backed candidate, David Savitt, by a five-to-one margin in the May primary election. At the general election in November, Giordano was re-elected, albeit with a reduced share of the vote: 57%.

In his third term, Giordano was accused of collusion with organized crime elements in his district. After police raided three gambling dens in South Philadelphia, the officer in charge of the raids was abruptly transferred across the city. He blamed Giordano, stating in a newspaper interview that the establishments were "protected" by the councilman. Giordano denied the charges. A week later, the officer was arrested and convicted of procurement of prostitution, which he claimed was retaliation by Giordano.

In 1967, the Democratic City Committee backed City Controller Alexander Hemphill for mayor, but Giordano joined many ward leaders in promoting the candidacy of incumbent mayor James Tate instead. Tate defeated Hemphill in the primary that May; Giordano had no primary opposition himself. Tate also defeated his Republican opponent in the general election that fall. Giordano, now running in the 1st district because of redistricting, was not so fortunate, losing narrowly to Republican Benjamin Curcuruto.

Giordano returned to his produce business and survived a bout with throat cancer in the 1970s. His son, Gaetano Jr., ran for city council as a Republican in a 1984 special election, but lost to Democrat Angel L. Ortiz. Giordano continued to put in long hours at the family business until his death in 1996 of a heart attack. After a funeral at St. Paul's Church, he was buried in Saints Peter and Paul Cemetery in Marple Township, Pennsylvania.

== Sources ==
- "1930 United States Federal Census, T626, page 9A". Ancestry.com.
- "Dallas Loses by 457, Party's Lone Casualty". The Philadelphia Inquirer. November 9, 1955. p. 1 – via Newspapers.com.
- "Man of Convictions". The Philadelphia Inquirer. April 25, 1957. p. 3 – via Newspapers.com.
- "City Vote Cast For Candidates". The Philadelphia Inquirer. November 5, 1959. p. 4 – via Newspapers.com.
- Miller, Joseph H. (January 26, 1963a). "Giordano Faces Fight For Nomination; GOP To Meet on Ticket". The Philadelphia Inquirer. p. 5 – via Newspapers.com.
- Miller, Joseph H. (March 18, 1963b). "ADA To Enter 4 in Council Campaign". The Philadelphia Inquirer. p. 6 – via Newspapers.com.
- Hussie, Edward J. (May 22, 1963). "Slate Crushes ADA Hopefuls for Council". The Philadelphia Inquirer. p. 4 – via Newspapers.com.
- "Phila. Election at a Glance". The Philadelphia Inquirer. November 7, 1963. p. 5 – via Newspapers.com.
- "1st Ward Chief Shirts Support To Tate Camp". The Philadelphia Inquirer. May 4, 1967. p. 29 – via Newspapers.com.
- Miller, Joseph H. (November 8, 1967). "Tate Defeats Specter by 10,957; Democrats Keep Council Control". The Philadelphia Inquirer. pp. 1, 5 – via Newspapers.com.
- Sutton, William W. (November 7, 1984). "Ortiz Wins Handily in Council Bid". The Philadelphia Inquirer. p. 14-A – via Newspapers.com.
- Wallace, Andy (August 28, 1996). "Gaetano Giordano, S. Phila. Vendor, ex-city councilman". The Philadelphia Inquirer. p. B4 – via Newspapers.com.
