= 1954 Philadelphia City Council special election =

Philadelphia's City Council special election of 1954 was held to fill the seat vacated by Republican John W. Lord, Jr. when he resigned to join the federal bench.

== Election ==
Under Philadelphia's city charter, adopted three years earlier, seven city council at-large seats were created, of which two were guaranteed to the minority party. After the 1951 elections, those seats were occupied by Republicans Louis Schwartz and John W. Lord, Jr. In May 1954, Lord was appointed a federal district court judge by President Dwight D. Eisenhower. He resigned his council seat, and a special election was called to replace him.

The Republican city committee selected John T. Murphy, a former police detective who had headed the city vice squad, to run for the position. The Democrats selected Donald C. Rubel. Rubel was a lifelong Republican, but joined in the efforts of Democrats and some reform-minded Republicans in working for an end to machine politics in Philadelphia. Although nominated as a Democrat, he remained a Republican, and promised to vote with the Republican party on party-line issues. Rubel was selected by Democratic mayor Joseph S. Clark, Jr. in order to preserve the spirit of the charter's minority representation while promoting a cross-party ally in the reform effort. Clark offered Rubel the spot on the ballot "with no strings attached," something Rubel said he could not refuse.

== Results ==
Rubel was elected with a 120,000-vote majority. He characterized his victory as a call for reform of the city Republican party, saying "[i]f they don't read the handwriting on the wall now, they are hopelessly ignorant." He went on to call for a reorganization of the party to shift control away from what he called a "few little men who call themselves the leaders." Rubel's victory was short-lived. Running as a Republican in the 1955 elections, did well in the independent wards, but placed fourth among that party's nominees, narrowly missing out on one of the two available at-large seats.

Philadelphia City Council special election, 1954
Party	Candidate	Votes	%
Republican	Donald C. Rubel	422,937	56.87
Republican	John T. Murphy	320,690	43.13

== See also ==
- List of members of Philadelphia City Council since 1952

== Sources ==
- Bulletin Almanac 1955. Philadelphia, Pennsylvania: The Philadelphia Bulletin. 1955. OCLC 8641470.
- "Dallas Loses by 457, Party's Lone Casualty". The Philadelphia Inquirer. November 9, 1955.
- "Philadelphia Vice Squad Leader Named". The Evening Sun. Hanover, Pennsylvania. October 23, 1950.
- "Rubel is Victor in Council Race". The Philadelphia Inquirer. November 3, 1954.
- "Something New in Politics in Philadelphia". New Castle News. New Castle, Pennsylvania. October 15, 1954.
- "US District Court Judge Takes Oath of Office". Bristol Daily Courier. Bristol, Pennsylvania. May 29, 1954.
- "Wholesale GOP Shakeup Looms in Philadelphia". Lebanon Daily News. Lebanon, Pennsylvania. November 4, 1954.
