= Maurice S. Osser =

American politician (1910–1995)

Maurice S. Osser in 1971

Maurice S. Osser (January 10, 1910 – September 30, 1995) was a Democratic politician from Philadelphia who served as City Commissioner.

Osser was born in 1910 in Philadelphia, the son of two Jewish immigrants from Russia, Benjamin Osser and Hannah Brody Osser. Osser grew up in the old 16th ward, which housed a diverse collection of immigrant families. He initially worked at his father's livery yard and attended Temple University at night. The neighborhood was heavily Republican, but Osser became involved in the political scene of the Democratic Party, which was outnumbered two-to-one there. In 1931, while still studying for his bachelor's degree, Osser was appointed leader of the 16th ward.

Internal party politics led to Osser's ouster as ward leader in 1933, but he remained a committed party worker. He completed his law degree from Temple University Law School and practiced law. He was reelected ward leader in 1946. In 1948, he ran for Congress in the 3rd district against Republican Hardie Scott and lost badly. He ran again in 1950 in a much closer race. The official tally showed Osser losing to Scott by 925 votes, but he alleged that the race was stolen. He took his challenge to the floor of the House of Representatives, but it was rejected.

The following year, Osser ran for city commissioner and won. In that election, the Democrats overcame the Republicans' 67-year-old hold on city government and became the dominant party in the city. Osser joined fellow Democrat Thomas P. McHenry and Republican Walter I. Davidson on the three-member commission, with McHenry serving as chairman. The office was a county office, a holdover from the time before consolidation of the townships in Philadelphia County into one city. The most important of the remaining duties of a commissioner in Philadelphia was the conduct of the city's elections; they also had responsibility for regulating weights and measures. Because the commissioner's office was a state office, it remained exempt from the city's civil service regulations, making it a powerful source of patronage.

After 1951, the Democrats held most offices in Philadelphia, but politics there were still combative, even on a personal level: after the 1955 election, at which he was reelected, Osser got in a fistfight with a Republican ward leader. He was reelected again in 1959 and mooted for a seat on the local courts in 1961 and 1963, but the disapproval of the bar association stymied his changes. In 1965, the commissioner's office was finally consolidated into the city government and stripped of its non-election-related duties, reducing the political clout of the job. When the ward boundaries were realigned the following year, Osser became ward leader of the 63rd ward in Northeast Philadelphia. He was easily reelected commissioner in 1963 and 1967, becoming chairman of the commission in 1964.

Around that same time, Osser was accused of accepting kickbacks on a deal to replace the city's antiquated voting machines. City Controller Alexander Hemphill got wind of it and City Council held hearings, but the disposition of some of the money was never discovered. Osser drew more controversy in 1971 when the voter rolls were purged of 92,000 names, most of them African Americans. In 1972, he was indicted for mail fraud and taking bribes that were said to total tens of thousands of dollars over the previous fourteen years. He was convicted in United States District Court in December 1972 and resigned his office. Osser served seventeen months of a six-year sentence. He was released from jail in 1975 and retired from politics, but remained active in Jewish causes. He died in 1995 at the age of 85.

== Sources ==
Books

- Bulletin Almanac 1952. Philadelphia, Pennsylvania: The Philadelphia Bulletin. 1952. OCLC 8641470.
- Office of the City Representative (1962). Decade of Progress : The story of Philadelphia, 1952–1961. Division of Public Information, Office of the City Representative. OCLC 11471789.

Newspapers

- "Osser Asks Seat of Hardie Scott". The Philadelphia Inquirer. December 19, 1950. p. 22 – via Newspapers.com.
- "B. Osser, Father of City Official". The Philadelphia Inquirer. April 3, 1966. p. 30 – via Newspapers.com.
- Leary, Mike (December 3, 1972). "The Rise, Abrupt Fall of Maurice S. Osser". The Philadelphia Inquirer. pp. B1, B4 – via Newspapers.com.
- Strahahn, Susan Q. (December 21, 1972). "Osser Given 6 Years, Resigns City Post". The Philadelphia Inquirer. p. A1 – via Newspapers.com.
- Sataline, Suzanne (October 2, 1995). "Maurice S. Osser, 85; Was City Power Broker". The Philadelphia Inquirer. p. C12 – via Newspapers.com.
