= Thomas P. McHenry =

American politician

Thomas P. McHenry

Thomas Patrick McHenry (February 28, 1898 – May 22, 1971) was a Democratic politician from Philadelphia who served as city commissioner.

McHenry was born in Philadelphia in 1898 to John McHenry and Rosa (Cosgriff) McHenry. McHenry's father was born in Scotland, but all four of his grandparents were originally from Ireland. He grew up in the Kensington neighborhood, attended Northeast High School, and later served in the United States Coast Guard. He married Mary McBride in 1919, and they had three children.

McHenry entered the insurance business and also became involved in local Democratic politics. He was elected leader of the 51st ward and served as secretary to City Commissioner John J. Hennessey. When Hennessey died in office in 1945, McHenry was selected to fill his post. He was re-elected in 1947, remaining the lone Democrat on the three-member commission.

In 1951, Democrats captured city government, including the majority on the city commission. McHenry led the voting, followed by fellow Democrat Maurice S. Osser. Republican Walter I. Davidson rounded out the three-member commission. The office was a county office, a holdover from the time before consolidation of the townships in Philadelphia County into one city. The most important of the remaining duties of a commissioner in Philadelphia was the conduct of the city's elections; they also had responsibility for regulating weights and measures.

McHenry was reelected in 1955, 1959, 1963, and 1967. McHenry was elected chairman of the commission in 1951, a position he held until 1964, when he yielded it to Osser. In 1967, he split from the Democratic party hierarchy by backing James Tate for mayor over Alexander Hemphill. The party organization declined to endorse him as a result, but McHenry easily won his primary (as did Tate) and was reelected in November. He remained in office until 1971, when he died of a heart attack at the age of 73.

== Sources ==
Books

- Bulletin Almanac 1952. Philadelphia, Pennsylvania: The Philadelphia Bulletin. 1952. OCLC 8641470.
- Office of the City Representative (1962). Decade of Progress : The story of Philadelphia, 1952–1961. Division of Public Information, Office of the City Representative. OCLC 11471789.

Newspapers

- Miller, Joseph H. (September 19, 1945). "McHenry Elected By Judges to Hennessey's County Post". The Philadelphia Inquirer – via Newspapers.com.
- "McHenry Is Cut From Slate". The Philadelphia Inquirer. May 3, 1967. p. 10 – via Newspapers.com.
- "T.P. McHenry Dies, Democratic Leader". The Philadelphia Inquirer. May 23, 1971. p. 28 – via Newspapers.com.

Website

- "1900 United States Federal Census". Ancestry.com. National Archives and Records Administration. 1900.
