= Donald C. Rubel =

American politician

- Born: Donald Clarke Rubel; October 1, 1900; Cincinnati, Ohio, United States
- Died: February 12, 1980 (aged 79)
- Education: Brown University
- Occupations: banker and politician
- Political party: Republican
- Parents: Henry M. Rubel (father); Gretchen Scott Rubel (mother)

Donald Clarke Rubel (October 1, 1900 – February 12, 1980) was a Philadelphia banker and politician.

== Early life and career ==
Rubel was born in Cincinnati, Ohio, in 1900, the son of Henry M. Rubel and Gretchen Scott Rubel. He served in the United States Marine Corps during World War I and graduated from Brown University in 1923. After graduation, Rubel stayed at Brown to coach the freshmen football team. He later became a stockbroker and was a member of the Union League. In 1925, he married Julia Davis Lee at St. Paul's Episcopal Church in Chestnut Hill, Philadelphia. They had a son, Walter, and a daughter, Julia. He joined Parrish Securities in 1930, and remained associated with the firm for the rest of his life.

== Politics ==
Rubel was a lifelong Republican, but joined in the efforts of Democrats and some reform-minded Republicans in working for an end to machine politics in Philadelphia. He served as president of the Committee of Seventy, a local reform organization. Rubel advocated the passage of a new city charter in 1951, as well as the defeat of the GOP political machine at the polls that same year.

Under the new charter, seven city council at-large seats were created, of which two were guaranteed to the minority party. After the 1951 elections, those seats were occupied by Republicans, and when one of them, John W. Lord Jr., resigned his seat in May 1954 to become a federal district court judge, a special election was called to replace him. The Republicans selected John T. Murphy, a police detective, to run for the position, while the Democrats selected Rubel. Although nominated as a Democrat, he remained a Republican, and promised to vote with the Republican party on party-line issues. Rubel was selected by Democratic mayor Joseph S. Clark Jr. in order to preserve the spirit of the charter's minority representation while promoting a cross-party ally in the reform effort.

Rubel was elected with a 120,000-vote majority. He characterized his victory as a call for reform of the city Republican party, saying "[i]f they don't read the handwriting on the wall now, they are hopelessly ignorant." Rubel's victory was short-lived. Running as a Republican in the 1955 elections, he did well in the independent wards, but placed fourth among that party's nominees, narrowly missing out on one of the two available at-large seats.

After the election, he continued his work with the Committee of Seventy, calling for reform in the way election officials were selected. He was also appointed to the board of directors of City Trusts, managing trusts of which the city was the trustee, including Girard College. In 1962, he filed suit on behalf of the committee in an attempt to force a reapportionment of state senate seats, which had not been adjusted for population changes in six decades. Republican party leaders considered nominating him for mayor in 1963, but instead chose James T. McDermott, who lost to incumbent Democrat James Tate that fall. In 1964, he became chairman of the city Republican party policy committee and was appointed by Governor William Scranton to the City Registration commission, giving the Republicans a majority (the commission was abolished the following year). Scranton's successor, Raymond P. Shafer, appointed Rubel to the SEPTA board of directors in 1968. After retiring from politics, Rubel died in 1980.

== Sources ==
- Bulletin Almanac 1956. Philadelphia, Pennsylvania: The Philadelphia Bulletin. 1956. OCLC 8641470.
- "3 Cabinet Members Named on Phila. Mayor's Post List". The Evening Sun. Hanover, Pennsylvania. February 11, 1963.
- "Dispute Brews Over Appointment". Indiana Gazette. Indiana, Pennsylvania. December 30, 1964.
- "Donald C. Rubel, Once On Council". The Philadelphia Inquirer. February 14, 1980 – via Newspapers.com.
- "GOP State Platform Urges Elimination of State Real Estate Transfer Tax". Daily Republican. Monongahela, Pennsylvania. August 15, 1958.
- "Oden and Rubel will Coach the Brown Cubs". Brooklyn Eagle. September 9, 1923.
- "Rubel is Victor in Council Race". The Philadelphia Inquirer. November 3, 1954.
- "Suit Filed to Force Pa. Legislative Redistricting". Standard-Speaker. Hazleton, Pennsylvania. March 31, 1962.
- "Wholesale GOP Shakeup Looms in Philadelphia". Lebanon Daily News. Lebanon, Pennsylvania. November 4, 1954.
- "Donald Rubel Oral History". Walter Massey Phillips Oral Histories. Temple University Special Collections Oral Histories Repository. June 25, 1979.
