= Marshall L. Shepard =

American Christian clergyman and politician (1899–1967)

Marshall L. Shepard

Marshall Lorenzo Shepard, Sr. (July 10, 1899 – February 21, 1967) was an American Christian clergyman and politician. Affiliated with the Democratic Party, his political career was focused in the city of Philadelphia.

Born to an African American family in North Carolina, he came to Philadelphia to serve as pastor of Mount Olivet Tabernacle Baptist Church, a black Baptist congregation. He worked as a pastor there for forty years. He gained a national reputation as a preacher, rising to prominence within the denomination. Shepard also became involved in Democratic politics in Philadelphia. He was elected to three terms in the Pennsylvania General Assembly and three terms on the Philadelphia City Council, where he served until his death in 1967.

== Early life and education ==
Shepard was born July 10, 1899, in Oxford, North Carolina, the son of Robert Shepard and Pattie Gilliam Shepard. Robert Shepard was born a slave and later became a Baptist minister and the superintendent of the Colored Orphanage Asylum of North Carolina. Pattie Shepard was also involved in charitable work and served as the head of the Women's Baptist Home Convention of North Carolina. Marshall Shepard followed his parents in joining the First Baptist Church of Oxford. He attended Slater State Normal School in Winston-Salem, North Carolina, then received his Doctor of Divinity in 1921 from Virginia Union University, a historically black university in Richmond, Virginia.

After graduation, Shepard moved to New York City, where he received additional education at the City College of New York and the Union Theological Seminary. From 1922 to 1923, he served as secretary for religious work at the 135th Street branch of the YMCA in Harlem. In 1923, he married Willia Lucille Owens, with whom he had two sons. That same year, he was hired as assistant pastor at the Abyssinian Baptist Church in Harlem, of which Adam Clayton Powell Sr. was the pastor.

== Philadelphia pastor ==
In 1926, Shepard accepted the position of pastor at Mount Olivet Tabernacle Baptist Church in West Philadelphia, where he would remain for the rest of his life. The church struggled financially, especially after the onset of the Great Depression in 1929, and several congregation members mortgaged their homes to keep the church afloat. Shepard's reputation as a minister grew, and he served as assistant secretary of the National Baptist Convention and associate editor of the National Baptist Voice.

Shepard chaired the National Baptist Convention's Board of Foreign Missions for many years, and in 1947 he was a delegate to the World Baptist Alliance meeting in Copenhagen. Despite his growing renown, he remained dedicated to his Mount Olivet church. His Sunday morning sermons were especially celebrated, and his preaching style drew praise from many contemporaries, including Gardner C. Taylor, who called him "the best extemporaneous preacher the Black race has produced." In 1960, he endorsed Senator John F. Kennedy for president and decried those Protestants who would oppose him based on their opposition to his Roman Catholic faith.

== Political career ==
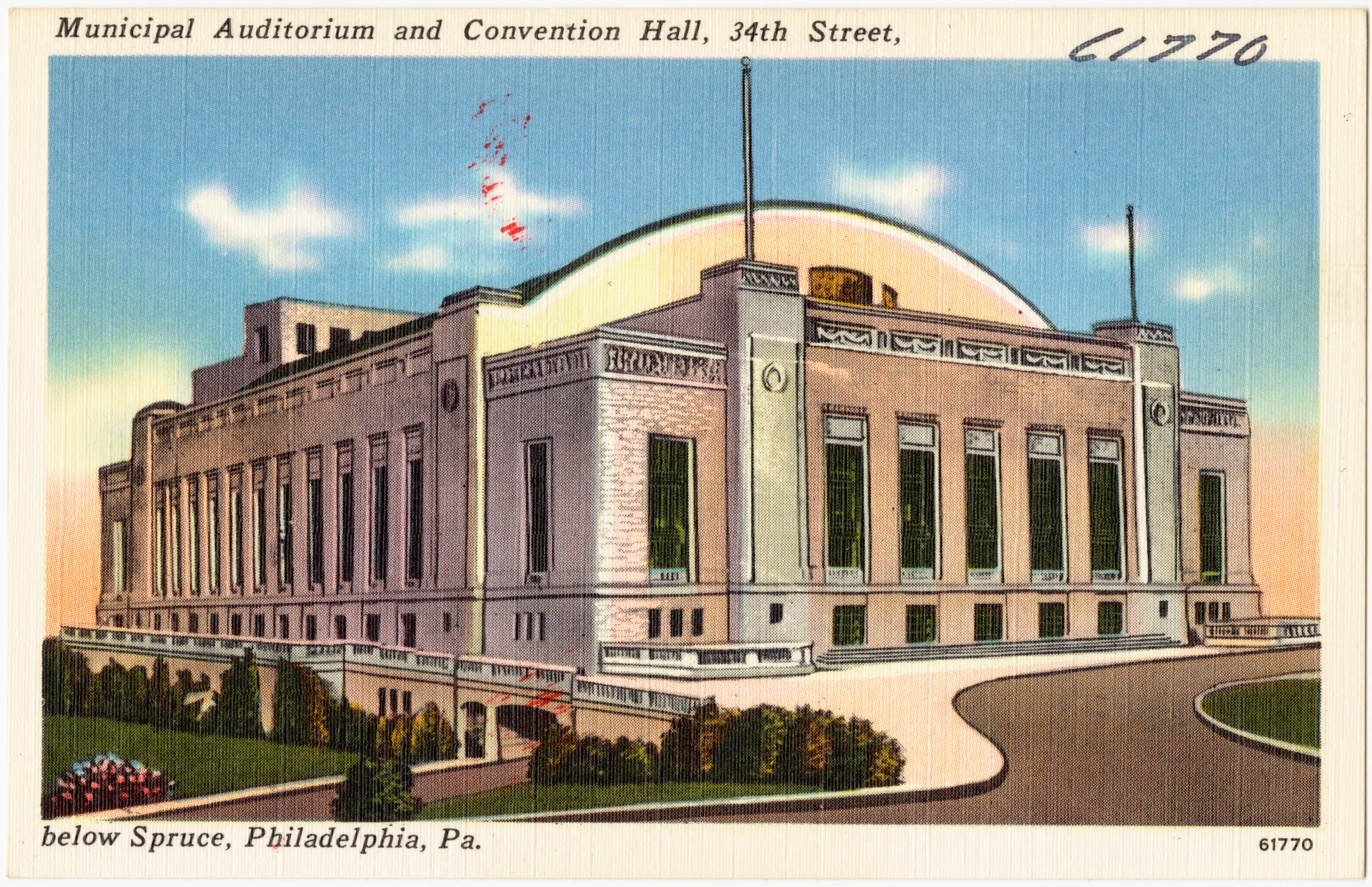
Shepard spoke at the 1936 Democratic National Convention at Convention Hall in Philadelphia.

Shepard's congregation encouraged him to become involved in secular politics, and he held several offices over his lifetime. Running as a member of the Democratic Party, he was elected to the Pennsylvania House of Representatives in 1934 as one of three members from the 18th district, along with fellow Democrats Joseph Ominsky and John J. Finnerty. (House members at that time were chosen from multimember districts.) While in the legislature, he co-sponsored a bill that would have banned racial discrimination in state contracting. Shepard was chosen to offer a prayer at the 1936 Democratic National Convention, which was held in Philadelphia that year. The sight of a black minister on the podium led Ellison D. Smith, a segregationist Senator representing South Carolina, to storm out of the convention. Shepard's response to the incident was to say "it was just a sign the good brother needs more prayer."

In 1936, Shepard, Ominsky, and Finnerty were all reelected to the legislature. The following year, he was appointed to a commission charged with drafting a new city charter for Philadelphia, but the resulting document was rejected by the voters at the polls that November. He was not a candidate for reelection in 1938, but in 1940 he ran again and was elected along with Finnerty and Samuel Rose. After that term ended, President Franklin D. Roosevelt appointed Shepard recorder of deeds in Washington, D.C., a position he held until 1951. At that time, Shepard and Mary McLeod Bethune were the only two black people in government service in the nation's capital.

Shepard resigned from his federal post to run in the 1951 election in Philadelphia. The Democrats nominated him for the recorder of deeds post which, unlike the Washington position, was elected by the voters. He was victorious in the election, winning as a part of a Democratic wave that swept the Republican Party from power for the first time in 67 years. The job, a former county-level position, was eliminated and the department consolidated into city government in 1953. Shepard was named to the equivalent civil service position, Commissioner of Records, after the consolidation.

In 1955, Shepard ran for an at-large seat on the Philadelphia City Council. By the rules of the limited voting system for the at-large seats, each political party could nominate five candidates and voters could only vote for five, with the result being that the majority party could only take five of the seven seats, leaving two for the minority party. Shepard won one of the five Democratic slots and was easily elected. On the council, he served as head of the public works committee. In 1956, charter amendments aimed at weakening civil service protections were proposed. Shepard initially opposed the change, but later voted in favor after party leaders promised him more black Democrats would get political appointments. The amendments found the required two-thirds vote in Council to make it on to the ballot for popular approval but failed in a vote that April.

Shepard was reelected in 1959 and again in 1963. In February 1967, he underwent surgery to remove a brain tumor. Three weeks later, he died at the University of Pennsylvania Hospital at the age of 67. After a funeral at his church, he was buried in Oxford, North Carolina. His son, Marshall Jr., went on to lead the Mount Olivet Church until his death in 2002. In 2008, the Philadelphia Housing Authority opened a new housing development near the church, which they named after Shepard.

== Sources ==
Books

- Murphy, Larry G.; Melton, J. Gordon; Ward, Gary L., eds. (1993). "Shepard, Marshall Lorenzo, Sr". Encyclopedia of African American Religions. New York: Routledge. ISBN 978-0-8153-0500-2.
- Vann, Andre D. (2000). Vance County, North Carolina. Charleston, South Carolina: Arcadia Publishing. ISBN 978-0-7385-0663-0.
- Whitted, J.A. (1908). A History of the Negro Baptists of North Carolina. Raleigh, North Carolina: Edwards & Broughton. ISBN 978-1-4820-9660-6.

Journals

- Paige, Myles A. (April 1925). "Brother Reverend Marshall L. Shepard". The Sphinx. 11 (2): 14.
- Phinne, Lucille (July 11, 1968). "Yesterday in Afro-American History". Jet. 34 (14): 14.
- Smith, Eric Ledell; Wolensky, Kenneth C. (Autumn 2002). "A Novel Public Policy: Pennsylvania's Fair Employment Practices Act of 1955". Pennsylvania History. 69 (4): 489–523. JSTOR 27774444.

Newspapers

- "Vote in Phila. for Legislature". The Philadelphia Inquirer. November 7, 1934. p. 12 – via Newspapers.com.
- "City Vote for Legislature". The Philadelphia Inquirer. November 4, 1936. p. 18 – via Newspapers.com.
- "City Vote for State Representative". The Philadelphia Inquirer. November 6, 1940. p. 17 – via Newspapers.com.
- Baker, Joseph V. (June 13, 1951). "Negroes Active in Phila. Politics". The Philadelphia Inquirer. p. 15 – via Newspapers.com.
- Miller, Joseph H. (November 7, 1951). "Democrats Win By 122,000". The Philadelphia Inquirer. p. 1 – via Newspapers.com.
- "Dallas Loses by 457, Party's Lone Casualty". The Philadelphia Inquirer. November 9, 1955. p. 1 – via Newspapers.com.
- Miller, Joseph H. (February 20, 1956). "Shepard's Key Vote For Charter Ripper Tied To Deal For Jobs". The Philadelphia Inquirer. p. 1 – via Newspapers.com.
- Schraga, Saul (April 25, 1956). "Voters Beat Proposal To Rip Up Charter". The Philadelphia Inquirer. pp. 1, 4 – via Newspapers.com.
- "Negro Group Gives Blessing to Kennedy". The Index-Journal. Greenwood, South Carolina. October 6, 1960. p. 7 – via Newspapers.com.
- "Rev. M.L. Shepard, Councilman, is Dead". The Philadelphia Inquirer. February 22, 1967. p. 36 – via Newspapers.com.

Websites

- "Who We Are". Mount Olivet Tabernacle Baptist Church. 2017.
- "PHA opens Marshall Shepard Village in West Philadelphia". PHA News. Philadelphia Housing Authority. May 1, 2008.
- "Marshall L. Shepard" (PDF). Historical Biographies. Pennsylvania House of Representatives. 2017.
