= Thomas McIntosh (politician) =

African American politician (1921–2005)

- Thomas McIntosh in 1967

Member of the Philadelphia City Council from the 5th district
- In office January 5, 1959 – January 3, 1972
- Preceded by: Raymond Pace Alexander
- Succeeded by: Ethel D. Allen

Personal details
- Born: Thomas McIntosh; May 11, 1921 Philadelphia, Pennsylvania, U.S.
- Died: October 4, 2005 (aged 84) Philadelphia, Pennsylvania, U.S.
- Resting place: Ivy Hill Cemetery, Philadelphia, Pennsylvania, U.S.
- Party: Democratic
- Spouse: Marjorie Osborne (m. 1950)
- Children: 6
- Occupation: Politician

Thomas McIntosh (May 11, 1921 – October 4, 2005) was a Democratic politician from Philadelphia who served as a member of the Philadelphia City Council for three terms, from his initial election in 1959 until his defeat in 1972. Born and raised in North Philadelphia, he attended Temple University and Lincoln University before being drafted to the military during World War II. He became involved in politics, and became a committeeman in the 29th ward. When Raymond Pace Alexander retired from the 5th municipal district, McIntosh was selected to replace him.

As a member of the city council, McIntosh opposed minority set-asides in city hiring and questioned the police's use of excessive force against minorities. In 1968, he became chairman of the council's Appropriations Committee. By 1970, he was considered a member of the "triumvirate" that controlled City Council. He lost re-election in 1971, and later worked as the director of the Office of Consumer Affairs and the head of the Philadelphia Housing Authority. McIntosh died on October 4, 2005. He was buried at Ivy Hill Cemetery.

== Early life ==
Thomas McIntosh was born on May 11, 1921, to Robert and Creola Johnson McIntosh. He was raised in North Philadelphia, and attended Central High School, graduating in 1940. He then attended Temple University and Lincoln University for three years, before being drafted into the United States Army Air Forces in 1943. After the end of the Second World War, he finished a bachelor's degree in 1948 from Martin College. In 1950, he married Marjorie Osborne, with whom he would have six children. After studying law at Temple for two years, McIntosh took a job with the state department of revenue.

== Political career ==
=== Early political career ===
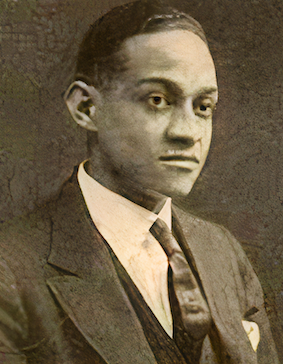
Raymond Pace Alexander, McIntosh's predecessor

McIntosh had previously been involved in Democratic Party politics since high school, and he became a committeeman in the 29th ward. When then-councilman Raymond Pace Alexander of the 5th district retired from office, ward leaders in the district selected McIntosh as their candidate to succeed Alexander in the upcoming municipal election in 1959. McIntosh was elected to the safely Democratic 5th district, while Democrats swept all ten districts that year. McIntosh's victory the highest percentage of the vote of any council candidate, with 77%. In his first term on the city council, McIntosh worked on the problem of excessive force by the city's police officers, also questioning whether there was a "deep-seated animosity" by police toward the city's black population.

At the same time, he pushed back against civil rights leader Cecil B. Moore's call for minority set-asides in city hiring, saying "I don't go along with the idea for designating any particular job for a race." In 1963, McIntosh was elected leader of the 29th ward. That spring, he was easily re-nominated for council over progressive challenger Elease M. Sullivan. In that fall's election, he defeated Republican Andrew Wilson with 75% of the vote. In his second term, McIntosh challenged the School District of Philadelphia to make sure that school conditions were equal in both black and white neighborhoods and to redraw district boundaries to encourage racial integration. He also led an investigation in City Council when a black police captain died after being refused admission to Philadelphia General Hospital in 1966.

=== Later political career ===
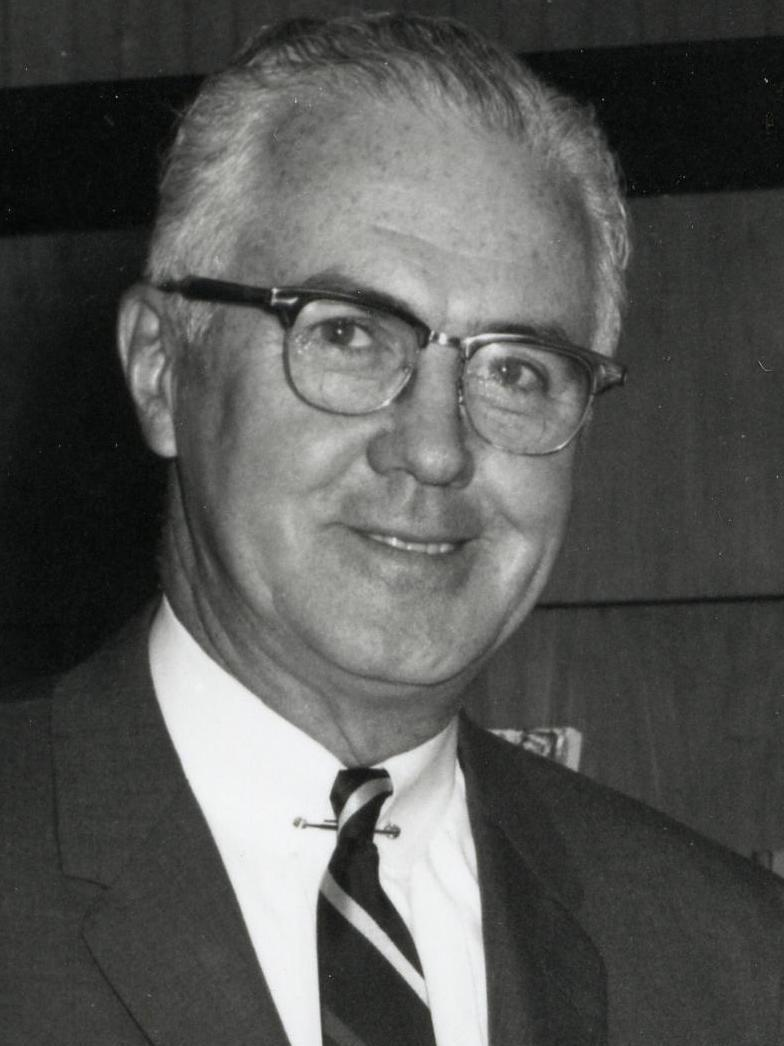
Mayor James Tate, whose re-election McIntosh supported

In 1967, McIntosh broke with the party hierarchy by supporting Mayor James Tate's re-election bid, instead of the party organization's preferred candidate of Alexander Hemphill. His support of Tate cost him the organization's endorsement in the Democratic primary that year, but he was re-nominated anyway. In the general election, he was easily re-elected, defeating Republican Wilbur C. Bowers with 59% of the vote. In 1968, McIntosh became chairman of the council's Appropriations Committee. By 1970, he was considered, along with George X. Schwartz and Paul D'Ortona, to be one of the "triumvirate" that controlled City Council.

He was easily re-nominated for a fourth term in 1971, but faced an unexpectedly tight race as the mayoral candidacy of Frank Rizzo scrambled voters' loyalties. He lost the general election to Republican Ethel D. Allen, and was the only Democrat on the council to lose that year. After his defeat, McIntosh worked for the Rizzo administration as the director of the Office of Consumer Affairs. He continued in that office under Mayor William J. Green III, then became head of the Philadelphia Housing Authority in 1978. He later worked as a legislative liaison at the Philadelphia Parking Authority and remained active in government as a consultant well into his eighties. McIntosh died on October 4, 2005, at the age of 84 after a brief illness. After a funeral at Holy Trinity Bethlehem Presbyterian Church, he was buried at Ivy Hill Cemetery in Philadelphia.

== Electoral history ==
=== 1959 ===
1959 Philadelphia city council election, district 5
| Party | Candidate | Votes | % | ±% |
|---|---|---|---|---|
| Democratic | Thomas McIntosh | 35,666 | 77.76 | +7.49 |
| Republican | Elsie James | 10,013 | 21.81 | −7.92 |
| Civic | Henry C. James | 188 | 0.42 | +0.42 |

=== 1963 ===
1963 Philadelphia city council election, district 5
| Party | Candidate | Votes | % | ±% |
|---|---|---|---|---|
| Democratic | Thomas McIntosh (incumbent) | 34,742 | 75.27 | −2.49 |
| Republican | Andrew Wilson | 11,416 | 24.73 | +2.92 |

Political offices
Philadelphia City Council
| Preceded by Raymond Pace Alexander | Member of the Philadelphia City Council for the 5th district 1959–1972 | Succeeded by Ethel D. Allen |
