= Alfred Leopold Luongo =

American judge (1920–1986)

Chief Judge of the United States District Court for the Eastern District of Pennsylvania
- In office 1982–1986
- Preceded by: Joseph Simon Lord III
- Succeeded by: John P. Fullam

Judge of the United States District Court for the Eastern District of Pennsylvania
- In office September 22, 1961 – July 19, 1986
- Appointed by: John F. Kennedy
- Preceded by: Seat established by 75 Stat. 80
- Succeeded by: Franklin Van Antwerpen

Personal details
- Born: Alfred Leopold Luongo; August 17, 1920 Philadelphia, Pennsylvania
- Died: July 19, 1986 (aged 65)
- Education: University of Pennsylvania (B.S.); University of Pennsylvania Law School (LL.B.)

Alfred Leopold Luongo (August 17, 1920 – July 19, 1986) was a United States district judge of the United States District Court for the Eastern District of Pennsylvania.

== Education and career ==
Born in Philadelphia, Pennsylvania, Luongo attended Germantown High School and received a Bachelor of Science degree from the University of Pennsylvania in 1941. He served as a Technical Sergeant in the United States Army during World War II, from 1942 to 1946. After the war, he received a Bachelor of Laws from the University of Pennsylvania Law School in 1947, and was a law clerk for the Court of Common Pleas in Philadelphia from 1948 to 1949. He clerked again for Judge Thomas James Clary of the United States District Court for the Eastern District of Pennsylvania from 1949 to 1952. Luongo became an Assistant United States Attorney of the Eastern District of Pennsylvania from 1952 to 1953, then entered private practice at the firm of Blank Rome Comisky & McCauley in Philadelphia until 1961. He was elected to the Philadelphia City Council in 1959 and served there from 1960 to 1961.

== Federal judicial service ==
On September 14, 1961, Luongo was nominated by President John F. Kennedy to a new seat on the United States District Court for the Eastern District of Pennsylvania created by 75 Stat. 80. He was confirmed by the United States Senate on September 21, 1961, and received his commission on September 22, 1961. He served as Chief Judge from 1982 until his death on July 19, 1986.

=== Notable case ===
One of Luongo's more noteworthy cases was in 1979, when he ruled during the gas crisis that gas station owners could not show favoritism toward regular customers.

== Sources ==
- Colimore, Edward (July 20, 1986). "Alfred L. Luongo, 65, District Court judge". Philadelphia Inquirer. p. 18-E – via Newspapers.com.

Legal offices
Preceded by Seat established by 75 Stat. 80	Judge of the United States District Court for the Eastern District of Pennsylvania; 1961–1986	Succeeded by Franklin Van Antwerpen
Preceded by Joseph Simon Lord III	Chief Judge of the United States District Court for the Eastern District of Pennsylvania; 1982–1986	Succeeded by John P. Fullam
