= Virginia Knauer =

American politician (1915–2011)

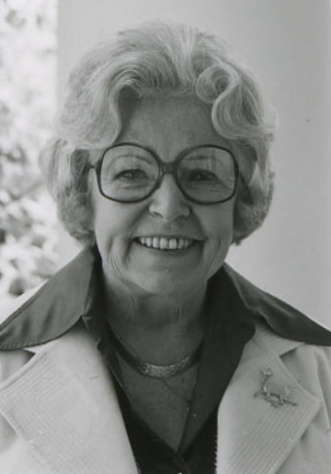
- Knauer in 1981

1st & 3rd Director of the Bureau of Consumer Protection
- In office January 20, 1981 – January 20, 1989
- President: Ronald Reagan
- Preceded by: Esther Peterson
- Succeeded by: Ann Windham Wallace
- In office February 24, 1971^{[a]} – January 20, 1977
- President: Richard Nixon; Gerald Ford
- Preceded by: Office established
- Succeeded by: Esther Peterson

3rd Special Assistant to the President for Consumer Affairs
- In office April 19, 1969 – February 24, 1971
- President: Richard Nixon
- Preceded by: Betty Furness
- Succeeded by: Position abolished

1st Director of the Pennsylvania Bureau of Consumer Protection
- In office January 1, 1968 – April 19, 1969
- Governor: Ray Shafer
- Preceded by: Position created
- Succeeded by: Bette Clemens^{[b]}

Member of the Philadelphia City Council from the at-large district
- In office January 4, 1960 – January 1, 1968
- Preceded by: Louis Schwartz
- Succeeded by: W. Thacher Longstreth

Personal details
- Born: Virginia Harrington Wright; March 28, 1915 Philadelphia, Pennsylvania, U.S.
- Died: October 16, 2011 (aged 96) Washington, D.C., U.S.
- Spouse: Wilhelm Knauer
- Children: 2
- Education: University of Pennsylvania
- a.Though the Office of Consumer Affairs was originally created by an Executive Order in February of 1971, it was not backed by statutory law until Congressional approval was given in October of that year. b.Richard W. Richards served as Acting Director from the date of Knauer's departure until August of 1969.

Virginia Harrington Knauer (née Wright; March 28, 1915 – October 16, 2011) was an American Republican politician. She served as the Special Assistant to the President for Consumer Affairs and Director of the U.S. Office of Consumer Affairs (1969–1977 and 1981–1989). In 1959 she became the first Republican woman to be elected to the Philadelphia City Council, in which she served for eight years. She was appointed to the newly created post of chief consumer advisor to Pennsylvania Governor Ray Shafer. She was also the mentor and good friend of former North Carolina Senator Elizabeth Dole. Knauer died on October 16, 2011, in Washington, D.C., at age 96.

== Early life and education ==
Knauer was born Virginia Harrington Wright on March 28, 1915, in Philadelphia, Pennsylvania. She grew up in Philadelphia, where her father was a professor of accounting at Temple University. She was educated at the Philadelphia High School for Girls, Pennsylvania Academy of Fine Arts and the University of Pennsylvania (graduated 1937); she also attended the Royal Academy of Fine Arts in Florence, Italy.

During the 1950s, Knauer was one of the country's top breeders of Doberman Pinschers. She served as president of the Doberman Pinscher Club of America.

== Political career ==
A Republican party operative, Knauer was elected to the Philadelphia City Council in the 1959 municipal election. Later, she was the head of the Pennsylvania Bureau of Consumer Protection. She became Richard Nixon's special assistant for consumer affairs in 1969. At the time, she was the highest-ranking woman in the administration. She also became the director of the U.S. Office of Consumer Affairs, where she became an energetic supporter of consumers' rights. In 1970, she told The Washington Post, "I've been a feminist for 20 years, and I'm all for advancing women in public office." Her top assistant was a lawyer named Elizabeth Hanford, whom she introduced to her future husband, Bob Dole.

In office, Knauer promoted recycling and nutritional labeling, unit pricing of groceries, and other consumer-friendly features. She predicted that, because of domestic automakers' reluctance to install safety and environmental improvements, among other advances, foreign manufacturers would increase their share of the U.S. auto market. During the 1973–1975 recession, she recommended that households eat more "liver, kidney, brains, and heart" after stagflation caused meat prices to double. She also headed the Office of Consumer Affairs during the Gerald Ford and Ronald Reagan administrations.

== Family ==
Knauer married Wilhelm F. Knauer, a lawyer, in 1940. Wilhelm Knauer served as Pennsylvania Deputy Attorney General. He died in 1976. The Knauers had one son, Judge Wilhelm F. Knauer Jr. (died 1986), one daughter, Valerie Knauer Burden, and three granddaughters, Virginia Burden, Frances Burden, and Nancy J. Knauer. Virginia Knauer died October 16, 2011, of congestive heart failure, in Washington, D.C.
