= Hobson R. Reynolds =

American politician (1898–1991)

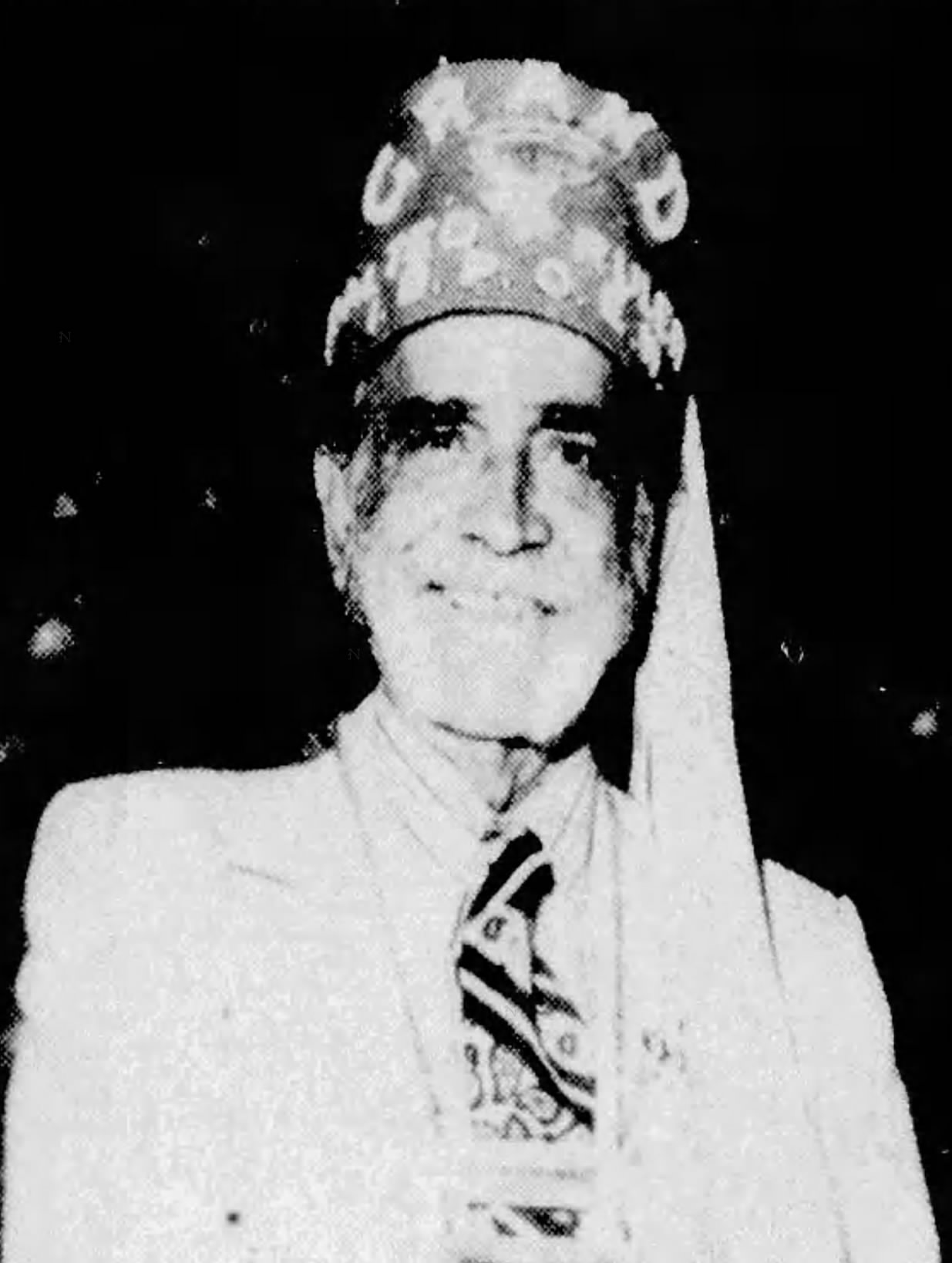
- Reynolds in 1977
- Born: September 13, 1898; Winton, North Carolina
- Died: February 4, 1991 (aged 92); Ahoskie, North Carolina
- Known for: Representative in the Pennsylvania House of Representatives and Grand Exalted Ruler of the Improved Benevolent Protective Order of the Elks of the World

Hobson R. Reynolds (September 13, 1898 – February 4, 1991) was an African-American funeral director, a state legislator, public official, judge, and civil rights leader who lived in Pennsylvania.

== Early life ==
Reynolds was born in Winton, North Carolina, on September 13, 1898. He attended North Carolina State Teachers Training School and Eckels College of Mortuary Science. He married Evelyn C. Crawford in 1926 in Philadelphia.

== Career ==
Reynolds was a well-known funeral home director in Philadelphia. He was heavily involved in politics and served as a Representative on the Pennsylvania House of Representatives as a Republican for the 1935 term, drafting the first civil rights legislation for the state titled the Reynolds Civil Rights Bill, and as a Democrat for the 1939 term. He was also elected as a Magistrate for the Philadelphia City Court from 1944 to 1950. In 1959, he was appointed to the Fair Housing Administration by President Dwight D. Eisenhower. Reynolds was chosen to give the seconding speech for Eisenhower at the Republican National Convention in 1952. President Franklin D. Roosevelt chose Renyolds as an observer to the formation of the United Nations and Reynolds was appointed as Assistant Secretary to the United States Department of Housing and Urban Development.

== Improved Benevolent and Protective Order of Elks of the World ==
Reynolds was a prominent member of the Improved Benevolent and Protective Order of Elks of the World, a Black fraternal organization. He joined in the early 1930s and became the Grand Director of the Civil Liberties Department in 1939. He held this post for twenty-five years where he fought in the Civil rights movement alongside other prominent Civil Rights leaders such as Martin Luther King Jr. He investigated lynchings and racial discrimination, lobbied for justice and equality in government, law enforcement, and education, and urged African-Americans to register to vote. He created the Elijah Parish Lovejoy Award within the Elks, not to be confused with the Elijah Parish Lovejoy Award, which was given to prominent leaders such as Martin Luther King Jr., Ralph Bunche, A. Philip Randolph, Roy Wilkins, Adam Clayton Powell Jr., Whitney Young, Mary McLeod Bethune, Branch Rickey, Thurgood Marshall, Marian Anderson, Edward Brooke, Dorothy Height, Jesse Jackson, Coretta Scott King, and Vernon Jordan.

In 1960, he became the Grand Exalted Ruler which he held until 1982. In the 1960s, he donated his 77-acre farm in Winton, North Carolina for the new national headquarters of the Elks National Shrine.

== Later life ==
Reynolds died on February 4, 1991 in Ahoskie, North Carolina. He is buried with his wife at the Hobson R. Reynolds National Elks Shrine in Winton, North Carolina.

== See also ==
- List of African-American officeholders (1900–1959)
