= Walter I. Davidson =

American politician

Walter I. Davidson in 1959

Walter Isaac Davidson (July 28, 1895 – February 28, 1985) was a Philadelphia businessman, civic leader, and Republican politician who served two terms as a city commissioner.

Davidson was born in 1896 in Philadelphia, the oldest child of Russian Jewish immigrants Mayer and Sarah Davidson. He grew up in Center City Philadelphia and joined the U.S. Army in World War I. After the war, Davidson worked in his father's business as a tobacco merchant and became involved with local charities including the Golden Slipper Club. In 1920, he married Anna B. Savar, with whom he had three children.

In 1951, Davidson joined William G. Schmidt as a nominee for city commissioner. For that office, each party nominates two candidates and the top three are elected. The office was a county office, a holdover from the time before consolidation of the townships in Philadelphia County into one city. The most important of the remaining duties of the commissioners in Philadelphia was the conduct of the city's elections; they also had responsibility for regulating weights and measures. Democrats Maurice S. Osser and Thomas P. McHenry took the top spots, but Davidson narrowly edged out Schmidt for the third and final seat on the commission.

Davidson was reelected in 1955, defeating John J. McGarvey for the third place spot. Four years later, however, Davidson fell to fourth place in the ballot, losing the minority-party seat on the commission to his Republican running mate, Louis Menna. He resumed a business career and continued his charitable work until his death in 1985 at the age of 89.

== Sources ==
- "1920 United States Federal Census, T625_1620, page 7B". Ancestry.com.
- Miller, Joseph H. (July 25, 1951). "Poling and Clark Are Nominated". The Philadelphia Inquirer. pp. 1, 12 – via Newspapers.com.
- Bulletin Almanac 1952. Philadelphia, Pennsylvania: The Philadelphia Bulletin. 1952. OCLC 8641470.
- Bulletin Almanac 1956. Philadelphia, Pennsylvania: The Philadelphia Bulletin. 1956. OCLC 8641470.
- Bulletin Almanac 1960. Philadelphia, Pennsylvania: The Philadelphia Bulletin. 1960. OCLC 8641470.
- Office of the City Representative (1962). Decade of Progress : The story of Philadelphia, 1952–1961. Division of Public Information, Office of the City Representative. OCLC 11471789.
- "Walter I. Davidson, 89; was active in civic affairs, charitable drives". The Philadelphia Inquirer. March 1, 1985 – via Newspapers.com.
