= Cherelle Parker =

Mayor of Philadelphia since 2024

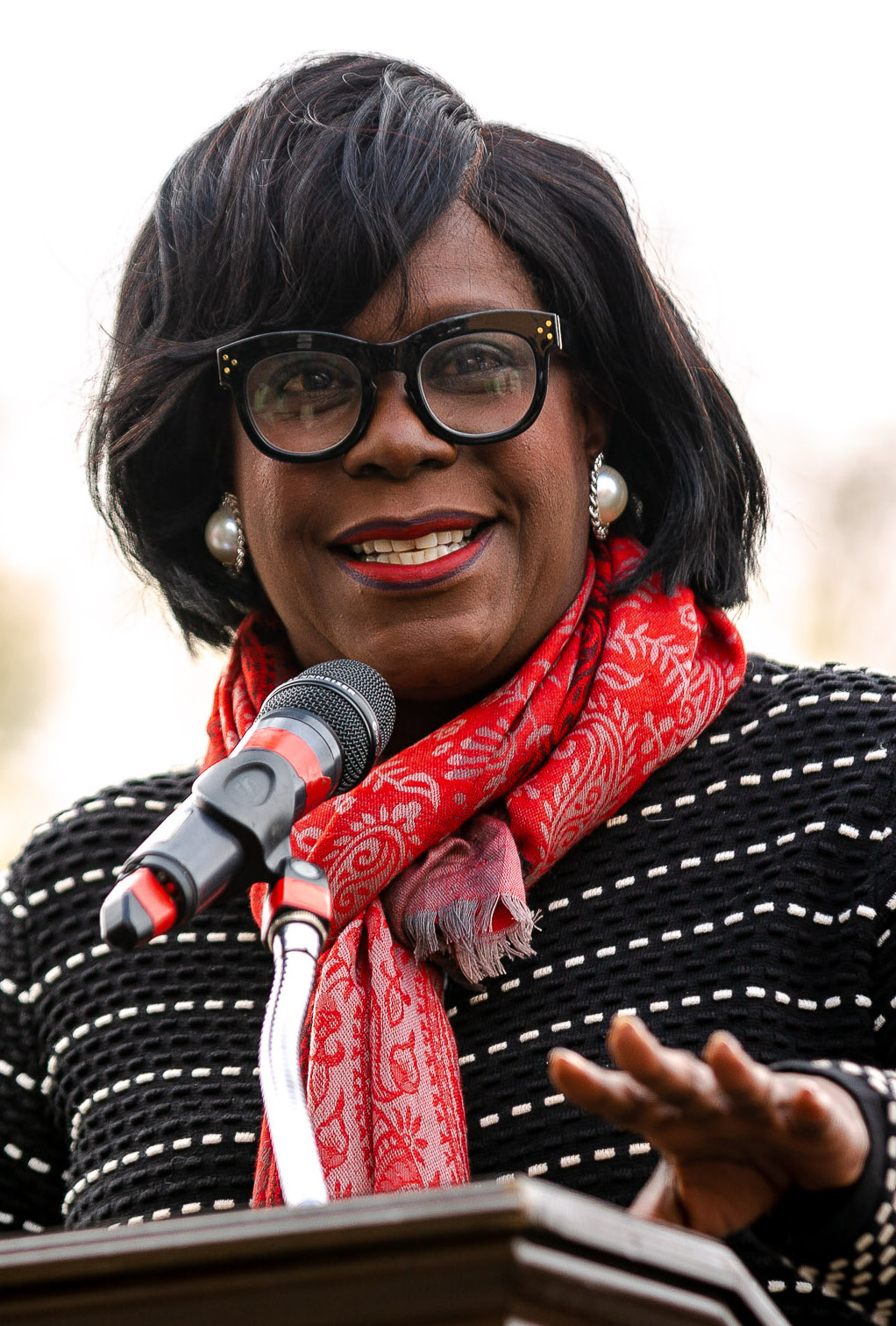
- Parker in 2021

100th Mayor of Philadelphia
- Incumbent
- Assumed office January 1, 2024
- Preceded by: Jim Kenney

Member of the Philadelphia City Council from the 9th district
- In office January 4, 2016 – September 7, 2022
- Preceded by: Marian B. Tasco
- Succeeded by: Anthony Phillips

Member of the Pennsylvania House of Representatives from the 200th district
- In office September 13, 2005 – December 31, 2015
- Preceded by: LeAnna Washington
- Succeeded by: Tonyelle Cook-Artis

Personal details
- Born: September 9, 1972 (age 54) Philadelphia, Pennsylvania, U.S.
- Party: Democratic
- Spouse: Ben Mullins (m. 2010, divorced)
- Children: 1
- Education: Lincoln University (BS); University of Pennsylvania (MPA)
- Website: Campaign website

Cherelle Lesley Parker (born September 9, 1972) is an American politician and former educator serving as the 100th mayor of Philadelphia since 2024. A member of the Democratic Party, she is the first woman to hold the office.

Parker served in the Pennsylvania House of Representatives representing the 200th district in Northwest Philadelphia from 2005 to 2015. She was elected to represent the ninth district on the Philadelphia City Council in 2015 and re-elected in 2019, serving as majority leader from 2020 to 2022.

In September 2022, Parker resigned from City Council and announced her candidacy in the 2023 Philadelphia mayoral election. She won the Democratic primary in May 2023, going on to defeat Republican David Oh in the general election in November.

== Early life and education ==
Parker was born in the Mount Airy neighborhood of Northwest Philadelphia to an unmarried teenage mother. Her mother died when Parker was 11, and she was raised by her grandparents, a disabled U.S. Navy veteran and a domestic worker who both grew up in the South.

In 1990, as a senior at Parkway High School, Parker won a citywide oratorical competition. In winning the competition, she was awarded a cash prize, a trip to Senegal and Morocco, and was introduced to then-Philadelphia City Council member Marian B. Tasco, who hired Parker as an intern.

Parker graduated from Lincoln University in 1994. She is a member of the Delta Sigma Theta sorority.

After graduating from Lincoln University in 1994, Parker worked briefly as a high school English teacher in Pleasantville, New Jersey, and then returned to Marian B. Tasco's office in 1995, where she did a variety of roles for a decade.

== Pennsylvania House of Representatives ==
In 2005, Parker ran in a special election to the Pennsylvania House of Representatives to fill an open seat vacated by LeAnna Washington after Washington was elected to the Pennsylvania State Senate. Parker won the election, and became the youngest Black woman ever elected to the Pennsylvania General Assembly. She remained in that office for ten years, and for five years was chair of the Philadelphia delegation. In the Pennsylvania House of Representatives, she supported the "Philadelphia Tax Fairness Package", a new and special tax on the purchase of cigarettes, and the Act 75, which in 2012 amended state law to allow expert testimony in sexual assault cases.

== Philadelphia City Council ==
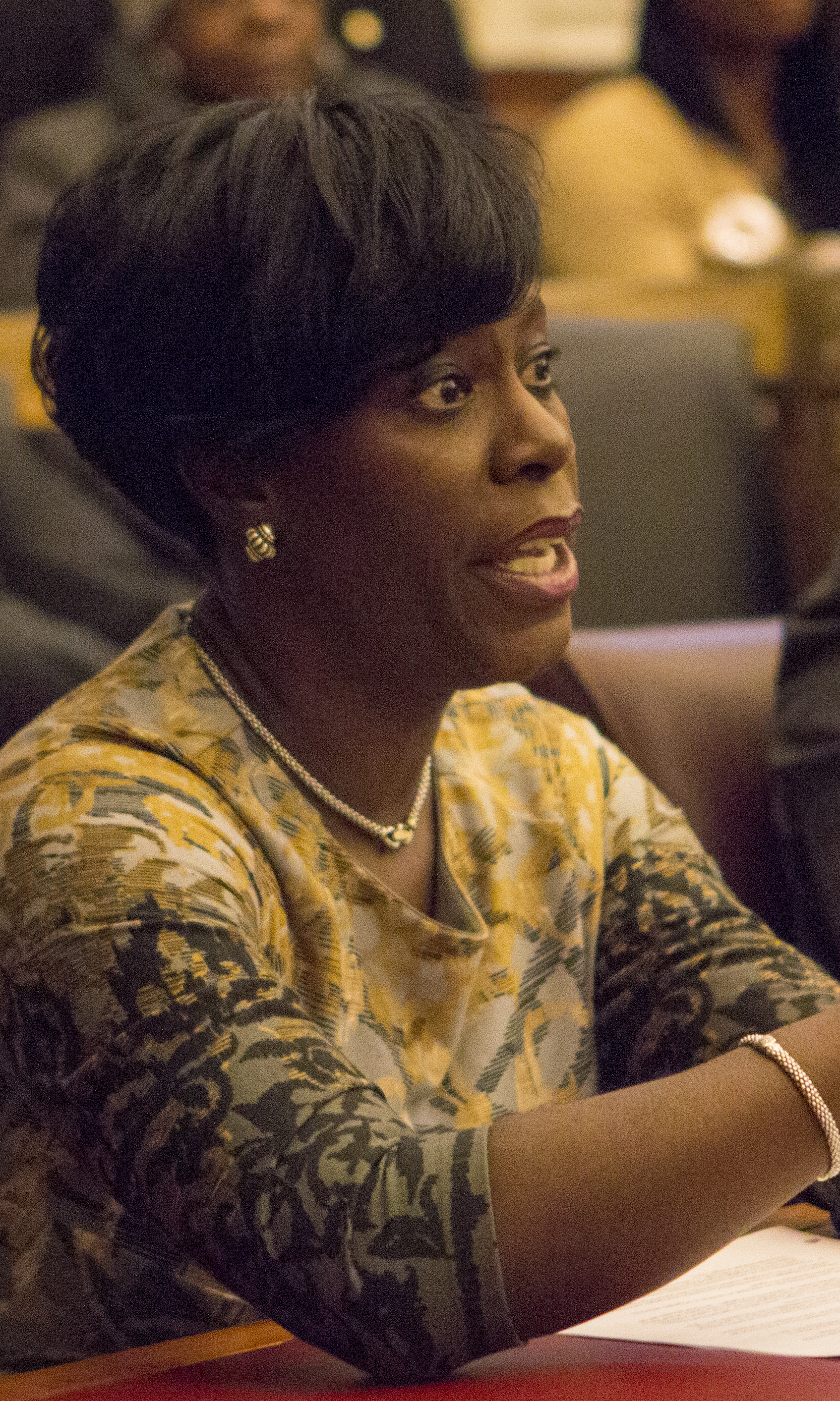
Parker in 2016

Marian B. Tasco retired from Philadelphia city council in 2015, and encouraged Parker to succeed her. She was supported by the city's Democratic Party, and won. As a member of the Philadelphia City Council, she led the passage of the "Philly First Home" program, which aids first-time home buyers in meeting down payments and closing costs on the purchase of a home. In 2016, she graduated from the Fels Institute of Government of the University of Pennsylvania with a degree in Public Administration.

In January 2020, Parker defeated Bobby Henon to become majority leader for Democrats on the city council. In February 2021, Parker was elected the chair of the board for the Delaware River Port Authority.

On city council, Parker focused on housing policy, opposed Jim Kenney's soda tax, and increased community policing.

== Mayor of Philadelphia ==
=== 2023 Election campaign ===
==== Primary election ====
On September 7, 2022, Parker resigned from the City Council and announced her candidacy for Mayor of Philadelphia in the 2023 election. Following her resignation, she also registered as a lobbyist in Pennsylvania, and secured Longwood Gardens and Moore College of Art and Design as clients.

In the mayoral campaign primary, Parker ran as a moderate Democrat compared to other more progressive candidates. Her campaign focused on crime and public safety, pledging to hire 300 new police officers and opposing the establishment of a supervised injection site for heroin and other injectable drugs in Philadelphia.

As a Philadelphia City Council member, Parker opposed the police tactic of "stop and frisk", also known as a Terry stop. But during her campaign for mayor, she reversed her position on them, saying, "Terry stops are what I wholeheartedly embrace as a tool that law enforcement needs, to make the public safety of our city their number one priority. It is a legal tool."

Polling ahead of the mayoral primary found that Parker was in a statistical tie with Rebecca Rhynhart and Helen Gym. Parker was endorsed by several labor unions and members of the city's political establishment, including former mayoral candidates Maria Quiñones-Sánchez and Derek S. Green. Parker lagged in fundraising behind most of the major candidates. Campaign finance reports showed she and Rhynhart were the only two candidates to raise a majority of their funds from Philadelphia residents.

On May 16, 2023, Parker was declared the winner of the Democratic primary, receiving 32.6% of the vote and defeating her closest opponent by ten percentage points, due to her strong support in Black and low-income neighborhoods in the city.

==== General election ====
Parker faced Republican city council member David Oh in the general election.

For almost a month after securing the Democratic primary, Parker did not campaign, citing complications from an earlier dental root canal procedure. Even after recovering, Parker refused to debate Oh, claiming that the 7 to 1 voter registration advantage the Democrats made any effort to interact with Oh a waste of campaign resources. Jennifer Stefano in The Philadelphia Inquirer called Parker's decision not to debate Oh "Trumpesque" and "a danger to our democracy". Lauren Cristella, president and CEO of the Committee of Seventy, also criticized Parker's refusal to debate Oh, saying it would be the first time in 24 years without a debate between the city's mayoral candidates in the general election.

Parker agreed to participate in a joint interview with Oh at the Please Touch Museum, where they took questions from children related to their vision of Philadelphia. Parker said she wishes to see Philadelphia be the "safest, cleanest, and greenest big city in the nation, with economic opportunity for all". Shortly afterwards, Parker reversed her position on debating Oh and agreed to participate in a single debate on October 26 on Philadelphia's Morning News, KYW radio program. As of September 27, Parker had only raised an additional $875,000 in campaign donations compared to her $2.2 million raised during the primary, but she spent roughly twice that of Oh, who raised a total of $467,000.

Parker defeated Oh with 75% of the vote in the general election, which was the lowest showing by a Democrat since John F. Street in the 2003 election.

=== Mayoral term ===
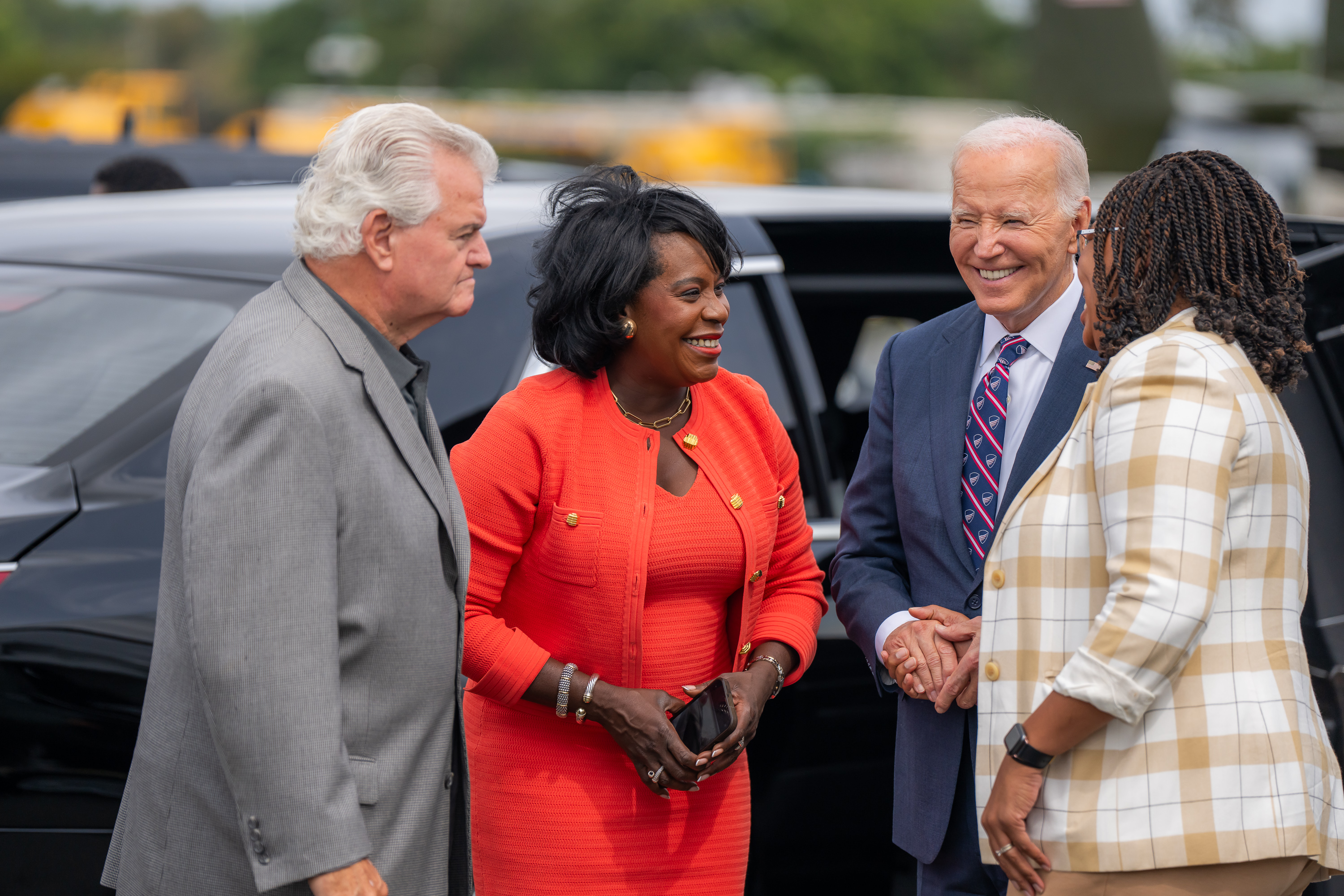
Parker with President Joe Biden, Bob Brady, and Monica Taylor in 2024

Parker's term as mayor began at midnight on January 1, 2024, but she was not formally sworn in until January 2 to avoid conflicting with the Mummers Parade, an annual New Year's Day tradition in Philadelphia. In contrast to her predecessors, her transition team was slow to appoint commissioners for a majority of city agencies, leaving some departments without permanent leadership for over a month into Parker's mayoral term, while others retained appointees from the Jim Kenney administration.

Parker's administration proposed a media policy which required all public statements to be approved by the Mayor's Office of Communications, drawing criticism from many branches of the Free Library of Philadelphia, who warned on the evening before the policy went into effect that it would prevent branches from communicating promptly with patrons about programming and unplanned closures. Staff also cited concerns that the policy could be used to censor print and digital content. After public outcry, the policy was reversed.

Parker ordered a return to full-time, in-person work for city employees by July 15, 2024.

==== Budget ====
On March 14, Parker released her proposed city budget for fiscal year 2024–2025. The budget plan proposed increased funding for the police and for city cleaning and greening efforts, as well as an increase in the School District of Philadelphia's share of the real estate tax. Unlike previous mayors, Parker's first budget proposal did not include a major, potentially controversial spending priority. The mayor's office received the largest funding increase of any city department, with its budget growing by 151% and the mayor's direct staff increasing from 39 positions to 113. Parker proposed a $1 million cut to funding for Prevention Point, a harm reduction and syringe exchange organization that operates in Kensington. This proposal was criticized by physicians and public health researchers, with the city's Director of HIV Health saying it would lead to a spike in HIV cases among needle users. The budget cut funding for Vision Zero, an initiative to end traffic deaths, and initially did not include funding needed by the Philadelphia Housing Authority to develop the site of the UC Townhomes, though that funding was later added. Tax rates remained flat and two property tax relief programs were expanded, while code enforcement and sanitation programs received budget increases.

==== Public safety ====
On April 11, Parker visited Kensington to commemorate her 100th day in office and released her public safety plan for the neighborhood and the city at large. On May 8, Parker ordered police and municipal workers to clear a large encampment between McPherson Square and Allegheny Ave in Kensington. Witnesses reported sanitation workers using water hoses and leaf blowers to drive people off the streets. Several harm-reduction advocates refused an order by police to disperse. Of around 75 people who were counted living on the block, the Parker administration said 59 were placed in a shelter or treatment since April, with 31 institutionalized after the encampment clearance. On September 4, 34 people were arrested during another encampment sweep in Kensington. One woman arrested that day, Amanda Cahill, was found dead in her jail cell three days later.

==== Proposed Sixers arena ====
In September 2024, Parker released a statement announcing her support for the proposed 76 Place at Market East development, despite objections from neighboring Chinatown and other community groups. She had launched a citywide tour to promote the agreement and vigorously pushed City Council to pass the necessary legislation. However, the owners of the Philadelphia 76ers and Wells Fargo Center, where the 76ers have been playing since 1996, worked out a deal to build a New South Philadelphia Arena, resulting in some observers saying that she and the lawmakers who backed the project were used as a bargaining chip in negotiations between the Sixers ownership and Comcast leaders.

==== Immigration ====
During the second Trump administration, Parker administration officials avoided calling Philadelphia a "sanctuary city" and instead called it a "welcoming city." After police forcefully arrested 15 people at a protest against an ICE raid in the city, Parker warned that city police would take an assertive approach to maintaining order at the No Kings protest.

==== 2025 Municipal Employees' Strike ====
On July 1, 2025, nearly 10,000 city workers represented by the American Federation of State, County and Municipal Employees union began striking to demand the city increase their pay and benefits. The striking employees included 911, water, and sanitation workers, among other areas. As a result, Parker announced that residential garbage collection would be suspended until the strike subsided. A city judge later ordered some 911 and water department employees back to work. Residents began referring to hulking piles of garbage around the city as "Parker Piles."

==== United States Semiquincentennial celebrations ====
In September 2025, Parker unveiled her plan to invest $100 million in improvements to Philadelphia to celebrate the United States Semiquincentennial, which included events and city beautification.

In March 2026, she announced an effort to bring the semiquincentennial celebrations to every neighborhood in the city with 250 community block parties. The city provided kits as part of the program which included decorations, games, activities, and supplies to help residents host their own block parties. The city also announced the “One Philly Unity Concert for America”, a free concert featuring musical performances by Christina Aguilera and Will Smith, among other musicians, in conjunction with the semiquincentennial. A report by The Philadelphia Inquirer detailed that the 2026 concert is estimated to cost $15.5 million, in comparison to $6.6 million for the previous year's July 4th concert and events.

==== City beautification ====
In January 2026, Parker and state officials announced the “Gateways to Philadelphia” project, which included $11.5 million of city, state, and nonprofit funding to reduce graffiti and increase greenery. The beautification efforts were in preparation for the 2026 FIFA World Cup, the United States Semiquincentennial, and the 2026 MLB All-Star Game. The project included partnerships with Mural Arts Philadelphia and the Pennsylvania Horticultural Society. Seven installations were completed for the initiative as of May 2026.

==== Trash contract ====
In September 2026, Parker moved to renew a contract with Reworld at a disposal facility in Chester. Several members of city council, including Jamie Gauthier, stated their opposition to the renewal, citing that it would cause harmful pollution to Chester and perpetuate environmental racism. City Sanitation Commissioner Crystal Jacobs Shipman responded that the plan to renew the contract had already considered the financial and environmental impacts, and had found no issues with regarding either, and that the renewal would create roughly $7 million in savings for trash disposal. Chester mayor Stefan Roots opposes continued trash burning in Chester, citing health, economic, and environmental concerns.

== Political positions ==
=== Education ===
In 2023, Parker supported opening schools for a longer duration of the day and mandatory year-round schooling, arguing that "children are no longer working the farms in summertime". She proposed launching a pilot program, and increasing the allocation of real estate taxes that go toward the Philadelphia School District from 55% to 58% to accommodate for the increased air conditioning costs associated with longer operating hours during the school year.

=== Public safety ===
Parker's platform was described as "tough on crime". Parker opposes supervised injection sites. She supported Terry stops, also known as "constitutional stop-and-frisk", in her mayoral campaign after having previously fought to end them on the Philadelphia City Council, labeling them unconstitutional and discriminatory. In a 2022 op-ed for The Philadelphia Inquirer, Parker pledged to hire 300 additional police officers.

== Personal life ==
In 2010, Parker married Ben Mullins, a leader in the International Brotherhood of Electrical Workers. They live in the Mount Airy section of Philadelphia, and have a son, Langston, who was named after Langston Hughes.

In 2011, Parker was arrested for driving under the influence of alcohol after she was stopped for driving the wrong way on a one-way street. She was convicted, and after losing an appeal in 2015, was sentenced to three days in jail, a $1,000 fine, and a one-year driver's license suspension.

In 2025, Parker received an honorary degree from Rosemont College after delivering the commencement address.

== See also ==
- List of members of Philadelphia City Council since 1952
- List of first African-American mayors

Pennsylvania House of Representatives
Preceded by LeAnna Washington	Member of the Pennsylvania House of Representatives from the 200th district 2005–2015	Succeeded by Tonyelle Cook-Artis
Political offices
Preceded by Jim Kenney	Mayor of Philadelphia; 2024–present	Incumbent
