= 2023 Philadelphia mayoral election =

- November 7, 2023
- Turnout: 31.07% ▲
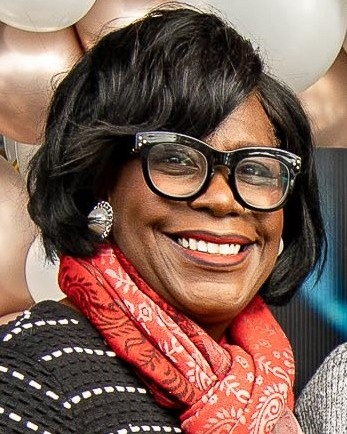

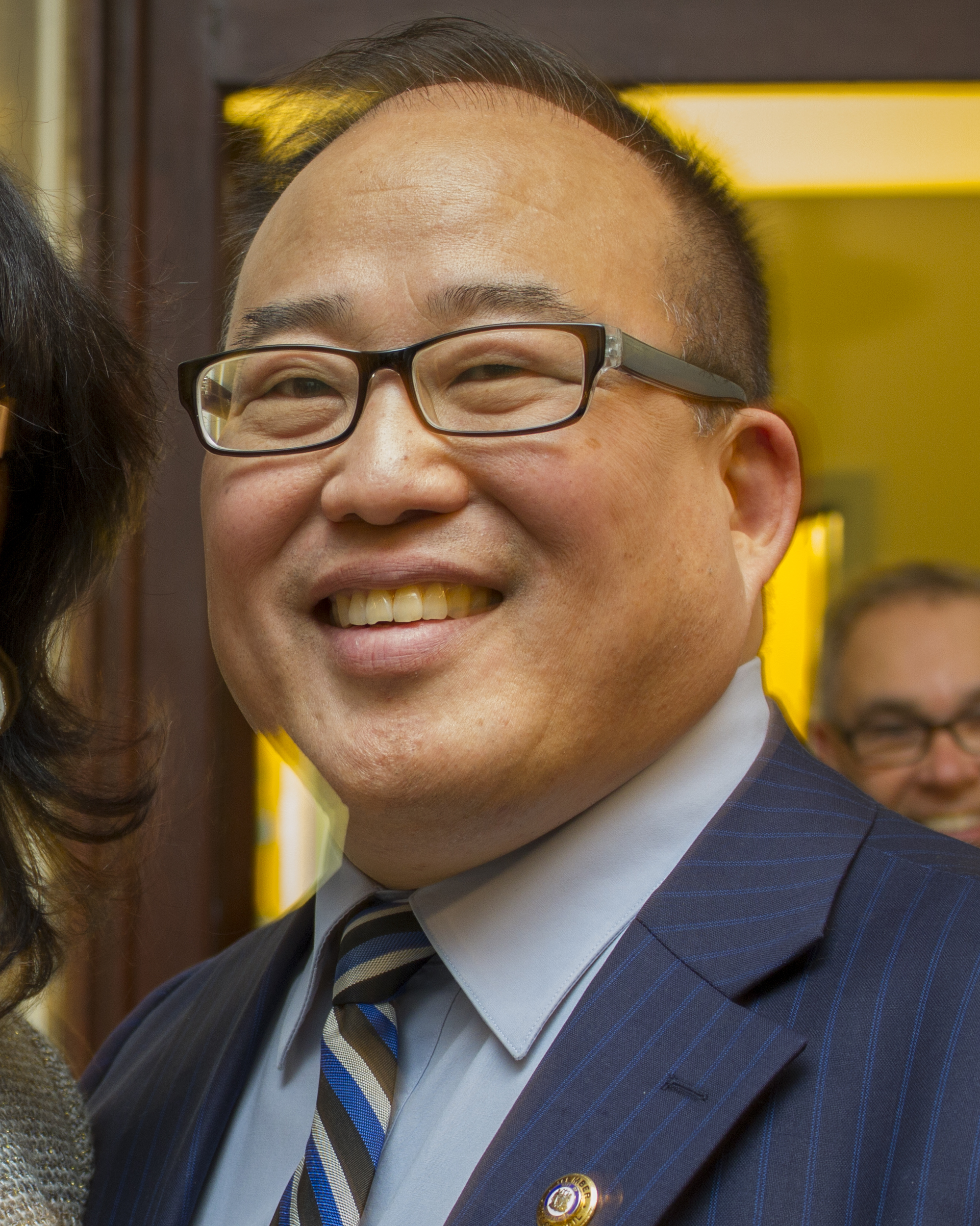
Nominee	Cherelle Parker	David Oh
Party	Democratic	Republican
Popular vote	232,075	75,677
Percentage	74.72%	24.36%
- Parker: 40–50% 50–60% 60–70% 70–80% 80–90% >90% Oh: 40–50% 50–60% 60–70% 70–80% 80–90% Tie: 40–50% 50%
Mayor before election
Jim Kenney
Democratic
Elected mayor
Cherelle Parker
Democratic

The 2023 Philadelphia mayoral election was held on November 7, 2023 to elect the mayor of Philadelphia. Nominees for the Democratic and Republican parties were selected through primaries on May 16, 2023.

Incumbent Democratic mayor Jim Kenney was term limited and could not seek reelection to a third term. Philadelphia's three most recent mayors were previously members of Philadelphia City Council who resigned their seats to run for mayor due to the "resign to run" provision of Philadelphia's election law. Former Philadelphia District Attorney Ed Rendell (1992–2000) was the last mayor who never served in the Philadelphia City Council.

Notable Democratic candidates included former city councilmembers Allan Domb, Helen Gym, and Cherelle Parker; state representative Amen Brown; former municipal judge James DeLeon; former city controller Rebecca Rhynhart; businessman Jeff Brown; and pastor Warren Bloom Sr. Cherelle Parker won the Democratic primary on September 3 to go on and become the nominee. The Republican nominee is former longtime At-Large City Councilmember David Oh, who ran unopposed in his party's primary.

Parker was heavily favored in the general election, as Philadelphia has not elected a Republican mayor since 1947. Kenney was re-elected with 80% of the vote in 2019, while Democrat Joe Biden carried the city of Philadelphia with 81% of the vote in 2020. Oh still overperformed compared to previous Republicans, however, garnering nearly 25% of the vote - more than any Republican mayoral candidate since Sam Katz in 2003.

== Democratic primary ==
=== Background ===
In 2019, incumbent Mayor Jim Kenney was re-elected to his second and final term. Polling in March 2022 showed Kenney with a 55% approval rating among Philadelphia Democrats, while an equal percentage said the city was moving in the wrong direction.

Gun violence and public safety were top issues in the election. While Philadelphia saw 8% fewer homicides in 2022 than in 2021, the city recorded more than 500 homicides for the second year in a row. After a shooting at the city's July 4 celebration, Mayor Kenney told reporters he will "be happy" when he is no longer mayor, prompting City Council members Derek S. Green and Allan Domb to call for his resignation.

In August 2022, Allan Domb resigned from City Council ahead of an expected run for mayor but did not announce his candidacy until November of that year. In September, Derek Green, Maria Quiñones-Sánchez, and Cherelle Parker also resigned from City Council and announced their candidacies. City Controller Rebecca Rhynhart joined the race in October, followed by ShopRite retailer Jeff Brown and City Council member Helen Gym in November. State Representative Amen Brown announced his campaign in December.

=== Candidates ===
==== Nominee ====
Candidate	Experience	Announced	Ref
Cherelle Parker	Philadelphia City Councilmember for the 9th district (2016–2022); Pennsylvania state representative for the 200th district (2005–2015)	September 7, 2022 Website	

==== Eliminated in primary ====
Candidate	Experience	Announced	Ref
Warren Bloom Sr.	Pastor; Acting Committeemember from Ward 6, Division 5 (2021)	December 2, 2022 Website	
Amen Brown	Pennsylvania state representative for the 10th district (2021–present)	December 16, 2022 Website	
Jeff Brown	Businessman; Owner of several ShopRite locations	November 16, 2022 Website	
James DeLeon	Philadelphia Municipal Judge (1984–2021)	November 22, 2022 Website	
Allan Domb	At-large Philadelphia City Councilmember (2016–2022); Real estate developer	November 15, 2022 Website	
Helen Gym	At-large Philadelphia City Councilmember (2016–2022)	November 30, 2022 Website	
Rebecca Rhynhart	Philadelphia City Controller (2018–2022)	October 25, 2022 Website	

==== Other declared candidates ====
- Delscia Gray

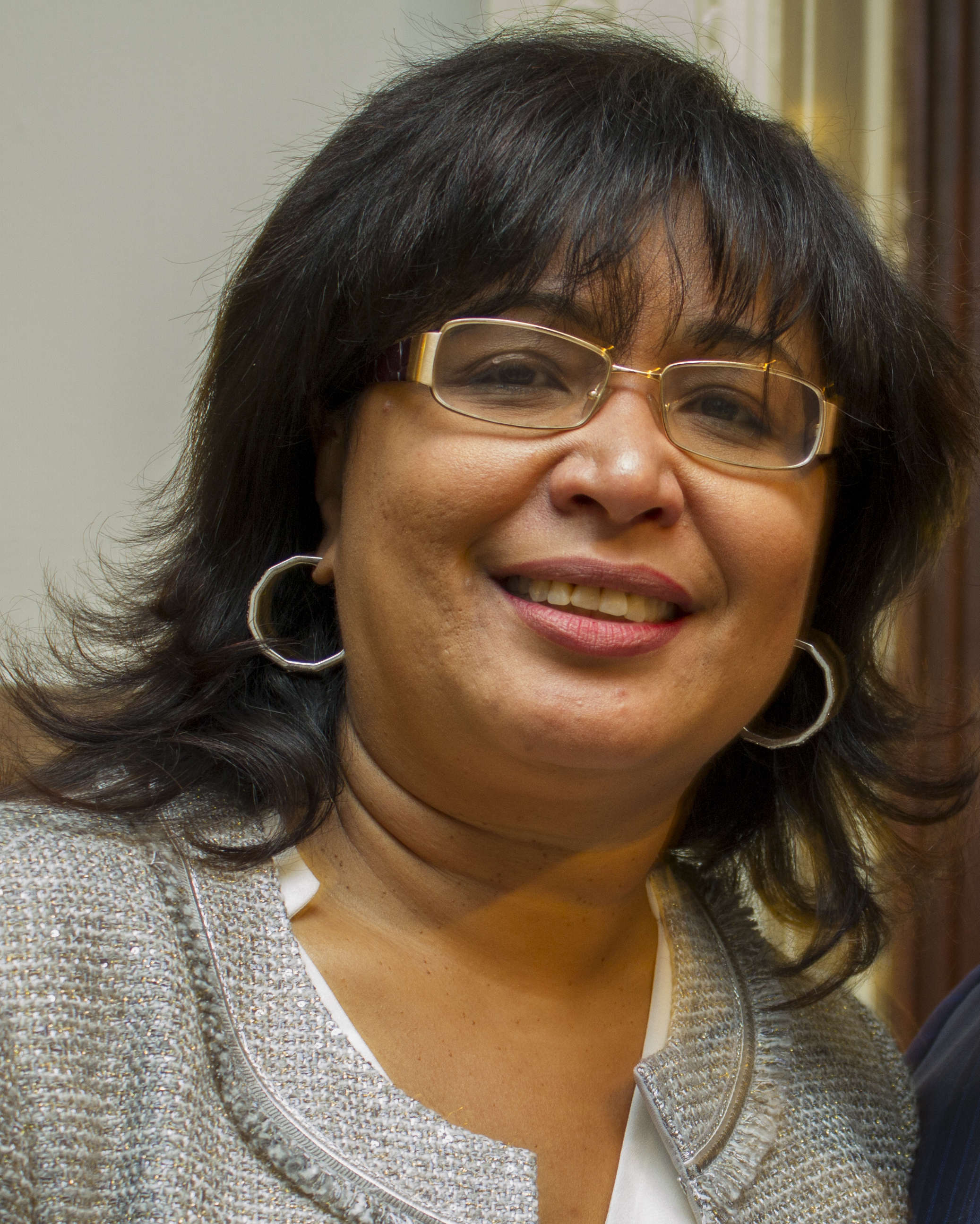
Philadelphia city councilmember Maria Quiñones-Sánchez dropped out, citing the "obnoxious, obscene amount of money that is shaping the race."

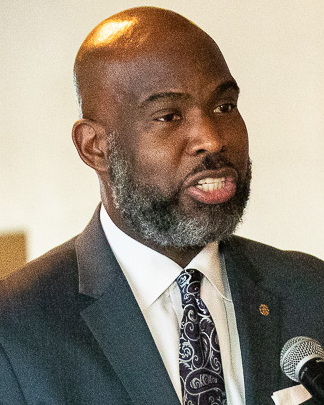
Philadelphia city councilmember, Derek S. Green withdrew from the race in April 2023.

==== Withdrew ====
- Derek S. Green, At-large Philadelphia City Councilmember (2016–2022) (endorsed Parker)
- Maria Quiñones-Sánchez, Philadelphia City Councilmember for the 7th district (2008–2022) (endorsed Parker)
- John Wood, former Philadelphia police lieutenant and U.S. Marine Corps veteran

==== Did not qualify ====
- Joseph Anthony Tartaglia

==== Declined ====
- Cindy Bass, Philadelphia City Councilmember from the 8th district (2012–present) (running for re-election)
- Howard Eskin, sports radio personality on 94.1 WIP
- Vincent Hughes, Pennsylvania state senator from the 7th district (1994–present)
- Keith Leaphart, entrepreneur, philanthropist, physician and Executive on Loan to the city of Philadelphia (2007)
- Michael Nutter, Mayor of Philadelphia (2008–2016) (endorsed Rhynhart)
- Mike Stack, former Lieutenant Governor of Pennsylvania (2015–2019) (endorsed Domb)

=== Campaign ===
In November 2022, The Philadelphia Inquirer reported that former city councilmember Cherelle Parker had the "competitive advantage as the race gets underway." The Inquirer credited her "competitive advantage" to her close ties to labor unions in Philadelphia and her role as the Democratic leader of Northwest Philadelphia's 50th Ward, which is home to older middle-class Black voters, who boast some of the highest voter turnout.

Helen Gym has been described as the favored candidate by progressive activists. She faced early attacks from fellow candidates, who have criticized her votes in City Council to oppose greater funding for the Philadelphia Police Department.

In December 2022, Jeff Brown became the first candidate to run TV ads. The ads highlight his work opening grocery stores in "underserved communities" and accuses his rivals from City Council of inaction. This coincided with Brown receiving endorsements from some of Philadelphia's most powerful labor unions including the chapters of the American Federation of State, County, and Municipal Employees, Transport Workers Union of America and United Food and Commercial Workers. Brown faced controversy when he aired an ad that showed an old clip of former First Lady Michelle Obama praising him. An advisor to Obama said that she does not get involved in Democratic primaries and criticized the ad for implying that she had endorsed Brown.

Campaign finance reports, released in early April, showed Allan Domb and Jeff Brown as having raised the most money of the candidates. The report showed that Domb had raised $2.6 million, with a $2 million being self-financed. In comparison, Brown raised $2 million with $800,000 being self-financed. The report also showed that more than half of the money donated came from outside of Philadelphia. Only Parker and Rhynhart raised a majority of their funds from Philadelphia donors.

Longtime city councilmember Maria Quiñones-Sánchez was originally a candidate, but withdrew on April 10, citing an "obnoxious, obscene amount of money that is shaping the race." Quiñones-Sánchez failed to win the endorsement of any labor unions and her $800,000 in campaign funds paled in comparison to other candidates in the race, who were primarily self-funding their campaigns.

On April 10, The Philadelphia Board of Ethics sued "For A Better Philadelphia", a super PAC and nonprofit, by the same name, supporting Jeff Brown's candidacy. The Board of Ethics investigation found an "extensive and elaborate scheme to circumvent the city's campaign contribution limits." In addition, the Board of Ethics said that Brown engaged in fundraising for "For A Better Philadelphia" by directing donors to give to the outside spending group. If Brown coordinated with the PAC, then the PAC's spending would be subject to the city's limits on political donations. The Philadelphia Board of Ethics asked a judge to issue an emergency order prohibiting the super PAC and nonprofit from spending money to support Brown.

In May 2023, two canvassers working for the group One PA, who were canvassing for Gym and a candidate for City Council, got into an altercation, which resulted in a fatal shooting.

=== Debates ===
2023 Philadelphia mayoral election Democratic primary debates
No.	Date	Host	Moderator	Link	Participants								
Key: P Participant A Absent N Non-invitee I Invitee W Withdrawn													
Key: P Participant A Absent N Non-invitee I Invitee W Withdrawn					Warren Bloom	Amen Brown	Jeff Brown	Allan Domb	James DeLeon	Derek S. Green	Helen Gym	Cherelle Parker	Rebecca Rhynhart
1	April 11, 2023	Fox29; Temple University	Jeff Cole; Thomas Drayton; Jason Martinez; Shiba Russell	Video	N	P	P	P	N	P	P	P	P
2	April 21, 2023	CBS 3 Chamber of Commerce for Greater Philadelphia; Museum of the American Revolution	Ernest Owens	Video	N	P	P	P	N	W	P	P	P
3	April 25, 2023	6 ABC; Philadelphia Association of Black Journalists; Museum of the American Revolution	Matt O'Donnell	Video	N	P	P	P	N	W	P	P	P

=== Endorsements ===
Amen Brown

Statewide officials

- George Bochetto, former Pennsylvania State Boxing Commissioner (1996–2002) and candidate for U.S. Senate in 2022 (Republican)

Pennsylvania state senators

- Vince Fumo, 1st district (1978–2008) and convicted felon

Pennsylvania state representatives

- John Perzel, former PA House Speaker (2003–2007) from the 172nd district (1979–2010) and convicted felon (Republican)
Jeff Brown

Labor unions

- American Federation of State, County, and Municipal Employees – District Council 33 and Local 159
- Fraternal Order of Police – Lodge 5
- International Alliance of Theatrical Stage Employees Local 8
- International Brotherhood of Teamsters – Joint Council 53 and Local 830
- Pennsylvania Conference of Teamsters
- Retail, Wholesale, and Department Store Union Local 108
- Temple University Police Association
- Transport Workers Union of America – Local 234
- United Food and Commercial Workers – Local 152, 360 and 1776

Organizations

- National Black Police Association Guardian Civic League - Philadelphia chapter
Allan Domb

Statewide officials

- Mike Stack, former Lieutenant Governor of Pennsylvania (2015–2019) and former state senator from the 5th district (2001–2015)

Philadelphia mayors

- Bill Green III, former mayor of Philadelphia (1980–1984) and former U.S. Representative from PA-3 (1964–1977)

Organizations

- Greater Philadelphia Association of Realtors

Individuals

- Bernard Hopkins, former professional boxer
Derek S. Green (withdrawn)

Notable individuals

- Ken Snyder, principal and co-founder of SnyderPickerill Media Group (Green's campaign spokesperson)
Helen Gym

U.S. Senators

- Bernie Sanders, U.S. Senator from Vermont (2007–present) and Democratic candidate for President of the United States in 2016 and 2020 (Independent)

U.S. Representatives

- Jamaal Bowman, NY-16 (2021–present)
- Greg Casar, TX-35 (2023–present)
- Andy Kim, NJ-3 (2019–present)
- Alexandria Ocasio Cortez, NY-14 (2019–present)
- Ayanna Pressley, MA-7 (2019–present)

Pennsylvania state senators

- Nikil Saval, SD-1 (2021–present)

Pennsylvania state representatives

- Elizabeth Fiedler, HD-184 (2019–present)
- Tarik Khan, HD-194 (2023–present)
- Rick Krajewski, HD-188 (2021–present)

Other state legislators

- Yuh-Line Niou, former New York State Assemblymember from the 65th district (2017–2022)

Local officials

- Brandon Johnson, Mayor of Chicago (2023–present) and former Cook County Commissioner from the 1st district (2018–2023)
- Michelle Wu, Mayor of Boston (2021–present)

Philadelphia city councilmembers

- Kendra Brooks, at-large (2020–present) (Working Families)
- Jamie Gauthier, District 3 (2020–present)
- Wilson Goode Jr., at-large (2000–2016)

Party officials

- Maurice Mitchell, musician and national director of the Working Families Party (2018–present) (Working Families)

Individuals

- Benjamin Abella, University of Pennsylvania professor
- Michael Coard, radio host on WURD and Temple University professor
- Jane Fonda, actress and former model
- Marc Lamont Hill, Temple University professor, host of UpFront (2021–present), and former CNN and Fox News commentator
- Cynthia Nixon, actress and theater director
- Eliza Orlins, lawyer and TV personality
- Mark Ruffalo, actor and producer

Labor unions

- AFSCME – District Council 47, Local 397, and Please Touch Museum United
- American Federation of Teachers – National, Pennsylvania, Philadelphia, Philadelphia Local 3, United Academics of Philadelphia, Community College of Philadelphia, and Temple University chapters
- Health Professionals and Allied Employees
- Teamsters Brotherhood of Maintenance of Way Employes Division and Local 623
- UNITE HERE Philadelphia – Local #54, #274, #634

Organizations

- AAPI Victory Fund
- Asian American Action Fund
- Center for Biological Diversity Action Fund
- Food & Water Action
- Friends of the Earth Action Fund
- League of Conservation Voters of Pennsylvania
- Our Revolution
- People's Action
- Progressive Change Campaign Committee
- Reclaim Philadelphia
- Sierra Club Pennsylvania and Southeastern Pennsylvania chapters
- Sunrise Movement Philadelphia
- United We Dream Action
- University of Pennsylvania Young Democratic Socialists of America
- Make the Road Action

Political parties

- Working Families Party
Cherelle Parker

U.S. representatives

- Brendan Boyle, PA-2 (2015–present)
- Dwight Evans, PA-3 (2016–present)

Pennsylvania state senators

- Jimmy Dillon, SD-5 (2022–present)
- Art Haywood, SD-4 (2015–present)
- Vincent Hughes, SD-7 (1994–present)
- Shirley Kitchen, SD-3 (1996–2016)
- Sharif Street, SD-3 (2017–present) and Pennsylvania Democratic Party chair (2022–present)
- Tina Tartaglione, SD-2 (1995–present)

Pennsylvania state representatives

- Leslie Acosta, HD-197 (2015–2017) and convicted felon
- Anthony Bellmon, HD-203 (2023–present)
- Kevin Boyle, HD-172 (2011–present)
- Donna Bullock, HD-195 (2015–present)
- Danilo Burgos, HD-197 (2019–present)
- Morgan Cephas, HD-192 (2017–present)
- Angel Cruz, HD-180 (2001–2022)
- Pat Gallagher, HD-173 (2023–present)
- Jose Giral, HD-180 (2023–present)
- Stephen Kinsey, HD-201 (2013–present)
- Darisha Parker, HD-198 (2020–present)
- Benjamin Ramos, HD-180 (1995–2000)
- Emilio Vazquez, HD-197 (2017–2019)

Other state legislators

- Dana Redd, New Jersey state senator, SD-5 (2008–2010) and former Mayor of Camden (2010–2018)
- Stephen Sweeney, president of the New Jersey Senate (2010–2022), SD-3 (2002–2022)

Local officials

- Alan Butkovitz, City Controller (2006–2018)
- Victor Carstarphen, Mayor of Camden (2021–present)

Philadelphia city councilmembers

- Cindy Bass, 8th district (2012–present)
- Darrell Clarke, 5th district (1999–present) and Philadelphia City Council President (2012–present)
- Michael Driscoll, 6th district (2022–present) and former state representative from HD-173 (2015–2022)
- Derek S. Green, at-large (2016–2022) and former 2023 mayoral candidate
- Bill Greenlee, at-large (2006–2020)
- Kenyatta Johnson, 2nd district (2012–present) and former state representative from HD-186 (2009–2012)
- Curtis Jones Jr., 4th district (2008–present)
- Anthony Phillips, 9th district (2022–present)
- Maria Quiñones-Sánchez, 7th district (2008–2022) and former 2023 mayoral candidate
- Mark Squilla, 1st district (2012–present)
- Marian Tasco, 9th district (1998–2016)

Individuals

- Freeway, rapper from the band State Property
- Peedi Peedi, rapper from the band State Property

Labor unions

- AFSCME Locals 403 and 427
- Communication Workers of America District 2–13
- Eastern Atlantic States Council of Carpenters
- IBEW Local 98
- IUPAT District Council 21
- LIUNA Local 332
- Philadelphia Building Trades Council
- SEIU 32BJ
- Sprinkler Fitters Local 692

Newspapers and other media

- Philadelphia Gay News
- The Philadelphia Tribune

Organizations

- Emgage PAC
- NOW – Philadelphia chapter
Maria Quiñones-Sánchez (withdrawn)

Pennsylvania state representatives

- Danilo Burgos, HD-197 (2019–present)
- Jason Dawkins, HD-179 (2015–present)
- Ben Waxman, HD-182 (2022–present)

Local officials

- Quetcy Lozada, Philadelphia city councilmember from the 7th district (2022–present)

Organizations

- Latino Victory Fund
Rebecca Rhynhart

Statewide officials

- Ed Rendell, former Governor of Pennsylvania (2003–2011) and former mayor of Philadelphia (1992–2000)

Philadelphia mayors

- Michael Nutter (2008–2016)
- John Street (2000–2008)

Organizations

- Temple College Democrats

Newspapers and other media

- The Philadelphia Inquirer
Declined to endorse

Philadelphia mayors

- Jim Kenney (2016–2024) (voted for Parker)
- Wilson Goode Sr. (1984–1992)

Political parties

- Philadelphia Democratic Party

=== Polling ===
==== Graphical summary ====
Poll source	Date(s) administered	Sample size (Note: Key: A – all adults RV – registered voters LV – likely voters V – unclear)	Margin of error	A. Brown	J. Brown	DeLeon	Domb	Green	Gym	Quiñones-Sánchez	Parker	Rhynhart	Other	Undecided
Left of Center	May 12–13, 2023	285 (LV)	± 6.0%	–	10%	–	12%	–	18%	–	21%	30%	–	10%
Emerson College	May 7–9, 2023	600 (LV)	± 3.9%	2%	10%	2%	14%	–	21%	–	18%	18%	<1% (Note: Bloom and Gray with <1%)	15%
Data For Progress (Note: This poll was sponsored by Gym's campaign.)	April 26–29, 2023	560 (LV)	± 4.0%	2%	9%	–	13%	–	21%	–	19%	21%	–	14%
SurveyUSA (Note: This poll was sponsored by Committee of Seventy, a non-partisan organization.)	April 21–25, 2023	1,013 (LV)	± 3.8%	2%	11%	1%	14%	–	15%	–	17%	18%	2% (Note: Bloom with 2%)	20%
– (Note: This poll was sponsored by Parker's campaign.)	Week of April 24, 2023	–	–	1%	12%	–	11%	–	16%	–	20%	15%	1%	24%
GBAO (Note: This poll was sponsored by Domb's campaign.)	April 16–19, 2023	600 (LV)	± 4.0%	1%	13%	1%	17%	–	19%	–	16%	21%	–	14%
	April 13, 2023	Green withdraws from the race												
	April 10, 2023	Quiñones-Sánchez withdraws from the race												
FM3 Research (Note: This poll was sponsored by For a Better Philadelphia, a PAC supporting Jeff Brown.)	March 14, 2023	800 (LV)	–	1%	24%	–	15%	2%	15%	7%	7%	12%	–	17%
FM3 Research (Note: This poll was sponsored by For a Better Philadelphia, a PAC supporting Jeff Brown.)	Week of January 16, 2023	607 (LV)	–	–	20%	–	12%	–	15%	–	–	–	–	–
African American Chamber of Commerce	January 14, 2023	524 (RV)	–	–	32%	4%	6%	24%	8%	3%	17%	3%	3%	–

=== Fundraising ===
Campaign finance reports as of April 5, 2023
Candidate	Total raised (in 2023)	Cash on hand
Jeff Brown	$2.1M	$408.7K
Allan Domb	$215K	$1.7M
Derek S. Green (withdrawn)	$1.0M	$303.9K
Helen Gym	$1.7M	$1.4M
Cherelle Parker	$1.2M	$607K
Rebecca Rhynhart	$1.5M	$853.K
Maria Quiñones-Sánchez (withdrawn)	$215K	$321.1K

=== Results ===
Results by ward: Parker: 20%-30%; 30%-40%; 40%-50%; 50%-60%; 60%-70%; 70%-80%; Rhynhart: 20%-30%; 30%-40%; 40%-50%; Gym: 20%-30%; 30%-40%; 40%-50%; 50%-60%; Domb: 20%-30%; 30%-40%

2023 Philadelphia mayoral election, Democratic primary
Party	Candidate	Votes	%
Democratic	Cherelle Parker	81,080	32.65%
Democratic	Rebecca Rhynhart	56,581	22.78%
Democratic	Helen Gym	54,705	22.03%
Democratic	Allan Domb	28,051	11.29%
Democratic	Jeff Brown	21,868	8.80%
Democratic	Amen Brown	3,321	1.34%
Democratic	James DeLeon	1,488	0.60%
Democratic	Delscia Gray	582	0.23%
Democratic	Warren Bloom	499	0.21%
Write-in		163	0.07%
Total votes		248,338	100.0%

Results by Ward

Ward	Parker		Rhynhart		Gym		Domb		J. Brown		A. Brown		DeLeon		Gray		Bloom		Write-in		Total votes
Ward	#	%	#	%	#	%	#	%	#	%	#	%	#	%	#	%	#	%	#	%	Total votes
1	386	8.19%	1,547	32.81%	2,114	44.84%	464	9.84%	168	3.56%	20	0.42%	11	0.23%	4	0.08%	0	0.00%	1	0.02%	4,715
2	736	9.43%	3,344	42.87%	2,806	35.97%	692	8.87%	170	2.18%	19	0.24%	17	0.22%	7	0.09%	4	0.05%	6	0.08%	7,801
3	1,864	55.26%	290	8.60%	377	11.18%	265	7.86%	438	12.99%	102	3.02%	19	0.56%	7	0.21%	10	0.30%	1	0.03%	3,373
4	1,736	56.77%	223	7.29%	257	8.40%	199	6.51%	457	14.94%	146	4.77%	20	0.65%	11	0.36%	6	0.20%	3	0.10%	3,058
5	931	9.18%	4,777	47.09%	2,908	28.66%	1,239	12.21%	222	2.19%	27	0.27%	19	0.19%	8	0.08%	10	0.10%	4	0.04%	10,145
6	1,033	47.04%	213	9.70%	396	18.03%	118	5.37%	285	12.98%	121	5.51%	18	0.82%	4	0.18%	8	0.36%	0	0.00%	2,196
7	468	44.96%	118	11.34%	112	10.76%	187	17.96%	79	7.59%	19	1.83%	43	4.13%	6	0.58%	8	0.77%	1	0.10%	1,041
8	816	7.67%	5,103	47.99%	2,539	23.88%	1,825	17.16%	281	2.64%	28	0.26%	20	0.19%	7	0.07%	12	0.11%	3	0.03%	10,634
9	922	15.52%	2,685	45.19%	1,690	28.44%	404	6.80%	197	3.32%	19	0.32%	15	0.25%	5	0.08%	2	0.03%	3	0.05%	5,942
10	3,928	70.32%	336	6.02%	336	6.02%	278	4.98%	569	10.19%	77	1.38%	41	0.73%	12	0.21%	9	0.16%	0	0.00%	5,586
11	1,027	55.66%	153	8.29%	141	7.64%	172	9.32%	266	14.42%	42	2.28%	19	1.03%	14	0.76%	9	0.49%	2	0.11%	1,845
12	1,849	48.04%	437	11.35%	830	21.56%	186	4.83%	440	11.43%	57	1.48%	32	0.83%	11	0.29%	4	0.10%	3	0.08%	3,849
13	1,617	52.16%	259	8.35%	414	13.35%	240	7.74%	468	15.10%	48	1.55%	35	1.13%	9	0.29%	8	0.26%	2	0.06%	3,100
14	648	41.09%	261	16.55%	340	21.56%	125	7.93%	158	10.02%	24	1.52%	9	0.57%	7	0.44%	4	0.25%	1	0.06%	1,577
15	598	9.96%	2,809	46.79%	1,781	29.66%	633	10.54%	147	2.45%	13	0.22%	10	0.17%	4	0.07%	7	0.12%	2	0.03%	6,004
16	787	58.56%	99	7.37%	121	9.00%	107	7.96%	164	12.20%	41	3.05%	15	1.12%	6	0.45%	4	0.30%	0	0.00%	1,344
17	2,508	61.14%	304	7.41%	301	7.34%	256	6.24%	557	13.58%	111	2.71%	39	0.95%	14	0.34%	10	0.24%	2	0.05%	4,102
18	442	10.40%	1,486	34.96%	1,759	41.39%	381	8.96%	139	3.27%	22	0.52%	8	0.19%	4	0.09%	6	0.14%	3	0.07%	4,250
19	545	50.32%	133	12.28%	183	16.90%	115	10.62%	57	5.26%	17	1.57%	20	1.85%	8	0.74%	5	0.46%	0	0.00%	1,083
20	581	53.11%	116	10.60%	186	17.00%	67	6.12%	109	9.96%	21	1.92%	8	0.73%	2	0.18%	4	0.37%	0	0.00%	1,094
21	1,464	14.47%	3,524	34.84%	3,109	30.73%	1,065	10.53%	844	8.34%	58	0.57%	22	0.22%	6	0.06%	13	0.13%	11	0.11%	10,116
22	2,891	37.66%	1,554	20.24%	2,152	28.03%	415	5.41%	550	7.16%	53	0.69%	32	0.42%	13	0.17%	12	0.16%	5	0.07%	7,677
23	987	46.51%	301	14.18%	258	12.16%	260	12.25%	231	10.89%	40	1.89%	23	1.08%	11	0.52%	10	0.47%	1	0.05%	2,122
24	657	31.47%	301	14.42%	705	33.76%	97	4.65%	203	9.72%	105	5.03%	13	0.62%	6	0.29%	1	0.05%	0	0.00%	2,088
25	241	14.52%	443	26.69%	489	29.46%	309	18.61%	148	8.92%	10	0.60%	8	0.48%	5	0.30%	4	0.24%	3	0.18%	1,660
26	353	10.71%	911	27.64%	677	20.54%	1,061	32.19%	254	7.71%	24	0.73%	8	0.24%	3	0.09%	3	0.09%	2	0.06%	3,296
27	432	16.50%	486	18.56%	1,480	56.53%	81	3.09%	96	3.67%	24	0.92%	13	0.50%	3	0.11%	3	0.11%	0	0.00%	2,618
28	964	59.43%	124	7.64%	117	7.21%	95	5.86%	229	14.12%	67	4.13%	13	0.80%	8	0.49%	5	0.31%	0	0.00%	1,622
29	862	35.83%	524	21.78%	703	29.22%	115	4.78%	156	6.48%	28	1.16%	8	0.33%	5	0.21%	1	0.04%	4	0.17%	2,406
30	641	12.09%	2,484	46.83%	1,553	29.28%	473	8.92%	118	2.22%	16	0.30%	7	0.13%	6	0.11%	5	0.09%	1	0.02%	5,304
31	259	7.08%	1,352	36.96%	1,661	45.41%	247	6.75%	107	2.93%	13	0.36%	3	0.08%	3	0.08%	9	0.25%	4	0.11%	3,658
32	1,378	56.34%	223	9.12%	306	12.51%	138	5.64%	288	11.77%	78	3.19%	15	0.61%	13	0.53%	5	0.20%	2	0.08%	2,446
33	450	38.10%	165	13.97%	155	13.12%	217	18.37%	103	8.72%	35	2.96%	31	2.62%	16	1.35%	6	0.51%	3	0.25%	1,181
34	4,190	55.84%	810	10.79%	822	10.95%	520	6.93%	946	12.61%	140	1.87%	40	0.53%	20	0.27%	13	0.17%	3	0.04%	7,504
35	1,640	50.60%	404	12.47%	431	13.30%	353	10.89%	317	9.78%	37	1.14%	35	1.08%	10	0.31%	11	0.34%	3	0.09%	3,241
36	2,066	30.79%	1,558	23.22%	2,175	32.41%	399	5.95%	389	5.80%	62	0.92%	29	0.43%	17	0.25%	12	0.18%	4	0.06%	6,711
37	851	59.51%	127	8.88%	129	9.02%	110	7.69%	142	9.93%	36	2.52%	16	1.12%	8	0.56%	9	0.63%	2	0.14%	1,430
38	1,135	29.83%	1,056	27.75%	813	21.37%	348	9.15%	379	9.96%	47	1.24%	17	0.45%	5	0.13%	3	0.08%	2	0.05%	3,805
39	1,047	15.27%	1,785	26.03%	2,306	33.63%	1,144	16.68%	468	6.83%	44	0.64%	44	0.64%	8	0.12%	7	0.10%	4	0.06%	6,857
40	3,230	54.31%	517	8.69%	693	11.65%	465	7.82%	821	13.81%	122	2.05%	57	0.96%	20	0.34%	19	0.32%	3	0.05%	5,947
41	450	27.17%	297	17.93%	230	13.89%	417	25.18%	203	12.26%	21	1.27%	19	1.15%	8	0.48%	7	0.42%	4	0.24%	1,656
42	1,148	50.93%	234	10.38%	299	13.27%	202	8.96%	247	10.96%	54	2.40%	40	1.77%	11	0.49%	16	0.71%	3	0.13%	2,254
43	931	54.51%	148	8.67%	151	8.84%	191	11.18%	206	12.06%	27	1.58%	28	1.64%	17	1.00%	9	0.53%	0	0.00%	1,708
44	1,046	50.68%	164	7.95%	248	12.02%	152	7.36%	324	15.70%	104	5.04%	13	0.63%	5	0.24%	5	0.24%	3	0.15%	2,064
45	388	20.93%	472	25.46%	248	13.38%	492	26.54%	206	11.11%	17	0.92%	15	0.81%	7	0.38%	4	0.22%	5	0.27%	1,854
46	1,161	20.55%	894	15.82%	2,988	52.88%	176	3.12%	352	6.23%	50	0.88%	16	0.28%	8	0.14%	2	0.04%	3	0.05%	5,650
47	488	43.11%	180	15.90%	288	25.44%	47	4.15%	98	8.66%	14	1.24%	4	0.35%	7	0.62%	6	0.53%	0	0.00%	1,132
48	1,095	36.03%	468	15.40%	910	29.94%	255	8.39%	236	7.77%	36	1.18%	20	0.66%	11	0.36%	6	0.20%	2	0.07%	3,039
49	2,163	57.90%	306	8.19%	363	9.72%	241	6.45%	519	13.89%	70	1.87%	46	1.23%	16	0.43%	10	0.27%	2	0.05%	3,736
50	5,516	71.11%	500	6.45%	512	6.60%	352	4.54%	735	9.48%	57	0.73%	51	0.66%	8	0.10%	24	0.31%	2	0.03%	7,757
51	1,713	46.27%	302	8.16%	938	25.34%	202	5.46%	437	11.80%	67	1.81%	25	0.68%	12	0.32%	3	0.08%	3	0.08%	3,702
52	3,106	53.52%	652	11.24%	602	10.37%	429	7.39%	815	14.04%	126	2.17%	41	0.71%	12	0.21%	16	0.28%	4	0.07%	5,803
53	902	41.15%	307	14.01%	328	14.96%	343	15.65%	245	11.18%	31	1.41%	20	0.91%	9	0.41%	4	0.18%	3	0.14%	2,192
54	444	36.04%	214	17.37%	208	16.88%	218	17.69%	101	8.20%	20	1.62%	16	1.30%	4	0.32%	3	0.24%	4	0.32%	1,232
55	436	24.94%	366	20.94%	231	13.22%	456	26.09%	216	12.36%	12	0.69%	19	1.09%	9	0.51%	3	0.17%	0	0.00%	1,748
56	743	20.60%	817	22.65%	559	15.50%	961	26.64%	423	11.73%	47	1.30%	32	0.89%	13	0.36%	10	0.28%	2	0.06%	3,607
57	575	18.16%	752	23.75%	375	11.84%	982	31.02%	413	13.04%	30	0.95%	20	0.63%	8	0.25%	9	0.28%	2	0.06%	3,166
58	628	13.62%	1,215	26.34%	609	13.20%	1,463	31.72%	605	13.12%	34	0.74%	27	0.59%	16	0.35%	13	0.28%	2	0.04%	4,612
59	1,939	43.55%	610	13.70%	1,102	24.75%	186	4.18%	486	10.92%	69	1.55%	37	0.83%	11	0.25%	10	0.22%	2	0.04%	4,452
60	1,308	38.18%	318	9.28%	990	28.90%	192	5.60%	340	9.92%	243	7.09%	13	0.38%	10	0.29%	7	0.20%	5	0.15%	3,426
61	2,523	58.21%	425	9.81%	505	11.65%	315	7.27%	442	10.20%	63	1.45%	34	0.78%	11	0.25%	12	0.28%	4	0.09%	4,334
62	942	43.83%	298	13.87%	258	12.01%	333	15.50%	234	10.89%	28	1.30%	25	1.16%	12	0.56%	12	0.56%	7	0.33%	2,149
63	596	17.22%	1,014	29.29%	464	13.40%	928	26.81%	418	12.07%	20	0.58%	12	0.35%	3	0.09%	5	0.14%	2	0.06%	3,462
64	224	16.49%	343	25.26%	179	13.18%	382	28.13%	200	14.73%	11	0.81%	10	0.74%	5	0.37%	3	0.22%	1	0.07%	1,358
65	572	20.42%	715	25.53%	289	10.32%	834	29.78%	338	12.07%	21	0.75%	21	0.75%	2	0.07%	8	0.29%	1	0.04%	2,801
66	883	17.60%	1,228	24.48%	506	10.09%	1,437	28.65%	869	17.32%	36	0.72%	32	0.64%	11	0.22%	11	0.22%	3	0.06%	5,016

== Republican primary ==
=== Candidates ===
==== Nominee ====
Republican nominee
Candidate	Experience	Announced	Ref
David Oh	At-large Philadelphia City Councilmember (2012–2023); Second Lieutenant in the U.S. Army	February 13, 2023 Website	

=== Campaign ===
David Oh, a former longtime At-Large City Councilmember, was the only Republican to run for mayor. Despite Philadelphia being a heavily Democratic city, Oh has established a brand as a Republican willing to clash with both parties and his cultivated a unique base of supporters, particularly among immigrant voters.

=== Endorsements ===
David Oh

Statewide officials

- Tom Ridge, former Governor of Pennsylvania (1995–2001) and former U.S. Secretary of Homeland Security (2003–2005)
- Ronald Castille, former Pennsylvania Supreme Court Justice (1994–2014) and former Philadelphia District Attorney (1986–1991)

Labor unions

- Fraternal Order of Transit Police - Lodge 109

Organizations

- Log Cabin Republicans
- University of Pennsylvania College Republicans

Political parties

- Philadelphia Republican Party

=== Results ===
2023 Philadelphia mayoral election, Republican primary
Party	Candidate	Votes	%
Republican	David Oh	15,355	95.46%
Write-in		730	4.54%
Total votes		16,085	100.0%

== General election ==
=== Post-primary endorsements ===
Cherelle Parker (D)

Individuals

- Cristina Tzintzún Ramirez, labor organizer and president of NextGen America PAC (2021–present)

Newspapers and other media

- The Philadelphia Inquirer

Organizations

- NextGen America

=== Debate ===
A debate between Parker and Oh took place on October 26, 2023, at the studios of KYW NewsRadio.

=== Results ===
2023 Philadelphia mayoral election
Party	Candidate	Votes	%	±%
Democratic	Cherelle Parker	232,075	74.72%	−5.62%
Republican	David Oh	75,677	24.36%	+4.95%
Write-in		2,849	0.92%	+0.67%
Total votes		310,601	100.0%	
Democratic hold				

Results by Ward

Ward	Cherelle Parker Democratic		David Oh Republican		Write-in		Total votes
Ward	#	%	#	%	#	%	Total votes
1	3,722	71.22%	1,370	26.22%	134	2.56%	5,226
2	6,789	78.77%	1,682	19.52%	148	1.72%	8,619
3	3,547	90.55%	345	8.81%	25	0.64%	3,917
4	3,183	92.18%	254	7.36%	16	0.46%	3,453
5	9,462	77.41%	2,627	21.49%	135	1.10%	12,224
6	2,188	90.60%	209	8.65%	18	0.75%	2,415
7	1,104	79.54%	282	20.32%	2	0.14%	1,388
8	9,940	79.03%	2,523	20.06%	115	0.91%	12,578
9	5,350	82.22%	1,081	16.61%	76	1.17%	6,507
10	5,813	93.94%	357	5.77%	18	0.29%	6,188
11	1,925	93.22%	138	6.68%	2	0.10%	2,065
12	3,819	89.54%	377	8.84%	69	1.62%	4,265
13	3,268	91.26%	290	8.10%	23	0.64%	3,581
14	1,593	88.01%	196	10.83%	21	1.16%	1,810
15	5,194	78.26%	1,358	20.46%	85	1.28%	6,637
16	1,383	92.14%	111	7.40%	7	0.47%	1,501
17	4,239	90.81%	418	8.95%	11	0.24%	4,668
18	3,923	77.90%	1,027	20.39%	86	1.71%	5,036
19	1,060	82.36%	220	17.09%	7	0.54%	1,287
20	1,352	91.41%	112	7.57%	15	1.01%	1,479
21	9,264	67.78%	4,296	31.43%	108	0.79%	13,668
22	7,422	89.44%	775	9.34%	101	1.22%	8,298
23	2,020	75.49%	643	24.03%	13	0.49%	2,676
24	2,251	88.45%	260	10.22%	34	1.34%	2,545
25	1,370	53.79%	1,148	45.07%	29	1.14%	2,547
26	2,043	39.06%	3,148	60.19%	39	0.75%	5,230
27	3,236	85.18%	437	11.50%	126	3.32%	3,799
28	1,712	93.25%	117	6.37%	7	0.38%	1,836
29	2,333	87.74%	292	10.98%	34	1.28%	2,659
30	5,048	83.99%	897	14.93%	65	1.08%	6,010
31	3,254	74.91%	1,036	23.85%	54	1.24%	4,344
32	2,568	92.47%	194	6.99%	15	0.54%	2,777
33	1,150	68.86%	514	30.78%	6	0.36%	1,670
34	7,581	88.95%	912	10.70%	30	0.35%	8,523
35	3,251	74.72%	1,092	25.10%	8	0.18%	4,351
36	6,573	86.17%	924	12.11%	131	1.72%	7,628
37	1,499	91.40%	138	8.41%	3	0.18%	1,640
38	3,654	82.76%	717	16.24%	44	1.00%	4,415
39	4,872	57.39%	3,507	41.31%	111	1.31%	8,490
40	6,114	87.14%	888	12.66%	14	0.20%	7,016
41	1,424	57.54%	1,043	42.14%	8	0.32%	2,475
42	2,345	80.36%	566	19.40%	7	0.24%	2,918
43	1,746	84.88%	309	15.02%	2	0.10%	2,057
44	2,208	91.47%	188	7.79%	18	0.75%	2,414
45	1,337	37.50%	2,216	62.16%	12	0.34%	3,565
46	5,078	87.54%	509	8.77%	214	3.69%	5,801
47	1,247	89.14%	131	9.36%	21	1.50%	1,399
48	2,778	79.67%	640	18.35%	69	1.98%	3,487
49	3,777	89.14%	445	10.50%	15	0.35%	4,237
50	7,939	93.39%	542	6.38%	20	0.24%	8,501
51	3,643	89.71%	336	8.27%	82	2.02%	4,061
52	5,665	88.32%	722	11.26%	27	0.42%	6,414
53	2,097	66.85%	1,023	32.61%	17	0.54%	3,137
54	1,172	67.78%	550	31.81%	7	0.40%	1,729
55	1,387	48.21%	1,483	51.55%	7	0.24%	2,877
56	2,935	51.02%	2,796	48.60%	22	0.38%	5,753
57	2,355	41.64%	3,288	58.14%	12	0.21%	5,655
58	3,538	38.12%	5,708	61.50%	35	0.38%	9,281
59	4,415	88.71%	480	9.64%	82	1.65%	4,977
60	3,261	88.23%	355	9.60%	80	2.16%	3,696
61	4,413	84.15%	818	15.60%	13	0.25%	5,244
62	2,083	70.92%	834	28.40%	20	0.68%	2,937
63	2,479	40.71%	3,588	58.93%	22	0.36%	6,089
64	974	39.37%	1,493	60.35%	7	0.28%	2,474
65	2,098	45.97%	2,455	53.79%	11	0.24%	4,564
66	3,612	36.51%	6,247	63.15%	34	0.34%	9,893
