= Helen Gym =

American politician (born 1968)

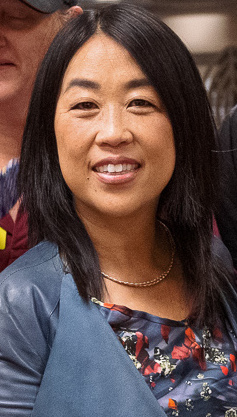

Member of the Philadelphia City Council from the at-large district
- In office January 4, 2016 – November 29, 2022
- Preceded by: Jim Kenney
- Succeeded by: Rue Landau

Personal details
- Born: January 11, 1968 (age 58) Seattle, Washington, U.S.
- Party: Democratic
- Spouse: Bret Flaherty (m. 1995)
- Children: 3
- Education: University of Pennsylvania (BA, MA)

Helen Gym (/ˈɡɪm/ GHIHM; Korean: 김혜련, born January 11, 1968) is an American politician. She was the first Asian American woman to serve on the Philadelphia City Council. She was first elected to Council in 2015 and served until 2022, when she resigned to run in the Democratic primary of the 2023 Philadelphia mayoral election. Gym finished in third place behind Cherelle Parker, who won the nomination, and Rebecca Rhynhart.

A member of the Democratic Party, Gym is a former school teacher and community organizer who cofounded Parents United for Public Education and served on the board of Asian Americans United. While on City Council, she became known as a progressive voice and focused on issues including housing, education, youth issues, and worker’s rights.

== Early life ==
Gym was born in Seattle, Washington, and raised in the suburbs of Columbus, Ohio. Her parents were born in Korea and immigrated to the United States in the 1960s. Her father was a computer engineer who worked for Nationwide Mutual Insurance Company. Her mother worked in the food services department at Ohio State University. Gym has a younger sister. When Gym was growing up, the family attended the Protestant Korean Church. Gym attended the University of Pennsylvania and majored in history. She described her time in college as a time for learning that she is "an all-or-nothing kind of person"; she was on the dean's list one semester while she was on the verge of academic expulsion in another semester. She graduated from the University of Pennsylvania in 1993.

After college, Gym returned to Ohio and worked for the Mansfield News Journal as a reporter. In 1994, she worked as a teacher at Lowell Elementary School in the Olney section of Philadelphia. During her four and a half years teaching at the school The Philadelphia Daily News ran multiple pieces revealing that the school was packing African American students into larger classes to free up resources for immigrant Asian students. The incident inspired Gym to leave the school and become an activist in order to "understand how to tackle head-on the fears and anger and needs that people desperately want to have addressed." In 1996, Gym completed her language acquisition master's degree at the University of Pennsylvania.

== Early career and activism ==
In 2000, Gym led a campaign called the "Stadium Out of Chinatown Coalition" against the construction of a baseball stadium north of Chinatown, due to the fear that it might result in gentrification of the area.

Gym has worked as a grassroots community organizer in Philadelphia and has been involved in education reform in the city since 2006. Around that time, she co-founded the Parents United for Public Education. She is a member of the editorial board of Rethinking Schools and one of the founders of The Philadelphia Public School Notebook, a nonprofit, independent, free news service. She also co-founded a charter school in Chinatown called the Folk Art Cultural Treasures School.

She has also led other campaigns. In 2008, she fought against the establishment of the proposed Foxwoods Casino planned near Philadelphia's Chinatown because of the concern that unchecked development would compel longtime residents of that area to move away. She has also organized in opposition to state-sponsored, predatory gambling.

In 2009, she worked on a successful federal civil rights case to help stop the bullying and harassment of Asian American students in South Philadelphia High School. The case came about partially due to a series of assaults at the school on December 3, 2009, when as many as thirty Asian immigrant students were attacked and beaten by large groups of African-American students. In her testimony, she called for the commission to require the school and district officials bear responsibility for not addressing the problem, to differentiate bias-based harassment and generalized violence, and take a different approach for each, and to develop effective anti-harassment policies and procedures.

In 2013, Gym helped organized a protest at A.S. Jenks School, a Philadelphia public school that was implementing split grades - a system where two different grade levels are forced to share the same classroom and teacher. The protest worked and the school ended split grades. However, Gym's opposition to proposals such as charter school expansion, concessions from teacher's unions and philanthropists influencing public-education policy has led to some adversaries describing her as an "advocate for the educational status quo."

Gym's work as an activist was profiled in 2013 by Philadelphia Magazine. She was described as having developed "a rep as perhaps Philadelphia’s preeminent public agitator", who "has managed to build herself one of the city’s largest bully pulpits." However, the piece also talked about the disdain she held towards those she perceived as foes. She has called some prominent charter school proponents "corporate raiders" and "party shills," and referred to certain journalists as members of Republican governor "Corbett PR flack machine."

In 2020, Gym made a cameo on Netflix's Queer Eye to advise a young activist featured on the show.

== Philadelphia City Council (2016–2022) ==
In November 2015, Gym was elected to the Philadelphia City Council as an at-large member. Despite not being endorsed by the Philadelphia Democratic Party, she finished in 5th place out of 16 candidates. Her campaign was supported by labor leader Johnny Dougherty and IBEW Local 98. She ran on a platform of housing reform and education. She said that she was inspired to run in order to ensure that Philadelphia's communities have an equal voice to wealthy entities and lobbyists. She proposed a fair standard of living, especially for schoolchildren, and to combat hunger, lack of housing, and poverty.

Following the aftermath of the 2017 Unite the Right rally in Charlottesville, Virginia, Gym posted on Twitter, "All around the country, we're fighting to remove the monuments to slavery & racism. Philly, we have work to do. Take the Rizzo statue down", referring to a statue of former Philadelphia mayor, Frank Rizzo. Her efforts to remove both the Frank Rizzo mural and Frank Rizzo statue began in 2016.

Gym authored Fair Workweek legislation which established regulations pertaining to scheduling of work for hourly workers. It passed the City Council in December 2018 by a 14–3 margin, with the three votes in opposition coming from the three Republican members of the City Council. It was signed into law by Mayor Jim Kenney on December 20, 2018.

Gym stood by fellow councilmember Bobby Henon, who was indicted for political corruption along with labor leader Johnny Dougherty in 2019. She supported Henon's candidacy for majority leader of the Philadelphia City Council.

During the trial of Johnny Dougherty, a convicted Philadelphia labor leader, prosecutors alleged that Dougherty bribed members of the Philadelphia City Council with tickets to Philadelphia Eagles games. In 2015, Dougherty told Bobby Henon, who has since been convicted of multiple felonies, to invite Gym, among other members, to the Eagles game. In a wiretapped call, Gym can be heard asking Henon if she should report the tickets as a gift, but Henon implied she did not have to. In 2018, after it became public that Gym received the tickets, she amended her financial interest report to include the ticket.

Gym joined Republican and moderate Democratic members of the City Council in 2019 to block a bill that would have required pharmaceutical sales representatives to register with the city and have their gifts to doctors be tracked. Philadelphia Magazine speculated that Gym's decisions could have been influenced by the fact her husband Bret Flaherty, is an attorney for AmerisourceBergen, a pharmaceutical company. She was also criticized for not recusing herself from the vote because of a conflict of interest.

Gym organized protests to oppose the closure of Hahnemann University Hospital in 2019. The Philadelphia Inquirer criticized her for grandstanding and not taking action to actually prevent the hospital's closure. Gym authored eviction protections that were adopted in 2020. Philadelphia Magazine wrote in 2023 that her legislation on this from has since become "a national model".

As a member of the City Council, Gym supported safe injection sites in Philadelphia. In 2021, she voted against cutting the Philadelphia parking tax. In 2022, Gym opposed the City Council's agreement to reduce wage and business taxes. She also opposed reducing the Business Income and Receipts tax. Gym said the tax money could have been used for the fight against violence. Gym has proposed a city-wide wealth tax, which critics contend would encourage wealthy residents to move out of the city.

In response to an increase in violence crime in 2022, Gym proposed more funding for libraries to ensure they would be open year-round for at least six days a week. Gym has argued that libraries are an investment in the youth and can be vital to combating violence. She opposed Mayor Jim Kenney's 2020 budget proposal that would increase police funding by $14 million. Gym supported the Driving Equality Bill in 2022, which prohibits police from pulling over cars for various traffic violations including broken taillights and outdated registrations.

In 2022, Gym authored legislation that was passed to address the matter of ensuring clean drinking water in Philadelphia schools.

== 2023 Philadelphia mayoral campaign ==
On November 29, 2022, Gym resigned from Council in an anticipated run for the Democratic nomination in the 2023 Philadelphia mayoral election. She officially announced her candidacy the next day. Her candidacy has been endorsed by a number of teachers unions including the American Federation of Teachers and organizations including the Working Families Party and the University of Pennsylvania Young Democratic Socialists of America. Her candidacy was also endorsed by national politicians including Senator Bernie Sanders and Congresswoman Alexandria Ocasio-Cortez.

She has proposed a number of progressive ideas including guaranteed jobs for those under the age of 30, city-funding for block parties and funerals and a city-wide therapist program. She has released a $10 billion plan for improvements to Philadelphia public schools. However, according to The Philadelphia Inquirer, Gym has not laid out a plan for how she would fund these programs and she has been non-committal on if she would change the city's tax structure.

In January 2023, Gym condemned the Union League for gifting Republican Florida Governor Ron DeSantis an award. A week later, Gym was seen at the Union League for a cocktail party. She apologized for attending the cocktail party.

During a forum in February 2023, Gym clashed with the moderator Michael Nutter, the former mayor of Philadelphia. Nutter criticized Gym for co-founding a charter school in 2005, but while on the City Council opposing the opening of new charter schools in primarily Black neighborhoods. Nutter also accused Gym of self-aggrandizing for how she talked about herself during the debate. Anna Orso writing in The Philadelphia Inquirer noted that Nutter asked tougher questions to Gym and another candidate, Jeff Brown, compared to Rebecca Rhynhart, the candidate who previously worked in his administration and he later endorsed.

In April 2023, The Philadelphia Inquirer Editorial Board ran a piece raising questions about Gym failing to provide specifics for how she would fund her proposals, among other concerns. For example, the editorial board expressed apprehension at Gym saying "I think there are significant dollars that are currently available, but we don’t have a commitment or a plan right now" when speaking on how she would fund her guaranteed jobs plan. Additionally, they questioned whether she could work with Philadelphia's business leaders, such as Comcast, which she has referred to as "trash" in the past.

== Political positions ==
Gym is considered to be a political progressive. Gym has called capitalism "an immoral system" and has said that it "runs counter to a human rights agenda and thus requires a countering force rooted in human rights and racial equity and justice."

In her 2019 City council reelection campaign, Gym gave her support to the Sunrise Movement's proposal for a "Philadelphia Green New Deal", which would be a municipal Green New Deal. Her mayoral campaign education plan includes a capital plan she has called a "Green New Deal for Schools".

Gym expressed support for the Minneapolis City Council's efforts to eliminate the Minneapolis Police Department saying cities "don’t have to keep the same systems over and over." Gym said on the looting following the murder of George Floyd: "If you want to denounce looting, let’s denounce LOOTING. Of our public schools, of Philly’s Black wealth through redlining and evictions and foreclosures, of the lives of essential workers for Amazon and Walmart getting minimum wage and no benefits while CEOs profit."

== Personal life ==
In 1995, she married Bret Flaherty, a lawyer. They have three children.

Gym was handcuffed and detained in 2021 at the Pennsylvania State Capitol while protesting alongside education advocates.

=== Awards and honors ===
- Eddy Award, 2007
- White House's "César E. Chávez Champions of Change", 2014
- The Philadelphia Inquirer's Citizen of the Year
- One of Philadelphia Magazine's 75 most influential people in the city
- Emily’s List’s 2017 Gabrielle Giffords Rising Star Award

== See also ==
- List of members of Philadelphia City Council since 1952
