= 2021 Philadelphia municipal election =

2021 Pennsylvania local election

2021 Philadelphia elections
- November 2, 2021

A general election was held in Philadelphia, Pennsylvania on November 2, 2021, to elect various county and city-level positions. The primary election was held on May 18, 2021.

== District Attorney ==
2021 Philadelphia district attorney election
- November 2, 2021
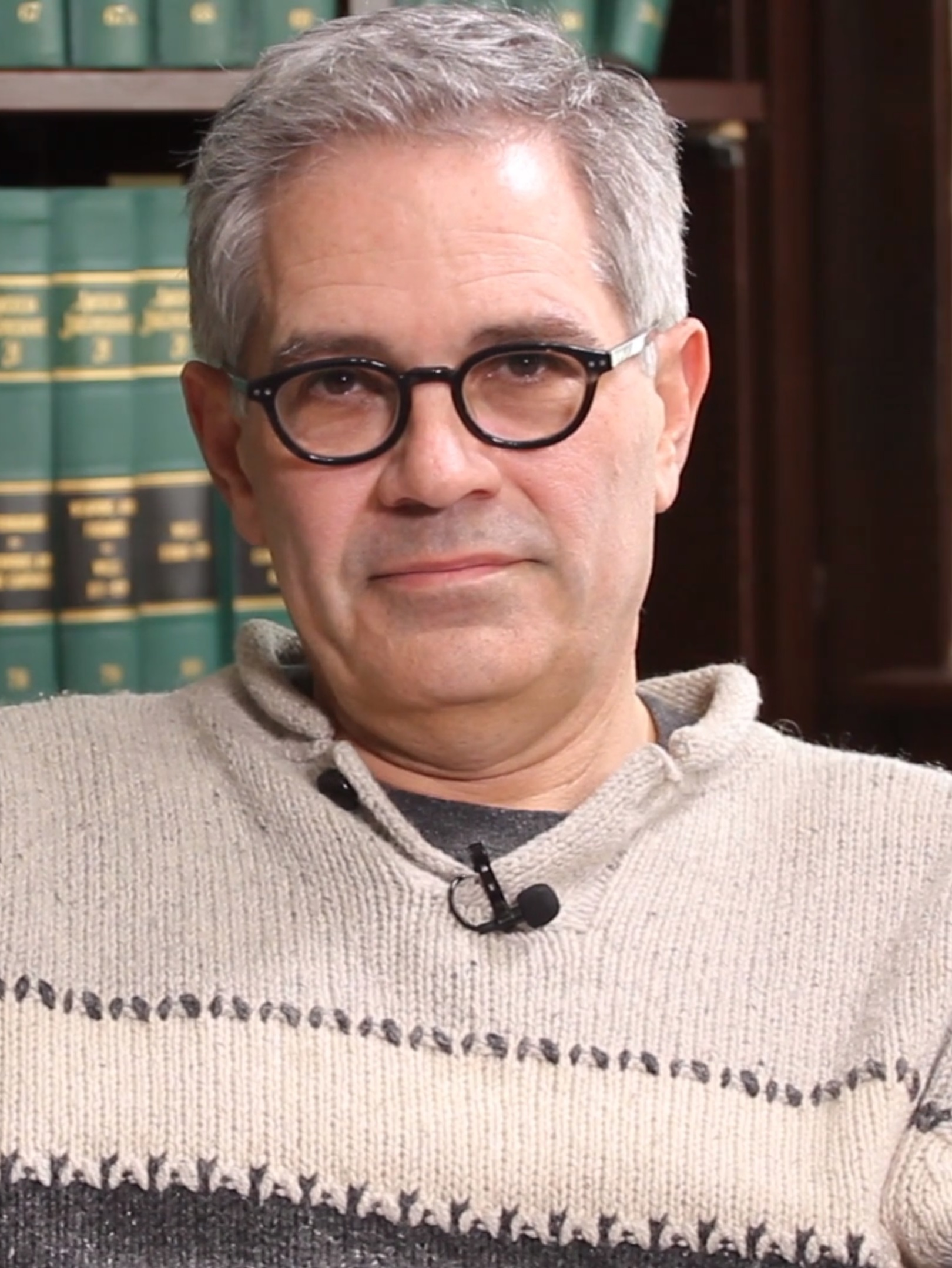

Candidate	Larry Krasner	Chuck Peruto
Party	Democratic	Republican
Popular vote	155,102	60,304
Percentage	71.81%	27.92%
- Krasner: 50–60% 60–70% 70–80% 80–90% >90% Peruto: 50–60% 60–70% 70–80% 80–90% >90% Tie: 40–50% 50%
District Attorney before election
Larry Krasner
Democratic
Elected District Attorney
Larry Krasner
Democratic

Incumbent district attorney Larry Krasner won a second term over Republican nominee Chuck Peruto, winning in a landslide.

=== Democratic primary ===
==== Nominee ====
- Larry Krasner, incumbent district attorney (2018–present)

==== Eliminated in primary ====
- Carlos Vega, homicide prosecutor

==== Results ====
Primary results by ward Krasner: 50–60%; 60–70%; 70–80%; 80–90%; 90–100%; Vega: 50–60%; 60–70%; 70–80%; 80–90%; Tie: 50%

Democratic primary results
Party	Candidate	Votes	%
Democratic	Larry Krasner (incumbent)	128,958	66.79
Democratic	Carlos Vega	63,953	33.12
Write-in		170	0.09
Total votes		193,081	100.00

=== Republican primary ===
==== Nominee ====
- Charles "Chuck" Peruto Jr., criminal defense attorney

==== Results ====
Republican primary results
Party	Candidate	Votes	%
Republican	Chuck Peruto	11,199	94.96
Write-in		595	5.04
Total votes		11,794	100.00

=== General election ===
==== Results ====
2021 Philadelphia District Attorney election
Party	Candidate	Votes	%
Democratic	Larry Krasner (incumbent)	155,102	71.81
Republican	Chuck Peruto	60,304	27.92
Write-in		570	0.26
Total votes		215,976	100.00
Democratic hold			

== City Controller ==
2021 Philadelphia city controller election
- November 2, 2021
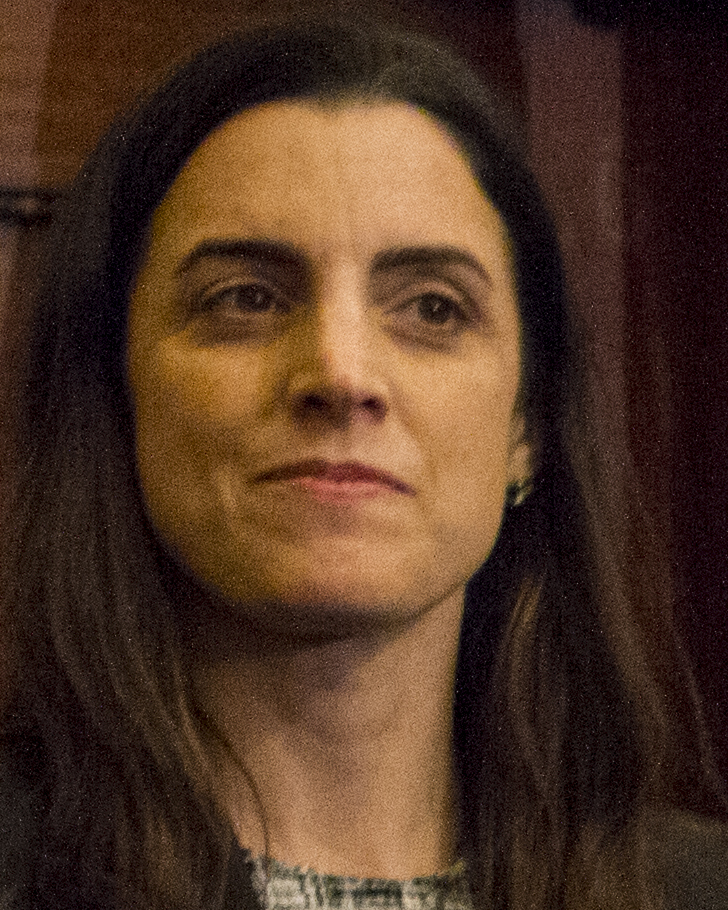
Candidate	Rebecca Rhynhart
Party	Democratic
Popular vote	168,847
Percentage	99.55%
City Controller before election
Rebecca Rhynhart
Democratic
Elected City Controller
Rebecca Rhynhart
Democratic

Incumbent city controller Rebecca Rhynhart ran unopposed in the general election, winning a second term.

=== Democratic primary ===
==== Nominee ====
- Rebecca Rhynhart, incumbent city controller (2018–present)

==== Results ====
Democratic primary results
Party	Candidate	Votes	%
Democratic	Rebecca Rhynhart (incumbent)	140,245	99.68
Write-in		454	0.32
Total votes		140,699	100.00

=== Republican primary ===
==== Results ====
Republican primary results
Party	Candidate	Votes	%
	Write-in	220	100.00
Total votes		220	100.00

=== General election ===
==== Results ====
2021 Philadelphia City Controller election
Party	Candidate	Votes	%
Democratic	Rebecca Rhynhart (incumbent)	168,847	99.55
Write-in		762	0.45
Total votes		169,609	100.00
Democratic hold			

== Court of Common Pleas partisan election ==
Incumbent Judges Gary S. Glazer, James Murray Lynn, Arnold L. New, and Robert J. Rebstock filed to run for retention but later withdrew, resulting in eight seats up in the primary election and twelve seats up in the general election.

=== Democratic primary ===
==== Results ====
2021 Philadelphia Court of Common Pleas Democratic primary (vote for up to 8)
Party	Candidate	Votes	%
Democratic	Nick Kamau	103,129	9.54
Democratic	Wendi Barish	100,441	9.29
Democratic	Cateria R. McCabe	97,570	9.03
Democratic	Betsy Wahl	88,302	8.17
Democratic	Chris Hall	86,610	8.01
Democratic	Michele Hangley	76,359	7.06
Democratic	Craig Levin	74,215	6.87
Democratic	Daniel R. Sulman	73,017	6.76
Democratic	Caroline Turner	72,066	6.67
Democratic	Mark J. Moore	63,510	5.88
Democratic	Tamika Washington	63,090	5.84
Democratic	Terri Booker	52,270	4.84
Democratic	John R. Padova	50,506	4.67
Democratic	Maurice Houston	29,864	2.76
Democratic	Rick Cataldi	24,632	2.28
Democratic	Patrick J. Moran	24,305	2.25
Write-in		991	0.09
Total votes		1,080,877	100.00

=== Republican primary ===
==== Results ====
2021 Philadelphia Court of Common Pleas Republican primary (vote for up to 12)
Party	Candidate	Votes	%
	Write-in	1,067	100.00
Total votes		1,067	100.00

=== General election ===
==== Results ====
2021 Philadelphia Court of Common Pleas election (vote for up to 12)
Party	Candidate	Votes	%
Democratic	Wendi Barish	154,312	8.86
Democratic	Nick Kamau	153,790	8.83
Democratic	Michele Hangley	151,677	8.71
Democratic	Chris Hall	150,829	8.66
Democratic	Cateria R. McCabe	150,727	8.65
Democratic	Betsy Wahl	149,577	8.59
Democratic	Mark J. Moore	142,964	8.21
Democratic	Daniel R. Sulman	142,625	8.19
Democratic	Craig Levin	141,424	8.12
Democratic	Monica N. Gibbs	139,573	8.01
Democratic	John Sabatina	132,348	7.60
Democratic	Leanne L. Litwin	127,834	7.34
Write-in		3,877	0.22
Total votes		1,741,557	100.00

== Court of Common Pleas retention elections ==
=== Results ===
Justice Diana Anhalt retention, 2021
Choice	Votes	%
For	114,301	78.69
Against	30,947	21.31
Total	145,248	100.00
Source: Philadelphia City Commissioners

Justice Denis P. Cohen retention, 2021
Choice	Votes	%
For	105,058	74.40
Against	36,140	25.60
Total	141,198	100.00
Source: Philadelphia City Commissioners

Justice Rose Marie Defino-Nastasi retention, 2021
Choice	Votes	%
For	111,762	77.45
Against	32,548	22.55
Total	144,310	100.00
Source: Philadelphia City Commissioners

Justice Charles Ehrlich retention, 2021
Choice	Votes	%
For	104,000	74.60
Against	35,406	25.40
Total	139,406	100.00
Source: Philadelphia City Commissioners

Justice Angelo J. Foglietta retention, 2021
Choice	Votes	%
For	107,258	75.54
Against	34,730	24.46
Total	141,988	100.00
Source: Philadelphia City Commissioners

Justice Jonathan Q. Irvine retention, 2021
Choice	Votes	%
For	102,442	74.92
Against	34,296	25.08
Total	136,738	100.00
Source: Philadelphia City Commissioners

Justice Elizabeth Jackson retention, 2021
Choice	Votes	%
For	110,627	78.30
Against	30,659	21.70
Total	141,286	100.00
Source: Philadelphia City Commissioners

Justice Vincent L. Johnson retention, 2021
Choice	Votes	%
For	105,760	76.47
Against	32,541	23.53
Total	138,301	100.00
Source: Philadelphia City Commissioners

Justice Sean F. Kennedy retention, 2021
Choice	Votes	%
For	106,204	76.79
Against	32,097	23.21
Total	138,301	100.00
Source: Philadelphia City Commissioners

Justice Barbara A. McDermott retention, 2021
Choice	Votes	%
For	111,456	78.65
Against	30,258	21.35
Total	141,714	100.00
Source: Philadelphia City Commissioners

Justice Margaret T. Murphy retention, 2021
Choice	Votes	%
For	110,915	78.22
Against	30,885	21.78
Total	141,800	100.00
Source: Philadelphia City Commissioners

Justice George W. Overton retention, 2021
Choice	Votes	%
For	103,336	75.15
Against	34,176	24.85
Total	137,512	100.00
Source: Philadelphia City Commissioners

Justice Edward C. Wright retention, 2021
Choice	Votes	%
For	104,614	76.30
Against	32,489	23.70
Total	137,103	100.00
Source: Philadelphia City Commissioners

== Philadelphia Municipal Court partisan election ==
Incumbent Judges Gerard A. Kosinski and Marsha H. Niefield filed to run for retention but later withdrew, resulting in three seats up in the primary election and five seats up in the general election.

=== Democratic primary ===
==== Results ====
2021 Philadelphia Municipal Court Democratic primary (vote for up to 3)
Party	Candidate	Votes	%
Democratic	Greg Yorgey-Girdy	95,468	27.82
Democratic	Michael C. Lambert	92,500	26.95
Democratic	George Twardy	82,529	24.05
Democratic	Barbara Thomson	71,870	20.94
Write-in		805	0.23
Total votes		343,172	100.00

=== Republican primary ===
==== Results ====
2021 Philadelphia Municipal Court Republican primary
Party	Candidate	Votes	%
	Write-in	449	100.00
Total votes		449	100.00

=== General election ===
==== Results ====
2021 Philadelphia Municipal Court election (vote for up to 5)
Party	Candidate	Votes	%
Democratic	Greg Yorgey-Girdy	146,913	20.99
Democratic	Fran McCloskey	140,486	20.07
Democratic	Michael C. Lambert	139,656	19.95
Democratic	George Twardy	139,044	19.86
Democratic	Christian A. DiCicco	132,537	18.93
Write-in		1,412	0.20
Total votes		700,048	100.00

== Philadelphia Municipal Court retention elections ==
=== Results ===
Justice Frank T. Brady retention, 2021
Choice	Votes	%
For	105,731	75.10
Against	35,052	24.90
Total	140,783	100.00
Source: Philadelphia City Commissioners

Justice Patrick Dugan retention, 2021
Choice	Votes	%
For	104,098	75.17
Against	34,390	24.83
Total	138,488	100.00
Source: Philadelphia City Commissioners

Justice Charles Hayden retention, 2021
Choice	Votes	%
For	102,101	74.91
Against	34,193	25.09
Total	136,294	100.00
Source: Philadelphia City Commissioners

Justice Christine M. Hope retention, 2021
Choice	Votes	%
For	109,191	78.76
Against	29,451	21.24
Total	138,642	100.00
Source: Philadelphia City Commissioners

Justice Sharon Williams Losier retention, 2021
Choice	Votes	%
For	105,903	76.17
Against	33,123	23.83
Total	139,026	100.00
Source: Philadelphia City Commissioners

Justice Joffie C. Pittman III retention, 2021
Choice	Votes	%
For	101,717	75.35
Against	33,269	24.65
Total	134,986	100.00
Source: Philadelphia City Commissioners

Justice Craig M. Washington retention, 2021
Choice	Votes	%
For	104,676	76.56
Against	32,048	23.44
Total	136,724	100.00
Source: Philadelphia City Commissioners

== Ballot questions ==
One ballot question appeared on the primary ballot and four questions appeared on the general ballot. All proposed questions passed.

=== Primary election ===
Proposal 1 results by ward Yes: 60%–70%; 70%–80%; 80%–90%

Proposed Charter Change 1: Expand the Board of License Inspection Review
Choice	Votes	%
For	155,032	78.74
Against	41,860	21.26
Total	196,892	100.00
Source: Philadelphia City Commissioners

=== General election ===
Proposal 1 results by ward Yes: 50%–60%; 60%–70%; 70%–80%; 80%–90%

Proposed Charter Change 1: Call on State Legislature and Governor to Decriminalize Marijuana
Choice	Votes	%
For	156,578	73.93
Against	55,222	26.07
Total	211,800	100.00
Source: Philadelphia City Commissioners

Proposal 2 results by ward Yes: 50%–60%; 60%–70%; 70%–80%; 80%–90%

Proposed Charter Change 2: Create the Department of Fleet Services
Choice	Votes	%
For	152,286	73.91
Against	53,758	26.09
Total	206,044	100.00
Source: Philadelphia City Commissioners

Proposal 3 results by ward Yes: 50%–60%; 60%–70%; 70%–80%; 80%–90%; No: 50%–60%; 60%–70%

Proposed Charter Change 3: Change Civil Service System Hiring and Promoting Practices
Choice	Votes	%
For	130,857	63.94
Against	73,795	36.06
Total	204,652	100.00
Source: Philadelphia City Commissioners

Proposal 4 results by ward Yes: 50%–60%; 60%–70%; 70%–80%; 80%–90%; No: 50%–60%; 60%–70%

Proposed Charter Change 4: Require Annual Appropriation to the Housing Trust Fund
Choice	Votes	%
For	144,759	70.44
Against	60,737	29.56
Total	205,496	100.00
Source: Philadelphia City Commissioners
