= 2015 Philadelphia City Council election =

- November 3, 2015

All 17 seats on the Philadelphia City Council 9 seats needed for a majority
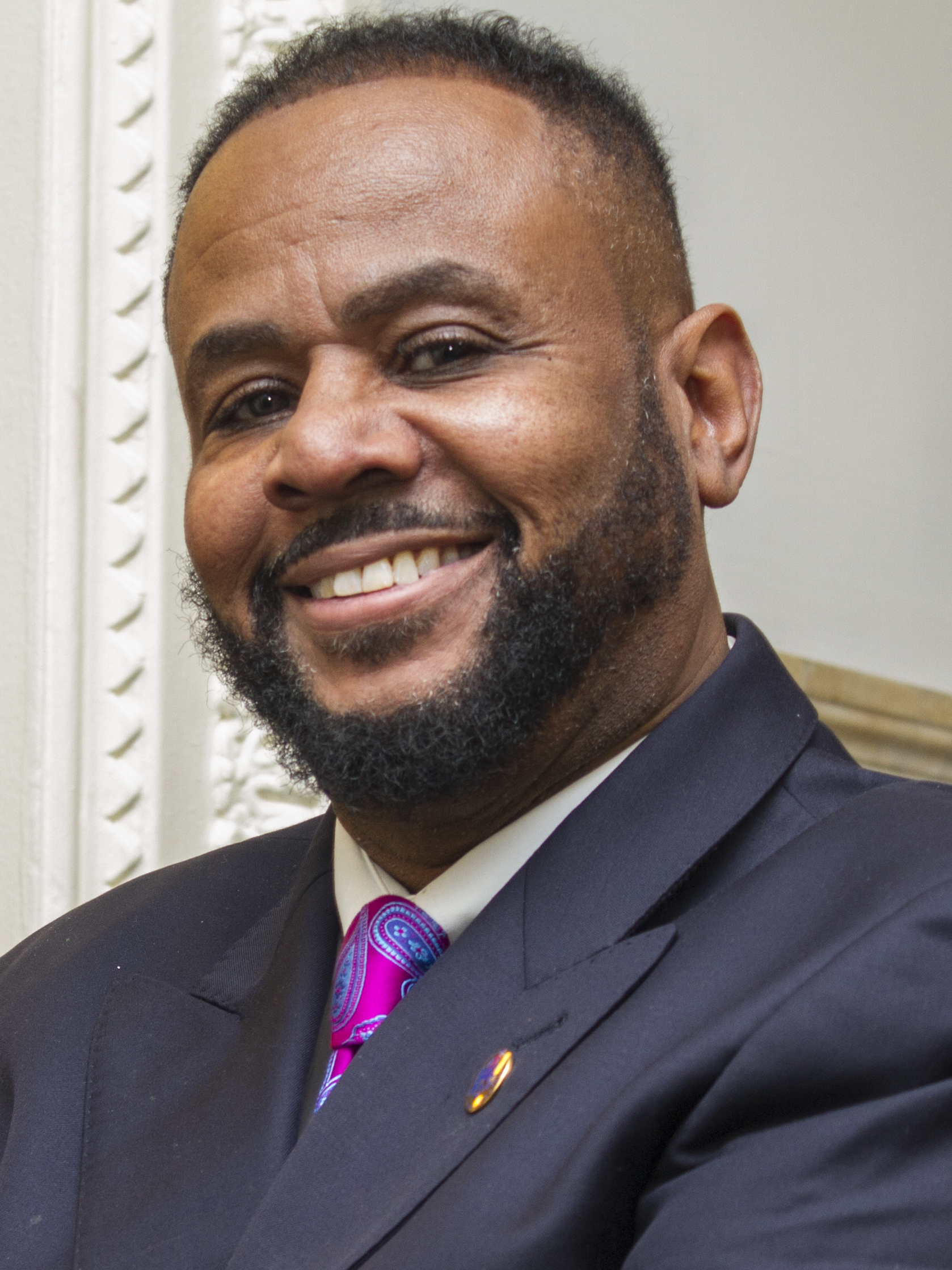

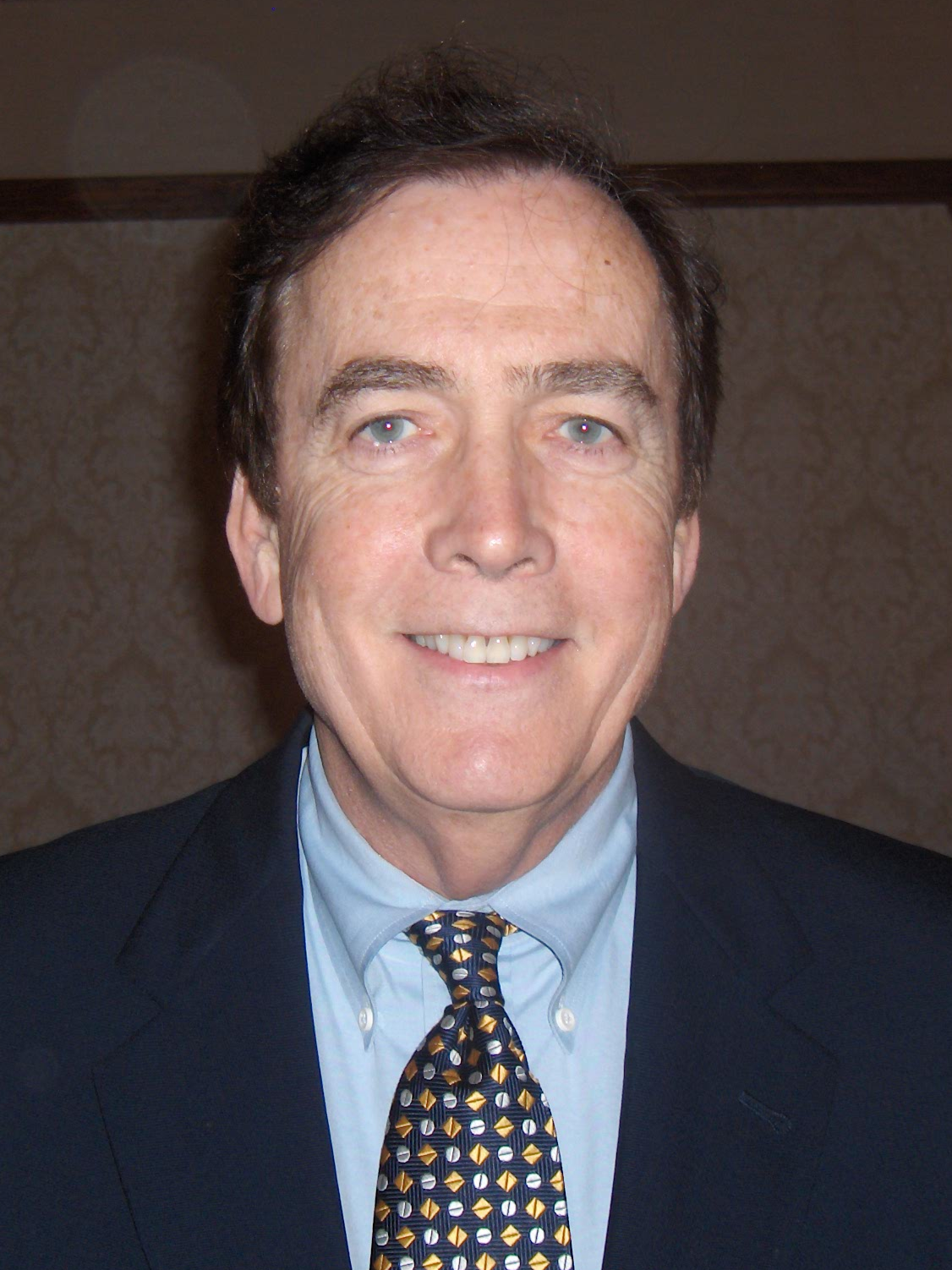
	First party	Second party
Leader	Curtis Jones Jr.	Brian J. O'Neill
Party	Democratic	Republican
Leader's seat	District 4	District 10
Last election	14 seats	3 seats
Seats before	14	3
Seats won	14	3
Seat change	Steady	Steady
Council President before election
Darrell L. Clarke
Democratic
Elected Council President
Darrell L. Clarke
Democratic

The 2015 Philadelphia City Council election took place on November 3, 2015, along with the 2015 Philadelphia mayoral election. The composition of the Philadelphia City Council remained unchanged from before the election, with Democrats maintaining their 14-3 majority on the council.

== 1st District ==
=== Democratic primary ===
==== Nominee ====
- Mark Squilla, incumbent councilmember (2012–present)

==== Results ====
District 1, 2015 Democratic primary
Party	Candidate	Votes	%
Democratic	Mark Squilla (incumbent)	16,013	99.84
Write-in		25	0.16
Total votes		16,038	100.00

=== Republican primary ===
==== Results ====
District 1, 2015 Republican primary
Party	Candidate	Votes	%
	Write-in	6	100.00
Total votes		6	100.00

=== General election ===
==== Results ====
District 1, 2015 general election
Party	Candidate	Votes	%
Democratic	Mark Squilla (incumbent)	21,740	99.78
Write-in		47	0.22
Total votes		21,787	100.00
Democratic hold			

== 2nd District ==
=== Democratic primary ===
==== Nominee ====
- Kenyatta Johnson, incumbent councilmember (2012–present)

==== Eliminated in primary ====
- Ori Feibush, real estate agent and businessman

==== Results ====
Results by precinct Johnson: 50%–60%; 60%–70%; 70%–80%; 80%–90%; 90%–100%; Feibush: 50%–60%; 60%–70%; 70%–80%; 80%–90%

District 2, 2015 Democratic primary
Party	Candidate	Votes	%
Democratic	Kenyatta Johnson (incumbent)	14,993	62.14
Democratic	Ori Feibush	9,123	37.81
Write-in		12	0.05
Total votes		24,128	100.00

=== Republican primary ===
==== Results ====
District 2, 2015 Republican primary
Party	Candidate	Votes	%
	Write-in	12	100.00
Total votes		12	100.00

=== General election ===
==== Results ====
District 2, 2015 general election
Party	Candidate	Votes	%
Democratic	Kenyatta Johnson (incumbent)	19,322	99.70
Write-in		59	0.30
Total votes		19,381	100.00
Democratic hold			

== 3rd District ==
=== Democratic primary ===
==== Nominee ====
- Jannie Blackwell, incumbent councilmember (1992–present)

==== Results ====
District 3, 2015 Democratic primary
Party	Candidate	Votes	%
Democratic	Jannie Blackwell (incumbent)	15,883	99.33
Write-in		107	0.67
Total votes		15,990	100.00

=== Republican primary ===
==== Results ====
District 3, 2015 Republican primary
Party	Candidate	Votes	%
	Write-in	7	100.00
Total votes		7	100.00

=== General election ===
==== Results ====
District 3, 2015 general election
Party	Candidate	Votes	%
Democratic	Jannie Blackwell (incumbent)	19,322	99.70
Write-in		59	0.30
Total votes		19,381	100.00
Democratic hold			

== 4th District ==
=== Democratic primary ===
==== Nominee ====
- Curtis Jones Jr., incumbent councilmember (2008–present)

==== Results ====
District 4, 2015 Democratic primary
Party	Candidate	Votes	%
Democratic	Curtis Jones Jr. (incumbent)	19,160	99.93
Write-in		13	0.07
Total votes		19,173	100.00

=== Republican primary ===
==== Results ====
District 4, 2015 Republican primary
Party	Candidate	Votes	%
	Write-in	5	100.00
Total votes		5	100.00

=== General election ===
==== Results ====
District 4, 2015 general election
Party	Candidate	Votes	%
Democratic	Curtis Jones Jr. (incumbent)	22,957	99.87
Write-in		31	0.13
Total votes		22,988	100.00
Democratic hold			

== 5th District ==
=== Democratic primary ===
==== Nominee ====
- Darrell L. Clarke, incumbent councilmember (1999–present)

==== Results ====
District 5, 2015 Democratic primary
Party	Candidate	Votes	%
Democratic	Darrell L. Clarke (incumbent)	15,960	99.84
Write-in		25	0.16
Total votes		15,985	100.00

=== Republican primary ===
==== Results ====
District 5, 2015 Republican primary
Party	Candidate	Votes	%
	Write-in	5	100.00
Total votes		5	100.00

=== General election ===
==== Results ====
District 5, 2015 general election
Party	Candidate	Votes	%
Democratic	Darrell L. Clarke (incumbent)	20,418	99.84
Write-in		32	0.16
Total votes		20,450	100.00
Democratic hold			

== 6th District ==
=== Democratic primary ===
==== Nominee ====
- Bobby Henon, incumbent councilmember (2012–present)

==== Results ====
District 6, 2015 Democratic primary
Party	Candidate	Votes	%
Democratic	Bobby Henon (incumbent)	11,016	99.97
Write-in		3	0.03
Total votes		11,019	100.00

=== Republican primary ===
==== Results ====
District 6, 2015 Republican primary
Party	Candidate	Votes	%
	Write-in	7	100.00
Total votes		7	100.00

=== General election ===
==== Results ====
District 6, 2015 general election
Party	Candidate	Votes	%
Democratic	Bobby Henon (incumbent)	14,671	99.86
Write-in		21	0.14
Total votes		14,692	100.00
Democratic hold			

== 7th District ==
=== Democratic primary ===
==== Nominee ====
- Maria Quiñones-Sánchez, incumbent councilmember (2008–present)

==== Eliminated in primary ====
- Manny Morales, 62nd Ward Democratic committeeman

==== Results ====
Results by precinct Quiñones-Sánchez: 50%–60%; 60%–70%; 70%–80%; 80%–90%; Morales: 50%–60%; 60%–70%; 70%–80%; 80%–90%; Tie: 50%

District 7, 2015 Democratic primary
Party	Candidate	Votes	%
Democratic	Maria Quiñones-Sánchez (incumbent)	6,557	53.54
Democratic	Manny Morales	5,689	46.46
Write-in		0	0.00
Total votes		12,246	100.00

=== Republican primary ===
==== Results ====
District 7, 2015 Republican primary
Party	Candidate	Votes	%
	Write-in	5	100.00
Total votes		5	100.00

=== General election ===
==== Results ====
District 7, 2015 general election
Party	Candidate	Votes	%
Democratic	Maria Quiñones-Sánchez (incumbent)	9,737	99.89
Write-in		11	0.11
Total votes		9,748	100.00
Democratic hold			

== 8th District ==
=== Democratic primary ===
==== Nominee ====
- Cindy Bass, incumbent councilmember (2012–present)

==== Results ====
District 8, 2015 Democratic primary
Party	Candidate	Votes	%
Democratic	Cindy Bass (incumbent)	22,510	99.93
Write-in		16	0.07
Total votes		22,526	100.00

=== Republican primary ===
==== Results ====
District 8, 2015 Republican primary
Party	Candidate	Votes	%
	Write-in	8	100.00
Total votes		8	100.00

=== General election ===
==== Results ====
District 8, 2015 general election
Party	Candidate	Votes	%
Democratic	Cindy Bass (incumbent)	26,358	96.88
Independent	Michael Galganski	840	3.09
Write-in		8	0.03
Total votes		27,206	100.00
Democratic hold			

== 9th District ==
2015 Philadelphia City Council 9th district election
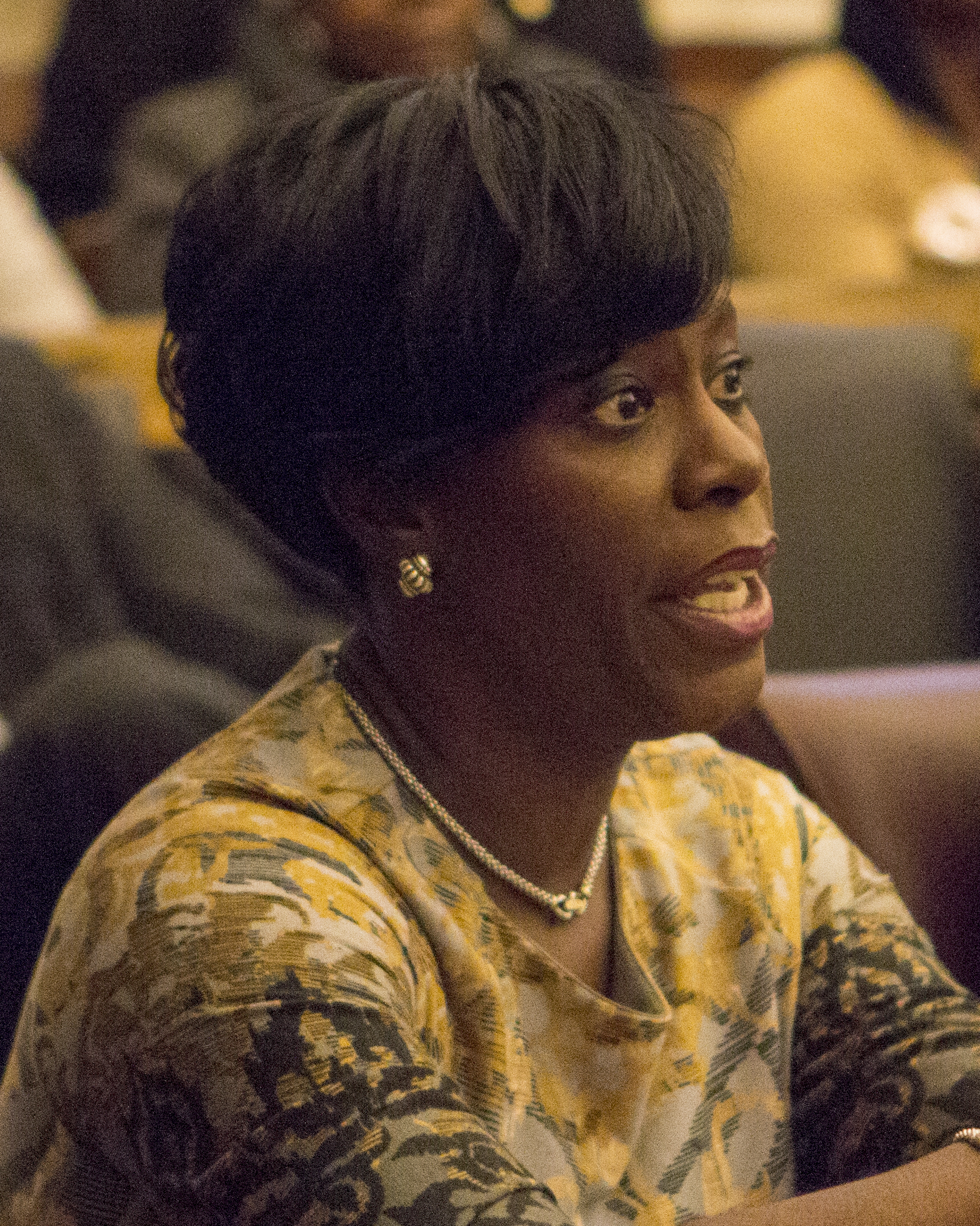

Candidate	Cherelle Parker	Kevin Strickland
Party	Democratic	Republican
Popular vote	21,565	1,920
Percentage	91.11%	8.11%
- Results by precinct Parker: 50–60% 60–70% 70–80% 80–90% >90% Strickland: 50–60%
Councilmember before election
Marian B. Tasco
Democratic
Elected Councilmember
Cherelle Parker
Democratic

=== Democratic primary ===
==== Nominee ====
- Cherelle Parker, member of the Pennsylvania House of Representatives for the 200th district (2006–present)

==== Results ====
District 9, 2015 Democratic primary
Party	Candidate	Votes	%
Democratic	Cherelle Parker	20,041	99.97
Write-in		7	0.03
Total votes		20,048	100.00

=== Republican primary ===
==== Nominee ====
- Kevin Strickland

==== Results ====
District 9, 2015 Republican primary
Party	Candidate	Votes	%
Republican	Kevin Strickland	581	99.66
Write-in		2	0.34
Total votes		583	100.00

=== General election ===
==== Results ====
District 9, 2015 general election
Party	Candidate	Votes	%
Democratic	Cherelle Parker	21,565	91.11
Republican	Kevin Strickland	1,920	8.11
Independent	Bobbie T. Curry	182	0.76
Write-in		1	0.00
Total votes		23,668	100.00
Democratic hold			

== 10th District ==
=== Democratic primary ===
==== Results ====
District 10, 2015 Democratic primary
Party	Candidate	Votes	%
	Write-in	55	100.00
Total votes		55	100.00

=== Republican primary ===
==== Nominee ====
- Brian J. O'Neill, incumbent councilmember (1980–present)

==== Results ====
District 10, 2015 Republican primary
Party	Candidate	Votes	%
Republican	Brian J. O'Neill (incumbent)	4,070	99.95
Write-in		2	0.05
Total votes		4,072	100.00

=== General election ===
==== Results ====
District 10, 2015 general election
Party	Candidate	Votes	%
Republican	Brian J. O'Neill (incumbent)	14,565	99.88
Write-in		17	0.11
Total votes		14,582	100.00
Republican hold			

== At-Large Seats ==
=== Democratic primary ===
==== Results ====
Philadelphia City Council At-Large, 2015 Democratic primary Vote for 5
Party	Candidate	Votes	%
Democratic	Derek S. Green	68,505	10.64
Democratic	Blondell Reynolds Brown (incumbent)	62,922	9.77
Democratic	Allan Domb	57,691	8.96
Democratic	William K. Greenlee (incumbent)	50,849	7.90
Democratic	Helen Gym	49,270	7.65
Democratic	Isaiah Thomas	48,000	7.45
Democratic	W. Wilson Goode Jr.	46,555	7.23
Democratic	Sherrie Cohen	45,847	7.12
Democratic	Ed Neilson	40,786	6.33
Democratic	Paul Steinke	37,104	5.76
Democratic	Jenne Ayers	32,637	5.07
Democratic	Thomas Wyatt	30,310	4.71
Democratic	Frank Rizzo Jr.	26,260	4.08
Democratic	Wilson Alexander	19,210	2.98
Democratic	Carla M. Cain	17,115	2.66
Democratic	Marnie Aument Loughrey	10,890	1.69
Write-in		87	0.01
Total votes		644,038	100.00

=== Republican primary ===
==== Results ====
Philadelphia City Council At-Large, 2015 Republican primary Vote for 5
Party	Candidate	Votes	%
Republican	David Oh (incumbent)	8,960	18.02
Republican	Dennis M. O'Brien (incumbent)	8,038	16.16
Republican	Terry Tracy	7,801	15.69
Republican	Daniel Tinney	7,528	15.14
Republican	Al Taubenberger	6,587	13.25
Republican	Matt Wolfe	5,800	11.66
Republican	James Williams	4,979	10.01
Write-in		32	0.06
Total votes		49,725	100.00

=== General election ===
==== Results ====
Philadelphia City Council Member At-Large, 2015 general election Vote for 5
Party	Candidate	Votes	%
Democratic	Helen Gym	145,087	15.91
Democratic	Derek S. Green	144,337	15.83
Democratic	Allan Domb	143,265	15.71
Democratic	Blondell Reynolds Brown (incumbent)	141,368	15.50
Democratic	William K. Greenlee (incumbent)	137,315	15.06
Republican	David Oh (incumbent)	34,877	3.82
Republican	Al Taubenberger	34,711	3.81
Republican	Dennis M. O'Brien (incumbent)	34,324	3.76
Republican	Daniel Tinney	31,863	3.49
Republican	Terry Tracy	28,050	3.08
Independent	Andrew Stober	16,301	1.79
Green	Kristin Combs	11,366	1.25
Independent	Sheila Armstrong	5,466	0.60
Socialist Workers	John Staggs	3,480	0.38
Write-in		105	0.01
Total votes		911,915	100.00
Democratic hold			
Democratic hold			
Democratic hold			
Democratic hold			
Democratic hold			
Republican hold			
Republican hold			
