= Sharon Vaughn (politician) =

American politician

Member of the Philadelphia City Council from the at-large district
- In office November 28, 2022 – December 31, 2023
- Preceded by: Derek S. Green
- Succeeded by: Nina Ahmad

Personal details
- Born: 1964 (age 61–62) North Philadelphia, Pennsylvania, U.S.
- Party: Democratic
- Spouse: Kevin Vaughn

Sharon Vaughn is an American politician elected in 2022 to serve the final 13 months of Derek S. Green's term as an at-large representative on the Philadelphia City Council. She did not run for reelection in 2023.

== Formative years and family ==
Vaughn was born and raised in North Philadelphia, Pennsylvania in 1964. A 1982 graduate of the J. W. Hallahan Catholic Girls High School in 1982, she was awarded her associate degree in business administration and management from Bradford University in 1983.

She and her husband, Kevin Vaughn, are longtime residents of Philadelphia's Feltonville neighborhood. They are the parents of two children and have two grandchildren.

== Career ==
Prior to entering public service, Vaughn was employed by PSFS and then the University of Pennsylvania’s Veterinary School.

Vaughn was a member of Marian B. Tasco's staff before becoming chief of staff for Derek S. Green. When Green resigned to run for mayor, Vaughn was unanimously picked by city ward leaders to replace him in the special election. She defeated Republican Jim Hasher in the general election on November 8, 2022, to represent all of Philadelphia as one of the seven at-large members on the council. As promised, she did not run for re-election.

She is also the leader of the Democratic City Committee's 42nd ward, and was elected its first chair in 2026.

== Civic leadership and community service ==
Vaughn has been active with multiple civic and community service organizations, including as:

- Democratic Leader, 42nd Ward (2017–present);
- Executive Board member, Democratic State Committee;
- Member of the board of directors, Greater Philadelphia Asian Social Service Center (GPASS); and
- Member of the board of directors, Project to End Homelessness (now Project HOME).
