= 2025 District Council 33 strike =

2025 union action by municipal workers in Philadelphia

On June 30, 2025, the American Federation of State, County, and Municipal Employees (AFSCME) District Council 33 (DC 33) labor union in Philadelphia, Pennsylvania, declared a strike. As a result, many essential city services, such as trash collection and city pool and library branch operations, were either reduced or halted. Residents were given the option to dispose of trash at dumpsters in city parks and at recreation centers. Some employees, such as emergency 911 dispatchers, were also included in the strike but forced to return to work by injunction.

District Council 33 had requested an 8% pay raise each year for four years, while Mayor Cherelle Parker countered with a 13% total increase over four years. Negotiations continued into July.

On July 9, 2025, Parker and DC 33 President Greg Boulware announced that the strike was over, and the union had accepted a 3% raise for each year into 2027, including the 5% raise members received in 2024, for a total of 14% over four years.

== Strike pushback ==
DC 33 argued that Parker gave herself a 9% pay raise upon entering office in January 2024, which Parker denied.

The annual Fourth of July Wawa Welcome America concert often features notable musical figures. For 2025, both rapper LL Cool J and R&B singer/Philadelphia native Jazmine Sullivan were slated to perform in the lineup. Both artists withdrew as a result of the strike.
