= Isaac Abella =

20th and 21st century professor of Physics

- Born: June 20, 1934; Toronto, Ontario, Canada
- Died: October 23, 2016 (aged 82); Chicago, Illinois, U.S.
- Education: University of Toronto (BA); Columbia University (MA, PhD)
- Known for: Laser coherent transients
- Scientific career
- Fields: Physics
- Workplaces: University of Chicago
- Thesis: Some properties of ruby optical masers with applications to non-linear effects (1963)
- Doctoral advisor: Charles H. Townes

Isaac David Abella (June 20, 1934 – October 23, 2016) was a Canadian-American physicist, cousin of Irving Abella, and a professor at the University of Chicago. He specialized in laser physics, quantum optics, and spectroscopy.

== Early life and education ==
Isaac Abella was born on June 20, 1934, in Toronto, Ontario, Canada. He received his Bachelor of Arts degree in physics and astronomy (1957) from the University of Toronto, Master of Arts (1959) degree, and Ph.D. (1963) in Physics from Columbia University in New York and studied under Charles H. Townes. Abella was involved in early research of laser development. Notably, his thesis under Townes was among the earliest works on two-photon absorption.

== Career ==
Abella was known for his work with laser coherent transients, employing photon echo techniques to probe metastable excited states in rare gas mixtures such as helium, neon, and argon. These states were produced in a weakly ionized RF plasma discharge. Nitrogen-pumped dye lasers were then used to generate the coherent superposition states.

In 1969, he received the Quantrell Award for Excellence in Undergraduate Teaching from the University of Chicago.

Abella was also known for his work in spectroscopy of rare-earth laser materials. Specifically, samples of YLF and YAG crystals doped with erbium, thulium, and holmium studied using selective laser excitation in the region of 780 nm, the erbium bands. He studied the energy transfer process: Er to Tm, to Ho, which concentrates energy emission at 2.085 μm at room temperature and in liquid nitrogen, a process that is a radiationless, near-resonant transfer of energy between sites that depends on the relative concentrations of the rare-earth ions. Accordingly, his experimental interests included measuring decay rates, excited state absorption, branching ratios and detailed theories of these processes.

== Personal life and death ==
Isaac Abella died on October 23, 2016, in Chicago, Illinois, at the age of 82. He was married to Mary Ann Abella, Professor of Art, Chicago State University. He had two children: a son, Benjamin, and daughter, Sarah.

== Articles ==
- ABELLA, I. D.; TOWNES, C. H. (1961). "Mode Characteristics and Coherence in Optical Ruby Masers". Nature. 192 (4806). Springer Science and Business Media LLC: 957–959. Bibcode:1961Natur.192..957A. doi:10.1038/192957b0. ISSN 0028-0836. S2CID 4283726.
- Kurnit, N. A.; Abella, I. D.; Hartmann, S. R. (1964-11-09). "Observation of a Photon Echo". Physical Review Letters. 13 (19). American Physical Society (APS): 567–568. Bibcode:1964PhRvL..13..567K. doi:10.1103/physrevlett.13.567. ISSN 0031-9007.
- Abella, I. D.; Kurnit, N. A.; Hartmann, S. R. (1966-01-07). "Photon Echoes". Physical Review. 141 (1). American Physical Society (APS): 391–406. Bibcode:1966PhRv..141..391A. doi:10.1103/physrev.141.391. ISSN 0031-899X.
- A. E, Siegman, Lasers, University Science Press, Sausalito CA, 1986
- Charles Townes. "How the Laser Happened", Oxford University Press, 1999
- J. Hecht, "The Race to Make the First Laser", Oxford University Press, 2005
