= Benjamin Abella =

American physician

Benjamin S. Abella
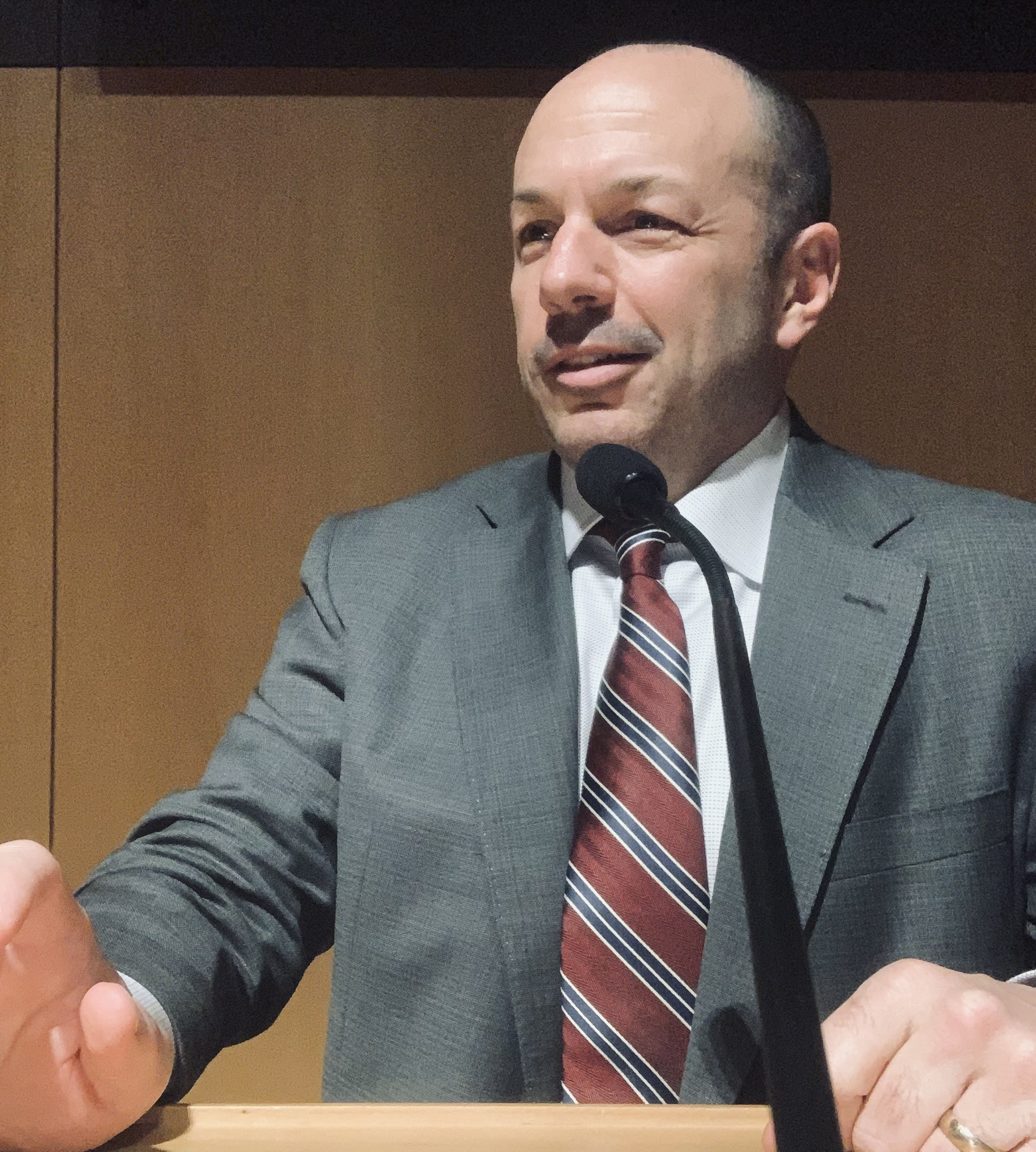
- Abella in 2024
- Born: Chicago, Illinois
- Occupations: Physician, emergency medicine practitioner and academic

Academic background
- Education: B.A., Biochemistry; M.Phil., Genetics; M.D.
- Alma mater: Washington University in St. Louis; Cambridge University; Johns Hopkins School of Medicine

Academic work
- Institutions: University of Pennsylvania Icahn School of Medicine at Mount Sinai

Benjamin S. Abella is an American physician, emergency medicine practitioner, internist, academic and researcher. He is the system chair of Emergency Medicine at the Mount Sinai Health System in New York City. Previously, he was the William G. Baxt Professor and Vice Chair of Research at University of Pennsylvania's Department of Emergency Medicine and director of the Center for Resuscitation Science and the Penn Acute Research Collaboration at the University. He has participated in developing international CPR guidelines.

Abella has published over 200 scholarly papers regarding cardiac arrest, myocardial perfusion, therapeutic hypothermia, CPR delivery and resuscitation. He is a fellow of the American Heart Association and the European Resuscitation Council.

== Early life and education ==
Benjamin Abella was born and raised in Hyde Park, Chicago. His father, Isaac Abella, was a physics professor at the University of Chicago, and his mother, Mary Ann Abella, was a professor of Art at Chicago State University. He has one sibling, a sister Sarah Abella. In high school, Abella showed aptitude for science, placing 3rd nationally in the Westinghouse Science Talent Search.

Abella completed his B.A. in Biochemistry from Washington University in St. Louis in 1992. He completed his M.Phil. in Genetics from the University of Cambridge in the following year. In 1998, Abella received his MD degree from Johns Hopkins School of Medicine.

== Career ==
Abella joined University of Pennsylvania's Department of Emergency Medicine as an Assistant Professor in the early 2000s. In 2013, he was promoted to Associate Professor and to Professor in 2017. Along with academic appointments, he has also been involved with administrative responsibilities. From 2007 to 2017, he co-chaired the Hospital Clinical Emergencies Committee and was appointed as Vice Chair of Research at the Department of Emergency Medicine during this tenure. In 2016, he was appointed as Director of Center for Resuscitation Science and of Penn Acute Research Collaboration.

Abella chaired the Council on Cardiopulmonary, Critical Care and Resuscitation for the American Heart Association from 2015 till 2017, and served as the Co-Chair of the American Heart Association Resuscitation Science Symposium from 2014 until 2022. He also served on the Obama campaign Medical Advisory Board.

Abella has discussed cardiac arrest and his research work on Good Morning America, National Geographic, and other national media sources. He worked with Sanjay Gupta on the CNN documentary Cheating Death and is featured in Gupta's book of the same title.

Abella currently serves as an emergency care consultant to the National Basketball Association and was appointed by Governor Josh Shapiro to the Pennsylvania Board of Medicine in 2023. In 2024, he was named the system chair of Emergency Medicine for the Mount Sinai Health System.

== Research ==
Abella has conducted research on sudden cardiac arrest, myocardial perfusion and targeted temperature management. He has also worked on evaluation of CPR and resuscitation performance, testing of new teaching methods of CPR, assessment of neurologic outcomes after cardiac arrest and methods to improve the application of therapeutic hypothermia. He developed a training course for post-arrest care and targeted temperature management, known as the Penn TTM Academy.

=== Targeted temperature management (TTM) ===
Abella studied the practical implementation of TTM after cardiac arrest and presented a detailed management plan for the addition of TTM for in the care of out of hospital cardiac arrest survivors. He developed an important animal model to study post-arrest TTM. He was one of the first to establish that intra-arrest TTM could dramatically improve arrest outcomes, which has subsequently sparked clinical trials to study the same concept.

=== CPR delivery and resuscitation performance ===
Abella research in this area indicated an improved CPR quality through a combination of a training procedure (termed “RAPID” post arrest training) along with real-time audiovisual feedback. This combined procedure also led to a greater rate of return of spontaneous circulation. In early 2010s, Abella published an article about the importance of cardiopulmonary resuscitation quality and presented several practical approaches such as using real-time CPR sensing, physiologic monitoring and metronome prompting in order to improve the CPR performance.

== Awards and honors ==
- 2004 - Academic Excellence Award, Emergency Medicine Residents Association
- 2007 - Operational Quality Award for Post-Cardiac Arrest Resuscitation and Hypothermia, Hospital of the University of Pennsylvania
- 2008 - Health Breakthrough Award, Ladies Home Journal magazine
- 2011 - Fabien Vickrey MD Memorial Award in Emergency Medicine, York Hospital
- 2015 - William Montgomery, MD Excellence in Education Award
- 2017 - 3CPR Distinguished Service Award, American Heart Association
- 2018 - Practitioner of the Year Award, Philadelphia County Medical Society

== Selected articles ==
- Abella BS, Alvarado JP, Myklebust H, Edelson DP, Barry A, O'Hearn N, Vanden Hoek TL, Becker LB. Quality of cardiopulmonary resuscitation during in-hospital cardiac arrest. JAMA. 2005; 293(3):305-10.
- Edelson DP, Abella BS, Kramer-Johansen J, Wik L, Myklebust H, Barry AM, Merchant RM, Vanden Hoek TL, Steen PA, Becker LB. Effects of compression depth and pre-shock pauses predict defibrillation failure during cardiac arrest. Resuscitation 2006; 71(2):137-45.
- Meaney PA, Bobrow BJ, Mancini ME, Christenson J, de Caen AR, Bhanji F, Abella BS, Kleinman ME, Edelson DP, Berg RA, Aufderheide TP, Menon V, Leary M; CPR Quality Summit Investigators, the American Heart Association Emergency Cardiovascular Care Committee, and the Council on Cardiopulmonary, Critical Care, Perioperative and Resuscitation. Cardiopulmonary resuscitation quality: [corrected] improving cardiac resuscitation outcomes both inside and outside the hospital: a consensus statement from the American Heart Association. Circulation. 2013;128(4):417-35.
- Heldman AW, Cheng L, Jenkins GM, Heller PF, Kim DW, Ware M Jr, Nater C, Hruban RH, Rezai B, Abella BS, Bunge KE, Kinsella JL, Sollott SJ, Lakatta EG, Brinker JA, Hunter WL, Froehlich JP. Paclitaxel stent coating inhibits neointimal hyperplasia at 4 weeks in a porcine model of coronary restenosis. Circulation. 2001; 103(18):2289-95.
- Abella BS, Zhao D, Alvarado J, Vanden Hoek TL, Becker LB. Intra-arrest cooling improves outcomes in a murine cardiac arrest model. Circulation. 2004; 109(22):2786-91.
