= Jennifer Stefano =

- Education: Villanova University
- Occupations: Executive, activist

Jennifer Stefano serves on the Forbes Nonprofit Council, and is an Advisory Council Member for Women in Leadership at The George Washington University School of Business.

Stefano felt disenfranchised by politics in 2008 when she discovered the nascent Tea Party at a local rally. She then joined Americans for Prosperity (AFP) and Americans for Prosperity Foundation (AFPF) and rose through their leadership ranks. Leaving AFP/AFPF in 2016, she joined the Commonwealth Foundation based out of Harrisburg, Pennsylvania. Stefano has been published in numerous newspaper and online publications.

Since 2022, Stefano has been a columnist for The Philadelphia Inquirer.

Stefano is a philanthropist and advocate for Donor-advised funds for various causes.

== Personal life ==
Stefano is married and she and her husband are Roman Catholics.
