= Derek S. Green =

American politician and Democratic member of the Philadelphia City Council

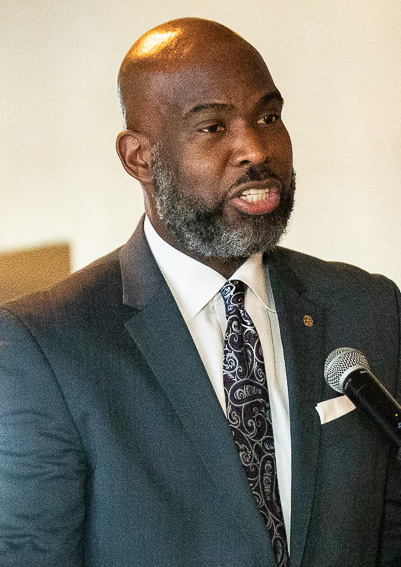
- Derek Green in 2021

Member of the Philadelphia City Council from the at-large district
- In office January 4, 2016 – September 6, 2022
- Succeeded by: Sharon Vaughn

Personal details
- Party: Democratic
- Education: University of Virginia; Temple University School of Law
- Profession: Lawyer
- Website: Official website

Derek S. Green is an American politician and Democratic was a member of the Philadelphia City Council from 2016 to 2022.

He was a candidate for the Democratic nomination for the 2023 Philadelphia mayoral election.

== Education and career ==
Green graduated from the University of Virginia and received his JD from Temple University School of Law. He worked as an assistant district attorney and assistant deputy attorney general for the State of Delaware, and then served as a deputy city solicitor for the City of Philadelphia in the housing and community development division.

Green worked for several years as a legislative aide and special counsel for former councilmember Marian Tasco and an attorney for the council committees on finance and public health and human services. He has also worked on several local and state campaigns.

== Political career ==
Green initially ran for the Philadelphia City Council in 2007 but lost. In 2008, he was described as one of the "10 under 40" rising political stars in the city by The Philadelphia Inquirer. He was expected to run for the 8th district seat upon the retirement of Donna Reed Miller in 2011, but he decided to remain as special council to Tasco.

In 2015, he was elected to the city council after winning one of the five Democratic nominations for at-large seats. He received the most votes out of the 16 candidates seeking the primary nominations. He successfully ran for reelection in 2019 and was one of the top fundraisers in the race.

In late 2022, Green announced his bid for Philadelphia mayor. He dropped out of the race in April 2023. After suspending his mayoral campaign, it was announced that Green would be entering the private sector, joining Bellevue Strategies.

== Personal life ==
Green lives in Mount Airy with his wife and son, who has autism. He raises money for Autism Speaks and founded the first autism support class at Houston Elementary School with his wife.

== See also ==
- List of members of Philadelphia City Council since 1952
