= Rebecca Rhynhart =

American politician

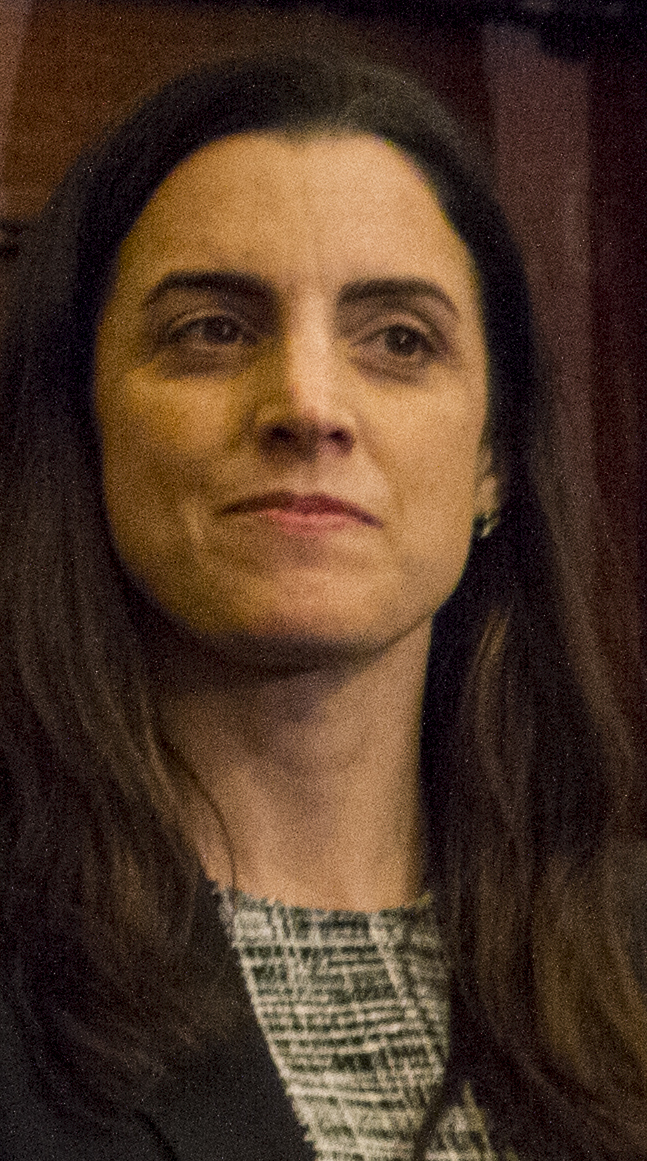

City Controller of Philadelphia
- In office January 1, 2018 – October 25, 2022
- Preceded by: Alan Butkovitz
- Succeeded by: Christy Brady (acting)

Personal details
- Born: September 29, 1974 (age 51) Madison, Wisconsin, U.S.
- Party: Democratic
- Spouse: David McDuff
- Education: Middlebury College (BA); Columbia University (MPA)

Rebecca Rhynhart (born September 29, 1974) is an American politician from Pennsylvania. A member of the Democratic Party, she served as the City Controller of Philadelphia from 2018 to 2022. Prior to running for City Controller, Rhynhart worked in Philadelphia city government as City Treasurer and Budget Director in the administration of Mayor Michael Nutter. Prior to joining city government, Rhynhart worked in public financing at Fitch Ratings and then as a managing director for municipal derivatives at investment bank Bear Stearns, just prior to the financial collapse of 2008.

== Education ==
Rhynhart grew up in Reform Jewish family in Abington, Pennsylvania. She has a Bachelor of Arts from Middlebury College and earned a graduate degree in Public Administration from Columbia University.

== Political career ==
=== Prior involvement in Philadelphia government ===
In 2008, Rhynhart became Philadelphia’s City Treasurer as part of Mayor Michael Nutter’s administration. She subsequently became Budget Director, playing a pivotal role in the city’s economic recovery from The Great Recession.

Rhynhart also served as the Chief Administrative Officer in Mayor Jim Kenney’s administration.

=== Philadelphia City Controller ===
Rhynhart is the first woman ever elected to the office of controller in the city of Philadelphia. She won a primary challenge by 17 percentage points against three-time democratic incumbent Alan Butkovitz in the Spring of 2017. This was considered a significant upset victory as it was an off-year election and Butkovitz was backed by the Democratic Party. Rhynhart went on to defeat Republican Mike Tomlinson in the November general election of that same year where she won over 80% of the vote.

On October 18, 2022, Rhynhart's office released a review of Philadelphia Police Department spending and performance. The report detailed disparities in 911 response times, crime fighting strategy, staffing issues, community relations, and data collection and usage. It was widely perceived as critical of the police department. One week later, on October 25, 2022, Rhynhart resigned from her position as controller to run for mayor. She told The Philadelphia Inquirer that she waited to start her campaign until after the release of the report.

== 2023 Philadelphia mayoral election ==
Rhynhart ran for mayor in the 2023 Philadelphia mayoral election. Her candidacy was endorsed by former mayors John Street and Michael Nutter. She came in second in the primary election.
