= 2023 Philadelphia City Council election =

- November 7, 2023

17 Seats on the Philadelphia City Council 9 seats needed for a majority
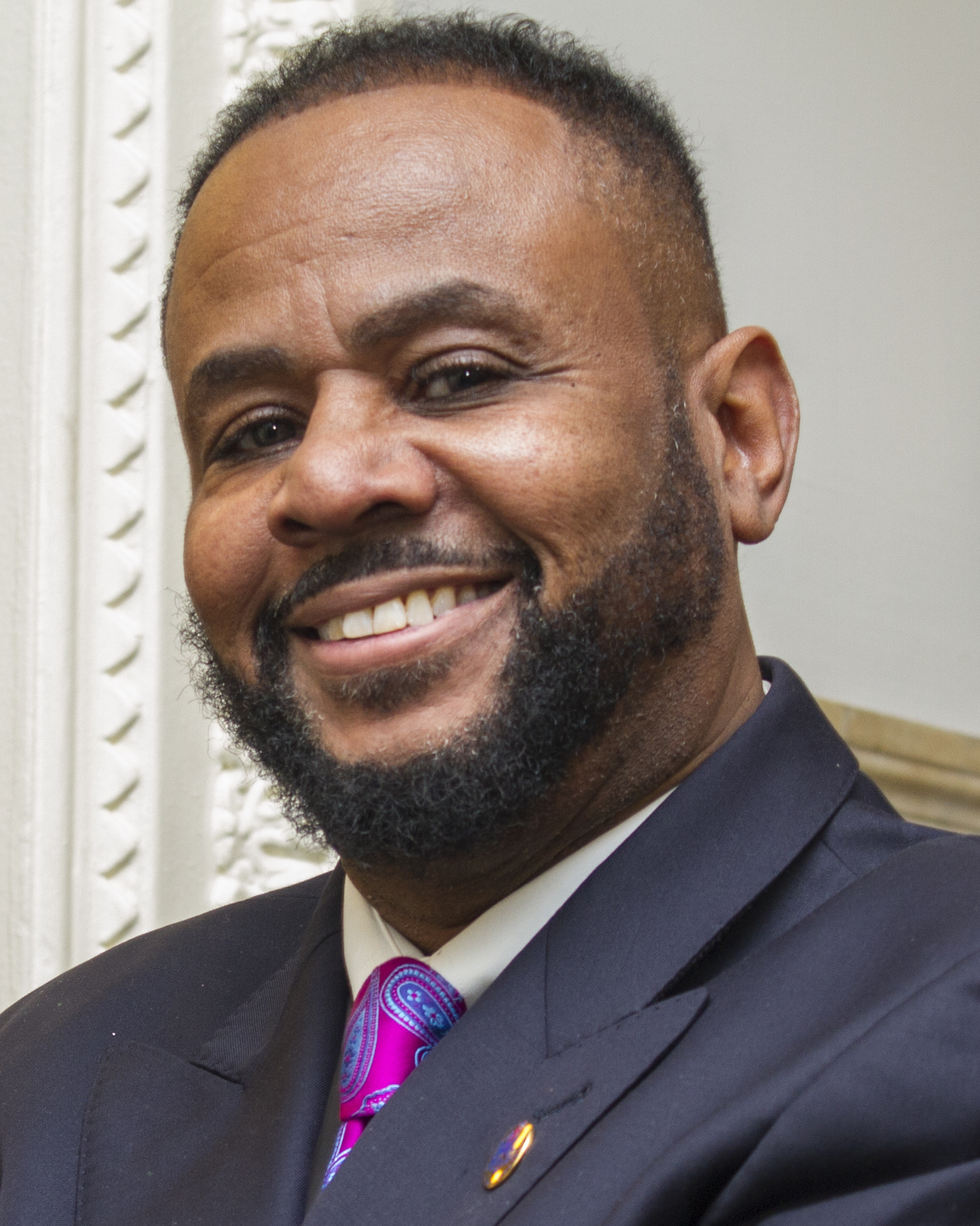

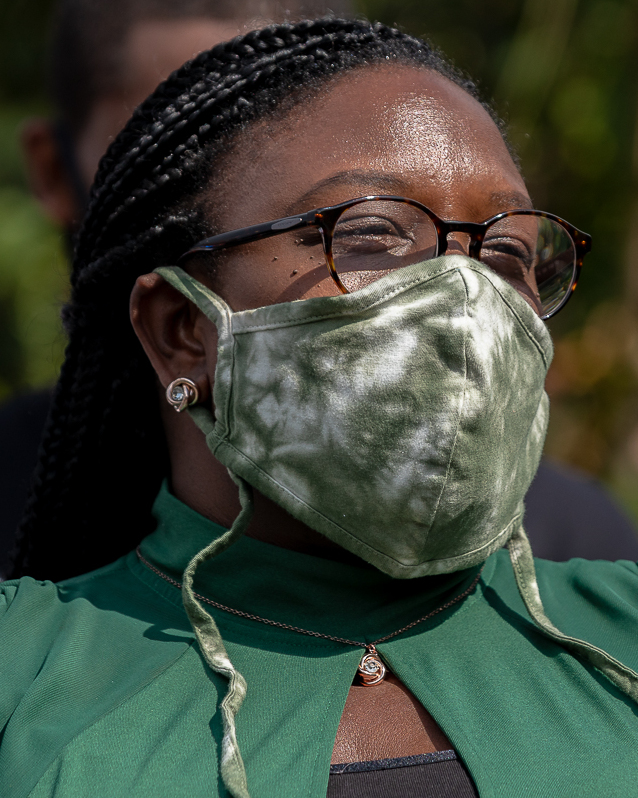

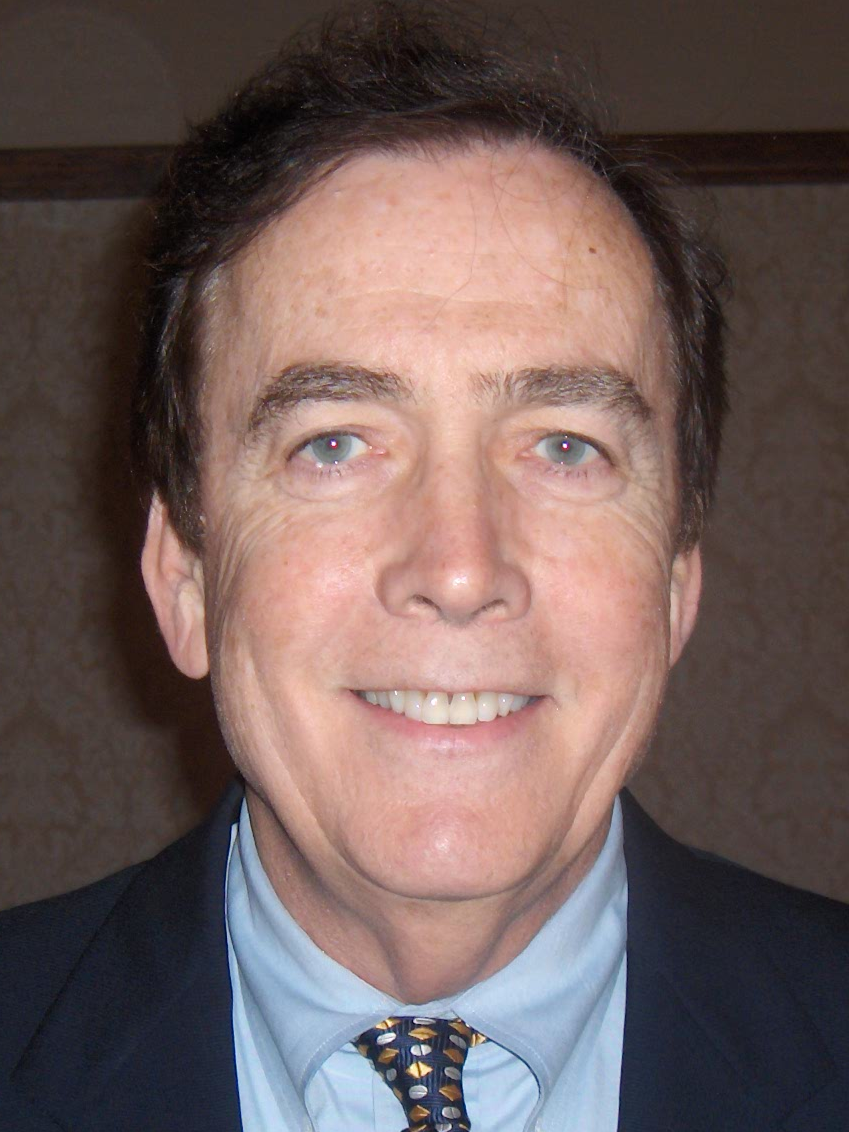
	First party	Second party	Third party
Leader	Curtis J. Jones Jr.	Kendra Brooks	Brian O'Neill
Party	Democratic	Working Families	Republican
Leader's seat	District 4	At-Large	District 10
Last election	15	1	2
Seats before	14	1	2
Seats won	14	2	1
Seat change	Steady	▲1	▼1
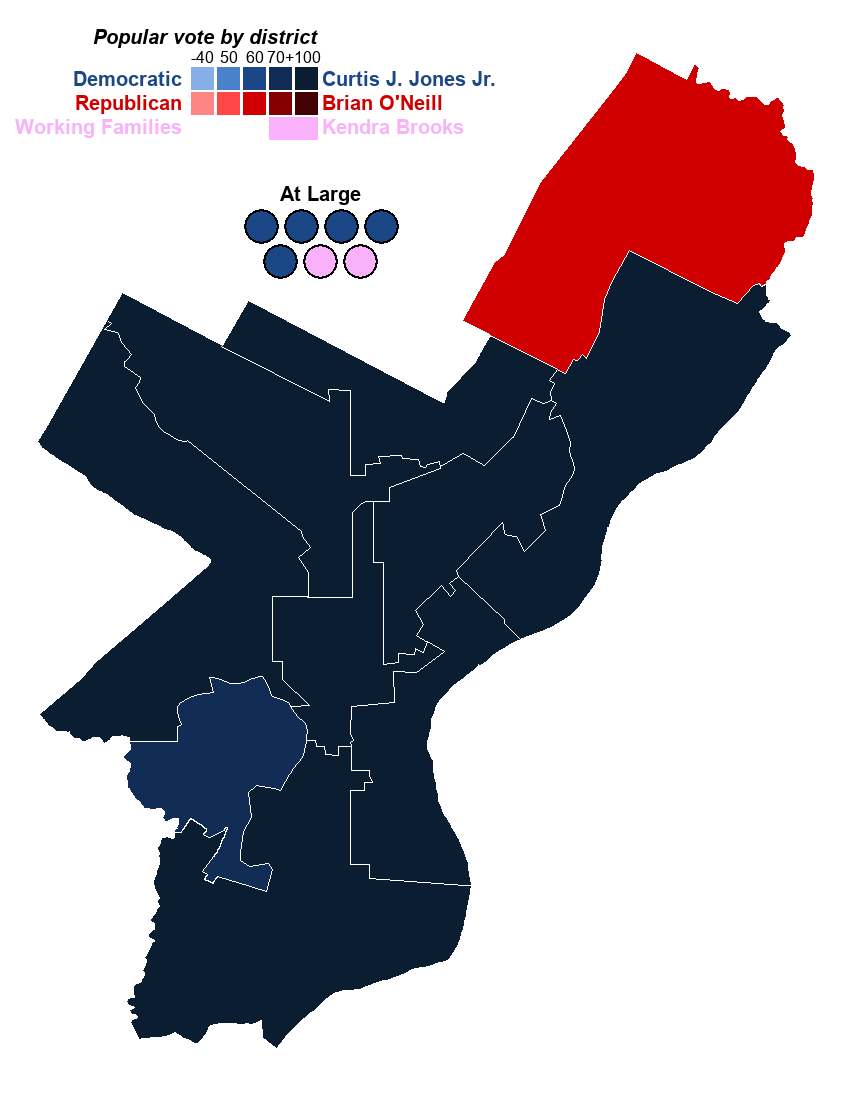
- Map of the general election. District results are shown, with the at-large district also depicted.
Council President before election
Darrell L. Clarke
Democratic
Elected Council President
Kenyatta Johnson
Democratic

The 2023 Philadelphia City Council election was held November 7, 2023; all seats on the Philadelphia City Council were up for election. The Democratic Party maintained its super-majority on the council. The election took place on the same day as the 2023 Philadelphia mayoral election and other local elections in the Commonwealth.

== Background ==
In 2019, Philadelphians re-elected Jim Kenney to a second term as mayor and four new councilmembers joined the city council. Katherine Gilmore Richardson and Isaiah Thomas were elected to at-large seats. Jamie Gauthier beat incumbent Jannie Blackwell in the District 3 primary and Kendra Brooks made history as the first third-party city councilmember in Philadelphia as a Working Families Party candidate.

In preparation for the 2023 Philadelphia mayoral election, four City Councilmembers resigned (Green, Domb, Parker, and Quiñones-Sánchez) to run or prepare to run for mayor. While three were still considering running (Gym, Oh, and Bass). Council President Darrell Clarke announced a special election to replace the members.

6th District Councilmember Bobby Henon resigned after being convicted of corruption charges and was replaced with Michael Driscoll. 2nd District Councilmember Kenyatta Johnson was facing bribery charges in the months leading up to the election, but was acquitted on November 2, five days before Election Day.

== 1st District ==
Incumbent Mark Squilla ran for re-election.

=== Democratic primary ===
==== Nominee ====
- Mark Squilla, incumbent councilor and majority whip

==== Withdrew ====
- Amanda Mclllmurary, cofounder of Reclaim Philadelphia (ran for an at-large seat)

==== Results ====
Democratic primary results
Party	Candidate	Votes	%
Democratic	Mark Squilla (incumbent)	22,922	98.40
Write-in		372	1.60
Total votes		23,294	100.00

=== Republican primary ===
==== Results ====
Republican primary results
Party	Candidate	Votes	%
	Write-in	42	100.00
Total votes		42	100.00

=== General election ===
==== Results ====
District 1, 2023 general election
Party	Candidate	Votes	%
Democratic	Mark Squilla (incumbent)	Unopposed	
Total votes		29,685	100.00
Democratic hold			

== 2nd District ==
Incumbent Kenyatta Johnson ran for re-election.

=== Democratic primary ===
==== Nominee ====
- Kenyatta Johnson, incumbent councilor

==== Disqualified ====
- Aaron Humphrey, campaign manager
- Boogie Rose, community activist and former teacher

==== Results ====
Democratic primary results
Party	Candidate	Votes	%
Democratic	Kenyatta Johnson (incumbent)	18,884	95.20
Write-in		952	4.80
Total votes		19,836	100.00

=== Republican primary ===
==== Results ====
Republican primary results
Party	Candidate	Votes	%
	Write-in	34	100.00
Total votes		34	100.00

=== General election ===
==== Results ====
District 2, 2023 general election
Party	Candidate	Votes	%
Democratic	Kenyatta Johnson (incumbent)	Unopposed	
Total votes		26,947	100.00
Democratic hold			

== 3rd District ==
2023 Philadelphia City Council 3rd district election
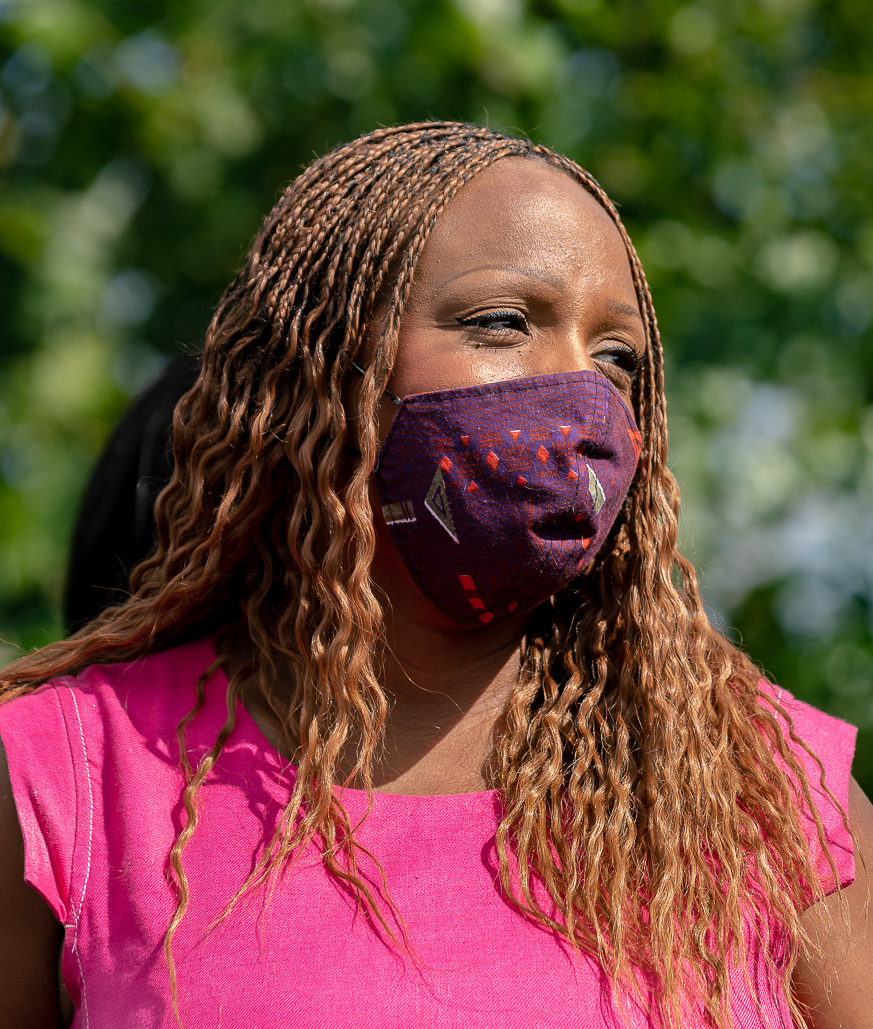

Candidate	Jamie Gauthier	Jabari Jones
Party	Democratic	Independent
Popular vote	22,431	3,403
Percentage	86.62%	13.14%
- Results by precinct Gauthier: 60–70% 70–80% 80–90% >90%
Councilmember before election
Jamie Gauthier
Democratic
Elected Councilmember
Jamie Gauthier
Democratic

Incumbent Jamie Gauthier ran for re-election.

=== Democratic primary ===
==== Nominee ====
- Jamie Gauthier, incumbent councilor

==== Disqualified ====
- Mustafa Majeed, community activist

==== Withdrew ====
- Jabari Jones, trade association president (ran as an independent)

==== Declined ====
- Amen Brown, state representative (ran for mayor)

==== Endorsements ====
Jamie Gauthier

Organizations

- Reclaim Philadelphia

Political parties

- Working Families Party

==== Results ====
Democratic primary results
Party	Candidate	Votes	%
Democratic	Jamie Gauthier (incumbent)	16,402	99.41
Write-in		97	0.59
Total votes		16,499	100.00

=== Republican primary ===
==== Results ====
Republican primary results
Party	Candidate	Votes	%
	Write-in	16	100.00
Total votes		16	100.00

=== Third party and independent candidates ===
- Jabari Jones (Independent), trade association president

==== Disqualified ====
- Andre Kersey (Libertarian)

=== General election ===
==== Results ====
District 3, 2023 general election
Party	Candidate	Votes	%
Democratic	Jamie Gauthier (incumbent)	22,431	86.62
Independent	Jabari Jones	3,403	13.14
Write-in		61	0.24
Total votes		25,895	100.00

== 4th District ==
Incumbent Curtis J. Jones Jr. ran for re-election.

=== Democratic primary ===
==== Nominee ====
- Curtis J. Jones Jr., incumbent councilor and majority leader

==== Disqualified ====
- Darrel Smith Jr., child welfare worker

==== Declined ====
- Alexandra Hunt, public health researcher and candidate for Pennsylvania's 3rd congressional district in 2022 (ran for controller)

==== Results ====
Democratic primary results
Party	Candidate	Votes	%
Democratic	Curtis J. Jones Jr. (incumbent)	20,427	98.41
Write-in		331	1.59
Total votes		20,758	100.00

=== Republican primary ===
==== Results ====
Republican primary results
Party	Candidate	Votes	%
	Write-in	26	100.00
Total votes		26	100.00

=== General election ===
==== Results ====
District 4, 2023 general election
Party	Candidate	Votes	%
Democratic	Curtis J. Jones Jr. (incumbent)	Unopposed	
Total votes		26,493	100.00
Democratic hold			

== 5th District ==
Incumbent Darrell L. Clarke retired. Clarke announced his retirement less than two weeks before the deadline to submit ballot petitions, in what media interpreted as an attempt to prevent state senator Sharif Street's preferred candidate from making the ballot. However, both Clarke's and Street's preferred successors failed to make the ballot, as did every other candidate except for one.

=== Democratic primary ===
==== Nominee ====
- Jeffery Young Jr., attorney

==== Did not qualify ====
- Patrick Griffin, attorney
- Jon Hankins, pastor and member of the Pennsylvania Democratic State Committee
- Aissia Richardson, staffer for state senator Sharif Street
- Curtis Wilkerson, former chief of staff to incumbent Darrell L. Clarke

==== Withdrew ====
- Jose Miranda, former state representative and convicted felon
- Isa Matin

==== Declined ====
- Darrell L. Clarke, incumbent councilor and council president (endorsed Wilkerson)

==== Endorsements ====
Curtis Wilkerson (disqualified)

Local officials

- Darrell L. Clarke, incumbent councilor and council president

==== Results ====
Democratic primary results
Party	Candidate	Votes	%
Democratic	Jeffery Young Jr.	14,789	93.48
Write-in		1,032	6.52
Total votes		15,821	100.00

=== Republican primary ===
==== Results ====
Republican primary results
Party	Candidate	Votes	%
	Write-in	30	100.00
Total votes		30	100.00

=== General election ===
==== Results ====
District 5, 2023 general election
Party	Candidate	Votes	%
Democratic	Jeffery Young Jr.	Unopposed	
Total votes		24,656	100.00
Democratic hold			

== 6th District ==
Incumbent Michael Driscoll ran for re-election.

=== Democratic primary ===
==== Nominee ====
- Michael Driscoll, incumbent councilor

==== Results ====
Democratic primary results
Party	Candidate	Votes	%
Democratic	Michael Driscoll (incumbent)	8,807	99.56
Write-in		39	0.44
Total votes		8,846	100.00

=== Republican primary ===
==== Did not qualify ====
- Russell Kubach, realtor

==== Results ====
Republican primary results
Party	Candidate	Votes	%
	Write-in	38	100.00
Total votes		38	100.00

=== General election ===
==== Results ====
District 6, 2023 general election
Party	Candidate	Votes	%
Democratic	Michael Driscoll (incumbent)	Unopposed	
Total votes		13,559	100.00
Democratic hold			

== 7th District ==
The 7th district seat was filled by Quetcy Lozada in the 2022 special election. Lozada ran for re-election.

=== Democratic primary ===
==== Nominee ====
- Quetcy Lozada, incumbent councilor

==== Eliminated in primary ====
- Andrés Celin, community organizer

==== Endorsements ====
Andrés Celin

Organizations

- Philadelphia Democratic Socialists of America
Quetcy Lozada

Newspapers

- The Philadelphia Inquirer

==== Results ====
Results by precinct Lozada: 50–60%; 60–70%; 70–80%; 80–90%; 90%–100%; Celin: 50–60%; 60–70%; 70–80%; 80–90%; Tie: 40–50%; 50%

Democratic primary results
Party	Candidate	Votes	%
Democratic	Quetcy Lozada (incumbent)	5,235	59.51
Democratic	Andrés Celin	3,548	40.33
Write-in		14	0.16
Total votes		8,797	100.00

=== Republican primary ===
==== Did not qualify ====
- James Whitehead, nominee for this district in the 2022 special election

==== Results ====
Republican primary results
Party	Candidate	Votes	%
	Write-in	29	100.00
Total votes		29	100.00

=== General election ===
==== Results ====
District 7, 2023 general election
Party	Candidate	Votes	%
Democratic	Quetcy Lozada (incumbent)	Unopposed	
Total votes		11,243	100.00

== 8th District ==
Incumbent Cindy Bass ran for re-election.

=== Democratic primary ===
==== Nominee ====
- Cindy Bass, incumbent councilor

==== Eliminated in primary ====
- Seth Anderson-Oberman, community organizer

==== Declined ====
- Erika Almirón, candidate for an at-large seat in 2019 (ran for an at-large seat)

==== Endorsements ====
Seth Anderson-Oberman

State legislators

- Chris Rabb, state representative

Newspapers

- The Philadelphia Inquirer

Organizations

- Philadelphia Democratic Socialists of America
- Reclaim Philadelphia

Political parties

- Working Families Party

==== Results ====
Results by precinct Bass: 50–60%; 60–70%; 70–80%; 80–90%; 90%–100%; Anderson-Oberman: 50–60%; 60–70%; 70–80%; 80–90%; Tie: 50%

Democratic primary results
Party	Candidate	Votes	%
Democratic	Cindy Bass (incumbent)	13,497	50.73
Democratic	Seth Anderson-Oberman	13,074	49.14
Write-in		37	0.14
Total votes		26,608	100.00

=== Republican primary ===
==== Results ====
Republican primary results
Party	Candidate	Votes	%
	Write-in	25	100.00
Total votes		25	100.00

=== General election ===
==== Results ====
District 8, 2023 general election
Party	Candidate	Votes	%
Democratic	Cindy Bass (incumbent)	Unopposed	
Total votes		28,637	100.00

== 9th District ==
The 9th district seat was filled by Anthony Phillips in the 2022 special election. Phillips ran for re-election.

=== Democratic primary ===
==== Nominee ====
- Anthony Phillips, incumbent councilor

==== Eliminated in primary ====
- Janay Hawthorne, co-chair of New Leaders Council Philadelphia
- James Williams, former city council staffer
- Yvette Young, Pottsgrove School District facilities director

==== Endorsements ====
Anthony Phillips

Newspapers

- The Philadelphia Inquirer

==== Results ====
Results by precinct Phillips: 40–50%; 50–60%; 60–70%; 70–80%; 80–90%; Young: 40–50%; 50–60%; 60–70%; Tie: 40–50%

Democratic primary results
Party	Candidate	Votes	%
Democratic	Anthony Phillips (incumbent)	11,922	63.12
Democratic	Yvette Young	5,013	26.54
Democratic	James Williams	1,932	10.23
Write-in		22	0.12
Total votes		18,889	100.00

=== Republican primary ===
==== Withdrawn ====
- Roslyn Ross, nominee for this district in the 2023 special election

==== Results ====
Republican primary results
Party	Candidate	Votes	%
	Write-in	30	100.00
Total votes		30	100.00

=== General election ===
==== Results ====
District 9, 2023 general election
Party	Candidate	Votes	%
Democratic	Anthony Phillips (incumbent)	Unopposed	
Total votes		24,780	100.00
Democratic hold			

== 10th District ==
2023 Philadelphia City Council 10th district election
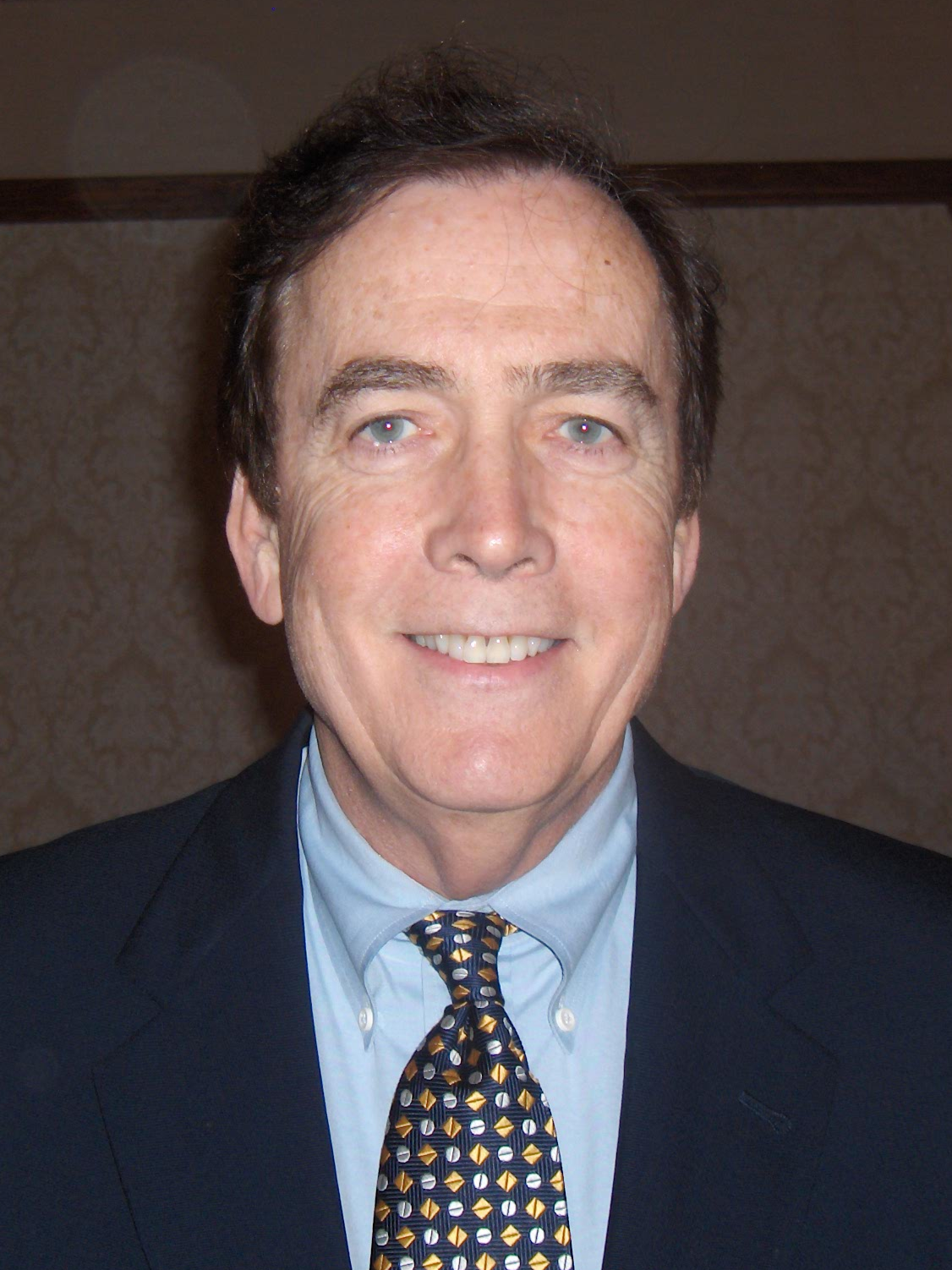

Candidate	Brian J. O'Neill	Gary Masino
Party	Republican	Democratic
Popular vote	17,386	11,244
Percentage	60.62%	39.21%
- Results by precinct O'Neill: 40–50% 50–60% 60–70% 70–80% Masino: 50–60% 60–70% Tie: 50%
Councilmember before election
Brian J. O'Neill
Republican
Elected Councilmember
Brian J. O'Neill
Republican

Incumbent Brian J. O'Neill ran for re-election.

=== Republican primary ===
==== Nominee ====
- Brian J. O'Neill, incumbent councilor and minority leader

==== Did not qualify ====
- Roman Zhukhov, real estate professional and neighborhood watch group president

==== Results ====
Republican primary results
Party	Candidate	Votes	%
Republican	Brian J. O'Neill (incumbent)	4,734	99.73
Write-in		13	0.27
Total votes		4,747	100.00

=== Democratic primary ===
==== Nominee ====
- Gary Masino, president of Sheet Metal Workers Union Local 19

==== Results ====
Democratic primary results
Party	Candidate	Votes	%
Democratic	Gary Masino	8,962	99.27
Write-in		66	0.73
Total votes		9,028	100.00

=== General election ===
==== Results ====
District 10, 2023 general election
Party	Candidate	Votes	%
Republican	Brian J. O'Neill (incumbent)	17,386	60.62
Democratic	Gary Masino	11,244	39.21
Write-in		48	0.17
Total votes		28,678	100.00
Republican hold			

== At-Large Seats ==
Philadelphia City Council has seven at-large seats, two of which must be represented by a minority party. Two at-large seats were temporarily vacant due to the resignations of Derek S. Green and Allan Domb to consider mayoral runs. They were filled in the special election on November 8, 2022. There will be three open seats in the 2023 election due to the resignations of Helen Gym and David Oh, and the retirement of Sharon Vaughn.

Each party may nominate five candidates for the general election. Voters can select up to five candidates in both the primary and general.

=== Democratic primary ===
==== Advanced to general election ====
- Nina Ahmad, former deputy mayor, nominee for Pennsylvania Auditor General in 2020, and candidate for Lieutenant Governor in 2018
- Katherine Gilmore Richardson, incumbent councilor
- Jim Harrity, incumbent councilor
- Rue Landau, community services attorney and former executive director of the Philadelphia Commission on Human Relations
- Isaiah Thomas, incumbent councilor

==== Eliminated in primary ====
- Erika Almirón, community organizer and candidate for an at-large seat in 2019
- Jalon Alexander, attorney
- Sherrie Cohen, former tenants rights attorney and independent candidate for an at-large seat in 2019
- Luz Colón, former commissioner of the Governor's Advisory Commission on Latino Affairs (2015–2023)
- Wayne Dorsey
- Abu Edwards, political action chair of the NAACP Philadelphia chapter
- Christopher Gladstone Booth, public school teacher
- Ogbonna Hagins, activist
- Job Itzkowitz, director of Old City District
- John Kelly III, biomedical company CFO and son of Jack Kelly Jr.
- Amanda McIllmurray, cofounder of Reclaim Philadelphia
- Matthew Modzelewski, customer service professional
- Daniel Orsino, housing counselor and Republican nominee for the 1st district in 2019
- Michelle Prettyman, educator and small business owner
- Charles Reyes, former Philadelphia Department of Education official
- Melissa Robbins, activist and Vice President of Advocacy and Public Policy at the Urban League of Philadelphia
- Eryn Santamoor, former chief of staff to then-councilor Allan Domb
- Curtis Segers, assistant elementary school principal
- Derwood Selby
- George Stevenson
- Donovan West, business owner and former CEO of the Pennsylvania African American Chamber of Commerce
- Deshawnda Williams

==== Did not qualify ====
- Terrill Haigler, community organizer and former sanitation worker
- Ronald Martin, security guard and small business owner
- Billy McCann
- Will Mega, activist and contestant on Season 1 of Big Brother USA
- Matthew Modzelewski, customer service professional
- Clayton Price
- Max Tuttleman, philanthropist

==== Withdrawn ====
- Michael Galvan, nonprofit executive and former Philadelphia Director of Education Policy

==== Declined ====
- Sharon Vaughn, incumbent councilor (2023–present)

==== Endorsements ====
Nina Ahmad

U.S. representatives

- Dwight Evans, U.S. representative from Pennsylvania's 3rd congressional district (2016–present)

Newspapers

- The Philadelphia Inquirer (co-endorsement with Itzkowitz, Gilmore Richardson, Santamoor, and Thomas)
Erika Almirón

Organizations

- Reclaim Philadelphia (co-endorsement with Gilmore Richardson, Landau, McIllmurray, and Thomas)
- Make the Road Action in PA (co-endorsement with Thomas, Robbins, and Landau)

Political parties

- Working Families Party (co-endorsement with Brooks, Landau, McIllmurray, O'Rourke, and Thomas)
Job Itzkowitz

Newspapers

- The Philadelphia Inquirer (co-endorsement with Ahmed, Gilmore Richardson, Santamoor, and Thomas)
Katherine Gilmore Richardson

Newspapers

- The Philadelphia Inquirer (co-endorsement with Ahmed, Itzkowitz, Santamoor, and Thomas)

Organizations

- Reclaim Philadelphia (co-endorsement with Almirón, Landau, McIllmurray, and Thomas)
- PASNAP (co-endorsement with Thomas, Robbins, Harrity, and Edwards)

Political parties

- Philadelphia Democratic Party (co-endorsement with Harrity, Landau, and Thomas)
Jim Harrity

Political parties

- Philadelphia Democratic Party (co-endorsement with Gilmore Richardson, Landau, and Thomas)

Organizations

- PASNAP (co-endorsement with Thomas, Robbins, Gilmore Richardson, and Edwards)
Rue Landau

State legislators

- Nikil Saval, Pennsylvania State Senator from the 1st district (2021–present) (co-endorsement with Brooks and McIllmurray)
- Ben Waxman, Pennsylvania State Representative from the 182nd district (2023–present)

Local officials

- Kendra Brooks, at-large councilor (2020–present) (Working Families)
- Helen Gym, at-large councilor (2016-2022)
- Larry Krasner, Philadelphia District Attorney (2018–present) (co-endorsement with McIllmurray)

Organizations

- Reclaim Philadelphia (co-endorsement with Almirón, Gilmore Richardson, McIllmurray, and Thomas)
- Make the Road Action in PA (co-endorsement with Thomas, Robbins, and Almiron)

Political parties

- Philadelphia Democratic Party (co-endorsement with Gilmore Richardson, Harrity, and Thomas)
- Working Families Party (co-endorsement with Almirón, Brooks, McIllmurray, O'Rourke, and Thomas)
Amanda McIllmurray

State legislators

- Elizabeth Fiedler, Pennsylvania State Representative from the 184th district (2019–present) (co-endorsement with Brooks)
- Rick Krajewski, Pennsylvania State Representative from the 188th district (2021–present)
- Nikil Saval, Pennsylvania State Senator from the 1st district (2021–present) (co-endorsement with Brooks and Landau)

Local officials

- Larry Krasner, Philadelphia District Attorney (2018–present) (co-endorsement with Landau)

Organizations

- Reclaim Philadelphia (co-endorsement with Almirón, Gilmore Richardson, Landau, and Thomas)
- Philadelphia Democratic Socialists of America (co-endorsement with Brooks and O'Rourke)

Political parties

- Working Families Party (co-endorsement with Almirón, Brooks, Landau, O'Rourke, and Thomas)
Eryn Santamoor

Statewide officials

- Ed Rendell, former governor of Pennsylvania (2003–2011) and former mayor of Philadelphia (1992–2000)

Local officials

- Michael Nutter, former mayor of Philadelphia (2008–2016)

Newspapers

- The Philadelphia Inquirer (co-endorsement with Ahmed, Itzkowitz, Gilmore Richardson, and Thomas)
Isaiah Thomas

Newspapers

- The Philadelphia Inquirer (co-endorsement with Ahmed, Itzkowitz, Gilmore Richardson, and Santamoor)

Organizations

- Reclaim Philadelphia (co-endorsement with Almirón, Gilmore Richardson, Landau, and McIllmurray)
- PASNAP (co-endorsement with Robbins, Gilmore Richardson, Harrity, and Edwards)
- Make the Road Action in PA (co-endorsement with Robbins, Almiron, and Landau)

Political parties

- Philadelphia Democratic Party (co-endorsement with Gilmore Richardson, Harrity, and Landau)
- Working Families Party (co-endorsement with Almirón, Brooks, Landau, McIllmurray, and O'Rourke)
Melissa Robbins

Organizations

- PASNAP (co-endorsement with Thomas, Gilmore Richardson, Harrity, and Edwards)
- Make the Road Action in PA (co-endorsement with Thomas, Almiron, and Landau)

==== Results ====
Democratic primary results
Party	Candidate	Votes	%
Democratic	Isaiah Thomas (incumbent)	108,330	12.85
Democratic	Katherine Gilmore Richardson (incumbent)	93,416	11.08
Democratic	Rue Landau	75,798	8.99
Democratic	Nina Ahmad	66,689	7.91
Democratic	Jim Harrity (incumbent)	52,323	6.21
Democratic	Eryn Santamoor	47,410	5.62
Democratic	Amanda McIllmurray	46,379	5.50
Democratic	Erika Almirón	43,029	5.10
Democratic	Sherrie Cohen	32,430	3.85
Democratic	Job Itzkowitz	27,648	3.28
Democratic	Melissa Robbins	24,523	2.91
Democratic	Deshawnda Williams	22,506	2.67
Democratic	Luz Colón	21,917	2.60
Democratic	Donovan West	21,830	2.59
Democratic	John Kelly III	21,153	2.51
Democratic	Jalon Alexander	16,628	1.97
Democratic	Qiana Shedrick	16,422	1.95
Democratic	Abu Edwards	15,105	1.79
Democratic	Michelle Prettyman	14,720	1.75
Democratic	NaDerah Griffin	12,354	1.47
Democratic	Derwood Selby	11,952	1.42
Democratic	Charles Reyes	11,301	1.34
Democratic	Wayne Dorsey	10,378	1.23
Democratic	Ogbonna Hagins	7,403	0.88
Democratic	Christopher Gladstone Booth	7,195	0.85
Democratic	George Stevenson	7,023	0.83
Democratic	Curtis Segers	6,064	0.72
Write-in		957	0.11
Total votes		842,883	100.00

=== Republican primary ===
==== Advanced to general election ====
- Jim Hasher, real estate agent, bar owner, and nominee for an at-large seat in the 2023 special election
- Drew Murray, Philadelphia Republican ward leader and nominee for an at-large seat in the 2023 special election

==== Withdrew after primary ====
- Frank Cristinzio
- Gary Grisafi, music teacher
- Mary Jane Kelly

==== Eliminated in primary ====
- Sam Oropeza, real estate professional, mixed martial artist, and nominee for Pennsylvania Senate's 5th district in 2022 special election

==== Declined ====
- David Oh, at-large councilor (2012–2023) (ran for mayor) (endorsed Oropeza)

==== Endorsements ====
Sam Oropeza

Local officials

- David Oh, at-large councilor (2012–present)

Organizations

- Philadelphia Fraternal Order of Police Lodge #5

==== Results ====
Republican primary results
Party	Candidate	Votes	%
Republican	Drew Murray	10,584	18.74
Republican	Frank Cristinzio	10,518	18.62
Republican	Gary Grisafi	9,369	16.59
Republican	Jim Hasher	9,333	16.52
Republican	Mary Jane Kelly	8,751	15.49
Republican	Sam Oropeza	7,527	13.32
Write-in		408	0.72
Total votes		56,490	100.00

=== Working Families Party ===
==== Advanced to general election ====
- Kendra Brooks, incumbent councilor
- Nicolas O’Rourke, director of the Pennsylvania Working Families Party and nominee in 2019

==== Endorsements ====
Kendra Brooks

U.S. senators

- John Fetterman, U.S. senator from Pennsylvania (2023–present) (co-endorsement with O’Rourke)

Statewide officials

- Josh Shapiro, Governor of Pennsylvania (2023–present)

State legislators

- Elizabeth Fiedler, Pennsylvania State Representative from the 184th district (2019–present) (co-endorsement with McIllmurray)
- Rick Krajewski, Pennsylvania State Representative from the 188th district (2021–present)
- Chris Rabb, Pennsylvania State Representative from the 200th district (2017–present)
- Nikil Saval, Pennsylvania State Senator from the 1st district (2021–present) (co-endorsement with Landau and McIllmurray)

Local officials

- Jamie Gauthier, Philadelphia City Councilmember from the 3rd district (2020–present) (co-endorsement with O’Rourke)

Organizations

- Philadelphia Democratic Socialists of America (co-endorsement with McIllmurray and O'Rourke)

Political parties

- Working Families Party (co-endorsement with Almirón, Landau, McIllmurray, O'Rourke, and Thomas)
Nicolas O’Rourke

U.S. senators

- John Fetterman, U.S. senator from Pennsylvania (2023–present) (co-endorsement with Brooks)

Local officials

- Jamie Gauthier, Philadelphia City Councilmember from the 3rd district (2020–present) (co-endorsement with Brooks)

Organizations

- Philadelphia Democratic Socialists of America (co-endorsement with Brooks and McIllmurray)

Political parties

- Working Families Party (co-endorsement with Almirón, Brooks, Landau, McIllmurray, and Thomas)

=== General election ===
==== Results ====
Philadelphia City Council Member At-Large, 2023 general election Vote for 5
Party	Candidate	Votes	%
Democratic	Isaiah Thomas (incumbent)	190,249	16.72%
Democratic	Katherine Gilmore Richardson (incumbent)	183,144	16.09
Democratic	Nina Ahmad	177,654	15.61
Democratic	Rue Landau	170,004	14.94
Democratic	Jim Harrity (incumbent)	148,484	13.05
Working Families	Kendra Brooks (incumbent)	80,807	7.10
Working Families	Nicolas O’Rourke	67,779	5.96
Republican	Jim Hasher	59,243	5.21
Republican	Drew Murray	59,125	5.20
Write-in		1,590	0.14
Total votes		1,138,079 (Note: This number represents the total votes cast in the race, not the total number of people who voted. Because each voter could choose up to five candidates, the number of people who voted in this election is likely far lower. For example, in the concurrent mayoral race, only 305,987 votes were cast.)	100.00
Democratic hold			
Democratic hold			
Democratic hold			
Democratic hold			
Democratic hold			
Working Families hold			
Working Families gain from Republican			
