= 2019 Philadelphia City Council election =

- November 6, 2019

All 17 seats on the Philadelphia City Council 9 seats needed for a majority
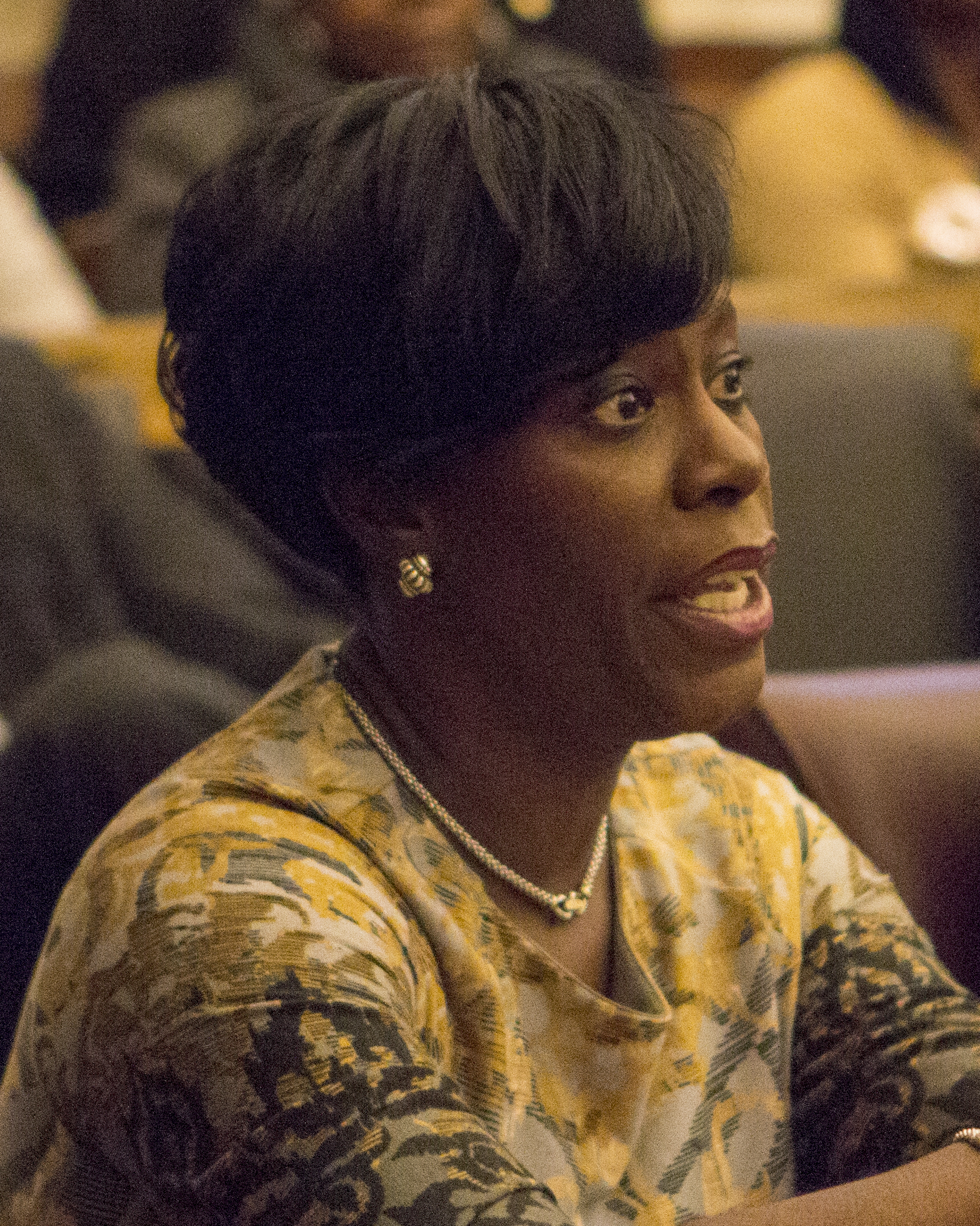

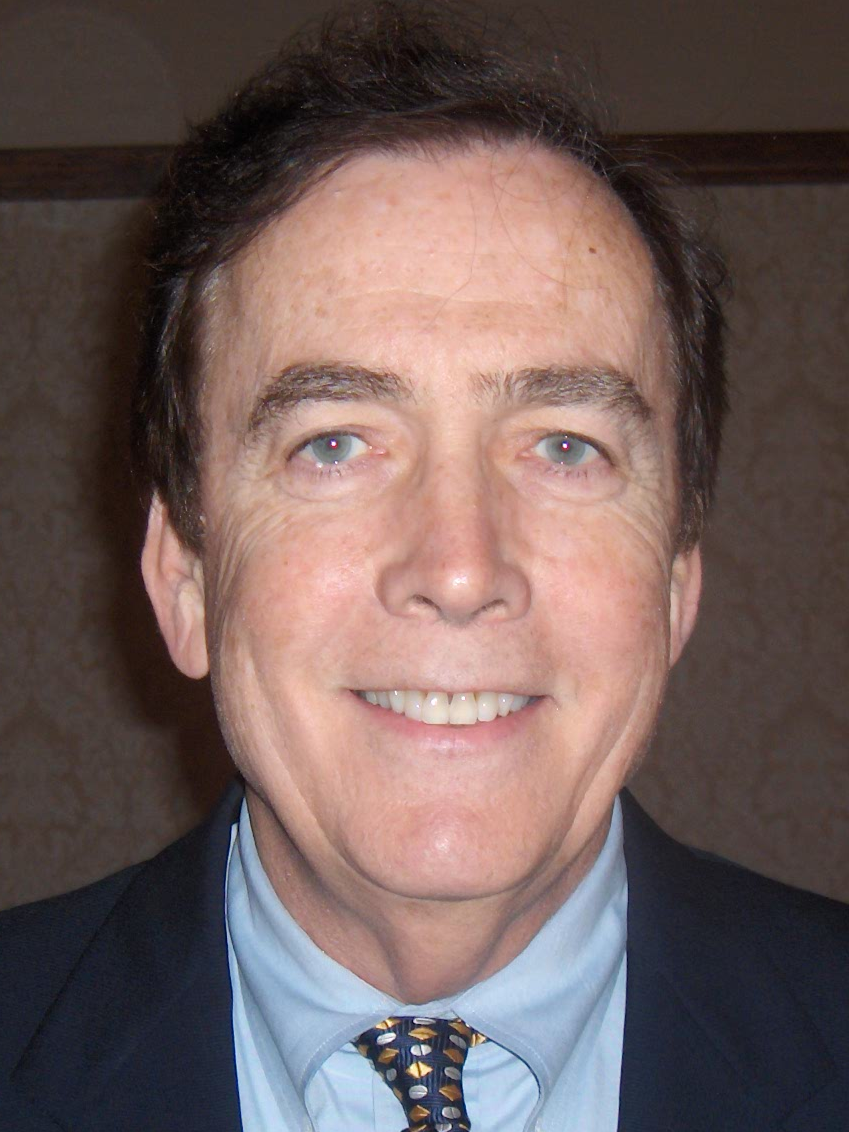

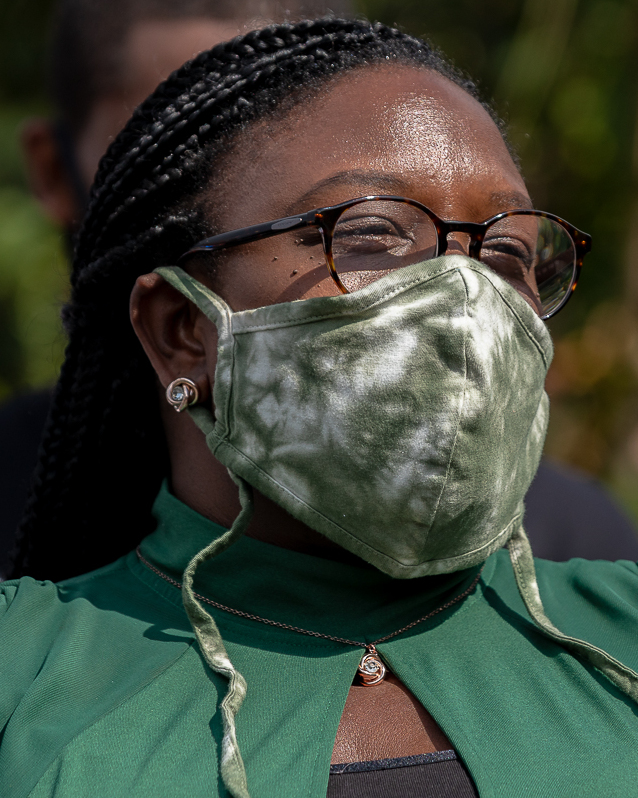
	First party	Second party	Third party
Leader	Cherelle Parker	Brian O'Neill	Kendra Brooks (de facto)
Party	Democratic	Republican	Working Families
Leader's seat	District 9	District 10	Ran for At-Large (won)
Last election	14 seats	3 seats	0 seats
Seats before	14	3	0
Seats won	14	2	1
Seat change	Steady	▼1	▲1
Popular vote	1,027,087	268,371	106,816
Percentage	71.10%	18.58%	7.39%
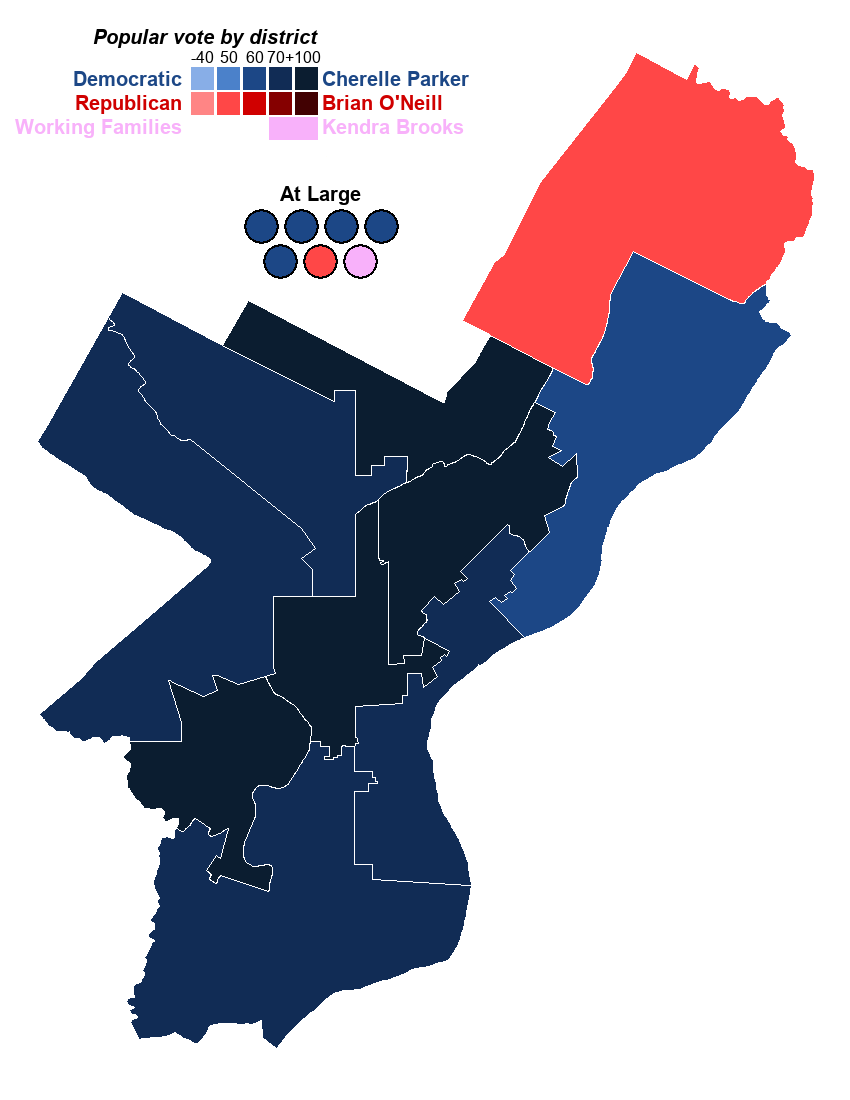
- Map of the general election. District results are shown, with the at-large district also depicted.
Council President before election
Darrell L. Clarke
Democratic
Elected Council President
Darrell L. Clarke
Democratic

The 2019 Philadelphia City Council elections were held on November 6, 2019. They took place on the same day as the 2019 Philadelphia mayoral election, 2019 Philadelphia municipal election, and other local elections in the United States.

== 1st District ==
2019 Philadelphia City Council 1st district election
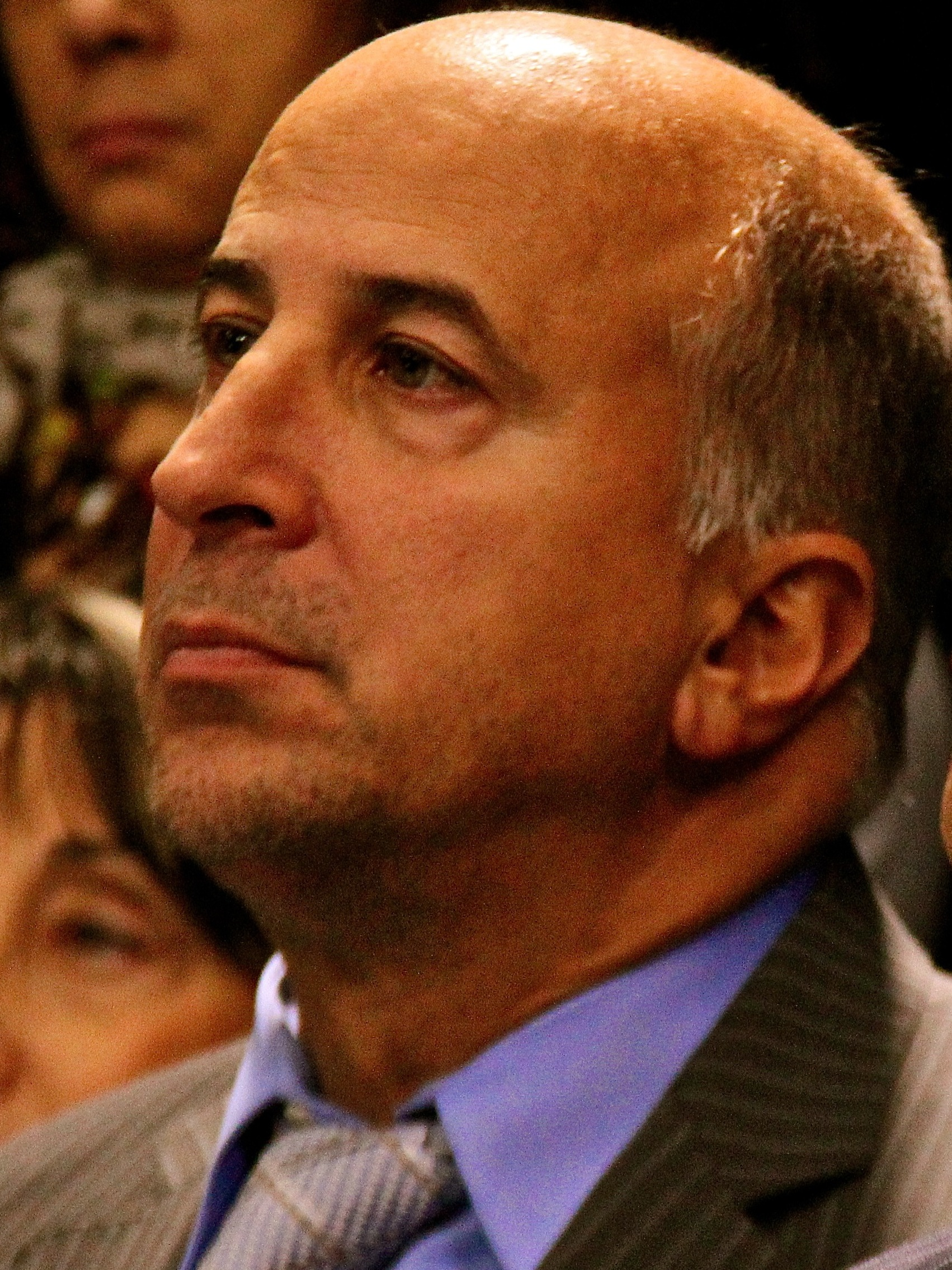

Candidate	Mark Squilla	Daniel Orsino
Party	Democratic	Republican
Popular vote	27,062	5,627
Percentage	82.64%	17.18%
- Results by precinct Squilla: 50–60% 60–70% 70–80% 80–90% >90%
Councilmember before election
Mark Squilla
Democratic
Elected Councilmember
Mark Squilla
Democratic

Incumbent Mark Squilla ran for re-election.

=== Democratic primary ===
==== Nominee ====
- Mark Squilla, incumbent councilor (2012–present)

==== Eliminated in primary ====
- Lou Lanni, police officer and candidate for the 2016 Pennsylvania House of Representatives 182nd district Democratic primary

==== Results ====
Results by precinct Squilla: 50%–60%; 60%–70%; 70%–80%; 80%–90%; 90%–100%; Lanni: 50%–60%

District 1, 2019 Democratic primary
Party	Candidate	Votes	%
Democratic	Mark Squilla (incumbent)	16,785	81.37
Democratic	Lou Lanni	3,830	18.57
Write-in		13	0.06
Total votes		20,628	100.00

=== Republican primary ===
==== Nominee ====
- Daniel Orsino, former orthotics manufacturer

==== Results ====
District 1, 2019 Republican primary
Party	Candidate	Votes	%
Republican	Daniel Orsino	2,020	99.90
Write-in		2	0.10
Total votes		2,022	100.00

=== General election ===
==== Results ====
District 1, 2019 general election
Party	Candidate	Votes	%
Democratic	Mark Squilla (incumbent)	27,062	82.64
Republican	Daniel Orsino	5,627	17.18
Write-in		56	0.17
Total votes		32,745	100.00
Democratic hold			

== 2nd District ==
2019 Philadelphia City Council 2nd district election
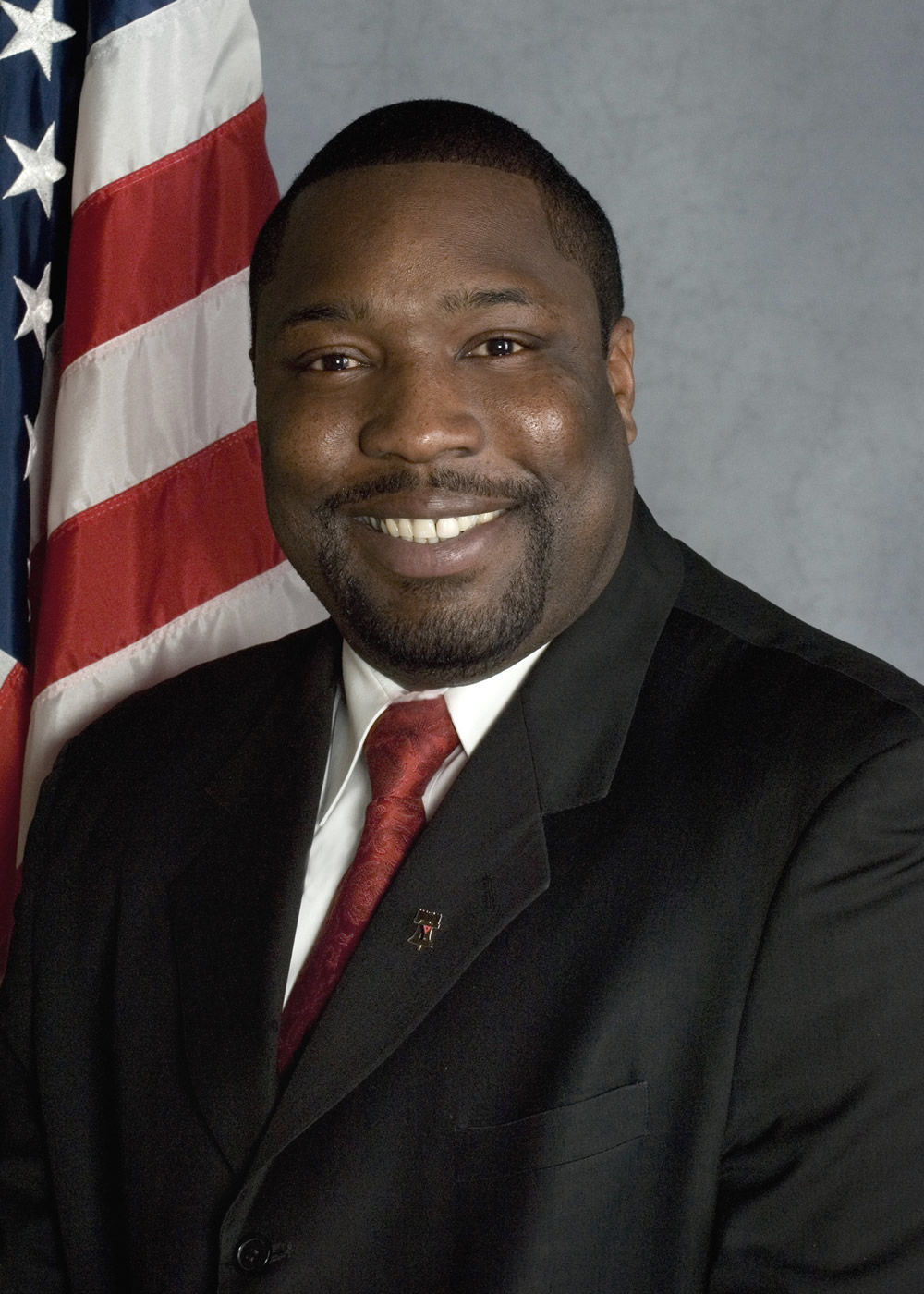

Candidate	Kenyatta Johnson	Michael Bradley
Party	Democratic	Republican
Popular vote	23,931	6,004
Percentage	78.95%	19.81%
- Results by precinct Johnson: 50–60% 60–70% 70–80% 80–90% >90% Bradley: 50–60% 60–70% 70–80%
Councilmember before election
Kenyatta Johnson
Democratic
Elected Councilmember
Kenyatta Johnson
Democratic

Incumbent Kenyatta Johnson ran for re-election.

=== Democratic primary ===
==== Nominee ====
- Kenyatta Johnson, incumbent councilor (2012–present)

==== Eliminated in primary ====
- Lauren Vidas, lawyer and former City Council legislative aide

==== Results ====
Results by precinct Johnson: 50%–60%; 60%–70%; 70%–80%; 80%–90%; 90%–100%; Vidas: 50%–60%; 60%–70%; 70%–80%

District 2, 2019 Democratic primary
Party	Candidate	Votes	%
Democratic	Kenyatta Johnson (incumbent)	13,358	59.75
Democratic	Lauren Vidas	8,995	40.23
Write-in		5	0.02
Total votes		22,358	100.00

=== Republican primary ===
==== Nominee ====
- Michael Bradley, construction manager and United States Army veteran

==== Results ====
District 2, 2019 Republican primary
Party	Candidate	Votes	%
Republican	Michael Bradley	1,445	99.79
Write-in		3	0.21
Total votes		1,448	100.00

=== General election ===
==== Results ====
District 2, 2019 general election
Party	Candidate	Votes	%
Democratic	Kenyatta Johnson (incumbent)	23,931	78.95
Republican	Michael Bradley	6,004	19.81
Write-in		378	1.25
Total votes		30,313	100.00
Democratic hold			

== 3rd District ==
Incumbent Jannie Blackwell ran for re-election and was defeated in the Democratic primary by Jamie Gauthier, who ran unopposed in the general election.

=== Democratic primary ===
==== Nominee ====
- Jamie Gauthier, former executive director of the Fairmount Park Conservancy

==== Eliminated in primary ====
- Jannie Blackwell, incumbent councilor (1992–present)

==== Results ====
Results by precinct Gauthier: 40%–50%; 50%–60%; 60%–70%; 70%–80%; 80%–90%; 90%–100%; Blackwell: 50%–60%; 60%–70%; 70%–80%; Tie: 50%

District 3, 2019 Democratic primary
Party	Candidate	Votes	%
Democratic	Jamie Gauthier	13,460	55.86
Democratic	Jannie Blackwell (incumbent)	10,588	43.94
Write-in		48	0.20
Total votes		24,096	100.00

=== Republican primary ===
==== Results ====
District 3, 2019 Republican primary
Party	Candidate	Votes	%
	Write-in	10	100.00
Total votes		10	100.00

=== General election ===
==== Results ====
District 3, 2019 general election
Party	Candidate	Votes	%
Democratic	Jamie Gauthier	27,214	99.78
Write-in		61	0.22
Total votes		27,275	100.00
Democratic hold			

== 4th District ==
2019 Philadelphia City Council 4th district election
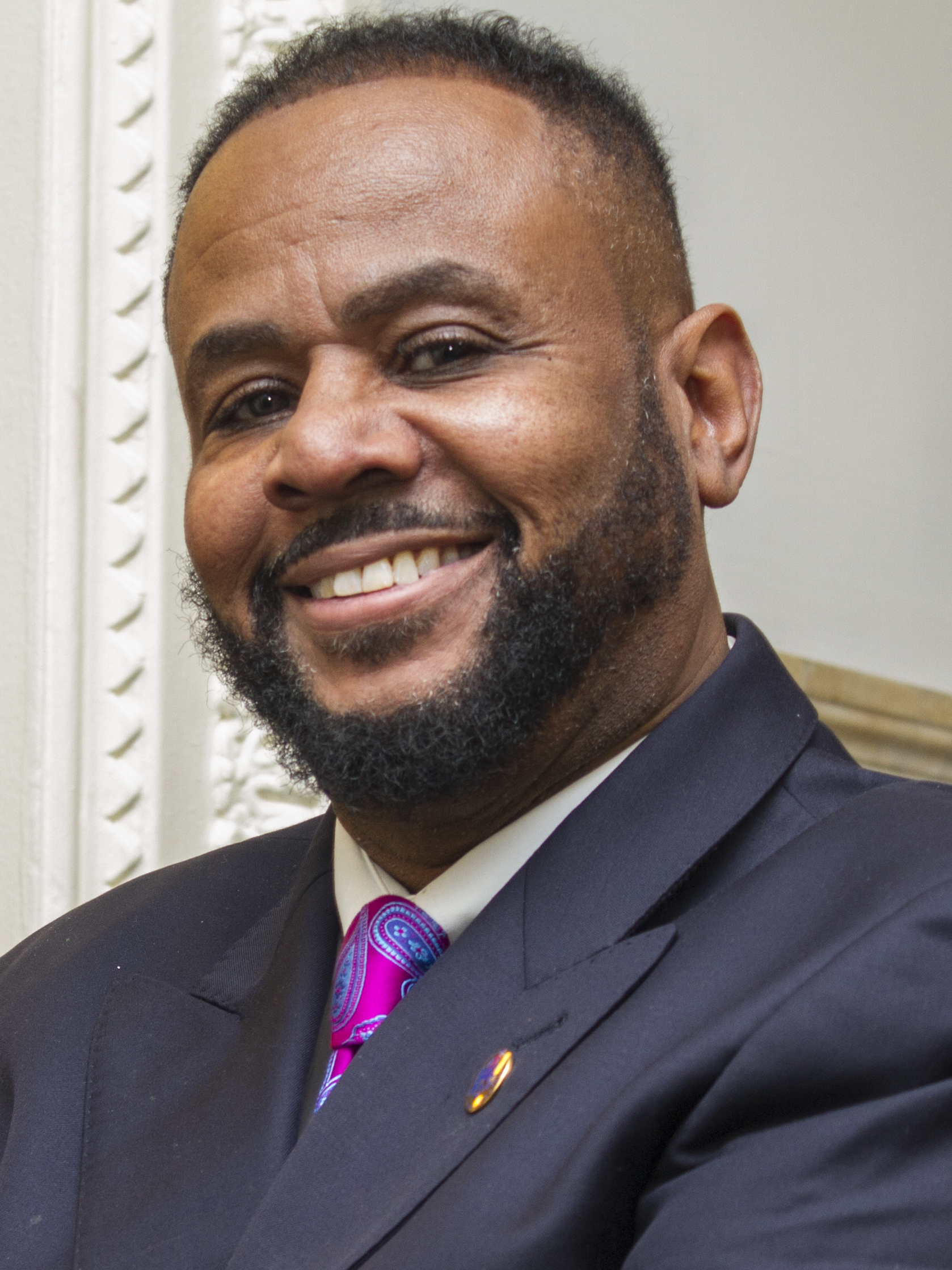

Candidate	Curtis Jones Jr.	Karla Cruel
Party	Democratic	Independent
Popular vote	27,041	2,461
Percentage	88.63%	8.07%
- Results by precinct Jones: 60–70% 70–80% 80–90% >90%
Councilmember before election
Curtis Jones Jr.
Democratic
Elected Councilmember
Curtis Jones Jr.
Democratic

Incumbent Curtis Jones Jr. ran for re-election.

=== Democratic primary ===
==== Nominee ====
- Curtis Jones Jr., incumbent councilor (2008–present)

==== Eliminated in primary ====
- Ron Adams, High Intensity Drug Trafficking Area program operations manager

==== Results ====
Results by precinct Jones: 50%–60%; 60%–70%; 70%–80%; 80%–90%; 90%–100%; Adams: 40%–50%; 50%–60%

District 4, 2019 Democratic primary
Party	Candidate	Votes	%
Democratic	Curtis Jones Jr. (incumbent)	16,042	74.04
Democratic	Ron Adams	5,588	25.79
Write-in		38	0.18
Total votes		21,668	100.00

=== Republican primary ===
==== Results ====
District 4, 2019 Republican primary
Party	Candidate	Votes	%
	Write-in	10	100.00
Total votes		10	100.00

=== General election ===
==== Results ====
District 4, 2019 general election
Party	Candidate	Votes	%
Democratic	Curtis Jones Jr. (incumbent)	27,041	88.63
Independent	Karla Cruel	2,461	8.07
Libertarian	Matt Baltsar	984	3.23
Write-in		25	0.08
Total votes		30,511	100.00
Democratic hold			

== 5th District ==
Incumbent Darrell L. Clarke ran for re-election unopposed.

=== Democratic primary ===
==== Nominee ====
- Darrell L. Clarke, incumbent councilor (1999–present)

==== Results ====
District 5, 2019 Democratic primary
Party	Candidate	Votes	%
Democratic	Darrell L. Clarke (incumbent)	18,011	99.50
Write-in		91	0.50
Total votes		18,102	100.00

=== Republican primary ===
==== Results ====
District 5, 2019 Republican primary
Party	Candidate	Votes	%
	Write-in	8	100.00
Total votes		8	100.00

=== General election ===
==== Results ====
District 5, 2019 general election
Party	Candidate	Votes	%
Democratic	Darrell L. Clarke (incumbent)	27,768	98.92
Write-in		302	1.08
Total votes		28,070	100.00
Democratic hold			

== 6th District ==
2019 Philadelphia City Council 6th district election
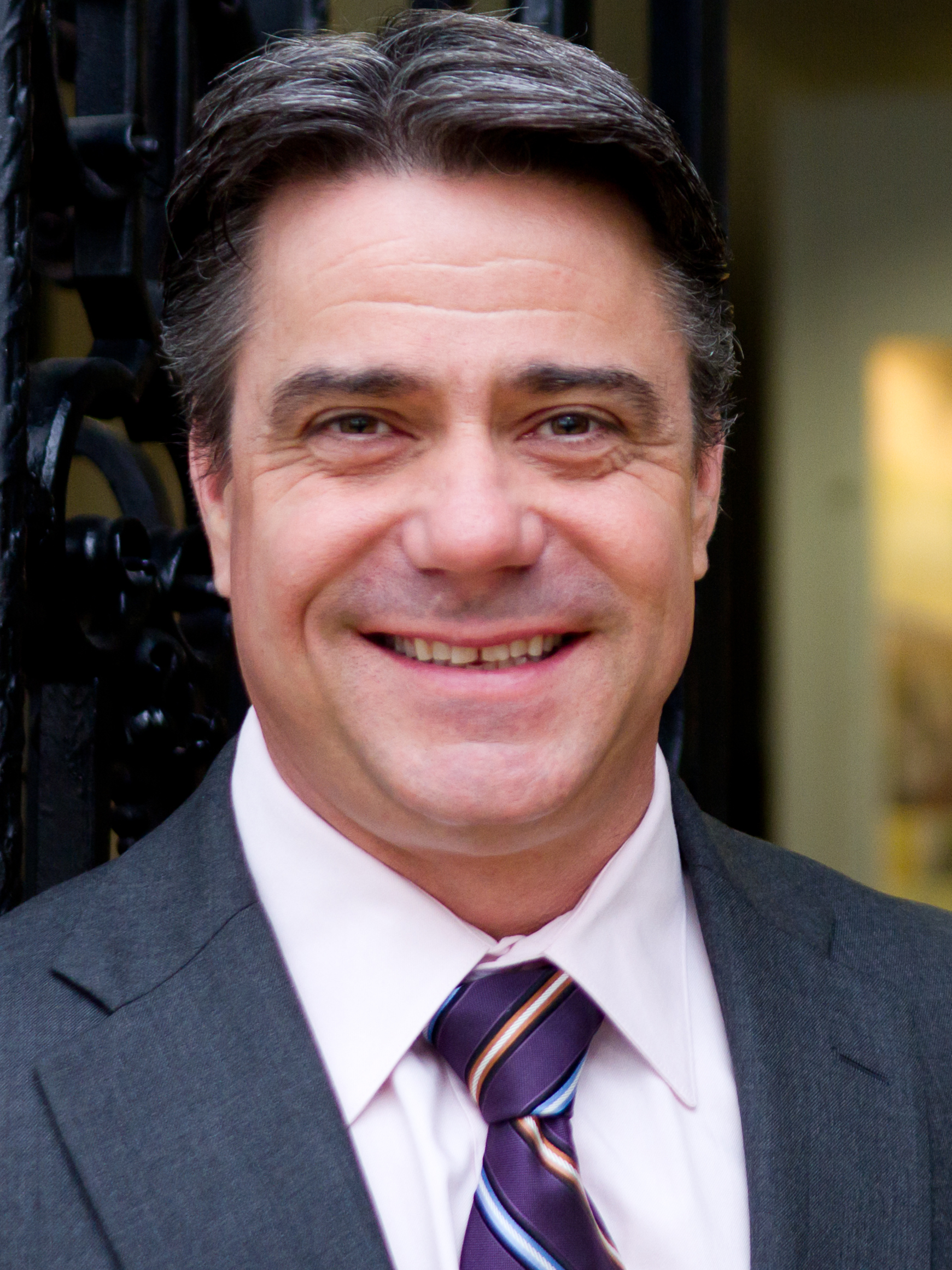

Candidate	Bobby Henon	Pete Smith
Party	Democratic	Republican
Popular vote	12,910	8,408
Percentage	60.52%	39.41%
- Results by precinct Henon: 50–60% 60–70% 70–80% 80–90% Smith: 50–60% 60–70% Tie: 50%
Councilmember before election
Bobby Henon
Democratic
Elected Councilmember
Bobby Henon
Democratic

Incumbent Bobby Henon ran for re-election.

=== Democratic primary ===
==== Nominee ====
- Bobby Henon, incumbent councilor (2012–present)

==== Results ====
District 6, 2019 Democratic primary
Party	Candidate	Votes	%
Democratic	Bobby Henon (incumbent)	7,390	99.74
Write-in		19	0.26
Total votes		7,409	100.00

=== Republican primary ===
==== Nominee ====
- Pete Smith, president of the Tacony Civic Association

==== Results ====
District 6, 2019 Republican primary
Party	Candidate	Votes	%
Republican	Pete Smith	3,166	99.97
Write-in		1	0.03
Total votes		3,167	100.00

=== General election ===
==== Results ====
District 6, 2019 general election
Party	Candidate	Votes	%
Democratic	Bobby Henon (incumbent)	12,910	60.52
Republican	Pete Smith	8,408	39.41
Write-in		14	0.07
Total votes		21,332	100.00
Democratic hold			

== 7th District ==
Incumbent Maria Quiñones-Sánchez ran for re-election.

=== Democratic primary ===
==== Nominee ====
- Maria Quiñones-Sánchez, incumbent councilor (2008–present)

==== Eliminated in primary ====
- Angel Cruz, member of the Pennsylvania House of Representatives (2001–present)

==== Results ====
Results by precinct Quiñones-Sánchez: 50%–60%; 60%–70%; 70%–80%; 80%–90%; Cruz: 50%–60%; 60%–70%; 70%–80%; Tie: 50%

District 7, 2019 Democratic primary
Party	Candidate	Votes	%
Democratic	Maria Quiñones-Sánchez (incumbent)	6,139	52.05
Democratic	Angel Cruz	5,653	47.93
Write-in		3	0.03
Total votes		11,795	100.00

=== Republican primary ===
==== Results ====
District 7, 2019 Republican primary
Party	Candidate	Votes	%
	Write-in	7	100.00
Total votes		7	100.00

=== General election ===
==== Results ====
District 7, 2019 general election
Party	Candidate	Votes	%
Democratic	Maria Quiñones-Sánchez (incumbent)	12,647	99.58
Write-in		53	0.42
Total votes		12,700	100.00
Democratic hold			

== 8th District ==
2019 Philadelphia City Council 8th district election
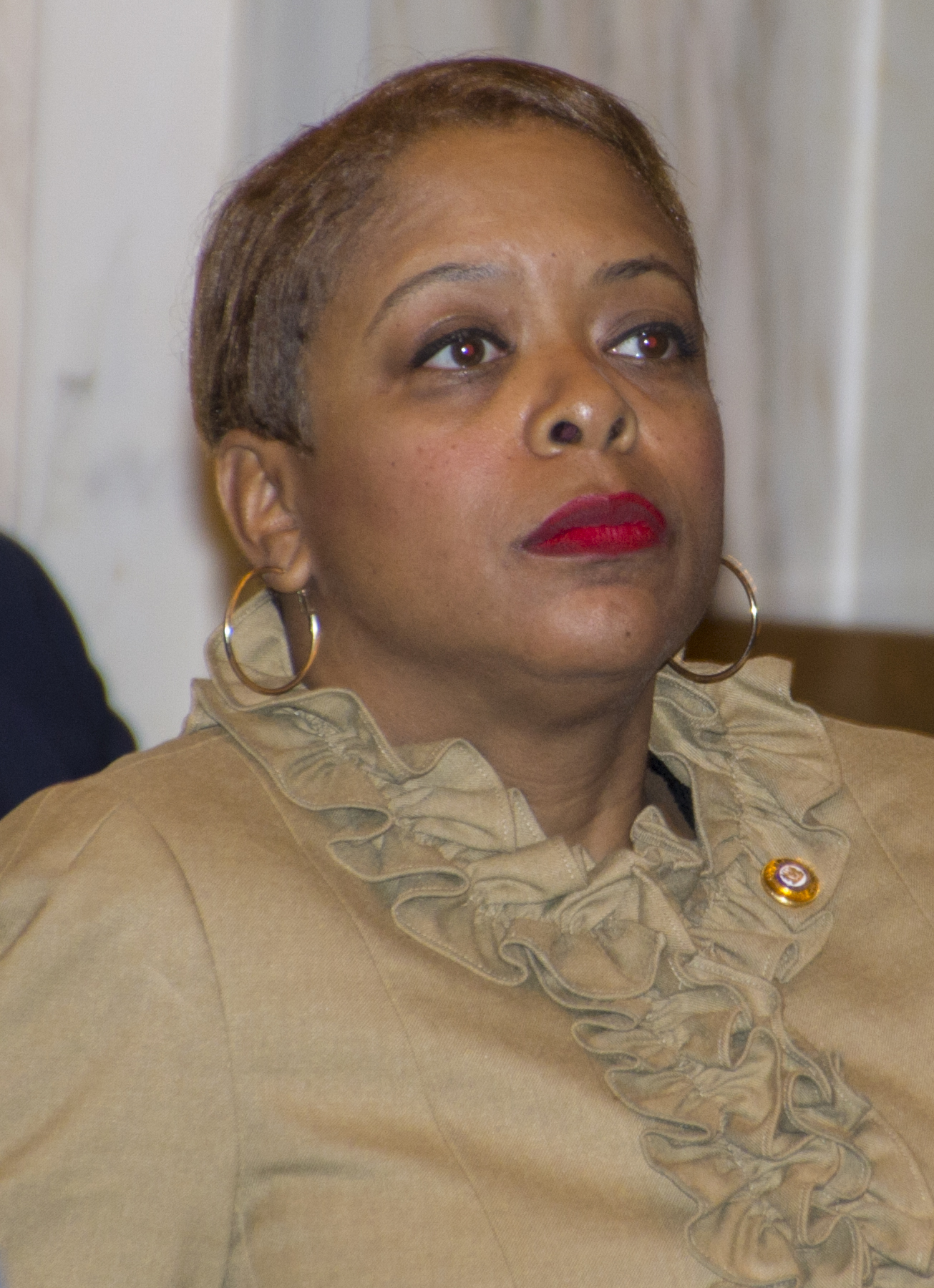

Candidate	Cindy Bass	Greg Paulmier
Party	Democratic	Independent
Popular vote	27,678	6,465
Percentage	80.87%	18.89%
- Results by precinct Bass: 40–50% 50–60% 60–70% 70–80% 80–90% >90% Paulmier: 50–60%
Councilmember before election
Cindy Bass
Democratic
Elected Councilmember
Cindy Bass
Democratic

Incumbent Cindy Bass ran unopposed for re-election.

=== Democratic primary ===
==== Nominee ====
- Cindy Bass, incumbent councilor (2012–present)

==== Disqualified ====
- Tonya Bah

==== Results ====
District 8, 2019 Democratic primary
Party	Candidate	Votes	%
Democratic	Cindy Bass (incumbent)	21,642	98.09
Write-in		422	1.91
Total votes		22,064	100.00

=== Republican primary ===
==== Results ====
District 8, 2019 Republican primary
Party	Candidate	Votes	%
	Write-in	13	100.00
Total votes		13	100.00

=== General election ===
==== Results ====
District 8, 2019 general election
Party	Candidate	Votes	%
Democratic	Cindy Bass (incumbent)	27,678	80.87
Independent	Greg Paulmier	6,465	18.89
Write-in		82	0.24
Total votes		34,225	100.00
Democratic hold			

== 9th District ==
Incumbent Cherelle Parker ran unopposed for re-election.

=== Democratic primary ===
==== Nominee ====
- Cherelle Parker, incumbent councilor (2016–present)

==== Results ====
District 9, 2019 Democratic primary
Party	Candidate	Votes	%
Democratic	Cherelle Parker (incumbent)	18,623	99.96
Write-in		7	0.04
Total votes		18,630	100.00

=== Republican primary ===
==== Results ====
District 9, 2019 Republican primary
Party	Candidate	Votes	%
	Write-in	6	100.00
Total votes		6	100.00

=== General election ===
==== Results ====
District 9, 2019 general election
Party	Candidate	Votes	%
Democratic	Cherelle Parker (incumbent)	26,910	99.89
Write-in		29	0.11
Total votes		26,939	100.00
Democratic hold			

== 10th District ==
2019 Philadelphia City Council 10th district election
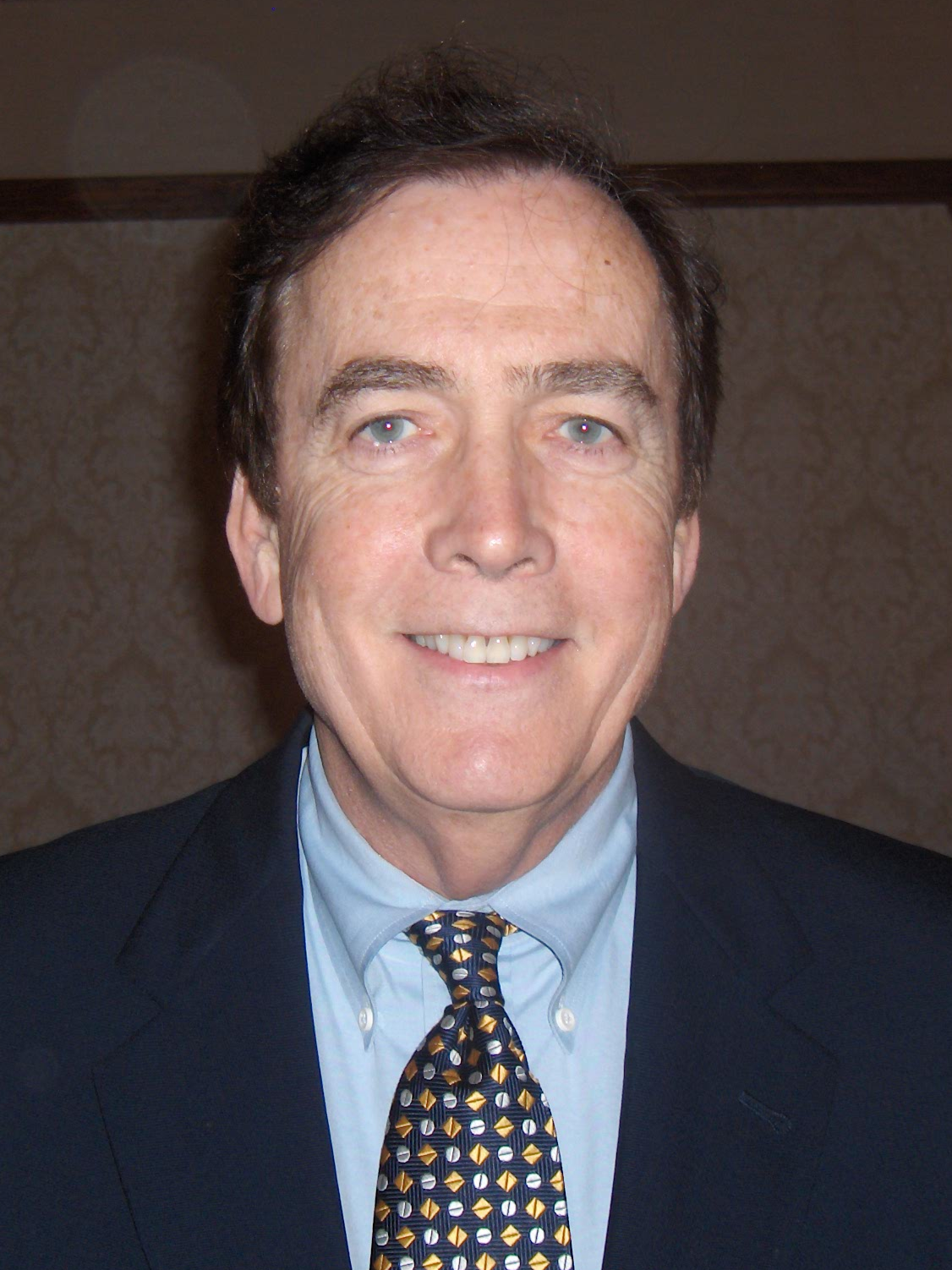

Candidate	Brian J. O'Neill	Judy Moore
Party	Republican	Democratic
Popular vote	16,183	13,235
Percentage	54.98%	44.97%
- Results by precinct O'Neill: 50–60% 60–70% 70–80% 80–90% Moore: 50–60% 60–70% 70–80% Tie: 50%
Councilmember before election
Brian J. O'Neill
Republican
Elected Councilmember
Brian J. O'Neill
Republican

Incumbent Brian J. O'Neill ran for re-election.

=== Democratic primary ===
==== Nominee ====
- Judy Moore, executive vice president of the Garces Group

==== Results ====
District 10, 2019 Democratic primary
Party	Candidate	Votes	%
Democratic	Judy Moore	7,762	99.91
Write-in		7	0.09
Total votes		7,769	100.00

=== Republican primary ===
==== Nominee ====
- Brian J. O'Neill, incumbent councilor (1980–present)

==== Results ====
District 10, 2019 Republican primary
Party	Candidate	Votes	%
Republican	Brian J. O'Neill (incumbent)	5,543	99.98
Write-in		1	0.02
Total votes		5,544	100.00

=== General election ===
==== Results ====
District 10, 2019 general election
Party	Candidate	Votes	%
Republican	Brian J. O'Neill (incumbent)	16,183	54.98
Democratic	Judy Moore	13,235	44.97
Write-in		15	0.08
Total votes		29,433	100.00
Republican hold			

== At-Large Seats ==
Philadelphia City Council has seven at-large seats, two of which must be represented by a minority party. Each party may nominate five candidates for the general election. Voters can select up to five candidates in both the primary and general.

For the first time since the city charter's ratification in 1951, a candidate from neither the Democratic nor Republican Party won an at-large seat, with Kendra Brooks of the Working Families Party unseating Al Taubenberger.

=== Democratic primary ===
==== Advanced to general election ====
- Allan Domb, incumbent councilor (2016–present)
- Derek S. Green, incumbent councilor (2016–present)
- Helen Gym, incumbent councilor (2016–present)
- Katherine Gilmore Richardson, chief of staff to councilor Blondell Reynolds Brown
- Isaiah Thomas, educator and former City Controller staffer

==== Eliminated in primary ====
- Fareed Abdullah, teacher
- Wayne Allen, drug and alcohol counselor
- Erika Almirón, immigrant rights activist
- Deja Lynn Alvarez, member of the Mayor’s Commission on LGBT Affairs
- Ethelind Baylor, vice president of AFSCME DC 47
- Vinny Black
- Latrice Y. Bryant, Philadelphia city government staffer
- Devon Cade
- Bobbie Curry, perennial candidate
- Justin DiBerardinis, legislative director for councilor Maria Quiñones-Sánchez
- Joseph A. Diorio, attorney
- Wayne Edmund Dorsey
- Beth Finn, political organizer
- Sandra Dungee Glenn, former chair of the School Reform Commission
- Ogbonna "Paul" Hagins, activist
- Asa Khalif, activist
- Adrian Rivera-Reyes, postdoctoral fellow at the University of Pennsylvania
- Mark Ross, political organizer
- Edwin Santana, entrepreneur and special education teacher
- Eryn Santamoor, financial and political consultant
- Billy Thompson, pastor and musician
- Fernando Treviño, political consultant
- Hena Veit, forensic mitigation specialist

==== Results ====
Philadelphia City Council At-Large, Democratic primary
Party	Candidate	Votes	%
Democratic	Helen Gym (incumbent)	108,604	16.16
Democratic	Allan Domb (incumbent)	67,193	10.00
Democratic	Isaiah Thomas	64,045	9.53
Democratic	Derek S. Green (incumbent)	61,070	9.09
Democratic	Katherine Gilmore Richardson	45,470	6.77
Democratic	Justin DiBerardinis	42,643	6.35
Democratic	Adrian Rivera-Reyes	35,565	5.29
Democratic	Eryn Santamoor	35,026	5.21
Democratic	Erika Almirón	34,329	5.11
Democratic	Deja Lynn Alvarez	26,617	3.96
Democratic	Sandra Dungee Glenn	18,105	2.69
Democratic	Ethelind Baylor	14,259	2.12
Democratic	Beth Finn	14,015	2.09
Democratic	Ogbonna "Paul" Hagins	12,570	1.87
Democratic	Fernando Treviño	11,646	1.73
Democratic	Fareed Abdullah	10,676	1.59
Democratic	Asa Khalif	9,779	1.46
Democratic	Billy Thompson	9,166	1.36
Democratic	Latrice Y. Bryant	8,966	1.33
Democratic	Joseph A. Diorio	7,803	1.16
Democratic	Hana Veit	5,474	0.81
Democratic	Edwin Santana	5,272	0.78
Democratic	Wayne Allen	4,941	0.74
Democratic	Vinny Black	4,516	0.67
Democratic	Mark Ross	4,255	0.63
Democratic	Bobbie Curry	3,920	0.58
Democratic	Devon Cade	2,854	0.42
Democratic	Wayne Edmund Dorsey	2,780	0.41
Write-in		316	0.05
Total votes		671,875	100.00

=== Republican primary ===
==== Advanced to general election ====
- Bill Heeney, businessman and Republican ward leader
- David Oh, incumbent councilor (2012–present)
- Al Taubenberger, incumbent councilor (2016–present)
- Dan Tinney, Republican candidate for City Council member at-large in 2015
- Matt Wolfe, Republican candidate for City Council member at-large in 2015

==== Eliminated in primary ====
- Irina M. Goldstein
- Drew Murray, community organizer

==== Results ====
Philadelphia City Council At-Large, Republican primary
Party	Candidate	Votes	%
Republican	Dan Tinney	13,611	21.02
Republican	Al Taubenberger (incumbent)	12,542	19.37
Republican	Matt Wolfe	12,362	19.09
Republican	Bill Heeney	11,976	18.50
Republican	David Oh (incumbent)	6,477	10.00
Republican	Drew Murray	3,935	6.08
Republican	Irina M. Goldstein	3,790	5.85
Write-in		54	0.08
Total votes		64,747	100.00

=== Working Families Party ===
==== Advanced to general election ====
- Kendra Brooks, neighborhood and educational activist
- Nicolas O'Rourke, pastor

=== General election ===
==== Results ====
Philadelphia City Council Member At-Large, 2019 general election Vote for 5
Party	Candidate	Votes	%
Democratic	Helen Gym (incumbent)	205,661	15.36
Democratic	Isaiah Thomas	196,733	14.69
Democratic	Derek S. Green (incumbent)	189,819	14.18
Democratic	Katherine Gilmore Richardson	189,813	14.18
Democratic	Allan Domb (incumbent)	186,665	13.94
Working Families	Kendra Brooks	60,256	4.50
Republican	David Oh (incumbent)	53,742	4.01
Republican	Al Taubenberger (incumbent)	47,547	3.55
Working Families	Nicolas O’Rourke	46,560	3.48
Republican	Dan Tinney	46,270	3.46
Republican	Bill Heeney	43,249	3.23
Republican	Matt Wolfe	41,341	3.09
Independent	Sherrie Cohen	9,116	0.68
Independent	Joe Cox	8,880	0.66
Libertarian	Maj Toure	6,179	0.46
Independent	Steve Cherniavsky	3,480	0.26
Independent	Clarc King	2,959	0.22
Write-in		745	0.06
Total votes		1,339,015	100.00
Democratic hold			
Democratic hold			
Democratic hold			
Democratic hold			
Democratic hold			
Working Families gain from Republican			
Republican hold			
