= Rue Landau =

American politician and activist

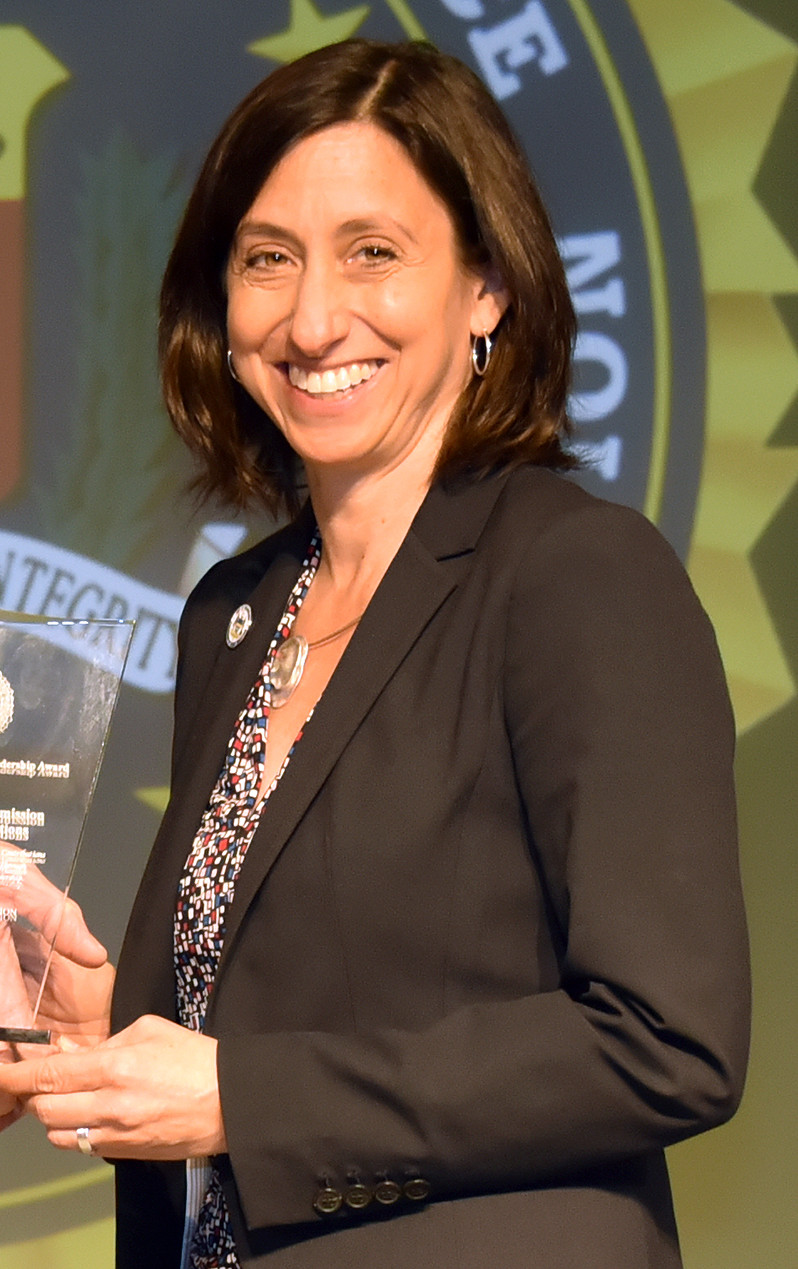

Member of the Philadelphia City Council from At-Large
- Incumbent
- Assumed office January 1, 2024

Personal details
- Born: February 20, 1969 (age 57) Cheltenham Township, Pennsylvania
- Spouse: Kerry Smith (m. 2014)
- Children: 1
- Education: University of Delaware; Temple University Beasley School of Law
- Website: Campaign

Ruthellen "Rue" Landau (born February 20, 1969) is an American politician and activist. She is a member of the Philadelphia City Council from At-Large after winning one of the seven At Large Seats in the 2023 election. She is the first openly LGBT person elected to the Philadelphia City Council.

== Early life and education ==
Landau was born on February 20, 1969, in Cheltenham Township, Pennsylvania to Myron "Mike" and Dorothy "Dosty" Landau along with her identical twin sister, Suzanne. She also has an older brother named Rich. Landau is Jewish and grew up with one parent from a Conservative background and one parent from a Reform background. She attended the University of Delaware where she had first came out. She decided to move to the Gayborhood in Philadelphia. She volunteered with ACT UP, an AIDS activist organization and then also with the Kensington Welfare Rights Union, a housing activists group. She decided to go to Law School at the Temple University Beasley School of Law and serve as a housing activist.

== Pre-political career ==
After graduating from Temple, she spent a decade at Community Legal Services to help prevent Philadelphians in cases of evictions and to help locate housings for families. She was then appointed as the director of the Commission on Human Relations, as well as the Commission of the Fair Housing Commission for the City of Philadelphia. She challenged local government like the Philadelphia Housing Authority to create fairer laws and conditions for Philadelphia families.

She served as a Committeeperson in the Second Ward for the Democratic Party of Philadelphia.

== Political career ==
On December 13, 2022, Landau officially announced her bid for an at-large seat in the 2023 Philadelphia City Council election. She was endorsed by the Democratic Party of Philadelphia, Working Families Party, and Reclaim Philadelphia. Landau won one of the nominations, winning the most votes from a non-incumbent and also received more votes than Incumbent Jim Haritty. After placing fourth and winning a seat in the general election, Landau became the first openly LGTBQ Councilmember in Philadelphia City Council.

== Personal life ==
Landau met Kerry Smith, who lived in Boston at the time, in 2002 and they dated and became a couple. Landau met Smith thanks to a mutual friend living in New York City in 2002. Landau and Kerry would become the first couple in Pennsylvania to receive a same-sex marriage license when it became legal on May 20, 2014. Rue and Kerry have a son, Eli, who goes to Central High School. They currently live in Bella Vista near Rue's two siblings. Landau practices Reconstructionist Judaism and is a member of Kol Tzedek.

Landau is credited with expanding Philadelphia's motto to be more inclusive, coining the phrase: “City of Brotherly Love, Sisterly Affection, and Sibling Solidarity.” This updated version includes nonbinary and gender nonconforming individuals.
