= Nicolas O'Rourke =

American politician

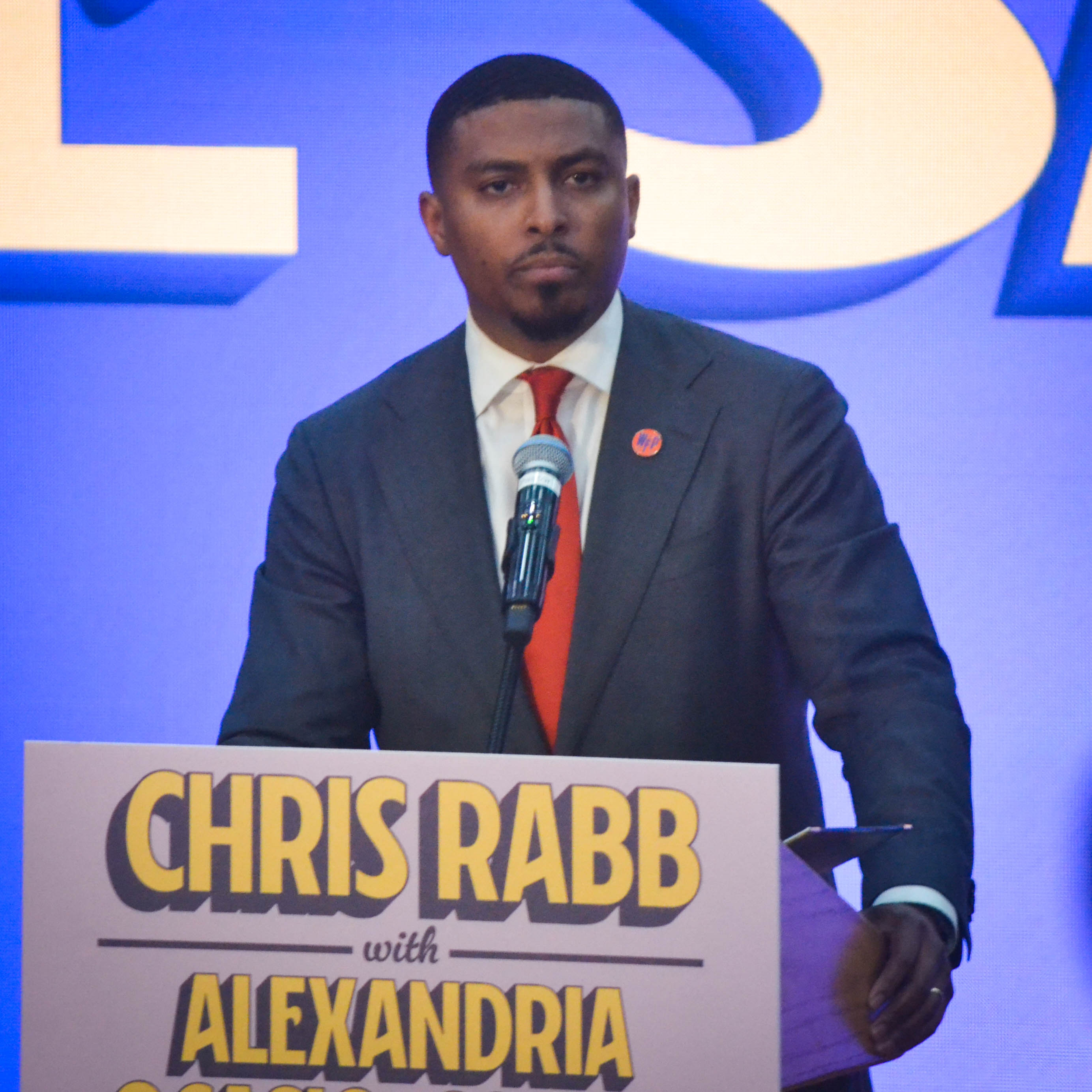
- O'Rourke in 2026

Minority Whip of the Philadelphia City Council
- Incumbent
- Assumed office January 1, 2024
- Preceded by: David Oh

Member of the Philadelphia City Council from the at-large district
- Incumbent
- Assumed office January 1, 2024
- Preceded by: David Oh

Personal details
- Born: 1989 (age 36–37) Trenton, New Jersey, U.S.
- Party: Working Families
- Children: 1
- Education: Central State University; Lancaster Bible College (Bachelor's Degree)

Nicolas V. O'Rourke is an American politician and pastor who is an at-large member on the Philadelphia City Council. In 2023, he was elected to a minority party seat alongside incumbent Kendra Brooks in his second run for council as a member of the Working Families Party. This caused Republicans to not have any at-large seats on the City Council for the first time since 1952, when the current system was established.

== Early life and education ==
O'Rourke was born in 1989 in Trenton, New Jersey and lived in Ohio, Florida, and Indiana before moving to Philadelphia. He attended Central State University and Lancaster Bible College, before becoming the pastor of the Living Water United Church of Christ in Oxford Circle in 2014.

== Political career ==
In the 2019 Philadelphia City Council election, O'Rouke ran for a minority at-large seat but placed 9th on the general ballot. After his defeat, he became the Pennsylvania Director of the Working Families Party. O'Rouke won an election for a minority at-large seat in the 2023 Philadelphia City Council election alongside Kendra Brooks, ousting Republicans from the minority seats. He took office on January 1, 2024.
