= Isaiah Thomas (politician) =

American politician (born 1984)

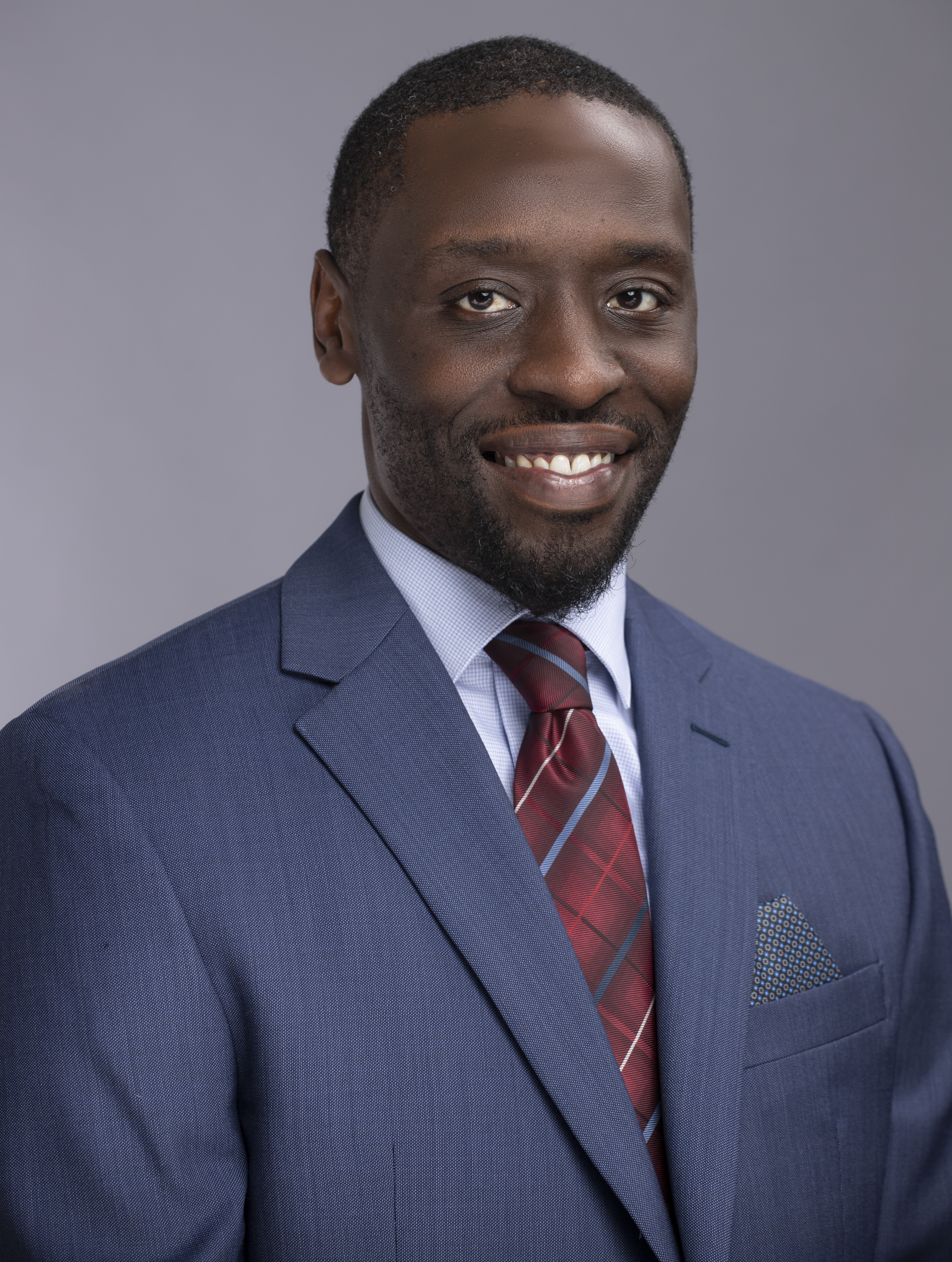

Member of the Philadelphia City Council from the at-large district
- Incumbent
- Assumed office January 1, 2020
- Preceded by: William K. Greenlee

Personal details
- Born: July 3, 1984 (age 42)
- Party: Democratic
- Children: 3
- Education: Pennsylvania State University (BA); Lincoln University (MEd)
- Website: Official website

Isaiah Thomas Sr. (born 3 July 1984) is a Democratic politician and At-Large member of Philadelphia City Council. He was born to a family of 10 children from the East Oak Lane neighborhood of Philadelphia. He attended Frankford High School, Pennsylvania State University and Lincoln University. He was first elected to an At-Large seat on Philadelphia City Council in 2019. Thomas was re-elected to a second term with the highest votes in the 2023 primary and general elections. He assumed office January 2, 2024 and was elected by fellow members to serve as Majority Whip.

== Personal life ==
Thomas is one of 10 children born to parents Barry, an educator and coach and Veronica, president of the deaconess board of Triumph Baptist Church. He grew up in Philadelphia and attended Frankford High School. During his freshman year in high school he started working for the Philadelphia Freedom Schools program during the summer. He graduated from Penn State in 2007 with a degree in sociology and social behavior and obtained a master's in education from Lincoln University. He worked part time in the office of State Representative Tony Payton between 2009 and 2010. He also worked as a coach and Associate Dean of Students at Sankofa Freedom Academy Charter and became executive director of Philadelphia Freedom Schools. From 2012 to 2015 he was an adjunct professor in the Human Studies department at Lincoln University. In 2015 he started the Thomas and Woods Foundation with District 1199C Vice President Chris Woods. From July 2015 to 2018 he worked as the director of community affairs in the Philadelphia City Controller's office under Alan Butkovitz.

== Political career ==
While working at Philadelphia Freedom Schools, Thomas witnessed the negative effects of education cuts by former Pennsylvania Governor Tom Corbett and credited this experience as one of the reasons he became politically involved. His first job in politics was working as a Legislative Assistant for former State Representative Tony Payton. He was mentored by Tony Payton, Payton's chief of staff Jorge Santana, 1199C president Henry Nicholas and State Representative Isabella Fitzgerald.

In 2011 at age 26, Thomas ran unsuccessfully in the Democratic primary for City Council At-Large. He placed 8th in a field of 14 candidates, winning 31,515 votes.

In 2014 Thomas was elected as a Democratic Committeeperson in Ward 10, Division 11.

In 2015, Thomas again ran unsuccessfully in the Democratic primary City Council At-Large, this time only narrowly defeated. He received endorsements from The Philadelphia Inquirer editorial board, former mayor John F. Street, Councilmembers Curtis J. Jones Jr. and Maria Quiñones-Sánchez, City Controller Alan Butkovitz and several labor unions. He placed 6th in a field of 20 candidates, where the top five candidates advance to the general election. He received 48,000 votes and was just barely defeated by Helen Gym, who received 49,270 votes.

In 2019 at age 34, Thomas ran in the City Council At-Large primary again, this time endorsed by the Philadelphia Democratic City Committee and at least 13 labor unions. He placed 3rd out of 28 Democratic candidates with 62,830 votes and advanced to the 2019 General Election. In the general election he was victorious, placing 3rd with 189,819 votes, 14.2% of all votes cast.

Thomas endorsed Elizabeth Warren in the 2020 Democratic Party presidential primaries.

Thomas was the highest vote getter in the 2023 Primary and General Elections, receiving 108,330 and 197,642 votes in the respective contests. Thomas assumed office for his second term on January 2, 2024, and was elected by fellow members to serve as Majority Whip.

== Philadelphia City Council ==
=== Committee assignments ===
As of January, 2024:

- Legislative Oversight (chair)
- Education (chair)
- Children and Youth (Vice Chair)
- Appropriations
- Finance
- Rules
- Disabled and Persons With Special Needs
- Global Opportunities And Creative Innovative Economy
- Parks, Recreation and Cultural Affairs
- Public Health and Human Services
- Public Safety
- Technology And Information Services

=== Issues ===
==== Police Reform ====
In June 2020, Thomas and other lawmakers called for a slate of reforms in the wake of the murder of George Floyd, including residency requirements for police and recruiting more people of color for police work.

In October 2020, Thomas introduced a bill intended to decrease racial profiling by police during traffic stops. The Driving Equality ordinance alters which low-level motor vehicle violations can be enforced with a traffic stop as the primary enforcement mechanism. The eight motor vehicle code violations enforced by Driving Equality are:

- Late registration (with a sixty-day grace period)
- Relocation of temporary registration (must be visible)
- Relocation of license plate (must be visible)
- Missing a single brake light
- Items hanging from the rearview mirror
- Minor Bumper issues
- Driving with an expired inspection sticker
- Driving with an expired emission sticker

The bill passed in City Council on Thursday, October 14, 2021, with a 14–2 vote. In passing the bill, Philadelphia became the first large U.S. city to ban the use of pretextual stops.

The Driving Equality Ordinance was signed into law on November 3, 2021, and took effect 120 days subsequently thereafter. Before the law went into effect, though, the Fraternal Order of Police Lodge 5 filed a lawsuit in February 2022, claiming the ordinance was preempted by state law. Common Pleas Court Judge Craig Levin in March 2023 ruled the ordinance was not in violation of state law and that methods of enforcement of the state motor vehicle code are "matters of purely local concern."

==== Housing ====
As of November 2019, Thomas supports rent stabilization policies.

==== Substance Use ====
In March 2020 Thomas supported, during a committee voice vote, legislation that would label a supervised injection site as a "nuisance health establishment" and give City Council more control over licensing and location of supervised injection sites.

==== Labor and Employment ====
In December 2020, Thomas introduced legislation to require hotels and food service contractors at the airport and the stadiums to retain workers instead of firing them if the contract or employer is sold. Thomas also sponsored and moved legislation during the COVID-19 pandemic to require 50% of the city's request-for-proposals (RFPs) bids would be granted to Philadelphia businesses.

Taxes

Thomas has cited the fiscal health of the city as a major legislative priority. In an effort to make Philadelphia more business friendly, Thomas sponsored budget amendments in the FY22 and FY23 budgets to reduce the Business Income and Receipts Tax, a historically volatile tax that is regarded as onerous on local businesses.

== See also ==
- List of members of Philadelphia City Council since 1952
