= Katherine Gilmore Richardson =

American politician

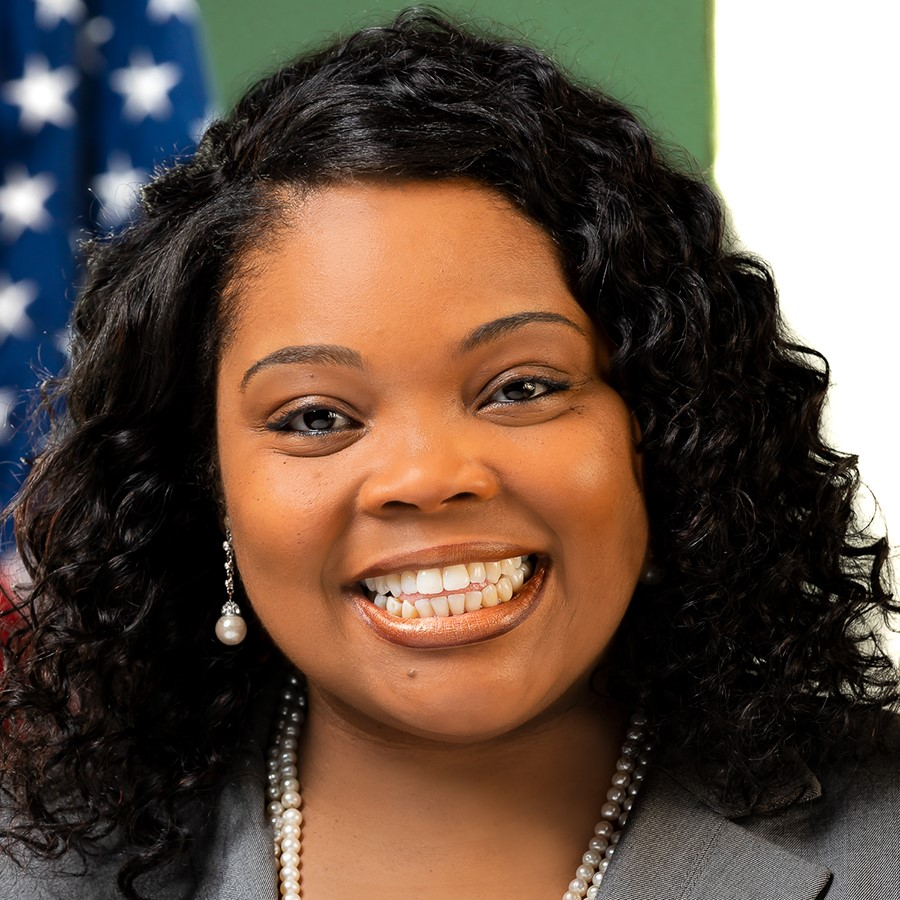

Majority Leader of Philadelphia City Council
- Incumbent
- Assumed office January 2, 2024
- Preceded by: Curtis J. Jones Jr.

Member of the Philadelphia City Council At-Large
- Incumbent
- Assumed office January 6, 2020
- Preceded by: Blondell Reynolds Brown

Personal details
- Born: 1983/1984 (age 42–43) Philadelphia, Pennsylvania
- Party: Democratic
- Children: 3
- Education: West Chester University
- Profession: Politician

Katherine Gilmore Richardson (born 1983/1984) is a Democratic politician and at-large member of the Philadelphia City Council. Gilmore Richardson was first elected to an at-large seat in 2019, becoming the youngest Black woman to serve on the city council. On January 2, 2024, she became both the youngest ever and the first At-Large member elected to serve as Majority Leader.

== Early life and education ==
Gilmore Richardson was born to a teenage mother from South Philadelphia and adopted at birth by Rev. Lorraine Jenkins Gilmore and James William Gilmore. She was raised in Philadelphia and attended the Julia R. Masterman Laboratory and Demonstration School and then the Philadelphia High School for Girls.

She attended West Chester University, earned a bachelor's in political science and a master's in administration with a concentration in public administration, and became a member of Zeta Phi Beta. She spent two years teaching as a substitute teacher at Overbrook High School where she taught math and computer science. In 2017, she completed The Campaign School program at Yale University.

== Political career ==
In 2008, Gilmore Richardson began working as a City Council staff member in the office of Blondell Reynolds Brown. Reynolds Brown met Gilmore Richardson when the latter was a junior at Girls High, their shared alma mater. Over 11 years, Gilmore Richardson worked in almost every position in her office, including Chief of Staff, before deciding to run for City Council in 2019. She was endorsed by the Philadelphia Democratic City Committee and The Philadelphia Inquirer in the Democratic primary, and placed in the top 5 with 7% of the votes, advancing to the general election.

In the November 2019 general election, she won the City Council At-Large seat, placing 4th out of seven candidates with 14.2% of the vote. She is the youngest Black woman to be elected to Philadelphia City Council. She has stated, "My work is a continuation of former At-Large City Councilperson Blondell Brown’s trailblazing legacy that was passed on from former City Councilmember Augusta Clark and Dr. Ethel Clark," and has expressed interest in using social media platforms for outreach to young constituents.

In 2021, Gilmore Richardson was appointed to the United States Environmental Protection Agency's Local Government Advisory Committee (LGAC). She is also the Vice Chair of the LGAC's Environmental Justice Working Group. She is the only representative on the LGAC from the Commonwealth of Pennsylvania.

In the November 2023 general election, she was re-elected to Philadelphia City Council for a second term. She won the City Council At-Large seat, placing 2nd out of seven candidates with 16.13% of the votes. During the 2024, Philadelphia City Council inauguration, she made history as the youngest and first At-Large member to be elected to serve as Majority Leader.

== Philadelphia City Council ==
=== Committee assignments ===
As of February 2025:

- Rules
- Finance (chair)
- Appropriations (vice-chair)
- Law and Government (chair)
- Licenses and Inspections
- Labor and Civil Services
- Commerce and Economic Development
- Ethics
- Fiscal Stability and Intergovernmental Cooperation
- People With Disabilities and Special Needs
- Whole Council (vice-chair)

=== Issues ===
==== Workforce Development ====
Introduced in 2020, the Career and Technical Education Civil Service Preference legislation changed the Philadelphia Home Rule Charter to provide a five-point preference to qualified civil service applicants within three years of completing a School District of Philadelphia Career and Technical Education (CTE) program. The legislation went into effect in May 2023.

Developed in 2020, Gilmore Richardson created the city's first ever Apprenticeship Guidebook. She developed this guidebook with strong support from local unions, who have been active partners in her work to expand opportunities in the skilled trades. The guidebook includes information on local apprenticeship programs, deadlines, and other essential information.

In June 2021, Gilmore Richardson passed the workforce development and career pathways information sheet bill requiring employers to provide an information sheet, created and updated by the Department of Labor, to workers either at the start of employment for gig economy workers or at the point of separation for all other workers. Gilmore Richardson Said "This legislation will help more Philadelphians move into family supporting and sustaining careers by providing them with information about job training and educational opportunities when they may need it most."

==== Fiscal Responsibility ====
In June 2020, Gilmore Richardson introduced a bill to require public hearings prior to adopting labor contracts, including the agreement with Fraternal Order of Police Lodge #5. This legislation was passed by City Council in September 2020. In October the Fraternal Order of Police Lodge #5 sued the city over the legislation, and Gilmore Richardson said the measure creates "transparency and accountability" for the police.

In May 2022, Gilmore Richardson passed legislation to account for the City of Philadelphia's estimated $6 million in Unclaimed property. The bill requires the Director of Finance to submit an annual report to City Council and the City Controller of all unclaimed property owed to the city, a status update regarding claims in process, and the total amount of revenue returned to the City of Philadelphia. In November 2022, the city received $6,035,842.55 in unclaimed property funds due to the city.

In February 2023, Gilmore Richardson passed legislation amending The Philadelphia Home Rule Charter to change the requirements for contributions of the Budget Stabilization Reserve. The legislation was voted into effect during the 2023 Philadelphia Primary Election.

==== Education ====
In February 2021 at a rally with the Philadelphia Federation of Teachers against the premature resumption of in-person learning, Gilmore Richardson said "As a former teacher, as a mother, and a councilmember, I'm angry. We should not have teachers in this position. Ever." She called for a vaccination plan for teachers and stated, "As we near the one-year anniversary of the pandemic, getting children back into classrooms throughout the city is vitally important to their future."

In April 2021, Gilmore Richardson released a report recommending for conflict resolution training to be offered to all School District of Philadelphia students as part of a larger strategy to reduce gun violence and the number of conflicts amongst young people. The School District of Philadelphia announced that they would offer trauma-informed, evidence-based conflict resolution training at the Tier 1 level that is culturally competent and developed in collaboration with school staff and teachers next school year.

==== Tangled Titles ====
Inspired by her personal challenges with the tangled title of her childhood home, In September 2021, Gilmore Richardson introduced legislation to help prevent tangled titles in Philadelphia. The Tangled Title Disclosure Bill requires funeral homes to share information, provided in partnership by the Department of Records and Register of Wills, about probating estates and avoiding tangled titles when they provide a death certificate. The bill went into effect in August 2022.

Her advocacy inspired investigative reporting on how tangled titles impact Black generational wealth in other cities such as St. Louis.

==== Public Safety ====
In June 2021, Gilmore Richardson passed legislation to reform Philadelphia's minor curfew law. The curfew reform bill simplified the curfew by making the times easier to understand. It also made the law less punitive by removing all fines and changing the requirements that young people must be taken to a police district.

She also worked closely with the Administration to establish Community Evening Resource Centers (CERC), safe spaces for minors who violate curfew and young people seeking support, mentorship, programming and recreational activities. As of June 2023, there are six CERC's located in each police division across the city.

==== Voting ====
To commemorate the 100th anniversary of the Nineteenth Amendment, Gilmore Richardson introduced a resolution to ceremonially change the nickname of the city of Philadelphia to "The City of Sisterly Love" for the duration of 2020.

==== Arts and Culture ====
In March 2021, Gilmore Richardson and Councilmember Isaiah Thomas moved to transfer $1.3 million to support artists and art organizations from the City recession relief fund.

== Personal life ==
Gilmore Richardson is married to David Richardson and they have three children.

She is a Life Member of the Zeta Phi Beta sorority.

== See also ==
- List of members of Philadelphia City Council since 1952
