= Pennsylvania Association of Staff Nurses and Allied Professionals =

Labor union in Pennsylvania

PASNAP
- Pennsylvania Association of Staff Nurses and Allied Professionals
- Founded: May 24, 2000
- Headquarters: Plymouth Meeting, Pennsylvania
- Location: United States of America
- Members: 11,000
- Key people: Maureen May, RN President
- Affiliations: ACMH Nurses United, ACMH Techs United, Brooke Glen Nurses Association, Butler Nurses/Pennsylvania Independent Nurses, Butler Techs United, Chestnut Hill Nurses & Techs United, Eagleville Hospital Nurses & Techs United, Einstein Nurses United, Fair Acres United, Fitzgerald Mercy Hospital Nurses Association, Fox Chase Nurses & Techs United, Fox Chase OCR United, Geisinger Advanced Practice Professionals, Geisinger Techs & Allied Professionals, Indiana Registered Nurses Association, Jeanes Nurses United, Jeanes Allied Health Workers, Northeast Pennsylvania Nurses Association, Nurses Association of Lower Bucks Hospital, Nurses Association of Temple University, Pottstown Nurses United, St. Christopher's Hospital For Children Nurses United, St. Mary United Nurses Union, Suburban General Nurses'Association, Temple Faculty Practice Nurses Union, Temple North Anesthesia Coalition, Temple University Hospital Allied Professionals, Temple University Hospital Nurses Association, Warren General Hospital Professional Employees Association, Wills Eye Nurses & Techs United, Wyoming Valley Certified Nurses Anesthetists Association, Wyoming Valley Nurses Association
- Website: www.pasnap.com

The Pennsylvania Association of Staff Nurses and Allied Professionals (PASNAP)^{[1]} is a labor union representing registered nurses and allied health professionals in Pennsylvania. Founded in 2000 to promote patient-centered care for patients and frontline healthcare workers, union and nonunion alike, across the state, the organization represents more than 11,000 healthcare workers and advocates for workplace protections, patient safety standards, safe staffing, access to critical care, and collective bargaining rights in healthcare settings.

PASNAP is headquartered in Plymouth Meeting, Pennsylvania, and is led by an elected leadership composed of nurses and healthcare professionals from member workplaces.

== History ==
Many of the bargaining units that comprise PASNAP were originally organized in the 1960s, '70s and '80s by the Pennsylvania Nurses Association (PNA), which included and was run by nurse managers (who were unable to form a labor union under the National Labor Relations Act) and associate members outside formal collective bargaining units.

Because managers controlled the PNA, staff nurses became increasingly frustrated by PNA's reluctance to fight for safe staffing and other critical bedside-care concerns. In 1994, the Pennsylvania State Education Association (PSEA) raided PNA's private-sector and Temple University Health System bargaining units. SEIU District 1199P raided PNA in 1997, taking over a large unit of state-employed nurses and health professionals. Never eager to engage in collective bargaining, PNA voluntarily shed its remaining collective bargaining unit (composed of nurses in the Pennsylvania State System of Higher Education) by holding an election in which the nurses agreed to affiliate with the Office and Professional Employees International Union.

The nurses, however, remained restless under the leadership of PSEA. A number of local union leaders within PSEA HealthCare felt the nurses should disaffiliate from PSEA and form an independent union. At a national meeting of unionized nurses sponsored by the California Nurses Association (CNA) in March 2000, CNA staff approached PSEA HealthCare leaders and suggested forming an independent nurses association associated (but not affiliated) with CNA. Many of the PSEA nurse leaders were receptive to the idea. Although the executive board of PSEA HealthCare approved the dual affiliation with the AFT, 12 local unions (primarily located in southeastern Pennsylvania) held their own meeting on May 24, 2000, and disaffiliated from PSEA. PSEA brought the issue before the National Labor Relations Board (NLRB). In October 2000, in what was described as a Solomonic decision because it "split the difference", the Pittsburgh region of the NLRB ruled that each local union was free to do as it wished. Seven bargaining units with about 1,000 members became dual affiliates of AFT and PSEA. This organization became known as HealthCare PSEA. The 12 other bargaining units, with a membership of about 3,500, formed PASNAP.

== Membership and Structure ==
PASNAP represents registered nurses as well as allied health professionals such as technicians, therapists, and other healthcare staff working in hospitals and healthcare facilities. The union represents more than 11,000 healthcare professionals across Pennsylvania.

The organization operates as an independent labor union with leadership elected from its membership. Officers and executive board members are typically practicing nurses or healthcare professionals who continue to work in clinical settings while serving in union leadership roles.

== Collective bargaining ==
PASNAP has proven to be one of the most militant nurses unions in Pennsylvania, striking or threatening to strike numerous times in its short history as an independent union. The union led a 23-day nurses' strike in the winter of 2003, one of Pennsylvania's longest health care walkouts.^{[6]} In April 2010 the union led a month-long strike at Temple University Hospital defeating many hospital demands, including one banning nurses from making public critiques of management policies related to patient care. The union led a 24-hour strike against the Tennessee-based Community Health Systems in December 2010 in Wilkes Barre while the threat of a second strike on May Day 2010 later backed the for profit company off of major healthcare concessions and anti union demands.

In May 2025, around 500 nurses at Butler Memorial Hospital ratified a new three-year contract with 80% approval after negotiations centered on workplace safety and nurse retention.The agreement included measures addressing workplace violence prevention and other safety improvements for hospital staff.

That same month, more than 80 nurses at Brooke Glen Behavioral Hospital in Montgomery County ratified a three-year contract following a year of negotiations focused on improving staffing levels and retaining experienced mental health nurses.

In August 2025, nearly 300 nurses at Pottstown Hospital ratified a new three-year agreement with 96% approval after more than nine months of bargaining. Negotiations emphasized nurse recruitment and retention as well as improvements to wages and working conditions.

Later in 2025, more than 300 nurses, technicians, and licensed practical nurses at Armstrong County Memorial Hospital ratified new three-year contracts covering two PASNAP-represented bargaining units. The agreements addressed workplace safety measures, scheduling protections, and patient care conditions.

In February 2026, approximately 630 nurses at St. Mary Medical Center in Langhorne voted to ratify a three-year contract with 94% approval following an extended bargaining session. The agreement included wage increases—up to 17 percent over the life of the contract—as well as provisions addressing staffing practices and nurse recruitment and retention.

These agreements reflect PASNAP’s role in negotiating contracts across multiple healthcare facilities in Pennsylvania on issues including staffing levels, worker safety, and compensation for healthcare professionals.

== Organizing ==
Since its founding in 2000, PASNAP has expanded through organizing campaigns among nurses and allied health professionals in hospitals and healthcare facilities across Pennsylvania. According to the organization, more than 40 groups of healthcare workers from both large urban medical centers and smaller community hospitals have voted to unionize and join PASNAP through National Labor Relations Board (NLRB) elections or other union recognition processes.

The union’s organizing efforts focus primarily on registered nurses and allied healthcare professionals, including technicians, therapists, physician assistants, and nurse practitioners working in hospital settings. PASNAP states that organizing campaigns typically address issues such as staffing levels, workplace safety, professional autonomy, and employee participation in decisions affecting patient care.

PASNAP provides organizing support to healthcare workers interested in forming a union, including education about labor rights, assistance with union authorization campaigns, and guidance through the process of filing for representation elections with federal labor authorities. The organization notes that the right of employees to form unions and bargain collectively is protected under U.S. federal labor law.

Through these organizing efforts, PASNAP has grown to represent more than 11,000 nurses and allied health professionals across Pennsylvania

== Advocacy ==
PASNAP advocates for healthcare policies related to patient safety, workplace protections for healthcare workers, and access to healthcare services in Pennsylvania. The organization has supported legislation and regulatory reforms addressing hospital staffing standards, workplace violence prevention, and healthcare workforce conditions.

One of the union’s major policy priorities is the establishment of enforceable nurse-to-patient staffing standards in hospitals. PASNAP has supported Pennsylvania’s proposed Patient Safety Act (HB 106), legislation that would set minimum nurse-to-patient ratios in hospital units and establish legal protections for nurses who refuse unsafe assignments. In 2023, the bill passed the Pennsylvania House of Representatives with bipartisan support.

PASNAP has also advocated for workplace violence prevention in healthcare settings. The union has supported the Healthcare Workplace Violence Prevention Act (HB 926), which would require hospitals to establish violence prevention committees, conduct risk assessments, and maintain reporting systems for violent incidents involving healthcare workers.

The organization has participated in advocacy efforts related to the regulation of emerging healthcare technologies. In 2025, PASNAP leadership testified before the Pennsylvania House Communications and Technology Committee in support of legislation to regulate the use of artificial intelligence in healthcare settings and ensure that clinical decision-making remains under the authority of medical professionals.

PASNAP has also supported policies aimed at improving healthcare access and affordability, including protecting funding for Medicaid and Affordable Care Act programs. The organization has promoted a “Healthcare Bill of Rights,” a policy framework advocating for universal access to healthcare, safe staffing standards, and protections against harassment and violence in healthcare workplaces.

Earlier advocacy efforts by PASNAP members contributed to the passage of Act 102 of 2008, a Pennsylvania law prohibiting mandatory overtime for healthcare workers except in emergency circumstances
