= Reclaim Philadelphia =

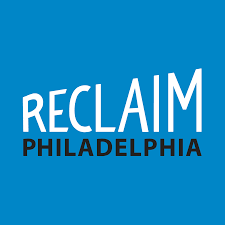
- Logo of Reclaim Philadelphia
- Formation: May 2016
- Type: Advocacy group, Community organization
- Region served: Philadelphia, Pennsylvania, United States
- Members: 660 dues paying members (2025)
- Executive Director: Seth Anderson-Oberman
- Political Director: Sergio Cea

Reclaim Philadelphia is an American progressive activist group based in the city of Philadelphia. Strongly associated with the 501(c)(4) group Pennsylvania Stands Up, Reclaim was founded out of the structures created by the Bernie Sanders 2016 presidential campaign.

== History ==
Reclaim Philadelphia was founded after Bernie Sanders had suspended his 2016 presidential campaign, as several Philadelphia-based activists disappointed with his loss decided to form an activist group in order to continue to advocate for what they viewed as progressive policies. The victory of Donald Trump in that year's presidential election galvanised the group, which began to hold more regular meetings as a result. Officially the Philadelphia chapter of the national group Our Revolution, Reclaim was active in Larry Krasner's successful 2017 campaign to become Philadelphia district attorney, credited by Krasner as having a "key role" in his victory. In the 2018 election cycle, Reclaim members took control of the 1st and 2nd Philadelphia wards, located in South Philadelphia. Reclaim is noted for its approach to city politics, instructing its members to run for the position of Democratic committeeman in their local area as a way to take control of the Philadelphia ward system.

Reclaim was active in assisting the election campaign of Kendra Brooks to the Philadelphia City Council. In 2020, two members of Reclaim, Nikil Saval, who had co-founded the organization, and Rick Krajewski, were elected to the Pennsylvania Legislature, primarying incumbents Larry Farnese and James R. Roebuck respectively.
