= Curtis J. Jones Jr. =

American politician (born 1956/57)

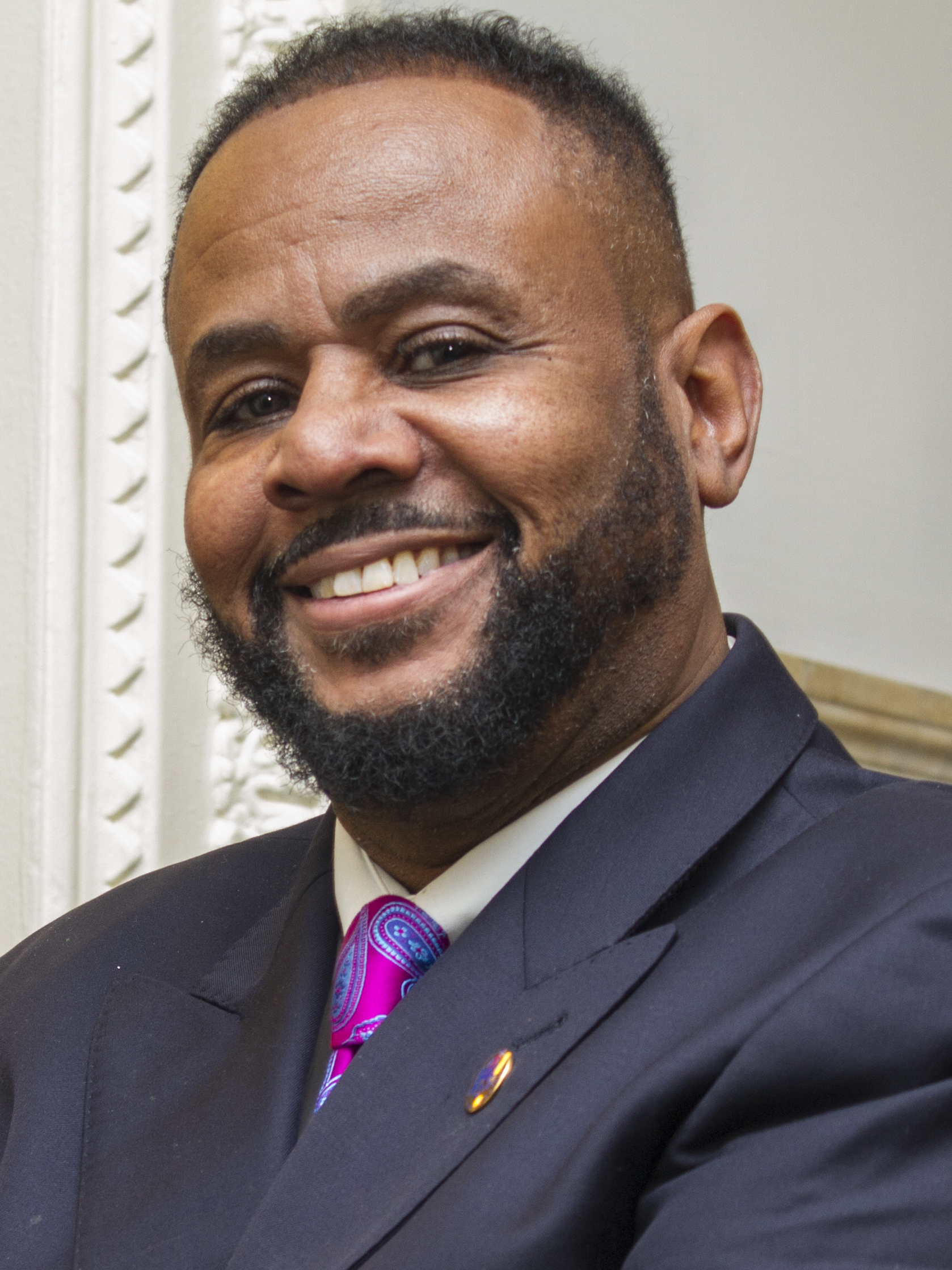
- Jones in 2016

Member of the Philadelphia City Council from the 4th District
- Incumbent
- Assumed office January 7, 2008
- Preceded by: Carol Campbell

Personal details
- Born: 1956 or 1957 (age 68–69) Philadelphia, Pennsylvania, US
- Party: Democratic

Curtis J. Jones Jr. (born 1956 or 1957) is an American politician and a Democratic member of the Philadelphia City Council. In 2007, he was elected to represent the 4th District, which covers parts of North, Northwest, and West Philadelphia. He has served as Majority Leader (2012–2016, 2022–2023) and Majority Whip (2017–2022).

== Personal life ==
Jones was born and raised in West Philadelphia. At age 15 he was in the 54th and Berks Street gang, but credits Falaka Fattah and the House of Umoja for his reformation saying, "I can literally say that Sister Falaka and the House of Umoja saved my life. They taught a lot of people that we don't all have to go to college, but we can all be part of our community, and that's what is important.''

His first attempt at elected office was running for Democratic National Committee delegate at the age of 18. As a young activist he co-founded the Youth Movement to Clean Up Politics with Chaka Fattah and also worked at House of Umoja. He converted to Islam in high school.

Jones is a graduate of Overbrook High School and received a professional certification from the American Contract Compliance Association and took courses at the University of Pennsylvania's Fels Institute of Government.

In September 2021, Jones's son died awaiting an organ transplant. He said his son's care was delayed because the intensive care unit was at capacity with COVID-19 patients.

As of September 2020, he lives in the Overbrook Farms neighborhood.

== Career ==
In 1979 at age 22, he and Chaka Fattah ran as a team for Philadelphia City Commissioner in the Democratic primary, receiving the endorsement of the Black United Front. He lost that race, coming in seventh in a field of twenty two candidates. He was appointed to a citizen's committee run by the Greater Philadelphia Partnership on researching and improving the office of Philadelphia City Commissioner.

Jones worked as an assistant manager in the Philadelphia Department of Commerce.

In January 1987, he announced he would again run for City Commissioner after Marian B. Tasco announced she would resign to run for City Council. He ended this campaign in March at the urging of Mayor Wilson Goode and became the staff director and deputy finance director of the Minority Business Enterprise Council. In 1991 he left MBEC to manage the unsuccessful mayoral campaign of Lucien Blackwell.

In 1992 he became president and CEO of the Philadelphia Commercial Development Corporation where he served for 15 years before until resigning to run for City Council in 2007.

In 2007 Jones ran for Philadelphia City Council's 4th Council District seat. He and real estate lawyer Matt McClure ran against incumbent Carol Ann Campbell. Jones was endorsed by the Philadelphia Daily News and won the Democratic nomination by 446 votes. Jones received 35% of the vote, Carol Ann Campbell received 33% and McClure received 32%. In the general election he defeated Republican Melvin C. Johnakin Jr., winning 86% of votes cast.

Jones was re-elected in 2011, 2015, and 2019. During his tenure on City Council, Jones has pursued criminal justice reforms such as ban-the-box and abolishing cash bail. He served as the council's Democratic majority leader from 2012 to 2016, and has been majority whip since 2020.

== Philadelphia City Council ==
=== Committee assignments ===
As of February 2021, Jones is a member of the following committees:

- Commerce And Economic Development
- Finance
- Housing, Neighborhood Development, and the Homeless (vice chair)
- Legislative Oversight (chair)
- Licenses and Inspections
- Parks, Recreation and Cultural Affairs
- Public Property and Public Works
- Public Safety (chair)
- Rules
- Transportation And Public Utilities

=== Issues ===
==== Gun violence ====
Jones is a member of the Special Committee on Gun Violence Prevention. Speaking on his frustration of the lack of attention toward Philadelphia's gun violence epidemic, he said "If 200 whales washed up on the shores of New Jersey, every scientist and biologist would come to find out why this was happening. But when it comes to 200 urban kids dying, nobody cares. It’s a new normal, and it’s not acceptable."

In 2018 he introduced legislation to temporarily remove firearms from individuals who pose a threat to themselves or the public.

==== Criminal justice ====
Jones is a co-chair of the Philadelphia City Council Special Committee on Criminal Justice Reform. Describing City Council members' attitude toward justice system reform in 2018 he said, "I’ve got two kinds of colleagues on the council: tree-hugging, thug-loving liberals who want to save souls and fiscal conservatives who want to save budgets."

In 2018, Jones played a part in closing Philadelphia's House of Correction, a dilapidated facility that had been in continuous operation since 1927.

In 2020 he sponsored the legislation that will create a ballot referendum on creating a Citizens Police Oversight Commission. During testimony on this legislation, City Council learned of the police killing of Walter Wallace, Jr.

==== Housing ====
Jones is vice-chair of the Housing, Neighborhood Development, and the Homeless committee.

In 2017 he introduced a "just cause" eviction bill to prevent landlords from evicting a tenant when a lease expires. The legislation was inspired by the sale of the Penn Wynn Manor apartments, where the purchasing company told tenants their leases would not be renewed. Jones said "You have a right to be a capitalist, but when you wholesale exploit people’s ignorance and poverty, then it is government’s responsibility to step up to the plate and provide protections, and that’s what I intend to do." In 2018 he introduced amendments to this bill that would restrict its application to leases that are less than one year.

In response to housing issues related to the COVID-19 pandemic, a package of six bills were proposed as the Emergency Housing Protection Act. Only five advanced from City Council's housing committee, with the rent stabilization bill failing to advance. Jones did not vote for or against this bill in committee.

Jones does not support rent control.

==== Employment ====
In 2015 Jones introduced legislation to strengthen Philadelphia's Ban the Box law, which prohibits employers from asking an applicant about their criminal record. The strengthened provisions removed some exemptions for employers, required employers to be more transparent, and limited the time period on convictions an employer can consider to seven years prior.

==== W. Wilson Goode Sr. Way ====
On June 14, 2018, Jones introduced a resolution to rename the 2400 block of N. 59th St. "W. Wilson Goode Sr. Way" in honor of former Philadelphia mayor Wilson Goode, who was mayor during the 1985 MOVE bombing. Jones didn't speak to anyone in his district before introducing this resolution and refused to withdraw the resolution when met with community opposition. In 2020, several groups protested to remove the honorary street renaming.

==== Devil's Pool ====
After neighbors near to Wissahickon Valley Park complained about the increased, unauthorized use of Devil's Pool for swimming, Jones proposed filling the pool with rocks.

== See also ==
- List of members of Philadelphia City Council since 1952
