= 2011 Philadelphia City Council election =

- November 8, 2011

All 17 seats on the Philadelphia City Council 9 seats needed for a majority

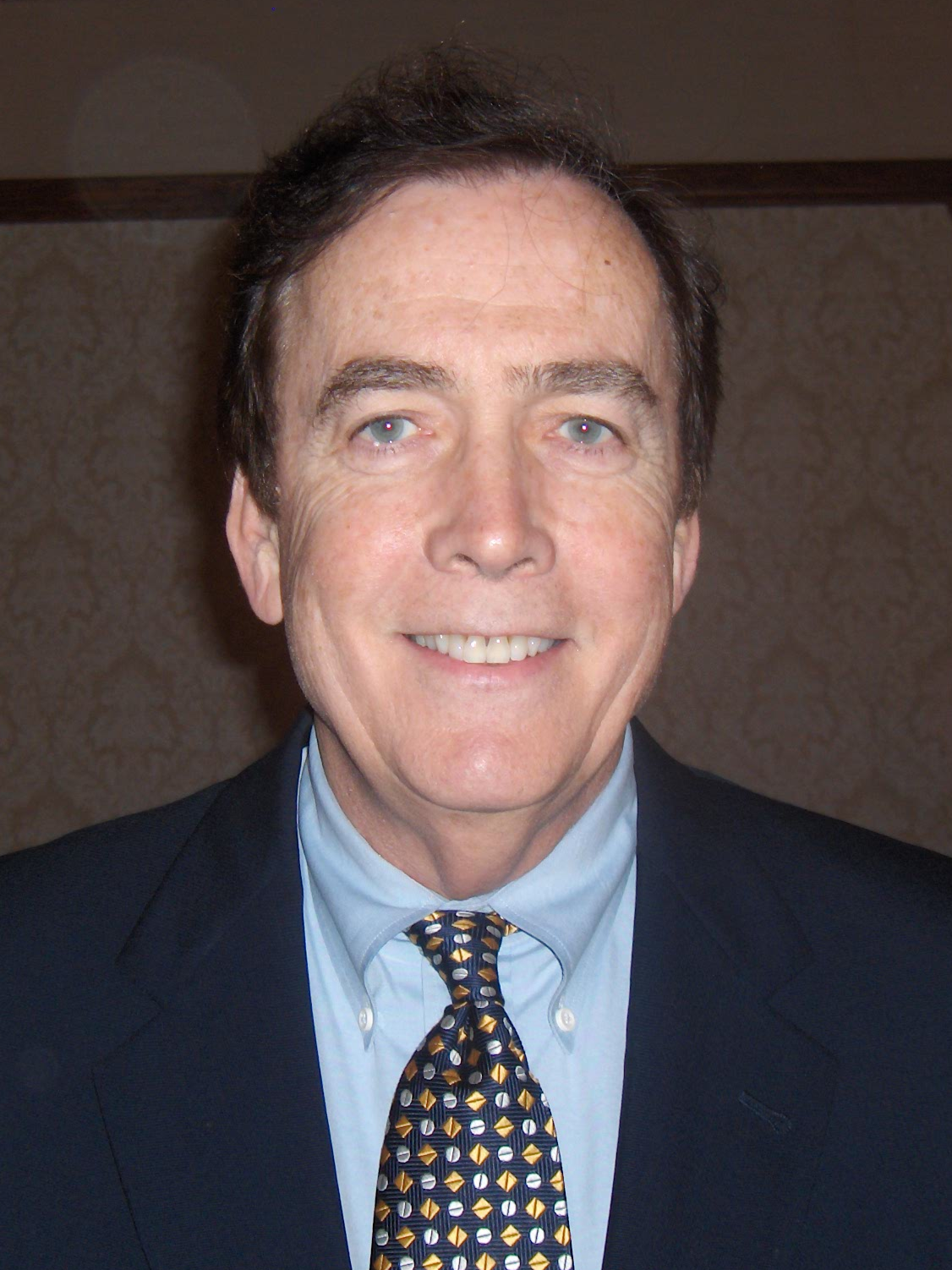
	First party	Second party
Leader	Marian B. Tasco	Brian J. O'Neill
Party	Democratic	Republican
Leader's seat	District 9	District 10
Last election	14 seats	3 seats
Seats before	14	3
Seats won	14	3
Seat change	Steady	Steady
Council President before election
Anna Verna
Democratic
Elected Council President
Darrell L. Clarke
Democratic

The 2011 Philadelphia City Council election took place on November 8, 2011, along with the 2011 Philadelphia municipal election. The composition of the Philadelphia City Council remained unchanged from before the election, with Democrats maintaining their 14-3 majority on the council.

== 1st District ==
Frank DiCicco, a Democrat who held the office since 1996, retired. Mark Squilla won a four-way primary and the subsequent general election to succeed him.

=== Democratic primary ===
==== Nominee ====
- Mark Squilla, systems analyst

==== Eliminated in primary ====
- Vern Anastasio
- Joseph M. Grace
- Jeff Hornstein

==== Results ====
District 1, 2011 Democratic primary
Party	Candidate	Votes	%
Democratic	Mark Squilla	7,234	41.03
Democratic	Joseph M. Grace	4,074	23.11
Democratic	Jeff Hornstein	3,511	19.92
Democratic	Vern Anastasio	2,807	15.92
Write-in		3	0.02
Total votes		17,629	100.00

=== Republican primary ===
==== Results ====
District 1, 2011 Republican primary
Party	Candidate	Votes	%
	Write-in	14	100.00
Total votes		14	100.00

=== General election ===
==== Results ====
District 1, 2011 general election
Party	Candidate	Votes	%
Democratic	Mark Squilla	14,331	99.81
Write-in		28	0.19
Total votes		14,359	100.00
Democratic hold			

== 2nd District ==
City Council President Anna Verna, who had held the seat since 1975 and was president since 1999, announced her retirement on January 24, 2011. State Representative Kenyatta Johnson narrowly won the Democratic primary and later the general election, succeeding her in office.

=== Democratic primary ===
==== Nominee ====
- Kenyatta Johnson, member of the Pennsylvania House of Representatives from the 186th district (2009–present)

==== Eliminated in primary ====
- Barbara A. Capozzi
- Tracey Gordon
- Damon K. Roberts

==== Results ====
District 2, 2011 Democratic primary
Party	Candidate	Votes	%
Democratic	Kenyatta Johnson	7,486	44.49
Democratic	Barbara A. Capozzi	7,446	44.25
Democratic	Tracey Gordon	1,566	9.31
Democratic	Damon K. Roberts	326	1.94
Write-in		2	0.01
Total votes		16,826	100.00

=== Republican primary ===
==== Nominee ====
- Ivan Cohen, businessman and Republican committeeman

==== Results ====
District 2, 2011 Republican primary
Party	Candidate	Votes	%
Republican	Ivan Cohen	1,063	99.63
Write-in		4	0.37
Total votes		1,067	100.00

=== General election ===
==== Results ====
District 2, 2011 general election
Party	Candidate	Votes	%
Democratic	Kenyatta Johnson	13,286	79.25
Republican	Ivan Cohen	3,466	20.67
Write-in		13	0.08
Total votes		16,765	100.00
Democratic hold			

== 3rd District ==
Incumbent councilmember Jannie Blackwell won reelection to a sixth term.

=== Democratic primary ===
==== Nominee ====
- Jannie Blackwell, incumbent councilmember (1992–present)

==== Eliminated in primary ====
- Tony Dphax King

==== Results ====
District 3, 2011 Democratic primary
Party	Candidate	Votes	%
Democratic	Jannie Blackwell (incumbent)	11,140	98.29
Democratic	Tony Dphax King	146	1.29
Write-in		48	0.42
Total votes		11,334	100.00

=== Republican primary ===
==== Results ====
District 3, 2011 Republican primary
Party	Candidate	Votes	%
	Write-in	12	100.00
Total votes		12	100.00

=== General election ===
==== Results ====
District 3, 2011 general election
Party	Candidate	Votes	%
Democratic	Jannie Blackwell (incumbent)	14,822	89.88
Independent	Alicia R. Burbage	1,660	10.07
Write-in		8	0.05
Total votes		16,490	100.00
Democratic hold			

== 4th District ==
Incumbent councilmember Curtis Jones Jr. won reelection to a second term.

=== Democratic primary ===
==== Nominee ====
- Curtis Jones Jr., incumbent councilmember (2008–present)

==== Results ====
District 4, 2011 Democratic primary
Party	Candidate	Votes	%
Democratic	Curtis Jones Jr. (incumbent)	13,884	99.91
Write-in		13	0.09
Total votes		13,897	100.00

=== Republican primary ===
==== Results ====
District 4, 2011 Republican primary
Party	Candidate	Votes	%
	Write-in	9	100.00
Total votes		9	100.00

=== General election ===
==== Results ====
District 4, 2011 general election
Party	Candidate	Votes	%
Democratic	Curtis Jones Jr. (incumbent)	17,612	99.90
Write-in		18	0.10
Total votes		17,630	100.00
Democratic hold			

== 5th District ==
Incumbent councilmember Darrell L. Clarke won reelection to a third term.

=== Democratic primary ===
==== Nominee ====
- Darrell L. Clarke, incumbent councilmember (1999–present)

==== Eliminated in primary ====
- Suzanne Carn

==== Results ====
District 5, 2011 Democratic primary
Party	Candidate	Votes	%
Democratic	Darrell L. Clarke (incumbent)	11,403	72.87
Democratic	Suzanne Carn	4,236	27.07
Write-in		10	0.06
Total votes		15,649	100.00

=== Republican primary ===
==== Results ====
District 5, 2011 Republican primary
Party	Candidate	Votes	%
	Write-in	4	100.00
Total votes		4	100.00

=== General election ===
==== Results ====
District 5, 2011 general election
Party	Candidate	Votes	%
Democratic	Darrell L. Clarke (incumbent)	16,121	99.85
Write-in		25	0.15
Total votes		16,146	100.00
Democratic hold			

== 6th District ==
Longtime incumbent Joan Krajewski, who had held the seat since 1980, retired. Bobby Henon, political director of IBEW Local 98, succeeded her in office.

=== Democratic primary ===
==== Nominee ====
- Bobby Henon, political director of IBEW Local 98

==== Eliminated in primary ====
- Martin G. Bednarek

==== Results ====
District 6, 2011 Democratic primary
Party	Candidate	Votes	%
Democratic	Bobby Henon	8,210	65.22
Democratic	Martin G. Bednarek	4,376	34.76
Write-in		2	0.02
Total votes		12,588	100.00

=== Republican primary ===
==== Nominee ====
- Sandra Stewart, interior designer and founder of the Tacony Civic Association

==== Results ====
District 6, 2011 Republican primary
Party	Candidate	Votes	%
Republican	Sandra Stewart	2,517	99.92
Write-in		2	0.08
Total votes		2,519	100.00

=== General election ===
==== Results ====
District 6, 2011 general election
Party	Candidate	Votes	%
Democratic	Bobby Henon	11,463	71.74
Republican	Sandra Stewart	4,512	28.24
Write-in		3	0.02
Total votes		15,978	100.00
Democratic hold			

== 7th District ==
Incumbent councilmember Maria Quiñones-Sánchez won reelection to a second term.

=== Democratic primary ===
==== Nominee ====
- Maria Quiñones-Sánchez, incumbent councilmember (2008–present)

==== Eliminated in primary ====
- Daniel J. Savage

==== Results ====
District 7, 2011 Democratic primary
Party	Candidate	Votes	%
Democratic	Maria Quiñones-Sánchez (incumbent)	7,198	60.45
Democratic	Daniel J. Savage	4,707	39.53
Write-in		2	0.02
Total votes		11,907	100.00

=== Republican primary ===
==== Results ====
District 7, 2011 Republican primary
Party	Candidate	Votes	%
	Write-in	18	100.00
Total votes		18	100.00

=== General election ===
District 7, 2011 general election
Party	Candidate	Votes	%
Democratic	Maria Quiñones-Sánchez (incumbent)	7,701	99.79
Write-in		16	0.21
Total votes		7,717	100.00
Democratic hold			

== 8th District ==
Incumbent councilmember Donna Reed Miller, who had held the office since 1996, retired. Cindy Bass, a senior policy advisor to U.S. Representative Chaka Fattah, succeeded her in office.

=== Democratic primary ===
==== Nominee ====
- Cindy Bass, senior policy advisor to U.S. Representative Chaka Fattah

==== Eliminated in primary ====
- William Durham Jr.
- Andrew Lofton
- Greg Paulmier
- Robin M. Tasco
- Howard Treatman
- Verna Tyner

==== Results ====
District 8, 2011 Democratic primary
Party	Candidate	Votes	%
Democratic	Cindy Bass	8,883	39.38
Democratic	Greg Paulmier	4,796	21.26
Democratic	Verna Tyner	4,185	18.55
Democratic	Howard Treatman	2,950	13.08
Democratic	Robin M. Tasco	735	3.26
Democratic	Andrew Lofton	637	2.82
Democratic	William A. Durham Jr.	373	1.65
Write-in		0	0.00
Total votes		22,559	100.00

=== Republican primary ===
==== Results ====
District 8, 2011 Republican primary
Party	Candidate	Votes	%
	Write-in	7	100.00
Total votes		7	100.00

=== General election ===
==== Results ====
District 8, 2011 general election
Party	Candidate	Votes	%
Democratic	Cindy Bass	18,405	88.08
Green	Brian Rudnick	2,483	11.88
Write-in		7	0.03
Total votes		20,895	100.00
Democratic hold			

== 9th District ==
Incumbent councilmember and Majority Leader Marian B. Tasco, who had held the seat since 1988, won reelection to a seventh term.

=== Democratic primary ===
==== Nominee ====
- Marian B. Tasco, incumbent councilmember (1988–present)

==== Eliminated in primary ====
- Bobbie Curry
- Lamont Thomas

==== Results ====
District 9, 2011 Democratic primary
Party	Candidate	Votes	%
Democratic	Marian B. Tasco (incumbent)	9,347	62.66
Democratic	Lamont W. Thomas	4,369	29.29
Democratic	Bobbie T. Curry	1,194	8.00
Write-in		6	0.04
Total votes		14,916	100.00

=== Republican primary ===
==== Results ====
District 9, 2011 Republican primary
Party	Candidate	Votes	%
	Write-in	4	100.00
Total votes		4	100.00

=== General election ===
==== Results ====
District 9, 2011 general election
Party	Candidate	Votes	%
Democratic	Marian B. Tasco (incumbent)	15,666	99.94
Write-in		9	0.06
Total votes		15,675	100.00
Democratic hold			

== 10th District ==
Incumbent councilmember and Minority Leader Brian J. O'Neill, who had held the seat since 1980, won reelection to a ninth term.

=== Democratic primary ===
==== Nominee ====
- Bill Rubin, vice chairman of the Philadelphia Board of Pensions and Retirement

==== Results ====
District 10, 2011 Democratic primary
Party	Candidate	Votes	%
Democratic	Bill Rubin	6,747	99.91
Write-in		6	0.09
Total votes		6,753	100.00

=== Republican primary ===
==== Nominee ====
- Brian J. O'Neill, incumbent councilmember (1980–present)

==== Results ====
District 10, 2011 Republican primary
Party	Candidate	Votes	%
Republican	Brian J. O'Neill (incumbent)	5,214	99.96
Write-in		2	0.04
Total votes		5,216	100.00

=== General election ===
==== Results ====
District 10, 2011 general election
Party	Candidate	Votes	%
Republican	Brian J. O'Neill (incumbent)	13,594	59.06
Democratic	Bill Rubin	9,419	40.92
Write-in		4	0.02
Total votes		23,017	100.00
Republican hold			

== At-Large Seats ==
=== Democratic primary ===
==== Results ====
Philadelphia City Council At-Large, 2011 Democratic primary Vote for 5
Party	Candidate	Votes	%
Democratic	Blondell Reynolds Brown (incumbent)	66,334	13.91
Democratic	Bill Green IV (incumbent)	65,034	13.63
Democratic	William K. Greenlee (incumbent)	55,175	11.57
Democratic	W. Wilson Goode Jr. (incumbent)	47,225	9.90
Democratic	Jim Kenney (incumbent)	46,282	9.70
Democratic	Sherrie Cohen	44,528	9.33
Democratic	Andrew Toy	39,467	8.27
Democratic	Isaiah Thomas	31,515	6.61
Democratic	Michael Jones	23,234	4.87
Democratic	Edward J. Nesmith	16,674	3.50
Democratic	Lawrence P. Clark	11,671	2.45
Democratic	Humberto Perez	11,211	2.35
Democratic	Ralph P. Blakney	10,482	2.20
Democratic	Janis E. Manson	8,100	1.70
Write-in		76	0.02
Total votes		477,008	100.00

=== Republican primary ===
==== Results ====
Philadelphia City Council At-Large, 2011 Republican primary Vote for 5
Party	Candidate	Votes	%
Republican	David Oh	10,928	18.46
Republican	Dennis M. O'Brien	10,228	17.27
Republican	Joseph McColgan	7,965	13.45
Republican	Al Taubenberger	7,323	12.37
Republican	Michael Untermeyer	7,077	11.95
Republican	Malcolm L. Lazin	6,873	11.61
Republican	Frank Rizzo Jr. (incumbent)	5,066	8.56
Republican	Stephen A. Odabashian	2,287	3.86
Republican	Elmer H. Money	1,429	2.41
Write-in		36	0.06
Total votes		59,212	100.00

=== General election ===
==== Results ====
Philadelphia City Council At-Large, 2011 general election Vote for 5
Party	Candidate	Votes	%
Democratic	Bill Green IV (incumbent)	130,403	16.75
Democratic	Jim Kenney (incumbent)	122,384	15.72
Democratic	Blondell Reynolds Brown (incumbent)	114,396	14.70
Democratic	W. Wilson Goode Jr. (incumbent)	113,431	14.57
Democratic	William K. Greenlee (incumbent)	110,544	14.20
Republican	Dennis M. O'Brien	48,675	6.25
Republican	David Oh	38,835	4.99
Republican	Al Taubenberger	38,632	4.96
Republican	Joseph McColgan	30,936	3.97
Republican	Michael Untermeyer	26,336	3.38
Independent	Richard Johnson	3,627	0.47
Write-in		174	0.02
Total votes		778,373	100.00
Democratic hold			
Democratic hold			
Democratic hold			
Democratic hold			
Democratic hold			
Republican hold			
Republican hold			
