= 2007 Philadelphia City Council election =

- November 6, 2007

All 17 seats on the Philadelphia City Council 9 seats needed for a majority
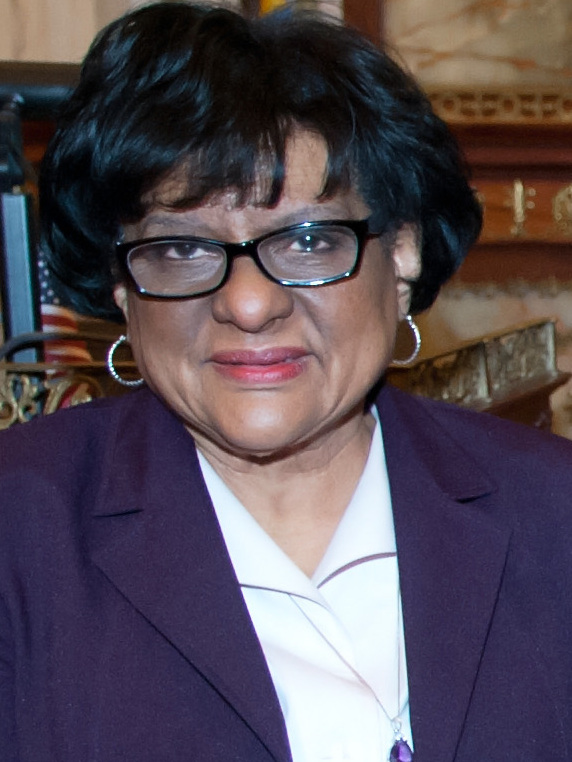

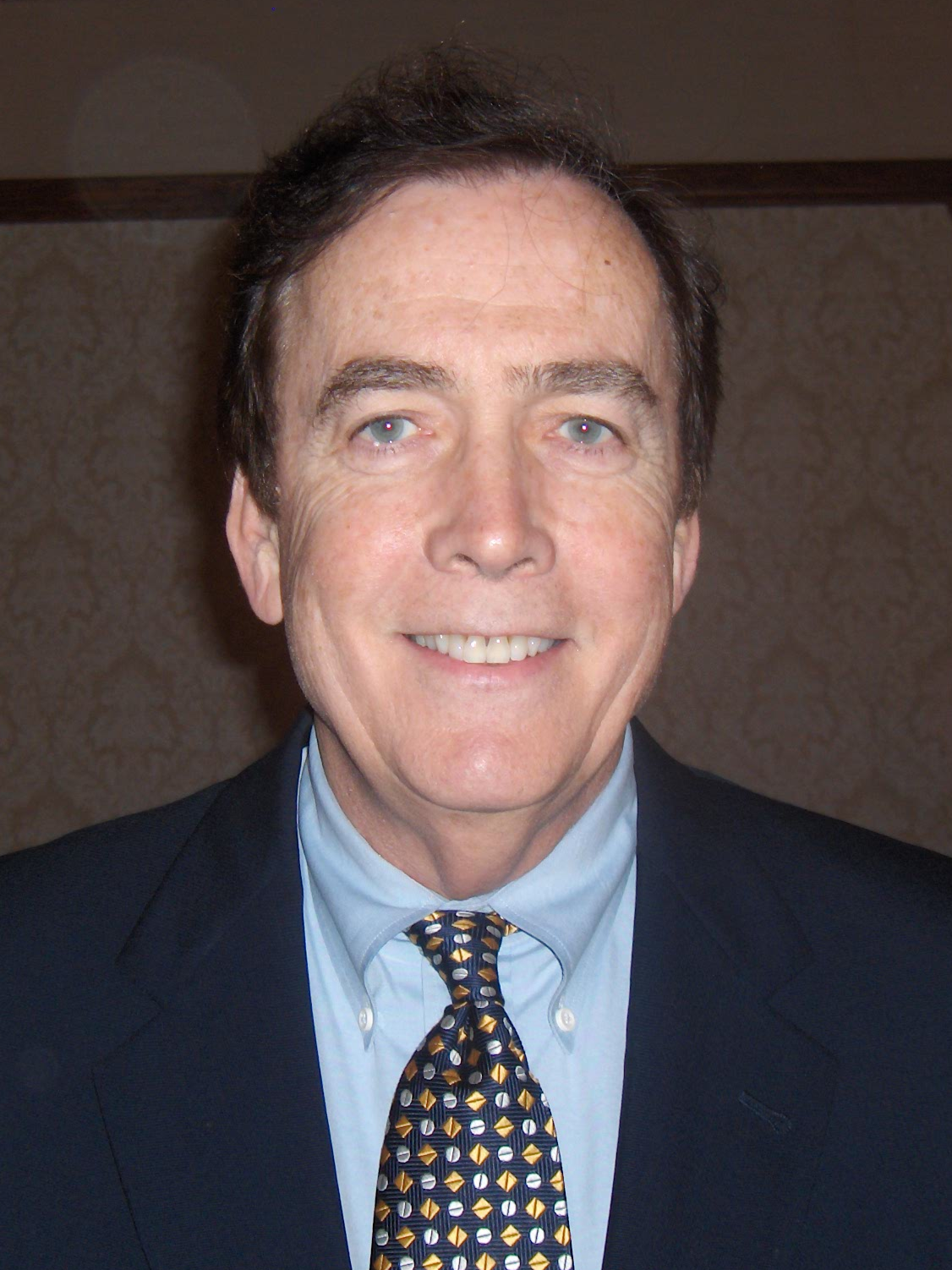
	First party	Second party
Leader	Jannie Blackwell	Brian J. O'Neill
Party	Democratic	Republican
Last election	14 seats	3 seats
Seats before	14	3
Seats won	14	3
Seat change	Steady	Steady
Council President before election
Anna Verna
Democratic
Elected Council President
Anna Verna
Democratic

The 2007 Philadelphia City Council election took place on November 6, 2007, along with the 2007 Philadelphia municipal election. The composition of the Philadelphia City Council remained unchanged from before the election, with Democrats maintaining their 14-3 majority on the council.

== 1st District ==
Incumbent councilmember Frank DiCicco won reelection to a fourth term.

=== Democratic primary ===
==== Nominee ====
- Frank DiCicco, incumbent councilmember (1996–present)

==== Eliminated in primary ====
- Vernon Anastasio

==== Results ====
District 1, 2007 Democratic primary
Party	Candidate	Votes	%
Democratic	Frank DiCicco (incumbent)	16,500	68.33
Democratic	Vernon Anastasio	7,649	31.67
Write-in		0	0.00
Total votes		24,149	100.00

=== Republican primary ===
==== Nominee ====
- Michael L. Seidenberg

==== Results ====
District 1, 2007 Republican primary
Party	Candidate	Votes	%
Republican	Michael L. Seidenberg	1,709	99.94
Write-in		1	0.06
Total votes		1,710	100.00

=== General election ===
==== Results ====
District 1, 2007 general election
Party	Candidate	Votes	%
Democratic	Frank DiCicco (incumbent)	19,632	81.52
Republican	Michael L. Seidenberg	4,443	18.45
Write-in		8	0.03
Total votes		24,083	100.00
Democratic hold			

== 2nd District ==
City Council President Anna Verna won reelection to a ninth term.

=== Democratic primary ===
==== Nominee ====
- Anna Verna, incumbent councilmember (1975–present)

==== Eliminated in primary ====
- Damon K. Roberts

==== Results ====
District 2, 2007 Democratic primary
Party	Candidate	Votes	%
Democratic	Anna Verna (incumbent)	17,517	78.62
Democratic	Damon K. Roberts	4,763	21.38
Write-in		2	0.01
Total votes		22,282	100.00

=== Republican primary ===
==== Nominee ====
- William Black

==== Results ====
District 2, 2007 Republican primary
Party	Candidate	Votes	%
Republican	William Black	808	99.75
Write-in		2	0.25
Total votes		810	100.00

=== General election ===
==== Results ====
District 2, 2007 general election
Party	Candidate	Votes	%
Democratic	Anna Verna (incumbent)	20,237	89.95
Republican	William Black	2,254	10.02
Write-in		8	0.04
Total votes		22,499	100.00
Democratic hold			

== 3rd District ==
Incumbent councilmember and Majority Leader Jannie Blackwell won reelection to a fifth term.

=== Democratic primary ===
==== Nominee ====
- Jannie Blackwell, incumbent councilmember (1992–present)

==== Results ====
District 3, 2007 Democratic primary
Party	Candidate	Votes	%
Democratic	Jannie Blackwell (incumbent)	18,720	99.72
Write-in		53	0.28
Total votes		18,773	100.00

=== Republican primary ===
==== Nominee ====
- Keith A. Hairston Sr.

==== Results ====
District 3, 2007 Republican primary
Party	Candidate	Votes	%
Republican	Keith A. Hairston Sr.	340	99.42
Write-in		2	0.58
Total votes		342	100.00

=== General election ===
==== Results ====
District 3, 2007 general election
Party	Candidate	Votes	%
Democratic	Jannie Blackwell (incumbent)	20,472	92.27
Republican	Keith A. Hairston Sr.	1,689	7.61
Write-in		27	0.12
Total votes		22,188	100.00
Democratic hold			

== 4th District ==
Incumbent councilmember Carol Campbell was defeated by Curtis Jones Jr. in the Democratic primary, amidst fallout from a campaign finance scandal. Jones won the general election to his first term in office.

=== Democratic primary ===
==== Nominee ====
- Curtis Jones Jr., CEO of the Philadelphia Commercial Development Corporation

==== Eliminated in primary ====
- Carol Campbell, incumbent councilmember (2006–present)
- Matthew N. McClure, real estate lawyer
- Alfred J. Sanford

==== Results ====
District 4, 2007 Democratic primary
Party	Candidate	Votes	%
Democratic	Curtis Jones Jr.	9,144	34.87
Democratic	Carol Campbell (incumbent)	8,674	33.08
Democratic	Matthew N. McClure	8,304	31.66
Democratic	Alfred J. Sanford	101	0.39
Write-in		2	0.01
Total votes		26,225	100.00

=== Republican primary ===
==== Nominee ====
- Melvin C. Johnakin

==== Results ====
District 4, 2007 Republican primary
Party	Candidate	Votes	%
Republican	Melvin C. Johnakin	1,159	99.91
Write-in		1	0.09
Total votes		1,160	100.00

=== General election ===
==== Results ====
District 4, 2007 general election
Party	Candidate	Votes	%
Democratic	Curtis Jones Jr.	22,435	86.24
Republican	Melvin C. Johnakin	3,562	13.69
Write-in		17	0.07
Total votes		26,014	100.00
Democratic hold			

== 5th District ==
Incumbent councilmember Darrell L. Clarke won reelection to a third term.

=== Democratic primary ===
==== Nominee ====
- Darrell L. Clarke, incumbent councilmember (1999–present)

==== Eliminated in primary ====
- Haile C. Johnston
- John J. Longacre

==== Results ====
District 5, 2007 Democratic primary
Party	Candidate	Votes	%
Democratic	Darrell L. Clarke (incumbent)	16,107	69.72
Democratic	Haile C. Johnston	4,548	19.69
Democratic	John J. Longacre	2,445	10.58
Write-in		3	0.01
Total votes		23,103	100.00

=== Republican primary ===
==== Results ====
District 5, 2007 Republican primary
Party	Candidate	Votes	%
	Write-in	8	100.00
Total votes		8	100.00

=== General election ===
==== Results ====
District 5, 2007 general election
Party	Candidate	Votes	%
Democratic	Darrell L. Clarke (incumbent)	22,169	99.81
Write-in		42	0.19
Total votes		22,211	100.00
Democratic hold			

== 6th District ==
Longtime incumbent Joan Krajewski won reelection to an eighth term.

=== Democratic primary ===
==== Nominee ====
- Joan Krajewski, incumbent councilmember (1980–present)

==== Results ====
District 6, 2007 Democratic primary
Party	Candidate	Votes	%
Democratic	Joan Krajewski (incumbent)	17,378	99.95
Write-in		8	0.05
Total votes		17,386	100.00

=== Republican primary ===
==== Nominee ====
- Michael Ebsworth

==== Results ====
District 6, 2007 Republican primary
Party	Candidate	Votes	%
Republican	Michael Ebsworth	2,757	99.86
Write-in		4	0.14
Total votes		2,761	100.00

=== General election ===
==== Results ====
District 6, 2007 general election
Party	Candidate	Votes	%
Democratic	Joan Krajewski (incumbent)	19,394	80.85
Republican	Michael Ebsworth	4,592	19.14
Write-in		2	0.01
Total votes		23,988	100.00
Democratic hold			

== 7th District ==
Incumbent Daniel Savage was defeated in the Democratic primary by political activist Maria Quiñones-Sánchez, who previously ran for City Council in 1999. She subsequently won the general election to her first term in office.

=== Democratic primary ===
==== Nominee ====
- Maria Quiñones-Sánchez, former deputy City Commissioner and political activist

==== Eliminated in primary ====
- Daniel Savage, incumbent councilmember (2006–present)
- Marnie Aument Loughrey

==== Results ====
District 7, 2007 Democratic primary
Party	Candidate	Votes	%
Democratic	Maria Quiñones-Sánchez	7,975	52.10
Democratic	Daniel Savage (incumbent)	6,295	41.12
Democratic	Marnie Aument Loughrey	1,035	6.76
Write-in		3	0.02
Total votes		15,308	100.00

=== Republican primary ===
==== Nominee ====
- Gary Grisafi

==== Results ====
District 7, 2007 Republican primary
Party	Candidate	Votes	%
Republican	Gary Grisafi	855	99.88
Write-in		1	0.12
Total votes		856	100.00

=== General election ===
==== Results ====
District 7, 2007 general election
Party	Candidate	Votes	%
Democratic	Maria Quiñones-Sánchez	11,571	78.00
Republican	Gary Grisafi	3,187	21.48
Independent	Luis A. Pineda	73	0.49
Write-in		3	0.02
Total votes		14,834	100.00
Democratic hold			

== 8th District ==
Incumbent Donna Reed Miller won a crowded Democratic primary and the general election for a fourth term in office.

=== Democratic primary ===
==== Nominee ====
- Donna Reed Miller, incumbent councilmember (1996–present)

==== Eliminated in primary ====
- Irv Ackelsberg
- Cindy Bass, senior policy advisor to U.S. Representative Chaka Fattah
- Maurice J. Houston
- Greg Paulmier

==== Results ====
District 8, 2007 Democratic primary
Party	Candidate	Votes	%
Democratic	Donna Reed Miller (incumbent)	9,735	31.58
Democratic	Cindy Bass	8,170	26.50
Democratic	Irv Ackelsberg	7,783	25.24
Democratic	Greg Paulmier	5,106	16.56
Democratic	Maurice J. Houston	33	0.11
Write-in		4	0.01
Total votes		30,831	100.00

=== Republican primary ===
==== Results ====
District 8, 2007 Republican primary
Party	Candidate	Votes	%
	Write-in	5	100.00
Total votes		5	100.00

=== General election ===
==== Results ====
District 8, 2007 general election
Party	Candidate	Votes	%
Democratic	Donna Reed Miller (incumbent)	21,131	75.27
Vote Jesse Brown	Jesse W. Brown Jr.	5,223	18.60
Green	Brian Rudnick	1,126	4.01
Independent	James Foster	590	2.10
Write-in		5	0.02
Total votes		28,075	100.00
Democratic hold			

== 9th District ==
Incumbent councilmember Marian B. Tasco won reelection to a sixth term.

=== Democratic primary ===
==== Nominee ====
- Marian B. Tasco, incumbent councilmember (1988–present)

==== Eliminated in primary ====
- Cecil A. Hankins Sr.
- Raymond T. Jones Jr.
- Lamont Thomas

==== Results ====
District 9, 2007 Democratic primary
Party	Candidate	Votes	%
Democratic	Marian B. Tasco (incumbent)	17,594	71.90
Democratic	Cecil A. Hankins Sr.	2,911	11.90
Democratic	Raymond T. Jones Jr.	2,715	11.09
Democratic	Lamont Thomas	1,249	5.10
Write-in		2	0.01
Total votes		24,471	100.00

=== Republican primary ===
==== Results ====
District 9, 2007 Republican primary
Party	Candidate	Votes	%
	Write-in	6	100.00
Total votes		6	100.00

=== General election ===
==== Results ====
District 9, 2007 general election
Party	Candidate	Votes	%
Democratic	Marian B. Tasco (incumbent)	22,594	99.95
Write-in		11	0.05
Total votes		22,605	100.00
Democratic hold			

== 10th District ==
Longtime incumbent councilmember and Minority Leader Brian J. O'Neill won reelection to an eighth term.

=== Democratic primary ===
==== Nominee ====
- Sean Patrick McAleer

==== Results ====
District 10, 2007 Democratic primary
Party	Candidate	Votes	%
Democratic	Sean Patrick McAleer	14,365	99.97
Write-in		5	0.03
Total votes		14,370	100.00

=== Republican primary ===
==== Nominee ====
- Brian J. O'Neill, incumbent councilmember (1980–present)

==== Results ====
District 10, 2007 Republican primary
Party	Candidate	Votes	%
Republican	Brian J. O'Neill (incumbent)	5,562	99.98
Write-in		1	0.02
Total votes		5,563	100.00

=== General election ===
==== Results ====
District 10, 2007 general election
Party	Candidate	Votes	%
Republican	Brian J. O'Neill (incumbent)	18,129	58.20
Democratic	Sean Patrick McAleer	13,018	41.79
Write-in		2	0.01
Total votes		31,149	100.00
Republican hold			

== At-Large Seats ==
=== Democratic primary ===
==== Results ====
Philadelphia City Council At-Large, 2007 Democratic primary Vote for 5
Party	Candidate	Votes	%
Democratic	Jim Kenney (incumbent)	95,389	13.44
Democratic	W. Wilson Goode Jr. (incumbent)	79,798	11.24
Democratic	William K. Greenlee (incumbent)	63,563	8.96
Democratic	Bill Green IV	62,252	8.77
Democratic	Blondell Reynolds Brown (incumbent)	51,846	7.31
Democratic	Sharif Street	47,879	6.75
Democratic	Benjamin Ramos	47,343	6.67
Democratic	Juan F. Ramos (incumbent)	44,205	6.23
Democratic	Andrew Toy	41,654	5.87
Democratic	Derek S. Green	30,745	4.33
Democratic	Marc Stier	25,078	3.53
Democratic	Matt Ruben	19,946	2.81
Democratic	Wilson Alexander	19,807	2.79
Democratic	Caryn Hunt	18,723	2.64
Democratic	Harry Massele	17,102	2.41
Democratic	Michael K. Ellis	15,254	2.15
Democratic	Milton Street	10,468	1.47
Democratic	Maceo Cummings	9,577	1.35
Democratic	Rodney Little	9,029	1.27
Write-in		62	0.01
Total votes		709,720	100.00

=== Republican primary ===
==== Results ====
Philadelphia Council At-Large, 2007 Republican primary Vote for 5
Party	Candidate	Votes	%
Republican	Frank Rizzo Jr. (incumbent)	15,451	26.94
Republican	Jack Kelly (incumbent)	13,264	23.13
Republican	David Oh	10,230	17.84
Republican	Patricia A. Mattern	9,214	16.07
Republican	Phil Kerwick	9,166	15.98
Write-in		27	0.05
Total votes		57,352	100.00

=== General election ===
==== Results ====
Philadelphia Council At-Large, 2007 General election Vote for 5
Party	Candidate	Votes	%
Democratic	Bill Green IV	165,796	15.96
Democratic	Jim Kenney (incumbent)	165,764	15.96
Democratic	W. Wilson Goode Jr. (incumbent)	160,531	15.46
Democratic	Blondell Reynolds Brown (incumbent)	148,236	14.27
Democratic	William K. Greenlee (incumbent)	135,419	13.04
Republican	Frank Rizzo Jr. (incumbent)	76,937	7.41
Republican	Jack Kelly (incumbent)	61,239	5.90
Republican	David Oh	61,117	5.88
Republican	Patricia A. Mattern	28,729	2.77
Republican	Phil Kerwick	26,362	2.54
Green	Jacinth Brown Roberts	6,043	0.58
Socialist Workers	Osborne Hart	2,284	0.22
Write-in		65	0.01
Total votes		1,038,522	100.00
Democratic hold			
Democratic hold			
Democratic hold			
Democratic hold			
Democratic hold			
Republican hold			
Republican hold			
