= 2003 Philadelphia City Council election =

- November 4, 2003

All 17 seats on the Philadelphia City Council 9 seats needed for a majority
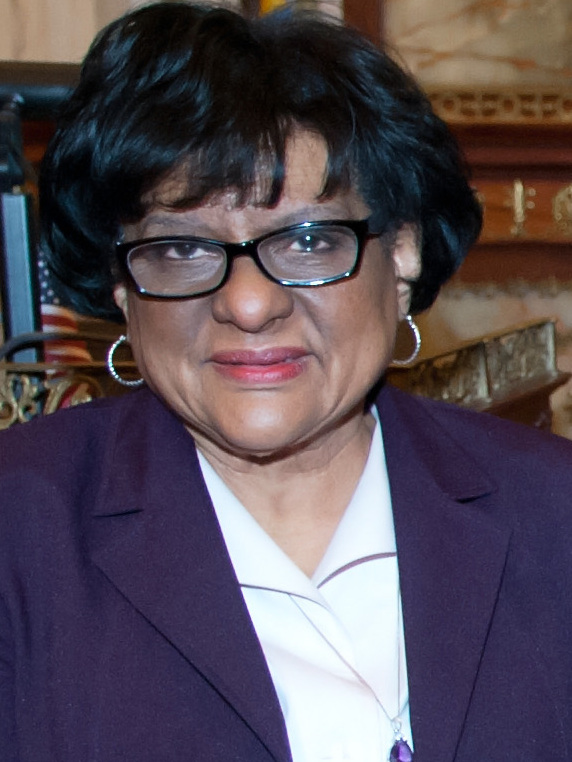

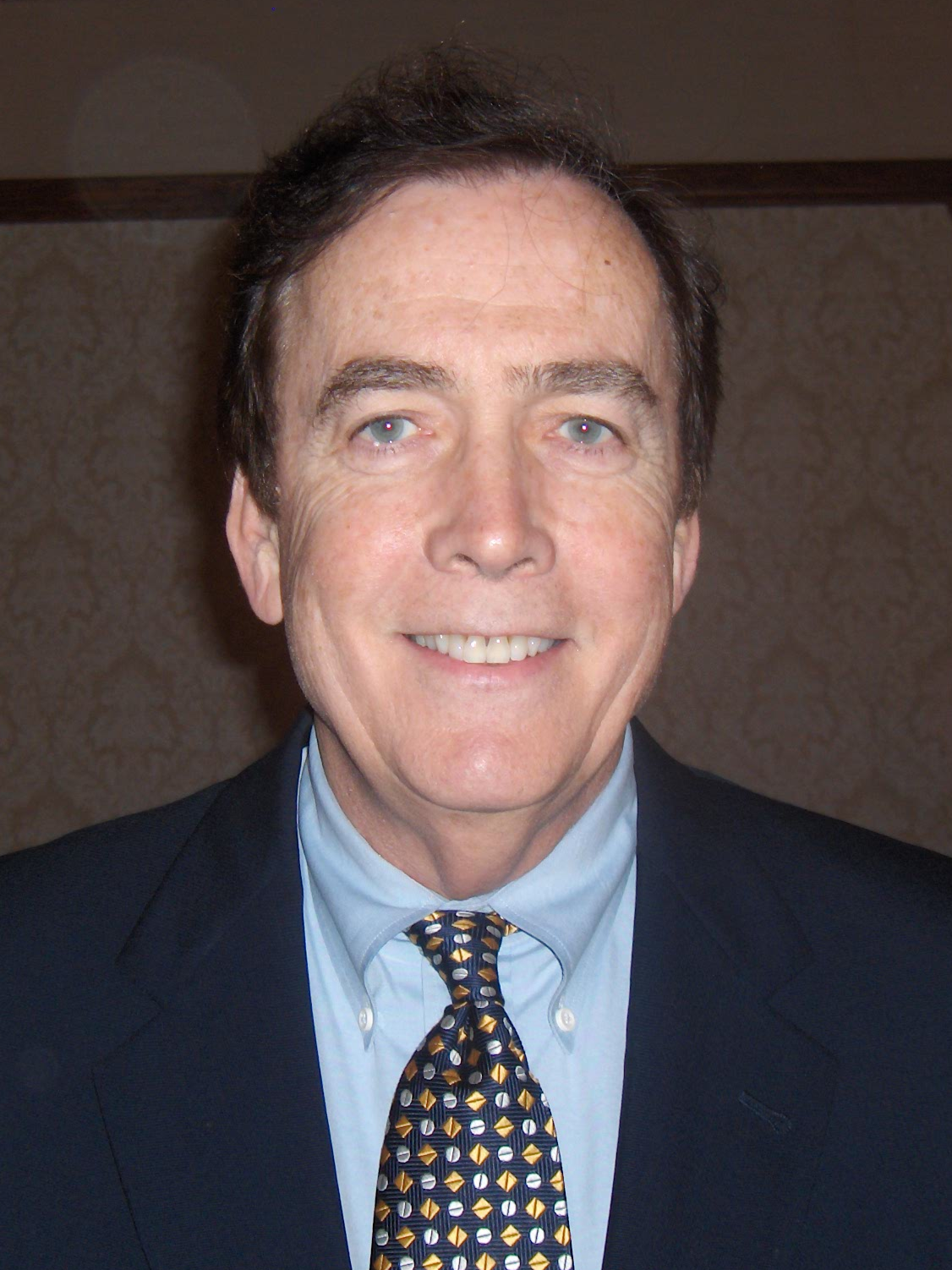
	First party	Second party
Leader	Jannie Blackwell	Brian J. O'Neill
Party	Democratic	Republican
Last election	14 seats	3 seats
Seats before	14	3
Seats won	14	3
Seat change	Steady	Steady
Council President before election
Anna Verna
Democratic
Elected Council President
Anna Verna
Democratic

The 2003 Philadelphia City Council election took place on November 4, 2003, along with the 2003 Philadelphia municipal election. The composition of the Philadelphia City Council remained unchanged from before the election, with Democrats maintaining their 14–3 majority on the council.

== 1st District ==
Incumbent councilmember Frank DiCicco won reelection to a third term.

=== Democratic primary ===
==== Nominee ====
- Frank DiCicco, incumbent councilmember (1996–present)

==== Results ====
District 1, 2003 Democratic primary
Party	Candidate	Votes	%
Democratic	Frank DiCicco (incumbent)	9,336	97.08
Write-in		281	2.92
Total votes		9,617	100.00

=== Republican primary ===
==== Nominee ====
- Rick A. Cataldi

==== Results ====
District 1, 2003 Republican primary
Party	Candidate	Votes	%
Republican	Rick A. Cataldi	1,664	99.70
Write-in		5	0.30
Total votes		1,669	100.00

=== General election ===
==== Results ====
District 1, 2003 general election
Party	Candidate	Votes	%
Democratic	Frank DiCicco (incumbent)	24,720	65.95
Republican	Rick A. Cataldi	12,747	34.01
Write-in		18	0.05
Total votes		37,485	100.00
Democratic hold			

== 2nd District ==
Council President Anna Verna won reelection to an eighth term.

=== Democratic primary ===
==== Nominee ====
- Anna Verna, incumbent councilmember (1975–present)

==== Results ====
District 2, 2003 Democratic primary
Party	Candidate	Votes	%
Democratic	Anna Verna (incumbent)	10,224	99.95
Write-in		5	0.05
Total votes		10,229	100.00

=== Republican primary ===
==== Nominee ====
- Paula A. Terreri

==== Results ====
District 2, 2003 Republican primary
Party	Candidate	Votes	%
Republican	Paula A. Terreri	967	99.90
Write-in		1	0.10
Total votes		968	100.00

=== General election ===
==== Results ====
District 2, 2003 general election
Party	Candidate	Votes	%
Democratic	Anna Verna (incumbent)	31,677	83.42
Republican	Paula A. Terreri	6,291	16.57
Write-in		4	0.01
Total votes		37,972	100.00
Democratic hold			

== 3rd District ==
Incumbent councilmember and Majority Leader Jannie Blackwell won reelection to a fourth term.

=== Democratic primary ===
==== Nominee ====
- Jannie Blackwell, incumbent councilmember (1992–present)

==== Results ====
District 3, 2003 Democratic primary
Party	Candidate	Votes	%
Democratic	Jannie Blackwell (incumbent)	13,172	99.77
Write-in		31	0.23
Total votes		13,203	100.00

=== Republican primary ===
==== Results ====
District 3, 2003 Republican primary
Party	Candidate	Votes	%
	Write-in	7	100.00
Total votes		7	100.00

=== General election ===
==== Results ====
District 3, 2003 general election
Party	Candidate	Votes	%
Democratic	Jannie Blackwell (incumbent)	36,491	99.68
Write-in		117	0.32
Total votes		36,608	100.00
Democratic hold			

== 4th District ==
Incumbent councilmember Michael Nutter won reelection to a fourth term.

=== Democratic primary ===
==== Nominee ====
- Michael Nutter, incumbent councilmember (1992–present)

==== Results ====
District 4, 2003 Democratic primary
Party	Candidate	Votes	%
Democratic	Michael Nutter (incumbent)	12,722	99.99
Write-in		1	0.01
Total votes		12,723	100.00

=== Republican primary ===
==== Nominee ====
- Jay M. Feinschil

==== Results ====
District 4, 2003 Republican primary
Party	Candidate	Votes	%
Republican	Jay M. Feinschil	1,018	100.00
Write-in		0	0.00
Total votes		1,018	100.00

=== General election ===
==== Results ====
District 4, 2003 general election
Party	Candidate	Votes	%
Democratic	Michael Nutter (incumbent)	36,371	84.95
Republican	Jay M. Feinschil	6,442	15.05
Write-in		2	0.00
Total votes		42,815	100.00
Democratic hold			

== 5th District ==
Incumbent councilmember Darrell L. Clarke won reelection to a second term.

=== Democratic primary ===
==== Nominee ====
- Darrell L. Clarke, incumbent councilmember (1999–present)

==== Results ====
District 5, 2003 Democratic primary
Party	Candidate	Votes	%
Democratic	Darrell L. Clarke (incumbent)	11,584	99.92
Write-in		9	0.08
Total votes		11,593	100.00

=== Republican primary ===
==== Results ====
District 5, 2003 Republican primary
Party	Candidate	Votes	%
	Write-in	7	100.00
Total votes		7	100.00

=== General election ===
==== Results ====
District 5, 2003 general election
Party	Candidate	Votes	%
Democratic	Darrell L. Clarke (incumbent)	37,964	99.92
Write-in		30	0.08
Total votes		37,994	100.00
Democratic hold			

== 6th District ==
Incumbent councilmember Joan Krajewski won reelection to a seventh term.

=== Democratic primary ===
==== Nominee ====
- Joan Krajewski, incumbent councilmember (1980–present)

==== Results ====
District 6, 2003 Democratic primary
Party	Candidate	Votes	%
Democratic	Joan Krajewski (incumbent)	8,464	99.91
Write-in		8	0.09
Total votes		8,472	100.00

=== Republican primary ===
==== Nominee ====
- Vandy L. Parks

==== Results ====
District 6, 2003 Republican primary
Party	Candidate	Votes	%
Republican	Vandy L. Parks	2,709	99.49
Write-in		14	0.51
Total votes		2,723	100.00

=== General election ===
==== Results ====
District 6, 2003 general election
Party	Candidate	Votes	%
Democratic	Joan Krajewski (incumbent)	28,190	67.24
Republican	Vandy L. Parks	13,733	32.75
Write-in		4	0.01
Total votes		41,927	100.00
Democratic hold			

== 7th District ==
Incumbent councilmember Richard T. Mariano won reelection to a third term.

=== Democratic primary ===
==== Nominee ====
- Richard T. Mariano, incumbent councilmember (1996–present)

==== Eliminated in primary ====
- Kathleen M. Fitzpatrick

==== Results ====
District 7, 2003 Democratic primary
Party	Candidate	Votes	%
Democratic	Richard T. Mariano (incumbent)	6,223	57.79
Democratic	Kathleen M. Fitzpatrick	4,545	42.21
Write-in		0	0.00
Total votes		10,768	100.00

=== Republican primary ===
==== Nominee ====
- Nestor E. Gonzalez

==== Results ====
District 7, 2003 Republican primary
Party	Candidate	Votes	%
Republican	Nestor E. Gonzalez	908	100.00
Write-in		0	0.00
Total votes		908	100.00

=== General election ===
==== Results ====
District 7, 2003 general election
Party	Candidate	Votes	%
Democratic	Richard T. Mariano (incumbent)	23,541	79.17
Republican	Nestor E. Gonzalez	6,188	20.81
Write-in		5	0.02
Total votes		29,734	100.00
Democratic hold			

== 8th District ==
Incumbent Donna Reed Miller won reelection to a third term.

=== Democratic primary ===
==== Nominee ====
- Donna Reed Miller, incumbent councilmember (1996–present)

==== Eliminated in primary ====
- Marc DeBeary
- Greg Paulmier

==== Results ====
District 8, 2003 Democratic primary
Party	Candidate	Votes	%
Democratic	Donna Reed Miller (incumbent)	8,948	45.29
Democratic	Greg Paulmier	7,257	36.73
Democratic	Marc DeBeary	3,548	17.96
Write-in		3	0.02
Total votes		19,756	100.00

=== Republican primary ===
==== Nominee ====
- Deborah Williams

==== Results ====
District 8, 2003 Republican primary
Party	Candidate	Votes	%
Republican	Deborah Williams	617	99.84
Write-in		1	0.16
Total votes		618	100.00

=== General election ===
==== Results ====
District 8, 2003 general election
Party	Candidate	Votes	%
Democratic	Donna Reed Miller (incumbent)	39,479	84.84
Republican	Deborah Williams	4,021	8.64
Green	Thomas Hutt	3,028	6.51
Write-in		6	0.01
Total votes		46,534	100.00
Democratic hold			

== 9th District ==
Incumbent councilmember Marian B. Tasco won reelection to a fifth term.

=== Democratic primary ===
==== Nominee ====
- Marian B. Tasco, incumbent councilmember (1988–present)

==== Results ====
District 9, 2003 Democratic primary
Party	Candidate	Votes	%
Democratic	Marian B. Tasco (incumbent)	10,925	99.90
Write-in		11	0.10
Total votes		10,936	100.00

=== Republican primary ===
==== Nominee ====
- Matthew T. McKeon

==== Results ====
District 9, 2003 Republican primary
Party	Candidate	Votes	%
Republican	Matthew T. McKeon	847	98.72
Write-in		11	1.28
Total votes		858	100.00

=== General election ===
==== Results ====
District 9, 2003 general election
Party	Candidate	Votes	%
Democratic	Marian B. Tasco (incumbent)	34,205	87.88
Republican	Matthew T. McKeon	4,718	12.12
Write-in		1	0.00
Total votes		38,924	100.00
Democratic hold			

== 10th District ==
Incumbent councilmember and Minority Leader Brian J. O'Neill won reelection to a seventh term.

=== Democratic primary ===
==== Results ====
District 10, 2003 Democratic primary
Party	Candidate	Votes	%
	Write-in	1458	100.00
Total votes		1,458	100.00

=== Republican primary ===
==== Nominee ====
- Brian J. O'Neill, incumbent councilmember (1980–present)

==== Results ====
District 10, 2003 Republican primary
Party	Candidate	Votes	%
Republican	Brian J. O'Neill (incumbent)	5,049	99.68
Write-in		16	0.32
Total votes		5,065	100.00

=== General election ===
==== Results ====
District 10, 2003 general election
Party	Candidate	Votes	%
Republican	Brian J. O'Neill (incumbent)	31,124	65.23
Democratic	Robert McCarthy	16,586	34.76
Write-in		4	0.01
Total votes		47,714	100.00
Republican hold			

== At-Large Seats ==
=== Democratic primary ===
==== Results ====
Philadelphia City Council At-Large, 2003 Democratic primary Vote for 5
Party	Candidate	Votes	%
Democratic	Blondell Reynolds Brown (incumbent)	70,167	17.14
Democratic	W. Wilson Goode Jr. (incumbent)	66,079	16.14
Democratic	David Cohen (incumbent)	66,027	16.13
Democratic	Jim Kenney (incumbent)	58,190	14.21
Democratic	Juan F. Ramos	36,094	8.82
Democratic	Angel L. Ortiz (incumbent)	34,860	8.52
Democratic	Michael Driscoll	26,805	6.55
Democratic	Daniel P. Pellicciotti Sr.	24,162	5.90
Democratic	Joseph M. Grace	14,452	3.53
Democratic	Peter Fiorentino	12,396	3.03
Write-in		125	0.03
Total votes		409,357	100.00

=== Republican primary ===
==== Results ====
Philadelphia Council At-Large, 2003 Republican primary Vote for 5
Party	Candidate	Votes	%
Republican	Frank Rizzo Jr. (incumbent)	16,380	29.46
Republican	Jack Kelly	13,689	24.62
Republican	David P. Hardy	9,995	17.98
Republican	Jamie McDermott	8,751	15.74
Republican	David Oh	6,664	11.99
Write-in		122	0.22
Total votes		55,601	100.00

=== General election ===
==== Results ====
Philadelphia Council At-Large, 2003 General election Vote for 5
Party	Candidate	Votes	%
Democratic	Jim Kenney (incumbent)	274,053	14.83
Democratic	David Cohen (incumbent)	266,994	14.45
Democratic	W. Wilson Goode Jr. (incumbent)	258,423	13.98
Democratic	Juan F. Ramos	250,149	13.54
Democratic	Blondell Reynolds Brown (incumbent)	244,096	13.21
Republican	Frank Rizzo Jr. (incumbent)	145,852	7.89
Republican	Jack Kelly	113,298	6.13
Republican	Jamie McDermott	106,544	5.77
Republican	David Oh	98,687	5.34
Republican	David P. Hardy	83,965	4.54
Education	Will Mega	3,854	0.21
Socialist Workers	Hilda Cuzco	1,823	0.10
Write-in		212	0.21
Total votes		1,847,950	100.00
Democratic hold			
Democratic hold			
Democratic hold			
Democratic hold			
Democratic hold			
Republican hold			
Republican hold			
