= Maria Quiñones-Sánchez =

American politician (born 1968)

Maria Quiñones Sánchez
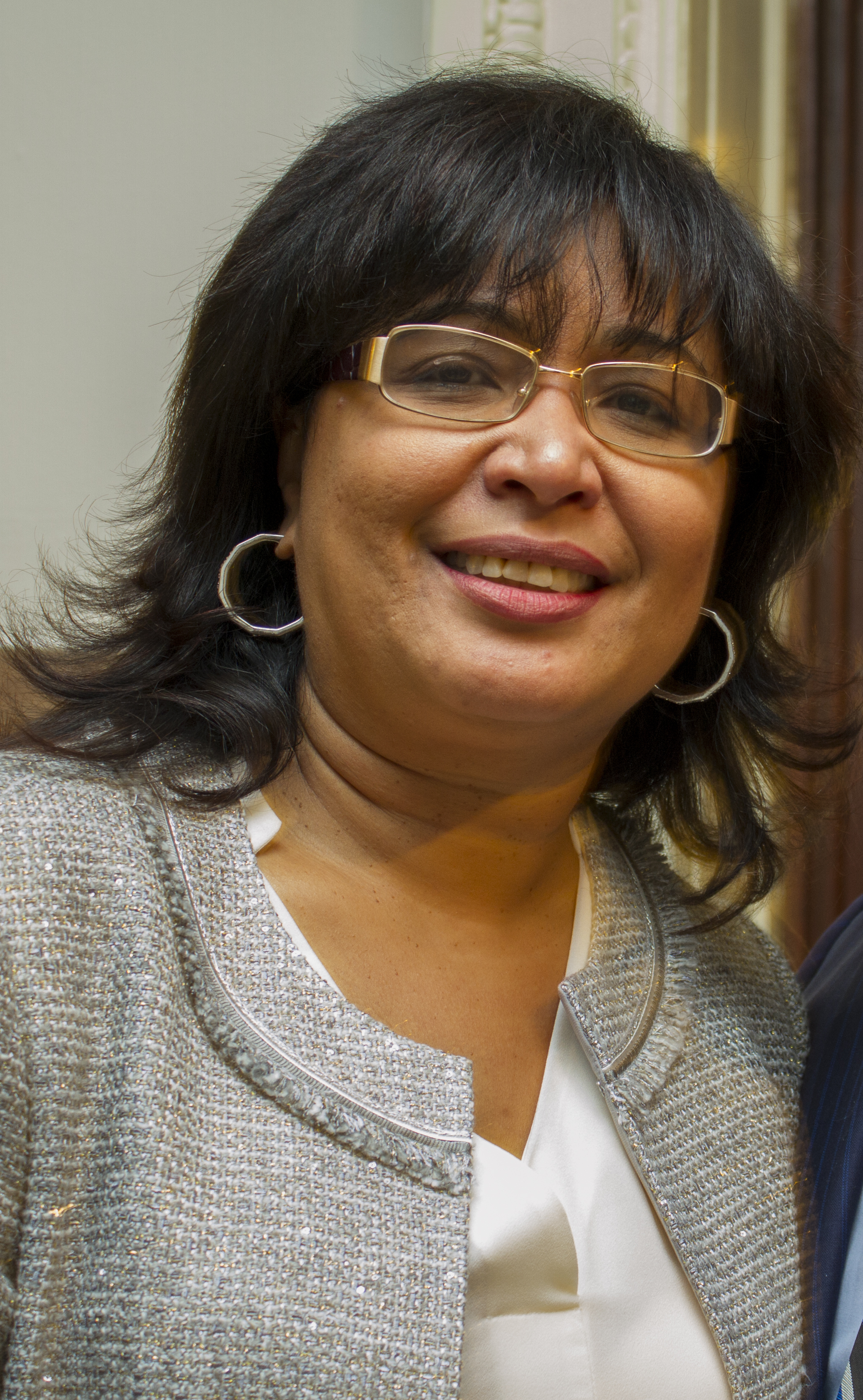
- Quiñones-Sánchez in 2016

Member of the Philadelphia City Council from the 7th district
- In office January 7, 2008 – September 6, 2022
- Preceded by: Daniel J. Savage
- Succeeded by: Quetcy Lozada

Personal details
- Born: November 21, 1968 (age 57) Puerto Rico
- Party: Democratic
- Spouse: Tomas Sánchez
- Education: Temple University (attended); Lincoln University (MHS)
- Occupation: Politician; community activist; political activist; public servant
- Website: City Council page Campaign website

Maria Quiñones-Sánchez (born November 21, 1968) is an American politician and political activist who served as a member of the Philadelphia City Council representing the 7th district. The district includes the neighborhoods of Castor Gardens, Fairhill, Feltonville, Frankford, Harrowgate, Hunting Park, Juniata, Kensington, Oxford Circle and Wissinoming. A registered Democrat, she served in this position from 2008 to 2022.

Quiñones-Sánchez was born in Puerto Rico and moved to Philadelphia when she was six months old. Prior to her election as a member of City Council, she worked in local politics as an advisor to Councilmember Marian B. Tasco and as Philadelphia's Deputy Elections Commissioner. Her election to City Council made her the first Latina elected to the City Council in Philadelphia's history.

In 2022, she resigned from city council to run for Mayor of Philadelphia in the 2023 election. She withdrew before the Democratic primary was held, endorsing eventual winner Cherelle Parker.

== Early life and education ==
Maria Quiñones-Sánchez was born in Puerto Rico on November 21, 1968. In 1969, at six months old, she moved to Philadelphia, along with her mother and two older brothers, to be closer to her father, who worked as a seasonal farmworker. However, Quiñones-Sánchez's parents separated at a young age following her father's struggle with alcoholism. Therefore, she was raised by her single mother, a factory worker, along with her two siblings, older brothers Jaime and David. Her mother was also the matriarch to her own 17 siblings. Quiñones-Sánchez was raised in public housing in the Spring Garden neighborhood of Philadelphia. In the early 1970s, her family was able to buy a home in Hunting Park.

Quiñones-Sánchez attended Jules E. Mastbaum Area Vocational Technical School for high school where she studied business. She served as President of the school's chapter of the ASPIRA Association, a nonprofit organization dedicated to developing leaders in the Latino community. Starting in high school, Quiñones-Sánchez spent time as a member of ASPIRA's leadership programs and served as President of the club's Federation, which allowed her to serve on the local and national Board of Directors.

Quiñones-Sánchez enrolled at Temple University for college. As a journalism major at Temple, Quiñones-Sánchez covered local elections and published investigative pieces on political corruption in Philadelphia for a local community newspaper. During her freshman year, she temporarily left school to give birth to her son and to later take a job with City Councilmember Marian B. Tasco. She later completed a Master's of Human Services degree from Lincoln University, a degree completion program for working professionals. She is an honorary member of Lambda Theta Alpha Latin Sorority, Incorporated.

== Early political career ==
Quiñones-Sánchez's first job in politics was with City Councilmember Marian B. Tasco where she started as a clerk and went on to become Community Liaison. Quiñones-Sánchez specifically focused on writing legislation to address workforce development and create summer jobs in Philadelphia. In 1990, Quiñones-Sánchez worked for Allyson Schwartz's successful campaign for the Pennsylvania State Senate. Following her work with Tasco and Schwartz, Quiñones-Sánchez began working for the office of the Philadelphia City Commissioners and served as Philadelphia's Deputy Elections Commissioner. Her tenure in that position was highlighted by successful efforts to rewrite the city's voting guide and the introduction of new voting machines.

In 1996, Quiñones-Sánchez returned to ASPIRA Pennsylvania where she served as the executive director for four years. Quiñones-Sánchez helped restructure the organization, which was financially struggling, via a negotiated settlement with the IRS. While leading ASPIRA, Quiñones-Sánchez created the Eugenio Maria de Hostos Community Charter School, the first bilingual charter school in Pennsylvania. Quiñones-Sánchez unsuccessfully ran for City Council in 1999 against incumbent Richard T. Mariano. In 2001, she co-founded the Pennsylvania Statewide Latino Coalition. That same year she was named the Regional Director of the Puerto Rico Federal Affairs Administration. Under her watch, the administration launched a 12 city voter registration program that registered more than 32,000 new voters and increased Latino voter turnout by more than 35% in specific areas. Additionally, in the role of Regional Director she led successful efforts to create bilingual ballots in several cities throughout Pennsylvania.

== Philadelphia City Council (2008-2022) ==
A self-described pragmatic progressive, Quiñones-Sánchez ran for Philadelphia City Council in 2007. In the overwhelmingly Democratic 7th District, Quiñones-Sánchez, with endorsements from Governor Ed Rendell and The Philadelphia Inquirer, garnered 52% of the vote and defeated incumbent Danny Savage in the primary election. She won the general election with nearly 80% of the vote and was inaugurated on January 6, 2008.

In the 2011 Democratic primary for District 7, Quiñones-Sánchez faced Savage in a rematch. Savage received support from the Philadelphia Democratic Party and the powerful union leader, Johnny Dougherty. However, Quiñones-Sánchez's once again defeated Savage and won by greater margins than in 2007.

In 2015, Quiñones-Sánchez faced a primary challenge from Manny Morales, who was backed by Dougherty. However, Quiñones-Sánchez defeated Morales with 53% of the vote. Quiñones-Sánchez was mostly recently re-elected in 2019 after surviving a close primary challenge from longtime state representative Angel Cruz, also Dougherty ally and Democratic Party official.

=== Affordable housing ===
In 2019, Quiñones-Sánchez championed a public-private partnership to develop 240 new affordable housing units on abandoned lots in Kensington. That same year, in a move to prevent the gentrification of historic neighborhoods, she helped pass legislation that required 20% of new housing development in parts of North Philadelphia to be affordable housing. In 2018, alongside City Council President Darrell L. Clarke, Quiñones-Sánchez brought together a coalition of developers, affordable housing advocates and community members to create an plan that designated $100 million for affordable housing.

=== Opioid epidemic ===
Quiñones-Sánchez represents Kensington, which is one of the hardest hit areas by the opioid epidemic. She has called for a holistic solution to the epidemic. Quiñones-Sánchez has invested more resources in the Philadelphia Police Department to stop the flow of drugs into the city and close open-air drug markets.

=== Police reform ===
Having previously served on the Police Oversight Committee, Quiñones-Sánchez joined 13 other members of the Philadelphia City Council, following the murder of George Floyd in 2020, in opposing Mayor Jim Kenney's budget proposal that would increase the police department's budget by $14 million. She has called for the Philadelphia Police Department to eliminate the use of chokeholds on suspects and the policy of stop and frisk.

=== Political corruption ===
Quiñones-Sánchez long butted heads with Business Manager Johnny Dougherty of Local 98 of the International Brotherhood of Electrical Workers. Following Dougherty's conviction on charges of conspiracy to commit fraud and wire fraud, she was one of the few members of Philadelphia's City Council to condemn him. She also called on Councilman Bobby Henon to resign in the aftermath of his bribery conviction.

=== Sugary drink tax ===
Quiñones-Sánchez opposes Philadelphia's sugary drink tax that was championed by Mayor Jim Kenney. She voted against the tax in 2016 and introduced legislation to conduct research on the impact of the tax on poor Philadelphians and small businesses. Quiñones-Sánchez opposes the tax on the grounds that it is a regressive tax on the poorest Philadelphians. She has stated “If it’s a beverage tax, let’s make it a beverage tax so the $7 latte is also taxed. But when you say to poor people the only way we can save you is by taxing you and then I’m going to drink my $7 latte and not pay a tax on that, well, that’s just your privilege talking. That is unacceptable."

=== Vacant lots ===
In 2013, Quiñones-Sánchez spearheaded legislation to create a land bank in Philadelphia that would allow the municipal government to acquire vacant lots for development. Quiñones-Sánchez's legislation required that the land bank create a yearly plan to ensure that the development of vacant lots are done equitably.

=== Workers rights ===
In 2019, Quiñones-Sánchez introduced legislation that was signed into law by Mayor Kenney, which increased protections for domestic workers including house keepers. The legislation required that employers enter into a contract laying out employment terms and rates of pay for domestic workers.

== Personal life ==
Quiñones-Sánchez lives in the Norris Square neighborhood in North Philadelphia and has two children with her husband, Tomas. In October 2021, Quiñones-Sánchez announced that she was diagnosed with breast cancer in May 2021, but had successfully undergone a mastectomy and was cancer free.

== See also ==
- List of members of Philadelphia City Council since 1952

Political offices
Preceded by Daniel J. Savage	Member of the Philadelphia Council from the 7th district 2008–present	Incumbent
