= William Greenlee =

William Greenlee may refer to:

- Gus Greenlee (William Augustus Greenlee, 1893–1952), African-American businessman and Negro league baseball owner
- William Brooks Greenlee, American scholar, author and academic
- William K. Greenlee, Democratic Councilman-at-Large on the City Council of Philadelphia, Pennsylvania
