= William Cibotti =

American politician

William Cibotti was a member of Philadelphia City Council representing the 2nd District from 1968 to 1975. He died of a heart attack in 1975. His daughter, Anna Verna, was elected to his seat following his death.
