= Daniel P. McElhatton =

Member of the Philadelphia City Council from the 7th District
- In office 1992–1996
- Preceded by: Jack Kelly
- Succeeded by: Richard T. Mariano

Personal details
- Born: 1949 (age 76–77) Germantown, Philadelphia
- Party: Democratic

Daniel P. McElhatton is a Democratic politician and former member of the City Council of Philadelphia, Pennsylvania.

== Early life and education ==
McElhatton was born in Germantown, Philadelphia and grew up in Juniata Park. He graduated from Northeast Catholic High School in 1967, Villanova University (B.A.) in 1971, and Temple University School of Law (J.D.) in 1974.

== Career ==
McElhatton began his career clerking for a federal judge and then working as an assistant district attorney from 1975 to 1978. In 1991, he won a seat on Philadelphia City Council from the 7th district defeating Republican incumbent Jack Kelly winning by a narrow margin. He lost four years later to Rick Mariano. In 2009 he ran for district attorney on a message of ethical reform and reducing crime. He was endorsed by the Philadelphia Daily News, but lost the race to Seth Williams. He also worked in private practice focusing on civil and trial law.
