= Francis Millet Rogers =

American scholar of Portuguese and other Romance languages

- Born: 26 November 1914; New Bedford, Massachusetts, United States
- Died: 15 August 1989 (aged 74); Morristown, New Jersey, United States
- Occupations: Author, Academic
- Known for: Historical writing

Academic background
- Education: Harvard University

Academic work
- Discipline: History

Francis Millet Rogers (26 November 1914 – 15 August 1989) was an American scholar of Portuguese and other Romance languages. He is notable for having held the first named professorship of the Portuguese language at any American university.

== Life ==
He was born on 26 November 1914 in New Bedford, Massachusetts.

He married Elsie Rogers; they had a daughter.

He died on 15 August 1989 in Morristown, New Jersey.

== Education ==
He completed his BA degree at Cornell University in 1936.

He completed his PhD at Harvard University in 1940. His doctoral dissertation was on pronunciation in the Azores and Madeira.

He also received several honorary degrees from several universities in North America and South America.

== Career ==
=== Military career ===
He served as a lieutenant colonel in the Marine Corps during the Second World War. He received a Silver Star for his military service. He was also made a chevalier of the French legion of honor for his military service.

=== Academic career ===
He served as the Nancy Clark Smith Professor the Language and Literature of Portugal at Harvard University.

He supervised the doctoral dissertations of several students, among whom the most notable was William Brooks Greenlee who was a renowned scholar of Portuguese and Brazilian history.

He retired from his teaching career in 1981.

He became a trustee of St. John's Seminary in Brighton from 1968 to 1973.

== Bibliography ==
He is the author of a number of notable books:

- Americans of Portuguese descent : a lesson in differentiation
- Precision astrolabe; Portuguese navigators and transoceanic aviation
- Higher education in the United States : a summary view
- Internationalism and the three Portugals
- A literary note concerning tides and ptolemy
- From linguistics to literature : Romance studies
