= Mark Squilla =

American politician

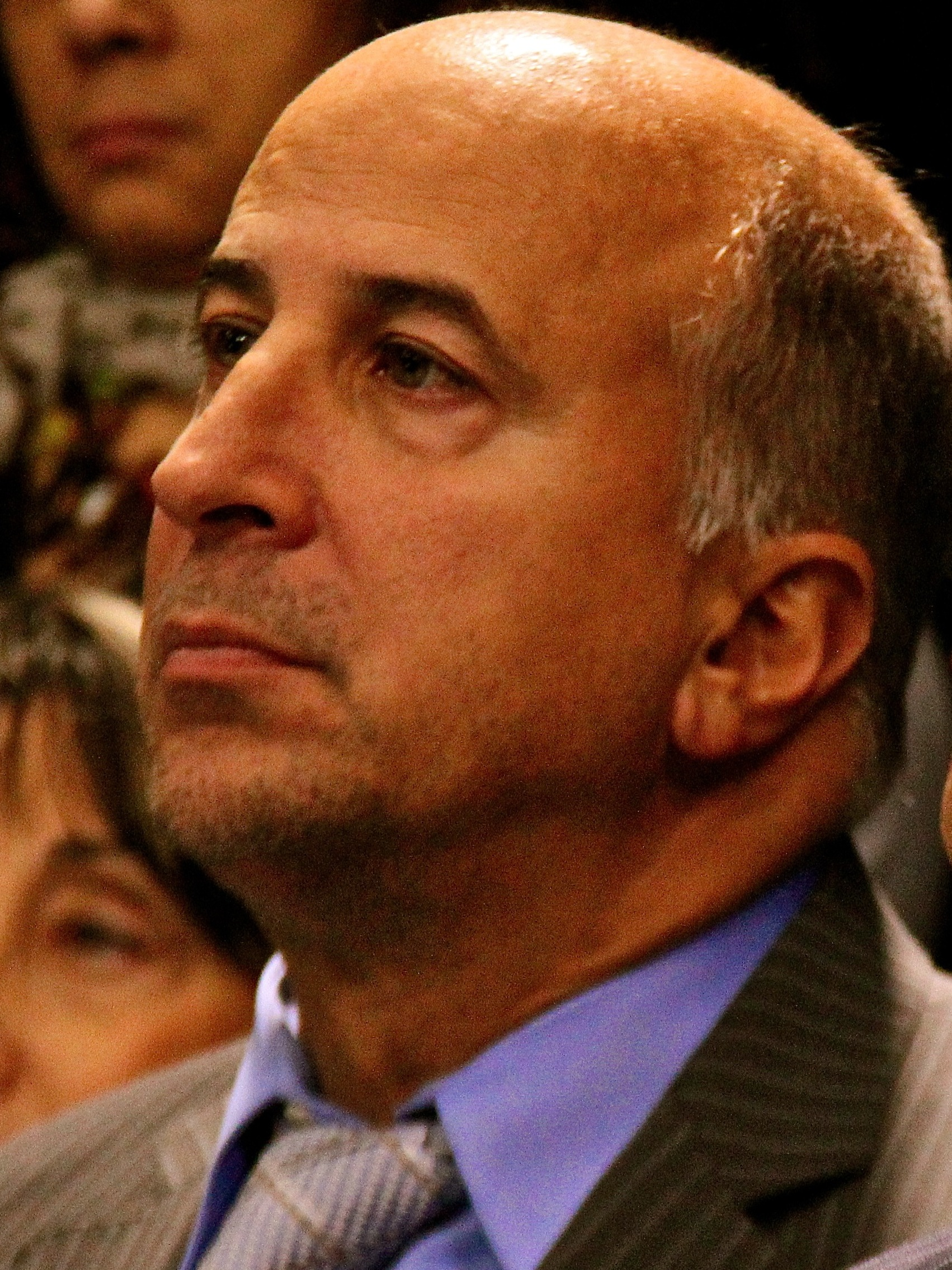
- Squilla in 2012

Member of the Philadelphia City Council from the 1st District
- Incumbent
- Assumed office January 2, 2012
- Preceded by: Frank DiCicco

Personal details
- Born: October 10, 1962 (age 63) Philadelphia, Pennsylvania, U.S.
- Party: Democratic
- Spouse: Brigid
- Children: 4
- Education: La Salle University
- Profession: Computer Programmer

Mark F. Squilla (born October 10, 1962) is a Democratic politician and member of the City Council of Philadelphia, Pennsylvania.

== Early life and education ==
Squilla was born in Whitman, Philadelphia. He graduated from St. John Neumann High School in 1980 and La Salle University in 1985 with a bachelors in computer science.

== Political career ==
Squilla is active in Philadelphia Democratic politics, having held a variety of positions. In the 2004 Democratic primary, he unsuccessfully challenged incumbent State Representative William Keller for a seat in the State House. In 2011, he ran for City Council, seeking to succeed retiring Democrat Frank DiCicco in the First District. He ultimately came out on-top of a four-man Democratic primary field, and faced no opposition in the general election.

== Personal life ==
Squilla's wife, Brigid, is a nurse anesthetist. The couple married in 1989 and have four children.

== See also ==
- List of members of Philadelphia City Council since 1952
