= William Brooks Greenlee =

American scholar of Portuguese and Brazilian history

- Born: 1872; Chicago, Illinois, United States
- Died: 1953 (aged 80–81); Illinois, United States
- Occupations: Author, Academic
- Known for: Historical writing
- Spouse: Adeline Benham Fargo Greenlee
- Children: 3

Academic background
- Education: Harvard University
- Doctoral advisor: Francis Millet Rogers

Academic work
- Discipline: History
- Website: onlinebooks.library.upenn.edu/webbin/book/lookupid?key=ha001165797

William Brooks Greenlee (1872–1953) was an American scholar of Portuguese and Brazilian history. He is known for his biography of the Portuguese explorer Pedro Álvares Cabral.

== Life ==
He was born on 25 April 1872 in Chicago, Cook County, Illinois. He married Adeline Benham Fargo Greenlee and had three children with her. He died on March 1, 1953 in Illinois.

== Education ==
He studied under professor Francis Millet Rogers at Harvard University.

== Career ==
He took up writing as a career and wrote a number of historical books on Portuguese and Brazilian history.

He was a trustee of the Newberry Library. After his death, his entire collection of books was transferred to the Newberry Library. His collection of books contains more than 200 Portuguese manuscripts, dating from 1660 to 1815.

== Bibliography ==
He is the author of a number of notable books:

- The Voyage Of Pedro Álvares Cabral To Brazil And India
- Bartolomeu Dias
- The Captaincy of the Second Portuguese Voyage to Brazil
- Mechanical Experiments in Geology
- A Descriptive Bibliography of the History of Portugal
- The First Half Century of Brazilian History
