= Augusta Clark =

American politician (1932–2013)

Member of the Philadelphia City Council at-large
- In office 1980–2000
- Preceded by: Earl Vann
- Succeeded by: Blondell Reynolds Brown

Personal details
- Born: March 5, 1932 Uniontown, Alabama
- Died: October 13, 2013 (aged 81) Wynnewood, Pennsylvania
- Party: Democratic
- Education: Temple University; Drexel University; West Virginia State College

Augusta "Gussie" Clark (March 5, 1932 – October 13, 2013) was an American librarian, lawyer and politician. Clark was elected to an at-large seat on the Philadelphia City Council in 1979, becoming the second African-American woman to serve on the city council. (Ethel D. Allen, who served on the council from 1972 to 1979, was Philadelphia's first African-American councilwoman.) Clark served on the Philadelphia City Council from 1980 until her retirement in 2000.

== Biography ==
=== Early life ===
Clark was born Augusta Alexander on March 5, 1932, in Uniontown, Alabama, to Harrison and Lula B. Alexander. She was raised in Fairmont, West Virginia, and earned her bachelor's degree from West Virginia State College, now known as West Virginia State University. She met her future husband, Leroy W. Clark, while both were students at West Virginia State, though they did not marry until 1960, when both were living in Philadelphia, Pennsylvania. The couple had two children, Mark and Adrienne. She had moved to Philadelphia after college for professional reasons. She was a member of the Bright Hope Baptist Church from 1954 until 2013.

=== Career ===
Clark moved to Philadelphia when she was hired as an assistant on the now defunct Color magazine. Color, which was based on Life magazine, was targeted for African-American readers. However, Color folded and went out-of business. Clark became a graduate student at Drexel University soon after the magazine's closure, where she received a master's degree in library science. She worked as a librarian in Philadelphia. Clark next enrolled at the Temple University Beasley School of Law when she was 39 years old and earned her law degree.

Clark worked as on the election campaign of William H. Gray, who was elected to the United States House of Representatives in 1978. Philadelphia community and political figures encouraged her to run for a seat on the Philadelphia City Council the following year. Augusta Clark was elected as a Democratic councilwoman-at-large in 1979, becoming only the second African-American woman to serve on the city council.

Clark served on the Philadelphia City Council, representing a citywide at-large seat, from 1980 to 2000. She became the chair of the council's Education Committee for twelve years. She was known as a vocal advocate for the School District of Philadelphia. She was an opponent of school vouchers, arguing the program would remove money from the public school system. Clark allied with the then-President of the Philadelphia City Council, John F. Street, to pass a 10% liquor tax, which was used as an additional source of revenue for public schools. Clark chaired the Public Property and Public Works Committee and served as the city council's Democratic majority whip for a time.

Clark retired from the city council in 2000. In a 2000 interview with The Philadelphia Inquirer, Clark explained that she felt it was the right time to retire, saying, "I think elected office is like poker...I think you have to know when to hold them and know when to fold them. And when you feel you have amassed a body of work that satisfies you."

Augusta Clark died at Lankenau Medical Center in Wynnewood, Pennsylvania, on October 13, 2013, at the age of 81. She was survived by her two children, Mark and Adrienne, and four grandchildren. Her husband, Leroy W. Clark, died in 2007.
