= Cindy Bass =

Philadelphia City Council member (born 1967)

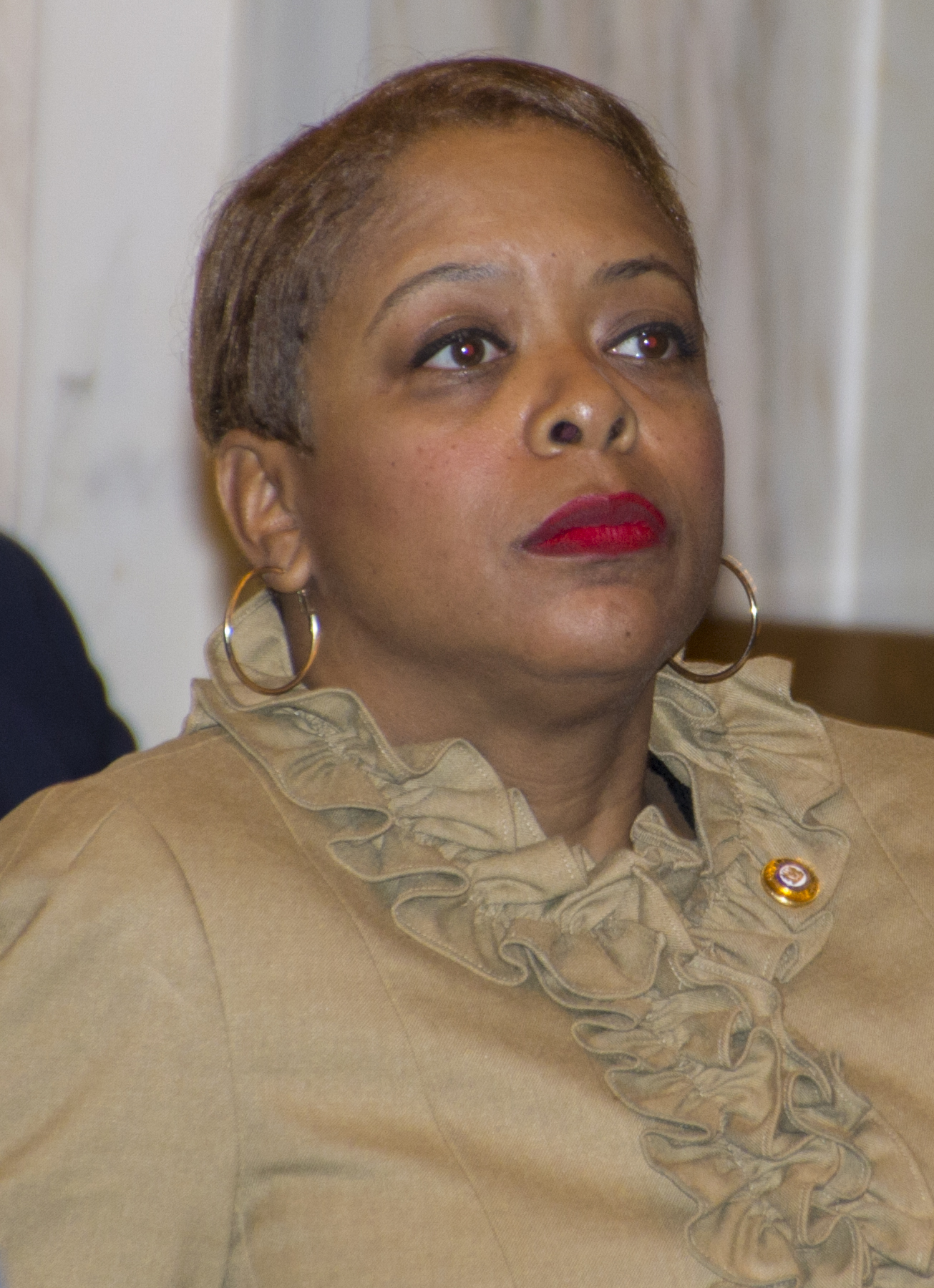
- Bass in 2016

Member of the Philadelphia City Council from the 8th District
- Incumbent
- Assumed office January 2, 2012
- Preceded by: Donna Reed Miller

Personal details
- Born: November 4, 1967 (age 58)
- Party: Democratic
- Spouse: Divorced
- Children: One
- Education: Temple University
- Profession: Politician, political assistant, community organizer

Cindy M. Bass (born November 4, 1967) is a Democratic politician and member of the City Council of Philadelphia.

== Personal life ==
Bass grew up in North Philadelphia and graduated from Parkway-Northwest High School and Temple University. She served as chair of the Coalition of 100 Black Women, was involved with Mt. Airy USA and worked as a community loan officer. In 2005, she started the Northwest Fund, a non-profit that funds neighborhood groups.

Bass is divorced and lives with her daughter in Mount Airy.

== Political career ==
Bass has worked as a senior policy advisor to former Congressman Chaka Fattah, and was a special assistant to Allyson Schwartz during her time in the State Senate. She has been involved in community organizing, helping marshal funds for local projects and efforts.

She has worked as a campaign manager for former Philadelphia City Council member Blondell Reynolds Brown. She also ran unsuccessfully for Pennsylvania State Senate.

She first ran for City Council's Eighth District in 2007 with the support of Chaka Fattah and the endorsement of the Philadelphia Daily News but lost to incumbent Democrat Donna Reed Miller. She placed second in a four way primary.

She ran for the Eighth District seat again in 2011 after Donna Reed Miller's retirement. In the primary she received endorsements from Michael Nutter, The Philadelphia Tribune, The Philadelphia Inquirer, Philadelphia Daily News, R. Seth Williams and others. She won the eight-way race with 39.4% of the vote. In 2018 she became the Democratic party leader for Philadelphia's 22nd ward.

When she ran for re-election in 2023, The Philadelphia Inquirer endorsed her challenger Seth Anderson-Oberman. While noting Bass' achievements including advocating for LGBT adoption rights and securing resources for underserved areas of her district, the editorial board wrote that her tenure was marred by several significant missteps including appointing a board member who was later convicted of embezzlement, selecting an unqualified developer to restore the Germantown YWCA, and proposing legislation to remove bulletproof glass that could have gotten someone killed. Bass won the primary by about 400 votes, and was elected to a fourth term in November 2023.

On June 8, 2026, as incumbent ward leader, Bass chaired a meeting of the 22nd Ward Democratic Committee for the election of ward leader in which she was standing for re-election. Bass faced a well-organized challenge from Octavius Price. Following a voice vote without a clear winner, despite calls for a roll call vote and the party's rules requiring roll call to be conducted when requested, Bass declared herself the winner and ended the meeting. The Democratic City Committee ordered the election to be run again. When it was, Bass and Price tied, and after a series of closed-door meetings, they came to an agreement where Bass would serve as ward leader and Price would serve as ward chair, the number two position.

== Philadelphia City Council ==
=== Stop-and-go bill ===
In November 2017, Bass introduced a bill that would force establishments listed as restaurants, but do not have public bathrooms or seating for 30 people, to remove the bulletproof glass that protects employees from getting shot and stabbed by their customers. This earned controversy from the store owners – most who are Korean Americans – who felt they were being "targeted". The bill was passed by City Council prompting heated exchanges between Asian Americans, who are the primary business owner of these stores, and African Americans, who experience litter and nuisance behavior from store patrons who purchase alcohol and consume it outside the store.

== See also ==
- List of members of Philadelphia City Council since 1952
