= Bobby Henon =

American politician

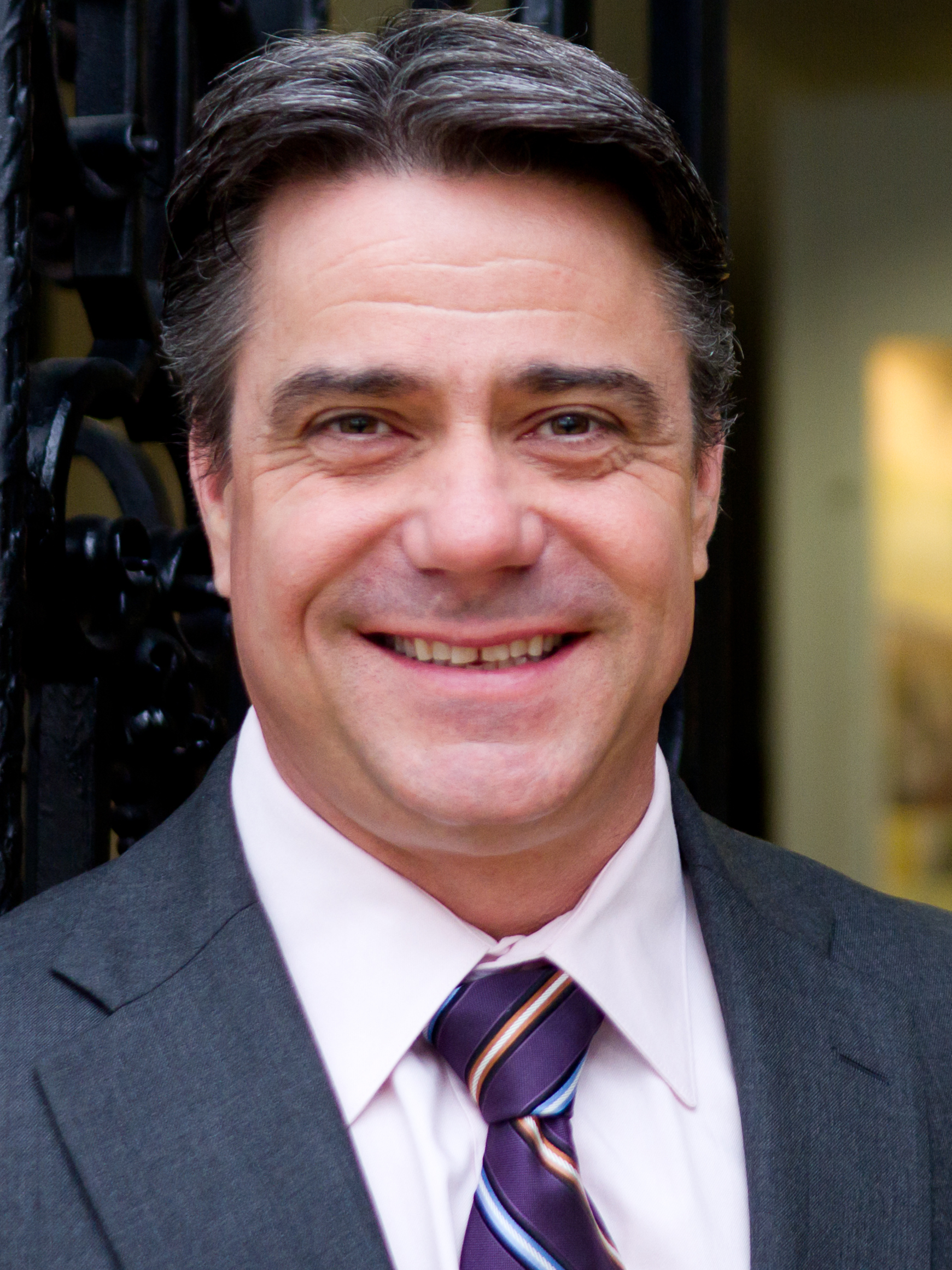

Member of the Philadelphia City Council from the 6th District
- In office January 2, 2012 – January 20, 2022
- Preceded by: Joan Krajewski
- Succeeded by: Michael Driscoll

Personal details
- Born: January 11, 1969 (age 57)
- Party: Democratic
- Spouse: Jill
- Children: 2
- Profession: Politician, Union official, Electrician
- Criminal information
- Criminal charges: Conspiracy to commit fraud, wire fraud and bribery
- Penalty: Sentenced to 42 months in prison

Bobby Henon (born January 11, 1969) is an American former politician. He was a Democratic member of the Philadelphia City Council from 2012 until 2022.

== Political career ==
Henon, an electrician by trade, has worked as a steward, sub-foreman, and foreman. John "Johnny Doc" Dougherty, the leader of the local chapter of the International Brotherhood of Electrical Workers (IBEW), eventually named him the chapter's new political director, a position from which Henon lobbied various levels of government on legislative issues pertaining to the electrical industry. Henon also managed election day operations for endorsed candidates, educated campaign volunteers, and coordinated major campaign events. He also served as Chairman of the local’s Political Action Committee, as board member of the Electrical Mechanical Association, and as a delegate to the IBEW International Convention.

In 2011, he was elected to Philadelphia City Council's Sixth District, succeeding the retiring incumbent Democrat Joan Krajewski.

== Criminal charges ==
In January 2019, a federal grand jury indicted Henon along with other members of the IBEW Local 98, including its business manager John Dougherty, for embezzlement and theft in a corruption probe by federal officials. Henon stated that he planned to contest the charges and not resign from office. On November 15, 2021, a jury convicted Henon on 10 of 18 federal charges. On January 20, 2022, Henon resigned from Philadelphia City Council. In March 2023, a judge sentenced Henon to 3.5 years in prison. He reported to prison at Federal Correctional Institution, Fort Dix the following month.

== See also ==
- List of members of Philadelphia City Council since 1952
