= Donna Reed Miller =

American politician (1946–2024)

Member of the Philadelphia City Council from the 8th District
- In office January 1, 1996 – January 2, 2012
- Preceded by: Alvin Stewart
- Succeeded by: Cindy Bass

Personal details
- Born: September 29, 1946
- Died: June 27, 2024 (aged 77)
- Party: Democratic
- Children: 2
- Education: Antioch University
- Profession: Politician

Donna Reed Miller (September 29, 1946 – June 27, 2024) was an American Democratic politician and Councilwoman representing the Eighth District on the City Council of Philadelphia, Pennsylvania, USA. She served from 1996 to 2012. Miller was born on September 29, 1946, and died on June 27, 2024, at the age of 77.

== Political career ==
During the early part of her political career, Miller was mentored by Pennsylvania State House of Representatives member David P. Richardson Jr., a graduate of Germantown High School and former recreation specialist with The Philadelphia Department of Parks and Recreation who rose to political prominence through positions as executive director of the Greater Germantown Youth Corporation and on various Democratic Party committees.

Serving on the Philadelphia City Council from 1996 to 2012, Miller represented the council's Eighth District, which is composed of neighborhoods from Chestnut Hill and Mt. Airy through Germantown to Nicetown-Tioga. In 2007, she played a highly visible role in the council's threat to withhold funding for a multimillion dollar expansion of Philadelphia's Convention Center if minority hiring was not improved. And in 2007 and 2009, she collaborated with fellow council member Darrell L. Clarke to shepherd several gun safety measures through passage by the council and then through their respective court challenges in order to ensure that gun owners whose guns were lost or stolen would be required to report those missing weapons, that those with domestic violence restraining orders placed against them would be prohibited from owning weapons, and that anyone who had been deemed a danger to the community would also be prohibited from owning guns.

Miller's tenure in this position was also marked by controversy, however, when her chief of staff, Steven Vaughn, was charged with criminal activity. Convicted in 2005, Vaughn had become involved in an illegal tax scheme to help Shamsud-din Ali, an imam and leader of a West Philadelphia mosque, collect $60,000 in city taxes from a Chestnut Hill company even though Ali had not worked for that company. That plan then became a fixture of news reports for a period of time as media coverage of the bugging of Mayor John F. Street's office ramped up during an FBI investigation into alleged corruption at Philadelphia's City Hall. Despite this controversy, she won the 2007 Democratic primary with 31.6% of the vote and was subsequently re-elected to another term on the city council.

More controversy arose again soon after, however, when another of Miller's former staff members, Theresa Pinkett, pleaded guilty to extortion in 2008. Pinkett, who worked for Miller's office from February 1996 until January 2006, was accused of having accepted $5,000 and a cell phone, sometime between 2001 and 2003, in exchange for helping one or more people resolve "real estate issues" related to properties owned by that individual(s) in the city, and was also accused of similar activity during the position she had held with a different city office after leaving her job with Miller's office.

After serving five terms on the city council, Miller announced in January 2011 that she would not seek reelection, explaining that it was "time to give another person the opportunity to represent this wonderful district," and adding: "I never believed this position to be a lifetime job, and though I know I have the political and physical ability to serve, it is the right time for me to move into another type of public service." Media reports also noted that the 64-year-old Miller "had neither the financial support nor the enthusiasm to seek a fifth term" and was having "diabetes-related problems" prior to her retirement.

=== Ward leader ===
Following her retirement from the Philadelphia City Council, Miller continued to serve as the ward leader of the 59th Ward Democratic Executive Committee until 2022.

== See also ==
- List of members of Philadelphia City Council since 1952
