= Richard T. Mariano =

American politician

Member of the Philadelphia City Council from the 7th District
- In office 1996–2006
- Preceded by: Daniel P. McElhatton
- Succeeded by: Daniel J. Savage

Richard T. 'Rick' Mariano is a Democratic politician and former member of the City Council of Philadelphia, Pennsylvania who served time in jail for accepting bribes.

== Political career ==
Mariano began his political career working for Philadelphia city council member Daniel P. McElhatton. He ran against his former boss in 1995 and won, making him the representative for Philadelphia's seventh council district. In 2005 he was arrested on charges that he exchanged political favors to pay off his credit card bills. He was convicted and sentenced to six and a half years in prison, eventually being released in 2010 after serving just over four years of his sentence.
