= Bill Green IV =

American politician (born 1965)

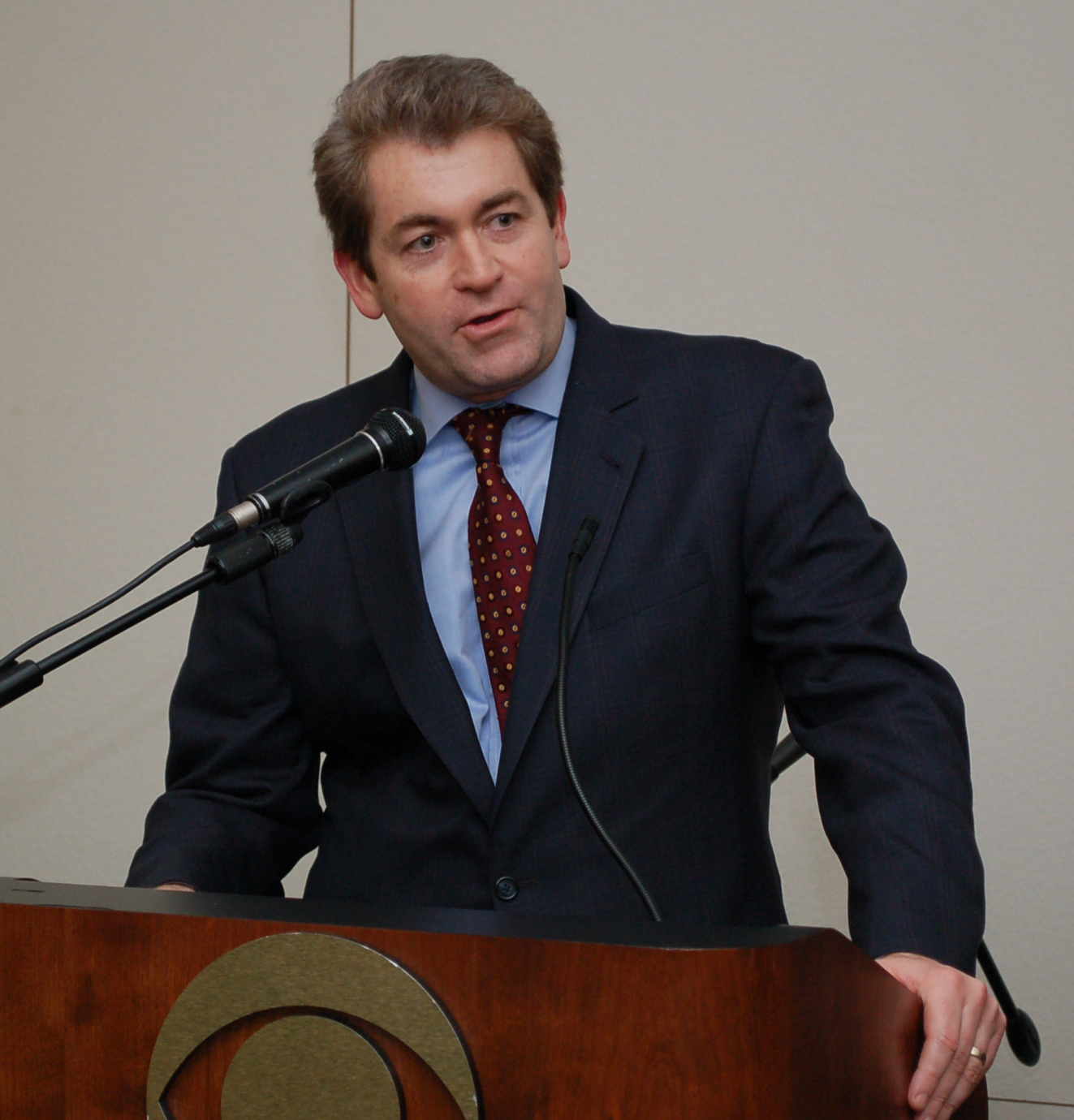
- Green in 2010

Member of the Philadelphia City Council from the at-large district
- In office January 7, 2008 – February 2014
- Preceded by: Juan Ramos
- Succeeded by: Ed Neilson

Personal details
- Born: William Joseph Green IV; March 29, 1965 (age 61) Philadelphia, Pennsylvania
- Party: Democratic
- Spouse: Margaret Green
- Children: 2
- Parent: William J. Green III (father)
- Relatives: William J. Green Jr. (grandfather)
- Education: Auburn University (B.A.); University of Pennsylvania Law School (J.D.)

William Joseph Green IV (born March 29, 1965) is the former chair of the School Reform Commission of the School District of Philadelphia and a former Democratic Councilman-at-Large on the City Council of Philadelphia, Pennsylvania. While in office, he prioritized accountability and fiscal discipline, constituent service, and quality of life for city residents.

== Early life and education ==
Green grew up a block from Frankford High School, and graduated from Penn Charter and attended Saint Joseph's University before graduating from Auburn University. He obtained his law degree from the University of Pennsylvania School of Law.

== Political background ==
Green's father, William J. Green III, was a member of the U.S. House, Chairman of Philadelphia's Democratic City Committee, and Mayor of Philadelphia, and his grandfather, William J. Green, Jr., was a Congressman and Chairman of Philadelphia's Democratic City Committee.

In 1991, Green wrote policy papers for Ed Rendell's successful campaign for Mayor. He worked on numerous Democratic campaigns attempting to elect candidates to Congress, attorney general posts, state legislative seats, and local offices.

Prior to first seeking office in 2007, Green reportedly traded options and futures in New York, London, and Amsterdam. After obtaining his law degree, he said he founded several businesses, represented top Fortune 500 companies and start-ups as a corporate lawyer, and served as president of VistaScape Security Systems.

He left his position as a City Council member in February 2014 and was sworn in as the chair of the School Reform Commission. He was nominated by Governor Tom Corbett.

He was fired from his role as Chair of the SRC by Governor Wolf for approving a new Charter School against the expressed wishes of the Governor.
