= Marian B. Tasco =

American politician

Marian Tasco
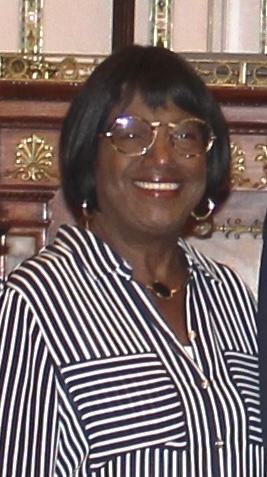

Member of the Philadelphia City Council from the 9th District
- In office January 4, 1988 – January 4, 2016
- Preceded by: John White
- Succeeded by: Cherelle Parker

Personal details
- Born: November 26, 1937 (age 88) Greensboro, North Carolina, US
- Party: Democratic
- Education: Temple University

Marian Benton Tasco (born November 26, 1937) is an American politician who served on the Philadelphia City Council. A member of the Democratic Party, Tasco represented Philadelphia's ninth district for twenty-eight years.

== Early life and education ==
Marian Benton Tasco was born on November 26, 1937. A native of Greensboro, North Carolina, Tasco graduated from James B. Dudley High School in 1956. She studied at Bennett College under a scholarship, but was forced to drop out after a few years as she could not pay tuition. She moved to live with her mother in Pennsylvania, married, and had a son, and in 1959 became a clerk for the Philadelphia Police Department. While later working for the Philadelphia Museum of Art, she took night classes at Temple University and obtained a degree in business education in 1965. In 1969, Tasco moved from West Philadelphia to the Mount Airy neighborhood in Northwest Philadelphia.

== Political career ==
Tasco became active in city politics in the 1970s. From 1970 to 1976, she worked for the Philadelphia Urban Affairs Coalition and worked with political leaders including coalition director Charles W. Bowser and State Representative William H. Gray III. In 1975, she worked for Bowser's campaign for Philadelphia mayor. In 1983, she was elected to the Philadelphia City Commissioners, which administers the city's elections, as its first African-American commissioner. Around this time, she ran for the 50th Ward Democratic Committee. As a city commissioner, Tasco set policy and led voter registration and education programs in city schools. By the end of her term, she was convinced the office was obsolete and has publicly expressed these concerns through the rest of her career.

Four years later in 1987, Tasco was elected to her seat on the Philadelphia City Council, defeating two other challengers in the Democratic primary, after incumbent Democratic councilman John F. White Jr. resigned from the council earlier in the year. Upon election to the council, she assumed leadership of the 50th Ward Democratic Committee, a position she holds as of 2018. In the 1980s, Tasco additionally helped prepare women to run for office and worked as a consultant and trainer for the YWCA. In 1989, she established the Black Women's Leadership Council with Emma C. Chappell and fellow city councilmember Augusta Clark, among others.

As president of the National Black Caucus of Local Elected Officials (NBC-LEO), Tasco ran workshops on the issue of predatory lending prevalent in urban black communities in the 1990s. In 2001, she sponsored a bill that curbed the practice. The bill was described by The Philadelphia Inquirer as the first of its kind in the United States.

Tasco has led several efforts to cut smoking in Philadelphia. In early 2006, Tasco sponsored a bill that sought to ban smoking in all workplaces. The council voted to pass the bill in June 2006. In 2010 she sponsored a bill that increased fines on retailers who sell cigarettes to minors, amidst efforts under mayor Michael Nutter to reduce city smoking rates.

Tasco was enrolled in the city's controversial Deferred Retirement Option Plan (DROP) and faced public criticism for her enrollment in the program when she sought reelection for a seventh term in the council. Despite legal challenges to her candidacy in 2011, a judge ultimately ruled Tasco could run despite her enrollment in the program. Tasco made a one-day retirement at the end of 2011 to collect a lump sum pension payment from DROP and returned the following week to start her seventh term in the council.

Tasco is a co-founder of the Northwest Coalition, an alliance of African-American politicians from Northwest Philadelphia. Alongside other members of the coalition, she endorsed Jim Kenney prior to the 2015 Philadelphia mayoral election.

== Retirement ==
Tasco retired at the end of her term in January 2016. She served a total of twenty-eight years on the council, part of which as its majority leader. Cherelle Parker, who previously worked in the council under Tasco, was elected to fill Tasco's seat in November 2015. The Inquirer, honoring Tasco at her retirement gala, stated:

Mayors past, present, and future praised Tasco as a source of advice in unsure times and a force of political nature when she was sure what she wanted to accomplish.

In 2015, Tasco was honored by the Coalition of Labor Union Women. In 2017, Tasco and other members of the Northwest Coalition endorsed Larry Krasner's campaign to become District Attorney of Philadelphia. In 2018, as part of an annual symposium commemorating Black History Month, Senator Bob Casey Jr. recognized Tasco for "her dedication to public service and work to inspire future generations of leaders".

Tasco endorsed the 2020 presidential campaign of Joe Biden alongside other local and state leaders. Later that year, when Biden announced that Senator Kamala Harris would be his vice presidential running mate, Tasco told The Inquirer: "For us to have an African American woman be a candidate for vice president, that is just so exciting for me, having worked so long in the political arena."

A street in Northwest Philadelphia was named for Tasco in 2022.

== Personal life ==
Tasco married Thomas Earl Williams in 1982. Williams worked at the Philadelphia Housing Authority. He died in 1995. Upon sponsoring a 2010 anti-smoking bill, Tasco spoke about how heavy smoking led to his death.

Tasco is a member of the Delta Sigma Theta sorority.
