= Joan L. Krajewski =

Joan Krajewski
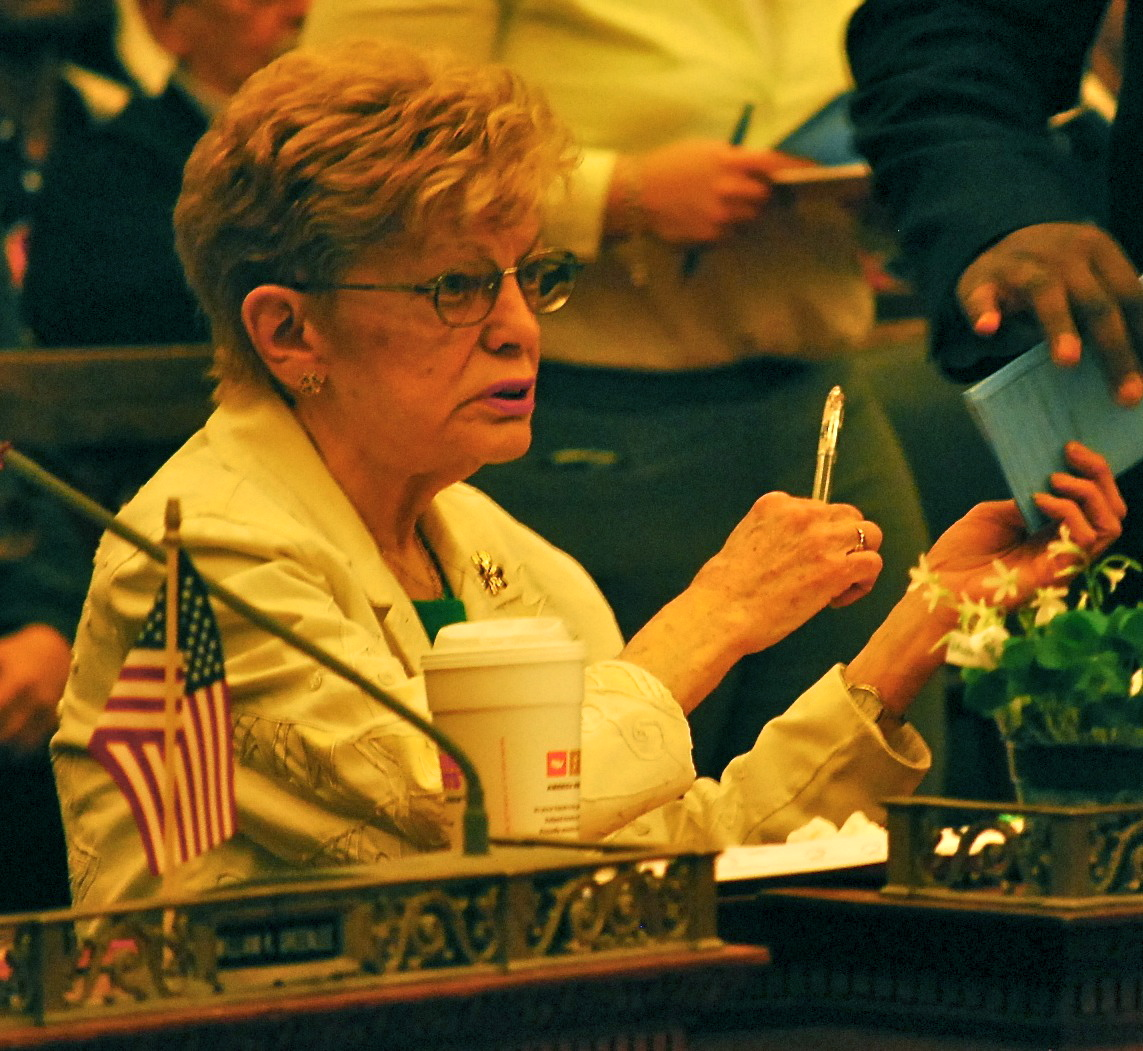
- Krajewski in 2011

Member of the Philadelphia City Council from the 6th District
- In office January 7, 1980 – January 2, 2012
- Preceded by: Joseph Zazyczny
- Succeeded by: Bobby Henon

Personal details
- Born: May 31, 1934 Port Richmond, Philadelphia
- Died: August 29, 2013 (aged 79)
- Party: Democratic
- Children: Three
- Profession: Politician, Union official

Joan L. Krajewski (May 31, 1934 – August 29, 2013) was a Democratic politician and former member of the Philadelphia City Council who represented the Sixth District of Philadelphia, Pennsylvania for thirty two years.

== Biography ==
Krajewski, who lived in Port Richmond and whose district included much of Lower Northeast Philadelphia, began her political career as a Republican committeeperson. After supporting Frank Rizzo, who was then a Democrat, in the 1971 mayoral election, she soon switched parties. One of a faction of conservative white Democrats who represented working-class Philadelphia neighborhoods and were sometimes described as "Rizzocrats," she was known for her loyalty to her supporters and her skill at political maneuvering and was often described as "tough" and "a fighter."

She succeeded Councilman Joseph Zazyczny in the seat after his resignation in 1979 and served on Council from 1980 to 2012.

Krajewski was, prior to her election, an active union official who served as the president of Local 1660-School Board Employees, District Council 33, and the American Federation of State, County and Municipal Employees’ Union. She was also an investigator for the City Department of Revenue and the Ward Leader of the 65th Ward Democratic Executive Committee, beginning with her election to the position in 1978.

She played a crucial role in 1999 ensuring that the owners of condemned houses in Wissinoming were fully compensated. She persuaded Mayor Rendell to revisit a sewer construction project from 1996-97 which homeowners believed caused structural issues in their homes, coordinated with state representatives securing state funds for the homeowners, and provided ongoing support to the affected residents until the situation was resolved.

In 2007, cartoonist Aaron Krolikowski, sketched a day in the life of the Councilwoman combined with an interview by the Inquirer's Jeff Shields.

== Illness and death ==
Krajewski died on August 29, 2013 of COPD.
