= Anna C. Verna =

American politician (1931–2021)

President of the Philadelphia City Council
- In office January 14, 1999 – December 15, 2011
- Preceded by: John Street
- Succeeded by: Darrell Clarke

Member of the Philadelphia City Council from the 2nd District
- In office January 6, 1975 – January 2, 2012
- Preceded by: William Cibotti
- Succeeded by: Kenyatta Johnson

Personal details
- Born: Anna Cibotti; April 15, 1931 Philadelphia, Pennsylvania
- Died: June 15, 2021 (aged 90)
- Party: Democratic

Anna Cibotti Verna (April 15, 1931 – June 15, 2021) was the President of the Philadelphia City Council on which she served from 1975 to 2012, as the representative of the Second District, which encompasses most of South Philadelphia as well as most of the western end of Center City. She was a Democrat.

== Career ==
Verna was the daughter of past council member William Cibotti and was elected to his seat following his death in 1975.

She drew criticism for her support of the Deferred Retirement Option Plan (DROP), which deferred compensation for city employees allowing municipal employees to forgo some pension payments in lieu of a lump-sum payment on the date of their retirement. Prior to the 2011 municipal election, several council members exploited a loophole in DROP, allowing elected officials to retire for a day at the end of their term, and then resume work in their next term. Following public outcry, several of the council members who enrolled in DROP, including Verna, declined to run for re-election. Others, such as Councilman Frank Rizzo, Jr., were defeated for renomination.

=== Ward leader ===
Verna was the Ward Leader of the 36th Ward Democratic Executive Committee.

== See also ==
- History of the Italian Americans in Philadelphia
