= Frank DiCicco =

Member of the Philadelphia City Council from the 1st District
- In office January 1, 1996 – January 2, 2012
- Preceded by: Joe Vignola
- Succeeded by: Mark Squilla

Personal details
- Born: May 21, 1946 (age 79) Philadelphia, Pennsylvania, U.S.
- Party: Democratic
- Spouse: Maria DiCicco (m. 2006)

Frank DiCicco (born May 21, 1946) is a Democratic politician and former Councilman who represented the First District on the City Council of Philadelphia, Pennsylvania. He served for 16 years (4 terms), and decided not to run for a fifth term in 2011. A major accomplishment during his time in office was the 10-year Tax Abatement Plan that sparked development in Center City and on the Philadelphia waterfront. He then launched a consulting firm, Frank DiCicco Associates.

Before running for office he served as an administrator in the Philadelphia Traffic Court system for 16 years. In 2017 DiCicco was appointed by Mayor Jim Kenney as chairman of Philadelphia's Zoning Board of Adjustment, serving until November 2021.

DiCicco lives in the Passyunk Square neighborhood.

== See also ==
- List of members of Philadelphia City Council since 1952
