= William K. Greenlee =

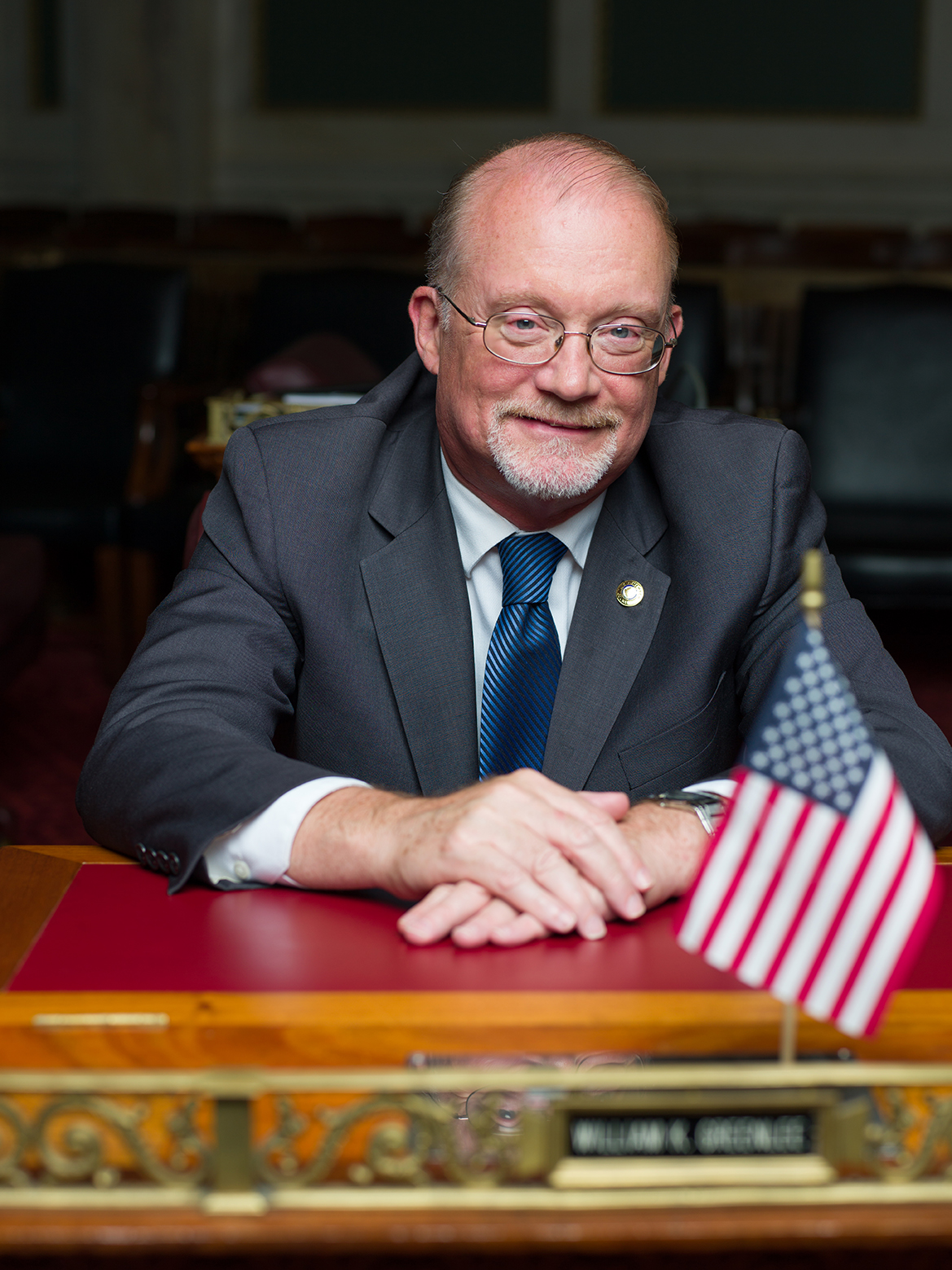
- Councilman-At-Large Bill Greenlee

Member of the Philadelphia City Council from the at-large district
- In office November 27, 2006 – January 6, 2020
- Preceded by: David Cohen
- Succeeded by: Isaiah Thomas

Personal details
- Political party: Democratic
- Spouse: Leslie Greenlee

William K. Greenlee is a former Democratic Councilman-at-Large on the City Council of Philadelphia. He served from 2006 to 2020.

Greenlee was elected to Council in a special election in November 2006 and was re-elected to serve a full term in 2007 and again in 2011. He is chairperson of the Rules and Law and Government Committees and is also the vice-chair of the Public Property and Transportation Committees. The Councilman also serves on the Streets and Services, Licenses and Inspections, Public Health and Human Services, and Housing Neighborhood Development and the Homeless committees. The Councilman was elected by his colleagues to serve as Majority Deputy Whip in 2012.

Greenlee is the Ward Leader of the 15th Ward Democratic Executive Committee.

== Notable Laws ==
Greenlee was a co-sponsor of the bill that required stores in Philadelphia to accept legal tender

In 2012, Greenlee championed a bill taking the power to approve bike lanes away from the Mayor's office, and giving it to City Council. This act made it considerably more difficult to install safe bicycle infrastructure in Philadelphia.
