= W. Wilson Goode Jr. =

American politician

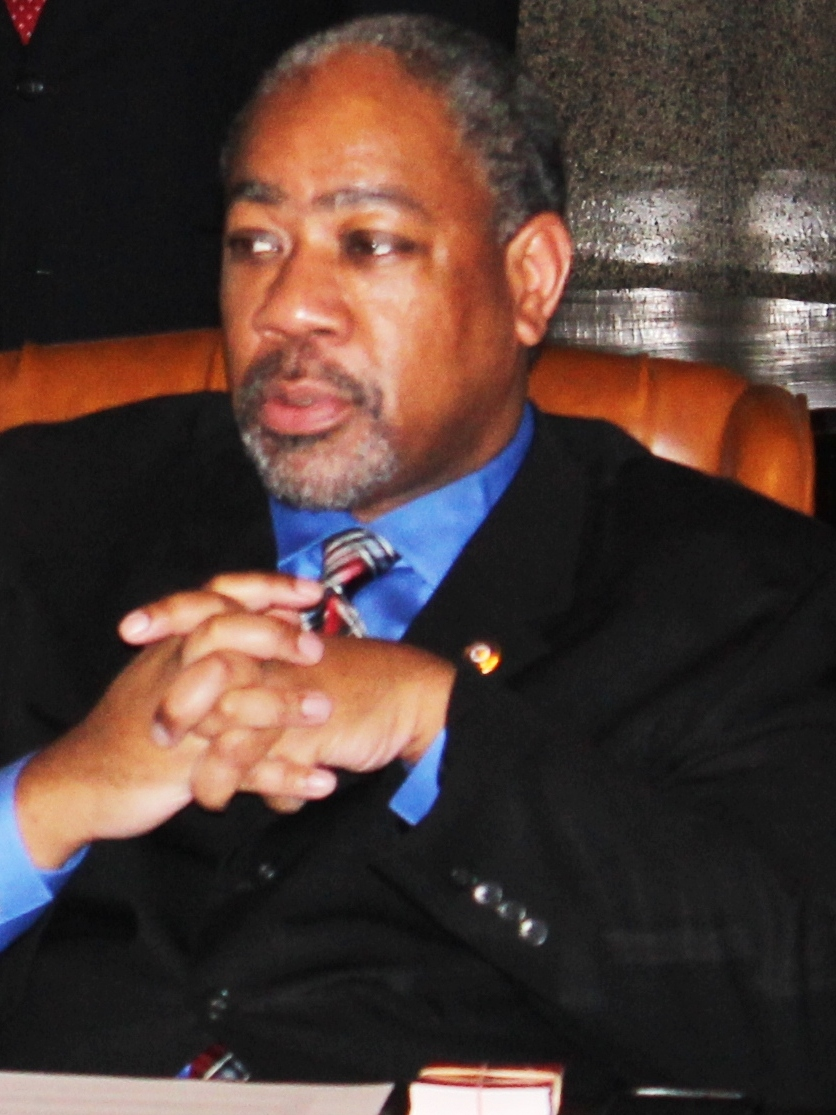

Member of the Philadelphia City Council from the at-large district
- In office January 3, 2000 – January 4, 2016

Personal details
- Born: Woodrow Wilson Goode Jr; August 9, 1965 (age 61) Philadelphia, Pennsylvania
- Party: Democratic
- Education: University of Pennsylvania

Woodrow Wilson Goode Jr. (born August 9, 1965) is an American politician. He served on the Philadelphia City Council from 2000 to 2016.

== Biography ==
Goode is the son of former Philadelphia Mayor Wilson Goode. He was born on August 9, 1965, and graduated from Central High School and the University of Pennsylvania. He also later did graduate studies at Harvard Kennedy School.

He was elected City Councilman At-Large in 1999 and won re-election three times.

Goode served as Chairman of the Committee on Appropriations as well as the Committee on Commerce and Economic Development. He introduced over 145 city ordinances including: a revenue share increase for public education; a civil service preference for local residents; a living wage and benefits standard for City-supported employees; annual disparity analyses; diversity goals for city contracting; fair lending plans and community reinvestment goals from city depository banks; contractor debarment processes for economic discrimination; elimination of the business gross receipts tax; business tax credits for job creation and investment in community economic development; as well as municipal election reform.

Goode was a Founding Board Member of Local Progress, the national municipal policy network created in 2012. Goode was also the recipient of a National Achievement Award from the National Community Reinvestment Coalition in 2006. He also received the 2013 Community Development Champion Award from the Philadelphia Association of Community Development Corporations and 2015 PA Working Families Legislator of the Year Award.

W. Wilson Goode Jr. is also a duly initiated member of Alpha Phi Alpha fraternity, Sigma Pi Phi fraternity, and the Most Worshipful Prince Hall Grand Lodge of Free and Accepted Masons.
