= Blondell Reynolds Brown =

American politician (born 1952)

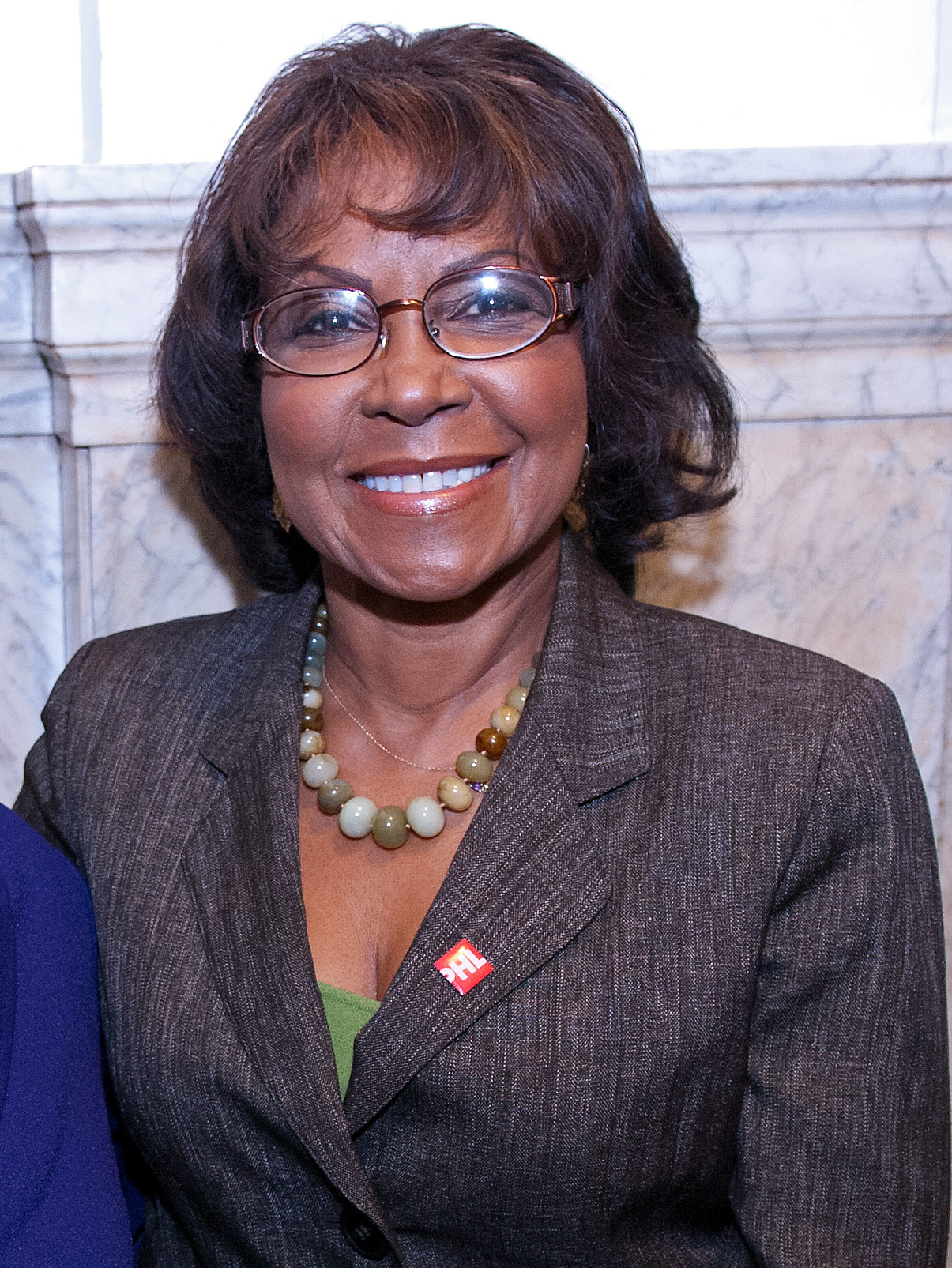

Member of the Philadelphia City Council from the at-large district
- In office January 3, 2000 – January 6, 2020
- Preceded by: Augusta Clark
- Succeeded by: Katherine Gilmore Richardson

Personal details
- Born: October 16, 1952 (age 74) Sumter, South Carolina
- Party: Democratic
- Education: Penn State University

Blondell Reynolds Brown (born October 16, 1952) is an American politician and member of the Democratic Party. She served as a member of the Philadelphia City Council.

Reynolds Brown was the only woman to serve At-Large in City Council from 1999 to 2015.

On January 2, 2012, Reynolds Brown was elected the council's Majority Whip, and was the only woman then serving in City Council Leadership.

== Biography ==
Reynolds Brown was born on October 16, 1952, in Sumter, South Carolina. Her parents are Sadie, a schoolteacher, and the late Whittimore Reynolds, who worked in construction. She is the oldest of seven children.

After graduating from the Philadelphia High School for Girls in 1970, Reynolds Brown earned a bachelor's degree in Elementary Education in 1974 and a Master of Science in education with a focus on counseling and guidance in 1975, both from Penn State University. That year she began teaching elementary school in the School District of Philadelphia.

In 1976, Reynolds Brown began a career as a professional dancer, ultimately earning a place as a professional company member of the Philadelphia Dance Company, also known as Philadanco. Following her company membership, she would continue her affiliation with Philadanco, becoming a dance instructor and later a board member for 20 years.

From 2002 to 2005 Reynolds Brown served as a national Robert Wood Johnson Foundation fellow in the area of Urban Health Initiatives providing an intensive learning experience in planning and implementing strategic and innovative policy system changes for children, youth and families. She is also a graduate of the University of Pennsylvania's Community Leadership Program and the Philadelphia Urban League Leadership Institute.

She currently resides with her family in Philadelphia's Wynnefield section.

== Early political career ==
From 1982 to 1986, Reynolds Brown served as a committee person for the Third Division of Philadelphia's 24th Ward, beginning her career in politics. In 1991, she was hired as legislative director for then Pennsylvania State Senator and former Congressman Chaka Fattah. She went on to serve as Community Affairs Director for State Senator Vincent Hughes.

Reynolds Brown was a delegate to the Democratic National Convention in 1984, 1988, 1996, 2000 and 2008.

== Ethics Board Settlement ==
On September 21, 2011, the City of Philadelphia Ethics Board entered into an agreement with the campaign Friends of Blondell Reynolds Brown, which was signed and agreed to by City Councilwoman Blondell Reynolds Brown. Some contributions were not reported in a timely way on finance disclosure forms and numerous donations were over legal limits. In January 2013, Brown was again fined by the ethics board for campaign finance violations dating back to 2010, including her use of $4,500 of campaign funds for personal reasons. Brown's campaign manager was later accused of using $100,000 of political donations for personal uses and eventually found guilty of wire fraud.

== Campaigns ==
Philadelphia City Council is composed of 10 District Councilmembers and 7 members At-Large. At-Large members are elected citywide.

Per the Philadelphia Home Rule Charter, a candidate for City Council At-Large must place 5th or higher in their party primary held in May. Those candidates advance to the November general election where they must place 7th or higher to win a seat.

Year	Democratic Primary Ranking	Number of Primary Candidates	General Election Ranking (Out of 10)
1995	6th	12	N/A
1999	3rd	52	5th
2003	1st	10	3rd
2007	5th	19	4th
2011	1st	14	3rd

== Philadelphia City Council ==
=== Legislation ===
Reynolds Brown's core issues were women, children, education, arts and culture, and small business development. She emerged as a leader on energy conservation, sustainability and environmental issues. Legislative accomplishments are as follows:

Commission for Women: Commission for Women, which has 27 volunteer members, provides the foundation for change to create equitable opportunities for women in Philadelphia and enhance the quality of life of women, their families, and their communities.

Women on Boards: Advancing female entrepreneurship opportunities and leveling the playing field on business and governmental contracts.

Fund for Children: As a freshman Councilmember, along with Mayor John F. Street, Brown brokered a deal that established the Fund for Children during the new sports stadium negotiations in 2000. Consequently, the Philadelphia Phillies and Philadelphia Eagles will donate $1 million per team per year for 30 years, yielding more than $60 million to help children in Philadelphia.

Menu Labeling: Authorized legislation requiring chain restaurants with 15 or more locations nationwide to label menus with nutritional information, the most comprehensive menu labeling bill in the country. The bill requires the listing of fat, sodium and sugar in addition to calories

$30 Million in Additional School Funding: Authorized further borrowing of funds by the Philadelphia Authority for Industrial Development.

Department of Parks and Recreation Merger: Worked with Council President Darrell Clarke to overhaul Philadelphia's Parks and Recreation system, merging Fairmount Park with the Department of Recreation creating increased efficiency and savings.

Mayor's Office of Sustainability: Established and defined the responsibilities of the Office of Sustainability.

Littering Bill: Increased the availability of trash and recycling bins by placing them within 10 feet of any business selling food. Also provided tenants of buildings with 10 or more units with a place to store trash and recyclables.

Green Roof Tax Credit: Grants a 50 percent tax credit to homeowners whose roofs support living vegetation and include synthetic, waterproof membranes, draining layers, soil layers, and lightweight medium plants.

Energy Benchmarking: Establishes a system of benchmarking and reporting of energy and water usage data for residential and non-residential buildings with 50,000 square feet or more.

ATVs: Restricts ATV use on public sidewalks or private properties unless authorized by law, and gives the Philadelphia Police Department authority to confiscate vehicles or impose a fine on riders.

Hospitality Promotion: Increased funding for the Greater Philadelphia Tourism Marketing Corporation and the Philadelphia Convention and Visitors Bureau, organizations which promote the tourism industry.

Hate Crime Bill: Added a new chapter to the Philadelphia Code that provides additional penalties for criminal conduct motivated by hatred regarding sexual orientation, gender identity, and disabilities.

Daycare Fee Waiver: Removed permit fees for group daycare providers and filling fees from the Zoning Board of Adjustment.

Citywide Bike Sharing Program: Authorized Bicycle Transit Systems to plan and operate a bicycle sharing program in the City and B-cycle to provide bicycles, stations and technology platforms for the system.

"Philly First" Bill: Changed how the City awards contracts of $1million or less by increasing the bidding preference for City owned businesses from 5 percent to 10 percent.

=== Committee assignments ===
Brown was a member of the following City Council committees:

- Environment (chair)
- Education (Vice-chair)
- Commerce and Economic Development
- Global Opportunities and The Economy
- Parks, Recreation, and Cultural Affairs
- Ethics
- Finance
- Fiscal Stability & Intergovernmental Cooperation
- Public Health & Human Services
- Legislative Oversight
- Rules
- Transportation and Public Utilities
- Whole

== Community involvement ==
Since 1999, Reynolds Brown has become an honorary mentor to thousands of women and girls through her signature program, The Celebration of Moxie Women, on the occasion of Women's History Month in March. Through this program, Reynolds Brown has honored hundreds of successful business and professional women, working mothers, and Philadelphia's "Next Generation of Female Leaders: Rising Stars".

In 2010, Reynolds Brown filmed an It Gets Better video as part of a national campaign to combat bullying-related suicide by LGBT youth.

Reynolds Brown serves on the board of directors of the following community organizations:"

- Philadelphia Convention and Visitor's Bureau
- The Marian Anderson Award
- The African American Museum of Philadelphia
- Philadelphia Young Playwrights
- City Year Greater Philadelphia
- Please Touch Museum
- The Greater Philadelphia Cultural Alliance
- Girl Scouts of Eastern Pennsylvania
- Wynnefield Residents Association

She has also held board affiliations with:

- Delta Sigma Theta sorority, Phildadelphia Chapter
- National League of Cities – Children, Youth, & Families Division
- Pinn Memorial Baptist Church in West Philadelphia
- National Coalition of 100 Black Women, Pennsylvania Chapter

== Awards ==
Through 2012, Reynolds Brown has been honored with the following awards:

- National Coalition of 100 Black Women Woman of the Year Award
- Philadelphia Young Playwrights Advocate Award
- Girl Scouts of Eastern Pennsylvania Take the Lead Award
- Girls Inc. Strong, Smart & Bold Award
- Women's Way Powerful Voice: Leadership Award
- School District of Philadelphia's Obermayer Award: Outstanding Alumni
- Mazzoni Center Justice in Action Award
- United Way of Southeastern Pennsylvania, Women's Initiative Award
