= Darrell L. Clarke =

American politician

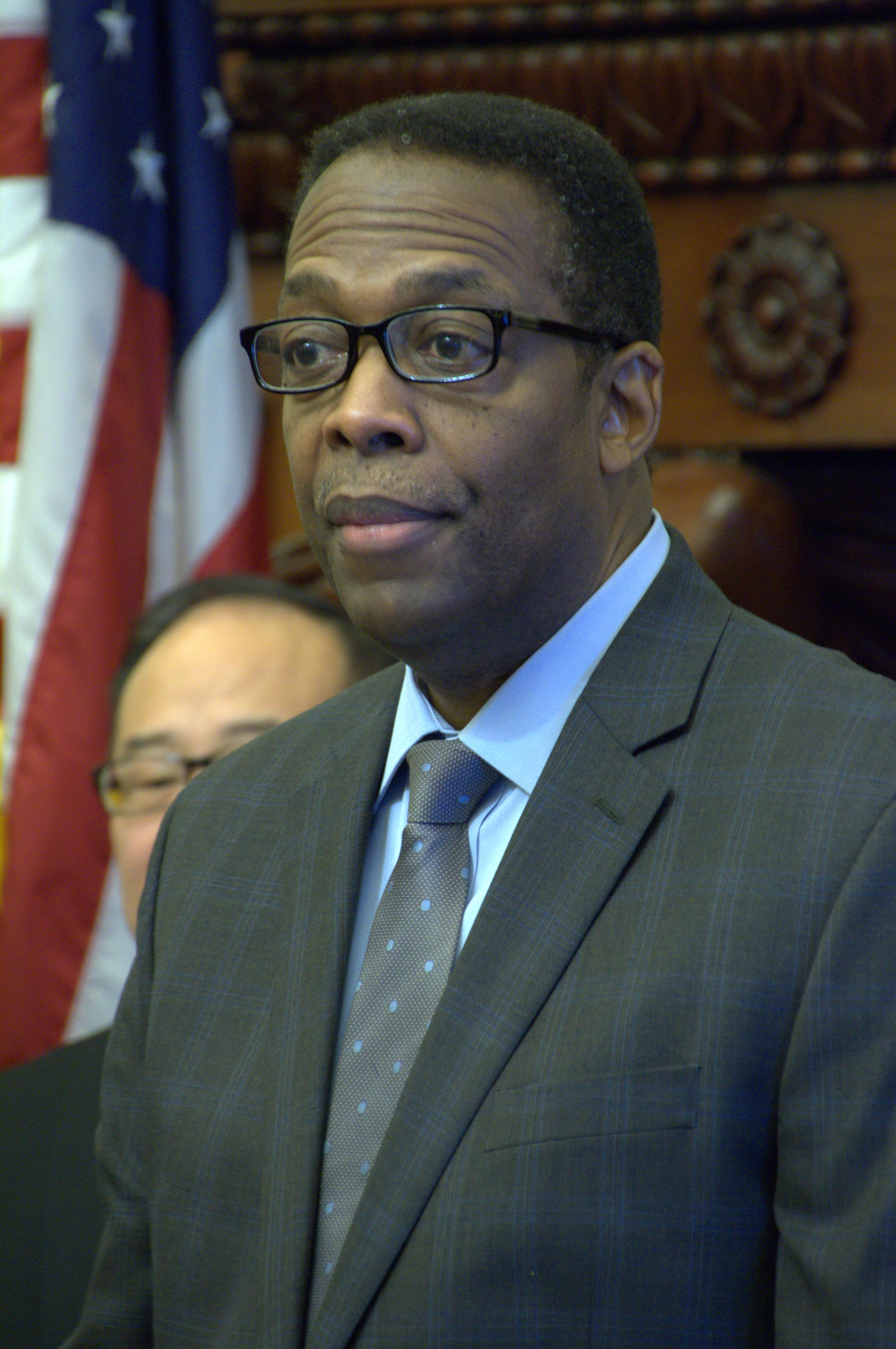
- Clarke in 2016

Chair of the Pennsylvania Liquor Control Board
- Incumbent
- Assumed office November 22, 2024
- Preceded by: Tim Holden

Member of the Pennsylvania Liquor Control Board
- Incumbent
- Assumed office February 8, 2024
- Preceded by: Mary Isenhour

President of the Philadelphia City Council
- In office January 2, 2012 – January 1, 2024
- Preceded by: Anna Verna
- Succeeded by: Kenyatta Johnson

Member of the Philadelphia City Council from the 5th district
- In office May 18, 1999 – January 1, 2024
- Preceded by: John Street
- Succeeded by: Jeffery Young Jr.

Personal details
- Born: September 17, 1952 (age 73) Philadelphia, Pennsylvania, U.S.
- Party: Democratic

Darrell L. Clarke (born September 17, 1952) is an American politician serving as the chairman of the Pennsylvania Liquor Control Board since 2024. A member of the Democratic Party, he served on the Philadelphia City Council from 1999 to 2024.

== Early life and education ==
A native of North Philadelphia, Clarke grew up in the Strawberry Mansion neighborhood. He graduated from Edison High School. He later attended the Community College of Philadelphia but did not graduate. He now resides in the Fishtown neighborhood.

== Political career ==
He was elected as a committeeman himself and became an aide (and later chief of staff) to John Street, who represented the Fifth District for nearly three decades and eventually became Council President.

=== Election to city council ===
In December 1998, Street resigned as a member of the City Council to run for mayor and endorsed Clarke for his seat in the 1999 special election held. Clarke won by only 140 votes over Julie Welker and Dorothy Carn. Welker filed a lawsuit alleging election fraud. The case was decided in Clarke's favor.

=== City council tenure ===
Clarke is a former Majority Whip and is the Chair of the Fiscal Stability and Public Property Committees and Vice Chairman of the Appropriations Committee. He was elected to the position of Council President after the office was vacated by the retiring Anna Verna.

One of Clarke's legislative actions was his introduction of the bill to end the City-subsidized lease on the 80-year-old headquarters building of the Cradle of Liberty Council of the Boy Scouts of America over their ban on gay scouts. After a protracted legal battle, the bill was overturned in Federal court and the City of Philadelphia was ordered to pay nearly a million dollars in legal fees to the Boy Scouts.

In 2015, City Council President Darrell Clarke approved 1,330 private properties for the Philadelphia Housing Authority (PHA) to seize through eminent domain. In 2019, the Inspector General stated that a Philadelphia developer backed by Council President Darrell Clarke 'took advantage' of flawed city processes for 'private gain.’

During his time on the City Council, Clarke blocked the construction of a 77-unit senior affordable housing development slated for 33rd and York Streets. Over the course of years, Clarke delayed the development and forced the developer to reduce the number of units to 57, scrap proposed duplexes for single-family townhomes, and force the developer to move the proposed housing to Diamond Street.

=== PA Liquor Control Board (PLCB) ===
Clarke was nominated to PLCB by Pennsylvania Governor Josh Shapiro on Sep 1, 2023, and was confirmed by PA Senate on Feb 8, 2024. On Nov 22, 2024, Clarke was named as PLCB chairman by Gov Josh Shapiro, following the retirement of Tim Holden.

== Personal life ==
His father, Jerry, was involved in politics as a party committeeman. His mother, Ruth, was employed by the Veterans Administration.

Clarke has one daughter, Dr. Nicole Bright, and a grandson.

== See also ==
- List of members of Philadelphia City Council since 1952
