= 2027 Philadelphia City Council election =

2027 local election in Philadelphia

- November 2, 2027

17 Seats on the Philadelphia City Council 9 seats needed for a majority
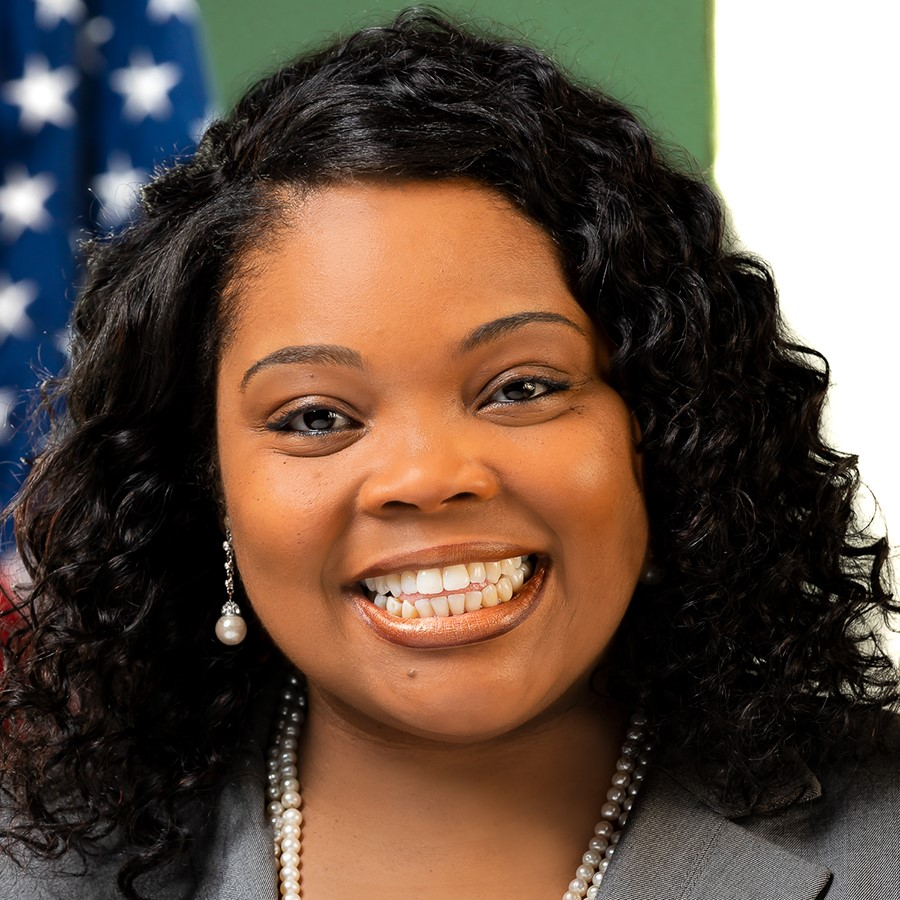

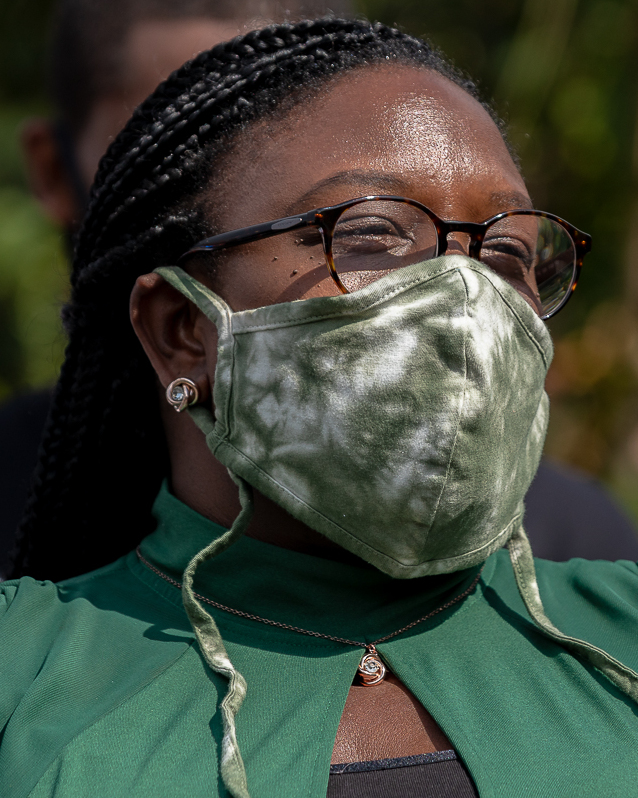

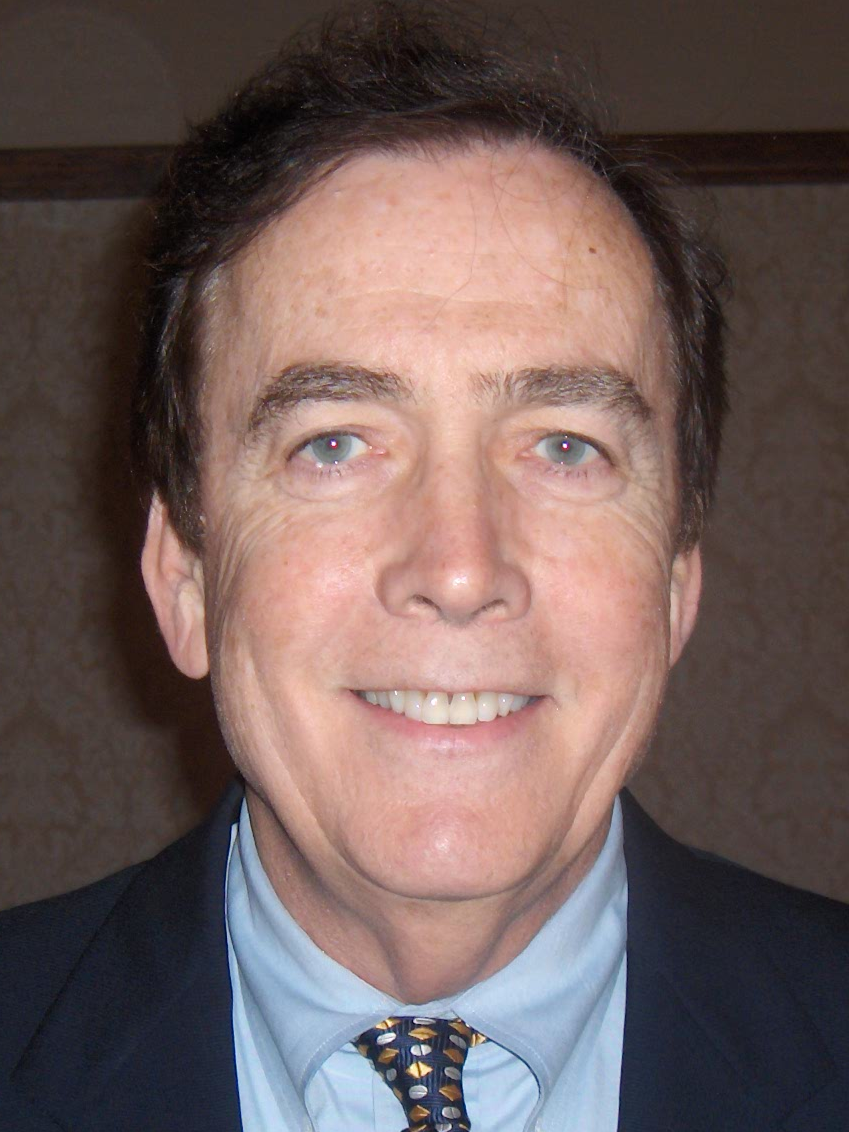
| Leader | Katherine Gilmore Richardson | Kendra Brooks | Brian O'Neill |
| Party | Democratic | Working Families | Republican |
| Leader's seat | At-large | At-large | District 10 |
| Last election | 14 | 2 | 1 |
| Seats needed | Steady | ▲7 | ▲8 |
Incumbent Council President
Kenyatta Johnson
Democratic

The 2027 Philadelphia City Council election will be held November 2, 2027, with all seats on the Philadelphia City Council up for election. The Democratic Party enters the election with a super-majority on the council, with the Working Families Party and Republican Party in the minority. The election will take place on the same day as the 2027 Philadelphia mayoral election and other local elections in the Commonwealth.

== Background ==
In 2023's council election, nine of the ten district seats re-elected their incumbent councilmembers, with Jeffrey (Jay) Young winning the 5th district, the only open district election. Five council spots had previously been filled during the 2022–23 Philadelphia City Council special elections, with Bobby Henon resigning due to being convicted on corruption charges, and the other four councilmembers resigns to run for Mayor of Philadelphia, as required by Philadelphia law. One of those councilmembers, Cherelle Parker, would go on to win the mayoral election.

All incumbent councilmembers have indicated they intend to pursue reelection. Should they all follow through, it would be the first time in 75 years.

Philly for Growth, a super PAC which is funded by Philadelphia's real estate developers, plans to spend $1.5 million to support centrist incumbent councilmembers, including Mark Squilla, Cindy Bass, and Quetcy Lozada. They will back a challenger to incumbent councilmember Jeffrey Young.

== 1st District ==
=== Democratic primary ===
==== Declared ====
- Will Gross, 2nd Ward leader, coffee shop owner, and candidate for HD-182 in 2022.
- Mark Squilla, incumbent councilor and majority whip

==== Potential ====
- Rue Landau, incumbent councilor from the at-large district (2024–present)

==== Endorsements ====
Will Gross

Organizations

- Philadelphia Democratic Socialists of America

== 2nd District ==
=== Democratic primary ===
==== Declared ====
- Kenyatta Johnson, incumbent councilor and council president

== 3rd District ==
=== Democratic primary ===
==== Publicly expressed interest ====
- Jamie Gauthier, incumbent councilor

== 4th District ==
=== Democratic primary ===
==== Publicly expressed interest ====
- Curtis J. Jones Jr., incumbent councilor
- Leigh Owens, former SEIU staffer

==== Potential ====
- Morgan Cephas, state representative from the 192nd district (2017–present)
- Ryan Spak, housing developer
- Celeste Trusty, former secretary of the Pennsylvania Board of Pardons and criminal justice reform advocate

== 5th District ==
Jeffery (Jay) Young Jr. won the 5th district's Democratic primary uncontested in 2023, after all other candidates were disqualified due to issues with their paperwork or nominating petitions, and later won the general election. Young has been criticized during his tenure over his handling of housing development and the renovation of the North Philadelphia Free Library branch.

=== Democratic primary ===
==== Declared ====
- Jeffery (Jay) Young Jr., incumbent councilor
- Jalon Alexander, lawyer
- Kellan White, political operative and former deputy City Controller
- Dustin Dove, lawyer and president of the Fairmount Civic Association

==== Publicly expressed interest ====
- Max Tuttleman, philanthropist and candidate for an at-large council seat in 2023
- Curtis Wilkerson, chief of staff to councilmember Darrell L. Clarke

== 6th District ==
=== Democratic primary ===
==== Publicly expressed interest ====
- Michael Driscoll, incumbent councilor

== 7th District ==
=== Democratic primary ===
==== Publicly expressed interest ====
- Quetcy Lozada, incumbent councilor
- Andres Celin, social worker and candidate for the 7th District in 2023

== 8th District ==
=== Democratic primary ===
==== Declared ====
- Jeff Jones, community leader and social justice advocate
- Cindy Bass, incumbent councilor and deputy majority whip

==== Expected to declare ====
- Seth Anderson-Oberman, executive director of Reclaim Philadelphia and candidate for the 8th District in 2023

== 9th District ==
=== Democratic primary ===
==== Publicly expressed interest ====
- Anthony Phillips, incumbent councilor

== 10th District ==
=== Republican primary ===
==== Declared ====
- Brian J. O'Neill, incumbent councilor

== At-Large Seats ==
Philadelphia City Council has seven at-large seats, two of which must be represented by a minority party. In 2023, five of the at-large seats were won by members of the Democratic Party, while the two minority party seats were won by Kendra Brooks and Nicolas O'Rourke of the Working Families Party.

Each party may nominate five candidates for the general election. Voters can select up to five candidates in both the primary and general.

=== Democratic primary ===
==== Declared ====
- Billy McCann, former teacher
- Isaiah T. Martin, community development nonprofit leader
- Isaiah Thomas, incumbent councilor and majority whip
- Jude Husein, community activist and former staffer for Art Haywood
- Shawn Moss, housing activist and organizer

==== Publicly expressed interest ====
- Katherine Gilmore Richardson, incumbent councilor and majority leader
- Jane Golden, executive director of Mural Arts Philadelphia
- Jim Harrity, incumbent councilor
- Nina Ahmad, incumbent councilor
- Rue Landau, incumbent councilor
- David Alexander Jenkins, cultural strategist

==== Endorsements ====
Shawn Moss

Organizations

- Philadelphia Democratic Socialists of America

=== Working Families primary ===
==== Publicly expressed interest ====
- Kendra Brooks, incumbent councilor and minority leader
- Nicolas O'Rourke, incumbent councilor and minority whip

=== Party primary not specified ===
==== Declared ====
- Vik Patel, attorney at Community Legal Services

==== Endorsements ====
Vik Patel

Organizations

- Philadelphia Democratic Socialists of America
