= 2025 Philadelphia District Attorney election =

2025 Philadelphia district attorney election
- November 4, 2025
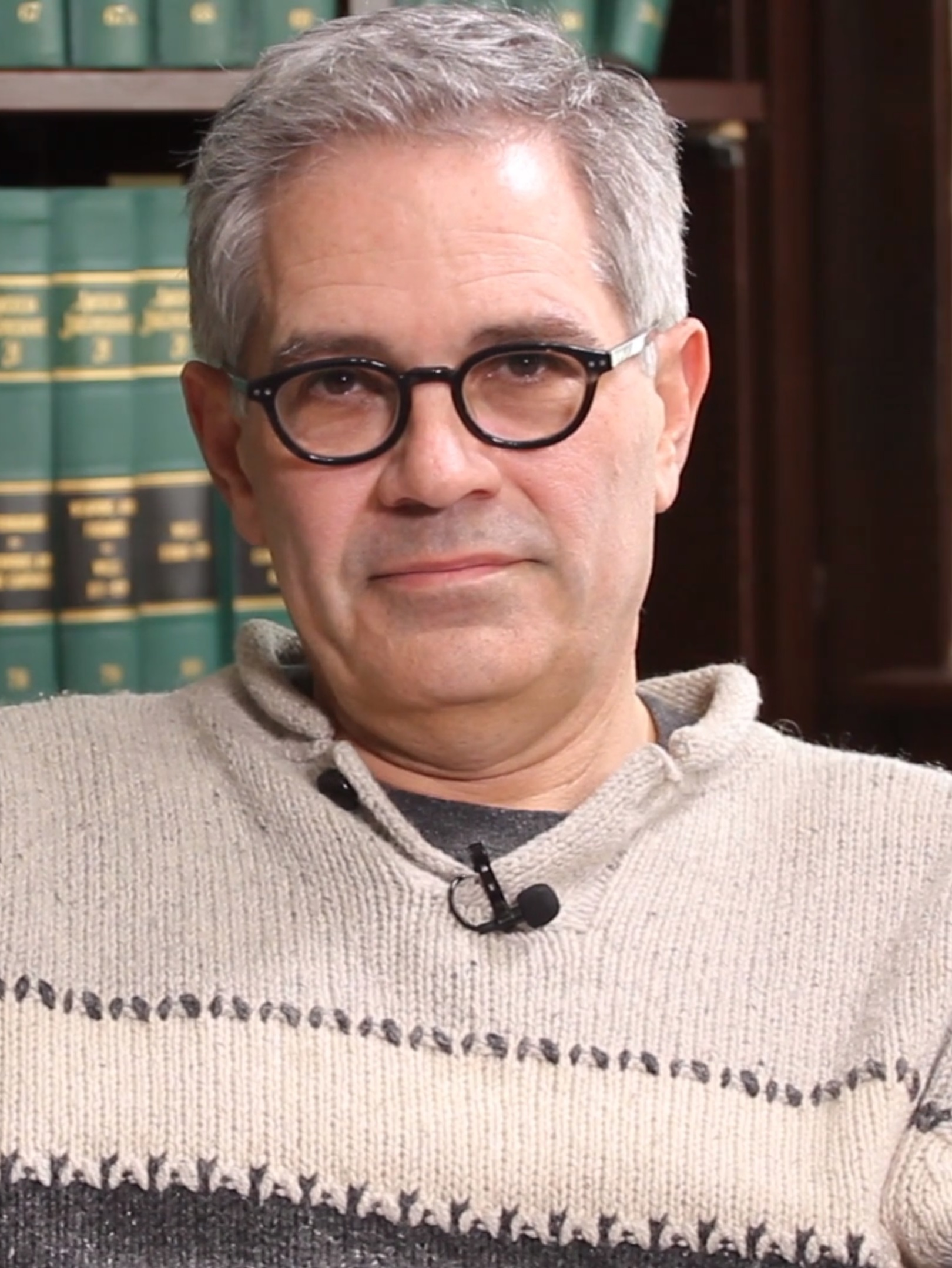

Candidate	Larry Krasner	Pat Dugan
Party	Democratic	Republican
Popular vote	276,126	86,305
Percentage	76.10%	23.78%
- Krasner: 50–60% 60–70% 70–80% 80–90% >90% Dugan: 50–60% 60–70% 70–80% 80–90% >90% Tie: 50%
District Attorney before election
Larry Krasner
Democratic
Elected District Attorney
Larry Krasner
Democratic

The 2025 Philadelphia District Attorney election was held on November 4, 2025, to elect the district attorney of Philadelphia. In the primary elections held on May 20, 2025, incumbent Larry Krasner, seeking a third term, easily won the Democratic nomination. His primary challenger, Pat Dugan, won the Republican primary as a write-in candidate and appeared on the general election ballot as a Republican.

Krasner won the general election in a landslide.

== Democratic primary ==
=== Candidates ===
==== Nominee ====
- Larry Krasner, incumbent district attorney (2018–present)

==== Eliminated in primary ====
- Patrick Dugan, former Philadelphia Municipal Court judge and candidate for Pennsylvania Superior Court in 2023

=== Endorsements ===
Larry Krasner

State legislators

- Anthony Williams, state senator from the 8th district (1999–present)

Local officials

- Kenyatta Johnson, president of the Philadelphia City Council (2024–present) and councilmember from the 2nd district (2012–present)

Labor unions

- AFSCME District Councils 33 and 47
- UNITE HERE
- Laborers International Union Local 332
- Service Employees International Union Pennsylvania
- Service Employees International Union Local 668

Organizations

- National Organization for Women Philadelphia
- Our Revolution
- Reclaim Philadelphia

Political parties

- Working Families Party Pennsylvania

Newspapers

- The Philadelphia Inquirer
- The Philadelphia Tribune
- Philadelphia Gay News
Patrick Dugan

State legislators

- Christine Tartaglione, state senator from the 2nd district (1995–present)
- Mike Driscoll, city councilmember from the 6th district (2022–present) and former state representative from the 173rd district (2015–2022)
- Amen Brown, state representative from the 190th district (2021–2022) and 10th district (2023–present)
- Sean Dougherty, state representative from the 172nd district (2025–present)
- Pat Gallagher, state representative from the 173rd district (2023–present)
- Ed Neilson, state representative from the 174th district (2015–present)
- Jared Solomon, state representative from the 202nd district (2017–present)

Labor unions

- Communications Workers of America Districts 2 and 13
- Communications Workers of America Local 13000
- International Longshoremen's Association Local 1291
- United Association Sprinkler Fitters Local 692
- Teamsters Joint Council 53
- Pennsylvania Conference of Teamsters
- Teamsters Local 830
- Transport Workers Union of America Local 234
- IAFF Local 22
- Philadelphia Building Trades and Construction Council
- Eastern Atlantic States Regional Council of Carpenters
Declined to endorse

Labor unions

- Philadelphia Council AFL-CIO

Political parties

- Philadelphia Democratic Party

=== Results ===
Primary results by ward Krasner: 50%–60%; 60%–70%; 70%–80%; 80%–90%; Dugan: 50%–60%; 60%–70%; 70%–80%; 80%–90%

2025 Philadelphia District Attorney Democratic primary results
Party	Candidate	Votes	%
Democratic	Larry Krasner (incumbent)	97,636	64.36%
Democratic	Patrick Dugan	53,849	35.50%
Write-in		211	0.14%
Total votes		151,696	100.00%

== Republican primary ==
No candidate filed to run for district attorney in the Republican primary, but two weeks before the election, Republicans began a campaign to encourage GOP voters to write in Larry Krasner's Democratic opponent Patrick Dugan as the Republican nominee. As a result, Dugan received over 6,000 of the approximately 7,000 votes cast.

Before the primaries Dugan's campaign said that he would not run as the Republican nominee even if he received the most votes, which they reiterated immediately after the election. However, in August Dugan announced that he would accept the Republican nomination.

=== Candidates ===
==== Nominee ====
- Patrick Dugan, former Philadelphia Municipal Court judge and candidate for Pennsylvania Superior Court in 2023

=== Results ===
2025 Philadelphia District Attorney Republican primary results
Party	Candidate	Votes	%
Write-in	Patrick Dugan	6,167	86.31%
Write-in	Scattering	977	13.67%
Total votes		7,145	100.00%

== General election ==
=== Post-primary endorsements ===
Larry Krasner (D)

U.S. representatives

- Bob Brady, former PA-01 (1998–2019) and chair of the Philadelphia Democratic Party (1986–present)

Labor unions

- AFSCME District Council 47

Organizations

- Reclaim Philadelphia

Newspapers

- The Philadelphia Tribune
- Philadelphia Gay News
Patrick Dugan (R)

State legislators

- Joe Picozzi, state senator from the 5th district (2025–present)

Local officials

- David Oh, former at-large city councilmember (2012–2023) and Republican nominee for mayor in 2023

Labor unions

- Roofers Local 30
- International Association of Firefighters Local 22

Political parties

- Forward Party of Pennsylvania

=== Results ===
2025 Philadelphia District Attorney election
Party	Candidate	Votes	%
Democratic	Larry Krasner (incumbent)	276,126	76.10%
Republican	Patrick Dugan	86,305	23.78%
Write-in		432	0.12%
Total votes		362,836	100.00%
