= 2022–23 Philadelphia City Council special election =

2022 Philadelphia City Council special election
- May 17, 2022 (6th District Special); November 8, 2022 (2 At Large, 7th, and 9th District Specials)

4 Seats on the Philadelphia City Council 9 seats needed for a majority
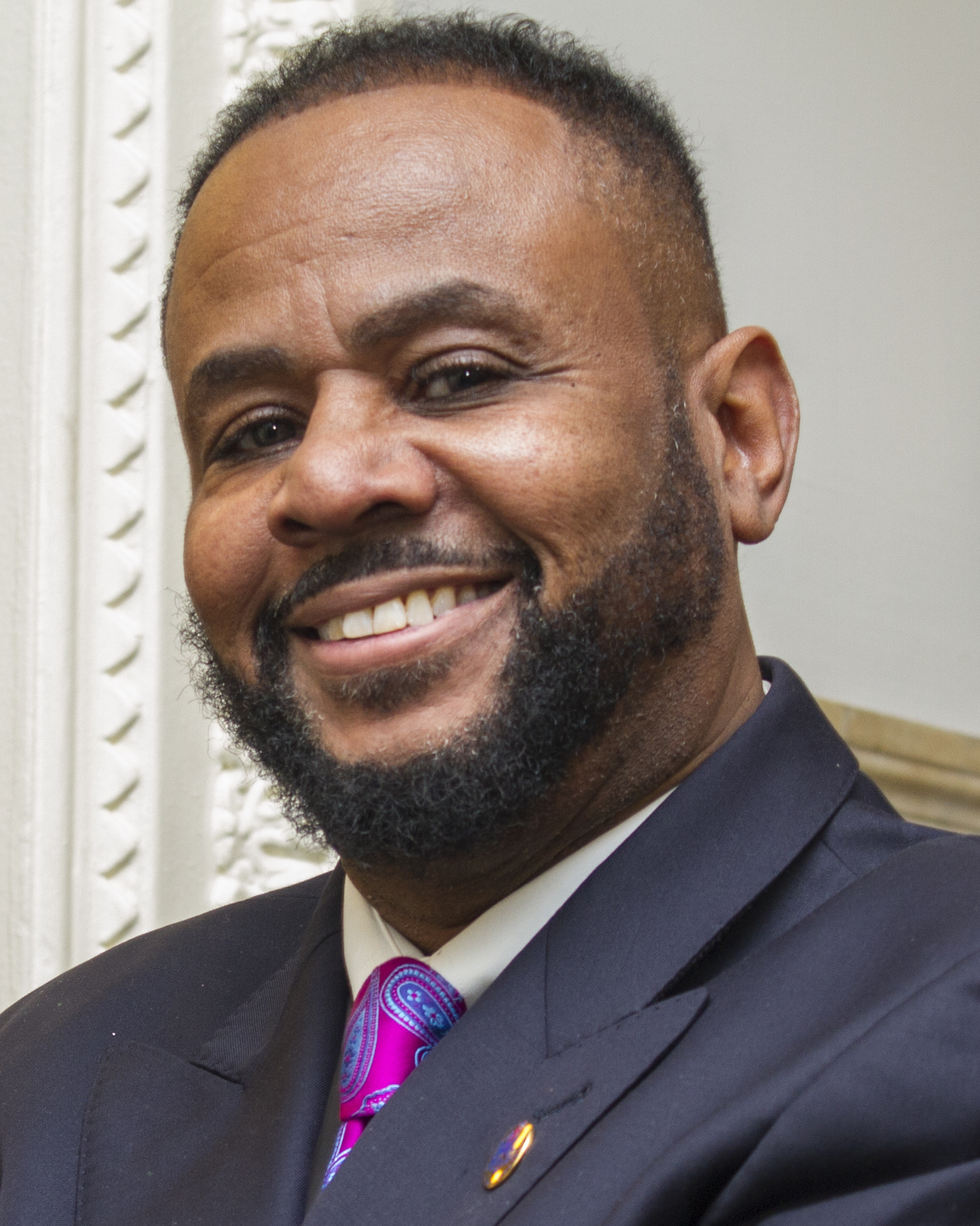

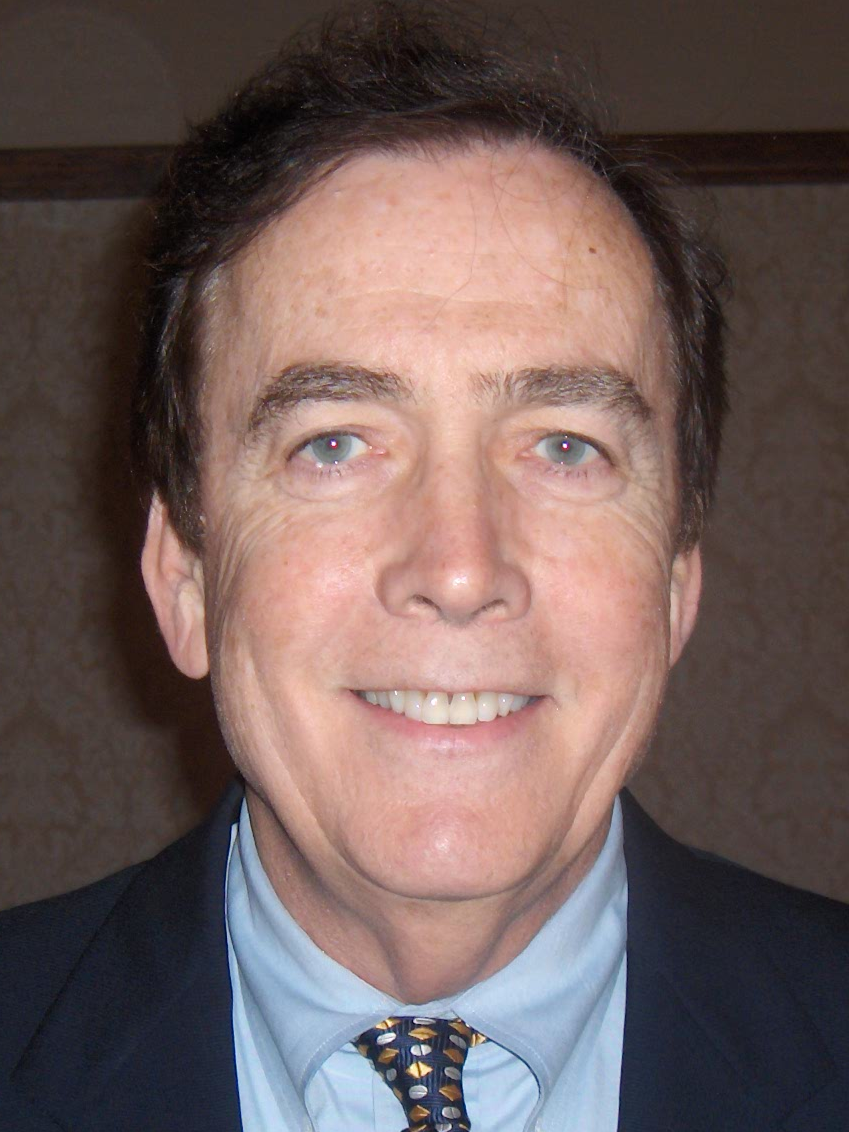

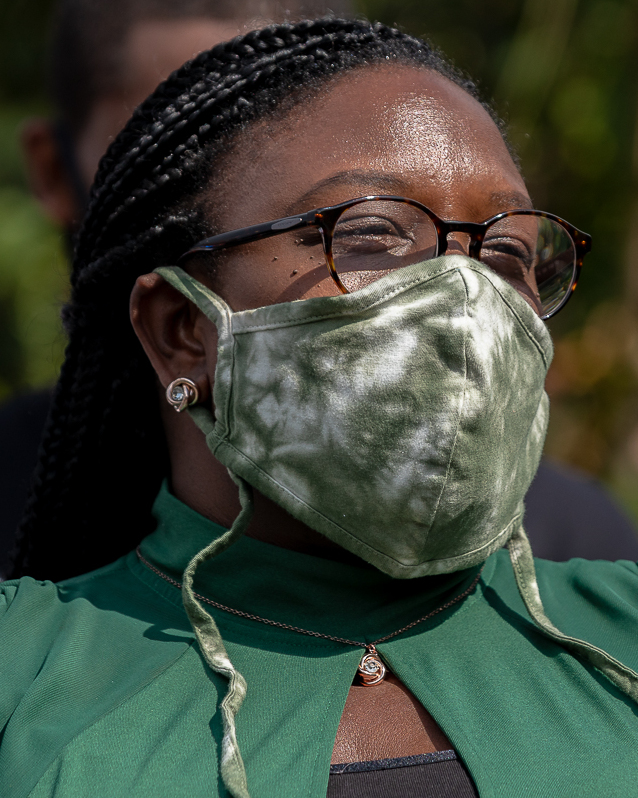
	First party	Second party	Third party
Leader	Curtis J. Jones Jr.	Brian O'Neill	Kendra Brooks (de facto)
Party	Democratic	Republican	Working Families
Leader's seat	District 4	District 10	At-Large
Seats before	10	2	1
Seats up	4	0	0
Seats won	4	0	0
Council President before election
Darrell L. Clarke
Democratic
Elected Council President
Darrell L. Clarke
Democratic

The 2022 Philadelphia City Council special elections were planned special elections in 2022. The reason for the special elections was at least five resignations from the Philadelphia City Council.

== Resignations ==
- Allan Domb, resigned from his at-large (Democratic) seat on August 15, 2022, to explore a run in the 2023 Philadelphia mayoral election
- Derek S. Green, resigned from his at-large (Democratic) seat on September 6, 2022, to run in the 2023 Philadelphia mayoral election
- Bobby Henon, resigned from his 6th District (Democratic) seat on January 20, 2022, due to being convicted on corruption charges
- Cherelle Parker, resigned from her 9th District (Democratic) seat on September 7, 2022, to run in the 2023 Philadelphia mayoral election
- Maria Quiñones-Sánchez, resigned from her 7th District (Democratic) seat on September 6, 2022, to run in the 2023 Philadelphia mayoral election

== 6th District ==
Bobby Henon resigned due to conviction of corruption charges, leading to a special election. City Council President Darrell L. Clarke announced a special election to fill Henon's seat on May 17, 2022. The Democratic nominee ran unopposed.

=== Democratic Party ===
- Michael Driscoll, state representative

=== Results ===
District 6, 2022 special election
Party	Candidate	Votes	%
Democratic	Michael Driscoll	10,668	98.00
Write-in		220	2.00
Total votes		10,888	100.00
Democratic hold			

== 7th District ==
2022 Philadelphia City Council 7th district special election
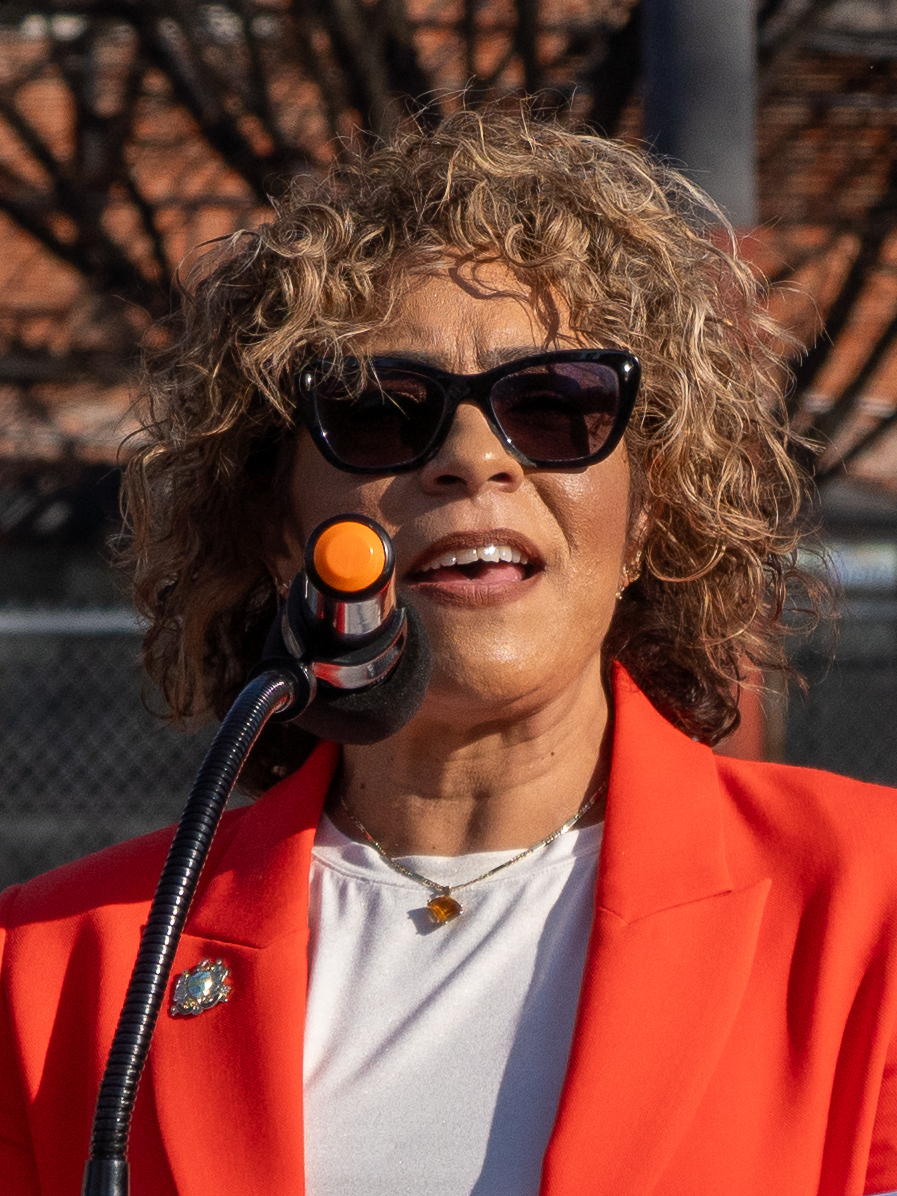

Candidate	Quetcy Lozada	James Whitehead
Party	Democratic	Republican
Popular vote	17,675	2,690
Percentage	84.85%	12.91%
- Results by precinct Lozada: 50–60% 60–70% 70–80% 80–90% >90%
Councilmember before election
Maria Quiñones-Sánchez
Democratic
Elected Councilmember
Quetcy Lozada
Democratic

Maria Quiñones-Sánchez resigned due to her run for mayor, leading to a special election. City Council President Darrell L. Clarke called a special election to fill Quinones-Sanchez's seat on November 8, 2022.

=== Democratic Party ===
- Quetcy Lozada, community organizer and chief of staff for incumbent Maria Quiñones-Sánchez

=== Republican Party ===
- James Whitehead

=== Libertarian Party ===
- Randall Justus

=== Results ===
District 7, 2022 special election
Party	Candidate	Votes	%
Democratic	Quetcy Lozada	17,675	84.85
Republican	James Whitehead	2,690	12.91
Libertarian	Randall Justus	392	1.88
Write-in		73	0.35
Total votes		20,830	100.00
Democratic hold			

== 9th District ==
2022 Philadelphia City Council 9th district special election
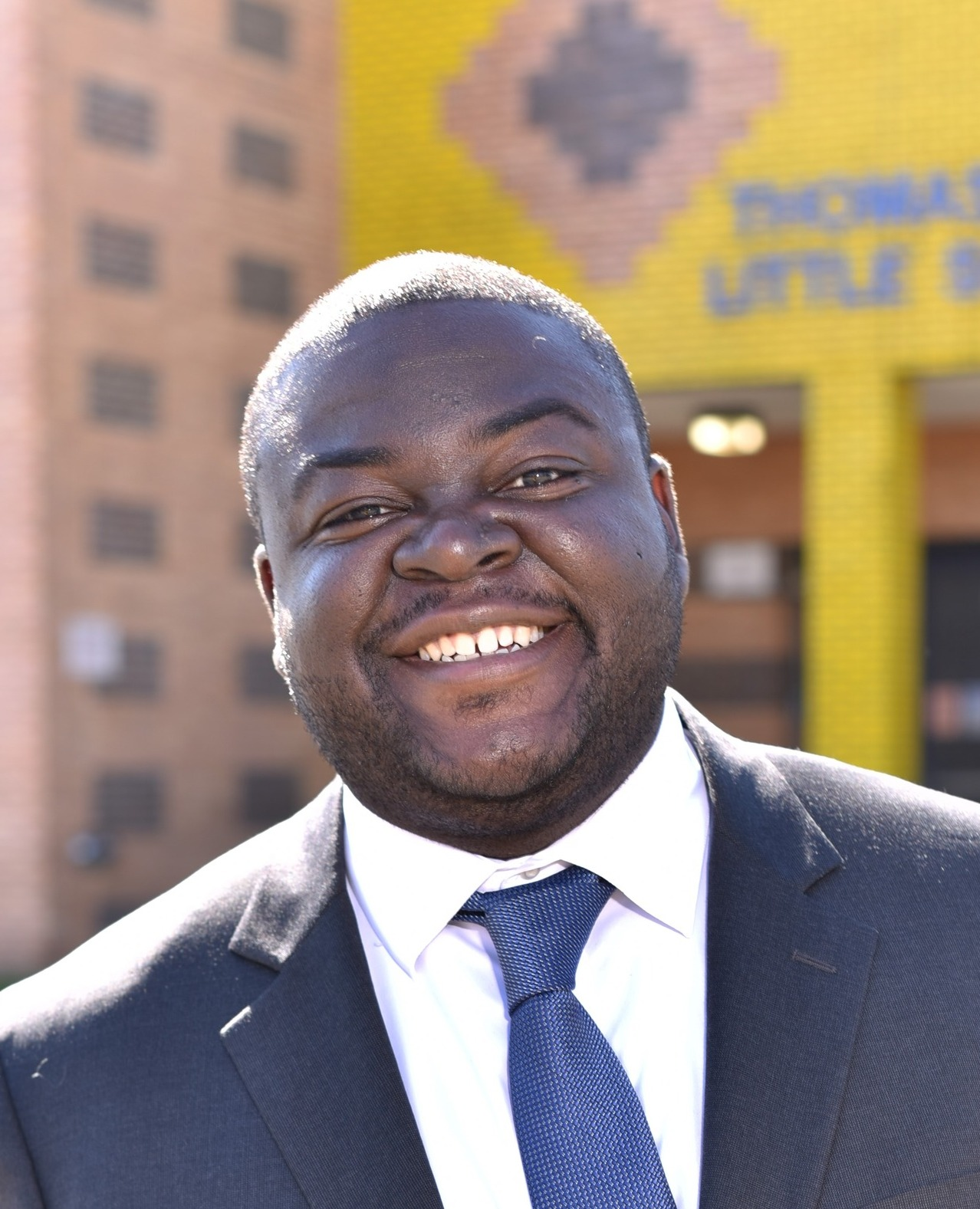

Candidate	Anthony Phillips	Roslyn Ross
Party	Democratic	Republican
Popular vote	33,851	2,975
Percentage	88.83%	7.81%
- Results by precinct Phillips: 50–60% 60–70% 70–80% 80–90% >90%
Councilmember before election
Cherelle Parker
Democratic
Elected Councilmember
Anthony Phillips
Democratic

Cherelle Parker resigned due to her run for mayor, leading to a special election. City Council President Darrell L. Clarke called to call a special election to fill Parker's seat on November 8, 2022.

=== Democratic Party ===
- Anthony Phillips, community organizer

=== Republican Party ===
- Roslyn Ross

=== Libertarian Party ===
- Yusuf Jackson

=== Results ===
District 9, 2022 special election
Party	Candidate	Votes	%
Democratic	Anthony Phillips	33,851	88.83
Republican	Roslyn Ross	2,975	7.81
Libertarian	Yusuf Jackson	1,222	3.21
Write-in		59	0.15
Total votes		38,107	100.00
Democratic hold			

== At-large seats ==
Allan Domb and Derek S. Green both resigned due to their possible runs for mayor, leading to a special election. City Council President Darrell L. Clarke was expected to call a special election in 2023. However, the seats may only be filled at the regular scheduled election.

=== Seat 1 ===
==== Democratic Party ====
- Jim Harrity, former aide to state senator Sharif Street

==== Republican Party ====
- Drew Murray, ward leader for the Philadelphia Republican Party

==== Libertarian Party ====
- Poetica Bey

==== Results ====

Philadelphia City Council Member At-Large District 1, 2022 special election
Party	Candidate	Votes	%
Democratic	Jim Harrity	383,852	80.37
Republican	Drew Murray	81,862	17.14
Libertarian	Poetica Bey	10,987	2.30
Write-in		891	0.19
Total votes		477,592	100.00
Democratic hold			

=== Seat 2 ===
==== Democratic Party ====
- Sharon Vaughn, chief of staff for incumbent Derek S. Green

==== Republican Party ====
- Jim Hasher, realtor and bar owner

==== Libertarian Party ====
- Marc Jurchak, chair of the Libertarian Party of Philadelphia

==== Results ====

Philadelphia City Council Member At-Large District 2, 2022 special election
Party	Candidate	Votes	%
Democratic	Sharon Vaughn	388,423	81.31
Republican	Jim Hasher	81,537	17.07
Libertarian	Marc Jurchak	7,061	1.48
Write-in		684	0.14
Total votes		477,705	100.00
Democratic hold			
