= 2027 Philadelphia mayoral election =

Local election in Pennsylvania, US

- November 2, 2027
Party	Democratic	Republican
Incumbent Mayor
Cherelle Parker
Democratic

The 2027 Philadelphia mayoral election will be held on November 2, 2027, to elect the mayor of Philadelphia. Incumbent Democratic mayor Cherelle Parker is eligible to seek re-election to a second term, but has not yet indicated if she will do so. The election will take place on the same day as the 2027 Philadelphia City Council election and other local elections in the commonwealth.

== Democratic primary ==
=== Background ===
In 2023, Parker won the Democratic primary with 32.6% of the vote, earning the nomination in a contest that saw wards won by four candidates. She went on to handily defeat Republican David Oh in the general election, garnering 74.7% of the vote.

Her major legislative priorities during her first term in office include a plan to build or preserve 30,000 units of housing stock, increasing city street cleaning services, and beginning periodic police sweeps of the Kensington neighborhood.

No incumbent mayor has lost reelection in Philadelphia in over 80 years.

=== Candidates ===
==== Declared ====
- Fareed Abdullah, special education coordinator and candidate for Philadelphia City Council in 2019
- Shania Bennett, former director of youth engagement for Philadelphia

==== Potential ====
- Kendra Brooks, at-large city councilmember (2019–present) (Working Families Party)
- Jamie Gauthier, city councilmember from the 3rd district (2019–present)
- Larry Krasner, Philadelphia district attorney (2018–present)
- Cherelle Parker, incumbent mayor
- Isaiah Thomas, at-large city councilmember (2024–present)
