= Jim Harrity =

American politician

Member of the Philadelphia City Council At-Large
- Incumbent
- Assumed office November 28, 2022
- Preceded by: Allan Domb

Personal details
- Born: 1972 (age 53–54)
- Party: Democratic
- Spouse: Marnie Aument Loughrey
- Children: 2

Jim Harrity (born 1972) is a Democratic politician and at-large member of Philadelphia City Council since 2022.

== Early life and education ==
Harrity was born and raised in Southwest Philadelphia to a working-class Irish Catholic family. He dropped out of high school when he was 17, later obtaining his GED at the Community College of Philadelphia.

== Career ==
Harrity worked in the restaurant industry before buying a stall in the food court of The Bellevue-Stratford Hotel where those involved in Philadelphia politics often hung out. It was there he met City Controller Jonathan Saidel who gave him a job as an investigator in his office.

Harrity developed an addiction to alcohol following the loss of his son in childbirth during his first marriage. During this period he left government and politics and worked in construction, finding employment with Laborers Local 57. Harrity moved to Kensington in 2007 to be with his partner Marnie Aument Loughrey, whom he credits with saving his life.

In 2010 he survived a heart attack after which he quit drinking, started attending Alcoholics Anonymous meetings, and volunteered on political campaigns. In 2016 he worked on Sharif Street’s successful state Senate campaign and left construction to join Street's office. In 2018, he became the executive director of Street's Senate office, a position he held until becoming political director of the Pennsylvania Democratic Party after Street was elected party chairman in 2022.

In 2022, four city council members resigned their seats to run for mayor and Harrity was chosen by Democratic ward leadership as the nominee to replace Allan Domb's at-large seat. Harrity and the other three Democratic nominees, Sharon Vaughn (politician), Quetcy Lozada, and Anthony Phillips (politician), all won seats during the 2022–23 Philadelphia City Council special election. Harrity ran for reelection in the 2023 Philadelphia City Council election receiving 6% of the vote in the primary placing 5th out of 27 candidates, enough to get a spot on the general election ballot. All Democratic city council members who won their primaries also won in the general election in November 2023, including Harrity.

=== City Council service ===
Harrity's priorities include crime reduction, specifically gun violence, renovation of aging schools and the construction of new ones, increased access for city youth to public parks, libraries, and recreation centers, employment issues, and addiction and homelessness.

Harrity introduced a worker protection bill which aims to safeguard some of the city's lowest-paid workers by requiring employers to rehire laid-off employees when a business changes its use. Although the bill passed unanimously in the Philadelphia City Council 2023 session, it was vetoed by Mayor Jim Kenney. Harrity reintroduced it in 2024 with technical adjustments, but there was strong opposition from the real estate industry and the Chamber of Commerce which criticized the bill as government overreach, arguing it interferes with hiring practices and could hinder efforts to repurpose downtown office buildings. Harrity said the bill simply asks employers to consider long-term employees who are already familiar with the building and the job. The bill passed again in 2024.

He is one of four council members who formed the Kensington Caucus to help address issues like homelessness and drug abuse in the Kensington and Harrowgate areas of Philadelphia. The caucus focuses on helping people with long-term recovery, bundling all services together including drug rehabilitation, halfway houses and behavioral health services. Harrity said it can take up to three months to get drugs out of a person's system before mental health treatment can be effective and wants to extend the typical 30-day treatment programs.

He was one of the first council members to support building a new 76ers arena to be located one block from Chinatown in Center City. However the owners of the Philadelphia 76ers and Wells Fargo Center, where the 76ers have been playing since 1996, worked out a deal to build a New South Philadelphia Arena. Harrity said he felt like a pawn as he and other city council members had put in extensive time to give permission for 76 Place at Market East to be built.

== Other roles ==
Harrity sits on the board of addiction nonprofit organization One Day at a Time, and is a member of Laborers’ International Union of North America.

== See also ==
- List of members of Philadelphia City Council since 1952
