= Michael McGeehan =

American politician

Member of the Pennsylvania House of Representatives from the 173rd district
- In office January 1, 1991 – January 6, 2015
- Preceded by: Frances Weston
- Succeeded by: Michael Driscoll

Personal details
- Born: November 26, 1960 (age 65) Philadelphia, Pennsylvania
- Party: Democratic
- Education: Saint Joseph's University

Michael P. McGeehan (born November 26, 1960) was a Democratic member of the Pennsylvania House of Representatives. He attended Father Judge High School (class of 1979) in Northeast Philadelphia followed by Saint Joseph's University (class of 1985) for undergraduate education.
