= Allan Domb =

American politician (born 1955)

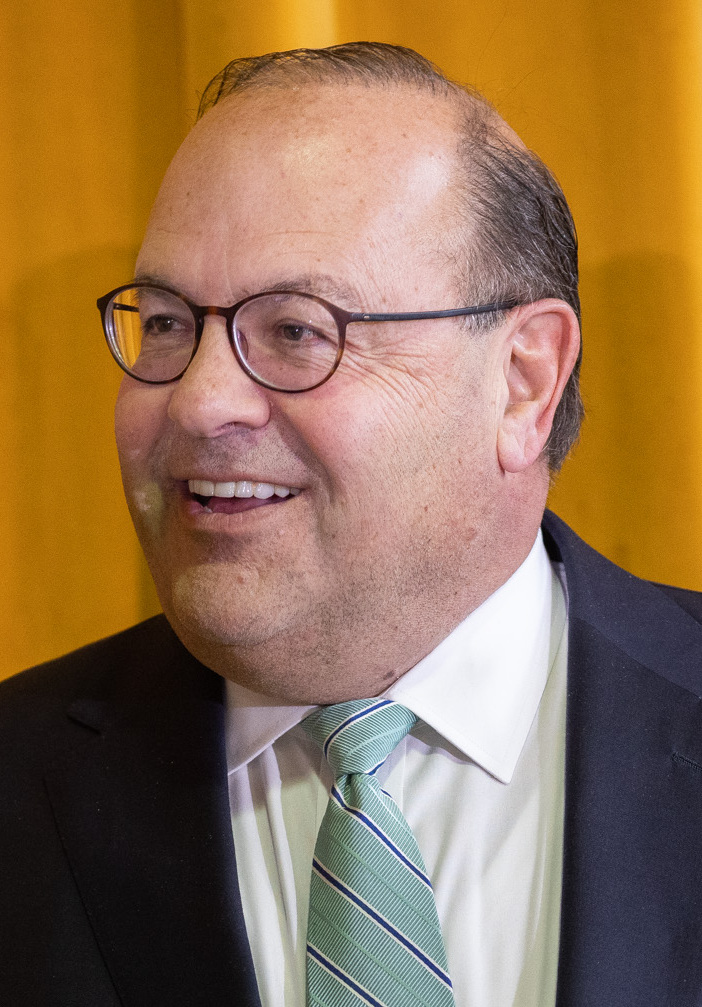

Member of the Philadelphia City Council from the at-large district
- In office January 4, 2016 – August 15, 2022
- Preceded by: W. Wilson Goode Jr.
- Succeeded by: Jim Harrity

Personal details
- Born: 1955 (age 70–71) Jersey City, New Jersey, U.S.
- Party: Democratic
- Education: American University (BA)

Michael Allan Domb (born 1955) is an American real estate developer and Democratic politician, who served as an at-large member of the Philadelphia City Council from 2016 to 2022. Born and raised in northern New Jersey, he moved to Philadelphia after graduating from college. After a successful career in Philadelphia real estate, he entered politics for the first time in 2015, being elected to the Philadelphia City Council. He stood unsuccessfully as a candidate in the 2023 Philadelphia Mayoral Election.

== Early life and education ==
Domb was born in 1955 in Jersey City, New Jersey, the second son of Edward Domb and Betty Schlesinger Domb. Domb's father and grandfather worked in the embroidery business. The family relocated to nearby Fort Lee, New Jersey, soon after Domb's birth. Domb and his older brother, Peter, had a series of odd jobs from a young age, shining shoes, shoveling snow, and mowing lawns. He graduated from Fort Lee High School in 1973 and started college at American University in Washington, D.C. Domb took evening classes there and worked full-time selling security systems for Phelps Time Lock Service in Hyattsville, Maryland. He graduated in 1977 with a marketing degree and continued to work for Phelps, being transferred to Philadelphia to manage the company's office in that city.

== Business career ==
To earn extra money while managing the Phelps office, Domb earned a real estate license at Temple University. As the real estate business became more profitable, he quit the security business job and sold real estate full time, opening his own office in 1983. Domb specialized in real estate near Philadelphia's Rittenhouse Square and soon became well-known among property buyers and sellers in that neighborhood. He was elected president of the Greater Philadelphia Association of Realtors (GPAR) in 1990, the youngest president that organization had ever elected. After success in real estate sales, Domb expanded into real estate development in 1999, and worked with restaurateur Stephen Starr to develop restaurants in Philadelphia.

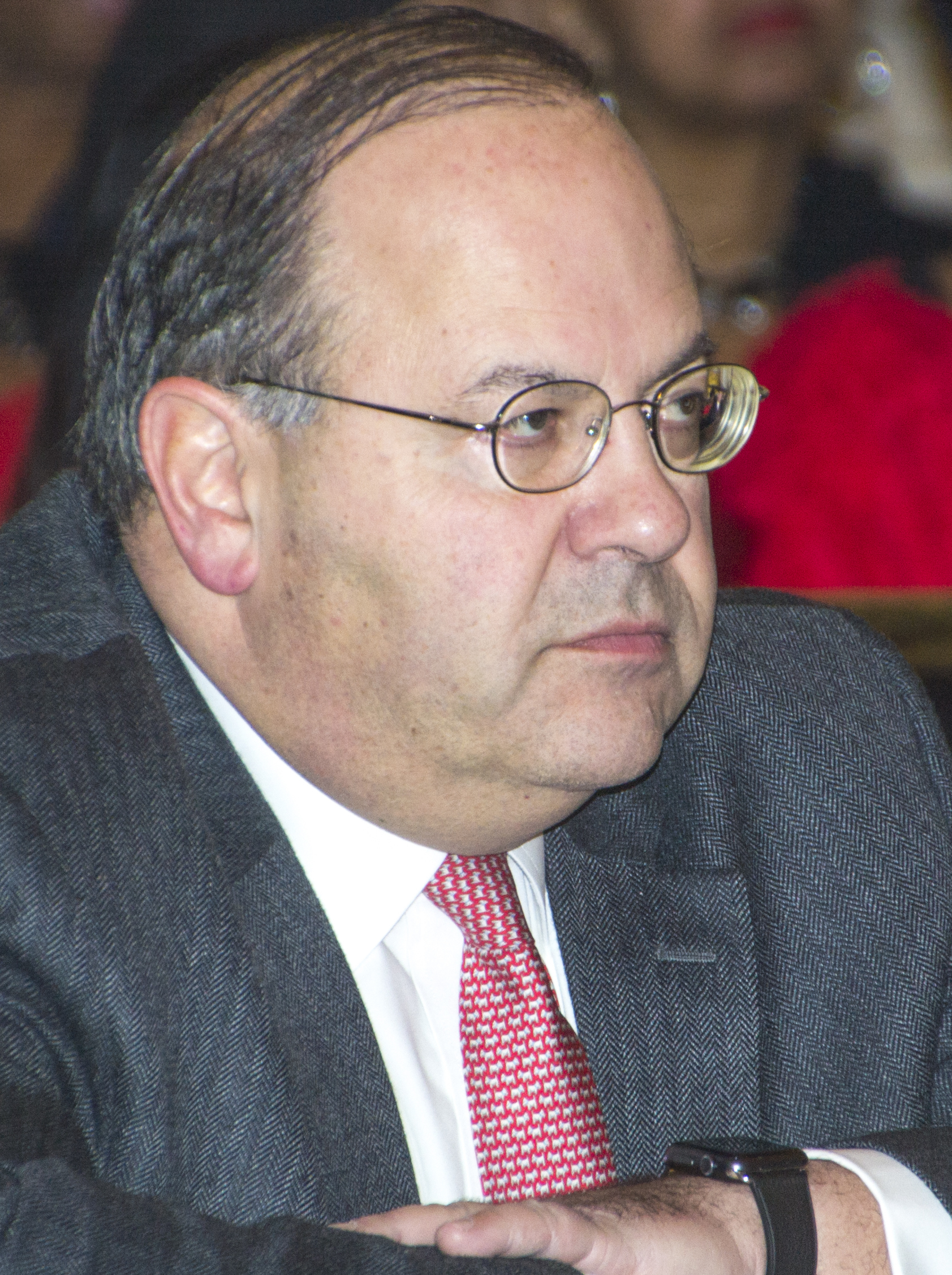
Domb in 2016

Domb was again elected president of the GPAR in 2013, by which time he had acquired the nickname "Philly Condo King." In his second term as GPAR president, he worked with Mayor Michael Nutter and the city government on ideas to collect delinquent property taxes and attract new residents to the city. He also worked with City Council President Darrell L. Clarke to determine the market value and ultimate disposition of some of the city's inactive school buildings. Even after entering politics, Domb remained active in the real estate business, purchasing a 19-story office building in April 2016.

== Political career ==
Nutter was term-limited, so the office of mayor would be open in the 2015 election. Domb, a registered independent, was said to be "testing the waters" as a possibly independent or Republican candidate for mayor. Instead, in May of that year, Domb announced he would run as a Democrat for one of the city's seven at-large council seats. Pledging some of his vast personal wealth to the cause, Domb described his goals in office: "We will talk about collecting taxes from out-of-state landlords and using that money to fund our schools. New job training programs. And partnering with our universities to mentor our children."

In the primary election that month, Domb placed third, winning one of the five Democratic nominations. In the general election in the majority-Democratic city, Domb again placed third, earning a seat on the council. In office, Domb continued to search for solution to the city's large number of tax-delinquent properties.

Domb resigned from the City Council on August 15, 2022, as prelude to an expected run for mayor in 2023. On November 15, 2022, he declared his candidacy for the Mayoral race. He was eliminated in the primary.

== See also ==
- List of members of Philadelphia City Council since 1952

== Sources ==
- "Previous Election Results". Resources & Data. Office of the Philadelphia City Commissioners.
- Adelman, Jacob (April 18, 2016). "Domb buys 1525 Locust for $17M". Philly.com.
- Featherman, John (January 18, 2015). "Is 'Mayor Domb' in Philly's future?". Philly.com.
- Kerkstra, Patrick (May 5, 2015). "Allan Domb Throws Big Bucks Into Council Campaign". Philadelphia.
- Otterbein, Holly (May 10, 2015). "It's Official: Allan Domb Is Running for Council". Philadelphia.
- Platt, Larry (March 25, 2016). "Has Allan Domb Lost His Mind?". The Philadelphia Citizen.
- Rooney, Shannon (April 10, 2013). "Property Profiles: Condo King Allan Domb". Philadelphia.
- Rothschild, Barbabra (March 31, 2015). "Real Estate Mahoffs: A Developing Story". Jewish Exponent. Philadelphia.
- Van Zuylen-Wood, Simon (October 11, 2015). "Allan Domb: The Condo King". Philadelphia.
- West, Tony (November 24, 2015). "Allan Domb Wants His Council Career To Make Philadelphia Great". Philadelphia Public Record.
- Orso, Anna; Walsh, Sean Collins (August 15, 2022). "Philly City Councilmember Allan Domb resigns ahead of expected run for mayor". The Philadelphia Inquirer.
- Walsh, Sean Collins (November 15, 2022). "Real estate magnate and former Councilmember Allan Domb is running for Philly mayor". www.inquirer.com.
