= Frances Weston =

American politician

Member of the Pennsylvania House of Representatives from the 173rd district
- In office 1981–1990
- Preceded by: Henry J. Giammarco
- Succeeded by: Michael McGeehan

Personal details
- Born: Frances Peteraf; January 9, 1954 Philadelphia, Pennsylvania, United States
- Died: December 24, 2005 (aged 51) Philadelphia, Pennsylvania, United States
- Party: Republican
- Spouse: John J. Egan Jr.
- Education: Temple University
- Occupation: Former government official

Frances Patricia Weston (September 1, 1954 – December 24, 2005), later known as Frances Egan, was a Republican member of the Pennsylvania House of Representatives.

== Formative years ==
Born as Frances Peteraf in Philadelphia, Pennsylvania on September 1, 1954, Frances Weston was a daughter of Alfred and Patricia Peteraf. A 1972 graduate of St. Hubert Catholic High School for Girls, she earned her Bachelor of Arts degree in political science at Temple University. At the time of her death, she was married to John J. Egan Jr.

== Career ==
Employed as an accounting supervisor by JC Penney, she was elected to the Pennsylvania House of Representatives as a Republican, and represented the 173rd legislative district in legislative sessions from 1981 through 1986. During her tenure, she served on the House Budget and Finance Committee from 1981 through 1986. In 1983, she ran an uncesseful campaign for controller in the city of Philadelphia. In 1986, she served as the coordinator for the 1986 gubernatorial campaign of William W. Scranton, III. The following year, she managed the mayoral campaign of John J. Egan Jr.

Opting not to run for reelection to the Pennsylvania House in 1990, she served as a commissioner for the Philadelphia Department of Licenses and Inspections from 1996 to 1999 and as assistant general manager of SEPTA, the Southeastern Pennsylvania Transportation Authority, from 1999 to 2005.

== Illness and death ==
Diagnosed with bone marrow cancer, she died at her home in Philadelphia on December 24, 2005.

== Public service activities ==
Weston has raised funds for Special Olympics.
