= Henry Giammarco =

American politician

Henry J. Giammarco

Member of the Pennsylvania House of Representatives from the 173rd district
- In office 1975–1980
- Preceded by: I. Harry Checchio
- Succeeded by: Frances Weston

Personal details
- Born: June 26, 1926
- Died: October 28, 2004 (aged 78) Philadelphia, Pennsylvania
- Party: Democratic

Henry J. Giammarco (June 26, 1926 – October 28, 2004) was a Democratic member of the Pennsylvania House of Representatives.
