= Dominick DeJoseph =

American politician

Member of the Pennsylvania House of Representatives from the 173rd district
- In office 1969–1970
- Preceded by: District created
- Succeeded by: Joseph P. Braig

Member of the Pennsylvania House of Representatives from the Philadelphia County district
- In office 1967–1968

Personal details
- Born: October 10, 1915 Philadelphia, Pennsylvania
- Died: January 8, 2000 (aged 84) Philadelphia, Pennsylvania
- Party: Republican

Dominick DeJoseph (October 10, 1915 – January 8, 2000) was a Republican member of the Pennsylvania House of Representatives.
