= Joseph Braig =

American politician and judge (1937–2020)

Joseph P. Braig

Member of the Pennsylvania House of Representatives from the 173rd district
- In office 1971–1972
- Preceded by: Dominick DeJoseph
- Succeeded by: I. Harry Checchio

Personal details
- Born: January 6, 1937 Philadelphia, Pennsylvania
- Died: 29 March 2020 (aged 83) West Chester, Pennsylvania
- Party: Democratic
- Education: LaSalle University, B.A.; Temple University, LL.B.
- Occupation: Judge, Court of Common Pleas, 1976-1988

Joseph P. Braig (January 6, 1937 – March 29, 2020) was an American politician and judge.

== Career ==
Braig served one term as an elected Democratic member of the Pennsylvania House of Representatives (1971–1972), representing a district in the City of Philadelphia. Four years later, he was elected to a judgeship on the Court of Common Pleas for Philadelphia County and sat from 1976 to 1988.

In 1986, Braig was named but not charged in a federal racketeering indictment with taking gifts from officials of the Roofers Union, with the intent to influence him as a judge. The Pennsylvania Supreme Court in 1991 found these accusations not to be sustained. Braig pleaded guilty on June 29, 1989, in the United States District Court for the Eastern District of Pennsylvania to three counts of mail fraud, which is a felony, based on his having submitted an inflated claim on his homeowner's insurance policy following damage to the family home. He was sentenced by Judge Norma L. Shapiro to serve three years' probation and to pay a $3000 fine in addition to $5500 in restitution. Braig died on 29 March 2020, at the age of 83.
