= I. Harry Checchio =

American politician

Member of the Pennsylvania House of Representatives from the 173rd district
- In office 1973–1974
- Preceded by: Joseph Braig
- Succeeded by: Henry J. Giammarco

Personal details
- Born: June 8, 1922 Philadelphia, Pennsylvania
- Died: November 17, 2003 (aged 81) Philadelphia, Pennsylvania
- Party: Republican

Isodor Harry Checchio (June 8, 1922 – November 23, 2003) was a former Republican member of the Pennsylvania House of Representatives.
