= Pennsylvania House of Representatives, District 173 =

American legislative district

Pennsylvania's 173rd State House of Representatives district
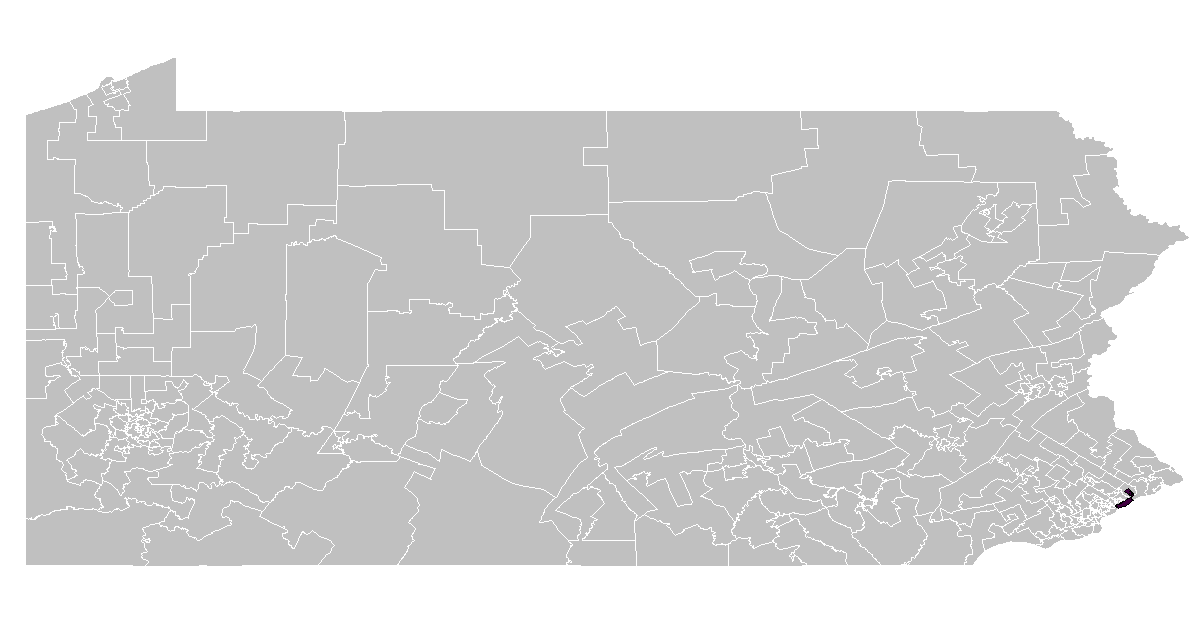
Representative
| Pat Gallagher; D–Philadelphia |

The 173rd Pennsylvania House of Representatives District is located in Philadelphia County and includes the following areas:

- Ward 41 [PART, Divisions 04, 06, 08, 09, 10, 11, 12, 13, 14, 15, 16, 17, 18, 20, 21, 22, 25 and 26]
- Ward 55 [PART, Divisions 04, 05, 07, 26 and 28]
- Ward 65
- Ward 66 [PART, Divisions 02, 07, 11, 17, 24, 29, 30, 32, 35, 36, 37, 42, 43, 44 and 45]

== Representatives ==
| Representative | Party | Years | District home | Note |
Prior to 1969, seats were apportioned by county.
| Dominick DeJoseph | Republican | 1969 – 1970 | | |
| Joseph P. Braig | Democrat | 1971 – 1972 | | |
| I. Harry Checchio | Republican | 1973 – 1974 | | |
| Henry J. Giammarco | Democratic | 1975 – 1980 | | |
| Frances Weston | Republican | 1981 – 1990 | | |
| Michael Patrick McGeehan | Democratic | 1991 – 2013 | | |
| Mike Driscoll | Democratic | 2014 – 2022 | | |
| Pat Gallagher | Democratic | 2023 – present | | |
