= Pat Gallagher (American politician) =

American politician

Patrick Gallagher

Member of the Pennsylvania House of Representatives from the 173rd district
- Incumbent
- Assumed office January 3, 2023
- Preceded by: Michael Driscoll

Personal details
- Born: April 21, 1974 (age 52) Philadelphia, Pennsylvania, U.S.
- Party: Democratic
- Education: Cardinal Dougherty High School; Temple University
- Website: Official website

Pat Gallagher (born April 21, 1974) is a Democratic member of the Pennsylvania House of Representatives, representing the 173rd District since 2023.

Political offices
Pennsylvania House of Representatives
Preceded by Michael Driscoll	Member of the Pennsylvania House of Representatives from the 173rd district 2023–present	Incumbent
