= 2027 Pennsylvania elections =

- November 2, 2027

Elections will be held in Pennsylvania to decide statewide judges and municipal officials on November 2, 2027. The primary elections will take place May 18.

== Justice of the Supreme Court ==
Justice Christine Donohue will reach the mandatory retirement age of 75 in 2027, necessitating an election to fill her seat. Another concurrent election for justice could be held as Chief Justice Debra Todd has indicated she will not seek retention in 2027.

== Judge of the Superior Court ==
President Judge Anne Lazarus' seat will be vacated as she reaches mandatory retirement at the end of 2027.

=== Democratic primary ===
==== Candidates ====
===== Declared =====
- Todd Eagen, labor attorney and candidate for Commonwealth Court in 2015 and 2017

== Judicial retention ==
Supreme Court Justice Sallie Updyke Mundy is up for retention to a ten-year term.
