= Jeffery Young Jr. =

American politician

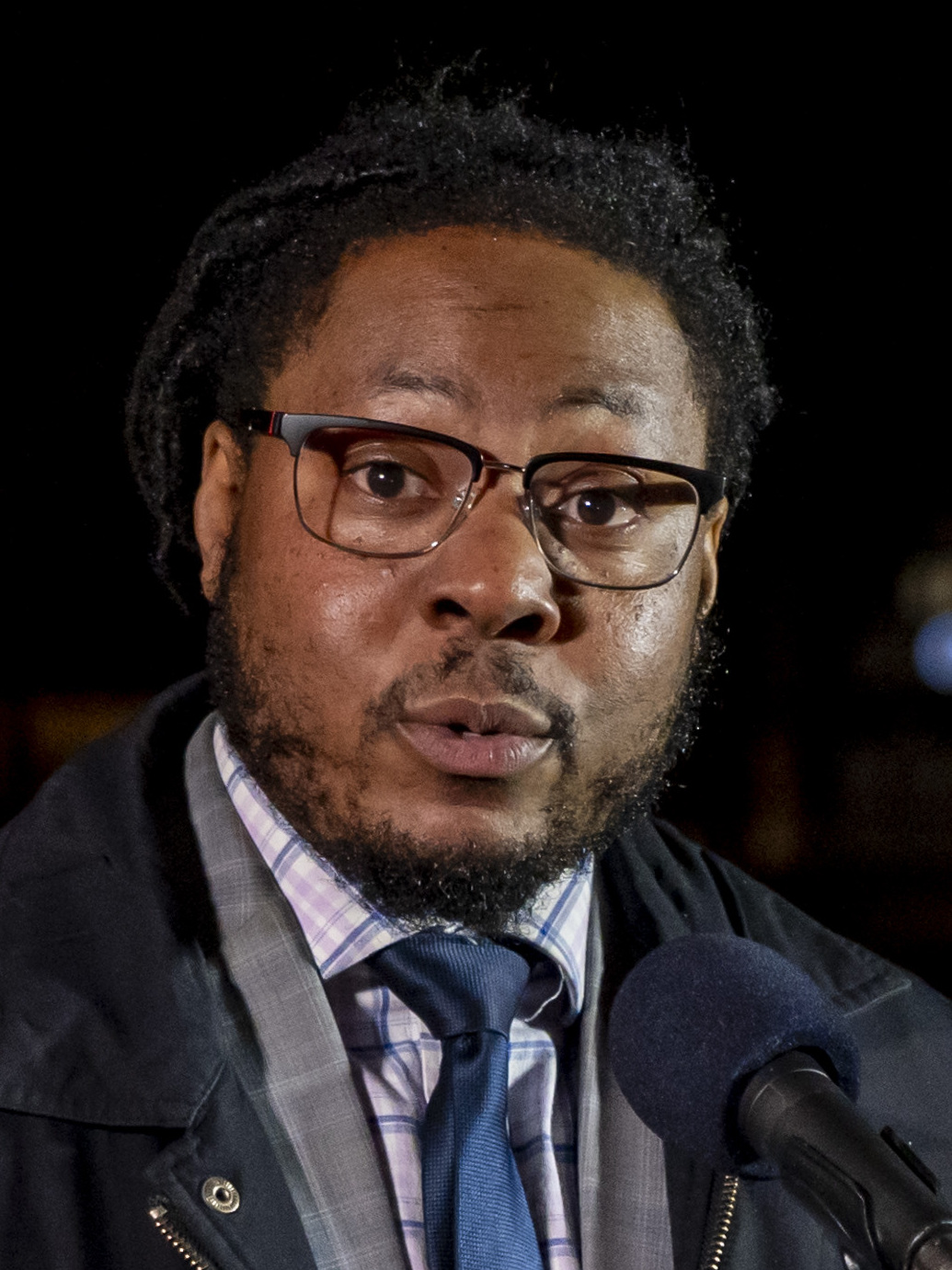
- Young in 2024

Member of the Philadelphia City Council from the 5th District
- Incumbent
- Assumed office January 2, 2024
- Preceded by: Darrell Clarke

Personal details
- Born: 1986 (age 39–40)
- Party: Democratic
- Profession: Attorney

Jeffery (Jay) Young Jr. (born 1986) is an American Democratic politician and member of the City Council of Philadelphia, Pennsylvania. In 2023, he was elected to represent the Fifth District which extends from the western side of Center City up though North Philadelphia to Temple University's campus and then up to Hunting Park. Before assuming office, he was legislative counsel to his predecessor Darrell Clarke.

== Early life and education ==
Young attended high school at Girard College. Needing an internship to graduate, he found three opportunities in city government working in City Councilmember Darrell L. Clarke’s and Blondell Reynolds Brown’s offices, and the Managing Director's Office during Mayor John Street’s administration.

Young earned a B.A. from Temple University and during college had internships with Mayor John Street and Councilmember Curtis J. Jones Jr. He attended Rutgers Law School graduating with a JD in 2012. During this time he interned with U.S. Senator Bob Casey's Washington office, the Philadelphia Register of Wills Office, and Community Legal Services.

== Career ==
Young passed the bar exam in 2013 and joined Clarke's Council office as an attorney until 2019. During his time in Clarke's office he gained experience in legal matters related to development. In 2019 he joined the Legis Group, specializing in real estate, government affairs and business law.

Young started gathering signatures to appear on the May 2023 primary ballot for the Philadelphia City Council 5th District race before Clarke announced he would not seek reelection. Meanwhile, six potential challengers were disqualified from running due to problems with their nominating petition. Although Young's petitions were also challenged, with all other candidates disqualified, the lawyer for one of his disqualified opponents chose not to pursue the issue, leaving Young as the sole candidate on the primary ballot.

Young is a proponent of councilmanic prerogative, the unwritten rule that district council members have final say over all manner of land use decisions within their district, because it helps prevent unwanted development in neighborhoods. Young has identified his top priorities as reducing gun violence, improving educational outcomes, increasing investment in youth, reforming public safety institutions, creating economic opportunities, and promoting sustainable and equitable development.

Young has been a critic of density, bike lanes and SEPTA, arguing that his constituents want more parking and less density.

Regarding climate change issues, Young said that natural gas can help fuel the economy until clean energy becomes more widely available. As of 2024 he does not support a ban on natural gas hookups in new construction but is open to it in the future. He said the city should incentivize more Philadelphians to use SEPTA through tax credits or other benefits, emphasizing the need to equip the public transit system with the infrastructure required to support a low-emission future.

=== Actions on housing ===
He is a frequent opponent of housing developments in his district. Soon after taking office he announced plans to pursue a lawsuit initiated by former City Council President Darrell L. Clarke against the Zoning Board of Adjustment (ZBA), contending that the board unlawfully granted a variance for a proposed apartment building on North Broad Street. Young has sought to fine property owners if they convert housing zoned for single-family housing into multiple apartments.

In 2024, Young blocked the construction of 57 senior affordable housing units on Diamond Street. The proposed senior housing development had been in the works since 2019, experienced delays by his predecessor Darren Clarke, and only required minor approvals before Young blocked it. Young designated a group run by his staffer Bonita Cummings, known for opposing most new housing, as the coordinating Registered Community Organization for the proposed housing development. In an April 2025 meeting, Cummings said that the senior affordable housing was akin to the Tuskegee syphilis experiment where African-Americans were deceptively injected with syphilis.

== See also ==
- List of members of Philadelphia City Council since 1952
