= Anthony Phillips (Philadelphia politician) =

American politician

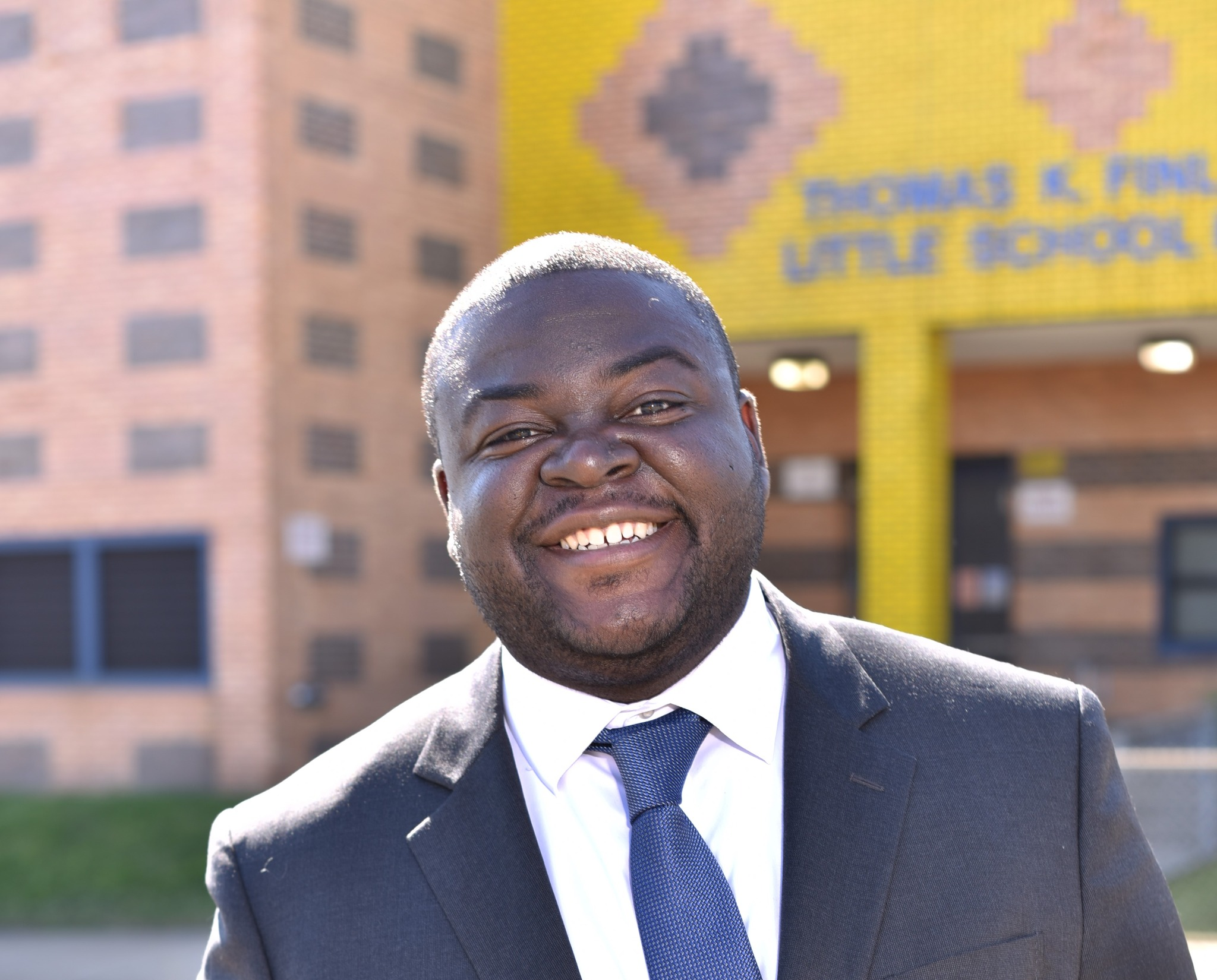
- Phillips in 2023

Member of the Philadelphia City Council, 9th District
- Incumbent
- Assumed office November 28, 2022
- Preceded by: Cherelle Parker

Personal details
- Born: 1988/1989 (age 37–38) North Philadelphia
- Party: Democratic
- Education: UMass Amherst, Yale University, Bates College, La Salle College High School
- Profession: Politician
- Website: Campaign website; Official website

Anthony Phillips is a Democratic member of Philadelphia's City Council, representing the 9th District. He is its youngest member. He replaced his mentor Cherelle Parker who had resigned to run for mayor, an election she subsequently won. Before Parker, the seat was held for 28 years by Marian Tasco. Phillips' council service has focused on issues of crime and safety, where he wrote and helped to pass bills addressing student pedestrian safety and crime reduction, introducing traffic calming measures and banning ski-masks in certain public places.

== Early life and education ==
Anthony Phillips was born in North Philadelphia, where he was raised by his mother, a civil servant at the Department of Human Services, and his grandmother, a maid and former sharecropper from South Carolina. When Phillips was eight, his family moved from Nicetown to Mount Airy, a move he attributed to a search for safety and quality schools.

Phillips is a graduate of La Salle College High School. He credits his mother working a night job at Walmart for funding his and his sisters' tuition.

He double-majored in African American studies and philosophy at Bates College and graduated with a bachelor's degree in 2010. While earning his degree, he studied at Morehouse College as a visiting student. After graduating, he went on to earn a master's degree in Black religion from Yale University. In May 2025, he earned his Ph.D. from the University of Massachusetts Amherst in Afro-American Studies where he researched the Black church in Philadelphia.

== Career ==
In 2003, Phillips attended a summit on Black youth leadership in Washington, D.C. As part of this summit, 14-year-old Phillips and other Philadelphia students co-founded Youth Action, a Philadelphia-based nonprofit. Though the organization initially focused on addressing teenage pregnancy, its scope expanded to "youth empowerment" more broadly with the mission of "helping young people access affordable college education and livable-wage jobs" according to Phillips. As of 2023, Youth Action is still operating with Phillips serving as executive director. In 2021, the organization had $40,000 in contributions and $196,000 in net assets.

Throughout Phillips's two decade involvement in Philadelphia political and civic life, his relationship with Cherelle Parker has been a common theme. The two met when Phillips was in high school and Parker spoke at an event organized by Youth Action. While Parker was serving as a state representative, Phillips was an intern in her office. Later on in 2018, Phillips became a committeeperson in Philadelphia's 50th Ward after Parker, ward leader and city council member at the time, called him about an opening.

=== City Council ===
On September 7, 2022, Cherelle Parker resigned from her 9th District City Council seat to run for mayor, leaving her seat open. Parker approached Phillips about running to replace her. Though initially responding to the idea with resistance, Phillips ultimately agreed and Parker began to work with ward leaders to advocate for him. With Parker's support, Phillips was chosen by the city's Democratic ward leaders and made the ballot for the November 8th special election. Phillips won the election with 88 percent of the vote and assumed office on November 28, 2022. He then began to campaign for the 2023 primary election, seeking to be the Democratic nominee for the upcoming general election and keep his current seat. Phillips won the primary with 63 percent of the vote and went on to the general election uncontested.

In his first years in office, Phillips has introduced or sponsored legislation including restrictions on street parking for semi-trucks and other large vehicles, affordable housing preservation, traffic calming around schools, and a controversial ski mask ban. Three of his bills were passed by the Philadelphia City Council including a ban on tractor trailer parking in residential areas, traffic calming measures to improve student pedestrian safety and the ski mask ban for which wearers can be fined $250 if worn in public places such as parks, schools, day-care centers, city-owned buildings, and public transit. The latter bill was passed in response to upticks in crime including fatal shootings on school property and SEPTA transit. While opposed by the ACLU, Phillips noted that recent shootings had been committed by people in ski masks making it more difficult to identify the perpetrators.

=== Committee assignments ===
As of July 2023:

- Children and Youth (chair)
- Education
- Intergenerational Affairs and Aging
- Labor and Civil Service
- Law and Government
- Legislative Oversight
- Technology and Information Services
- Transportation and Public Utilities
