= Quetcy Lozada =

American politician

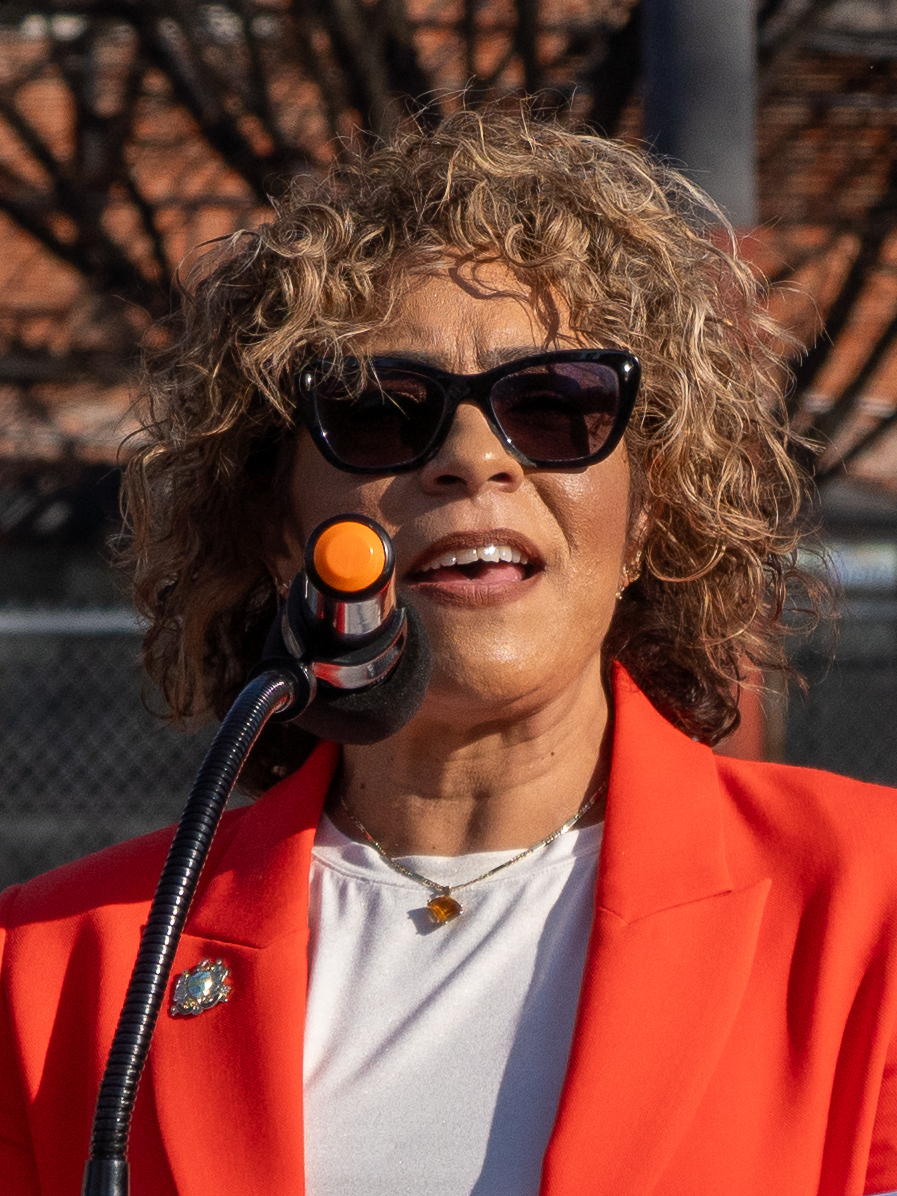

Member of the Philadelphia City Council from the 7th district
- Incumbent
- Assumed office November 28, 2022
- Preceded by: Maria Quiñones-Sánchez

Personal details
- Born: 1970 (age 55–56) Philadelphia, Pennsylvania, U.S.
- Party: Democratic

Quetcy Lozada (born 1970) is an American politician who represents the 7th Councilmanic District on the Philadelphia City Council since 2022.

== Early life and education ==
Lozada was born and raised in the Hunting Park section of Philadelphia. She earned an MBA in Human Resource Management from Lincoln University in 2019.

== Career ==
Lozada served as the Chief of Staff to Maria Quiñones-Sánchez. When Quinones-Sanchez resigned to run for Mayor, Lozada was nominated by the Ward Leaders in the 7th District over Angel Cruz for the special election nomination. She won the general election on November 8, 2022. She represents Kensington, Feltonville, Juniata Park, and Frankford on the council.

After taking office, Lozada pushed for the city to adopt an enforcement-focused strategy to combat the billion-dollar opioid trade that has severely impacted the neighborhood of Kensington, contributing to some of the highest gun violence rates in the city. In 2024 she proposed a law to force businesses such as bodegas, smoke-shops, and take-out restaurants in Kensington to close from 11 pm - 6 am. She said the nuisance activity from these businesses such as excessive trash interferes with quality of life in the Kensington community and that it's part of a strategy to address the open-air drug selling and criminal activity in the neighborhood.
