= Michael Driscoll (Pennsylvania politician) =

American politician (born 1960)

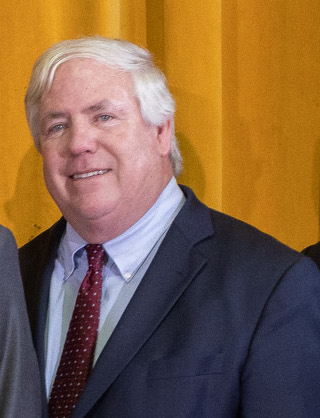

Member of the Philadelphia City Council from the 6th district
- Incumbent
- Assumed office June 10, 2022
- Preceded by: Bobby Henon

Member of the Pennsylvania House of Representatives from the 173rd district
- In office January 6, 2015 – June 8, 2022
- Preceded by: Michael McGeehan
- Succeeded by: Pat Gallagher

Personal details
- Born: March 20, 1960 (age 66) Philadelphia, Pennsylvania, U.S.
- Party: Democratic
- Spouse: Frances
- Children: 5
- Education: La Salle University (BA); University of Pennsylvania (MGA); Harvard Kennedy School (MPA)

Michael Joseph Driscoll (born March 20, 1960) is an American politician who serves as a Democratic member of the Philadelphia City Council, representing the 6th district since 2022. Prior to that, he served in the Pennsylvania House of Representatives representing the 173rd district.

== Early life and education ==
Driscoll was born in the Northeast region of Philadelphia, Pennsylvania on March 20, 1960. He attended Cardinal Dougherty High School, graduating in 1978, and received a Bachelor of Arts from La Salle University in 1982. He later received a Master of Government Administration from the University of Pennsylvania in 1986 and a Master in Public Administration from the Harvard Kennedy School in 1994.

Driscoll is of Irish descent and has roots in County Cork, County Mayo, and County Galway in Ireland.

== Business career ==
In 1997 Driscoll founded the iconic Irish Pub, "Finnigan's Wake" in a former casket factory in the Northern Liberties section of Philadelphia. It quickly became a popular meeting place for a wide spectrum of local Philadelphians, center city workers, tourists, celebrities, professional athletes and politicians from both sides of the aisle. Finnigan’s Wake also served as the epicenter of activity and events for the Irish community in the Philadelphia Region.

== Political career ==
=== Pennsylvania House of Representatives ===
Driscoll served as a member of the Pennsylvania House of Representatives for the 173rd district from 2015 to 2022. Prior to being elected, he served as deputy secretary of the Pennsylvania Department of General Services for seven years under Governor Bob Casey.

=== Philadelphia City Council ===
Driscoll sought a seat on the Philadelphia City Council for the 6th district after Councilman Bobby Henon had been convicted on federal bribery charges. Driscoll ran unopposed in the special election to replace Henon. He was sworn in on June 10, 2022. He also chairs the Transportation and Utilities Committee.

== Personal life ==
Driscoll lives in the Torresdale neighborhood of Philadelphia with his wife and children. Molly, Katie, Rose, Patrick, and Grace.

== See also ==
- List of members of Philadelphia City Council since 1952
