= Kendra Brooks =

American politician

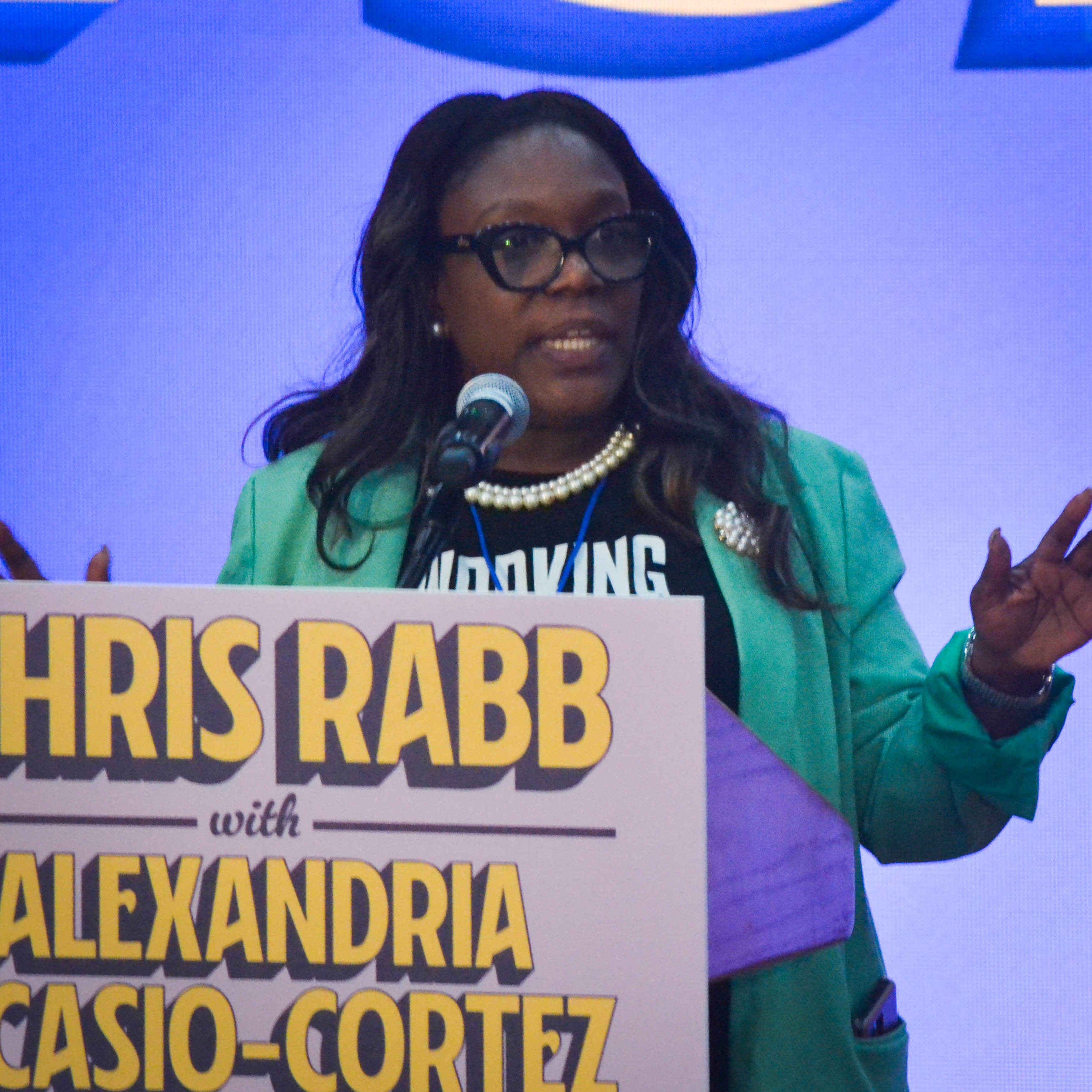
- Brooks in 2026

Minority Leader of the Philadelphia City Council
- Incumbent
- Assumed office January 1, 2024
- Preceded by: Brian J. O'Neill

Member of the Philadelphia City Council from the at-large district
- Incumbent
- Assumed office January 6, 2020
- Preceded by: Al Taubenberger

Personal details
- Born: Kendra Nicole Brooks; July 9, 1972 (age 54) New York City, New York, U.S.
- Party: Working Families
- Children: 4
- Education: Temple University (BS); Eastern University (MBA)

Kendra Nicole Brooks (born July 9, 1972) is an American politician and activist. Brooks, a member of the Working Families Party (WFP), won a citywide at-large seat in the election to Philadelphia City Council on November 5, 2019. The council has seven at-large seats that go to the highest overall vote-getters with two seats reserved for a minority party. Brooks's initial 2019 election was the first time a third party candidate won the minority party seat since its inception in 1919, through the creation of the modern Philadelphia City Council. Brooks won reelection to Philadelphia City Council in 2023.

== Early life and education ==
Kendra Nicole Brooks was born in the Bronx on July 9, 1972, and raised in Nicetown, Philadelphia. She studied at Community College of Philadelphia and worked as a nursing assistant. She later received a Bachelors of Science in therapeutic recreation from Temple University and an MBA in management from Eastern University.

== Career ==
Brooks worked with children with disabilities at Easter Seals for 17 years. Due to budget cuts, she was terminated, but remained on the school advisory council of her children's school, and became a neighborhood and educational activist. She also worked with the Parents United for Public Education and the Our City Our Schools coalitions, is on the Steering Committee of 215 People's Alliance, and founded Stand Up Nicetown, a group committed to ending gun violence.

For this activism, she was placed on Philadelphia Mayor Jim Kenney's nominating committee for the new Board of Education.

Brooks and Nicolas O’Rourke, a pastor, worked with the Pennsylvania chapter of the WFP to fundraise and organize a get out the vote campaign for the Council race. Due to longstanding tradition, Brooks, O'Rourke, and the WFP activists faced resistance from not only the Republican Party, but also the Philadelphia Democratic establishment, as many expected the remaining two at-large seats to continue to go to Republicans. Philadelphia's seven at-large council seats are determined by limited voting, where voters casting five equally-weighted ballots for five candidates, and the overall top-five finishers (recently presumed to always be Democrats) are joined by the top two vote-getters from a minority party (recently always the Republican party), regardless of actual finish placement as per the Home Rule Charter of 1951. Thus, for the WFP candidates to win, some Democratic-leaning voters would have to limit their ballots to only three Democrats in order to cast their votes for Brooks and O'Rourke. This rankled Democratic party leaders, who saw this as an opportunity for the Republicans to gain more than the two seats allotted. Bob Brady, former United States Representative and Chair of the Democratic City Committee, called for committee members and ward leaders who campaigned for non-Democrats to be expelled from the party.

Brooks was endorsed by Council At-Large member Helen Gym, Philadelphia District Attorney Larry Krasner, Pennsylvania State Representatives Chris Rabb, Elizabeth Fiedler, Malcolm Kenyatta, Movita Johnson-Harrell, Brian Sims, Pennsylvania State Senator Art Haywood, and Massachusetts US Senator Elizabeth Warren. Brooks was also endorsed by the Pennsylvania chapter of Make the Road, and the Philadelphia chapters of the Democratic Socialists of America, UNITE HERE, and Sunrise Movement.

Brooks and her campaign raised more money for a third-party candidate in a Philadelphia City-wide election than any previous candidate. She relied on small dollar donations as approximately two thirds of her donations were for $50 or less.

In the November 5, 2019, election, Brooks came in 6th overall in the at-large race, with 55,599 votes, almost 6,000 more than 7th-place finisher and top Republican vote-getter, incumbent David Oh, and over 11,000 votes ahead of 8th place Republican vote-getter, Al Taubenberger, ensuring her a place on the council.

In the November 7, 2023, election, Brooks reprised her sixth-place finish, securing the most votes among the non-Democratic candidates for City Council at-large and winning reelection to her seat on Philadelphia City Council.

=== Political positions ===
Brooks supports creating and preserving more affordable housing and expanding rent control, and is supportive of a Green New Deal for Philadelphia.

== Personal life ==
Brooks lives in Nicetown, Philadelphia with her four children.

== See also ==
- List of Democratic Socialists of America who have held office in the United States
- List of members of Philadelphia City Council since 1952
