= Philadelphia City Council =

Legislative body of Philadelphia, Pennsylvania, US

Type
- Type: Unicameral

Leadership
- President: Kenyatta Johnson, Democratic since January 2, 2024
- Majority Leader: Katherine Gilmore Richardson, Democratic since January 1, 2024
- Minority Leader: Kendra Brooks, Working Families since January 1, 2024

Structure
- Seats: 17
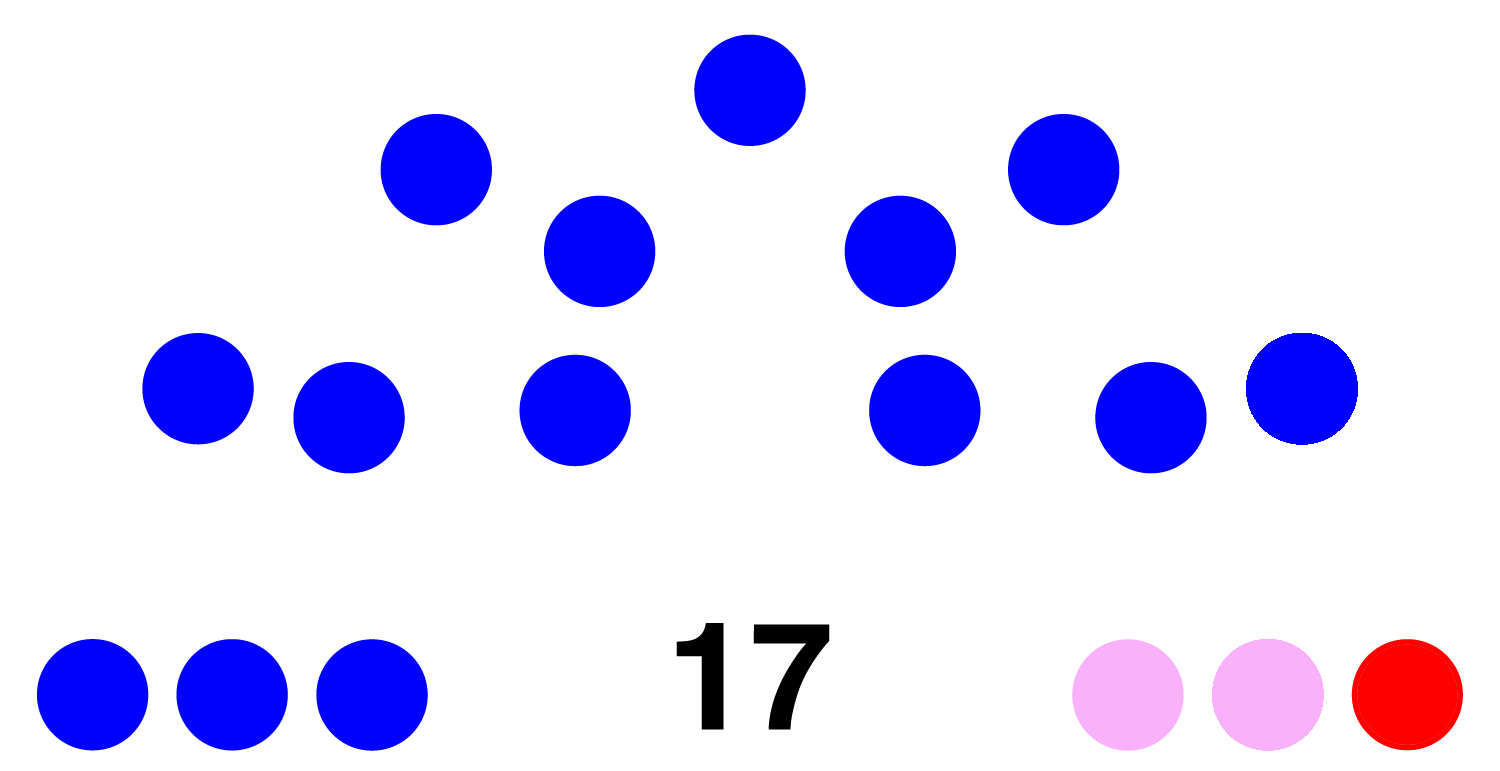
- Political groups: Democratic (14); Working Families (2); Republican (1)

Elections
- Voting system: First-past-the-post (for single-member district seats); Limited voting with limited nominations (for citywide at-large seats)
- Last election: November 7, 2023
- Next election: November 2, 2027

Meeting place
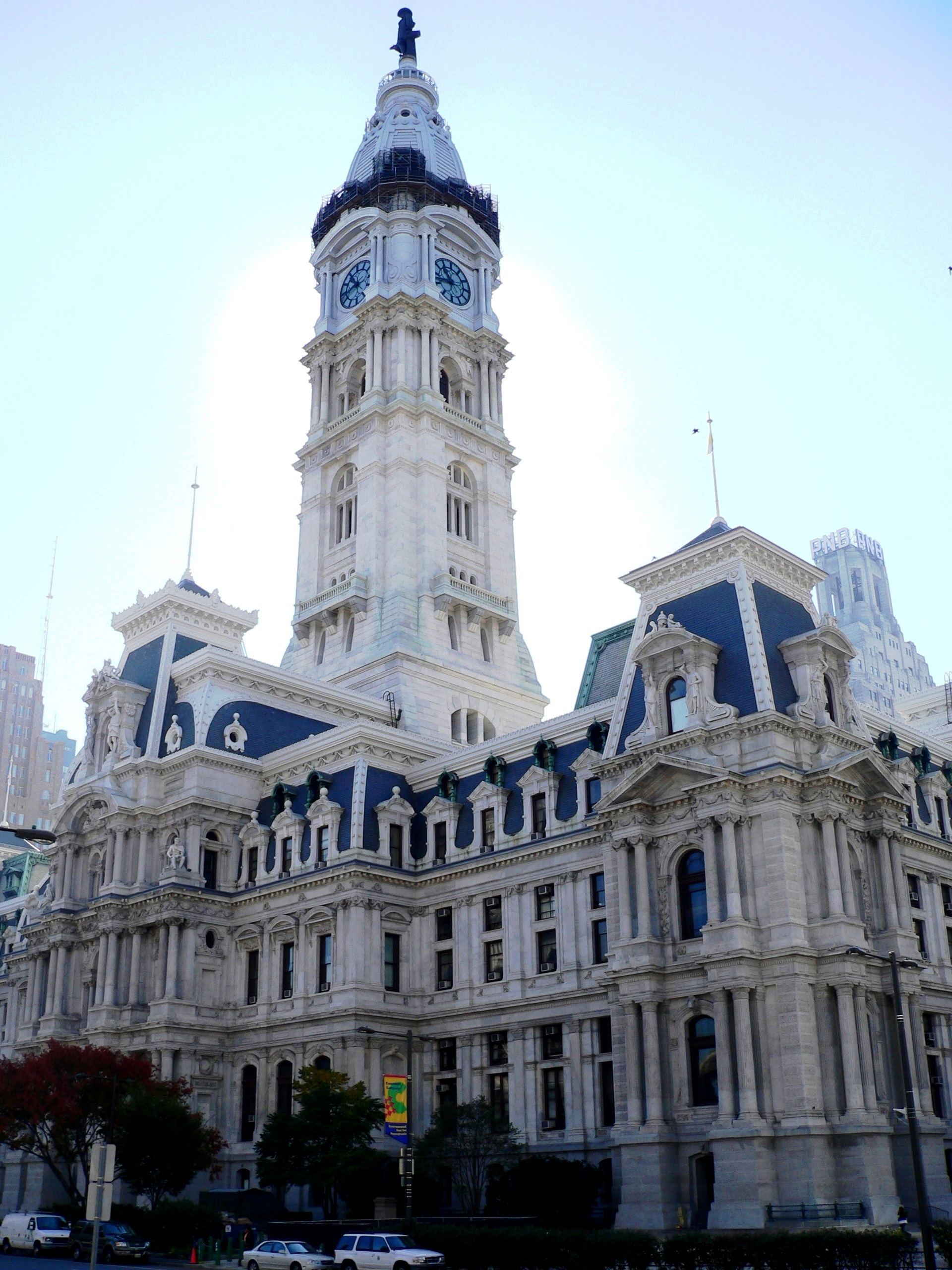
- Philadelphia City Hall

Website
- City Council Website

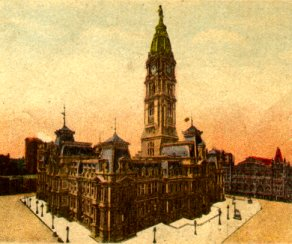
City Hall from postcard, c. 1900

Districts map of the council from the 2023 election (Interactive version)

Districts map of the council from the 2015 election until terms end in 2024 (Interactive version)

The Philadelphia City Council is the legislative body of the city of Philadelphia, Pennsylvania in the United States. It is composed of 17 councilmembers: ten members elected by district and seven members elected at-large from throughout the city.

The Council serves as a check against the Mayor of Philadelphia in a mayor-council system of government. Council can override mayoral vetoes with a two-thirds vote. Among other responsibilities, the Council approves the city budget proposed by the Mayor. Councilmembers are elected for four-year terms with no limits on the number of terms they may serve.

The head of the City Council is the Council President. The current Council President, Democrat Kenyatta Johnson, assumed office in January 2024. All proposed legislation is introduced by a councilmember and then the Council President refers proposed legislation to the appropriate committee.

Democrat Katherine Gilmore Richardson has headed the Democratic majority in the chamber as Majority Leader since January 2024. Working Families Party member Kendra Brooks is the Minority Leader, representing the Council's minority caucus since January 2024. The Working Families Party is the minority caucus with two seats, ahead of the Republican Party's one seat held by Brian J. O'Neill.

It is the only city council of a first class city in the United States in which the Republicans do not serve as the minority caucus while retaining a seat on the council.

== History ==
While William Penn's original 1691 charter for the city of Philadelphia included a "common council" with appointed members, no records exist of this body ever having been convened. Its successor, the Proprietor's Charter of 1701, constituted the city as a municipal corporation with a non-elected council made up of major city officials who selected their own successors. The colonial city government was abolished during the American Revolution and replaced in 1789 with an elected council including fifteen aldermen and thirty common councillors; these then elected a mayor and recorder who also were members of the council. In 1796, a bicameral city council was created including a 20-member Common Council elected annually and 12-member Select Council elected every three years; the sizes of both bodies increased with the population of the city, peaking at 149 members of Common Council and 41 in Select Council, the largest municipal legislature in the US. It was replaced with a single 21-member chamber in 1919, which remained in effect until the adoption of a Home Rule charter in 1951.

== Composition and term ==
The 1951 Home Rule Charter established the council as the legislative arm of Philadelphia municipal government, consisting of seventeen members. Ten council members are elected by district and seven from the city at large. At-large council members are elected using limited voting with limited nomination in which voters may only select five candidates on the ballot, and which guarantees that two minority-party or independent candidates are elected. Each is elected for a term of four years with no limit on the number of terms that may be served.

The members of City Council elect from among themselves a president, who serves as the regular chairperson of council meetings. In consultation with the majority of council members, the President appoints members to the various standing committees of the council. The president is also responsible for selecting and overseeing most Council employees.

Philadelphia City Councilmembers are some of the highest paid city councilors in the United States, receiving a base salary of $165,941 as of 2026.

== Legislative process ==
Every proposed ordinance is in the form of a bill introduced by a Council member. Before a bill can be enacted, it must be referred by the president of the council to an appropriate standing committee, considered at a public hearing and public meeting, reported out by the committee, printed as reported by the committee, distributed to the members of the council, and made available to the public. Passage of a bill requires the favorable vote of a majority of all members. A bill becomes law upon the approval of the mayor. If the mayor vetoes a bill, the council may override the veto by a two-thirds vote.

Under the rules of the council, regular public sessions are held weekly, usually on Thursday morning at 10:00am, in Room 400, City Hall. Council normally breaks for the summer months of July and August.

== Gerrymandering ==
In a 2006 computer study of local and state legislative districts, two of the city's ten council districts, the 5th and the 7th, were found to be among the least compact districts in the nation, giving rise to suspicions of gerrymandering. The Committee of Seventy, a non-partisan watchdog group for local elections, asked candidates for council in 2007 to support a list of ethics statements, including a call for fair redistricting, which should take place after the 2010 United States census. In 2011, the council approved a redistricting map with more compact boundaries, eliminating the gerrymandered borders of the 5th and 7th districts; it took effect for the 2015 elections.

== Councilmanic prerogative ==
Councilmanic prerogative is the legislative practice where a Philadelphia city council member has final say over land use in their district. Chicago has a similar practice called aldermanic prerogative. This unwritten practice affords council people who represent a geographically defined district unchecked power over land use decisions as it is custom for the 16 other council members to defer to them. A Pew study from 2015 uncovered that 726 of 730 Council votes on land use decisions were unanimous with only six total dissenting votes. This system can lead to conflicts of interest between council members and developers who want to change land use zoning or want to buy property below market rates in order to sell it at a higher price. Since 1981, of six council members convicted of misconduct all revolved around land-use.

Critics of councilmanic prerogative argue that it undermines government transparency and accountability, often operating in obscurity, thereby hindering development, fostering public mistrust, favoring political insiders, and allowing narrow interests to override broader city goals. District council members argue that prerogative appropriately empowers elected representatives to oversee land use projects, allowing them to safeguard their communities' interests, enhance development quality, and secure funding for local initiatives, based on their intimate knowledge of the neighborhoods they represent.

== City council members ==
As of January 2, 2024:

District	Name	Took office	Party
1	Mark Squilla	2012	Dem
2	Kenyatta Johnson, Council President	2012	Dem
3	Jamie Gauthier	2020	Dem
4	Curtis J. Jones Jr.	2008	Dem
5	Jeffery Young Jr.	2024	Dem
6	Michael Driscoll	2022	Dem
7	Quetcy Lozada	2022	Dem
8	Cindy Bass	2012	Dem
9	Anthony Phillips	2022	Dem
10	Brian J. O'Neill Leader of the Third Party	1980	Rep
At-large	Katherine Gilmore Richardson, Majority Leader	2020	Dem
At-large	Isaiah Thomas, Majority Whip	2020	Dem
At-large	Kendra Brooks, Minority Leader	2020	WFP
At-large	Jim Harrity	2022	Dem
At-large	Nina Ahmad	2024	Dem
At-large	Rue Landau	2024	Dem
At-large	Nicolas O'Rourke, Minority Whip	2024	WFP

== Presidents of the City Council ==
President	Term	Term end	Political party
James A. Finnegan	January 1, 1951	January 14, 1955	Democratic
James Tate	January 20, 1955	January 6, 1964	Democratic
Paul D'Ortona	January 6, 1964	January 3, 1972	Democratic
George X. Schwartz	January 3, 1972	May 29, 1980	Democratic
Joseph E. Coleman	October 30, 1980	January 6, 1992	Democratic
John F. Street	January 6, 1992	December 31, 1998	Democratic
Anna C. Verna	January 14, 1999	December 15, 2011	Democratic
Darrell L. Clarke	January 2, 2012	January 1, 2024	Democratic
Kenyatta Johnson	January 2, 2024	Incumbent	Democratic

== See also ==
- John Scott Medal
- List of members of Philadelphia City Council from 1920 to 1952
- List of members of Philadelphia City Council since 1952
