= History of the Jews in Philadelphia =

Jews in Philadelphia
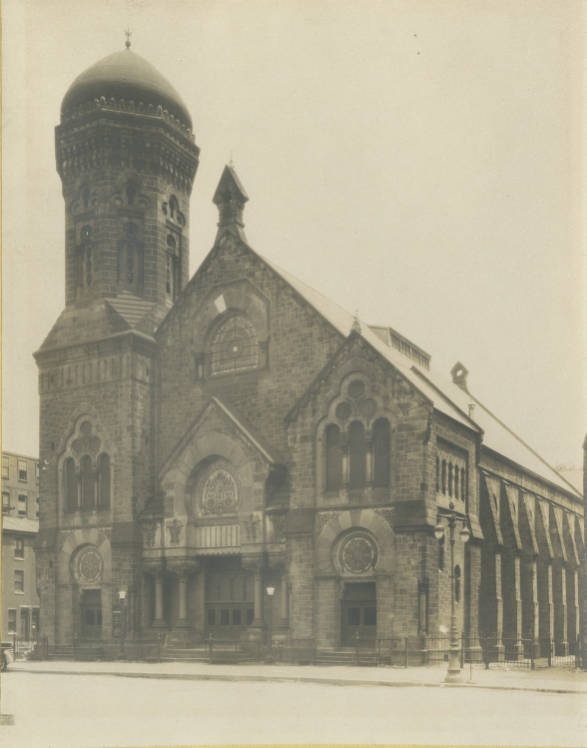
- Congregation Rodeph Shalom, built in 1866

Total population
- 350,000

Languages
- Philadelphia English, American English, Hebrew, Yiddish, Russian

Religion
- Reform Judaism, Conservative Judaism, Orthodox Judaism, irreligious

As of 2020, over 350,000 Jews live in the Philadelphia metropolitan area, making it one of the largest Jewish populations in the U.S.

Tracing its roots back to the Colonial era before the arrival of William Penn, the Philadelphia Jewish community established some of the nation's earliest congregations and institutions, playing a prominent role in both the American Revolution and the city's commercial and civic development.

Today, the metropolitan area's Jewish population spans a diverse range of religious and cultural denominations, ranging from long-standing Reform, Conservative, and Orthodox communities to growing Haredi enclaves in the surrounding suburbs.

== History ==
=== Colonia era ===
Jewish traders have operated in the Philadelphia metropolitan area since at least the 1650s. The first Jewish resident of the city on record was Jonas Aaron whose name appears in 1703 in the American Historical Register. Several Jewish families had immigrated to Philadelphia by 1734, as recorded by German traveler von Beck who listed them among the religious sects of the town. Nathan Levy purchased ground for Jewish burial in 1738, obtained the grant on September 25, 1740, and is cared for by Congregation Mikveh Israel.

=== American Revolution ===
Many Jews in Philadelphia took a prominent part in the War of Independence. Leading up to the conflict, several Jewish merchants and other citizens of Philadelphia signed the Non-Importation Resolutions. By doing so, they agreed "not to have any goods shipped from Great Britain until after the repeal of the Stamp Act." This was officially adopted on October 25, 1765. The Jewish signers included Benjamin Levy, David Franks, Samson Levy, Hyman Levy Jr., Mathias Bush, Moses Mordecai, Michael Gratz, and Barnard Gratz. The last two were brothers who had left Upper Silesia in Germany about 1755 and settled in Philadelphia.

In 1777, just after the outbreak of the American Revolutionary War, the following Jews agreed to accept the colonial paper money sanctioned by the king in lieu of gold and silver: Solomon Aaron, Joseph Solomon Kohn, Solomon Marache, Moses Mordecai, Barnard Soliman, and David Franks. Of these, Moses Mordecai and David Franks had signed the Non-Importation Resolutions.

During the conflict, David Franks was conspicuous for his loyalty to the British cause, being the English agent in charge of the prisoners; his daughter, Rebecca Franks, took part in the "Mischianza," the famous fête given in honor of General Howe during the British occupancy of Philadelphia. The majority of the Jews of the city, however, supported the American cause. Col. David Salisbury Franks was aide-de-camp to General Benedict Arnold at Philadelphia in 1779; Solomon Bush was major of the Pennsylvania militia; Col. Isaac Franks served with distinction in the war, as did Philip Moses, Russell and Benjamin Nones. Haym Solomon made loans to individuals in Congress, which were never repaid; his services as a financial agent during the war were invaluable. Another creditor of the Continental Congress was Aaron Levy, and his loans, like nearly all the others, were never fully repaid. At the close of the war the Jewish population of Philadelphia amounted to almost 500. In 1801, Rebecca Gratz helped establish the Female Association for the Relief of Women and Children in Reduced Circumstances, which helped women whose families were suffering after the American Revolutionary War.

=== Congregation Mikveh Israel ===
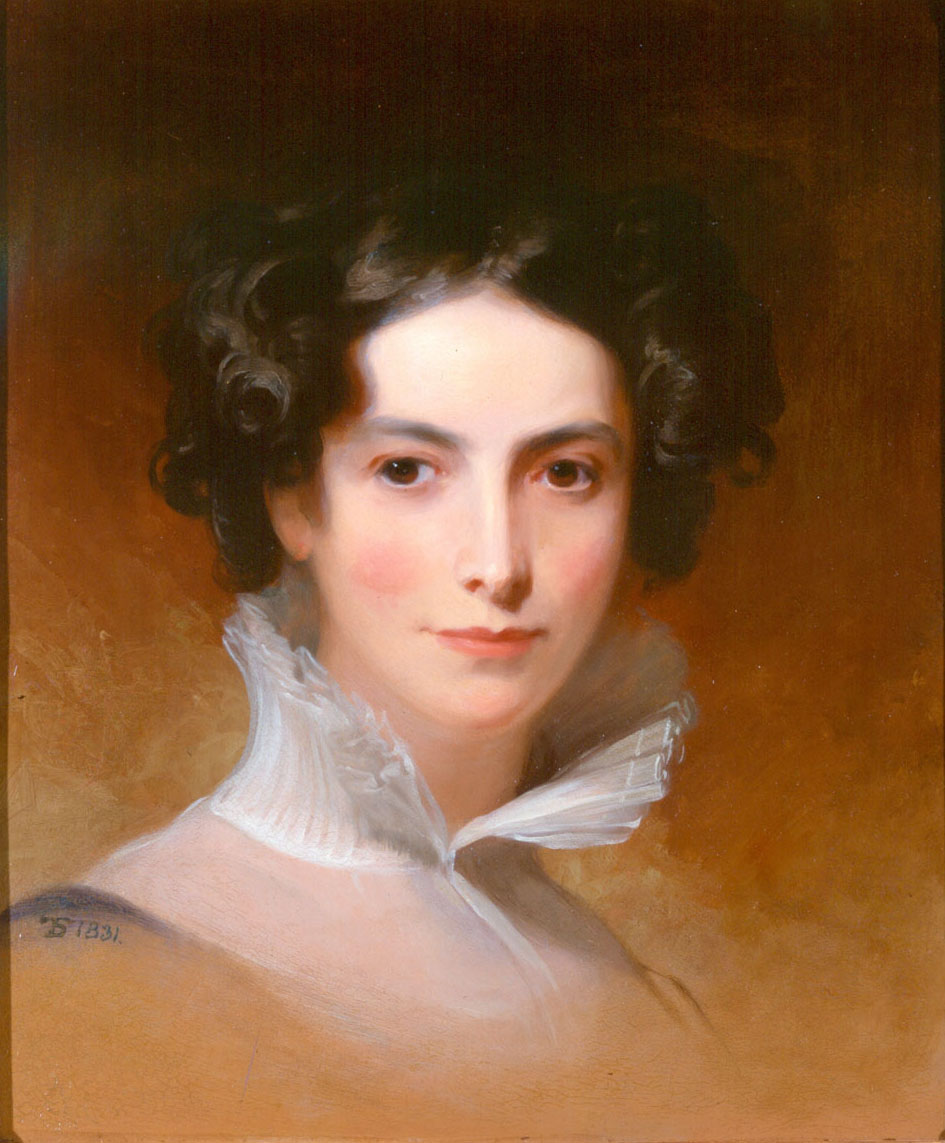
Rebecca Gratz, an educator, philanthropist, and member of Congregation Mikveh Israel

Congregation Mikveh Israel, the first Jewish congregation in Philadelphia, had its beginnings about 1745 and is believed to have worshiped in a small house in Sterling Alley. In 1761, owing to the influx of Spanish and Portuguese Jews from England, the Netherlands and the West Indies, the question of building a synagogue was raised, but nothing was then accomplished in that direction. In 1773, when Barnard Gratz was parnas and Solomon Marache treasurer, a subscription was started "in order to support our holy worship and establish it on a more solid foundation." The number of Jewish residents in Philadelphia was suddenly increased at the outbreak of the American Revolution by the influx of Jewish patriots from New York, which had been captured by the British (September 1776). The congregation removed from the house in Sterling Alley and then occupied quarters in Cherry Alley, between Third and Fourth streets.

The building in Cherry Alley, which had sufficed for the few families in the city, became inadequate, and steps were taken to secure a more commodious building. Gershom Mendes Seixas, who had fled from New York to Connecticut, was requested to act as the first rabbi of the reorganized congregation. The estimate for the new building was £600, and the subscription being inadequate, Haym Salomon, the banker and financial agent of the Continental Congress, agreed to pay one-fourth the cost. A lot was purchased in Cherry street, near Third street, and a suitable building erected. The governor of Pennsylvania and his official family were invited to attend the dedication ceremonies, which were held on September 13, 1782. At this time the congregation had over 100 members; its officers were Jonas Phillips (president), Michael Gratz, Solomon Marache, Solomon Myers Cohen, and Simon Nathan. On November 25, 1783, New York was evacuated by the British, and many of the members of the congregation returned to their former homes. The congregation also started Mikveh Israel Cemetery.

It is estimated that in 1775, the city of Philadelphia had a population of approximately 35,000 of whom 300 were Jewish. Mikveh Israel counted among its members revolutionary patriots including Jonas Phillips, the Gratz family, and Haym Solomon who financed the war.

When Washington was elected president of the United States the Congregation Mickvé Israel, together with the congregations of New York, Charleston, and Richmond, sent a congratulatory address, to which Washington replied (1790).

After Congregation Shearith Israel recalled the Rev. Gershom Mendez Seixas to New York, Congregation Mickvé Israel elected the Rev. Jacob Raphael Cohen in his stead. The latter had officiated as Chazzan of the Spanish and Portuguese synagogue in Montreal and had served in a like capacity in New York during the British occupation. He ministered to the Congregation Mickvé Israel until his death in Sept., 1811. As a result of the departure of its members, in 1788 the congregation encountered financial difficulties. A subscription list was started to meet the existing debts, and among those who contributed to it were Benjamin Franklin and David Rittenhouse. From this time on the congregation was ceaseless in its religious and charitable activities, and when Isaac Leeser's incumbency began, in 1829, it was, perhaps, the best-known synagogue in the United States. In 1815 Emanuel Nunes Carvalho was elected minister and continued in that capacity until his death in 1817; he was succeeded in 1824 by Abraham Israel Keys.

Mikveh Israel erected its first building in 1782 on Cherry Alley, as well as a parsonage, school, mikvah, and oven for Matza baking for Passover. A commemorative marker stands at that place. When the building became inadequate, the synagogue built a larger synagogue on the same site designed by William Strickland, a leading architect, which was completed in 1825. Prior to the Civil War (1861-1865) as the Jewish population grew and prospered, an elegant building was constructed on 7th Street, north of Arch designed by John McArthur Jr. (later, architect of City Hall of Philadelphia). Many Jews moved to the area between Broad and 16th Streets, north of Girard Avenue. A new building was constructed at Broad and York Streets in 1909, flanked by Gratz and Dropsie Colleges. Samuel Elkin and Henry G. Freeman Jr. donated $100,000; $40,500 for the site, $59,000 for the building in memory of Abraham and Eve Elkin.

Gratz College, a private, coeducational Jewish college in Melrose Park, Pennsylvania and traces its origins to 1856 when banker, philanthropist and communal leader Hyman Gratz, and the Hebrew Education Society of Philadelphia (established in 1849 by Rebecca Gratz and Isaac Leeser) united to establish a trust to create a Hebrew teachers college. The amount of the endowment was nearly $200,000, worth $6.4 million in 2019.

=== German immigration and reform ===
Congregation Rodeph Shalom was founded in 1795, and is the first Ashkenazic congregation established in the Western Hemisphere. In the last decade of the 18th century, a small group of Orthodox Jews from Germany, the Netherlands and Poland formed a minyan to worship in a manner consistent with their shared religious background. At first, services were held in various locations in Olde Philadelphia. In 1866, the congregation built its first sanctuary. Frank Furness, considered the most talented and exciting Philadelphia architect of his time, designed a Moorish-style synagogue on Broad and Mt. Vernon Streets.

The congregation soon outgrew its building and replaced it with the current structure, completed in 1928. Inspired by the great synagogue of Florence, Italy, Rodeph Shalom is one of the few synagogues in this country that retains the Byzantine-Moorish style. It was designed by the firm of Simon and Simon, which built the Fidelity Building on Broad Street. The sanctuary seats 1,640 people below star burst skylights. Its stained glass windows are one of the few remaining collections from the renowned D'Ascenzo Studio. The majestic bronze-and-enamel doors of the Torah ark grace the bimah. The D'Ascenzo Studio also designed the sanctuary's walls, ceiling, and dome, along with the carpet and ornamentation. The Broad Street Foyer houses the Leon J. and Julia S. Obermayer Collection of Jewish ritual art. More than 500 objects of Jewish ceremonial art from around the world dating back to the 18th century are on display. The Philadelphia Jewish Museum gallery, dedicated to Jacob Gutman, sponsors three to four exhibits of contemporary Jewish art each year, and is open for public viewing.

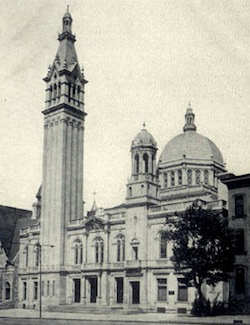
The historic synagogue of Keneseth Israel on Broad Street in North Philadelphia

The Reform Congregation Keneseth Israel was organized March 21, 1847. Its first Reader was B. H. Gotthelf, who held services in a hall at No. 528 N Second Street. The Reform movement, which had originated in Germany, soon extended itself to America, and L. Naumberg, Solomon Deutsch, and David Einhorn (1861–66) furthered its progress in this congregation. The first marked change in the character of the liturgy took place in 1856. Samuel Hirsch succeeded to the rabbinate in 1866; he introduced many changes in the service. In 1887 Joseph Krauskopf was elected rabbi; and contributed much to the success and standing of this congregation. It was during his incumbency that the Reform Congregation Keneseth Israel became the largest in Philadelphia. It had about 700 members in 1904. Its synagogue was situated on Broad Street, above Columbia Avenue from 1892 to 1957. In 1893 J. Leonard Levy was elected associate rabbi, but he resigned in 1902 to take up a rabbinical position in Pittsburg. The congregation supported a free public library and a reading-room prior to the opening of Philadelphia's Free Library. Senior Rabbis of Keneseth Israel since 1923 when Krauskopf died include William Fineshriber, Bertram W. Korn, Simeon Maslin and Lance J. Sussman.

In 1876, in commemoration of the centennial of American Independence, the Order B'nai B'rith and Israelites of America erected a statue representing Religious Liberty in Fairmount Park. Designed by Moses Ezekiel, it was the first public monument erected by Jews in the United States. The monument has since been relocated twice: in 1976, it was moved to the northeastern corner of Ben Gurion Way and 5th Street, adjacent to the building housing the Museum of American Jewish History and Congregation Mikveh Israel; and between 2005 and 2007, following the construction of a new facility for the museum (now the Weitzman National Museum of American Jewish History) at 5th and Market Streets, the statue was repositioned to give it greater prominence at that corner.

In Philadelphia, there were in 1904, not including lodges, over 160 Jewish organizations, of which over 50 are synagogues; the remainder consisting of hospitals, foster homes, Sunday-schools, benevolent associations, colleges, young men's Hebrew associations, social clubs, literary societies, etc. (A list of local organizations was published in the "American Jewish Year Book" for 5661 [1900-1].)

=== Eastern European immigration (1881-1924) ===
In the early years of Eastern European Jewish mass immigration in the 1880s, a size-able Jewish quarter was established in a well-defined area of old Philadelphia, today known as Society Hill and Queen Village. In The Presbyterian, a weekly journal published in Philadelphia in 1889 for the Presbyterian community, the editor wrote: "In Philadelphia we are likely to have a Jewish section, where emigrants from Eastern Europe will congregate. From Fifth Street to the Delaware River and south of Lombard Street these foreign Jews are crowding in, and being very poor, the Hebrew Charities are drawn upon heavily." The Jewish press saw a more confined quarter, extending from Spruce Street in the north to Christian Street in the South and from 3rd Street to 6th Street east to west. This was at a time when sweatshops were moving south from Kensington to Northern Liberties and then south of Market Street to Bank and Strawberry Streets. At this time, German-Jewish wholesale clothiers, like Snellenberg's, had their businesses on N. 3rd Street between Market and Arch streets. Many of these buildings stand today.

The Society Hachnasath Orechim, or Wayfarers' Lodge, was organized November 16, 1890, and chartered April 29, 1891; it was one of the most active charitable associations in Philadelphia. The Hebrew Literature Society, founded in 1885, opened a new building at 310 Catherine street. The Home for Hebrew Orphans, The Jewish Sheltering Home for the Homeless and Aged, the Mount Sinai Hospital Association, the Pannonia Beneficial Association, and the Central Talmud Torah were all situated in the southern portion of the city. In addition, the newcomers have many social, political, and literary organizations.

When immigrant steamers from Liverpool would arrive, trains of the Pennsylvania Railroad backed down onto the piers of the American Line to whisk away immigrants on their journeys to Chicago and places out west. A size-able number of Russian-Jewish immigrants stayed in Philadelphia and settled in the Jewish quarter. Many concentrated around the eastern end of South Street for three primary reasons: rent was inexpensive; housing was near the sweatshops; and the neighborhood was near the Emigrant Depot at the foot of Washington Avenue and the Delaware River. Prior to 1900, few Jews lived south of Washington Avenue. The Jewish Quarter of Philadelphia was bordered by Polish immigrants and Irish to the east, by African-Americans to the west and Italians to the southwest and, to the south, by Irish. Crossing well defined boundaries was dangerous for the immigrants. Curbside and pushcart markets were established; teams of horses flying over cobblestone streets made daily runs to the Dock Street wholesale market. Many Jewish immigrants opened businesses on Dock Street, that continue to operate to the present day including M. Levin & Co, Inc.

Central to the new immigrant neighborhood was South Street, called "the great Street for Polish Jews and huckstering of every variety." Some writers called it the Russian quarter because so many of the newcomers were from the Imperial Russian Empire. In 1887, the Public Ledger wrote: "On South Street many "neat" stores have been built and indications point to the further improvement of that old down-town avenue of retail trade." Dock Street, the wholesale food market of its day, "is not a handsome street; it is old, full of crude commercial bustle in the hours of the day, and after night fall or in the early hours of the night until the nocturnal preparations for the next day begin, it is almost wholly deserted." The first Yiddish theatre was in the center of the quarter, located at the corner of 5th and Gaskill Streets. It was here that actors of the Yiddish theatre performed, Jacob Adler and Boris Thomashevsky. In the 1890s, the S. 4th Street vegetable and meat market was started on the sidewalks; it eventually grew into the fabled S. 4th Street pushcart market, still remembered till this day.

Markets were located along S. 2nd Street, the Washington Market along Bainbridge Street from 3rd to 5th Streets and in the 4th Street pushcart market. Sweatshops in the quarter numbered over one hundred. On the 300 block of Lombard Street alone there were five sweatshops. After 1900, Jews moved south across Washington Avenue and within just a few years they lived in great numbers south of Washington Avenue and east of Broad Street. Many Jews in the clothing trade prospered during the 1920s and moved to West Philadelphia and Strawberry Mansion. After Congress cut off immigration from Eastern Europe in 1924, the old Jewish quarter began to die out. Although its demise was slowed, first by the Depression and then by the effects of World War II, outward movement from the quarter accelerated after the war ended. Today, there are four synagogues operating in the original Jewish quarter.

Two buildings originally built as synagogues—Congregation B'nai Abraham, 527 Lombard Street (built in 1910 and still continuing to operate and maintain a congregation), and nearby B'nai Rueben, 6th & Kater Streets (built in 1905 but used for commercial purposes since 1956, and converted residential in 2014)—survive.

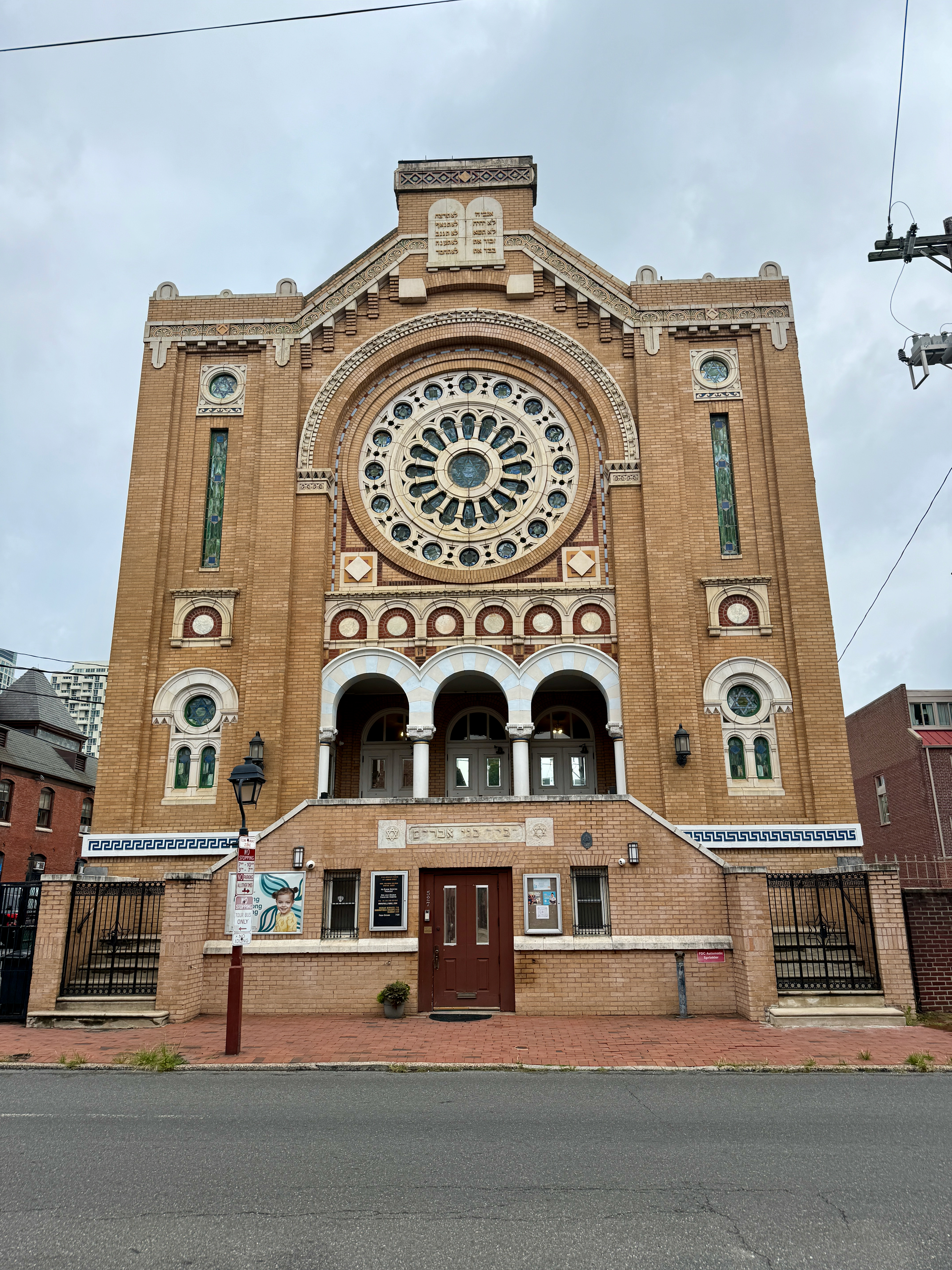
Congregation B'nai Abraham in Society Hill

Historic Congregation B'Nai Abraham is located in the Society Hill section of Center City Philadelphia, and is supported by a lay led leadership board who act as stewards of the historic building. The congregation was established in 1874 as the "Russian Shul" following a wave of immigration to the Jewish Quarter of Philadelphia at the time, fleeing from Czar Alexander II. It moved into present space around the 1910s, making it historically significant as the oldest building in Philadelphia that was originally constructed as a synagogue and has been in continuous use as such. With the departure of much of the neighborhood's Jewish population in the mid-twentieth century, the congregation was no longer able to support a full-time rabbi and frequently lacked a minyan for Shabbat services. In the early 21st century, it became affiliated with the Chabad movement and is now one of its two Center City synagogues.

Society Hill Synagogue, 418 Spruce Street, renovated and uses the historic building previously home to the Roumanian Shul from 1910 until the 1960s. Congregation Kesher Israel, 412 Lombard Street, acquired the former Universality Church building in 1889 and continues as an active Conservative synagogue.

=== Post World War II ===
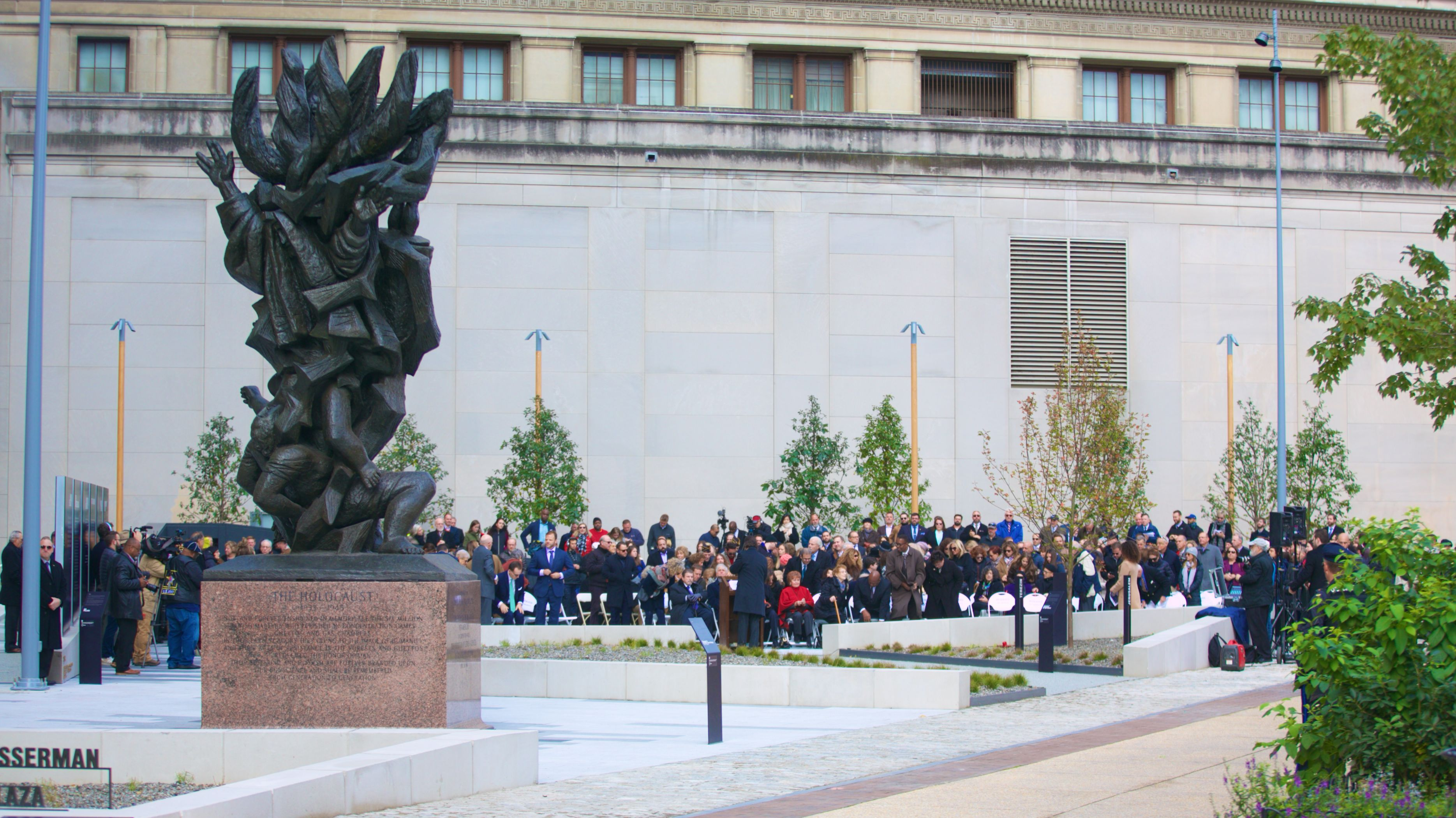
The Six Million Jewish Martyrs sculpture, by Holocaust survivor Nathan Rapoport, at Horwitz-Wasserman Holocaust Memorial Plaza

In 1964, the Six Million Jewish Martyrs sculpture, the first public memorial in the United States in remembrance of the Holocaust, was unveiled at 16th Street and Benjamin Franklin Parkway. In 2018, The Horwitz-Wasserman Holocaust Memorial Plaza was unveiled at the same site.

Philadelphia's Jewish community numbered 350,000 by 1976, making it the third largest Jewish community in the country. In January 1976, Israel's prime minister Yitzchak Rabin visited Philadelphia on the first stop of an 11-day U.S. tour where he visited the Liberty Bell, and addressed 3,000 people at the Academy of Music.

In 1976, Mikveh Israel moved to Independence Mall, close to its original site, together with the National Museum of American Jewish History. The building opened on July 4, 1976, the Nation's Bicentennial. In August 2010, the National Museum of American Jewish History moved to new building at 5th and Market Streets. The synagogue is now the sole inhabitant of the current building. The former exhibit space is now the Social Hall, decorated with paintings dating from the 1700s to the present from the Archives. There is also an exhibit in the lobby.

From the 1970s through the early 1990s, Philadelphia held an Israel Independence Day parade and festival at the Judge Lewis Quadrangle, the open plaza north of Independence Hall and the Liberty Hall since redeveloped for the Constitution Center. The 1991 festival attracted as many as 20,000 attendees and included remarks by Mayor Wilson Goode, and a telephone address by Israel's Deputy Foreign Minister Benjamin Netanyahu.

In 2026, a planned bike ride in support of boycotting Jewish businesses was widely condemned by officials on the local and state levels, calling it antisemitic. In response, hundreds of counterprotesters supported the businesses that the bikers had said to boycott.

=== Haredi community ===
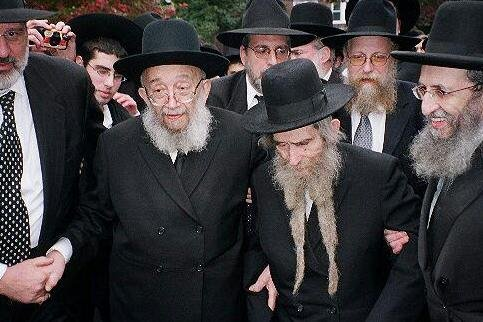
Left to right: Rabbis Elya Svei, Aharon Leib Shteinman, and Shmuel Kamenetzky

A Haredi community also exists in Philadelphia. The Talmudical Yeshiva of Philadelphia was founded in 1953. It is led by Rabbi Shmuel Kamenetzky, and formerly Rabbi Elya Svei also. The community also includes kollelim, such as the Philadelphia Community Kollel, founded in 2001 in Merion Station, and the Northeast Community Kollel.

Many Haredim in Philadelphia primarily live in Bala Cynwyd, and the community is centered around Aish HaTorah and the Philadelphia Community Kollel.

== Demographics ==
As of 2020, a Jewish Federations of North America study shows that Reform and Conservative are equally the largest Jewish denominations, accounting for 26% each. Those identifying as Orthodox, account for 8% of the population.

== Notable Jews from the Philadelphia metropolitan area ==
=== Settlers ===
- David Franks (1720–1794) – Merchant and Loyalist in the American Revolutionary War.
- Nathan Levy (1704–1853) – Merchant, established first Jewish cemetery in Philadelphia in 1740.
- Samson Levy (1757–1781) – Merchant, signer of the Non-Importation Resolutions in 1765.
- Isaac Miranda – First Jew in the English colonies to hold a judicial position, arrived in Philadelphia about 1710 where he engaged in trade with native peoples and eventually owned property in the town.

=== Art ===
- Theresa Bernstein (1890–2002) – Polish-born painter who was one of the Philadelphia Ten.
- Stella Drabkin (1906–1971) – Painter.
- Simon Hassler (1832–1901) – German born conductor and composer.
- Sylvia Kauders (1921–2016) – Actress.
- Philip Loeb (1891–1955) – Stage, film and television actor.
- Sarai Sherman (1922–2013) – Painter and sculptor.
- David Corenswet (1993–) – Actor.

=== Business ===
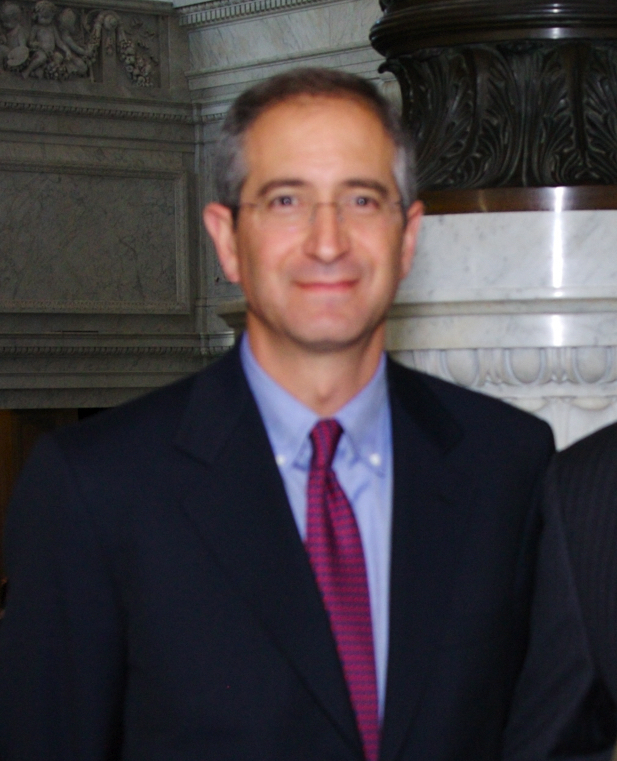
Brian L. Roberts, CEO of Comcast

- David L. Cohen – Executive Vice President of Comcast, Chief of Staff of Philadelphia Mayor Ed Rendell.
- Adam Gimbel (1817–1896) – Founder of the Gimbel Brothers Company.
- Bernard Gimbel (1885–1966) – President of the Gimbels department store.
- Ralph J. Roberts (1920–2015) – Founder of Comcast.
- Brian L. Roberts – CEO of Comcast.

=== Clergy ===
- Henry Berkowitz (1857–1924) – Rabbi, helped establish the Federation of Jewish Philanthropies and the Philadelphia Rabbinical Association in 1901.
- Jacob Raphael Cohen (1738–1811) – Rabbi of Congregation Mikveh Israel in Philadelphia from 1784 until his death in 1811.
- Emanuel Nunes Carvalho (1771–1817) – Religious leader and lexicographer. Published the first Jewish sermon printed in the United States.
- Amy Eilberg (1954–) – First female rabbi ordained in Conservative Judaism.
- Linda Joy Holtzman – Rabbi and author.
- Marcus Jastrow (1829–1903) – Talmudic scholar, author of A Dictionary of the Targumim, Talmud Babli, Talmud Yerushalmi and Midrashic Literature.
- Joseph Krauskopf (1858–1923) – Rabbi, author, leader of Reform Judaism and founder of the National Farm School.
- Isaac Leeser (1806–1868) – Publisher, helped found the Jewish press of America and produced the first Jewish translation of the Bible into English.
- J. Leonard Levy (1865–1917) – Rabbi
- Gershom Mendes Seixas (1745–1816) – First native-born Jewish religious leader in the United States.
- Henry Samuel Morais (1860–1935) – Writer and Rabbi.
- Sabato Morais (1823–1897) – Italian-American rabbi, leader of Mikveh Israel Synagogue and pioneer of Italian Jewish Studies in America.
- Henry Vidaver (1833–1882) – Rabbi of Congregation Rodeph Shalom in Philadelphia from 1859 to 1861.

=== Literature ===
- Mary Matilda Cohen (1854–1911) – Journalist
- Nina Morais Cohen (1855–1918) – Author and suffragist.
- Rebecca Gratz (1781–1869) – Educator and philanthropist.
- Abraham Hart (1810–1885) – Publisher, philanthropist, briefly president of the Jewish Congregation Mickvéh Israel.
- A. B. Magil (1905–2003) – Marxist journalist and pamphleteer.
- Mordecai Manuel Noah (1785–1851) – Sheriff, playwright, diplomat, journalist and utopian.
- Moses Polock (1817–1903) – First dealer in the United States who dealt exclusively in rare books. At his death he was the oldest bibliophile in the country.
- A. S. W. Rosenbach (1876–1952) – American collector, scholar, and seller of rare books and manuscripts.

=== Medicine ===
- Isaac Hays (1796–1879) – Ophthalmologist, founding member of the American Medical Association, first president of the Philadelphia Ophthalmological Society.
- Solomon Solis-Cohen (1857–1948) – Physician, professor of medicine and prominent Zionist.

=== Military ===
- David Franks (1740–1793) – An aide-de-camp for General Benedict Arnold during the American War of Independence.
- Uriah P. Levy (1792–1862) – Naval officer, real estate investor, philanthropist.
- Joseph George Rosengarten (1835–1921) – Lawyer, historian and Civil War veteran.
- Haym Salomon (1740–1785) – Businessman, prime financier during the American Revolutionary War.

=== Law ===
- Mayer Sulzberger (1843–1923) – Judge, newspaper publisher.
- Moses Levy (1757–1826) – Lawyer, trustee of the University of Pennsylvania for twenty-four years.
- Samson Levy (1761–1831) – Lawyer, one of the incorporators of the Pennsylvania Academy of the Fine Arts.

=== Politics ===
- Isaac Bacharach (1870–1956) – Politician from New Jersey who represented the 2nd congressional district from 1915 to 1937.
- David Cohen (1914–2005) – Lawyer and Philadelphia City Council member for 26 years.
- Rose Gratz Fishstein (1895–?) – Suffragist jailed for protesting in front of the White House.
- Benjamin M. Golder (1891–1946) – Member of the United States House of Representatives for Pennsylvania from 1925 to 1933.
- Sam Katz – Three-time candidate for Mayor of Philadelphia, subject of 2006 documentary film The Shame of a City.
- Mark Levin – Attorney, Reagan administration official, talk radio host.
- Lewis Charles Levin (1808–1860) – Served three terms in the U.S. House of Representatives for Pennsylvania. Considered first Jewish congressman.
- Leonard Myers (1827–1905) – Member of the U.S. House of Representatives for Pennsylvania during the American Civil War.
- Henry Myer Phillips (1811–1884) – Member of the U.S. House of Representatives for Pennsylvania from 1856 to 1860.
- Ed Rendell – Mayor of Philadelphia from 1992 to 2000. Governor of Pennsylvania from 2003 to 2011.
- Bernard Samuel (1880–1954) – Mayor of Philadelphia from 1941 to 1952. Born to Jewish parents, but converted to the Episcopalian faith as a young man.
- Arlen Specter (1930–2012) – District Attorney of Philadelphia from 1966 to 1974. United States Senator for Pennsylvania from 1981 to 2011.
- Josh Shapiro (1973–) – Governor of Pennsylvania (2023–), Former Pennsylvania Attorney General from 2017–2023.
- Joan Specter (1934–) – City Council Member (1980–1996).

=== Philanthropy ===
- Rebecca Machado Phillips (1746–1831) – Founder and director of early Philadelphia charitable organizations.

=== Sports ===
- Howard Eskin (1951–) – sports talk radio personality on 94WIP.
- Howie Roseman (1975–) – Philadelphia Eagles Executive Vice President

=== Media ===
- David Corenswet – actor
- Lil Dicky – rapper
- Seth Green – actor
- Jack Klugman (1922–2012) – actor
- Man Ray (1890–1976) – artist
- Bob Saget (1956–2022) – actor and comedian
- Jake Tapper – television journalist

== Cultural activity ==
=== Books ===
The earliest publication relating to the Jews published in Philadelphia was a sermon by Moses Mendelssohn delivered by his preceptor David Hirchel Frankel, and translated from the German. It was printed from the press of Andrew Stewart in 1763. The first Hebrew Bible that appeared in the United States was published in Philadelphia in 1814 by Thomas Dobson, the printer being William Fry.

=== Newspapers ===
The Occident and American Jewish Advocate was the first Jewish newspaper published in Philadelphia, founded Isaac Leeser in 1843. It was edited by him it until his death in 1868 and for one year thereafter by Mayer Sulzberger. The paper went defunct in 1869. Other now defunct newspapers include The Jewish Index (1872-1873) and The Jewish Record (1875-1886), published under the editorship of Alfred T. Jones. There were several daily papers published in Yiddish in the past, with the most notable being the Jewish Evening Post.

The Jewish Exponent was first published on April 15, 1887 and currently serves as the city's sole Jewish newspaper. It is the second oldest Jewish newspaper published today in the United States.

=== Jewish Federation ===
From a period immediately after the Revolutionary war efforts have been made to collect money for the charitable organizations by appealing to the general public. Lotteries were held early in the 19th century; subscription lists were constantly being formed. A ball was given in 1843 in aid of three societies. In 1853 and in 1854 dinners were given in aid of the Hebrew Charitable Fund, at which many noted citizens were present. The year following, a ball was given instead of a dinner, and it proved such a success financially that it was thought expedient to continue this form of entertainment; the Hebrew Charity-Ball Association was formed in consequence of this determination, and annual balls were given with great success until 1901, when they were discontinued owing to the establishment of the Federation of Jewish Charities. As of 2019, The Jewish Federation of Greater Philadelphia (JFGP) has its headquarters in the Jewish Community Services Building in Center City, Philadelphia.

=== United Hebrew Charities ===
The United Hebrew Charities, a union of six institutions, was organized in 1869, with Simon W. Arnold as its first president. Max Herzberg is president. The combination of the principal charitable societies of Philadelphia was formed on March 17, 1901; Jacob Gimbel was its first president. The federation as originally formed embraced nine institutions—the Jewish Hospital Association, Jewish Foster Home, Society of United Hebrew Charities, Hebrew Education Society, Orphans' Guardians, Jewish Maternity Association, Jewish Immigration Society, Young Women's Union, and Hebrew Sunday-School Society. Later, the National Farm School, the National Jewish Hospital for Consumptives (at Denver), and the Alliance Israélite Universelle became beneficiaries. The income of the Federation (1903) was $123,039, with a membership of 1,916.

In 1901, Lewis Elkin bequeathed $2,000,000 (today $77,400,000) to the city of Philadelphia for the support of superannuated female school-teachers. This is the largest bequest for a charitable object yet made by a Jewish resident of the city. Simon Muhr among other benefactions left a bequest for general educational purposes. The Simon Muhr Work Training School, built in 1899, was added to the National Register of Historic Places in 1986.

=== Association of Jewish Immigrants ===
In 1882, the great exodus from Russia took place; thousands of Jews forced to emigrate took up their residence in Philadelphia; at the present time they constitute a majority of the Jewish population. A society for the protection of immigrants arriving from the Slavonic provinces was organized October 5, 1884, and called the "Association of Jewish Immigrants"; Louis E. Levy was president. In 1903, 5,310 Jewish immigrants arrived at the port of Philadelphia. In general, they quickly became prosperous; many had entered the learned professions, and they built synagogues and hospitals in the southern portion of the city, where most of them resided. They had many synagogues and ḥebras, the most important being the Congregation B'nai Abraham, founded in 1882; Bernard L. Levinthal was rabbi of this and the associated congregations in 1904.

=== Young Men's Hebrew Association ===
The Young Men's Hebrew Association, an outgrowth of a former institution—the Hebrew Association—was organized May 12, 1875, with Mayer Sulzberger as president. The object of the association is "to promote a higher culture among young men"; its membership in 1904 numbered over 1,000, under the presidency of Adolph Eichholz. Its building is situated in North Broad street. The Young Women's Union was originally a branch of the Hebrew Education Society, and was organized through the efforts of Mrs. Fanny Binswanger Hoffman on February 5, 1885; the object of the union is to educate the younger children of immigrant Jews. It maintained a kindergarten, day-nursery, sewing-school, etc. Mrs. Julia Friedberger Eschner was president.

=== Social Clubs ===
There are several Jewish social organizations. The Mercantile Club was established November 10, 1853, and incorporated April 17, 1869. Louis Bomeisler was its first president. The club occupies a building in North Broad street; Clarence Wolf was its president in 1904. The Garrick, the Progress, and the Franklin are other Jewish clubs. The Golden Slipper Club was founded in the early 1920s by a group of Jewish Masons who formed a card club and used the winnings to support families in need of basic necessities such as milk and coal. Golden Slipper Club and Charities exists in 2020 to perform philanthropic work through its Camp, Gems for seniors, and Club for people in the region who share its values of Charity, Good Fellowship & Loyalty. Golden Slipper will celebrate 100 years of service to the Philadelphia region in 2022.

=== Jewish Publication Society ===
The original Jewish Publication Society was established in Philadelphia November 9, 1845, Abraham Hart being its first president. The society owed its existence to Isaac Leeser. It published eleven works, including two by Grace Aguilar. The present Jewish Publication Society of America, a national organization, with headquarters at Philadelphia, was formed June 3, 1888; Morris Newburger was its first president. The society has published many works of value, including Israel Zangwill's Children of the Ghetto; a new translation of the Bible was started in the early 20th century, the Book of Psalms having already been issued by 1904. In 1904, Mayer Sulzberger was chairman of the publication committee; Edwin Wolf was president.

=== Museums and Art Galleries ===
The National Museum of American Jewish History, a Smithsonian affiliated museum, was founded in 1976. The Philadelphia Museum of Jewish Art, founded in 1975, exhibits contemporary art that illuminates the Jewish experience. The Old City Jewish Arts Center, a gallery created in 2005, explores Judaism through the language of the arts.

== See also ==
- Jewish American
- Jewish history in the United States (pre-20th century)
- Jewish history in Pennsylvania
- List of Jewish Americans
- Religion in Philadelphia
