= DeSean Jackson =

American football player and coach (born 1986)

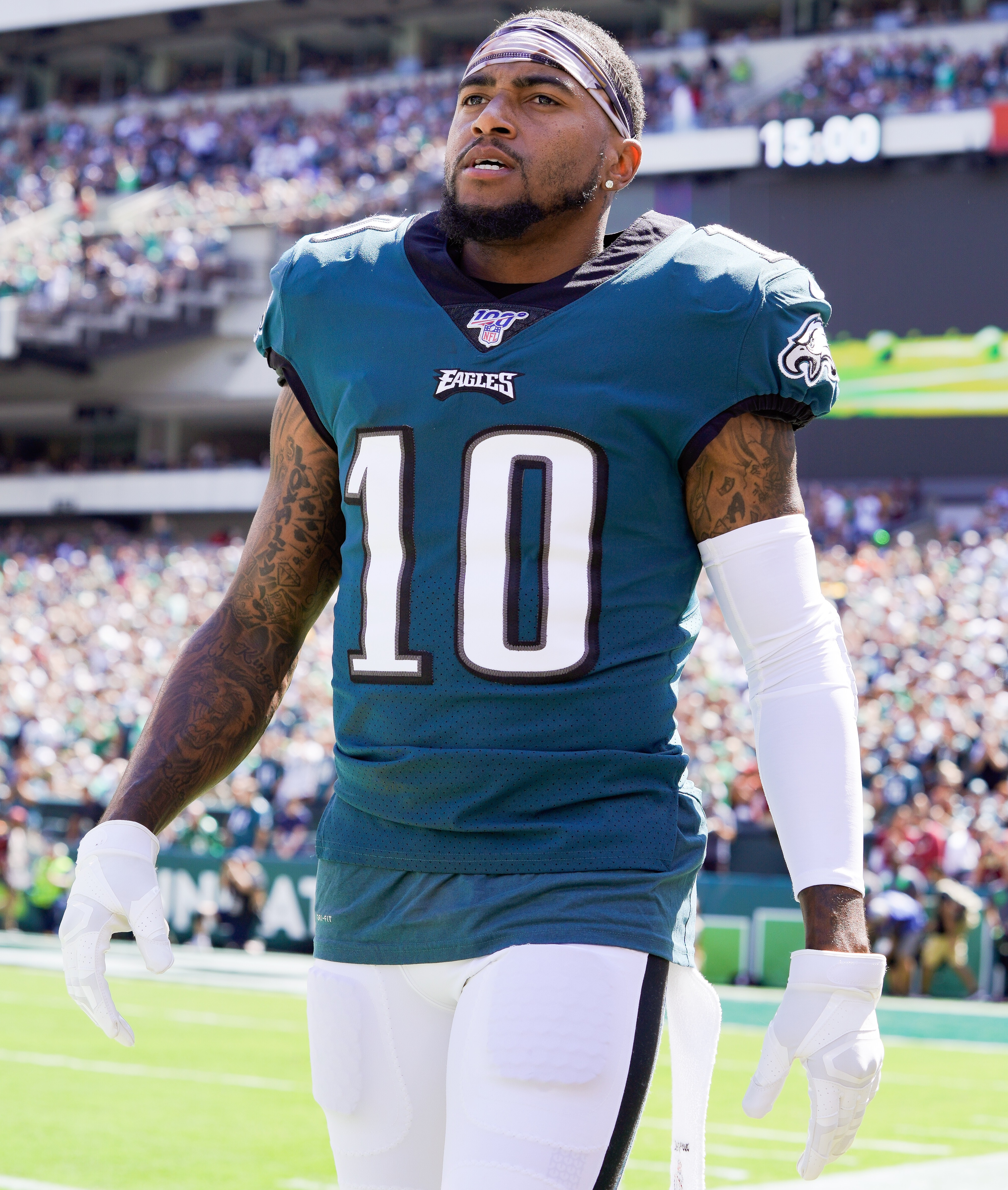
- Jackson with the Philadelphia Eagles in 2019

Delaware State Hornets
- Title: Head coach

Personal information
- Born: December 1, 1986 (age 39); Los Angeles, California, U.S.
- Listed height: 5 ft 10 in (1.78 m)
- Listed weight: 175 lb (79 kg)

Career information
- Position: Wide receiver (No. 10, 11, 1, 15)
- High school: Long Beach Polytechnic (Long Beach, California)
- College: California (2005–2007)
- NFL draft: 2008: 2nd round, 49th overall pick

Career history

Playing
- Philadelphia Eagles (2008–2013); Washington Redskins (2014–2016); Tampa Bay Buccaneers (2017–2018); Philadelphia Eagles (2019–2020); Los Angeles Rams (2021); Las Vegas Raiders (2021); Baltimore Ravens (2022)

Coaching
- Woodrow Wilson HS (CA) (2024) Offensive coordinator; Delaware State (2025–present) Head coach

Awards and highlights
- Second-team All-Pro (2009) (Note: Selected as a kick returner); 3× Pro Bowl (2009, 2010, 2013); PFWA All-Rookie Team (2008); Consensus All-American (2006); First-team All-American (2007); First-team All-Pac-10 (2006); Second-team All-Pac-10 (2007); NFL records: Most career touchdowns of 60+ yards: 26; Most career touchdowns of 80+ yards: 5 (tied)

Career NFL statistics
- Receptions: 641
- Receiving yards: 11,263
- Receiving touchdowns: 58
- Return yards: 1,352
- Return touchdowns: 4
- Stats at Pro Football Reference

Head coaching record
- Career: NCAA: 11–7 (.611)

DeSean William Jackson (born December 1, 1986) is an American college football coach and former player who is the head football coach at Delaware State University. Known for his speed, he is recognized as one of the best deep threats in NFL history. He played college football as a wide receiver for the California Golden Bears, where he was recognized as a two-time, first-team All-American in 2006 and 2007. He was selected by the Philadelphia Eagles in the second round of the 2008 NFL draft, and also played for the Washington Redskins, Tampa Bay Buccaneers, Los Angeles Rams, and Baltimore Ravens. Jackson was selected to the Pro Bowl three times, and was the first player selected to the Pro Bowl at two different positions in the same year when he was named to the 2010 Pro Bowl as a wide receiver and return specialist. After retiring as a player, Jackson pursued a coaching career. Near the end of the 2024 season, Jackson was named the head football coach at Delaware State.

== Early life ==
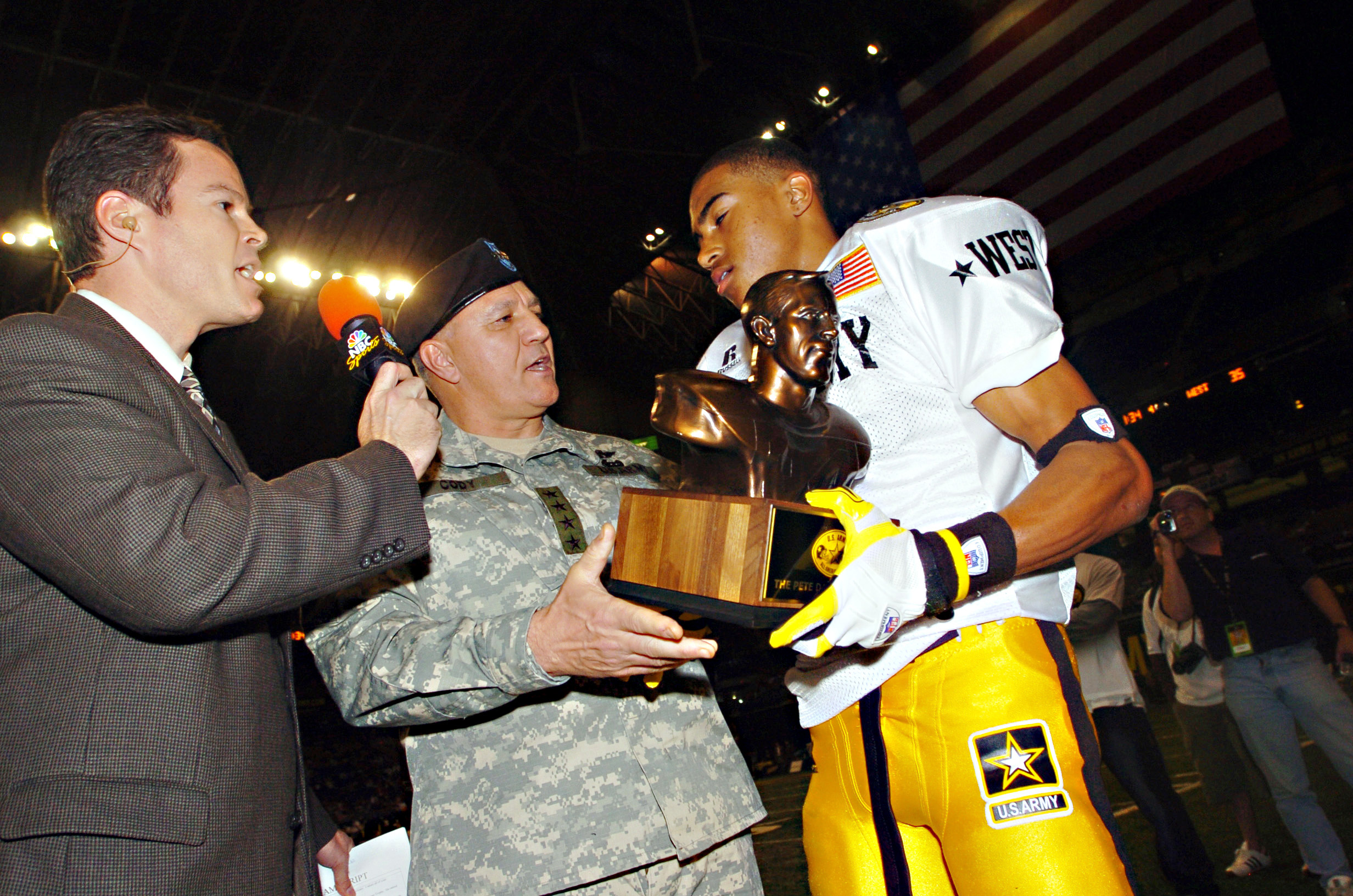
Jackson receiving the 2005 Pete Dawkins MVP trophy after the U.S. Army All-American Bowl

Jackson was born in Los Angeles, and grew up in the Crenshaw neighborhood of Los Angeles of the city. Jackson is the son of Bill and Gayle Jackson, and his oldest brother, Byron, is a former San Jose State wide receiver who spent two seasons on the Kansas City Chiefs' practice squad. His father was hospitalized with pancreatic cancer during the Eagles run in the 2009 playoffs, and passed away on May 14, 2009. He attended Long Beach Polytechnic High School, the same high school as future Philadelphia Eagles teammate Winston Justice and many other current NFL players. He became one of the top wide receiver recruits in the nation, with many collegiate football programs pursuing his services. He was named the 2004 Glenn Davis Award winner by the Los Angeles Times as Southern California's player of the year. He also ran track and played baseball and was scouted by both the Tampa Bay Rays and Philadelphia Phillies in his senior year. In track, he was timed at 10.5 seconds in the 100 meters.

Jackson caught 60 passes for 1,075 yards for 15 touchdowns his senior year, leading the Jackrabbits to a CIF Southern Section championship. He was pressed into service last minute as a defensive back in the section title game against Los Alamitos High School, responding with two interceptions, one which he returned 68 yards for a touchdown to help fuel Long Beach Poly's 21–6 victory.

To cap off his high school career, Jackson was voted the Most Valuable Player at the U.S. Army All-American Bowl in San Antonio, where he caught seven passes for 141 yards and passed for a 45-yard touchdown in leading the West to a 35–3 victory in a game that featured 80 of the nation's top players. However, he was also involved in an embarrassing play when he attempted to somersault from the five-yard line for a touchdown, but landed on the one-yard line, leaving the football there. ESPN.com's Tom Lemming rated him as the number four wide receiver in the country, PrepStar Magazine named him an All-American and a member of its Dream Team Top 100 players, and Calhisports.com voted him the 2004 Mr. Football State Player of the Year. He committed to the football program at the University of California, Berkeley under Coach Jeff Tedford, making his announcement on Southern California's FSN West. Jackson waited until the deadline to choose between scholarship offers for California and the University of Southern California.

== College career ==
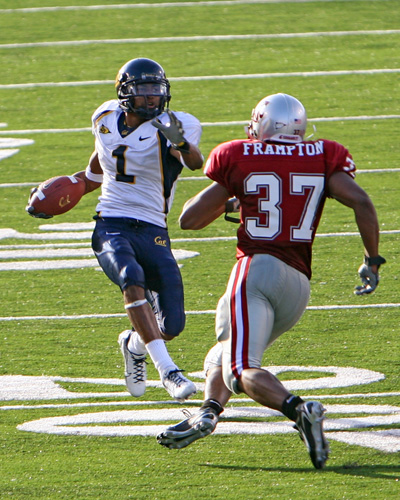
Jackson in 2006 matched against Washington State strong safety Eric Frampton

Jackson attended the University of California, Berkeley, where he played for the California Golden Bears football team from 2005 to 2007. Wearing the number 1, in his first collegiate game against Sacramento State in 2005, he scored both an offensive and special teams touchdown, returning a punt 49 yards for a score. Throughout his freshman season, Jackson picked up 38 receptions for 601 yards along with seven touchdowns, eclipsing the 100-yard mark three times. In the 2005 Las Vegas Bowl game against BYU, Jackson tallied 130 yards and two scores. Jackson was also expected to play for Cal's baseball team but, due to the success of his freshman football season, he chose to focus exclusively on football.

Coming into his sophomore year with high expectations, Jackson displayed more of his talent and playmaking ability, tallying 1,060 receiving yards and nine touchdowns. Jackson also returned four punts for touchdowns. He earned first-team All-Pac-10 honors as both a punt returner and a wide receiver. Jackson garnered national recognition with selections to first-team All-America by the Associated Press, Walter Camp Football Foundation, the Football Writers Association of America, the Sporting News, and Rivals.com as a punt returner. Jackson also captured the inaugural Randy Moss Award as the top returner in the nation. In one of only two California losses in Pac-10 play, Jackson had a 95-yard punt return for a touchdown against Arizona.

Jackson entered his junior season being considered a Heisman Trophy candidate. His season began promisingly, with a 77-yard punt return for a touchdown against Tennessee in the opening game of the season. Against eleventh-ranked Oregon, he caught 11 passes for 161 yards and two touchdowns to lead the Bears to their first victory in Autzen Stadium since 1987. Jackson finished the 2007 season with 65 catches for 762 yards and six touchdowns as a receiver, and an NCAA-leading four punts returned for a touchdown. Jackson was named an All-American as a return specialist. Jackson suffered several minor injuries that limited his effectiveness at times during the season, along with a right thigh injury that forced him to miss most of the game against Washington and the Big Game against Stanford. He also missed the first quarter of the 2007 Armed Forces Bowl for violating undisclosed team rules.

Jackson left Cal following the 2007 season and declared for the 2008 NFL draft. He departed holding Pac-10 records for punts returned for a touchdown both in a season (four) and in a career (six). Jackson ranks third all-time at California for receiving yards with 2,423 and receiving touchdowns with 22. He is sixth in receptions (162). Jackson finished with 52 career plays of 20 yards or more, making up 23 percent of his 226 touches.

In June 2025, Jackson was named one of the 79 nominees for the 2026 class of the College Football Hall of Fame.

== Professional career ==
=== Pre-draft ===
Pre-draft measurables
Height	Weight	Arm length	Hand span	40-yard dash	10-yard split	20-yard split	20-yard shuttle	Three-cone drill	Vertical jump	Broad jump
5 ft 9 3/4 in (1.77 m)	169 lb (77 kg)	29 3/4 in (0.76 m)	9 3/8 in (0.24 m)	4.35 s	1.55 s	2.53 s	4.19 s	6.82 s	34.5 in (0.88 m)	10 ft 2 in (3.10 m)
Measurables and 40-yard dash from 2008 NFL Combine; all other values from Pro Day workout

Going to the 2008 NFL draft, Jackson was considered one of the top 10 wide receivers available in a draft class with many talented wide outs. The only knock on Jackson was his small frame, being measured at 5'9¾ " and just over 170 pounds. During the pre-draft period, Hall of Fame wide receiver Jerry Rice was quoted saying that Jackson "has all the talent in the world. There's no reason he can't be everything he wants to be at the next level." At the 2008 NFL Combine, Jackson had an impressive showing, running an official 4.35 40-yard dash. He performed well in positional drills, running routes fluidly, and catching passes very well displaying his well-known agility and quickness. He also posted a standing broad jump of 10 feet.

=== Philadelphia Eagles (first stint) ===
==== 2008 season ====
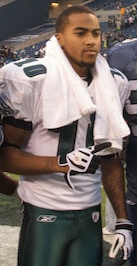
Jackson with the Philadelphia Eagles in 2008

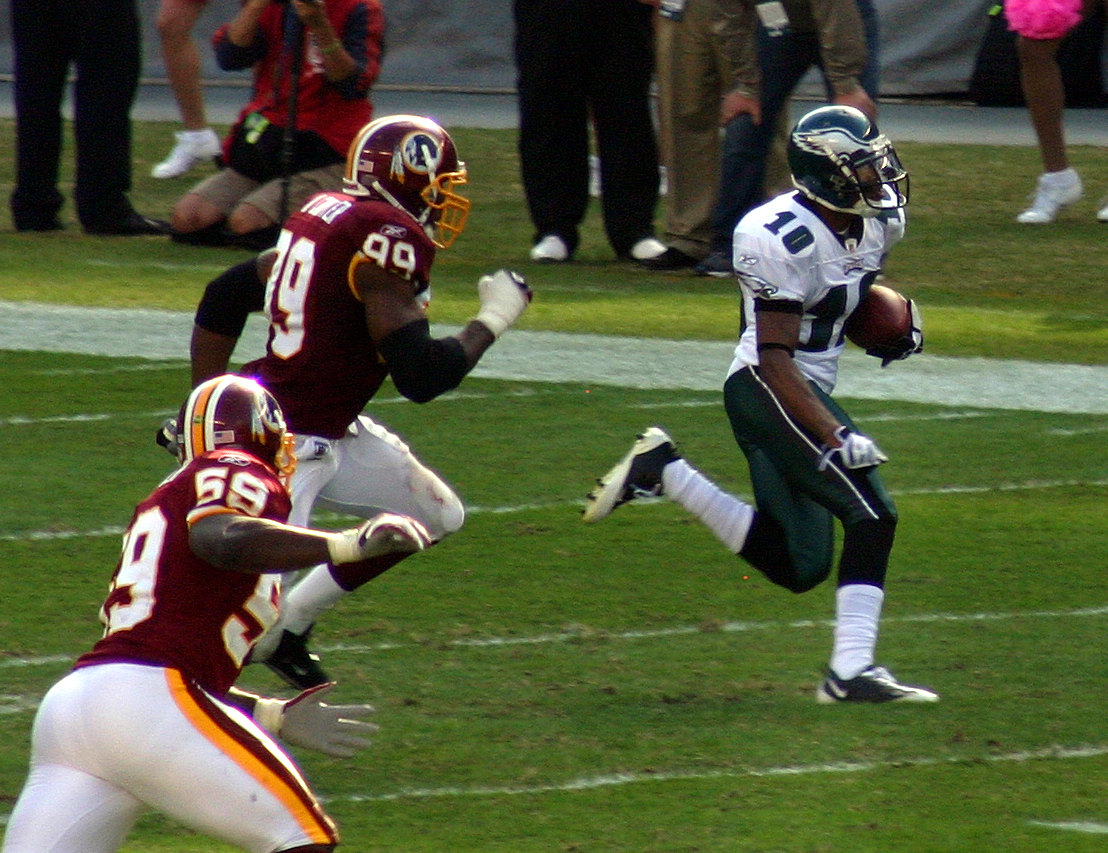
Jackson with the Eagles during a 2008 game against the Washington Redskins

On April 26, 2008, Jackson was selected in the second round (49th overall) of the 2008 NFL draft by the Philadelphia Eagles. He was the seventh wide receiver taken, the first time no wide receivers were drafted in the first round. On July 20, he agreed to terms on a four-year contract with the team.

Jackson had a good preseason performance, which included a 76-yard punt return for a touchdown against the New England Patriots in the third preseason game. After the Eagles' roster was cut to its maximum 53-man limit for the season, he was listed as the starting punt returner and as a second-string wide receiver.

Due to injuries sustained by Kevin Curtis and Reggie Brown, Jackson was the first rookie to start opening day for head coach Andy Reid. On September 7, Jackson collected six catches for 106 yards in a 38–3 win over the St. Louis Rams. He also returned eight punts for a total of 97 yards, including a 60-yard punt return to set up a field goal. He had over 200 all-purpose yards, a record for a rookie wide receiver. During a Monday Night Football game against the Dallas Cowboys on September 15, Jackson celebrated prematurely before running into the end zone by flipping the football behind him at the one-yard line. This led to what would have otherwise been his first NFL touchdown to be challenged and overturned, with Brian Westbrook running in for a touchdown from the one-yard line on the next play. The Eagles lost the game to Dallas 41–37. Jackson finished the game with 110 yards on six receptions, becoming the only receiver in NFL history to have over 100 yards receiving in each of his first two games besides the Eagles' Don Looney in 1940.

On September 28, Jackson recorded his first offensive touchdown against the Chicago Bears. During this game, he also fumbled a punt return that set up the Bears' go ahead score. The following week against the Washington Redskins on October 5, Jackson returned his first punt return for a touchdown 68 yards. Jackson scored his first rushing touchdown on November 9 on a direct snap in the wildcat formation with a nine-yard run against the New York Giants. A rematch against the Giants on December 7 which resulted in a 20–14 upset of the defending Super Bowl champions marked the first time in the season that Jackson did not have a reception. The following week, Jackson rebounded, recording 77 yards on five catches in a 30–10 victory over the Cleveland Browns. In the playoffs, Jackson recorded just 1 catch for 34 yards in the Eagles' wildcard victory over Minnesota, and four catches for 81 yards in a win over the New York Giants. Jackson's final touchdown of the season came in the NFC Championship game on January 18, 2009, against the Arizona Cardinals, when he managed to haul in a 62-yard touchdown to cap a six-catch, 92-yard game. Jackson narrowly finished second to Curtis in postseason receiving yards with 207 to Curtis's 211.

Jackson finished a successful rookie season with two receiving touchdowns and a team-leading 62 receptions (the most by an Eagles rookie wide-receiver, second only to tight end Keith Jackson's 81 in 1988, and joining Jackson and Don Looney as the only Eagles to lead the team in receptions their rookie seasons). His 912 receiving yards surpassed Keith Jackson's rookie record of 869. He also led the NFL with 50 punt returns (an Eagles' rookie record and 3rd all time) for 440 yards (third in the NFL, fifth ever by an Eagle, and an Eagles' rookie record).

==== 2009 season ====
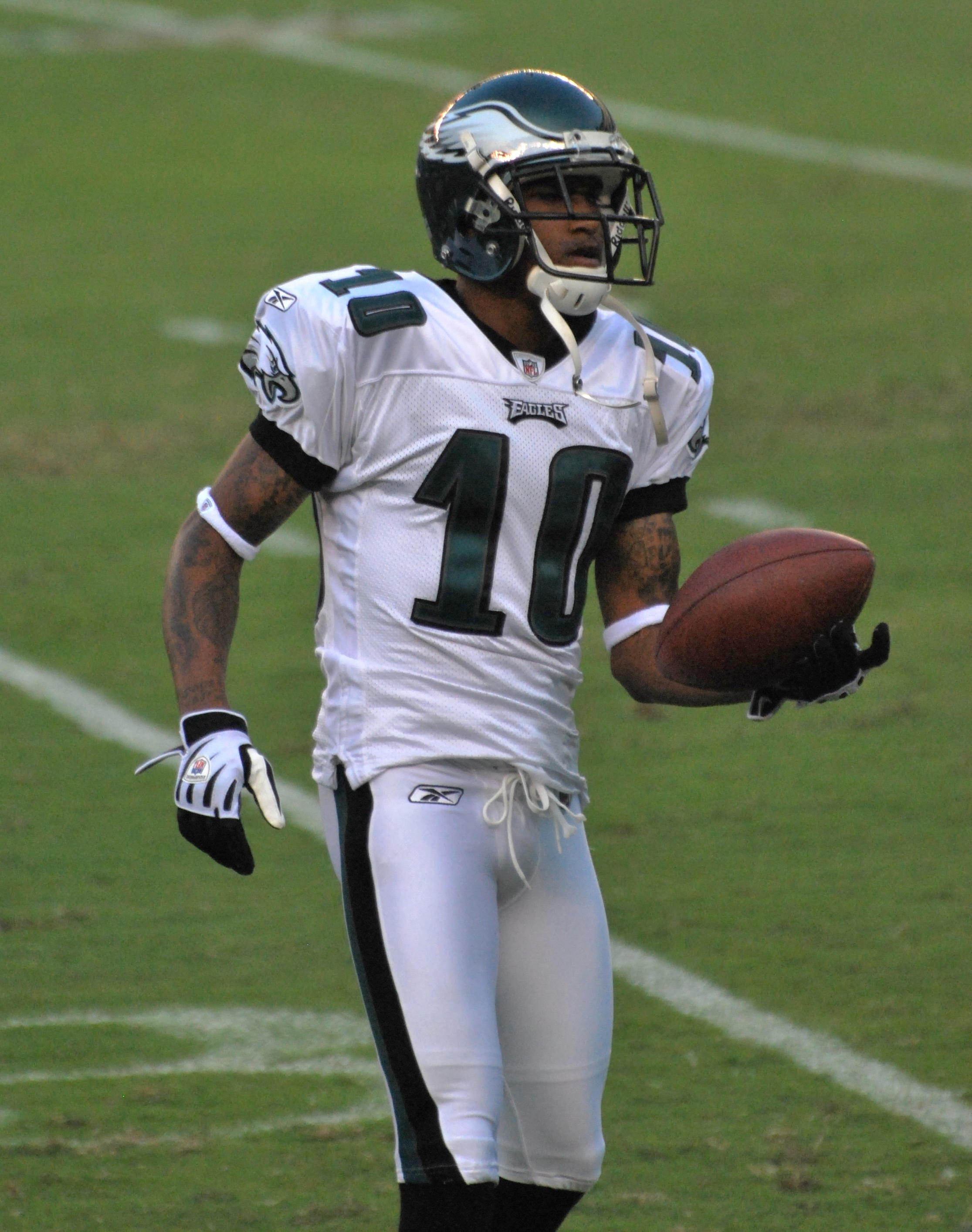
Jackson with the Eagles in 2009

In Week 1 against the Carolina Panthers, Jackson had his second punt return for an 85-yard touchdown, the second longest in Eagles history. The following week, Kevin Kolb threw his first career touchdown pass to Jackson against the New Orleans Saints for 71 yards. Jackson had 149 receiving yards against the Kansas City Chiefs on September 27 which included a 64-yard touchdown reception. Against the Oakland Raiders on October 17 he caught six receptions for 94 yards, including a 51-yard diving fingertips catch, in a 13–9 loss.

Jackson caught a 57-yard touchdown pass from Donovan McNabb that gave McNabb his 200th career touchdown and 30,000th career passing yards on October 26 against the Washington Redskins on Monday Night Football. He also scored his first rushing touchdown of the season on a 67-yard reverse. Jackson injured his right foot during the game and had an x-ray during halftime, but returned to play during the third quarter. He was later named the NFC Offensive Player of the Week for his efforts.

In a Week 11 matchup on Sunday Night Football against the Chicago Bears, Jackson caught eight passes for 107 yards and a touchdown as the Eagles won a close game, 24–20. On November 29 against the Redskins, Jackson had to leave the game after sustaining a concussion after a helmet-to-helmet hit by linebacker London Fletcher. Jackson recorded two receptions, including a 35-yard touchdown. Jackson missed the next game due to his concussion, but returned on December 13 against the New York Giants. Jackson had a career day, as he caught six passes for 178 yards including a 60-yard touchdown pass from McNabb and a 72-yard punt return for a touchdown (combined for 261 all purpose yards). The game would also put him at eight touchdowns of over 50 yards in a single season, tying an NFL record shared only by Elroy "Crazylegs" Hirsch and Devin Hester. For his performance against the Giants, Jackson was named NFC Special Teams Player of the Week.

The following week against the San Francisco 49ers, Jackson went over the 1,000-yard mark for the season with 140 receiving yards, including a 19-yard touchdown reception as the Eagles clinched a playoff berth. On December 27, he had four catches for 33 yards and a two-yard touchdown, his shortest touchdown of the season, in a win against the Denver Broncos.

Jackson was nearly shut down by the Dallas Cowboys in the regular season finale, with only two passes for 36 yards in a 24–0 rout of the Eagles. In a rematch the following week on January 3, 2010, against the Cowboys in the NFC Wild Card Game, he was held by Dallas to three catches for 14 yards, including a six-yard touchdown pass in the 34–14 loss.

Jackson ended the season as the Eagles' leading receiver with 1,167 yards. He was selected to the 2010 Pro Bowl as a starting wide receiver and a kick returner, the first time in Pro Bowl history that a player was selected at two different positions. At the Pro Bowl, Jackson caught six passes for a team-high 101 yards and two touchdowns, including a 58-yard catch-and-run touchdown pass from McNabb. He was selected to the Sporting News' All-Pro team as a punt returner for the 2009 season, averaging 15.2 yards per punt return in 2009 as the league leader.

==== 2010 season ====
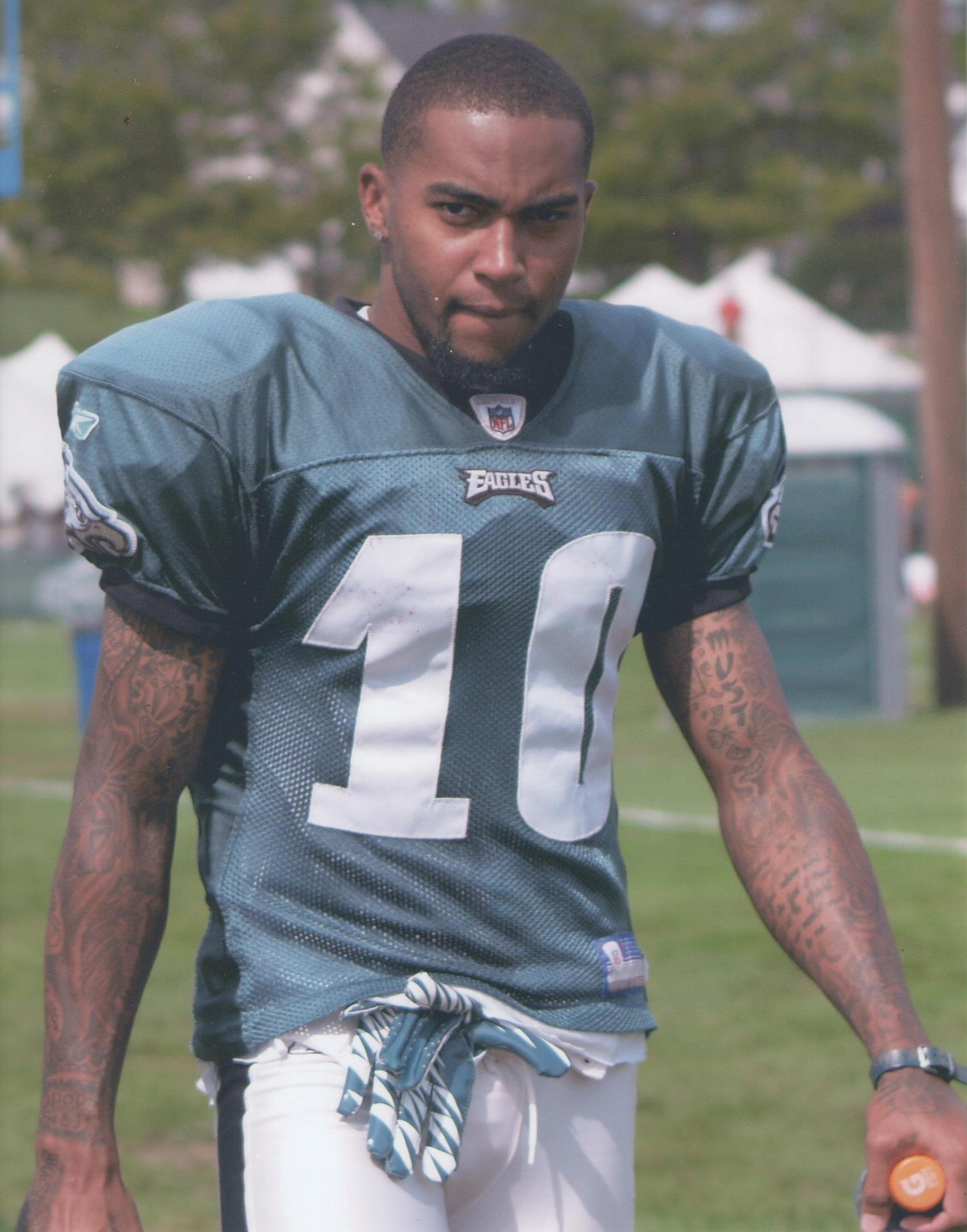
Jackson at the Eagles training camp in 2011

After skipping voluntary camp in the spring, Jackson reported to training camp earlier than most veterans. However, he was not speaking to the media and was said to be frustrated about how the Eagles were unwilling to negotiate a contract extension with him. Jackson was carted off the field after he suffered a back injury during the second full team workout of training camp on July 31, but the injury was not serious.

In a 35–32 victory over the Detroit Lions, Jackson had 135 receiving yards and a 45-yard catch-and-run touchdown pass. The following week against the Jacksonville Jaguars, Jackson caught a 61-yard touchdown and finished the game with five receptions for 153 yards. However, on October 3 and 10, Jackson caught only five passes for 43 total yards. He scored a pair of touchdowns on October 17 against the Atlanta Falcons, one on a 31-yard run and the second on a 34-yard reception from Kevin Kolb. During the game, he sustained a severe concussion after a collision with Atlanta cornerback Dunta Robinson, with both players assisted from the field. Jackson returned to play on November 7 against the Indianapolis Colts.

On November 15, after an altercation with LaRon Landry, Jackson caught a then career long 88-yard touchdown pass from Michael Vick on the first play from scrimmage while Landry was covering him in 59–28 a Monday Night Football victory against the Washington Redskins. He surpassed this on December 12 when he had a 91-yard touchdown against the Dallas Cowboys and also finished the game with a personal best 210 receiving yards. Jackson again ended the regular season as the team's leading receiver with 1,056 yards. He was ranked 29th by his fellow players on the NFL Top 100 Players of 2011.

===== Miracle at the New Meadowlands =====
On December 19, 2010, Jackson returned a punt 65 yards for a touchdown to lead the Eagles to a win against the New York Giants in the final 14 seconds of the game. The Eagles had trailed 31–10 with under eight minutes to play but had come back with three unanswered touchdowns. With 14 seconds left, the game was tied at 31–31 and Jackson received the punt. He fumbled at first, but then picked it up and ran 65 yards for the score, running parallel to the goal line when he reached it in order to run out the clock. This punt return is the first and only game-winning punt return on the final play from scrimmage in the history of the NFL.

==== 2011 season ====
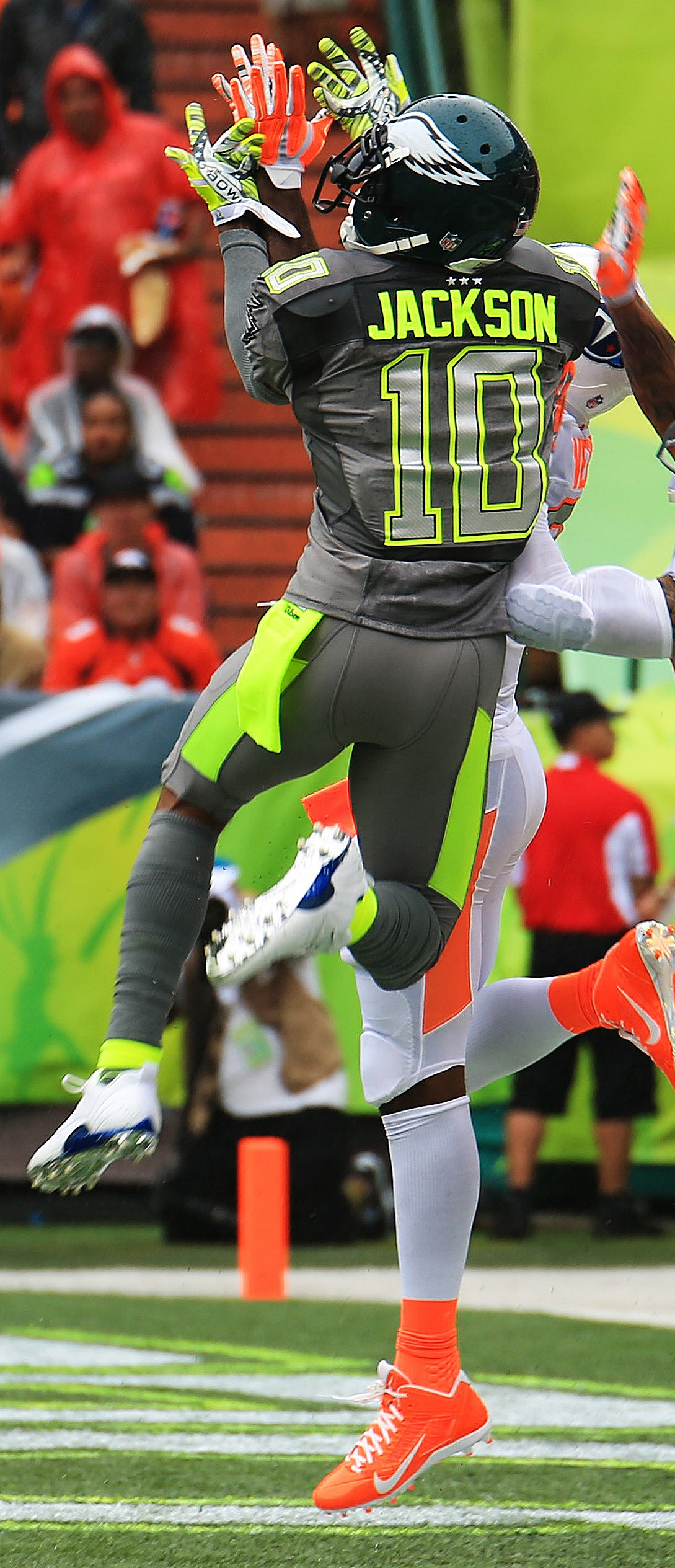
Jackson at the 2014 Pro Bowl

On July 28, 2011, Jackson failed to report to Eagles' training camp at Lehigh University in Bethlehem, Pennsylvania, as required in his contract. His agent, Drew Rosenhaus, offered no immediate explanation for his absence. Jackson faced fines of $30,000-a-day until he reported to camp. His deadline to report was August 9 or he would have lost a year of service time toward free agency. Jackson's holdout ended on August 8 when he reported to training camp. On November 13, in a game against the Arizona Cardinals, Jackson was deactivated for missing a special teams meeting. The following week in a matchup against the New York Giants, Jackson flipped the ball at New York defensive coordinator Perry Fewell after making a 50-yard reception and was flagged for taunting, drawing a $10,000 fine for unsportsmanlike conduct. In a November 27 loss to the New England Patriots, he was benched for the entire fourth quarter after a performance that included drops of two potential touchdown passes. Jackson ended the season as the Eagles' leading receiver with 961 yards. He also had the lowest total punt return yards of his career with 114 and did not return a punt for a touchdown during the 2011 season. He was ranked 71st by his fellow players on the NFL Top 100 Players of 2012.

==== 2012 season ====
Jackson received the Eagles' franchise tag on March 1, 2012. He was re-signed to a five-year contract worth up to $51 million on March 14. He had more than 100 yards receiving against Baltimore and New Orleans before fracturing his ribs in Week 12 against the Carolina Panthers. In 11 games, he had 45 receptions for 700 yards; his 77-yard touchdown catch against New Orleans was the longest by an Eagles player that season.

==== 2013 season ====
Jackson began the 2013 season with 104 yards against Washington, and followed this with a then-career-best nine receptions for 193 yards against San Diego. After a 132-yard game 5 (for which he won offensive player-of-the-week honors), he had his first career multiple-receiving-touchdown game against Tampa Bay. In week 14 against Minnesota, he again set a new career mark of 10 receptions for a career-second-best 195 yards. On the year, he led the team with 82 receptions for 1,332 yards (4th and 2nd most by an Eagle in a season). Though this was statistically the best season of his career, and led to his third Pro Bowl selection, Jackson was released by the Eagles on March 28, 2014. He left the Eagles with the franchise's 4th most receiving yards (6,117), 8th most receptions (356), 9th most receiving touchdowns (32), and tied for the 3rd most 100+ receiving-yard games (20). He was ranked 63rd by his fellow players on the NFL Top 100 Players of 2014.

=== Washington Redskins ===
==== 2014 season ====
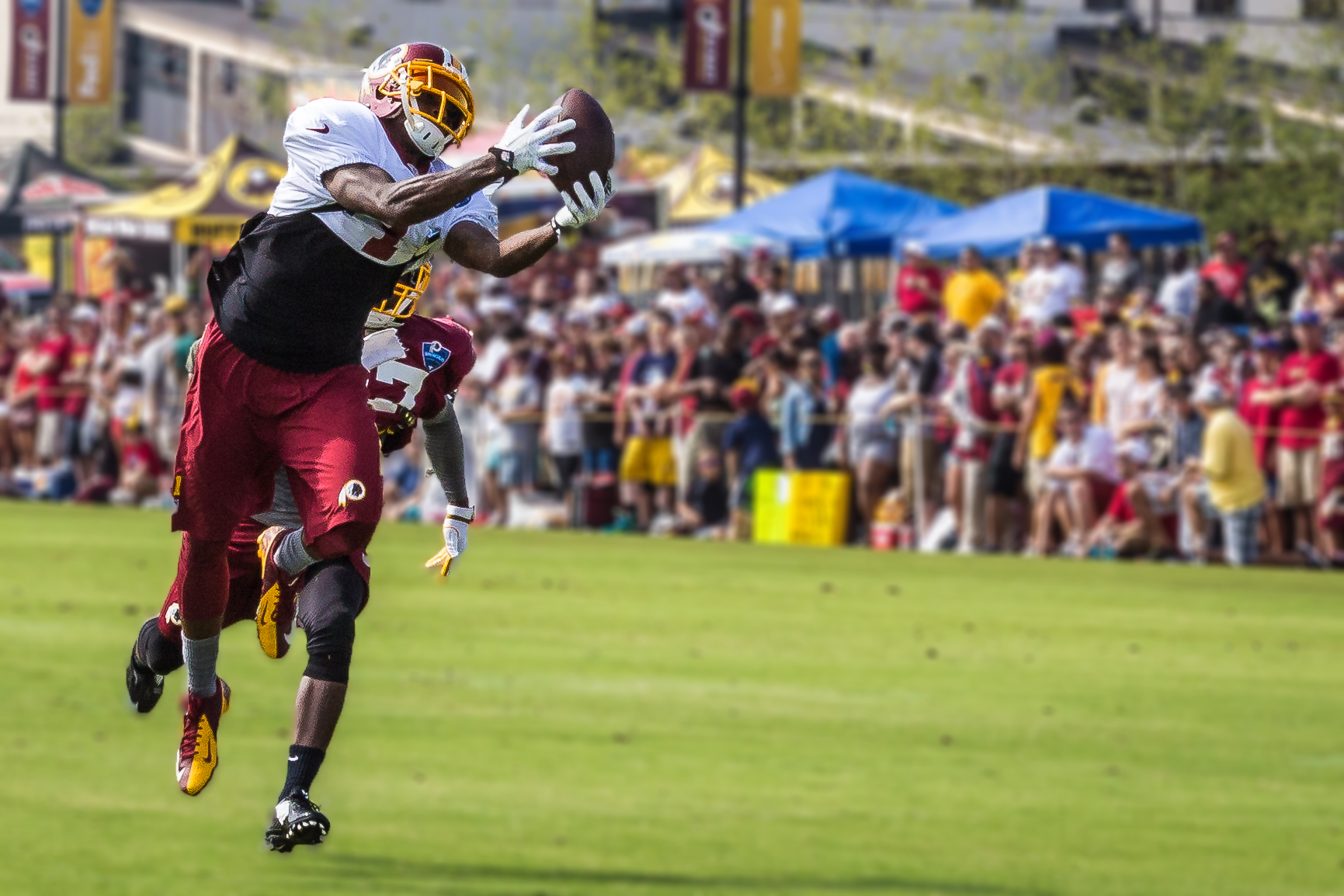
Jackson catching a pass at Washington Redskins training camp in 2014

On April 2, 2014, Jackson signed with the Washington Redskins to a reported three-year, $24 million contract with $16 million guaranteed.

On September 14, 2014, Jackson suffered a bruised left shoulder against the Jacksonville Jaguars and was forced to leave the game in the first half. Despite the injury, he would play the following week against Eagles in his return to Philadelphia, where he caught an 81-yard touchdown pass from quarterback Kirk Cousins. The jersey that Jackson wore in that game would be featured at the Pro Football Hall of Fame after he became the third player in NFL history to record an 80-yard touchdown both for and against a team. On October 17, 2014, Jackson was fined $16,537 for a horse-collar tackle on Arizona Cardinals safety Rashad Johnson in Week 6. Jackson broke 100-yards receiving in six games that season, and ended with 56 receptions for a team-leading 1,169 and six touchdowns, and led the NFL for the second time in his career with 20.9 yards per catch. He was ranked 50th by his fellow players on the NFL Top 100 Players of 2015.

==== 2015 season ====
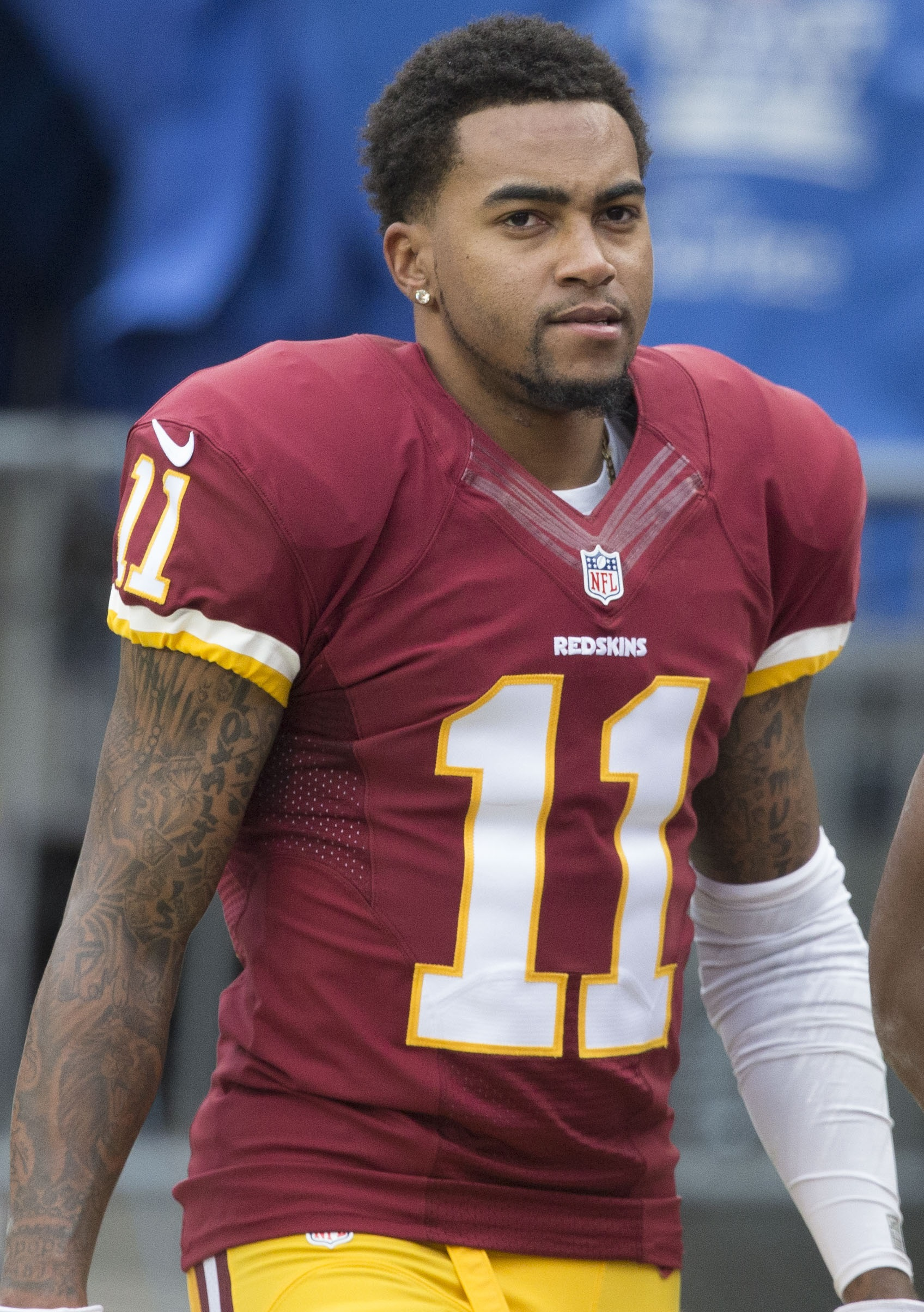
Jackson with the Redskins in 2014

On August 6, Jackson suffered a shoulder injury that kept him sidelined for most of pre-season training, and then injured a hamstring in the first quarter of the season opener against Miami. Jackson did not return until November 8, and even then saw limited duty over the remaining 10 games of the season. While injured, Jackson's home in Tarzana, California, was reportedly attacked and violently defended by guests while he was away. On December 20, Jackson caught a 77-yard touchdown pass from Cousins as part of his only 100 yard game of the season (6 catches for 153 yards). The next week, Jackson was booed by the Philadelphia crowd as he contributed to the Redskins' 38–24 division-clinching victory. He ended the season with 30 catches for 528 yards (career lows) and 4 touchdowns.

==== 2016 season ====
Jackson appeared to return to form with 6 catches for 102 yards in a season-opening loss to the Pittsburgh Steelers. He caught at least one pass in each of the 16 games that season, though production was lower during the season's middle. In Week 4, he was fined for wearing police caution tape on his shoes to protest the role of race in the American criminal justice system. He went over 100 yards in four-out-of-five games late in the season, including 3 catches for 102 yards, and a go-ahead 80-yard touchdown on December 11 against his former team in Philadelphia. Following a 7-reception, 111-yard effort the next week, Jackson was fined a second time in the season for the color of his cleats. Both he and teammate Pierre Garçon reached 1,000 yards receiving in a season-finale loss to the Giants, becoming the first Redskins tandem since 1999 to achieve this feat, and also becoming the 7th and 8th Redskins in history with multiple 1,000 yard receiving seasons. He ended the year with 56 receptions for 1,005 yards and 4 touchdowns, leading the NFL for the third time with 17.9 yards per catch.

=== Tampa Bay Buccaneers ===
==== 2017 season ====
On March 9, 2017, Jackson signed a three-year, $33.5 million contract with the Tampa Bay Buccaneers. On September 24, Jackson caught his first touchdown as a Buccaneer against the Minnesota Vikings. On October 5, Jackson caught five passes for 106 yards in a 19–14 loss against the New England Patriots. Overall, in the 2017 season, he recorded 50 receptions for 668 receiving yards and three receiving touchdowns.

==== 2018 season ====
On September 9, 2018, Jackson caught five passes for 146 yards and two touchdowns in the season-opening 48–40 win over defending NFC South champions New Orleans Saints. The performance was his second career game with two receiving touchdowns (58 and 36 yards), despite leaving the game with a concussion. His 58-yard touchdown reception was his 27th-career touchdown over 50 yards, which tied him for third most in NFL history, behind Randy Moss (29) and Jerry Rice (37). He also surpassed 100 yards in Week 2 against the Philadelphia Eagles (129 yards and a touchdown) and Week 4 against the Chicago Bears (112 yards), to enter Tampa Bay's bye-week seventh in the NFL in receiving yards and first in yards-per-reception at 24.9. His output significantly declined from this point, however. Over the next seven games, he averaged three receptions for 47 yards per game, and had only one touchdown reception (though he added a rushing touchdown in Week 7 against the Cleveland Browns), before an Achilles tendon injury sidelined him for all but one reception over the last five weeks of the season. The one receiving touchdown, a 60-yard reception in Week 8 against the Cincinnati Bengals, was Jackson's record-setting 24th NFL receiving touchdown of 60 yards or more, breaking a tie with Jerry Rice. The record came a week after Jackson became the 47th NFL player to reach 10,000 receiving yards.

The 32-year-old Jackson ended the 2018 season with enough receptions (41 for 774 yards) to qualify as the league-leader in yards-per-reception (18.9) for the fourth time in his career.

=== Philadelphia Eagles (second stint) ===
==== 2019 season ====
On March 13, 2019, Jackson and a 2020 seventh-round selection were traded to the Eagles in exchange for a 2019 sixth-round compensatory selection (Pick #208, used to draft Scotty Miller). Jackson made his return to the Eagles in Week 1 against another former team, the Washington Redskins. In the game, Jackson caught eight passes for 154 yards and two touchdowns (his third and final multiple touchdown game) as the Eagles won 32–27. Both touchdowns were long, putting him at 31 career touchdowns receptions over 50 yards, passing Randy Moss (29) for second in NFL history. He underwent core muscle surgery on November 5, and was subsequently placed on injured reserve.

==== 2020 season ====
In the first three weeks of the 2020 season, Jackson caught 10 passes for 121 yards before missing the next three games due to a hamstring injury. He returned in Week 7, but suffered a lower body injury in the game and was placed on injured reserve on October 26, 2020. He was activated on December 26, 2020. In Week 16 against the Dallas Cowboys, Jackson caught an 81-yard touchdown pass from Jalen Hurts during the 37–17 loss. The touchdown was his record-extending 25th of 60 or more yards and his record-tying 5th of 80 or more yards, joining Jerry Rice, Lance Alworth, Bob Hayes and Derrick Alexander. He finished the 2020 season with 14 receptions for 236 receiving yards and one receiving touchdown in five games. Jackson was released on February 19, 2021.

=== Los Angeles Rams ===
Jackson signed with the Los Angeles Rams on March 21, 2021. Jackson recorded his first touchdown with the Rams in their Week 3 win against the Buccaneers, on a 75-yard pass from Matthew Stafford. On November 2, Jackson was released by the Rams upon request. With the Rams going on to win Super Bowl LVI, Jackson was awarded with a Super Bowl ring due to being on the active roster during the season.

=== Las Vegas Raiders ===
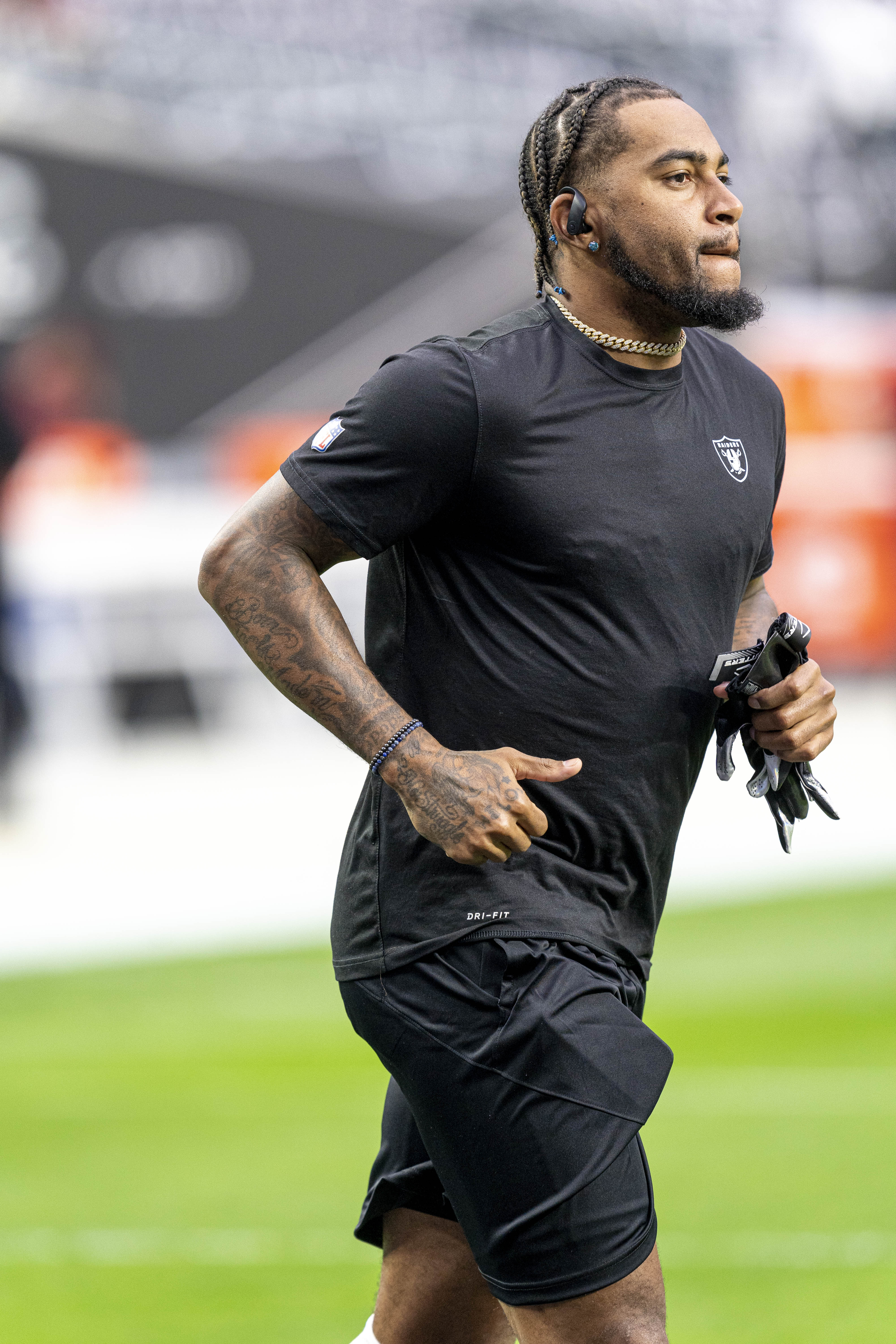
Jackson with the Raiders in 2021

On November 8, 2021, Jackson signed with the Las Vegas Raiders. In Week 12, against the Dallas Cowboys, he had three receptions for 102 yards and a touchdown in the 36–33 victory. In the 2021 season, Jackson had 20 receptions for 454 yards and two touchdowns.

=== Baltimore Ravens ===
On October 18, 2022, Jackson was signed to the Baltimore Ravens' practice squad, and became the oldest active receiver in the NFL. He appeared for the first time in Week 9, and in Week 12 he caught a 62-yard pass to set up the go-ahead touchdown late in the 4th quarter against the Jacksonville Jaguars. He was signed to the Ravens' active roster on December 5, 2022. He was released on January 7, 2023.

=== Retirement ===
On November 29, 2023, Jackson signed a one-day contract with the Philadelphia Eagles to officially retire as a member of the Eagles.

== Career statistics ==
=== NFL ===
Legend
	Led the league
**Bold**	Career high

==== Regular season ====
Year	Team	Games		Receiving					Rushing					Punt returns					Kick returns					Fumbles	
Year	Team	GP	GS	Rec	Yds	Avg	Lng	TD	Att	Yds	Avg	Lng	TD	Ret	Yds	Avg	Lng	TD	Ret	Yds	Avg	Lng	TD	Fum	Lost
2008	PHI	**16**	15	62	912	14.7	60	2	**17**	96	5.6	21	**1**	**50**	440	8.8	68	1	**1**	**12**	**12.0**	**12**	0	**4**	**2**
2009	PHI	15	15	62	1,156	18.6	71T	**9**	11	**137**	12.5	**67T**	**1**	29	**441**	**15.2**	**85**	**2**	**1**	0	0.0	0	0	3	1
2010	PHI	14	14	47	1,056	22.5	**91T**	6	16	104	6.5	31	**1**	20	231	11.6	65	1	—	—	—	—	—	**4**	1
2011	PHI	15	15	58	961	16.6	62T	4	7	41	5.9	18	0	17	114	6.7	51	0	**1**	7	7.0	7	0	1	1
2012	PHI	11	11	45	700	15.6	77T	2	3	−7	−2.3	5	0	1	−3	−3.0	−3	0	—	—	—	—	—	1	0
2013	PHI	**16**	**16**	**82**	**1,332**	16.2	61T	**9**	3	2	0.7	8	0	14	71	5.1	32	0	**1**	10	10.0	10	0	1	0
2014	WAS	15	13	56	1,169	20.9	81T	6	4	7	1.8	9	0	1	0	0.0	0	0	—	—	—	—	—	0	0
2015	WAS	9	9	30	528	17.6	77T	4	—	—	—	—	—	2	−5	−2.5	2	0	**1**	8	8.0	8	0	1	1
2016	WAS	15	15	56	1,005	17.9	80T	4	—	—	—	—	—	—	—	—	—	—	—	—	—	—	—	0	0
2017	TB	14	13	50	668	13.4	41	3	3	38	**12.7**	23	0	—	—	—	—	—	—	—	—	—	—	0	0
2018	TB	12	10	41	774	18.9	75T	4	6	29	4.8	14T	**1**	5	24	4.8	11	0	—	—	—	—	—	0	0
2019	PHI	3	3	9	159	17.7	53T	2	—	—	—	—	—	—	—	—	—	—	—	—	—	—	—	0	0
2020	PHI	5	5	14	236	16.9	81T	1	1	12	12.0	12	0	1	2	2.0	2	0	—	—	—	—	—	0	0
2021	LAR	7	0	8	221	**27.6**	75T	1	—	—	—	—	—	—	—	—	—	—	—	—	—	—	—	0	0
2021	LV	9	4	12	233	19.4	56T	1	1	4	4.0	4	0	—	—	—	—	—	—	—	—	—	—	1	1
2022	BAL	7	1	9	153	17.0	62	0	—	—	—	—	—	—	—	—	—	—	—	—	—	—	—	0	0
Career		183	159	641	11,263	17.6	91T	58	72	463	6.4	67	4	140	1,315	9.4	85	4	5	37	7.4	12	0	16	7

==== Playoffs ====
Year	Team	Games		Receiving					
Year	Team	GP	GS	Tgt	Rec	Yds	Avg	Lng	TD
2008	PHI	**3**	**3**	21	**11**	**207**	18.8	**62**	1
2009	PHI	1	1	7	3	14	4.7	6	1
2010	PHI	1	1	4	2	47	23.5	19	0
2013	PHI	1	1	6	3	53	17.7	40	0
2015	WAS	1	1	5	2	17	8.5	9	0
2021	LV	1	0	2	1	26	**26.0**	0	0
Career		8	7	45	22	364	13.8	62	2

=== College ===
Legend
	Led the NCAA
**Bold**	Career high

Year	Team	Games		Receiving				Rushing				Punt returns				Kick returns			
Year	Team	GP	GS	Rec	Yds	Avg	TD	Att	Yds	Avg	TD	Ret	Yds	Avg	TD	Ret	Yds	Avg	TD
2005	California	11	10	38	601	15.8	7	8	48	6.0	0	1	49	**49.0**	1	0	0	0.0	0
2006	California	13	13	59	**1,060**	**18.0**	**9**	5	19	3.8	0	**25**	**455**	18.2	**4**	**2**	**38**	**19.0**	0
2007	California	12	11	**65**	762	11.7	6	**11**	**132**	**12.0**	1	12	129	10.8	1	0	0	0.0	0
Career		36	34	162	2,423	15.0	22	24	199	8.3	1	38	633	16.7	6	2	38	19.0	0

Additional sources:

== Coaching career ==
=== Woodrow Wilson HS ===
In 2024, Jackson was hired as the offensive coordinator for Woodrow Wilson Classical High School.

=== Delaware State ===
On December 27, 2024, Jackson was named the head football coach at Delaware State University. He led the team to a 8-4 winning record in his first season.

== Head coaching record ==
Year	Team	Overall	Conference	Standing	Bowl/playoffs
Delaware State Hornets (Mid-Eastern Athletic Conference) (2025–present)
2025	Delaware State	8–4	4–1	2nd	
2026	Delaware State	3–3	0–0		
Delaware State:		11–7	4–1		
Total:		11–7			

== Personal life ==
Jackson was featured on the cover of the PlayStation 2 version of NCAA Football 09. Jackson took part and won a competition of Hole in the Wall in April 2011. Jackson had a small role in the 2017 film All Eyez on Me.

Jackson has also received media attention for plays that critics say show poor judgement on his part, and in particular, multiple premature celebrations which have resulted in lost touchdowns. In the movie Silver Linings Playbook, a psychotherapist encourages the protagonist (played by Bradley Cooper) to wear Jackson's jersey.

=== Antisemitism ===
In July 2020, Jackson posted an Instagram story featuring a quote falsely attributed to Adolf Hitler, espousing Black Hebrew Israelite ideology, that read: "because the white Jews knows [sic] that the Negroes are the real Children of Israel and to keep Americas [sic] secret the Jews will blackmail America. They will extort America, their plan for world domination won't work if the Negroes know who they were [sic]." The post also read "Hitler was right."

Jackson posted several quotes from Louis Farrakhan on his Instagram account in which Farrakhan accused Dr. Anthony Fauci and Bill Gates of desiring to "depopulate the Earth" with a COVID-19 vaccine. Farrakhan has been labeled an antisemitic extremist by the Southern Poverty Law Center. Jackson later deleted the posts in question and apologized for his statements.

After the incident, Jackson spoke with leading Philadelphia Jews including Rabbi Doniel Grodnitzky of Chabad Young Philly, Philadelphia 76ers co-owner, Michael G. Rubin, and David J. Adelman, Chairman of the Philadelphia Holocaust Remembrance Foundation. Jackson also talked with a Holocaust survivor Edward Mosberg and agreed to visit the Auschwitz-Birkenau State Museum, a museum on the site of the Auschwitz concentration camp.
