= Simon Muhr Work Training School =

- U.S. National Register of Historic Places
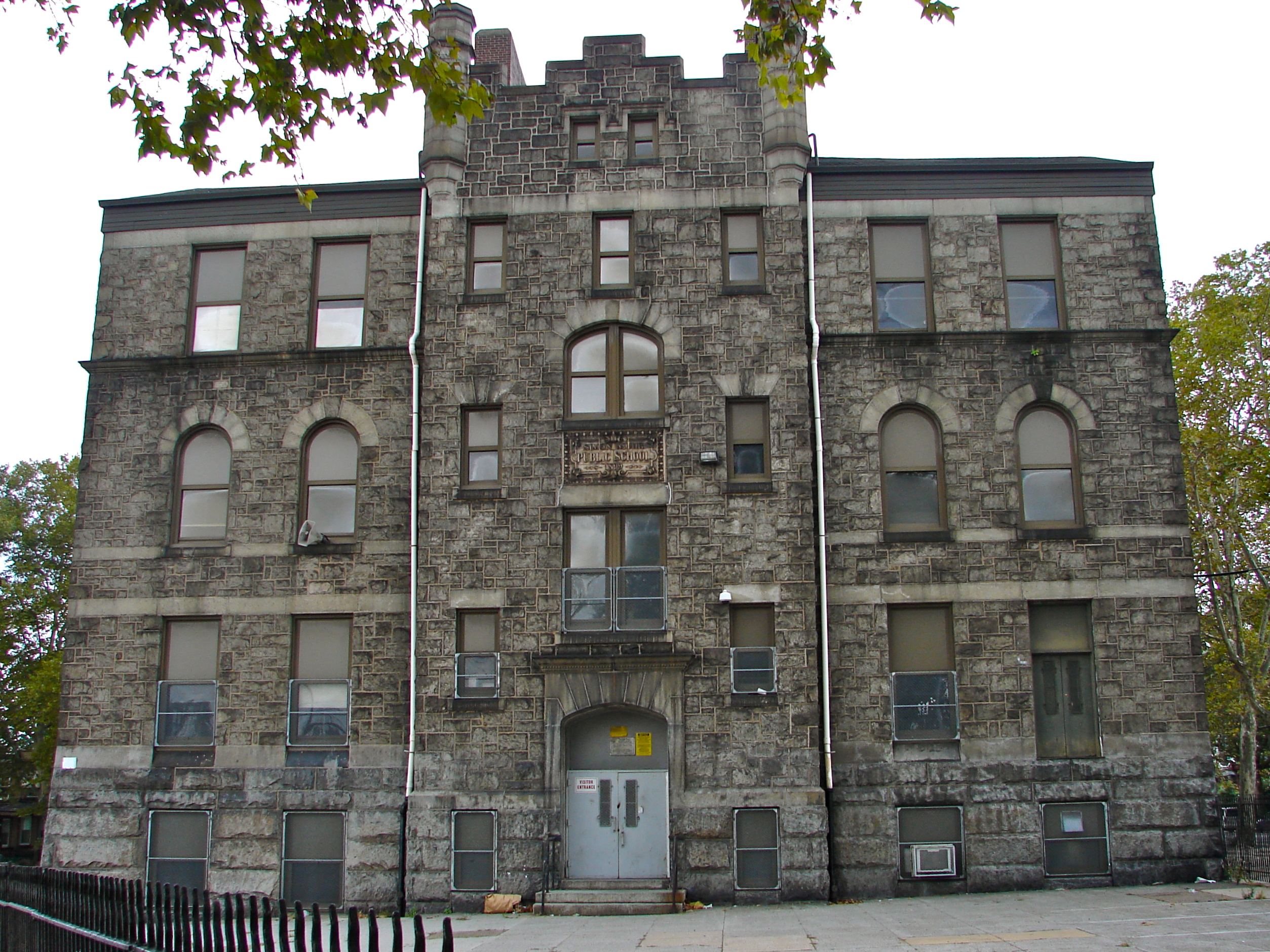
- Simon Muhr Work Training School, September 2010

- Location within Philadelphia Location within Pennsylvania Location within the United States
- Location: Twelfth and Allegheny, Philadelphia, Pennsylvania
- Coordinates: 40°0′3″N 75°8′56″W
- Area: 2 acres (0.81 ha)
- Built: 1899
- Built by: Gourley, Samuel, Jr.
- Architect: Anshutz, Louis W.
- Architectural style: Gothic
- MPS: Philadelphia Public Schools TR
- NRHP reference No.: 86003310
- Added to NRHP: December 1, 1986

The Simon Muhr Work Training School is an historic school building in the Nicetown–Tioga neighborhood of Philadelphia, Pennsylvania, United States.

It was added to the National Register of Historic Places in 1986.

== History and architectural features ==
Built in 1899, this historic structure is a three-story, three-bay, stone building that sits on a raised basement in the Gothic-style. It features a central projecting bay with stepped gable and battlement-like motif.

It was named for Simon Muhr, who bequeathed money for public education in Philadelphia, and was added to the National Register of Historic Places in 1986.

== Notable person ==
Longtime Philadelphia City Councilman at Large David Cohen (politician) was an alumnus of the school.
