= Central Talmud Torah =

Former Jewish school in South Philadelphia

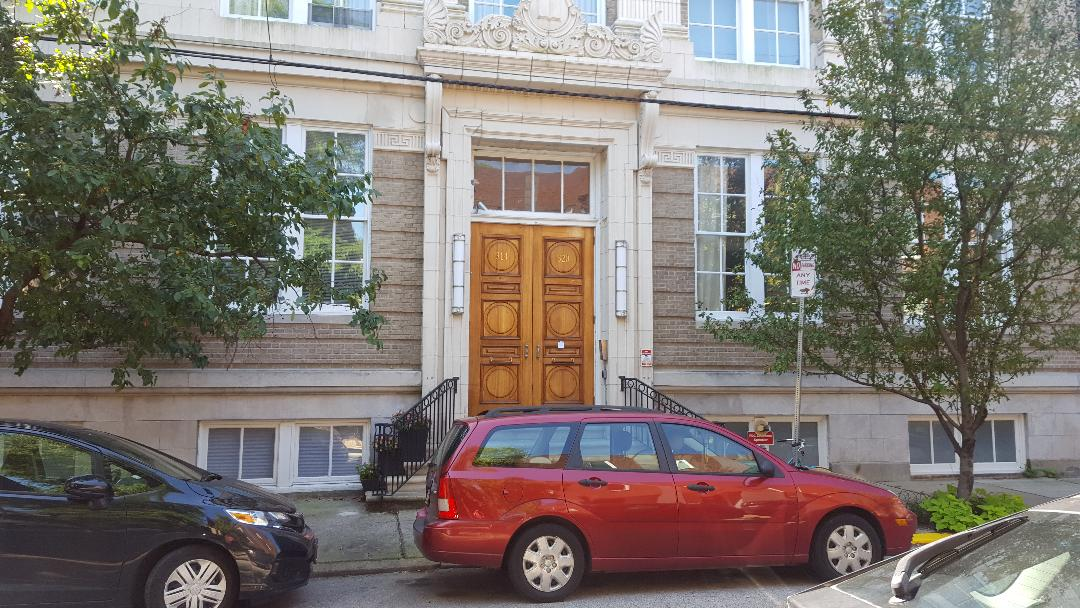
- 314-320 Catharine Street, Philadelphia on August 29, 2019
- Interactive map of the Central Talmud Torah area
- Alternative names: Central Hebrew Free School

General information
- Architectural style: Beaux-Arts architecture
- Location: Queen Village, Philadelphia, 314-320 Catharine Street, Philadelphia, Pennsylvania, United States
- Coordinates: 39.937870°N 75.149020°W
- Inaugurated: October 29, 1911
- Renovated: 1980s

The Central Talmud Torah, also known as the Central Hebrew Free School, was a Jewish parochial school established in 1892 and located at 314-320 Catharine Street until 1963 in the Queen Village neighborhood of South Philadelphia.

Rabbi Bernard L. Levinthal initiated the establishment of the institution to serve the growing number of immigrant Jewish children in the city's Jewish quarter in South Philadelphia.

The Talmud Torah had 400 members in 1899 with an annual income of $3,000; Philip Werner served as its president.

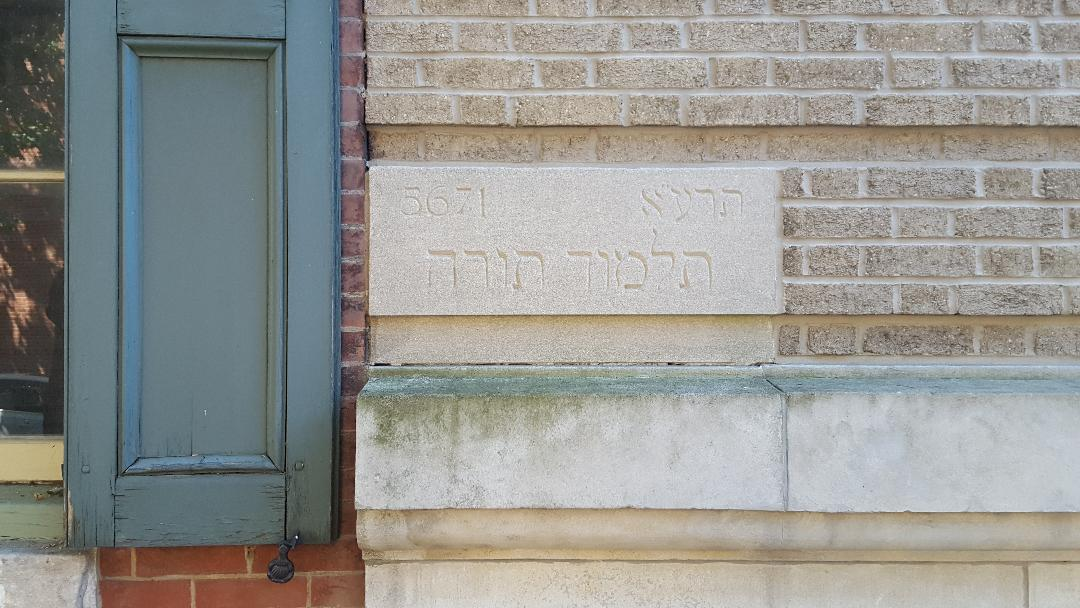
314 Catharine Street cornerstone on August 29, 2019

Wolf Klebansky served as the school's president and raised $75,000 to build the school's building at 314-320 Catharine Street. The new building was dedicated on October 29, 1911. The building could accommodate 1,000 students with 17 classrooms, a library, an auditorium, a gymnasium, and a swimming pool.

The school had 700 students in 1913.

Central Talmud Torah was a "religious public school," free to those unable to pay, that taught Hebrew, Jewish history, and religious studies. Jewish children attended from 4:00 PM–7:00 PM after public school.

The American Jewish Year Book reported the organization counted 7,000 members and $12,000 in total income in 1919.

It was known as Yeshiva Mishkan Yisroel & Central Talmud Torah in 1936.

The building served as the home of the Beth Jacob Day School in the 1950s. It continued to be used for Jewish education until its closure in 1963. The school building was converted to loft condominiums in the 1980s.
