= Samson Levy =

American merchant

- Born: 19 August 1722
- Died: 22 March 1781 (aged 58); Philadelphia, Pennsylvania
- Occupation: Merchant
- Children: Moses Levy, Samson Levy

Samson Levy (August 19, 1722—March 22, 1781) was a prominent Jewish merchant in Philadelphia during the Colonial America.

== Biography ==
Samson Levy was one of the originators of the City Dancing Assembly, a famous social organization of Philadelphia founded in 1748. In November 1765, he signed, with other merchants of the city, including six Jews, the celebrated resolutions not to import goods from England until the Stamp act had been repealed.

== Family ==
Samson Levy was the brother of merchant Benjamin Levy. Samson Levy had two sons, Moses and Samson. Moses Levy was educated at the University of Pennsylvania, from which he graduated in 1776. On March 19, 1778, he was admitted to the bar; from 1802 to 1822 he was recorder of Philadelphia; from 1822 to 1825, presiding judge of the district court for the city and county of Philadelphia. At one time he was a member of the Pennsylvania legislature, and he was a trustee of the University of Pennsylvania for twenty-four years. Samson Levy (b. Philadelphia 1761; d. there December 15, 1831) studied law with his brother Moses; was admitted to the bar on June 9, 1787, and became one of the best-known lawyers of the city. He was one of the incorporators of the Pennsylvania Academy of the Fine Arts.
