= Moses Levy (Pennsylvanian) =

American lawyer (1757–1826)

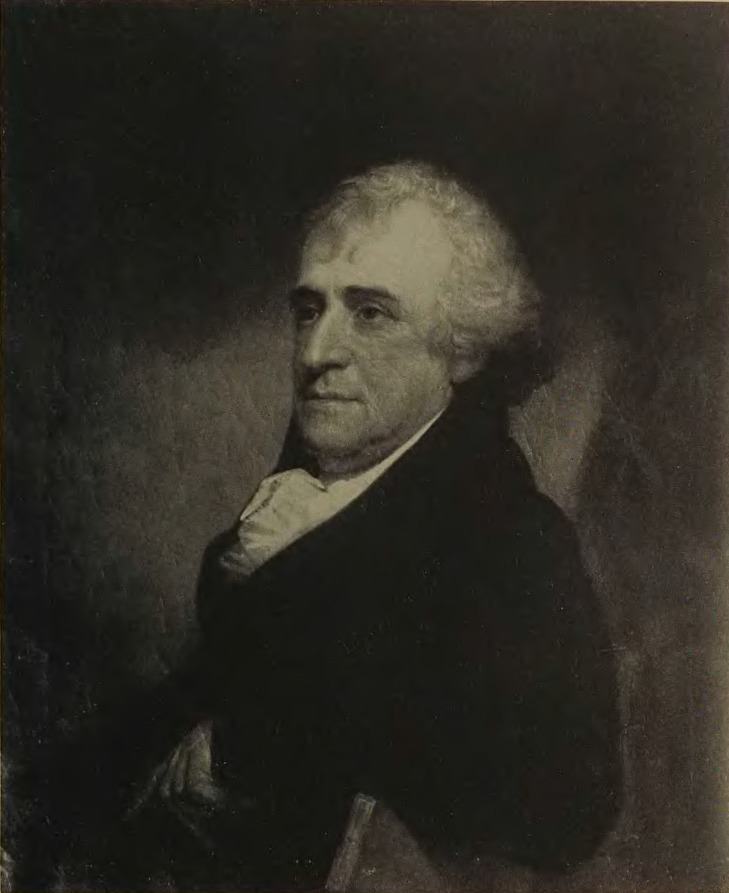
- portrait by Rembrandt Peale
- Born: 1757; Philadelphia
- Died: 9 May 1826; Philadelphia
- Education: University of Pennsylvania
- Occupations: Lawyer, politician
- Father: Samson Levy
- Relatives: Samson Levy

Moses Levy (1757 in Philadelphia – May 9, 1826, in Philadelphia) was a prominent Jew in Colonial America.

== Biography ==
Moses Levy was born in 1757 in Philadelphia. His father, Samson Levy, was a signatory of the celebrated resolutions not to import goods from England until the Stamp Act had been repealed. Moses was educated at the University of Pennsylvania, from which he graduated in 1772. On March 19, 1778, he was admitted to the bar. He was one of the attorneys defending the rebels of the Whiskey Rebellion from treason charges. From 1802 to 1822 he was recorder of Philadelphia; and from 1822 to 1825, presiding judge of the district court for the city and county of Philadelphia. At one time he was a member of the Pennsylvania legislature, and he was a trustee of the University of Pennsylvania for twenty-four years. Levy died on May 9, 1826, in Philadelphia.

== See also ==
- History of the Jews in Colonial America
- List of first minority male lawyers and judges in Pennsylvania
