= David Franks (aide-de-camp) =

Continental Army staff officer

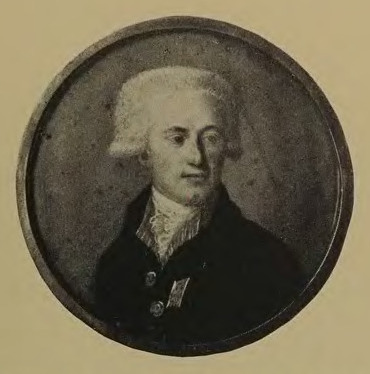
Portrait by Charles Willson Peale

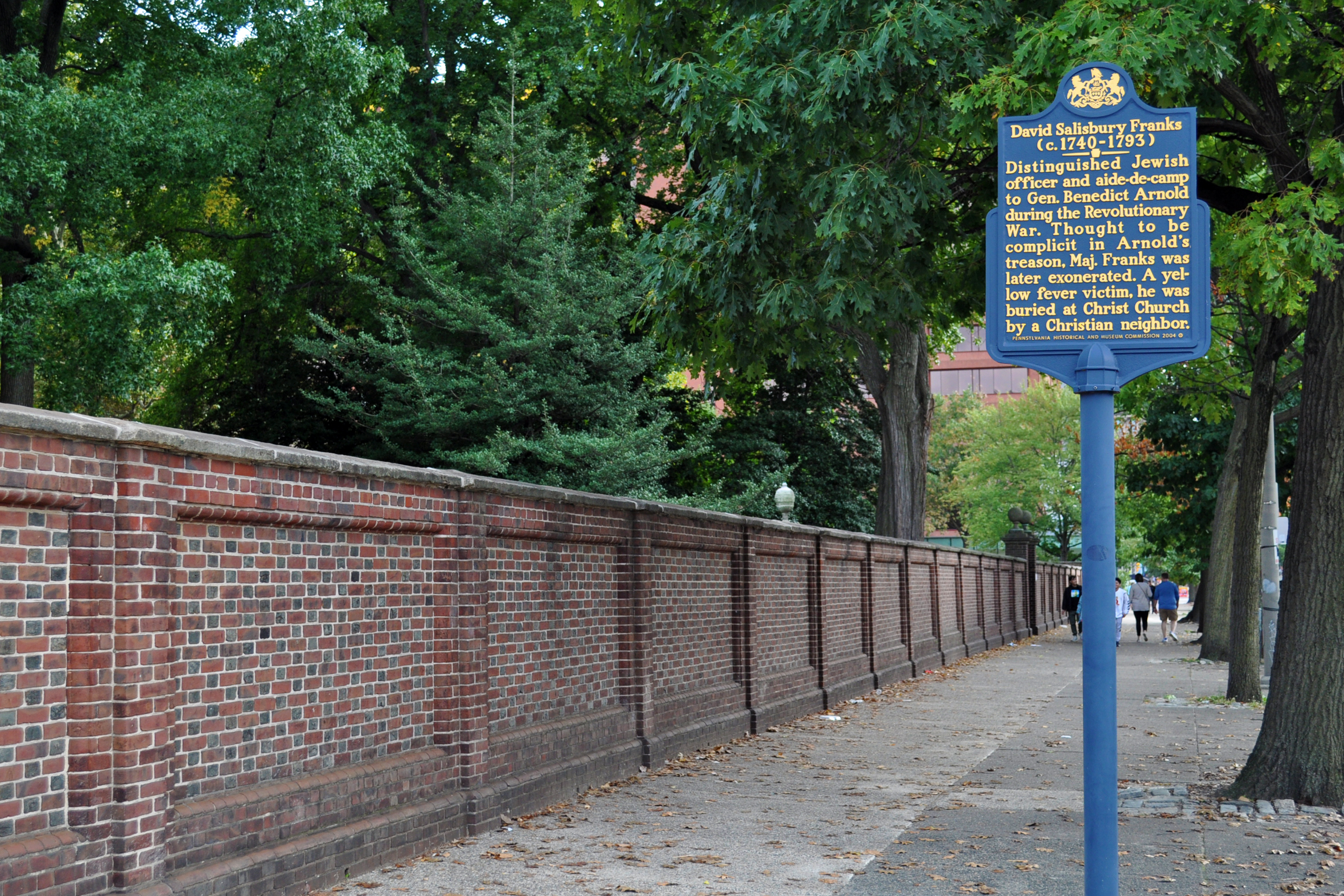
David Salisbury Franks Historical Marker at N 5th and Arch Sts. Philadelphia PA

David Salisbury Franks (27 March 1740 – 7 October 1793) was a lieutenant colonel in the Continental Army during the American Revolutionary War. He was one of two aides-de-camp for General Benedict Arnold during the war. Franks was officially exonerated and cleared of any complicity with General Arnold's act of treason, and was later chosen to travel to Paris to deliver to Benjamin Franklin the official copy of the peace treaty that ended the war and granted American independence.

== Biography ==
Born in Philadelphia, Pennsylvania, David Salisbury Franks was living in Quebec with his parents when the American Revolution broke out. A Jew, Franks in 1775 was president of the Spanish and Portuguese Synagogue of Montreal, the oldest Jewish congregation in Canada, but then less than a decade old (Franks' congregation should not be confused with a similarly named congregation in New York). According to the late historian Jacob Rader Marcus, Franks publicly defended the right of a protester to compare King George III to the Pope and call him a fool, and was subsequently jailed for 16 days. The experience convinced him to join the Patriot cause, and, when an American expedition led by Benedict Arnold and Richard Montgomery invaded Quebec in 1775, Franks joined them. He was appointed paymaster of the Continental Army in Quebec and apparently expended his own funds to pay the salaries of the American volunteers. Franks was promoted to major and was assigned as Arnold's aide-de-camp.

On the failure of the American campaign in Canada, Franks withdrew in July 1776 to Philadelphia, where he joined the Continental Army and served until October 1777. Because he spoke French, Franks was then assigned as liaison officer to the Comte d'Estaing, commander of the French naval forces fighting on the American side.

Franks served as aide-de-camp to Arnold at West Point at the time of Arnold's attempt to hand over the fort to the British. He and another subordinate, Richard Varick, were both cleared of complicity in Arnold's treachery.

After Franks was returned to active duty, General George Washington had him assigned to his command. The other officers of Franks's own regiment started a whispering campaign against him. Seeking to clear his name definitively, Franks asked General Washington to initiate another court-martial, one that would investigate—rather than simply drop—the scurrilous charges against him. After a month-long investigation, the court issued a thorough report completely exonerating Franks.

A promotion in rank immediately followed. Franks was entrusted to carry highly secret documents to diplomats Benjamin Franklin in Paris and John Jay in Madrid. In 1783, Franks returned to Philadelphia, but soon left for Paris to deliver to Franklin the official copy of the peace treaty that ended the war and granted American independence. According to his accounts, Franks often paid more of his expenses than his young nation could afford to reimburse.

At war's end, Franks was made American vice-consul at Marseille. In 1786, he served as American envoy in the treaty negotiations between the United States and the potentates of Morocco.

Despite his complete exoneration, the trust of Washington, and his long service to his country, Jeffersonian Republicans launched vicious attacks on Franks for his association with Arnold. In 1786, the attacks succeeded and Franks was dismissed from the diplomatic corps. He returned to the United States discredited and bankrupt.

Franks was given a grant of land for his services and a position in the Bank of the United States, but he died in poverty. After he succumbed to yellow fever in the great epidemic of 1793 in Philadelphia, he was saved from a pauper's grave by a neighbor, who had him interred in Christ Church Burial Ground.

Franks was a member of the Society of the Cincinnati.
