= M. Levin & Co, Inc =

Distribution company

M. Levin & Company, Inc.
- Company type: Privately held company
- Industry: Wholesale marketing
- Founded: 1906
- Headquarters: 6700 Essington Ave Unit H2-H5; Philadelphia, Pennsylvania
- Key people: Mark Levin, David Levin, Michael Levin, Joel Segel; Michael Levin, Founder + President (1906-1950); Albert Levin, President (1950-1977)
- Products: Produce
- Website: www.mlevinco.com

M. Levin & Company, Inc., is an American full-line wholesale produce distribution company located in Philadelphia, Pennsylvania. The company was established in 1906, and is the oldest family-owned produce wholesaler at the Philadelphia Wholesale Produce Market. Levin is one of the largest ripeners and banana food service distributors in the Mid-Atlantic region, ripening over 30,000 boxes weekly. The company is owned and operated by its third- and fourth-generation family members.

== Operations ==
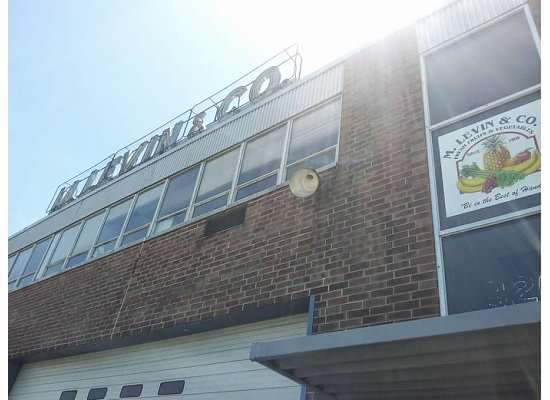
M. Levin & Co., 326 Pattison Avenue, Philadelphia (2014)

M. Levin relocated its operations to the Philadelphia Wholesale Produce Market when it opened its new location in 2011 with four units including custom built ripening rooms.

M. Levin & Co. processes full lines of fresh fruits and vegetables, packages and distributes them to retailers. Bananas and tropicals remain the company's primary specialty. M. Levin imports bananas from Central and South America, and receives them through ports in Wilmington, Baltimore, and Camden. As of March 2014, M. Levin ripened about 35,000 boxes of bananas a week. The company distributes west to Ohio, south to Virginia, and north to Toronto.

The company is privately owned and operated by Mark Levin, David Levin, Michael Levin, and Joel Segel, and their daughters.

Michael Levin started selling bananas in 1906, and grew the company until his passing in 1958. Albert Levin, one of Michael Levin's children, served as president from 1950 to 1976. Albert led the business through its 1959 move to Pattison Avenue, and grew it through the 1960s and 1970s. Brothers Leon and Martin Levin bought the company in 1976 when Albert retired, and their sons continue to operate the business.

== Dock Street Wholesale Produce Market, 1906-1959 ==
Michael Levin started with a pushcart in 1906 and had his first location in a one-room cellar at 315 S. 2nd Street. In a few years he was buying bananas in larger quantities and selling wholesale. He ripened bananas in cellars he rented around Dock Street. In the 1920s, Michael Levin had grown his banana distribution so much that the Atlantic Fruit Company, a major banana supplier at the time, turned over its Philadelphia banana-ripening business to Levin. The ripening deal helped cement M. Levin's place in the banana-ripening world. During World War II, banana shipments stopped to the port in Philadelphia and all U.S. ports except those in Florida. Michael Levin went to Florida where he purchased bananas and shipped them by rail to Philadelphia. The company controlled banana distribution on the East Coast including New York, Pittsburgh, and Washington. After the War, Levin landed a contract to supply Acme Markets with all of its bananas, and would come to supply Food Fair, A&P, and Penn Fruit stores.

== Food Distribution Center, 1959-2011 ==
On June 28, 1948, Congress passed Public Law 795, H.R. 5053 to authorize the creation of Independence National Historical Park, and it was formally established on July 4, 1956. From 1957 to 1959, the Greater Philadelphia Movement, the Redevelopment Authority and the Old Philadelphia Development Corporation bought 31 acres (130,000 m^{2}) around Dock Street. They demolished and relocated the Dock Street market.

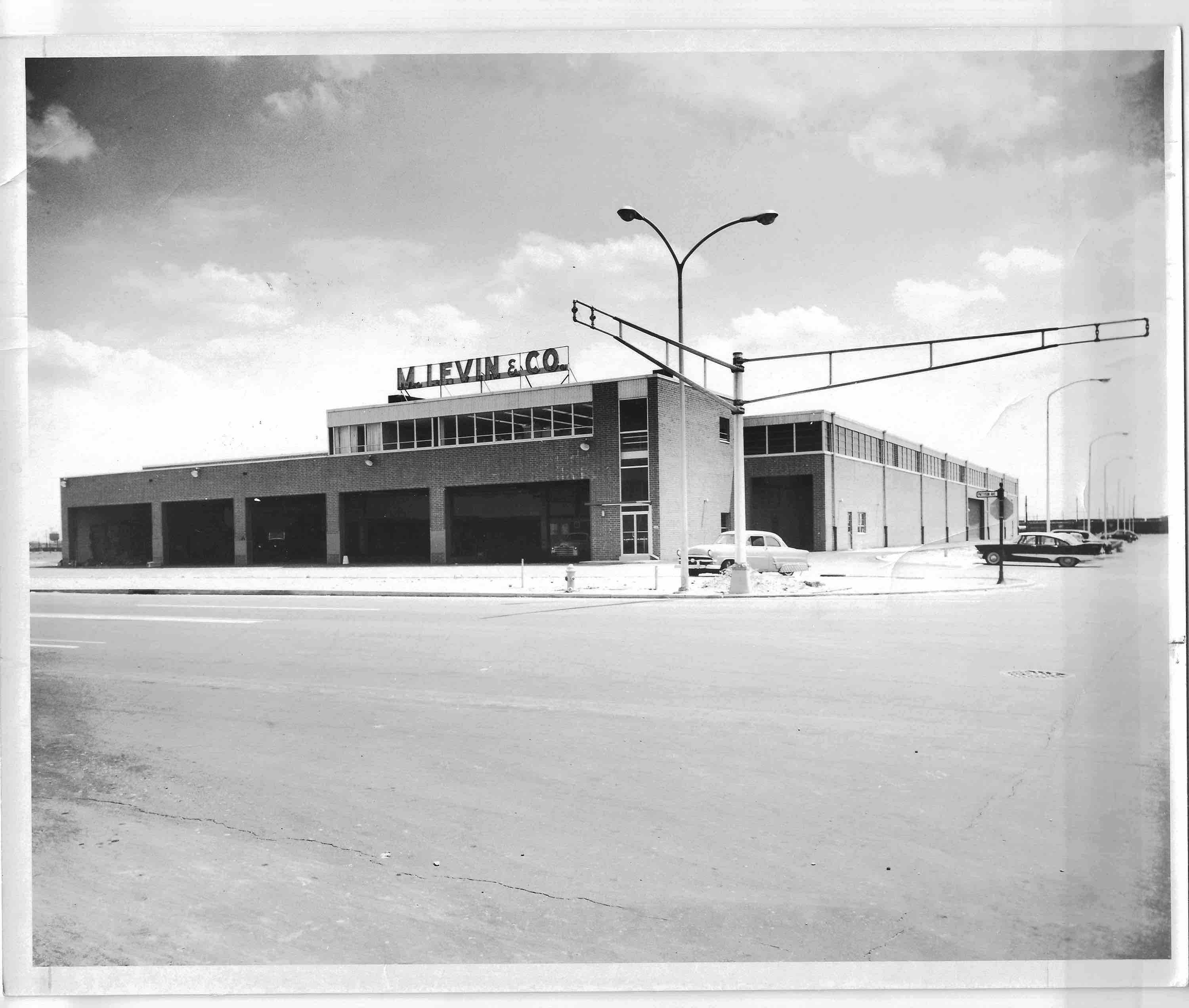
M. Levin & Co., 326 Pattison Avenue, Philadelphia (1959)

In the 1950s, city and business leaders planned and built the Food Distribution Center on 388 acres between Packer and Pattison Avenues. Levin had the largest banana ripening, packaging, and distribution plan on the east coast, and Michael Levin was the first merchant to commit to move his business from the Dock Street wholesale produce market. When the Dock Street market closed in June 1959, M. Levin was storing and ripening bananas in more than a dozen buildings, including a former pickle factory.

Son Albert Levin became president of the company in 1950 and led M. Levin through the 1959 move to Pattison Avenue across the street from the Center on South Galloway Street. M. Levin operated out of its warehouse with sales, ripening facilities, and a railroad spur for boxcars, located at 326 Pattison Avenue from 1959. Albert Levin continued to grow the operations and business through the 1970s, and retired in 1977.

The Pattison Avenue facility remained open through 2015. It was a 200,000-square-foot warehouse, and was designed to allow railcars to come into the building. The warehouse contained 28 climate-controlled rooms for banana storage and ripening. Each held up to 1,500 cases of bananas.

== Philadelphia Wholesale Produce Market, 2011-present ==
The new Philadelphia Wholesale Produce Market opened on June 5, 2011, on Essington Avenue in the city's southwest section of the city. It was built on 48 acres, and is 700,000 square feet M. Levin & Co. was active in the planning and construction, and invested $1 million beyond normal expenses to build banana-ripening rooms within its four unit market warehousing space. The company continued to retain and operate in the 336 Pattison Avenue location until May 2018. In February 2016, M. Levin was selling 35,000 boxes of bananas per week.

In August 2018, the Philadelphia Inquirer voted M. Levin to be a recipient of the 2018 Multi-Generational Family Business Award based on their overall impact, community involvement, innovation and growth.

The company marked its 115th year in business in 2021.

In 2022, M. Levin & Co's Controller, Tracie Levin, a fourth-generation family member, was elected as the first woman to serve on the board of directors of the Philadelphia Wholesale Produce Market.
