= Horwitz-Wasserman Holocaust Memorial Plaza =

Holocaust memorial in Pennsylvania, US

Coordinates: 39.9553°N 75.1675°W

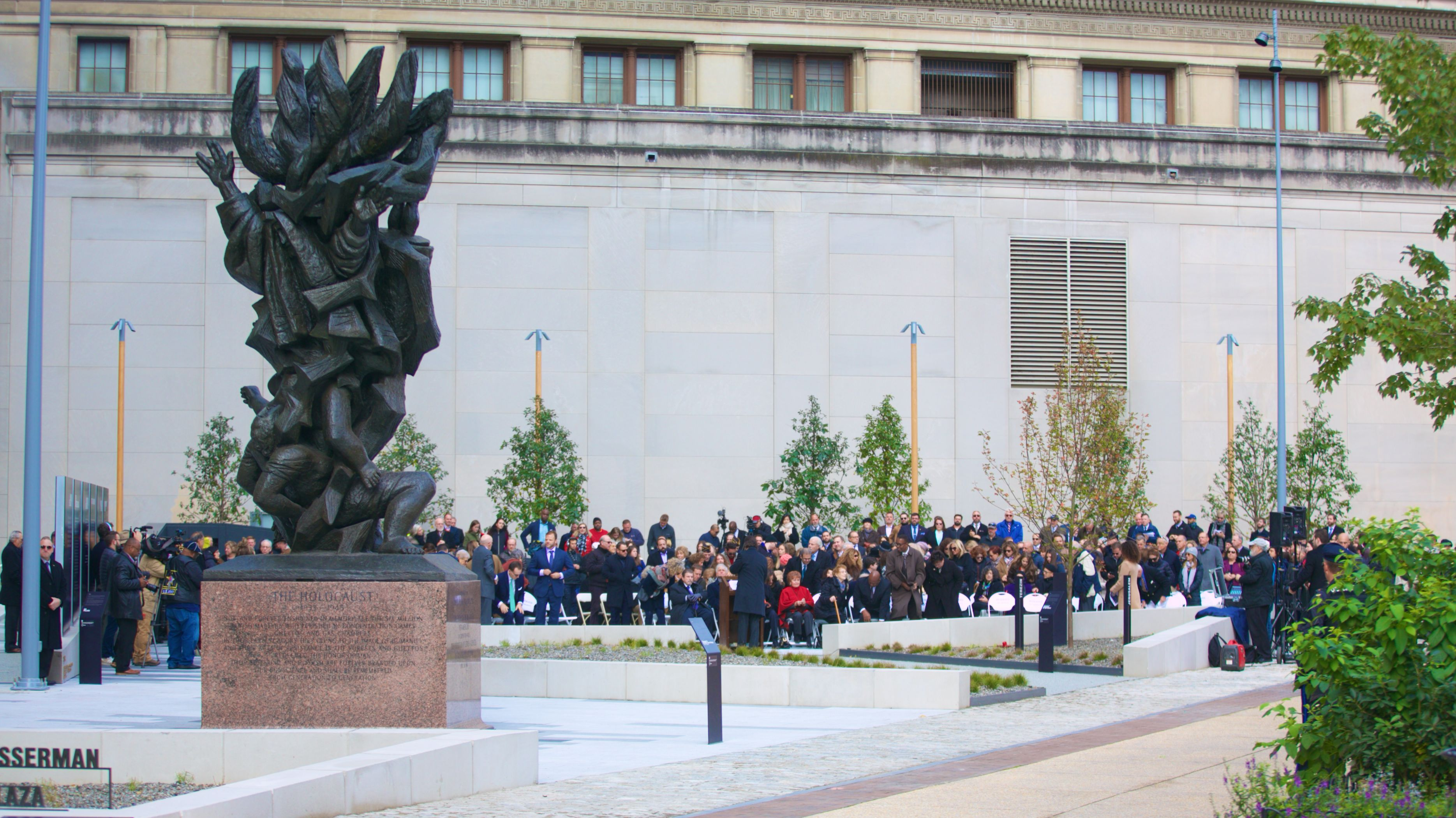
- Formation: 1964
- Location: N. 16th Street and Benjamin Franklin Parkway, Philadelphia, Pennsylvania, 19103
- Co-Chairs: Matthew Pestronk, Jacob Reiter
- Treasurer: Jared Szychter
- Secretary: Steven J. Kessler
- Vice Chairs: David J. Adelman, Corie Moskow
- Parent organization: Philadelphia Holocaust Remembrance Foundation

The Horwitz-Wasserman Holocaust Memorial Plaza is a Holocaust memorial park located at the intersection of the Benjamin Franklin Parkway, 16th Street and Arch Street in Philadelphia, Pennsylvania. The plaza includes the Monument to the Six Million Jewish Martyrs, which was dedicated in 1964, as well as several new elements that were added in the plaza’s significant 2018 expansion.

== History ==
On April 26, 1964, the Association of Jewish New Americans, a Philadelphia survivor organization, and the Federation of Jewish Agencies of Greater Philadelphia dedicated the Monument to the Six Million Martyrs, “arguably the first public Holocaust memorial” in the United States. Designed by Nathan Rapoport, the monument depicts the flame of a burning bush with several bodies writhing in suffering. One pair of hands is shown holding a Torah scroll, while fists clutch daggers near the top of the sculpture as a symbol of resistance. The monument pays homage to the biblical burning bush in Exodus, which blazed with fire, but was not consumed, and through which God promised to rescue the Jewish people.

The Philadelphia Holocaust Remembrance Foundation worked on preserving the existing monument and redeveloping the site around it with historical artifacts and educational elements.

The expanded plaza was completed in October 2018.

== Vandalism ==
On 14 January 2024, the memorial was defaced with a swastika.

== Design features ==
In addition to the Monument to the Six Million Jewish Martyrs, the Plaza’s interpretive elements include:

- Six pillars, erected in memory of the six million Jewish martyrs of the Holocaust, which contrast atrocities of the Holocaust with American constitutional protections and values.
- Three original train tracks from the railroad leading to the death camps.
- A sapling from a silver maple tree that was nurtured by children in the Theresienstadt Ghetto.
- A tree grove representing the forests that sheltered partisans who fought the Nazis.
- A remembrance wall, with an embedded eternal flame to signify hope.

The plaza also features multimedia content via IWalk, a USC Shoah Foundation-developed mobile app.

== Messages and goals ==
According to the Philadelphia Holocaust Remembrance Foundation, the plaza is designed to highlight the dangers of totalitarianism and how it can be prevented in America through fidelity to the Constitution of the United States.
