= Holly Kinser =

American lobbyist (born 1965)

- Born: 1965 (age 59–60); Orinda, California, U.S.
- Education: Scripps College
- Occupation: lobbyist
- Spouse: Bill DeWeese (married 1992, divorced 1999)

Holly Kinser (born 1965) is a Pennsylvania lobbyist, where she is the President of The Kinser Group. As a lobbyist for the City of Philadelphia, she is credited with driving legislation in the Pennsylvania General Assembly, including a rental-car and hotel tax, to help fund the construction of sports stadiums and to expand the Philadelphia International Airport. Details of her marriage and subsequent divorce to former Speaker of the Pennsylvania House of Representatives Bill DeWeese garnered significant coverage in the media.

== Early years and education ==
A native of Orinda, California, Kinser's father ran an executive search company. When Kinser was 17, her father became a personnel director for the Reagan White House and she moved with her family to Washington, D.C. She took a summer job with the Republican National Committee, an organization where she worked until she graduated from Scripps College, where she majored in history and was the swim team captain. She took a position with International Paper, who sent her to Harrisburg in 1990 to open their lobbying office. A year later she began seeing Bill DeWeese socially, and they married in December 1992.

== Career ==
In 1992, DeWeese supplanted Robert W. O'Donnell as Speaker of the Pennsylvania House of Representatives and in 1994 Kinser's allies Tom Ridge and Rick Santorum were elected. She then took a position with Greenlee Associates and began lobbying on behalf of Philadelphia and was able to help pass rental-car tax that helped fund the stadiums, the airport expansion funding, and the one percent hotel tax that fuels the Greater Philadelphia Tourism Marketing Corporation. It was during this time that rumors of a relationship between her and then-Mayor of Philadelphia Ed Rendell began. Both Rendell and Kinser deny any impropriety in their relationship.

Kinser and DeWeese separated in 1999. She began seeing Ed Linsley, a manager at Philadelphia Four Seasons Hotel. DeWeese, who was served the divorce papers on the House floor blamed Rendell for the dissolution of his marriage. In 2001, Kinser moved to Chicago and took a job with the small public-relations firm Kemper Lesnick when Linsley was assigned to the Chicago Four Seasons.

In June 2002, Kinser sought to return to the Harrisburg lobbying community and DeWeese asked lobbyist Stephen Wojdak not to hire Kinser. Later that year, Wojdak hired Kinser; accounts conflict on the specifics of what happened in the earlier meeting and whether Wojdak had actually broken any agreement. DeWeese penned a letter (eventually leaked to PoliticsPA and published to wide dissemination) calling Wojdak an "abject, ignoble, mendacious knave." In relatiation, DeWeese sought to keep Wojdak off of the board of the Philadelphia Convention Center Authority.

During the 2002 Pennsylvania gubernatorial election, rumors spread that Republican Mike Fisher's campaign was preparing to air a negative television advertisement discussing her relationship with the Democratic nominee for Governor Ed Rendell. In two incidents in one evening, Kinser loudly and publicly confronted Fisher's television man, John Brabender, and campaign manager, Kent Gates regarding these rumors, reportedly telling Gates "I hate your guts". In a March 2003 article in the Philadelphia Magazine, Sabrina Erdely suggested that Kinser had confronted the Fisher staffers in a deliberate attempt to increase her public profile.

== Awards and accolades ==
In 2003, she was named to the PoliticsPA "Power 50" list of politically influential personalities, where it was noted that her "lobbying talent speaks for itself." In 2010, Politics Magazine named her one of the most influential Democrats in Pennsylvania.
