= Cozen O'Connor =

American multinational law firm

Cozen O'Connor P.C.
- Headquarters: One Liberty Place; Philadelphia, Pennsylvania
- No. of offices: 34
- No. of attorneys: 1,000+
- Revenue: ▲US$803 Million (2025)
- Profit per equity partner: ▲US$1.29 Million (2025)
- Date founded: 1970
- Founder: Stephen A. Cozen; Patrick J. O'Connor
- Company type: Professional corporation
- Website: cozen.com

Headquarters of Cozen O'Connor at One Liberty Place in Philadelphia.

Cozen O'Connor P.C. is a multinational law firm headquartered in Philadelphia, Pennsylvania, with offices in New York City, Washington, D.C., Minneapolis, Chicago, and Los Angeles.

Founded in 1970, it has expanded to more than 1,000 lawyers in 34 offices across North America and Europe. The firm was 77th on the Am Law 100 rankings of the largest 100 U.S. law firms by revenue in 2025, and 95th on the Global 200 in 2025.

Michael J. Heller is CEO and chairman of the firm.

== History ==
=== Formation of Government Relations Subsidiary ===
Founded in September 2009, Cozen O'Connor Public Strategies is a subsidiary that operates out of its offices. Chaired by Mark Alderman, it also includes Managing Partner, Howard Schweitzer, the first COO of the Troubled Asset Relief Program.

=== Involvement in the Mayoral campaign of Bob Brady ===
The firm filed a lawsuit in the Philadelphia County Court of Common Pleas against the Philadelphia Board of Ethics in an attempt to lift campaign contribution limits for the 2007 Philadelphia mayoral election.

It had represented Bob Brady in his efforts off a ballot challenge from Tom Knox, and wanted to be paid for its work. City law limited campaign contributions to $2,500 for individuals and $10,000 for law firms, political action committees and unincorporated businesses.

In February 2011, the court ruled that the firm has the standing to challenge the ethics board. In reversing the lower courts, Justice Max Baer said Cozen O'Connor sufficiently pleaded in its declaratory judgment action its own inability to forgive the total debt without violating campaign finance laws.

=== Merger with Moss & Barnett ===
In 2025, it was announced that Cozen O'Connor would merge with the Minneapolis-based firm Moss & Barnett, adding more than 50 lawyers to its roster. On January 5, 2026, it was reported that the merger had been completed.
