= Savitt =

Savitt is a surname. Notable people with the surname include:

- David Savitt (1928–2018), American politician
- Dick Savitt (1927–2023), American tennis player
- Jan Savitt (1907–1948), American musician
- Jill Savitt (fl. 1985–2015), American film and TV editor
- Sam Savitt (1917–2000), American artist, writer, and illustrator
- Scott Savitt (fl. 1983–2016), American journalist and editor
