= Kinser =

Kinser is a surname. Notable people with the surname include:

- Charleen Kinser (1934–2008), American toy-designer
- Cynthia D. Kinser (born 1951), American judge
- Elbert L. Kinser (1922–1945), United States Marine and Medal of Honor recipient
- Holly Kinser (born 1965), American lobbyist
- John Douglas Kinser (1918–1951), American murder victim
- Kraig Kinser (born 1984), American racing driver
- Mark Kinser (born 1964), American racing driver
- Sheldon Kinser (1942–1988), American racing driver
- Steve Kinser (born 1954), American racing driver

== See also ==
- Camp Kinser, a United States Marine Corps base in Okinawa, Japan
