= Bill DeWeese =

American politician (born 1950)

H. William DeWeese

Member of the Pennsylvania House of Representatives from the 50th district
- In office May 10, 1976 – April 24, 2012
- Preceded by: Donald Davis
- Succeeded by: Pam Snyder

135th Speaker of the Pennsylvania House of Representatives
- In office January 5, 1993 – November 30, 1994
- Preceded by: Bob O'Donnell
- Succeeded by: Matt Ryan

Democratic Leader of the Pennsylvania House of Representatives
- In office January 3, 1995 – November 30, 2008
- Preceded by: Ivan Itkin
- Succeeded by: Todd Eachus
- In office January 23, 1990 – November 30, 1992
- Preceded by: Bob O'Donnell
- Succeeded by: Ivan Itkin

Democratic Whip of the Pennsylvania House of Representatives
- In office January 6, 2009 – December 19, 2009
- Preceded by: Keith McCall
- Succeeded by: Frank Dermody
- In office January 3, 1989 – January 23, 1990
- Preceded by: Bob O'Donnell
- Succeeded by: Ivan Itkin

Personal details
- Born: April 18, 1950 (age 76) Pittsburgh, Pennsylvania, U.S.
- Party: Democratic
- Spouse(s): Holly Kinser (married 1992, divorced 1999), Camera Bartolotta
- Education: Wake Forest University

Military service
- Allegiance: United States
- Branch/service: U.S. Marine Corps
- Years of service: 1972–1975

H. William DeWeese (born April 18, 1950) is an American politician who is a former member of the Pennsylvania House of Representatives. A member of the Democratic Party, DeWeese served as the 135th Speaker of the Pennsylvania House from 1993 to 1994. After five years of investigation by Republican State Attorney General Tom Corbett, he was indicted in December 2009 on six charges of conflict of interest, theft and criminal conspiracy on accusations that two members of his staff used state resources to campaign for political office. The trial began January 23, 2010. He was re-elected in 2010 despite the charges, but was convicted of five of the six felony charges on February 6, 2012.

In April 2012, DeWeese was sentenced to 30 to 60 months in state prison, and subsequently resigned his house seat. He maintains that the prosecution was politically motivated, and part of an ongoing feud with Corbett, who became Governor in 2011.

== Background ==
DeWeese was born April 18, 1950, in Pittsburgh and raised in rural Greene County. After earning a B.A. in history at Wake Forest University, he joined the United States Marine Corps 1972–1975.

== State House ==
After leaving the Marines, DeWeese was elected to the Pennsylvania House in a 1976 special election and represented the 50th district (consisting of all of Greene and parts of Fayette and Washington Counties) for the ensuing thirty-six years.

DeWeese's ascent through the echelons of House Democratic leadership began when he was elected by his colleagues as Majority Whip in 1988. Upon the death of Speaker of the House James Manderino, DeWeese was elected House Majority Leader in January 1990, serving in that position until he was elected Speaker of the House for the 1993–94 term. In 1994, he lost the Speakership when Democratic Rep. Tom Stish switched parties, giving the GOP the majority.

He went on to serve as Minority Leader from 1994 until 2006. With the election of fellow Democrat Ed Rendell as Governor of Pennsylvania in 2003, DeWeese was able to wield more influence than otherwise would have been expected from a Minority legislator.

Following November 2006 elections, a tight race in Chester County gave a slim 102-101 majority to the Democrats, DeWeese became Democratic speaker-designate. Days before the General Assembly convened on January 2, 2007, Rep. Thomas Caltagirone of Berks County announced he would not support DeWeese as speaker but would remain a Democrat. For the second time, DeWeese was denied the speakership by a member of his own party. DeWeese then nominated Philadelphia County Republican Rep. Dennis O'Brien for the office of Speaker. O'Brien defeated fellow Northeast Philadelphia Republican John Perzel in a 105–97 vote.

=== Role in the 2005 legislative pay raise ===
DeWeese supported a legislative and judicial pay raise in 2005. After criticism from the media and activist groups, DeWeese joined his colleagues in a near unanimous repeal of the pay raise.

DeWeese reorganized the Democratic Caucus following the vote. Members who voted in favor of the pay raise were promoted to those positions; while those who voted against lost such positions as a result of their opposition. Republicans and a small number of fellow Democrats, including Governor Ed Rendell, criticized DeWeese's move; but he stood by his decision, explaining that those who opposed the pay-raise legislation knew the realignment would be a consequence.

Despite the defeats of several legislative leaders in the wake of the pay scandal, DeWeese fought off a 2006 primary election challenge and was elected for an additional term in office on November 7, 2006.

=== 2007 speaker election ===
In 2006, the Democratic party won a 102–101 majority in the House, giving DeWeese a second chance at the speaker's gavel. However, several Democratic representatives were rumored to be unhappy with DeWeese. Among them were Rep. Rosita Youngblood of Philadelphia, whom DeWeese accused of being "owned lock, stock and barrel" by Perzel Incorporated. Caltagirone publicly announced his intention to support Perzel, thereby denying DeWeese the Speakership. However, Democrats foiled Perzel's move by nominating a Republican, Dennis O'Brien for Speaker. O'Brien went on to win the election.

=== Bonus investigation ===
DeWeese initially attempted to block Pennsylvania Attorney General Tom Corbett's investigation into whether the House Democratic caucus made illegal payments to staffers, with motions to quash subpoenas and exclude evidence seized.

The Pennsylvania Supreme Court denied petitions to block the subpoenas. DeWeese negotiated an agreement with the Office of Attorney General to turn over evidence, but the terms of the negotiation have not been made public.

Documents DeWeese turned over to the Attorney General revealed that DeWeese acknowledged awarding bonuses for campaign work and used a state-paid consultant to perform political tasks. Despite the fact that the email said "Thank you for the bonus for campaigning", DeWeese argued that he thought he was being thanked for a Christmas bonus. Alternatively, DeWeese has argued that the response did not come from him. Evidence also showed that DeWeese and his top aides directed a state-paid consultant to perform political work.

Evidence in the case also revealed DeWeese's bizarre personal demands of his staff. His aides allegedly balanced his checkbook, paid bills, picked up dry cleaning, bought condoms, and arranged dinner dates from a list of women. His driver was asked to arrange items in the trunk of his car according to a diagram on a card. DeWeese was not charged in connection with the use of his state-paid staff for personal errands.

On December 15, 2009, DeWeese was indicted on one count of conflict of interest, four counts of theft and one count of criminal conspiracy.

He was accused of paying a full-time political operative with state funds and directing his district office staff to do political work on state time. That operative later said he spent 40% of his time on campaigns. That operative was not charged because he made his allegations against his former boss under protection of immunity.

He survived calls for his resignation from reform activists and his fellow state representatives. DeWeese did not step down and was re-elected in 2008 over Republican Greg Hopkins. With Keith McCall receiving the party nomination for Speaker after the 2008 elections, DeWeese ran for and was elected to be Majority Whip in the House. He resigned from his leadership role after he was indicted on charges unrelated to the issues at the center of the Bonusgate case.

Despite this reduced role in the Democratic caucus, the Pennsylvania Report expected DeWeese to "find some way to exert his influence and thus continue to be a power player and force behind-the-scenes in the PA House" and cautioned against anyone counting him out.

On February 6, 2012, a jury found DeWeese guilty of five of the six felony counts with which he was charged, including three counts of theft, one count of conflict of interest and one count of conspiracy. He was acquitted on a single theft charge. After the verdict was delivered, DeWeese maintained the charges were politically motivated, and vowed to remain in the House until he was sentenced, at which time he said he would resign.

DeWeese was the only Democrat to file for election to his House seat, and a Commonwealth Court judge ruled that his name could remain on the April 2012 primary ballot. He was sentenced to 30 to 60 months in state prison on April 24, 2012, the same day in which he resigned his House seat. His subsequent requests to be released on bail pending appeal were denied by the State Supreme Court, and he was incarcerated at the Camp Hill State Prison.

In August 2012, a Commonwealth Court judge ruled in favor of State Democrats who had sought to have DeWeese's name removed from the general election ballot; the ruling allowed Democrats to select a new candidate to take DeWeese's place on the ballot. DeWeese was paroled on March 30, 2014.

== Feud with Corbett ==
DeWeese maintained that his charges were part of a political vendetta by Republican Attorney General Tom Corbett, who indicted DeWeese while running for Governor. Corbett won the governor's race through an anti-corruption platform despite allegations of prosecutorial misconduct and corruption in Corbett's office.

A key source of dispute between Corbett and DeWeese is the exploration for natural gas in Marcellus Shale, a booming industry in DeWeese's district. Between 2005 and 2010, more than 1,900 wells had been drilled in Pennsylvania. Greene County, home of DeWeese, has attracted companies as large as Haliburton. Corbett, the former assistant General Counsel of Waste Management, opposes an extraction tax on Marcellus Shale drilling while DeWeese favors it. Corbett also sought to limit regulatory oversight of the drilling industry.

Corbett's campaign was heavily funded by energy insiders. He received more than $1 million in campaign contributions from the natural gas industry.

In August 2011, DeWeese called for a theft-of-services investigation of Tom Corbett when the wife of a Corbett cabinet member was charged with DUI and called the Governor's mansion in the early morning hours to assist. A State Trooper was dispatched to pick her up from the police station and drive her home.

In January 2012, DeWeese lambasted Corbett for spending tens of millions of state dollars pursuing political enemies but ignoring the child abuse allegations against Jerry Sandusky; Corbett had received $201,783.64 in campaign contributions from past and present board members of Sandusky's charity, according to media reports.

As part of the ongoing feud, Corbett also canceled a prison destined for DeWeese's district.

== Speech ==
DeWeese is well known for his idiosyncratic style of speaking and writing, which incorporates an extensive vocabulary, anachronistic usages, and attenuated metaphors. For instance, a 2002 letter by DeWeese to lobbyist Stephen Wojdak regarding Wojdak's hiring of DeWeese's ex-wife, Holly Kinser, began with the following paragraph:

Let's cut to the chase ... you sir, are a liar. The measure of the person in our enterprise is his word. When a man comes to my Capitol Hill enclave and stands beneath that impressive chandelier of gold, looks me in the eye with a gimlet gaze, shakes my hand with a sturdy grip and gives me his word, to me it's axiomatic that the gentleman is telling the truth. You are an abject, ignoble, mendacious knave!

In 2002, the political website PoliticsPA named him to the list of "Smartest Legislators. ... His command of the English language leaves most people fumbling for a dictionary, if they can even spell the word. The breadth and depth of his knowledge of history also distinguishes this Democratic Floor Leader. Extremely well rounded and well read, DeWeese is capable of holding an intelligent conversation on just about any topic." In a 2002 PoliticsPA feature story designating politicians with yearbook superlatives, he was named the "Best Dressed."

Political offices
Preceded by Bob O'Donnell	Speaker of the Pennsylvania House of Representatives; 1993–1994	Succeeded by Matt Ryan
Pennsylvania House of Representatives
Preceded by Donald Davis	Member of the Pennsylvania House of Representatives for the 50th District; 1976–2012	Succeeded by Pam Snyder
Party political offices
Preceded by Keith McCall	Democratic Whip of the Pennsylvania House of Representatives; 2009	Succeeded by Frank Dermody
Preceded by Ivan Itkin	Democratic Leader of the Pennsylvania House of Representatives; 1995–2008	Succeeded by Todd Eachus
Preceded by Bob O'Donnell	Democratic Leader of the Pennsylvania House of Representatives; 1990–1992	Succeeded by Ivan Itkin
Preceded by Bob O'Donnell	Democratic Whip of the Pennsylvania House of Representatives; 1989–1990	Succeeded by Ivan Itkin
