= Harry Jannotti =

American politician

Member of the Philadelphia City Council from the 7th District
- In office January 5, 1970 – January 2, 1984
- Preceded by: Joseph J. Hersch
- Succeeded by: Patricia Hughes

Personal details
- Born: June 18, 1924
- Died: September 3, 1998 (aged 74) Philadelphia, Pennsylvania
- Party: Democratic
- Spouse: Jeane Groesbeck
- Children: Four
- Education: Temple University

Harry P. Jannotti (June 18, 1924 – September 3, 1998) was a Democratic politician who served as a member of the Philadelphia City Council.

== Early life ==
Jannotti graduated from Northeast High School, and attended Temple University. Before running for office, he worked as chief deputy clerk to the City Council for several years.

== Political career ==
=== City Council ===
A protégé of Councilman George Schwartz, Jannotti was first recruited to run in 1969 for the Seventh District seat vacated by Joseph J. Hersch. He was elected successfully by defeating challengers such as Frank Talent, and steadily gained power over the ensuing decade. By the late 1970s, both Jannotti and Schwartz were at the height of their power. Schwartz had been elected Council President, while Jannotti was the council's Majority Leader, Chairman of its Finance Committee, and Vice Chairman of its Rules and Appropriations Committee. Additionally, he was a member of the City Gas Commission and head the city's gift property program, through which abandoned homes were given to low-income people to renovate and live in. Jannotti had also been elected leader of the Democratic City Committee's 19th Ward, and ran his political operation out of a tavern he owned.

==== Abscam involvement ====
In 1980, Jannotti met with two men at a suite at the Barclay Hotel in Rittenhouse Square. The men claimed to represent an Arab Sheikh who was interested in building a hotel in Philadelphia. The men, who were actually FBI agents, agreed to pay Jannotti $10,000 in exchange for his use of his influence over Council to get the project approved. The scandal would later come to be known as "Abscam" (short for Arab Scam), and would take-down five Congressman, including First District Congressman Ozzie Myers, who would become the first member of the House to be expelled since the Civil War, and two other members of City Council–Schwartz and Louis Johanson.

Jannotti was indicted on charges of accepting a bribe, extortion and conspiracy on May 23, 1980. Both Jannotti and Schwartz initially claimed that they were entrapped into taking the bribes. Indeed, the Abscam investigation would later come under criticism for excess involvement by government agents seeking to push bribes on public officials. Both men were initially convicted of the charges against them, but later had their convictions overturned by the District Court, which agreed with their assertion that they were entrapped. However, the Appellate Court later reversed the District Court's decision and reinstated the verdicts. The case finally reached the Supreme Court in mid-1982, and in the first high court ruling on Abscam, the court concurred with the Appellate Court's findings and let the convictions stand.

Both men began serving their sentences in Federal Prison on April 22, 1985. Jannotti had been sentenced to six months in prison and fined $2,000. He would serve close to five months of the sentence, during which time he was incarcerated in Allenwood Federal Prison in Gregg Township, Union County.

== Later life ==
Unlike Schwartz, who quickly resigned both as Council President, and later as a member of Council altogether, Jannotti held his seat until his term expired in 1984, despite objections from several of his colleagues, including John Street. He was instrumental in getting his longtime administrative aide, Patricia Hughes, elected to succeed him in 1983. After he was released from prison, Jannotti, again unlike Schwartz, attempted a political comeback. He was again elected leader of the 19th Ward, and once again ran his operation out of his tavern.

However, his political comeback began to unravel in 1987. That year, he sought to return to City Council, and once again represent the Seventh District. Hughes, however, decided to seek re-election. Further, she sought to block Jannotti's name from even appearing on the ballot, citing a provision in the State Constitution that prohibits anyone convicted of "infamous crimes" from holding "any office of trust or profit." One day before the Democratic primary, the State Supreme Court ordered Jannotti's name be removed from the ballot. Hughes went on to lose the general election to Republican Jack Kelly. A year later, Jannotti lost his ward leadership post to State Representative Ralph Acosta, a loss some attributed to the increasing Hispanic population of the 19th Ward. Jannotti died of cancer ten years later.

Philadelphia City Council
Preceded by Joseph J. Hersch	Member of the Philadelphia City Council for the 7th District; 1970–1984	Succeeded by Patricia Hughes
