= Leslie Gromis-Baker =

American fundraiser

- Occupation: political consultant

Leslie Gromis-Baker is an American politician. She is a Republican fundraiser and political aide in Pennsylvania. She is considered "one of the state’s most sought after properties."

Gromis-Baker was Pennsylvania state political director for George W. Bush. She first rose to prominence as political director for Pennsylvania Governor Tom Ridge. In 2010, Politics Magazine named her one of the most influential Republicans in Pennsylvania.

Gromis-Baker served as a top aide for Bill Scranton's 2006 campaign for Pennsylvania Governor.

In 2004, she became a partner and senior advisor for BrabenderCox.

Gromis-Baker and John Brabender developed a politically themed television program, "Moving Numbers."
