= Brabender =

Brabender is a surname. Notable people with the surname include:

- Gene Brabender (1941–1996), American baseball player
- Wayne Brabender (born 1945), American-Spanish basketball player and coach
- John Brabender, American political consultant

== See also ==
- Brabender plastograph, a device for the continuous observation of torque in the shearing of a polymer
