= David Oh =

American lawyer (born 1960)

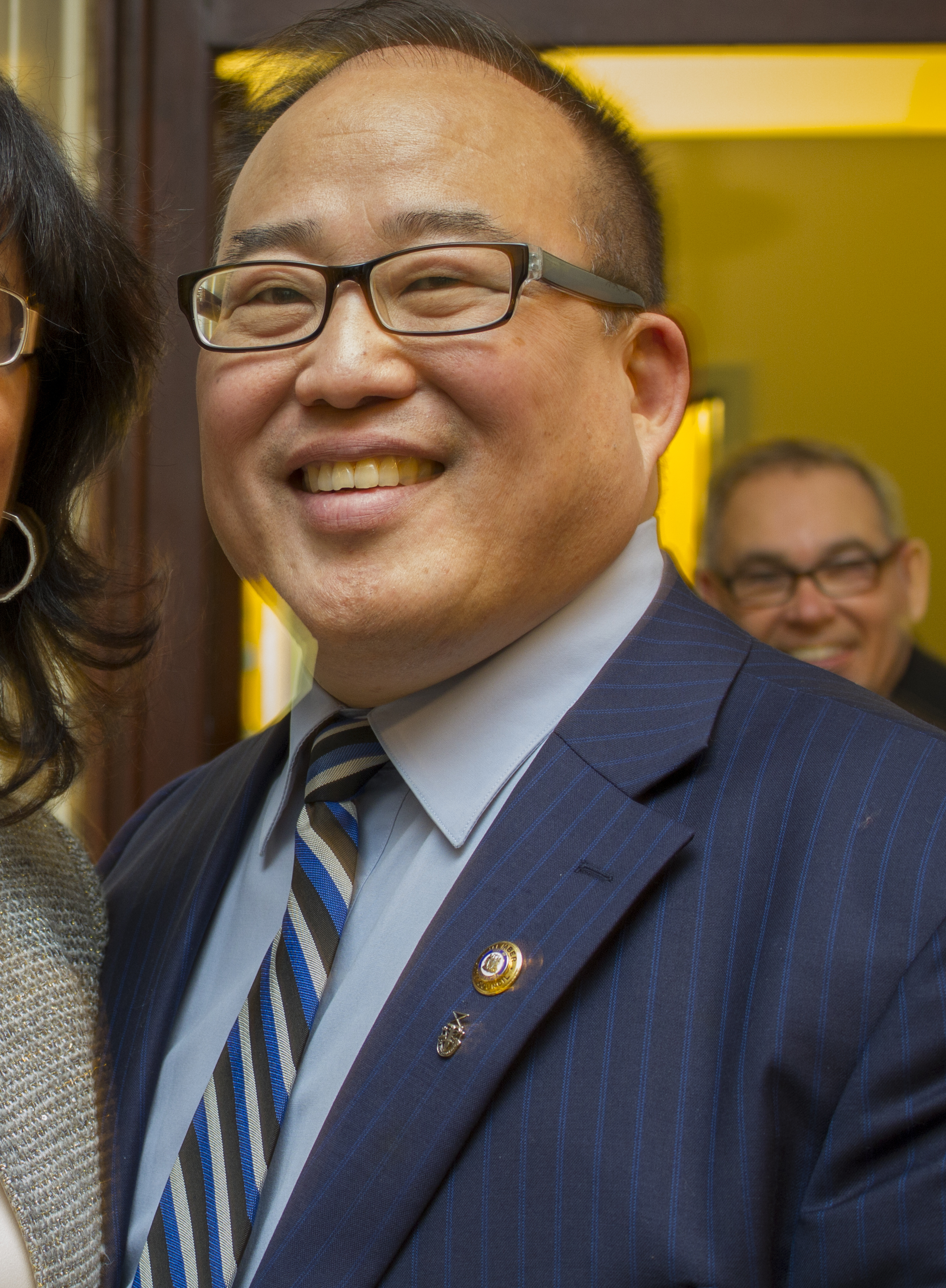
- Oh in 2016

Member of the Philadelphia City Council from the at-large district
- In office January 2, 2012 – February 13, 2023
- Preceded by: Jack Kelly
- Succeeded by: Nicolas O'Rourke

Personal details
- Born: David Henry Oh; March 8, 1960 (age 66) Philadelphia, Pennsylvania, U.S.
- Party: Republican
- Spouse: Heesun
- Children: 4
- Education: Dickinson College (BA); Rutgers University–Camden (JD)
- Website: Campaign website

Military service
- Allegiance: United States
- Branch/service: United States Army
- Years of service: 1988–1992
- Rank: Second Lieutenant
- Unit: Army National Guard

Korean name
- Hangul: 오승호
- RR: O Seungho
- MR: O Sŭngho

David Henry Oh (Korean: 오승호; born March 8, 1960) is an American attorney and politician who served as a Republican member of the Philadelphia City Council from 2012 to 2023. He was the first Asian American and Korean American elected to the city council. Oh was the Republican nominee in the 2023 Philadelphia mayoral election.

== Early life and education ==
Oh was born in Philadelphia on March 8, 1960, the son of Korean immigrants. He grew up in Cobbs Creek. His father, Ki Hang Oh (Korean: 오기항), was the founder and pastor of the first Korean American church in Philadelphia.

Oh graduated from Dickinson College and Rutgers Law School. He became a member of the Pennsylvania Bar Association in 1985.

== Career ==
After graduating from law school, Oh worked for three years as an Assistant District Attorney in Philadelphia. He resigned to join the U.S. Army in 1988 and served until 1992 as a 2nd lieutenant in the Army National Guard. He returned to Philadelphia and opened a solo law firm. In 2008, he merged his firm with Zarwin Baum DeVito Kaplan Schaer Toddy, P.C.

Prior to running for office, Oh worked for Mayor Ed Rendell's transition team as well as on Governor Tom Ridge's trade mission to South Korea.

=== Philadelphia City Council ===
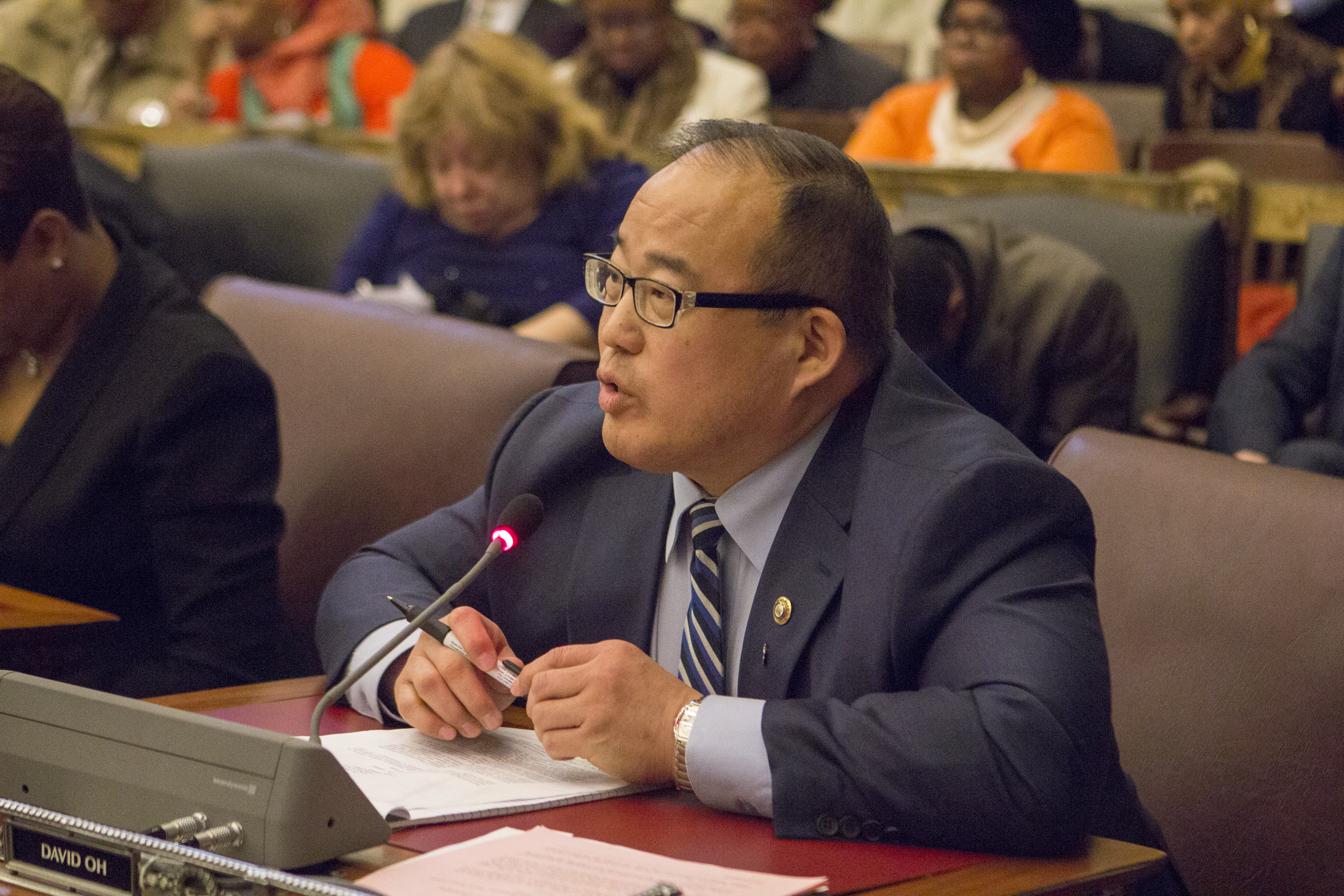
Oh at a Philadelphia City Council Stated Meeting in 2016

In 2003 and 2007, Oh ran unsuccessful campaigns to win one of the two minority party at-large seats for the Philadelphia City Council. In both elections, he was defeated by Jack Kelly and Frank Rizzo Jr.

In 2011, Oh ran again. Kelly did not run for reelection, and Rizzo was defeated in the Republican primary. In the general election, state representative Denny O'Brien received the most votes for Republican candidates to take one of the at-large seats, and Oh narrowly defeated former mayoral candidate Al Taubenberger for the final seat. Oh was the first Asian American to be elected to the city council. After his election, he was selected as minority whip.

Oh was reelected to the council in 2015. During the primary campaign for his reelection, he took an illegal $20,000 campaign donation while advising the donor how to avoid campaign finance laws. He returned the money and was fined $2,000 for the violation. In addition, Oh had three of his city employees fined for working on his reelection campaign while on city time. After an investigation by the Philadelphia Board of Ethics, the employees were fined a combined $3,300. Although council employees are prohibited from political fundraising, many violations involved working on fundraising events for Oh.

In 2015, Oh helped raise money for a statue commemorating William "Wild Bill" Guarnere, a World War II veteran.

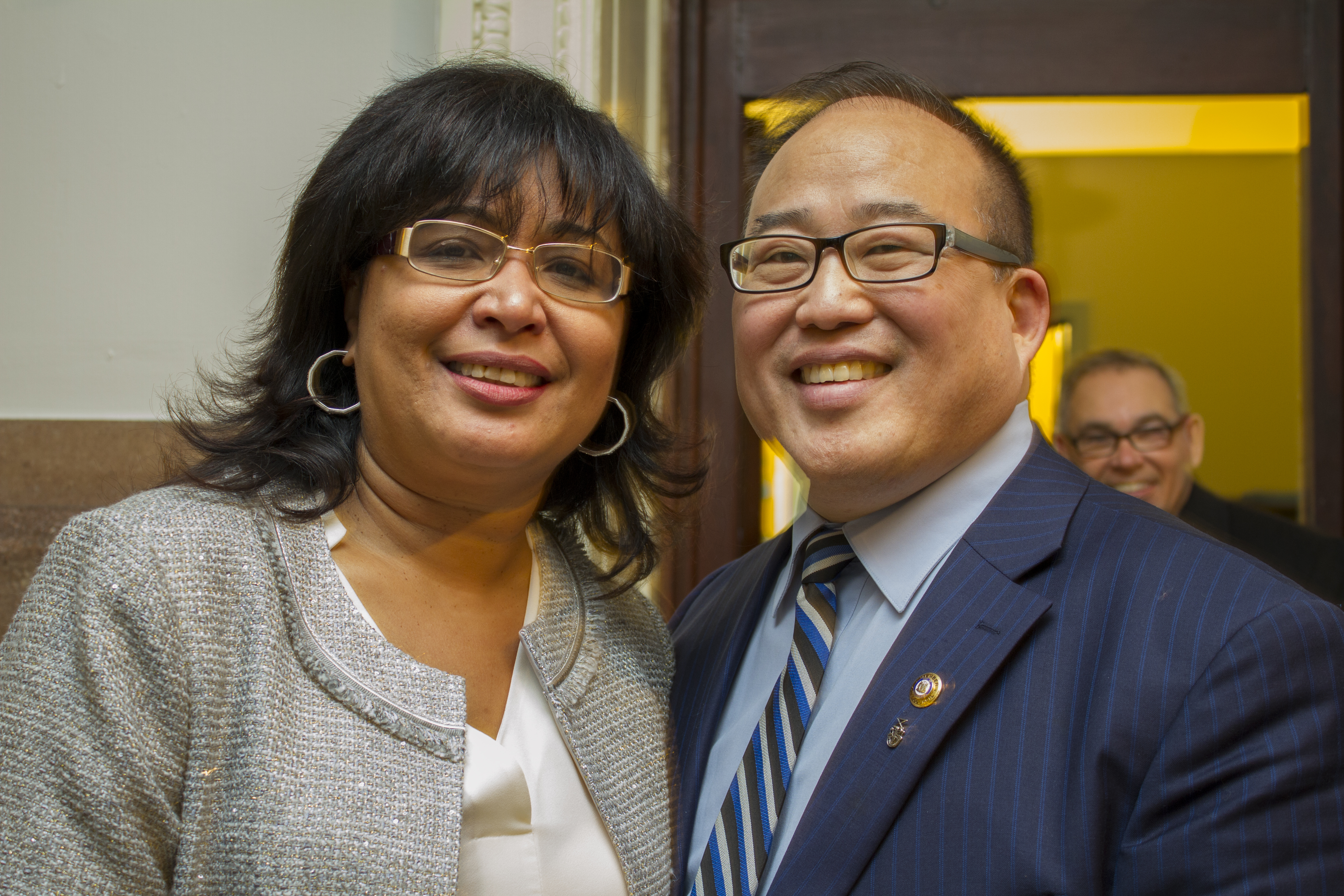
Oh and councilwoman Maria Quiñones-Sánchez

In 2016, Oh organized the first annual First Responder Appreciation Day, which honors police, firefighters, and paramedic units. He also traveled to South Korea to discuss investment opportunities in Philadelphia with representatives of the South Korean government and business sectors. He had previously hosted South Korean officials in 2012 to "promote Philadelphia as a globally competitive city."

In 2017, Oh introduced a resolution to honor Philadelphia native Kevin Hart by designating July 6, 2017, as "Kevin Hart Day" in Philadelphia. Hundreds of people, including Hart, attended the celebration, which included a mural dedication at Max's Steaks in North Philadelphia.

In 2023, Oh resigned from the city council to run for Mayor of Philadelphia.

==== Military service controversy ====
During the 2011 campaign, the Philadelphia Daily News reported that Oh had falsely claimed to have served as a Green Beret in the U.S. Army Special Forces during his three campaigns for city council. Oh responded that he did wear a green beret in the Special Forces Group of the Maryland National Guard but did not complete full Special Forces training. After facing criticism from veterans, he apologized for overstating his military credentials.

=== Mayoral campaign ===
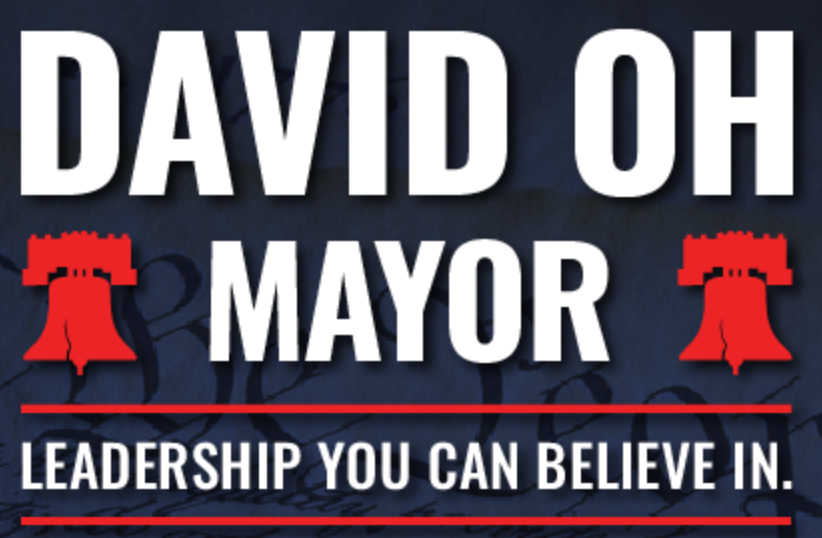
Oh's 2023 Mayoral campaign logo

On February 13, 2023, Oh resigned his seat in the City Council to be the sole Republican candidate for the 2023 Philadelphia mayoral election, winning the Philadelphia Republican Party endorsement at his announcement and winning the nomination unopposed on May 16. During his campaign announcement Oh stated that he had exhausted all possible avenues of reform on the City Council and that he will "take all the things I could not do on council and do that for the city as mayor." Oh called himself the "first credible [Republican] candidate in 20 years" and touted his experience winning elections to the city council in his hope to snap a 70-year Republican losing streak for mayor, and become the city's first Asian American mayor.

Oh's platform was built off a law and order message, stating that political interference and movements to defund the police have made Philadelphia unsafe, citing his own stabbing in 2017. However, Oh was a supporter of minimal force policing and is opposed to stop and frisk policies. Oh stated that his main priorities if elected mayor were to "make Philadelphia safe, create good jobs and provide quality schools in every neighborhood." Oh branded himself as a non-partisan reformer, citing his frequent clashes with the city's Republican party and leadership, and also his desire to improve the standard of living and function of the city government.

Oh faced off against Democratic candidate Cherelle Parker, with Oh's campaign focusing mostly on Parker's refusal to engage with him. Parker did not campaign for almost a month after winning the crowded Democratic primary, citing complications to an earlier root canal treatment. After recovering, Parker has refused to debate Oh, claiming that the 7 to 1 voter registration advantage the Democrats had made any effort to interact with Oh a waste of campaign resources. Jennifer Stefano of The Philadelphia Inquirer called Parker's move to cut out Oh "Trumpesque" and "a danger to our democracy." In the five elections since 2003, where the Republicans never got more than 21.7% of the vote, there had always been a debate between the Republican and Democratic candidate.

Oh and Parker saw the stage for the first time at a joint interview at the Please Touch Museum where the pair took questions from a gallery of children from various elementary schools in Philadelphia. Shortly afterwards Parker backtracked and agreed to face off against Oh at a single debate on October 26 on KYW's Philadelphia’s Morning News. As of September 27, Oh has raised $467,000 compared to the $875,000 Parker raised after the primaries. Oh has also reinforced his position as a voice for Philadelphia's ethnic minorities.

Oh's mayoral campaign has been haunted by his lingering Green Beret controversy, with Oh stating during an interview during the race that "I did serve in the Special Forces. I did serve in the Green Berets, the issue is that I was not Special Forces-qualified at the time." The Guardians of the Green Beret, a veterans organization for former Green Berets, took offense to Oh's statement and resurrected the issue in Philadelphia media. Oh argued that prior to a change in Army uniforms in 1993, anyone who wore a green colored Beret was in the special forces, so when he wore one in 2011 he believed himself to be in the Green Berets and apologized for the confusion.

The Associated Press called the election in favor of Parker as soon as the polls closed, and Oh conceded the race shortly before 11pm. With over 90% of the votes counted before midnight, Oh had 25.6% to Parker's 74.4%. Although this was the best Republican showing since the 2003 Philadelphia mayoral election, Oh's performance fell well below expectations he set out at the start of his campaign.

=== Asian American Chamber of Commerce for Greater Philadelphia ===
In February 2024, Oh was named the new president and CEO of the Asian American Chamber of Commerce for Greater Philadelphia. Oh was involved in the negotiations of Hanwha Group's purchase of the Philly Shipyard from the Aker Group.

== Personal life ==
Oh lives in Southwest Philadelphia with his wife, Heesun, and their four children.

In the 1990s, Oh was arrested on gun charges and was found not guilty in a non-jury trial in 1995.

On May 31, 2017, Oh was stabbed in an attempted robbery outside his home while unloading groceries from his car. He underwent emergency surgery at Penn Presbyterian Medical Center. A 24-year-old African American man was identified by Oh in a photo lineup and charged with attempted murder. After 10 months in jail, the man was found not guilty due to a lack of evidence to corroborate Oh's testimony.

== See also ==
- List of members of Philadelphia City Council since 1952
