= Al Taubenberger =

American politician and businessman

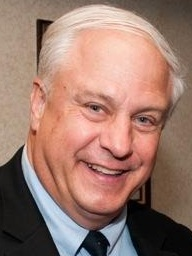
- Taubenberger in 2011

Member of the Philadelphia City Council at-large
- In office January 4, 2016 – January 6, 2020
- Preceded by: Dennis M. O'Brien
- Succeeded by: Kendra Brooks

Personal details
- Born: August 18, 1953 (age 73) Philadelphia, Pennsylvania, U.S.
- Party: Republican
- Spouse: Joanne Brenner
- Children: 4
- Education: Northeast High School Penn State University
- Occupation: President, Greater Northeast Philadelphia Chamber of Commerce
- Website: Al For Council

Alfred W. Taubenberger (born 18 August 1953) is an American politician and businessman. A member of the Republican Party, he served as an at-large member of the Philadelphia City Council from 2016 to 2020.

== Greater Northeast Philadelphia Chamber of Commerce ==
Taubenberger was President of the Greater Northeast Philadelphia Chamber of Commerce from 1991 to 2015.

== Political career ==
Taubenberger later held staff jobs for Republican Congressman Charles F. Dougherty in the early 1980s and later for two City Council members, Democrat Joan Krajewski and Republican Jack Kelly. Taubenberger worked as Councilman Kelly's chief-of-staff, was vice-chair of the Philadelphia Tax Reform Commission, member of the Philadelphia Zoning Code Commission, administrator of the Philadelphia City Council Republican Caucus, and ran the district office of U.S. Rep. Charles F. Dougherty. but also had a dual title as the administrator of the Philadelphia City Council Republican Caucus. in 1980, Dougherty promoted him to the Director of Constituent Relations, where Taubenberger supervised 3 offices and 12 people. Following his time with Dougherty's office, he joined the Mid-Atlantic Trade Adjustment Assistance Center, a program of the United States Department of Commerce. The program was designed to help American companies which were adversely affected by foreign import competition. Under Councilwoman Joan Krajewski, he was the Administrator Secretary for City Council's Economic Development Committee. In addition, Taubenberger served as the Business Liaison for Councilwoman Krajewski's office.

In 2002 and 2004 Taubenberger ran for Pennsylvania's 13th congressional district. Both times, he was defeated in the primary election by Melissa Brown.

In 2007, Taubenberger ran for mayor of Philadelphia against Michael Nutter. Taubenberger was defeated by the a then-record margin in Mayoral history - losing 82.52% to 17.07%. After the election, Mayor Nutter appointed Taubenberger to the newly formed bipartisan Philadelphia Jobs Commission.

In 2011, Taubenberger ran for an at-large seat on City Council. In the general election, Taubenberger finished narrowly behind David Oh losing by 203 votes for the final at-large City Council seat. Taubenberger earned 6,606 more votes than Oh in Northeast Philadelphia's 14 wards but Oh made up the deficit in North Philadelphia and West Philadelphia.

In 2012, Taubenberger ran for PA Representative and was defeated by a margin of 67.87% to 32.09% to the incumbent Kevin J. Boyle.

In 2015, Taubenberger ran for an at-large seat on City Council. The city council has seven at-large seats, only five of which may be held by the majority party (the Democrats). He faced a field of five Republicans, which included incumbents Dennis M. O'Brien and David Oh, and four candidates from smaller parties. With nearly 99 percent of the ballots counted, Oh and Taubenberger were declared the winners of the two seats.

== Personal life ==
The child of German parents who immigrated from Germany in the 1930s, Taubenberger was raised in Northeast Philadelphia in the Burholme neighborhood. He has been married twice and has 4 children. Three of his children were born from his first marriage with Barbara Muller. He currently resides in the Fox Chase, Philadelphia neighborhood with his second wife, Joanne Brenner Taubenberger and their son William. They are parishioners of Saint Cecilia Parish. Taubenberger is a cousin to world-renowned virologist Jeffery Taubenberger, of Washington, D.C., is Chief of the Viral Pathogenesis and Evolution Section, Laboratory of Infectious Diseases, National Institute of Allergy and Infectious Diseases and National Institutes of Health.
