= Joan Specter =

American politician (1934–2024)

Member of the Philadelphia City Council from the at-large district
- In office January 7, 1980 – January 8, 1996
- Preceded by: Ethel D. Allen
- Succeeded by: Frank Rizzo Jr.

Personal details
- Born: Joan Levy; March 5, 1934 Philadelphia, Pennsylvania, U.S.
- Died: June 29, 2024 (aged 90) Haverford, Pennsylvania, U.S.
- Party: Republican
- Spouse: Arlen Specter (m. 1953; died 2012)
- Children: 2
- Education: Southern Connecticut College; Drexel University

Joan Levy Specter (March 5, 1934 – June 29, 2024) was an American businesswoman and politician. She was a member of the Philadelphia City Council, and the widow of U.S. Senator Arlen Specter.

== Professional career ==
Specter held a BA from Southern Connecticut College and an MA in food and design from Drexel University. Upon her graduation from Drexel, she founded several cooking schools in the Philadelphia-area. In the 1970s, she hosted a consumer advice and food-related program on a local radio station, and wrote a weekly column for the Philadelphia Bulletin. Specter also began selling her pies to local restaurants. Eventually, the business grew into a wholesale distribution company which operated in several dozen states. Specter's pies were billed as "America's first gourmet frozen pies which require no baking, decorating or special preparations".

== Political career ==
Specter left the business world in 1979, when she was elected to one of the two allotted minority Republican Party at-large seats on the Philadelphia City Council. She was re-elected three more times, though she finished third in the 1991 primary, behind her colleague on Council, W. Thacher Longstreth and Joseph Egan Jr. However, prior to the general election, former Democratic Mayor Frank Rizzo, who had switched to the Republican Party and was its nominee in that year's Mayoral election, died. Egan was subsequently selected to take Rizzo's spot on the ballot (and lost to former District Attorney Ed Rendell), and Longstreth and Specter were both re-elected.

In 1995, she and Longstreth were challenged by two high-profile Republicans–Rizzo's son, Frank Jr. and former Congressman Charles Dougherty.

== Personal life and death ==
Specter was married to her husband, Arlen, from 1953 until his death in 2012. The couple had two sons. She resided in Haverford, Pennsylvania. She was Jewish.

Specter died from complications from dementia on June 29, 2024, at the age of 90.
