= Keith R. McCall =

American politician

Member of the Pennsylvania House of Representatives from the 122nd district
- In office 1982–2010
- Preceded by: Thomas McCall
- Succeeded by: Doyle Heffley

138th Speaker of the Pennsylvania House of Representatives
- In office January 6, 2009 – November 30, 2010
- Preceded by: Dennis O'Brien
- Succeeded by: Sam Smith

Democratic Whip of the Pennsylvania House of Representatives
- In office January 2, 2007 – November 30, 2008
- Preceded by: Mike Veon
- Succeeded by: Bill DeWeese

Personal details
- Born: December 16, 1959 (age 66) Coaldale, Pennsylvania
- Party: Democratic
- Spouse: Betty McCall
- Relations: Thomas J. McCall (father)
- Children: Courtney McCall, Keith McCall II
- Education: Penn State University; Harrisburg Area Community College

Keith R. McCall (born December 16, 1959) is a former Democratic member of the Pennsylvania House of Representatives who represented the 122nd District from 1982 to 2011. He served as the Speaker of the House during the 2009–2010 legislative session.

== Biography ==
McCall was elected in 1982 at the age of 22 to replace his late father Thomas McCall, who represented the district from 1975 until his death in 1981. He was re-elected to nine succeeding sessions of the House. He served several terms as Democratic chairman of the House Transportation Committee before being elected majority whip for the 2007–08 session. In 2003, the political website PoliticsPA named him as a possible successor to House Minority Leader Bill DeWeese.

McCall announced in 2008 that he would run for Speaker of the Pennsylvania House of Representatives seeking to replace Republican Dennis O'Brien, whom the Democratic-controlled House elected as a compromise candidate in 2007. Democratic majority leader and former speaker Bill DeWeese endorsed McCall for the post and the House Democratic caucus nominated him for speaker in November 2008. The Pennsylvania House of Representatives elected McCall speaker on Jan. 6, 2009. The Pennsylvania Report credited his "moderate legislative record and impressive behind the scenes legislative abilities" for his election to the speakership. He has a wife Betty Wehr and 2 children, Courtney 24, and Keith Robert 22.
