= Gerald Kaufman (Pennsylvania politician) =

American politician (1932–2025)

Member of the Pennsylvania House of Representatives from the 23rd district
- In office January 7, 1969 – November 30, 1972
- Preceded by: District created
- Succeeded by: Ivan Itkin

Member of the Pennsylvania House of Representatives from the Allegheny County district
- In office 1967–1968

Personal details
- Born: June 14, 1932 Pittsburgh, Pennsylvania, U.S.
- Died: May 10, 2025 (aged 92) Philadelphia, Pennsylvania, U.S.
- Party: Democratic

Gerald Kaufman (June 14, 1932 – May 10, 2025) was an American politician who was a Democratic member of the Pennsylvania House of Representatives. Kaufman, from Squirrel Hill, served in the house for three terms, sat on committees working on issues of education, industrial development, health and welfare, and chaired the Welfare Subcommittee of the Appropriations Committee. During his time in the house, Kaufman was known as a "champion of liberal and consumer legislation."

Kaufman died on May 10, 2025, at the age of 92. He was Jewish.
