= 2007 Philadelphia mayoral election =

- November 6, 2007
- Turnout: 29% ▼10 pp
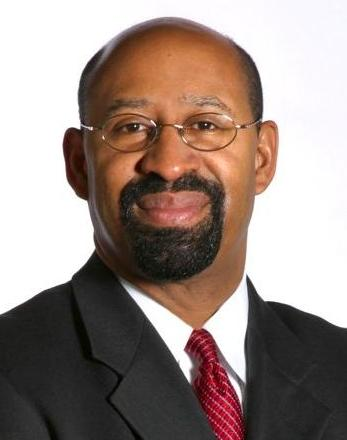

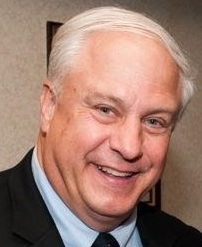
Nominee	Michael Nutter	Al Taubenberger
Party	Democratic	Republican
Popular vote	227,090	46,984
Percentage	82.52%	17.07%
- Nutter: 50–60% 60–70% 70–80% 80–90% >90% Taubenberger: 50–60% 60–70% Tie: 50% No votes
Mayor before election
John F. Street
Democratic
Elected mayor
Michael Nutter
Democratic

The 2007 Philadelphia mayoral election was held on November 6, 2007 when Philadelphia, Pennsylvania, United States elected Michael Nutter as the Mayor of Philadelphia starting in 2008. The incumbent mayor, John F. Street was barred from seeking a third term because of term limits. The Democratic Party primary campaign saw two well-known, well-funded Philadelphia congressmen – Bob Brady and Chaka Fattah – eclipsed by self-funding businessman Tom Knox and reformist former Philadelphia City Council member Nutter, who won by a surprisingly large margin in the primary election on May 15. He went on to face Republican Party nominee Al Taubenberger in the general election, which he won by a large margin and with the lowest voter turnout in a Philadelphia mayoral election without an incumbent since 1951. Mayor Nutter was sworn in on January 7, 2008.

== Background ==
The 2007 Philadelphia mayoral election was held to select the replacement for incumbent Mayor John F. Street, who was prevented from being re-elected a third time by term limits. Nearly four out of five Philadelphia voters are registered Democrats and the city has not elected a Republican mayor in close to sixty years.

=== Issues ===
The two major issues in the mayoral campaign were crime and corruption. Philadelphians felt crime was the most important issue because of the city's rising murder rate. There were more than 400 murders in 2006, the most in almost a decade. Corruption was also an important issue. A corruption probe resulted in the conviction a close to two dozen people, some with close ties to Mayor John F. Street. An early poll on issues concerning young adults, crime was the number one issue with public transit, economic development, education and job growth rounding out the top five.

== Democratic primary ==
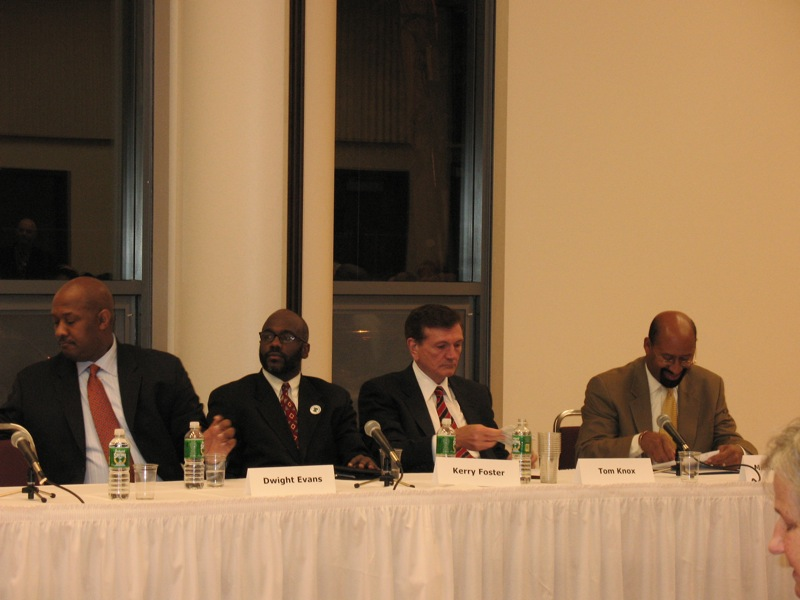
January 2007 mayoral candidate forum

Philadelphia City Council member Michael Nutter won the Democratic mayoral primary on May 15. His opponent, businessman Tom Knox came in second, with congressmen Bob Brady and Chaka Fattah and State Representative Dwight Evans coming in third, fourth, and fifth respectively.

Businessman Tom Knox had started off strong as his self-financed campaign created a barrage of advertising. However, Nutter's message of government reform and criticism of mayor Street gained him enough support to win the primary.

=== Polling ===
Opinion Polls
Candidate	Jan 31	Feb 15	March 13	April 5	April 17	May 1	May 14
Bob Brady	8%	18%	17%	16%	17%	11%	13%
Dwight Evans	10%	10%	13%	10%	10%	9%	6%
Chaka Fattah	26%	32%	22%	17%	18%	18%	13%
Tom Knox	22%	22%	25%	24%	32%	29%	25%
Michael Nutter	12%	8%	11%	12%	14%	27%	36%
Undecided	22%			21%			
Source	Keystone Poll	SurveyUSA	SurveyUSA	Keystone Poll	SurveyUSA	SurveyUSA	SurveyUSA
Link							

=== Results ===
Democratic primary results by ward Nutter: 20%–30%; 30%–40%; 40%–50%; 50%–60%; 60%–70%; 70%–80%; Knox: 20%–30%; 30%–40%; 40%–50%; 50%–60%; 60%–70%; Brady: 30%–40%; 40%–50%; Evans: 40%–50%

Democratic primary results
Party	Candidate	Votes	%
Democratic	Michael Nutter	106,805	36.64
Democratic	Tom Knox	71,731	24.61
Democratic	Bob Brady	44,474	15.26
Democratic	Chaka Fattah	44,301	15.20
Democratic	Dwight Evans	22,782	7.82
Democratic	Queena Bass	950	0.33
Democratic	Jesus White	437	0.15
Democratic	Write-in	12	0.00
Total votes		291,492	100.00

Results by ward

Ward	Nutter		Knox		Brady		Fattah		Evans		Bass		White		Total votes
Ward	#	%	#	%	#	%	#	%	#	%	#	%	#	%	Total votes
1	1,099	29.37%	1,206	32.23%	1,253	33.48%	114	3.05%	59	1.58%	6	0.16%	5	0.13%	3,742
2	3,095	57.06%	1,095	20.19%	775	14.29%	332	6.12%	118	2.18%	7	0.13%	2	0.04%	5,424
3	1,966	38.59%	832	16.33%	418	8.20%	1,400	27.48%	457	8.97%	17	0.33%	5	0.10%	5,095
4	1,675	34.79%	634	13.17%	561	11.65%	1,665	34.58%	253	5.25%	21	0.44%	6	0.12%	4,815
5	4,541	70.40%	1,108	17.18%	316	4.90%	293	4.54%	179	2.78%	3	0.05%	10	0.16%	6,450
6	971	34.87%	461	16.55%	362	13.00%	839	30.13%	136	4.88%	10	0.36%	6	0.22%	2,785
7	328	15.11%	1,180	54.35%	475	21.88%	122	5.62%	43	1.98%	15	0.69%	8	0.37%	2,171
8	5,073	71.65%	1,155	16.31%	296	4.18%	338	4.77%	199	2.81%	11	0.16%	8	0.11%	7,080
9	3,829	74.80%	486	9.49%	138	2.70%	401	7.83%	255	4.98%	6	0.12%	4	0.08%	5,119
10	1,915	25.82%	650	8.76%	293	3.95%	1,166	15.72%	3,367	45.40%	18	0.24%	7	0.09%	7,416
11	907	28.41%	513	16.07%	456	14.28%	903	28.28%	374	11.71%	29	0.91%	11	0.34%	3,193
12	1,933	39.07%	711	14.37%	310	6.27%	1,209	24.44%	742	15.00%	32	0.65%	10	0.20%	4,947
13	1,618	34.54%	694	14.81%	467	9.97%	1,333	28.45%	530	11.31%	34	0.73%	9	0.19%	4,685
14	533	30.90%	341	19.77%	247	14.32%	418	24.23%	166	9.62%	15	0.87%	5	0.29%	1,725
15	3,042	66.00%	765	16.60%	355	7.70%	290	6.29%	146	3.17%	6	0.13%	5	0.11%	4,609
16	806	30.02%	520	19.37%	217	8.08%	683	25.44%	432	16.09%	17	0.63%	10	0.37%	2,685
17	1,958	32.88%	810	13.60%	364	6.11%	1,372	23.04%	1,404	23.58%	31	0.52%	16	0.27%	5,955
18	858	30.85%	946	34.02%	752	27.04%	148	5.32%	66	2.37%	7	0.25%	4	0.14%	2,781
19	266	11.91%	1,445	64.68%	283	12.67%	158	7.07%	58	2.60%	13	0.58%	11	0.49%	2,234
20	479	32.67%	269	18.35%	114	7.78%	397	27.08%	200	13.64%	5	0.34%	2	0.14%	1,466
21	5,241	59.01%	2,078	23.40%	975	10.98%	387	4.36%	189	2.13%	7	0.08%	5	0.06%	8,882
22	4,208	55.69%	675	8.93%	281	3.72%	1,450	19.19%	916	12.12%	18	0.24%	8	0.11%	7,556
23	926	28.49%	972	29.91%	738	22.71%	425	13.08%	176	5.42%	11	0.34%	2	0.06%	3,250
24	964	39.49%	461	18.89%	206	8.44%	658	26.96%	134	5.49%	14	0.57%	4	0.16%	2,441
25	461	18.61%	1,010	40.78%	828	33.43%	125	5.05%	39	1.57%	8	0.32%	6	0.24%	2,477
26	778	18.53%	1,551	36.94%	1,783	42.46%	49	1.17%	30	0.71%	6	0.14%	2	0.05%	4,199
27	1,103	57.75%	248	12.98%	75	3.93%	362	18.95%	112	5.86%	5	0.26%	5	0.26%	1,910
28	1,005	34.56%	478	16.44%	319	10.97%	856	29.44%	233	8.01%	14	0.48%	3	0.10%	2,908
29	824	33.50%	403	16.38%	452	18.37%	569	23.13%	192	7.80%	15	0.61%	5	0.20%	2,460
30	2,100	60.82%	431	12.48%	200	5.79%	505	14.62%	204	5.91%	9	0.26%	4	0.12%	3,453
31	473	22.06%	713	33.26%	885	41.28%	49	2.29%	15	0.70%	7	0.33%	2	0.09%	2,144
32	1,347	32.77%	707	17.20%	487	11.85%	1,173	28.54%	347	8.44%	32	0.78%	17	0.41%	4,110
33	450	19.35%	1,167	50.19%	400	17.20%	211	9.08%	71	3.05%	16	0.69%	10	0.43%	2,325
34	3,436	37.38%	1,171	12.74%	1,617	17.59%	2,507	27.28%	438	4.77%	16	0.17%	6	0.07%	9,191
35	1,181	28.69%	1,321	32.09%	618	15.01%	559	13.58%	425	10.33%	10	0.24%	2	0.05%	4,116
36	1,759	29.92%	1,197	20.36%	853	14.51%	1,526	25.96%	505	8.59%	26	0.44%	13	0.22%	5,879
37	684	26.07%	778	29.65%	283	10.79%	573	21.84%	279	10.63%	21	0.80%	6	0.23%	2,624
38	2,361	52.94%	714	16.01%	306	6.86%	788	17.67%	268	6.01%	20	0.45%	3	0.07%	4,460
39	1,607	16.95%	3,393	35.79%	4,116	43.41%	257	2.71%	82	0.86%	18	0.19%	8	0.08%	9,481
40	2,346	32.38%	1,568	21.64%	1,228	16.95%	1,630	22.50%	438	6.05%	26	0.36%	9	0.12%	7,245
41	673	18.45%	1,674	45.90%	1,132	31.04%	110	3.02%	54	1.48%	3	0.08%	1	0.03%	3,647
42	907	26.71%	1,206	35.51%	527	15.52%	474	13.96%	256	7.54%	15	0.44%	11	0.32%	3,396
43	779	25.01%	1,065	34.19%	338	10.85%	531	17.05%	372	11.94%	19	0.61%	11	0.35%	3,115
44	1,126	35.64%	547	17.32%	219	6.93%	1,069	33.84%	185	5.86%	11	0.35%	2	0.06%	3,159
45	503	17.44%	1,367	47.40%	892	30.93%	70	2.43%	40	1.39%	8	0.28%	4	0.14%	2,884
46	2,514	51.13%	782	15.90%	206	4.19%	1,073	21.82%	319	6.49%	13	0.26%	10	0.20%	4,917
47	376	30.59%	182	14.81%	204	16.60%	321	26.12%	128	10.41%	11	0.90%	7	0.57%	1,229
48	811	26.12%	775	24.96%	643	20.71%	646	20.81%	209	6.73%	13	0.42%	8	0.26%	3,105
49	1,671	32.55%	838	16.33%	562	10.95%	1,236	24.08%	793	15.45%	17	0.33%	16	0.31%	5,133
50	3,222	36.86%	866	9.91%	338	3.87%	1,947	22.27%	2,329	26.64%	26	0.30%	14	0.16%	8,742
51	1,718	34.27%	875	17.45%	461	9.20%	1,542	30.76%	384	7.66%	20	0.40%	13	0.26%	5,013
52	3,253	45.82%	968	13.63%	483	6.80%	1,978	27.86%	387	5.45%	23	0.32%	8	0.11%	7,100
53	970	29.98%	1,237	38.24%	639	19.75%	253	7.82%	127	3.93%	8	0.25%	1	0.03%	3,235
54	756	30.74%	1,000	40.67%	455	18.50%	149	6.06%	88	3.58%	9	0.37%	2	0.08%	2,459
55	935	20.87%	1,908	42.59%	1,489	33.24%	88	1.96%	47	1.05%	10	0.22%	3	0.07%	4,480
56	1,752	26.34%	3,423	51.47%	1,230	18.49%	136	2.04%	90	1.35%	14	0.21%	6	0.09%	6,651
57	1,164	25.50%	2,072	45.40%	1,147	25.13%	128	2.80%	39	0.85%	8	0.18%	6	0.13%	4,564
58	2,204	31.48%	2,974	42.47%	1,585	22.64%	129	1.84%	89	1.27%	15	0.21%	6	0.09%	7,002
59	2,181	41.29%	635	12.02%	274	5.19%	1,315	24.90%	838	15.87%	31	0.59%	8	0.15%	5,282
60	1,666	38.75%	736	17.12%	401	9.33%	1,178	27.40%	291	6.77%	22	0.51%	5	0.12%	4,299
61	1,694	34.29%	850	17.21%	355	7.19%	978	19.80%	1,042	21.09%	11	0.22%	10	0.20%	4,940
62	907	23.74%	1,402	36.69%	1,028	26.90%	310	8.11%	153	4.00%	13	0.34%	8	0.21%	3,821
63	1,487	36.82%	1,613	39.94%	787	19.49%	77	1.91%	66	1.63%	7	0.17%	2	0.05%	4,039
64	628	24.94%	1,068	42.41%	739	29.35%	44	1.75%	33	1.31%	4	0.16%	2	0.08%	2,518
65	1,166	25.73%	2,074	45.77%	1,045	23.06%	164	3.62%	72	1.59%	6	0.13%	4	0.09%	4,531
66	1,596	23.71%	2,737	40.66%	2,193	32.58%	115	1.71%	74	1.10%	11	0.16%	5	0.07%	6,731

== Republican primary ==
Al Taubenberger became the Republican nominee after running unopposed.

=== Results ===
Republican primary results
Party	Candidate	Votes	%
Republican	Al Taubenberger	17,449	99.50
Republican	Write-in	88	0.50
Total votes		17,537	100.00

== General election ==
On November 6, Michael Nutter easily won the mayoral election, receiving 83.4% of the vote to Taubenberger's 17.3%. The margin of victory is the largest since 1931. Nutter's margin of victory was so large the Associated Press declared a winner after just one percent of the vote was counted. Turnout in the election was light with only 28.7 percent of registered voters casting a ballot. The 2007 election had the lowest turnout in a Philadelphia mayoral election without an incumbent since the Home Rule Charter of 1951.

In the general election, the candidates for Mayor were:

- Michael Nutter – A former Philadelphia City Councilman who left his seat in 2006 to run for mayor as a Democrat.
- Al Taubenberger – The President of the Greater Northeast Philadelphia Chamber of Commerce who ran as a Republican.
- John Staggs – A Germantown meat packer who ran as a member of the Socialist Workers Party.

In the general election, Michael Nutter became the odds-on favorite to win the election. Nutter raised US$2.9 million for his campaign while Taubenberger raised no more than US$20,000. The candidates held numerous joint appearances and had few disagreements. Towards the end of the race Taubenberger was advertising himself as the "super underdog" .

One of the most significant disagreements on issues the two candidates had was on Nutter's "stop and frisk" proposal. The proposal would allow police officers to stop and frisk people suspected of carrying illegal firearms. Taubenberger criticized the proposal, which was also criticized by Nutter's opponents in the primary and Police Commissioner Sylvester Johnson, saying the proposal could be abused and violate civil rights. Taubenberger proposed hiring more police officers to reduce the city's high murder rate.

Other disagreements dealt with the city's requirement that public employees live within the city, which Taubenberger proposed removing. Nutter said he would keep the rule, but would remove the restriction that allows only people who have lived in the city for at least one year to apply for city positions. Nutter and Taubenberger also disagreed on the city's decision to charge rent for the Cradle of Liberty Council as result of the Boy Scouts of America's policy on homosexuality which the city says violates its laws on discrimination. Nutter supported the decision saying his administration would not subsidize discrimination. Taubenberger said the decision was wrong because the Boy Scouts do too much good and keep kids off the streets.

=== Polling ===
Opinion Polls
Candidate	Oct 17–21
Michael Nutter	74%
Al Taubenberger	8%
Undecided	18%
Source	Keystone poll
Link	

=== Results ===
Philadelphia mayoral election, 2007
Party	Candidate	Votes	%	±%
Democratic	Michael Nutter	227,090	82.52	+25.2
Republican	Al Taubenberger	46,984	17.07	−26.3
Socialist Workers	John Staggs	1,038	0.38	N/A
Independent	Write-in candidates	78	0.03	N/A
Turnout		275,190	28.9	
Democratic hold		Swing		

Results by ward

Ward	Michael Nutter Democratic		Al Taubenberger Republican		John Staggs Socialist Workers		Total votes
Ward	#	%	#	%	#	%	Total votes
1	2,558	80.80%	598	18.89%	10	0.32%	3,166
2	4,355	86.05%	648	12.80%	58	1.15%	5,061
3	4,101	96.25%	155	3.64%	5	0.12%	4,261
4	3,845	96.00%	151	3.77%	9	0.22%	4,005
5	5,629	88.16%	717	11.23%	39	0.61%	6,385
6	2,194	96.23%	81	3.55%	5	0.22%	2,280
7	1,396	88.58%	175	11.10%	5	0.32%	1,576
8	6,173	88.68%	747	10.73%	41	0.59%	6,961
9	4,540	89.92%	483	9.57%	26	0.51%	5,049
10	5,757	96.84%	173	2.91%	15	0.25%	5,945
11	2,552	95.44%	117	4.38%	5	0.19%	2,674
12	3,850	94.46%	197	4.83%	29	0.71%	4,076
13	3,572	94.35%	202	5.34%	12	0.32%	3,786
14	1,305	95.33%	61	4.46%	3	0.22%	1,369
15	4,017	90.05%	418	9.37%	26	0.58%	4,461
16	2,095	95.53%	92	4.20%	6	0.27%	2,193
17	4,813	96.01%	190	3.79%	10	0.20%	5,013
18	1,928	79.51%	474	19.55%	23	0.95%	2,425
19	1,538	93.84%	99	6.04%	2	0.12%	1,639
20	1,155	94.98%	57	4.69%	4	0.33%	1,216
21	8,055	80.67%	1,894	18.97%	36	0.36%	9,985
22	6,452	95.73%	249	3.69%	39	0.58%	6,740
23	2,391	80.75%	565	19.08%	5	0.17%	2,961
24	1,957	94.54%	101	4.88%	12	0.58%	2,070
25	1,641	66.25%	824	33.27%	12	0.48%	2,477
26	2,667	68.30%	1,231	31.52%	7	0.18%	3,905
27	1,636	90.84%	143	7.94%	22	1.22%	1,801
28	2,312	96.78%	72	3.01%	5	0.21%	2,389
29	2,047	95.39%	93	4.33%	6	0.28%	2,146
30	2,840	92.90%	191	6.25%	26	0.85%	3,057
31	1,583	67.08%	758	32.12%	19	0.81%	2,360
32	3,132	96.40%	108	3.32%	9	0.28%	3,249
33	1,479	74.58%	497	25.06%	7	0.35%	1,983
34	7,113	93.53%	473	6.22%	19	0.25%	7,605
35	3,115	72.37%	1,179	27.39%	10	0.23%	4,304
36	4,593	92.90%	326	6.59%	25	0.51%	4,944
37	2,025	95.70%	85	4.02%	6	0.28%	2,116
38	3,699	92.73%	277	6.94%	13	0.33%	3,989
39	5,937	78.10%	1,642	21.60%	23	0.30%	7,602
40	5,560	91.33%	519	8.52%	9	0.15%	6,088
41	2,335	63.11%	1,344	36.32%	21	0.57%	3,700
42	2,475	87.64%	343	12.15%	6	0.21%	2,824
43	2,235	93.36%	154	6.43%	5	0.21%	2,394
44	2,426	95.93%	99	3.91%	4	0.16%	2,529
45	2,037	58.65%	1,424	41.00%	12	0.35%	3,473
46	4,067	95.00%	162	3.78%	52	1.21%	4,281
47	922	95.54%	39	4.04%	4	0.41%	965
48	2,393	85.49%	397	14.18%	9	0.32%	2,799
49	3,999	94.36%	228	5.38%	11	0.26%	4,238
50	7,309	96.65%	232	3.07%	21	0.28%	7,562
51	3,920	95.91%	149	3.65%	18	0.44%	4,087
52	5,888	94.63%	322	5.18%	12	0.19%	6,222
53	2,341	67.23%	1,130	32.45%	11	0.32%	3,482
54	1,718	77.14%	497	22.32%	12	0.54%	2,227
55	3,138	57.69%	2,289	42.08%	12	0.22%	5,439
56	4,349	60.00%	2,884	39.79%	15	0.21%	7,248
57	3,356	58.96%	2,310	40.58%	26	0.46%	5,692
58	5,569	59.42%	3,781	40.34%	22	0.23%	9,372
59	4,204	94.77%	204	4.60%	28	0.63%	4,436
60	3,477	95.84%	139	3.83%	12	0.33%	3,628
61	4,001	90.50%	404	9.14%	16	0.36%	4,421
62	2,621	73.81%	922	25.96%	8	0.23%	3,551
63	3,562	55.06%	2,894	44.74%	13	0.20%	6,469
64	2,074	54.26%	1,737	45.45%	11	0.29%	3,822
65	3,277	66.85%	1,612	32.88%	13	0.27%	4,902
66	5,790	57.69%	4,226	42.10%	21	0.21%	10,037

Preceded by 2003	Philadelphia mayoral election 2007	Succeeded by 2011
