= Kate Klunk =

American politician

Member of the Pennsylvania House of Representatives from the 169th district
- Incumbent
- Assumed office January 6, 2015
- Preceded by: Ed Neilson

Personal details
- Born: June 4, 1982 (age 44) Hanover, Pennsylvania, U.S.
- Party: Republican
- Education: Dickinson College (BA); Pennsylvania State University (JD)
- Occupation: Attorney

Kate Anne Klunk (born June 4, 1982) is a member of the Pennsylvania House of Representatives, representing the 169th House district in York County, Pennsylvania. Klunk was elected to serve as a representative on November 4, 2014.

== Early life, education and family ==
Klunk was born on June 4, 1982, in Hanover, Pennsylvania. Valedictorian of her class at Hanover High School in 2000, she was the recipient of the Athletic Booster Club Scholar Award, the Hanover Area Historical Society's William E. Bittinger Scholarship, the Kiwanis Scholarship for outstanding service to her school and community, the Paul C. Welsh Scholarship Achievement Award, the Student Council Scholarship, the Food Merchant Association's Tom Ridge Scholarship, and the Weis Markets Scholarship, which was given "to children of employees who possess good academic achievement and leadership skills." A recipient of the Benjamin Rush Scholarship at Dickinson College, she graduated with a degree in economics in 2004 and then earned her Juris Doctor degree from the Pennsylvania State University in 2010.

Her grandmother, Janice Helen (Rebert) Kunkel (1928–2021), was a native of Adams County, Pennsylvania and daughter of Ornan and Helen McGlaughlin Rebert of Orrtanna, She died in Hanover on January 15, 2021.

== Career ==
Klunk worked as an intern to U.S. Congressman Todd Platts and as a member of the National Economic Council and in the communications department of the Executive Office of the President during the George W. Bush administration. Prior to being elected to the Pennsylvania House of Representatives, Klunk worked as an attorney.

=== Pennsylvania House of Representatives ===
Klunk was one of 75 members of Pennsylvania's Congressional Delegation to sign a letter on December 4, 2020, regarding an Election Review for the 2020 presidential election. They asked that the state's election results be overturned.

In 2022, Klunk co-sponsored the “Save Women's Sports Act” which was a proposal to prevent transgender girls from competing in girls' school sports. She was also the primary sponsor of H.B. 1500, "An Act amending Title 18 (Crimes and Offenses) of the Pennsylvania Consolidated Statutes, in abortion, further providing for definitions, for medical consultation and judgment and for reporting," which would have banned abortions sought by parents receiving prenatal diagnoses of Down Syndrome."
