= Patricia Hughes (politician) =

American politician

Member of the Philadelphia City Council from the 7th District
- In office January 1984 – January 1988
- Preceded by: Harry Jannotti
- Succeeded by: Jack Kelly

Personal details
- Party: Democratic

Patricia Hughes was a member of Philadelphia City Council representing the 7th District and was Democratic Leader of the 7th Ward.

She grew up in Kensington and after graduating from high school worked in a civil service job until in 1976 Harry Jannotti asked her to work for him. After Jannotti resigned amidst a corruption scandal, he supported Hughes who won the Democratic primary by 542 votes and then won the general election in November 1983. When she ran for re-election in November 1987 she lost to Republican Jack Kelly.
