= Dan Frankel (American politician) =

American politician

Dan B. Frankel
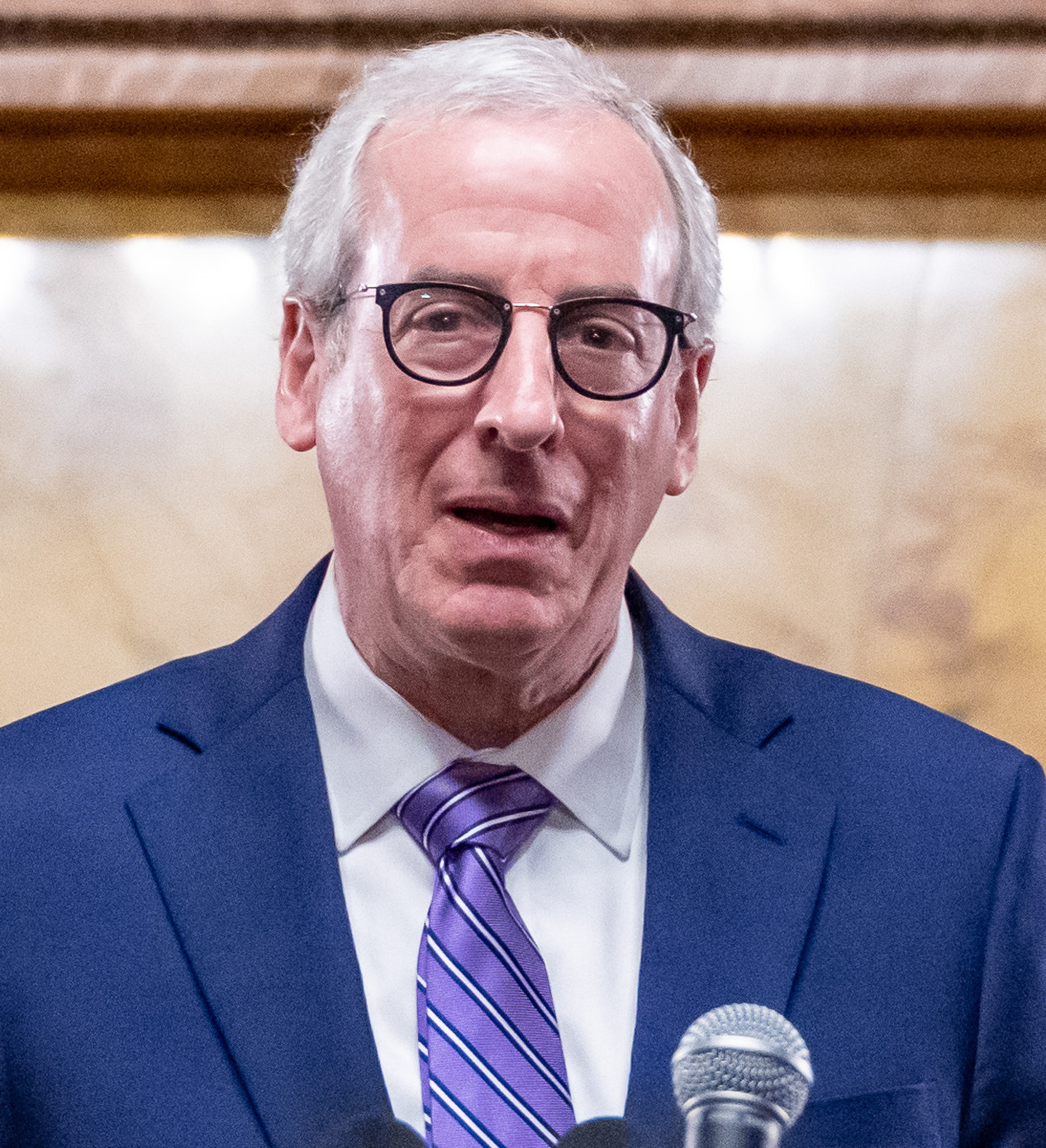
- Frankel in 2023

Member of the Pennsylvania House of Representatives from the 23rd district
- Incumbent
- Assumed office January 5, 1999
- Preceded by: Ivan Itkin

Personal details
- Born: April 11, 1956 (age 70) Pittsburgh, Pennsylvania, U.S.
- Party: Democratic
- Spouse: Debra R. Frankel
- Education: The Pennington School; Kenyon College
- Occupation: Businessman

Dan B. Frankel (born April 11, 1956) is a Democratic member of the Pennsylvania House of Representatives for the 23rd District. He was first elected to the House in 1998. During the 2021-2022 legislative session, he serves as the Democratic Chair of the House Health Committee and a member of the Rules Committee.
