= Dennis M. O'Brien =

American politician (born 1952)

Dennis O'Brien
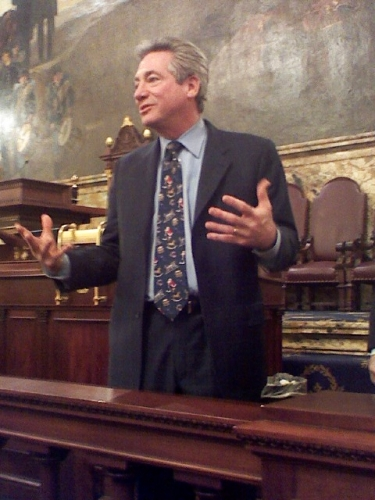

Member of the Philadelphia City Council from the at-large district
- In office January 2, 2012 – January 3, 2016
- Preceded by: Frank Rizzo Jr.
- Succeeded by: Al Taubenberger

137th Speaker of the Pennsylvania House of Representatives
- In office January 2, 2007 – November 30, 2008
- Preceded by: John Perzel
- Succeeded by: Keith McCall

Member of the Pennsylvania House of Representatives from the 169th district
- In office January 5, 1983 – January 2, 2012
- Preceded by: John Swaim
- Succeeded by: Ed Neilson
- In office January 4, 1977 – November 30, 1980
- Preceded by: Stephen Wojdak
- Succeeded by: John Swaim

Personal details
- Born: June 22, 1952 (age 74) Philadelphia, Pennsylvania, U.S.
- Party: Republican
- Children: 3

Dennis Michael O'Brien (born June 22, 1952) is an American Republican Party politician who served as the 137th Speaker of the Pennsylvania House of Representatives from 2007 to 2008. First elected in 1976, he represented the 169th Legislative District in the state House for the most part of four decades. He served as a member of the Philadelphia City Council for one term, from 2012 to 2016.

== Early life and education ==
O'Brien was born on June 22, 1952, in Philadelphia. He graduated from Archbishop Ryan High School, and attended La Salle University, where he earned a bachelor's degree in Labor Relations. He has three sons: Dennis Jr., Brendan, and Joseph.

== Career ==
O'Brien was first elected to the Pennsylvania House in 1976 and served two terms before giving up his seat in 1980 to challenge fellow Republican Charles Dougherty for his congressional seat.

O'Brien lost to Dougherty by 480 votes in the primary. In 1982, O'Brien ran for his old seat in the Pennsylvania House and won. He was re-elected in every succeeding election he contested. Prior to his elevation to the Speakership, he served as chairman of the House Committees on Veterans Affairs and Emergency Preparedness, Health and Human Services, Consumer Affairs, Judiciary. Upon leaving the Speaker's office, he served as chairman of the Committee on Children and Youth.

=== Autism advocacy ===
Inspired by his late nephew Christopher's diagnosis, O'Brien has been an advocate for autism issues and founded the Pennsylvania Legislative Autism Caucus.

In over 20 years, he has proposed a number of bills requiring mandatory school and health care funding for patients.

He worked with Governor Ed Rendell to organize a Bureau of Autism Services within the state's Office of Developmental Programs. In 2008, one of his bills, requiring insurance companies to cover autism treatment, was passed and signed into law.

=== 2007 Speaker election ===
O'Brien became the Speaker of the House following deals between Republicans and Democrats. Despite a one-seat Democratic majority, the Democratic leader, Bill DeWeese, was unable to garner the votes necessary to win back the Speakership due to some dissatisfaction within his own caucus because of his handling of matters as leader, and notably due to the decision by one member in his caucus to vote for John Perzel, the incumbent Speaker. DeWeese nominated O'Brien, a Republican and a Perzel rival, in a surprise move.

O'Brien went on to defeat Perzel, 105–97. O'Brien was the first minority-party Speaker in the Pennsylvania House of Representatives.

=== 2008 primary election ===
O'Brien defeated what was described as an "underground write-in campaign" in the 2008 Democratic primary election. With no Democrat on the ballot, a write-in candidate emerged in an attempt to secure a position on the November ballot as a Democrat. He organized his own campaign and defeated his opponent 1,372–416, meaning that O'Brien was listed on both parties' ballots in the general election.

=== Post-Speakership ===
Upon the election of 2008, the Democrats saw the opportunity to put their own in the Speaker's office. Representative Keith McCall of Carbon County was elected Speaker with O'Brien opting out of the race. He was named the minority chairman of the House Committee on Children and Youth. In addition to those responsibilities, O'Brien worked with the Department of Public Welfare to ensure implementation of Act 62 (mandating autism insurance in Pennsylvania) which he wrote and passed while he was the Speaker.

=== 2011 City Council election ===
O'Brien announced his intention to run for one of the minority seats on Philadelphia City Council in 2011. He, attorney David Oh, and incumbent Frank Rizzo Jr. were considered the clear favorites among the Republican contenders. On May 17, 2011, in spite of not being supported by any of the party organizations, O'Brien won one of the five GOP nominations for the City Council's at-large seats, with 17.32% of the vote. Oh won 18.50% of the vote, being first among the field of candidates, while Rizzo was soundly defeated, coming in 7th out of nine candidates—a result some have attributed to his involvement in DROP, the Deferred Retirement Option Plan. O'Brien went on to be the top finisher among the minority party candidates with an approximately 10,000-vote lead. He was sworn into Council on January 2, 2012.

He was the sole member of Council voting to oppose a public water rate setting board, opting to instead leave that decision in the hands of the Water Commissioner.

=== 2015 Council reelection ===
O'Brien again ran for reelection to one of the two minority seats. He faced a field of five candidates, including the other incumbent, David Oh. With 100 percent of the ballots counted, O'Brien lost to Oh and Councilman Al Taubenberger.

Philadelphia City Council
Preceded by Frank Rizzo Jr.	Member of the Philadelphia City Council for the At-Large District; 2012–2016	Succeeded by Al Taubenberger
Political offices
Preceded by John Perzel	Speaker of the Pennsylvania House of Representatives; 2007–2008	Succeeded by Keith McCall
Pennsylvania House of Representatives
Preceded by Stephen Wojdak	Member of the Pennsylvania House of Representatives for the 169th District; 1977–1980	Succeeded by John Swaim
Preceded by John Swaim	Member of the Pennsylvania House of Representatives for the 169th District; 1983–2012	Succeeded by Ed Neilson
