= John Swaim =

American politician

John J. Swaim

Member of the Pennsylvania House of Representatives from the 169th district
- In office January 4, 1981 – November 30, 1982
- Preceded by: Denny O'Brien
- Succeeded by: Denny O'Brien

Personal details
- Born: March 19, 1949 Philadelphia, Pennsylvania
- Died: May 4, 2013 (aged 64) Philadelphia, Pennsylvania
- Party: Democratic

John J. Swaim, Jr. (March 19, 1949 – May 4, 2013) was a former Democratic member of the Pennsylvania House of Representatives. He was born in Philadelphia. An attorney, he died on May 4, 2013, at the age of 64.
