= Joseph Semanoff =

American politician

Member of the Pennsylvania House of Representatives from the 122nd district
- In office January 7, 1969 – November 30, 1974
- Preceded by: District Created
- Succeeded by: Thomas McCall

Member of the Pennsylvania House of Representatives from the Carbon County district
- In office January 2, 1967 – November 30, 1968

Personal details
- Born: August 16, 1916 Coaldale, Pennsylvania
- Died: March 1981 (aged 64)
- Party: Republican

Joseph Semanoff (August 16, 1916 – March 1981) was a Republican member of the Pennsylvania House of Representatives.
