= Pennsylvania House of Representatives, District 169 =

American legislative district

Pennsylvania's 169th State House of Representatives district
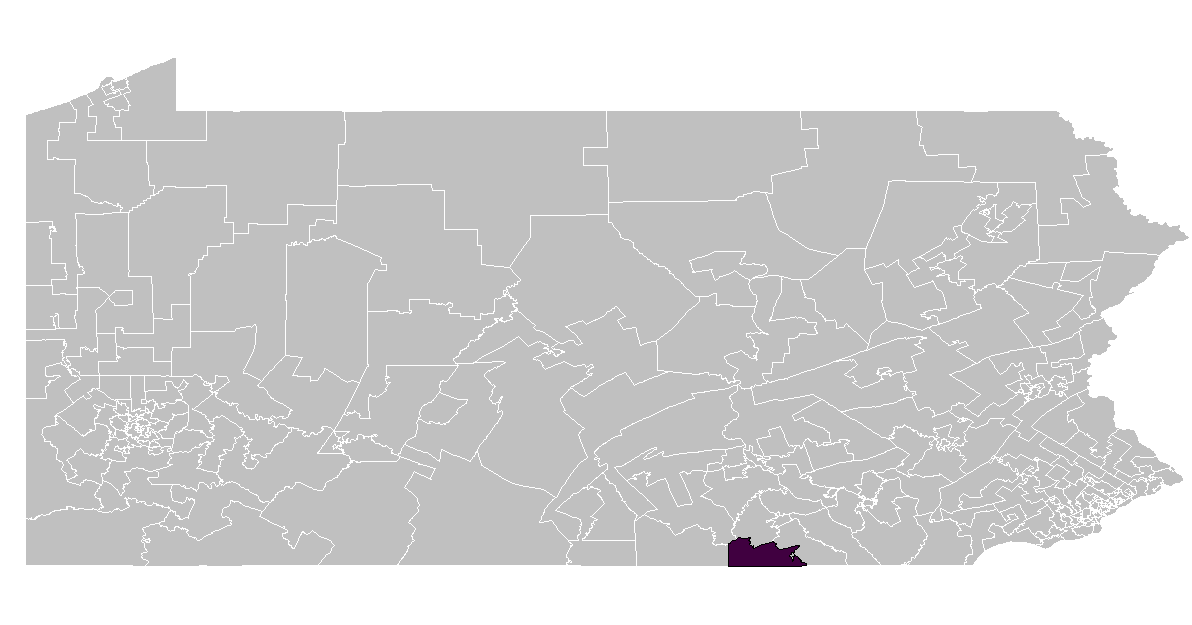
Representative
Kate Klunk; R–Hanover
- Demographics: 94.4% White; 1.6% Black; 3.1% Hispanic
- Population (2011) • Citizens of voting age: 62,846; 48,871

The 169th Pennsylvania House of Representatives District is located in Southeastern Pennsylvania and has been represented by Kate Klunk since 2014.

== District profile ==
The 169th Pennsylvania House of Representatives District is located in York County, Pennsylvania and includes the following areas:

- Codorus Township
- Glen Rock
- Hanover
- Heidelberg Township
- Jefferson
- Manheim Township
- New Freedom
- Penn Township
- Railroad
- Shrewsbury Township
- West Manheim Township

== Representatives ==
Representative	Party	Years	District home	Note
Prior to 1969, seats were apportioned by county.
Stephen Wojdak	Democrat	1969 – 1976		
Dennis M. O'Brien	Republican	1977 – 1980		
John J. Swaim	Democrat	1981 – 1982		
Dennis M. O'Brien	Republican	1983 – 2012	Philadelphia	Resigned upon election to Philadelphia City Council
Ed Neilson	Democrat	2012 – 2014	Philadelphia	Elected in special election on April 24, 2012. Resigned upon election to Philadelphia City Council
District moved from Philadelphia County to York County after 2014
Kate Klunk	Republican	2015 – present	Hanover	Incumbent

== Recent election results ==
=== 2010 ===
PA House election, 2010: Pennsylvania House, District 169
Party	Candidate	Votes	%	±%
Republican	Dennis M. O'Brien	12,525	100	
Margin of victory		12,525	100	
Turnout		12,525	100	

=== 2012 ===
PA House election, 2012: Pennsylvania House, District 169
Party	Candidate	Votes	%	±%
Democratic	Edward Neilson	15,825	65.2	
Republican	David Kralle	8,435	24.8	
Margin of victory		7,390	30.4	
Turnout		24,260	100	

=== 2014 ===
PA House election, 2014: Pennsylvania House, District 169
Party	Candidate	Votes	%	±%
Republican	Kate Klunk	14,347	100	
Margin of victory		14,347	100	
Turnout		14,397	100	

=== 2016 ===
PA House election, 2016: Pennsylvania House, District 169
Party	Candidate	Votes	%	±%
Republican	Kate Klunk	23,042	80.71	
	Robert Marcoccio	5,506	19.29	
Margin of victory		17,536	61.42	
Turnout		28,548	100	
