= Pennsylvania House of Representatives, District 23 =

American legislative district

Pennsylvania's 23rd State House of Representatives district
Representative
Dan Frankel; D–Pittsburgh
- Population (2022): 61,580

The 23rd Pennsylvania House of Representatives District is located in southwestern Pennsylvania and has been represented by Dan Frankel since 1999.

== District profile ==
The 23rd District is located in Allegheny County, entirely within Pittsburgh, and includes the following areas:

- Pittsburgh (part)
  - Ward 04 (part)
    - Division 05
    - Division 08
    - Division 09
    - Division 10
    - Division 11
    - Division 12
    - Division 13
    - Division 14
    - Division 15
    - Division 16
  - Ward 07 (part)
    - Division 01
    - Division 02
    - Division 05
    - Division 06
    - Division 07
    - Division 10
    - Division 13
    - Division 14
  - Ward 14 (part)
    - Division 01
    - Division 02
    - Division 03
    - Division 04
    - Division 05
    - Division 06
    - Division 07
    - Division 08
    - Division 09
    - Division 10
    - Division 11
    - Division 19
    - Division 20
    - Division 21
    - Division 22
    - Division 23
    - Division 24
    - Division 25
    - Division 26
    - Division 27
    - Division 28
    - Division 29
    - Division 30
    - Division 31
    - Division 32
    - Division 33
    - Division 34
    - Division 35
    - Division 36
    - Division 37
    - Division 38
    - Division 39
    - Division 40
    - Division 41
  - Ward 15 (part)
    - Division 01
    - Division 02
    - Division 03
    - Division 04
    - Division 05
    - Division 06
    - Division 07
    - Division 08
    - Division 09
    - Division 10
    - Division 11
    - Division 12

== Representatives ==
Representative	Party	Years	District home	Note
Prior to 1969, seats were apportioned by county.
Gerald Kaufman	Democrat	1969 – 1972		
Ivan Itkin	Democrat	1973 – 1998		
Dan Frankel	Democrat	1999 – present	Pittsburgh	Incumbent

== Recent election results ==
PA House election, 2024: Pennsylvania House, District 23
Party	Candidate	Votes	%
Democratic	Dan Frankel (incumbent)	Unopposed	
Total votes		29,815	100.00
Democratic hold			

PA House election, 2022: Pennsylvania House, District 23
Party	Candidate	Votes	%
Democratic	Dan Frankel (incumbent)	22,340	88.22
Green	Jay Walker	2,983	11.78
Total votes		25,323	100.00
Democratic hold			

PA House election, 2020: Pennsylvania House, District 23
Party	Candidate	Votes	%
Democratic	Dan Frankel (incumbent)	24,685	85.42
Green	Jay Walker	4,212	14.58
Total votes		28,897	100.00
Democratic hold			

PA House election, 2018: Pennsylvania House, District 23
Party	Candidate	Votes	%
Democratic	Dan Frankel (incumbent)	22,626	90.55
Green	Jay Walker	2,362	9.45
Total votes		24,988	100.00
Democratic hold			

PA House election, 2016: Pennsylvania House, District 23
Party	Candidate	Votes	%
Democratic	Dan Frankel (incumbent)	Unopposed	
Total votes		28,902	100.00
Democratic hold			

PA House election, 2014: Pennsylvania House, District 23
Party	Candidate	Votes	%
Democratic	Dan Frankel (incumbent)	Unopposed	
Total votes		13,246	100.00
Democratic hold			

PA House election, 2012: Pennsylvania House, District 23
Party	Candidate	Votes	%
Democratic	Dan Frankel (incumbent)	Unopposed	
Total votes		26,742	100.00
Democratic hold			

PA House election, 2010: Pennsylvania House, District 23
Party	Candidate	Votes	%
Democratic	Dan Frankel (incumbent)	16,267	79.92
Republican	Daniel Wiseman	4,088	20.08
Total votes		20,355	100.00
Democratic hold			
