= Thomas J. McCall =

American politician

Member of the Pennsylvania House of Representatives from the 122nd district
- In office January 3, 1975 – December 24, 1981
- Preceded by: Joseph Semanoff
- Succeeded by: Keith McCall

Personal details
- Born: January 27, 1935 Summit Hill, Pennsylvania, U.S.
- Died: December 24, 1981 (aged 46) Carbondale, Pennsylvania, U.S.
- Party: Democratic
- Children: Keith R. McCall

Thomas J. McCall (January 27, 1935 – December 24, 1981) was an American politician who served as a Democratic member of the Pennsylvania House of Representatives.
