= Pennsylvania House of Representatives, District 122 =

American legislative district

Pennsylvania's 122nd State House of Representatives district
Representative
Doyle Heffley; R–Lower Towamensing Township
- Demographics: 95.7% White; 1.5% Black; 0.3% Hispanic
- Population (2011) • Citizens of voting age: 62,215; 49,303

The 122nd Pennsylvania House of Representatives District is coterminous with Carbon County and has been represented by Doyle Heffley since 2011.

== Representatives ==
Representative	Party	Years	District home	Note
Prior to 1969, seats were apportioned by county.
Joseph Semanoff	Republican	1969 – 1975		
Thomas J. McCall	Democrat	1975 – 1981	Summit Hill	Died on December 24, 1981
Keith R. McCall	Democrat	1982 – 2010	Summit Hill	Retired
Doyle Heffley	Republican	2011 – present	Palmerton	Incumbent

McCall did not seek re-election in 2010. Republicans won numerous Democratic seats in Pennsylvania in 2010, including Keith McCall's.

On November 4, 2008, Keith McCall won re-election to the 122nd District seat of the Pennsylvania House of Representatives. He received 16,981 votes, defeating Republican Doyle Heffley (9,549).^{[2]}

Pennsylvania House of Representatives, District 122
Candidates	Votes	Percent
Keith McCall (D)	16,981	64.0%
Doyle M. Heffley (R)	9,549	36.0%

== Recent election results ==
PA House election, 2010: Pennsylvania House, District 122
Party	Candidate	Votes	%	±%
Republican	Doyle Heffley	10,825	56.34	
Democratic	Justin Yaich	8,390	43.66	
Margin of victory		2,435	12.68	
Turnout		19,215	100	

PA House election, 2012: Pennsylvania House, District 122
Party	Candidate	Votes	%	±%
Republican	Doyle Heffley	15,006	59.06	
Democratic	Ronald Rabenold	10,403	40.94	
Margin of victory		4,603	18.12	▲5.44
Turnout		25,409	100	

PA House election, 2014: Pennsylvania House, District 122
Party	Candidate	Votes	%	±%
Republican	Doyle Heffley	10,427	64.49	
Democratic	Patricia Borger	5,741	35.51	
Margin of victory		4,686	28.98	▲10.86
Turnout		16,168	100	

PA House election, 2016: Pennsylvania House, District 122
Party	Candidate	Votes	%	±%
Republican	Doyle Heffley	16,269	59.48	
Democratic	Neil Makhija	10,569	38.64	
Libertarian	Matthew Schutter	514	1.88	
Margin of victory		5,700	20.84	▼8.14
Turnout		27,352	100	
