= Doyle Heffley =

American politician and consultant

- Heffley in 2026

Member of the Pennsylvania House of Representatives from the 122nd district
- Incumbent
- Assumed office January 4, 2011
- Preceded by: Keith McCall

Personal details
- Born: February 24, 1970 (age 56) Lehighton, Pennsylvania, U.S.
- Party: Republican
- Spouse: Kellie
- Children: 2 children
- Education: Lincoln Technical Institute
- Occupation: Consultant, politician

Doyle M. Heffley (born February 24, 1970) is an American politician, consultant, and member of the Republican Party. In 2010, he was elected to represent the 122nd District in the Pennsylvania House of Representatives. He ran for the position in 2008 against incumbent Keith McCall and lost. Heffley won the spot in 2010 Election after McCall retired and did not run for reelection.

Heffley currently sits on the Appropriations, Human Services, Tourism & Recreational Development, and Transportation committees.
