= S. R. Wojdak & Associates =

S.R. Wojdak & Associates, LP
- Company type: limited partnership
- Industry: lobbying
- Headquarters: 200 South Broad Street; Philadelphia, Pennsylvania, U.S.
- Key people: Steve Crawford President & Partner
- Website: www.wojdak.com

S.R. Wojdak & Associates, LP, commonly known as Wojdak Government Relations, is a lobbying firm based in Philadelphia, Pennsylvania.

== History ==
=== 20th century ===
Wojdak was among the first lobbying firms to bring contract lobbying to Harrisburg.

In January 1999, Pittsburgh Post-Gazette described Wojdak & Associates as "one of the biggest and best-known firms in the state."

=== 21st century ===
In November 2000, Philadelphia Business Journal described it as one of the "largest and most influential lobbying firms" in the state.

In January 2009, Pennsylvania Report reported that the firm is "widely known to bring home the funds" for clients.

In 2016, the firm appointed Steve Crawford as president and partner of the firm following the death of Stephen Wojdak, the firm's founder. Crawford was named to City & State's PA Power 100 List in 2023.
