= Ed Neilson =

American politician (born 1963)

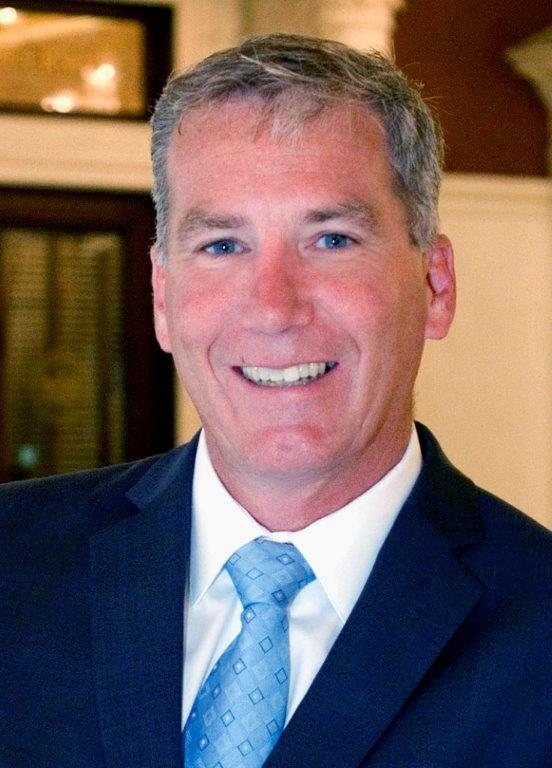

Member of the Pennsylvania House of Representatives from the 174th district
- Incumbent
- Assumed office August 25, 2015
- Preceded by: John Sabatina

Member of the Philadelphia City Council from the at-large district
- In office August 14, 2014 – June 19, 2015
- Preceded by: Bill Green
- Succeeded by: Derek S. Green

Member of the Pennsylvania House of Representatives from the 169th district
- In office May 8, 2012 – August 14, 2014
- Preceded by: Denny O'Brien
- Succeeded by: Kate Klunk

Personal details
- Born: August 23, 1963 (age 63)
- Party: Democratic
- Spouse: Doris
- Children: Five
- Education: Saint Joseph's University
- Occupation: Politician, Union official
- Website: Ed Neilson

Edward James "Ed" Neilson (born August 23, 1963) is an American politician and member of the Democratic Party. In April 2012, he won a special election to represent the 169th District in the Pennsylvania House of Representatives. In May 2014 he won a special election to serve as an at-large member of Philadelphia City Council replacing outgoing councilmember Bill Green. In August 2015, he won a special election to represent the 174th District in the Pennsylvania House of Representatives.

== Early life and education ==
A native of Northeast Philadelphia, Neilson attended Abraham Lincoln High School, graduating in 1981. He attended the Comey Institute at St. Joseph's University in 2004.

== Political career ==
Neilson is a former political director for the International Brotherhood of Electrical Workers (IBEW)'s Local 98 chapter. He went on to serve as Pennsylvania Department of Labor and Industry Executive Deputy State Labor Secretary under Governor Ed Rendell, and eventually became director of business development and government relations at Chartwell Law Offices.

=== PA State Senate ===
==== 2022 Special Election ====
Neilson was considered for the 5th Senatorial District seat after John Sabatina resigned on December 31, 2021, after being elected to the Philadelphia Court of Common Pleas the previous month. After a meeting of Democratic leaders asked to not be considered and Ward Leaders Shawn Dillon, Connie Dougherty, Alan Butkovitz, Pat Parkinson, Jim Donnelly, Bobby Henon, John Del Ricci, Harry Enggasser, Pete McDermott and John Sabatina Sr decided to support Shawn Dillion.

Shawn Dillion failed to submit his financial disclosures which were required by law for candidacy and was forced to drop out. He was replaced as a candidate by his brother Jimmy Dillion.

=== PA State House ===
==== 2012 Special Election ====
In November 2011, Republican Denny O'Brien was elected to one of the Philadelphia City Council's at-large seats. O'Brien, who had comfortably held the 169th District seat in the State House for several decades, resigned from the General Assembly the following January. O'Brien's departure in part precipitated the decision on the part of the House Republican leadership to move the 169th district out of Philadelphia and into York County. The existing 169th district was to be split among the districts of Democrats Brendan Boyle, Kevin Boyle, Michael McGeehan and John Sabatina, Jr., as well as Republican John Taylor. However, the State Supreme Court struck-down the map, ruling its splitting of cities, townships and boroughs was unconstitutional. Therefore, a special election held on the existing boundaries was called for April 24, 2012.

Neilson entered the race to succeed O'Brien, and won the Democratic primary unopposed. In the special election, he faced Dave Kralle, a long-time aide to O'Brien who served as his chief of staff at the end of his legislative tenure. On election day, Neilson defeated Kralle, and will hold the seat until January 2013. He will again face Kralle in the November 2012 general election, this time vying for a full two-year term.

Pennsylvania House of Representatives, District 169: April 24, 2012 Special Election
Party	Candidate	Votes	%	±%
Democratic	Ed Neilson	3,453	53.95	+53.95
Republican	Dave Kralle	2,941	45.95	−54.05
Write-ins		6	0.09	+0.09
Majority		506	7.99	−92.01
Democratic gain from Republican		Swing	54	

==== 2015 Special Election ====
Pennsylvania House of Representatives, District 174: August 11, 2016 Special Election
Party	Candidate	Votes	%	±%
Democratic	Ed Neilson	2,343	62.33%	
Republican	Timothy Dailey	1,413	37.59%	
Write-ins		3	0.08%	
Majority				
Democratic gain from Republican		Swing		

==== Tenure ====
Neilson was sworn in on May 8, 2012. He served on the Children and Youth, and Veterans Affairs and Emergency Preparedness committees.

=== City Council ===
==== 2014 Special Election ====
In February 2014, former City Council Member Bill Green and was sworn in as the chair of the School Reform Commission. He was nominated by Governor Tom Corbett. In March 2014, Democratic ward leaders picked Neilson for the City Council special election that would be held in May 2014. Neilson entered the race to succeed Bill Green, and won the special election to defeat Matt Wolfe, a Republican ward leader from West Philadelphia. He later resigned the seat on June 19, 2015.

City Council At-Large: May 20, 2014 Special Election
Party	Candidate	Votes	%	±%
Democratic	Ed Neilson	66,204	78.65%	
Republican	Matt Wolfe	13,018	15.47%	
Libertarian	Nikki Allen Poe	4,403	5.23%	
Write-ins		551		
Majority				
Democratic hold				

==== Tenure ====
Neilson was sworn into Philadelphia City Council on August 14, 2014, and resigned on June 19, 2015.

== Personal life ==
Neilson, his wife and five sons currently reside in Northeast Philadelphia.
