= Ivan Itkin =

American politician (1936–2020)

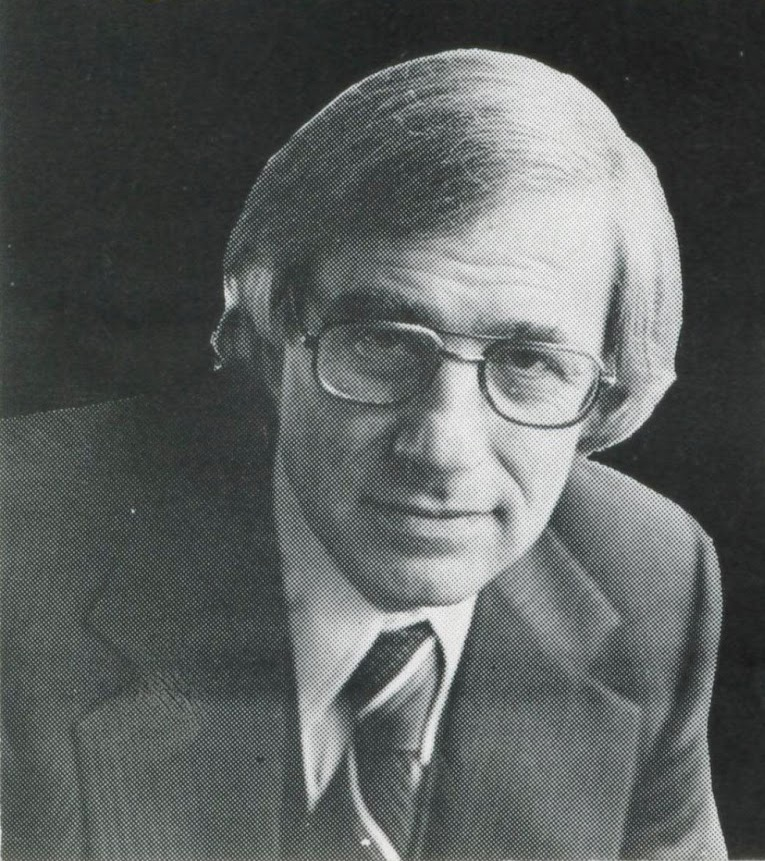
- Itkin c. 1980

Majority Leader of the Pennsylvania House of Representatives
- In office January 5, 1993 – January 3, 1995
- Preceded by: Bill DeWeese
- Succeeded by: Bill DeWeese

Member of the Pennsylvania House of Representatives from the 23rd district
- In office January 2, 1973 – January 5, 1999
- Preceded by: Gerald Kaufman
- Succeeded by: Dan Frankel

Personal details
- Born: March 29, 1936 New York City, New York, U.S.
- Died: April 5, 2020 (aged 84) Fort Lauderdale, Florida, U.S.
- Party: Democratic
- Spouse: Joyce Hudak
- Children: 3
- Education: New York University (BS, MS); University of Pittsburgh (PhD)

Ivan Itkin (March 29, 1936 – April 5, 2020) was an American politician who served as a Democratic member of the Pennsylvania House of Representatives from 1973 to 1998. He was the Democratic nominee for Governor of Pennsylvania in 1998.

== Early life ==
Itkin was born in New York City on March 9, 1936. He was Jewish. In 1956, he graduated from the Polytechnic Institute of Brooklyn with a bachelor's degree in chemical engineering. Itkin went on to receive a master's degree from New York University in Nuclear Engineering in 1957. After a stint working as a reactor physicist at Westinghouse Bettis Atomic Power Laboratory Itkin received a Ph.D. in mathematics from the University of Pittsburgh in 1964. He worked as a nuclear scientist and applied mathematician until 1972, when he was elected to the Pennsylvania House of Representatives' 23rd District, which includes portions of Allegheny County.

== Political career ==
=== State House of Representatives ===
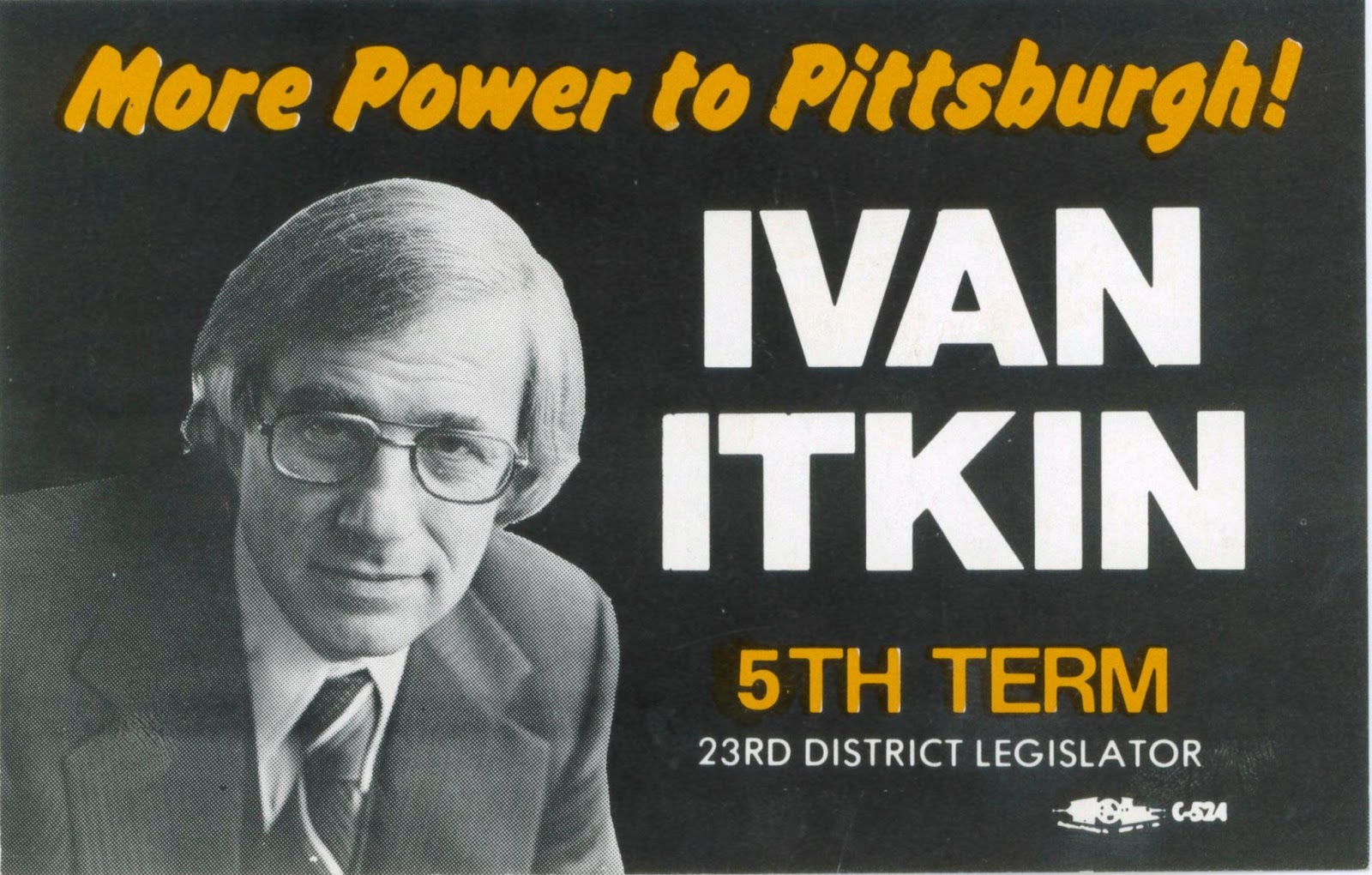
Palm card, 1980

Itkin held a variety of leadership positions with the House's Democratic caucus. He served as majority whip from 1990 though 1992. He was elected majority leader in 1992, and minority whip in 1994. He was also appointed Speaker Pro Tempore during the 1987-1988 session.

=== Candidate for governor ===
Itkin ran against Republican incumbent Tom Ridge. He and his running mate, former Congresswoman Marjorie Margolies-Mezvinsky, lost the election with 31% of the vote.

1998 Pennsylvania gubernatorial election
Party	Candidate	Votes	%
Republican	Tom Ridge Running mate: Mark Schweiker	1,736,844	57.42
Democratic	Ivan Itkin Running mate: Marjorie Margolies-Mezvinsky	938,745	31.03
Constitution	Peg Luksik Running mate :Jim Clymer	315,761	10.04
Libertarian	Ken Krawchuk Running mate: Henry Haller III	33,591	1.11

== Later career ==
Itkin retired from the House following his gubernatorial defeat and was subsequently appointed director of the Office of Civilian Radioactive Waste Management in the Department of Energy by President Bill Clinton in 1999.

He died of heart failure on April 5, 2020, in Fort Lauderdale, Florida at age 84.

Pennsylvania House of Representatives
Preceded by Bill DeWeese	Majority Leader of the Pennsylvania House of Representatives; 1993–1995	Succeeded by Bill DeWeese
Party political offices
Preceded by Mark Singel	Democratic nominee for Governor of Pennsylvania; 1998	Succeeded by Ed Rendell
