= Stephen Wojdak =

American politician

Member of the Pennsylvania House of Representatives from the 169th district
- In office January 7, 1969 – November 30, 1976
- Preceded by: District created
- Succeeded by: Dennis O'Brien

Personal details
- Born: Stephen Richard Wojdak; December 15, 1938 Scranton, Pennsylvania, U.S.
- Died: June 2, 2015 (aged 76) Boston, Massachusetts, U.S.
- Party: Democratic
- Education: University of Pennsylvania Law School

Stephen Richard Wojdak (December 15, 1938 – June 2, 2015) was an American politician who was a member of the Pennsylvania House of Representatives and a prominent lobbyist in Pennsylvania, where he was the president and CEO of S. R. Wojdak & Associates.

== Early life and education ==
Wojdak was born in Scranton, Pennsylvania, on December 15, 1938. He was a graduate of the University of Scranton and University of Pennsylvania Law School.

== Career ==
=== Pennsylvania House ===
In 1968, he was elected to represent the 169th District in the Pennsylvania House of Representatives. He served four terms in the House, ultimately serving as chairman of the House Appropriations Committee, before retiring in 1976.

=== Lobbyist ===
The next year, he founded S. R. Wojdak & Associates, a lobbying firm with offices in Philadelphia and Harrisburg.

Wojdak's first lobbying client was the Hospital Association of Pennsylvania, and he was successful in securing $70 million in state to pay for indigent care at 320 Pennsylvania hospitals. From that initial client, Wojdak's firm has developed into one of the premier lobbying firms in the state. The firm's client list includes Fortune 500 companies, major universities and health care systems, cultural and tourist organizations, and trade associations. He was instrumental in attempts to change Pennsylvania's tort reform laws, telecommunications and electric deregulation efforts, and in obtaining state funds for the Pennsylvania Convention Center, the Wachovia Center, SEPTA, and Lincoln Financial Field.

Media reports have regularly hailed Wojdak as one of the most effective lobbyists in Harrisburg. In 1992, the Philadelphia Daily News dubbed Wojdak as the "King of Clout," saying that "through savvy, contacts, and money, Stephen Wojdak is influencing public policy like no one else. In 1994, the Pittsburgh Tribune-Review, said that "so pervasive is the Harrisburg clout of Stephen Wojdak that some lawmakers refer to him as the 51st Senator" and a few years later, the Pittsburgh Post-Gazette, said that "of the 848 registered lobbyists in the state, Wojdak is considered to have the most clout." In 1999, Philadelphia Magazine, named him to its Power 100 list, saying he is a "player nonpareil of the Harrisburg lobbying game." Wojdak has hired several prominent former legislative staffers, including Joseph P. McLaughlin, a former Philadelphia deputy mayor, who managed the Philadelphia business of Wojdak & Associates in the 1990s. Martin Sellers, owner of Sellers-Dorsey, a national health care consulting firm, was one of the founding members of the Wojdak firm.

In 2000, Wojdak founded a new public relations company, which is headed by former Philadelphia Deputy Mayor Kevin A. Feeley. Bellevue Communications Group is a full-service public relations firm.

In June 2002, lobbyist Holly Kinser sought to return to the Harrisburg lobbying community from Chicago and Kinser's ex-husband Bill DeWeese asked Wojdak not to hire Kinser. Later that year, Wojdak did hire Kinser; accounts conflict on the specifics of what happened in the earlier meeting and whether Wojdak had actually broken any agreement. DeWeese penned a letter (eventually leaked to PoliticsPA and published to wide dissemination) calling Wojdak an "abject, ignoble, mendacious knave." In relatiation, DeWeese sought to keep Wojdak off of the board of the Philadelphia Convention Center Authority.

In 2003 and 2009, Wojdak was named to the Pennsylvania Report "Power 75" list, and he was named to the PoliticsPA list of "Sy Snyder's Power 50" in 2002 and 2003.

In 2010, Politics Magazine named him one of the most influential Democrats in Pennsylvania.

== Death ==
Wojdak died on June 2, 2015, in Boston, Massachusetts, while on vacation on Martha's Vineyard.
