= Frank Rizzo Jr. =

American politician (born 1943)

Member of the Philadelphia City Council from the at-large district
- In office January 8, 1996 – January 2, 2012
- Preceded by: Joan Specter
- Succeeded by: Denny O'Brien

Personal details
- Born: Francis Silvestri Rizzo; March 5, 1943 (age 83) Philadelphia, Pennsylvania, U.S.
- Party: Democratic (before 1987, 2013–present)
- Other political affiliations: Republican (1987–2011); Independent (2011–2012)
- Parent: Frank Rizzo (father)

Francis Silvestri Rizzo (born March 5, 1943), commonly known as Frank Rizzo Jr., is an American politician. He is the son of former Philadelphia Mayor Frank Rizzo and served as a Republican and briefly as an Independent member of the Philadelphia City Council for a combined sixteen years.

== Career ==
Rizzo, originally a Democrat, registered as a Republican to vote for his father, Frank Rizzo, in the 1987 Republican primary. He was elected to a Philadelphia City Council-at-Large seat in 1995. He defeated Councilwoman Joan Specter, wife of then-U.S. Senator Arlen Specter. He shares his father's support of labor and community organizations. The younger Rizzo easily won re-election as councilman-at-large in 1999, 2003 and 2007.

In 2011, he finished seventh out of nine candidates in the Republican primary, following his participation in the controversial Deferred Retirement Option Plan (DROP), under which he received a lump-sum payment from his city pension while continuing to receive his salary as a member of the city council. He was not a candidate in the general election. After his defeat, he left the Republican Party and became an independent.

In November 2013, he announced that he had rejoined the Democratic Party.
