= Bob O'Donnell =

American politician

Robert W. O'Donnell

83rd Speaker of the Pennsylvania House of Representatives
- In office January 23, 1990 – January 5, 1993
- Preceded by: James Manderino
- Succeeded by: Bill DeWeese

Member of the Pennsylvania House of Representatives from the 198th district
- In office January 2, 1973 – January 7, 1994
- Preceded by: David Savitt
- Succeeded by: Rosita Youngblood

Democratic Leader of the Pennsylvania House of Representatives
- In office January 3, 1989 – January 23, 1990
- Preceded by: James Manderino
- Succeeded by: Bill DeWeese

Democratic Whip of the Pennsylvania House of Representatives
- In office January 4, 1983 – November 30, 1988
- Preceded by: James Manderino
- Succeeded by: Bill DeWeese

Personal details
- Born: September 25, 1943 (age 82) Philadelphia, PA
- Party: Democratic

Robert W. O'Donnell (born September 25, 1943) is an American Democratic Party politician who is a former Speaker of the Pennsylvania House of Representatives.

O'Donnell was first elected to the Pennsylvania House of Representatives in 1974. He was the majority leader of the Pennsylvania House of Representatives from 1989–90, and was the speaker from 1990–92. He was elected in January 1990 following the death of James Manderino.

O'Donnell is a graduate of Temple University and earned a juris doctor.

In 1995, he formed O’Donnell Associates, a lobbying and governmental relations firm to represent business and governmental clients before state and local governments in Pennsylvania.

O’Donnell has had a distinguished career in law, government and politics before founding the firm. He was a member of the Pennsylvania House of Representatives for twenty years, having served as Speaker of the House, Majority Leader, Whip and Caucus Chairman. He is the author or prime sponsor of a number of significant and complex legislative proposals that have been enacted into law, including the Pennsylvania Intergovernmental Cooperation Authority Act (PICA) which was the vehicle for the financial recovery of the City of Philadelphia; the Municipal Pension Reform Act, which provided for the financial soundness of public pensions in Pennsylvania and legislation reforming insurance underwriting procedures. Speaker O’Donnell also introduced the first charter schools legislation in the Commonwealth, a version of which was passed later during Governor Tom Ridge's tenure.

A practicing attorney for thirty five years, O’Donnell’s area of specialization has been public finance and he has served as counsel to the firms of Saul Ewing in Philadelphia and Thorp, Reed and Armstrong, LLC in Pittsburgh.

O’Donnell has also been actively involved in all levels of politics and enjoys positive personal and professional relationships with the leadership of both political parties. He has served as President of the Electoral College of Pennsylvania and on the boards of directors of the Federal Home Loan Bank of Pittsburgh, Pennsylvania 2000, the University of Pittsburgh, National Conference of State Legislatures, Chesapeake Bay Commission, Commonwealth General State Authority, Joint State Government Commission, Philadelphia Port Corporation and the Pennsylvania Higher Education Facilities Authority.

In addition to its research and administrative employees, the firm enjoys strategic partnerships with firms and individuals based in Harrisburg whose specific expertise is used by the firm according to the client’s needs. The firm’s clients have included the School District of Philadelphia, the Pennsylvania Manufacturers Association, Keystone Mercy Health Plan, MBIA Insurance Corporation, The Pittsburgh Municipal Trust and PA Early Stage Partners. The firm’s principal office is located in Philadelphia.

== Sources ==
http://www.odonnellassociates.com

https://www.youtube.com/watch?v=Ijsr8oQCQIY
