= Kent Gates =

American politician

- Education: Penn State University
- Occupations: political consultant, campaign manager

Kent Gates is a Pennsylvania Republican political consultant, working with BrabenderCox.

He earned a master's degree from Penn State University.

He worked as campaign manager for Mike Fisher's 2002 gubernatorial campaign. He "really appeared on the political radar screen" when he managed Jim Roddey's upset victory for Allegheny County Chief Executive. He also managed Arlen Specter's 1998 victory He served as executive director of the Republican State Committee of Pennsylvania.

After several high-profile political victories at a young age, he was called a "wonder boy" and described as having "the political mind and experience of someone twice his age".

He was named to the "Sy Snyder's Power 50" list of politically powerful personalities in 2002. He was listed as one of "Pennsylvania's Top Operatives" by PoliticsPA. He was called one of "Pennsylvania's Smartest Staffers and Operatives" by PoliticsPA. He was named to the PoliticsPA list of "Republican Dream Team" campaign operatives.
