= Scott Savitt =

Scott Savitt is a former foreign correspondent for The Los Angeles Times and United Press International in Beijing. His articles have been published in The Los Angeles Times, Washington Post, Wall Street Journal, New York Times, and many other publications.

He has been interviewed on NPR, BBC, ABC’s Nightline and the CBS News. He is the in-house Chinese-English translator for numerous human rights organizations. In 1994, he founded Beijing Scene, China’s first independent English-language newspaper. In 2003 he published China Now magazine.

He is the founding editor of the award-winning Contexts magazine. He was a visiting scholar at Duke University and now lives with his family in Ann Arbor, Michigan.

== Books ==
Crashing the Party: An American Reporter in China (2016)
