= David Savitt =

American politician (1928–2018)

David N. Savitt

Member of the Pennsylvania House of Representatives from the 198th district
- In office January 7, 1969 – November 30, 1974
- Preceded by: District Created
- Succeeded by: Bob O'Donnell

Personal details
- Born: May 23, 1928 Philadelphia, Pennsylvania
- Died: October 23, 2018 (aged 90) Philadelphia, Pennsylvania
- Party: Democratic

David N. Savitt (May 23, 1928 – October 23, 2018) was a Democratic member of the Pennsylvania House of Representatives.
