= James J. Manderino =

American politician

82nd Speaker of the Pennsylvania House of Representatives

Member of the Pennsylvania House of Representatives
- In office January 3, 1989 – December 26, 1989
- Preceded by: K. Leroy Irvis
- Succeeded by: Bob O'Donnell

Member of the Pennsylvania House of Representatives

Member of the Pennsylvania House of Representatives from the 58th district
- In office January 7, 1969 – December 26, 1989
- Preceded by: District created
- Succeeded by: Herman Mihalich

Member of the Pennsylvania House of Representatives from the Westmoreland County district
- In office January 2, 1967 – November 30, 1968

Personal details
- Born: May 6, 1932 Monessen, Pennsylvania
- Died: December 26, 1989 (aged 57) Monessen, Pennsylvania
- Party: Democratic

James J. Manderino (May 6, 1932 – December 26, 1989) was an American Speaker of the Pennsylvania House of Representatives.

== Biography ==
James J. Manderino served as the 133rd Speaker of the Pennsylvania House of Representatives in 1989. He was a Democrat from Monessen, Westmoreland County. A member of the House for twenty-three years, from 1967 to 1989, he served eight years as Majority Leader and was elected Speaker in 1989 after the retirement of Rep. Leroy Irvis.

Manderino had five children and nine grandchildren. His daughter, Kathy Manderino, was the secretary of the Pennsylvania Department of Labor and Industry from May 2015 until August 2017, having previously served as a member of the Pennsylvania House of Representatives from Philadelphia from 1993 through 2010.

== Death and interment ==
Manderino died from a heart attack in Monessen, Pennsylvania on December 26, 1989, and was interred at a cemetery in Monessen.
