= Charleen Kinser =

American toy designer (1934–2008)

Charleen Kinser, c. 1991

Charleen Kinser (1934–2008) was an American toy designer, noted for her teddy bears. She founded the Forever Toys line of toys via her company Charleen Kinser Designs, and wrote three craft books in the 1970s.

== Early life, education and career ==
Kinser was born 1934 in Long Beach, California, where she went to school. She was an only child, and made her first toy when she was eight years old. She studied at the Chouinard Art Institute and worked with film animation at United Productions of America (UPA) and Disney. She became a director, worked with commercials, travelling to London and Paris. Her work was awarded at the Cannes Film Festival three times, for story, character and background design.

She also designed toys and exhibits for toy firms in Los Angeles and Chicago. She produced Mattel's first animated TV commercial in black and white, and designed stuffed toys for Sears. Not pleased with how these toys came out and the materials used for production, Kinser started thinking of making toys herself.

== Forever Toys ==
Kinser and her husband Bill settled in Boalsburg, Pennsylvania. She started designing her own toys, notably teddy bears. After having made a 5 ft (1.5 m) grizzly, "T.R.'s Bear" (T.R. for Teddy Roosevelt), for her daughter, the family started a company, Charleen Kinser Designs, initially making sew-it-yourself kits for bears and other toys. However, companies like Bloomingdales, their first customer, and Abercrombie & Fitch (A&F) preferred to order the finished products, named Forever Toys. Bill was the company's graphic designer, Maggie, their daughter, wrote background stories for the toys or "characters", and their son Tom designed and made wooden toys. By 1977, the company also included a small group of artisans, and expanded from the Kinser home to a converted bank barn. By 1993, 3,200 "T.R.'s Bear" had been sold.

Kinser wanted her toys to be durable, saying that "I'd like my bears and animals to be able to survive whatever they have to go through, from childhood rough-and-tumble to the traumas of going off to college or backpacking around Europe." Prices varied: a luxury mail order company offered a Forever Toys "Rocking Ram" at US$1,600 in 1985 (equivalent to $4,700 in 2024).

USA Today magazine said in 1993 that the line of "Live-in House Monsters" was "perhaps the most unusual ones on the market". Contemporary Doll's writer praised the Forever Toys, saying "unlike anything I had ever seen. Handsome enough to grace an art gallery ... totally fairy and utterly enchanting." Pittsburgh Post-Gazette's writer said of a Kinser teddy bear:

I am not ashamed to say I wanted Lulu. She's the only one left. I held her as if she were my newborn, but alas, she is Charleen Kinser's creation, one of 100 limited editions, and she is out of my price range at $300. She's adorable. ... I hope Lulu finds a good home. Most of all, I hope she isn't put on a shelf to be preserved. She was made to be hugged—a lot.

== Books ==
Kinser wrote three craft books in the 1970s. School Library Journal called her 1975 book Outdoor Art for Kids "a good source of ideas for science and art classes, schoolyard beautification projects, or after-school activities". Dubois Courier Express said of her 1977 book Sewing sculpture that "she coaxes you into expanding your visual awareness and encourages you to add your own style to her design ... a rarity in the crafts book field."

== Personal life ==
Charleen was married to Bill, and they had two children, Maggie and Tom. Bill had worked in design, advertising and as a teacher. Their 19-year-old son was found murdered in 1981, having disappeared ten months before. Bill died in 1999, and Charleen in 2008.

== Publications ==
- Kinser, Charleen (1975). Personally Yours, Needlepoint. Consolidated Book Publishers. ISBN 978-0-8326-2207-6.
- Kinser, Charleen (1975). Outdoor Art for Kids. Follett. ISBN 978-0-695-80533-3.
- Kinser, Charleen (1977). Sewing sculpture. Evans. ISBN 978-0-87131-236-5.

== See also ==
- Soft sculpture
