= BrabenderCox =

- Type: Corporation
- Industry: political consulting and advertising
- Founded: 1982
- Number of locations: Pittsburgh, Pennsylvania; Washington, D.C. Harrisburg, Pennsylvania
- Area served: Pennsylvania; United States
- Key people: John Brabender Founder; Rob Aho; Brian Nutt; Kent Gates; Hogan Gidley
- Website: http://www.brabendercox.com/

BrabenderCox is a nationally recognized Republican political consulting firm, with offices in Pittsburgh, Pennsylvania, Washington, D.C., and Harrisburg, Pennsylvania.

Founded as BrabenderCox, Inc. in 1982, BrabenderCox's Pittsburgh office is located on Mount Washington, which overlooks the skyline of Pittsburgh, Pennsylvania, and contains a mock electric chair that was once used in a prop for a political commercial.

Founder, John Brabender is managing partner and Chief Creative Officer of BrabenderCox. Brabender has been dubbed 'political guru' to Rick Santorum's political career. Brabender worked five of Santorum's Pennsylvania Congressional races, starting with his first House bid in 1990 and ending with his unsuccessful Senate re-election campaign in 2006. Brabender acted as Rick Santorum's senior strategist for his unsuccessful 2012 Republican Party presidential nomination bid.

Charlie Cook announced that "BrabenderCox has become one of the hottest Republican media firms", and in 1995 George magazine called BrabenderCox the "premier Republican spin doctors."

BrabenderCox also represents corporate clients, including the newly launched Pittsburgh Power Arena Football team. During the 2010 election cycle, BrabenderCox was successful in six of the top races across the country.
