= John Brabender =

American politician

- Born: Erie, Pennsylvania
- Education: Cathedral Preparatory School, Gannon University; Cleveland State University
- Occupations: political consultant, professor,

John Brabender is a political consultant who mostly advises Republicans but, has also advised Democratic candidates including Democrat Tom Knox, who ran for Philadelphia mayor. He earned a degree in from Gannon University and an MBA from Cleveland State University.

Brabender has been dubbed 'political guru' to Rick Santorum's political career. Bradender worked five of Santorum's Pennsylvania congressional races, starting with his first House bid in 1990 and ending with his failed Senate re-election campaign in 2006.

Bradbender acted as Rick Santorum's senior strategist for his failed 2012 Republican Party presidential nomination bid. He is godfather to one of Santorum's seven children.

Brabender is the managing partner and Chief Creative Officer of BrabenderCox, a national political consulting and advertising firm. He has served as a campaign and advertising consultant for campaigns including Tom Coburn, David Vitter, Rick Santorum, Linda Lingle, Tom Corbett, and for the 2008 Giuliani presidential campaign. He has also worked for the Pittsburgh Steelers in their attempt to gain public funding for Heinz Field in the mid-1990s and for the Pittsburgh Penguins.

He has appeared as a guest on The Today Show, CBS Evening News, NBC Nightly News, CNN's Inside Politics, Politically Incorrect, Talk of the Nation, and CNN.

He was an adjunct professor at the Perley Isaac Reed School of Journalism at West Virginia University, teaching courses on advertising and the media.

He was named one of the "Rising Stars of 1996" by Campaigns & Elections, after winning 18 of 21 races in the 1994 election cycle, including the 1994 U.S. Senate election in Pennsylvania where Rick Santorum upset Harris Wofford. He helped "mastermind" Tom Ridge's gubernatorial victories in 1994 and 1998.

He was named to the 2002 and 2003 PoliticsPA "Sy Snyder's Power 50" of influential people in Pennsylvania politics. He was named to the PoliticsPA list of "Republican Dream Team" political consultants. In 2010, he was named one of the "Top 10 Republicans" in Pennsylvania by Politics Magazine, where he was called "the go-to consultant for many [Pennsylvania] statewide candidates."

In 2009, he launched Zolitics, a "political entertainment network" with other political consultants, including Leslie Gromis-Baker.

During the 2016 presidential election, in response to an onslaught of celebrity PSAs favoring the Democratic Party's candidate, the most blatant of which was titled "Save the Day", he produced a "Save the Day Response" video mocking the perceived self-importance of celebrities making political statements.

In a 2019 Wall Street Journal op-ed, he predicted Joe Biden would not be elected president.
