= Jack Kelly (politician) =

American politician

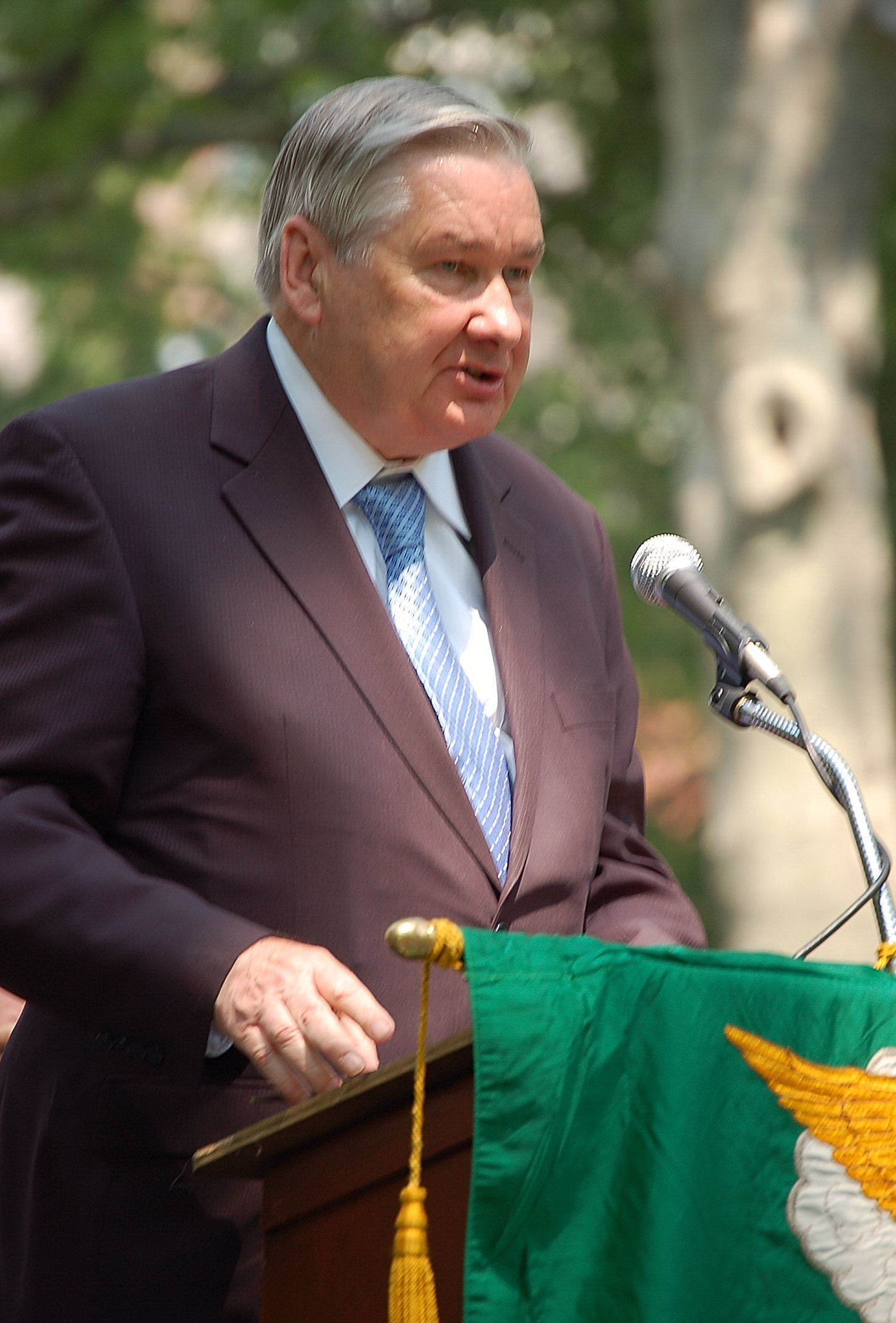
- Kelly in 2007

Member of the Philadelphia City Council from the at-large district
- In office July 15, 2004 – January 2, 2012
- Preceded by: Thacher Longstreth
- Succeeded by: David Oh

Member of the Philadelphia City Council from the 7th District
- In office January 4, 1988 – January 6, 1992
- Preceded by: Patricia Hughes
- Succeeded by: Daniel McElhatton

Personal details
- Party: Republican
- Spouse: Kathleen
- Children: 4

Jack Kelly is an American politician. He is a former Republican member of the Philadelphia City Council.

Kelly originally represented the seventh district on the council. In 1987, he defeated Democratic incumbent Patricia Hughes for the seat, but he was defeated in his bid for reelection four years later by Daniel McElhatton.

Following the death of longtime Republican councilman Thacher Longstreth, Kelly was elected to his at-large seat and served from 2004 to 2012.

== Political positions ==
Kelly is known as a supporter of animal rights. In 2006, he introduced legislation to prohibit the sale of force-fed animal products like foie gras due to animal cruelty concerns.

Local animal welfare organizations in Philadelphia present an annual Jack Kelly Leadership Award to public officials who advocate for improved treatment of animals. Kelly won the inaugural award in 2017.
