= Tom Knox =

American politician

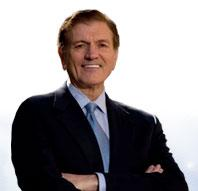

Personal details
- Party: Democratic
- Spouse: Linda
- Children: Two sons
- Occupation: Businessman

Tom Knox is an American businessman and politician. Knox became a millionaire through businesses in software, banking and health insurance. A Democrat, Knox ran for Mayor of Philadelphia in 2007 and briefly for Governor of Pennsylvania in 2010 before dropping out before the primary.

== Business career ==
A high school dropout who later earned a GED in the United States Navy, Knox was a successful entrepreneur who built an insurance advisory firm and sold it for nearly six million dollars in 1986. In the late 1980s he began buying and turning around underperforming companies.

Among his targets was Crusader Savings which he later sold to Royal Bank of Pennsylvania for seventeen million dollars. Knox was credited with significantly increasing the bank's income, though has been criticized for his methods. The bank's income increased through the use of payday loans which charge high interest rates and are under fire from a number of states. The Office of Thrift Supervision, one of the country's bank regulators, later expressed concerns over several of the bank's businesses, including the payday lending business.

In 1999, Knox acquired Fidelity Insurance Group, a Maryland health insurance firm which he sold to UnitedHealth Group in 2004 for a gain of over twenty million dollars. After the acquisition, Knox became the CEO of UnitedHealthcare of Pennsylvania, a UHG subsidiary. He resigned his position in 2006 in order to run for mayor.

In April 2013, Knox sued Table 31, a steakhouse at the Comcast Center, in part because the restaurant discontinued his meal discount. Knox, an investor in the restaurant, said that the discounted meals were part of the original partnership agreement.

== Political career ==
Knox briefly interrupted his business career to serve as Deputy Mayor for Management and Productivity under then-Mayor Ed Rendell. He served for one and a half years, accepting only one dollar a year in salary. Rendell credited Knox with helping to save the city seven million dollars on better leases for office space. Knox was also involved in negotiating lower health care costs for city employees. Knox has been a major contributor and fund-raiser for various local politicians.

In December 2006, Knox announced his campaign for mayor and lent five million dollars to his campaign. In response to criticism that he was trying to buy City Hall, Knox replied that he was trying to "buy City Hall back for the people of Philadelphia". He pledged to spend up to fifteen million dollars of his own money in the race. Thanks to his cash advantage, Knox was one of the first candidates to go on the air with television commercials. The early advertising, which attacked city corruption and high business taxes, proved to be significant in raising Knox's poll numbers from 1% to 25%, and placed him in first place for the first time in March 2007.

Knox's business practices came under increasing criticism during the campaign. The Philadelphia Daily News reported that his insurance company was fined $125,000 in Maryland for a number of violations including hiring a compliance officer who had a felony record for embezzlement. In addition, other candidates have attacked his lack of experience in government and the payday loan practices of his bank. Several 527 groups were created with funding from union sources and from supporters of candidate Rep. Bob Brady. However, local television stations refused to run the ads, requesting more documentation of the charges against Knox. The new '527' money did prompt Knox to put another $3 million of his own money into the race to counter the ads, which raised his personal total to $8 million. Knox finished second in the Democratic primary with 25% of the vote, losing to Michael Nutter.

In August 2008, Knox announced his candidacy for Pennsylvania's 2010 gubernatorial election; he dropped out of the race in January 2010, giving his support to Allegheny County Executive Dan Onorato. Knox was considered a potential candidate for governor in 2014, or for mayor of Philadelphia in 2015, but decided against both, signaling a possible end to his political aspirations.

In 2022, Knox served as assistant treasurer for the Pennsylvania for Pennsylvania PAC, backing Republican US Senate candidate George Bochetto. Knox said the PAC planned to raise $5 million and that he planned to contribute "a significant amount."

== Personal ==
Knox was raised in public housing in the East Falls neighborhood of the city. He currently lives in Rittenhouse Square, Philadelphia. Knox purchased three units in the high-rise condo Residences at Two Liberty Place with plans to convert them into a single 5,500-square-foot (510 m^{2}) unit on the 46th floor. He is married to Linda Knox, and together they have two sons.
