= 2015 Philadelphia mayoral election =

- November 3, 2015
- Turnout: 21.84% ▲
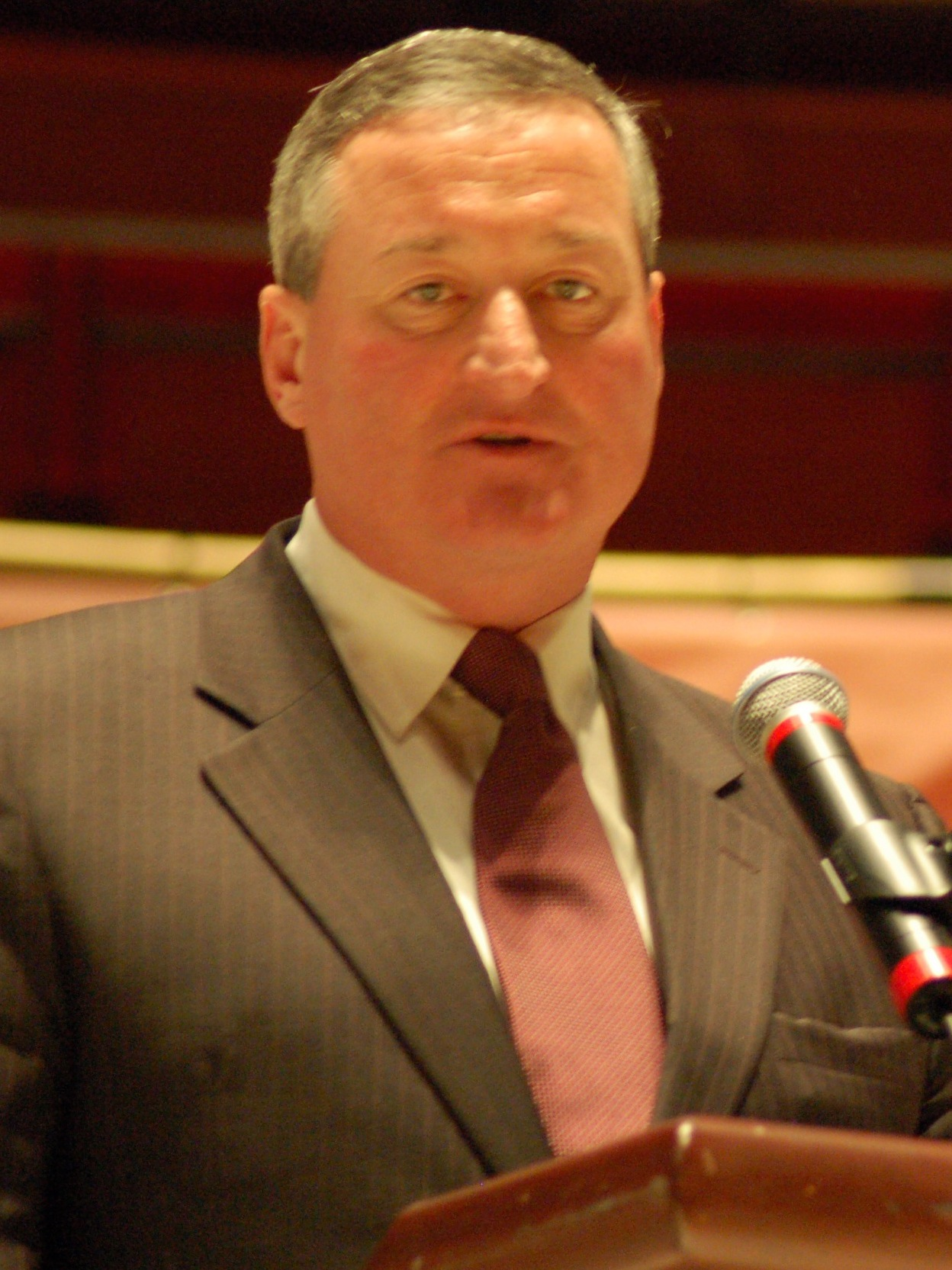

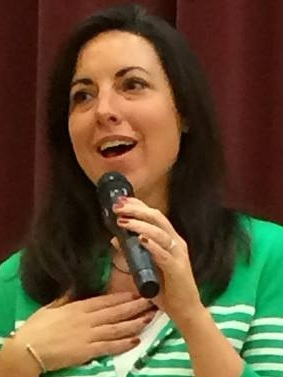
Nominee	Jim Kenney	Melissa Murray Bailey
Party	Democratic	Republican
Popular vote	203,730	31,563
Percentage	85.36%	13.23%
- Kenney: 50–60% 60–70% 70–80% 80–90% >90% Bailey: 50–60%
Mayor before election
Michael Nutter
Democratic
Elected mayor
Jim Kenney
Democratic

The 2015 Philadelphia mayoral election was held on November 3, 2015, to elect the Mayor of Philadelphia, Pennsylvania, concurrently with various other state and local elections. Heavily favored Democratic party candidate Jim Kenney won.

Incumbent Democratic party Mayor Michael Nutter could not run for re-election to a third consecutive term due to term limits in the city's home rule charter. Registered Democrats hold a formidable 7-to-1 ratio over registered Republicans in Philadelphia, giving Democratic candidates a distinct advantage in citywide elections.

The mayoral primary elections were held on May 19, 2015. 27% of the city's registered voters voted in the primaries. Democrats nominated Jim Kenney, a member of the Philadelphia City Council, as their party's nominee. Kenney won the primary in a landslide with 55.83% of the vote, defeating a crowded field of five other Democratic candidates, including Anthony H. Williams and former District Attorney Lynne Abraham. Republican Melissa Murray Bailey, a business executive, ran unopposed for the Republican nomination. Had she been elected, Bailey would have become Philadelphia's first female mayor, as well as the city's first Republican mayor in more than 60 years.

== Democratic primary ==
=== Candidates ===
==== Declared ====
- Lynne Abraham, former District Attorney of Philadelphia
- Nelson Diaz, former City Solicitor and former Common Pleas judge
- James F. Kenney, former Philadelphia City Councilman
- Doug Oliver, Vice President of Marketing and Corporate Communications at Philadelphia Gas Works and former press secretary for Mayor Nutter
- Milton Street, former State Senator and candidate for Mayor in 2011
- Anthony H. Williams, Minority Whip of the Pennsylvania State Senate and candidate for governor in 2010

==== Withdrew ====
- Jon Bell
- Terry Gillen, former Philadelphia Director of Federal Affairs and former executive director of the Philadelphia Redevelopment Authority
- Keith Goodman, pastor and candidate for Chester City Council in 2005
- Ken Trujillo, former City Solicitor

==== Declined ====
- Alan Butkovitz, Philadelphia City Controller
- Darrell L. Clarke, Philadelphia City Council President
- Dwight E. Evans, State Representative, candidate for lieutenant governor in 1986, candidate for Governor in 1994 and candidate for Mayor in 1999 and 2007
- Bill Green, former Philadelphia City Councilman and chair of the Philadelphia School Reform Commission
- Renée Cardwell Hughes, chief executive officer of the Southeastern Pennsylvania Red Cross and former Common Pleas judge
- Kevin R. Johnson, Philadelphia clergyman and pastor of Bright Hope Baptist Church
- Sam Katz, businessman, public finance executive and Republican nominee for Mayor in 1999 and 2003
- Tom Knox, businessman, candidate for Mayor in 2007 and candidate for Governor in 2010
- Alba Martinez, former city Human Services Commissioner and former CEO of the United Way of Southeastern Pennsylvania
- Richard Negrin, Philadelphia Managing Director
- Frank L. Rizzo, Jr., former Republican Philadelphia City Councilman (running for the City Council)
- Jonathan Saidel, former Philadelphia City Controller
- R. Seth Williams, District Attorney of Philadelphia

=== Polling ===
Poll source	Date(s) administered	Sample size	Margin of error	Alan Butkovitz	Darrell Clarke	James Kenney	Frank Rizzo	Milton Street	Ken Trujillo	Anthony Williams	Refused
Public Policy Polling*	May 27–28, 2014	916	± 3.2%	12%	14%	7%	10%	4%	1%	2%	41%
Public Policy Polling*	May 27–28, 2014	916	± 3.2%	22%	—	—	—	—	—	11%	67%

- * Internal poll for the Alan Butkovitz campaign

Poll source	Date(s) administered	Sample size	Margin of error	James Kenney	Anthony Williams	Lynne Abraham	Undecided	Other
GBA Strategies*	April 9–15, 2015	587	± 4.1%	26%	25%	22%	18%	9%

- * AFSCME poll for the James Kenney campaign.

Poll source	Date(s) administered	Sample size	Margin of error	James Kenney	Anthony Williams	Lynne Abraham	Milton Street	Nelson Diaz	Doug Oliver	Undecided	Other
Public Policy Polling*	released April 6, 2015	644	± 3.7%	26%	25%	20%	4%	3%	3%	19%	

- * Public Policy Polling poll for the James Kenney campaign.

=== Results ===
Democratic primary results by ward Kenney: 30%–40%; 40%–50%; 50%–60%; 60%–70%; 70%–80%; 80%–90%; Williams: 40%–50%; 50%–60%; Diaz: 40%–50%

Democratic primary results
Party	Candidate	Votes	%
Democratic	James F. Kenney	130,775	55.81
Democratic	Anthony H. Williams	61,160	26.10
Democratic	Lynne Abraham	19,782	8.44
Democratic	Doug Oliver	9,934	4.24
Democratic	Nelson Diaz	8,691	3.71
Democratic	Milton Street	3,937	1.68
Democratic	Write-in	24	0.01
Total votes		234,303	100.00

Results by ward

Ward	Kenney		Williams		Abraham		Oliver		Diaz		Street		Write-in		Total votes
Ward	#	%	#	%	#	%	#	%	#	%	#	%	#	%	Total votes
1	2,865	83.09%	181	5.25%	237	6.87%	71	2.06%	77	2.23%	17	0.49%	0	0.00%	3,448
2	3,576	72.55%	503	10.20%	520	10.55%	151	3.06%	140	2.84%	36	0.73%	3	0.06%	4,929
3	1,274	30.97%	2,448	59.50%	134	3.26%	147	3.57%	46	1.12%	65	1.58%	0	0.00%	4,114
4	1,369	34.84%	2,077	52.86%	158	4.02%	176	4.48%	65	1.65%	84	2.14%	0	0.00%	3,929
5	3,750	68.07%	478	8.68%	831	15.08%	214	3.88%	206	3.74%	27	0.49%	3	0.05%	5,509
6	1,020	42.62%	1,022	42.71%	125	5.22%	101	4.22%	57	2.38%	68	2.84%	0	0.00%	2,393
7	404	28.73%	238	16.93%	88	6.26%	27	1.92%	601	42.75%	48	3.41%	0	0.00%	1,406
8	3,772	63.42%	619	10.41%	1,117	18.78%	231	3.88%	187	3.14%	21	0.35%	1	0.02%	5,948
9	2,959	69.99%	428	10.12%	436	10.31%	195	4.61%	195	4.61%	14	0.33%	1	0.02%	4,228
10	3,583	58.72%	1,692	27.73%	247	4.05%	365	5.98%	103	1.69%	112	1.84%	0	0.00%	6,102
11	1,073	44.50%	986	40.90%	91	3.77%	127	5.27%	40	1.66%	94	3.90%	0	0.00%	2,411
12	1,990	48.27%	1,348	32.69%	229	5.55%	329	7.98%	106	2.57%	121	2.93%	0	0.00%	4,123
13	1,823	48.13%	1,317	34.77%	201	5.31%	237	6.26%	86	2.27%	124	3.27%	0	0.00%	3,788
14	551	39.27%	598	42.62%	80	5.70%	85	6.06%	46	3.28%	43	3.06%	0	0.00%	1,403
15	2,385	64.93%	393	10.70%	534	14.54%	162	4.41%	161	4.38%	38	1.03%	0	0.00%	3,673
16	695	36.01%	912	47.25%	99	5.13%	95	4.92%	28	1.45%	101	5.23%	0	0.00%	1,930
17	2,182	44.71%	1,987	40.72%	185	3.79%	317	6.50%	98	2.01%	110	2.25%	1	0.02%	4,880
18	1,425	64.25%	171	7.71%	197	8.88%	78	3.52%	323	14.56%	24	1.08%	0	0.00%	2,218
19	691	42.06%	269	16.37%	82	4.99%	19	1.16%	548	33.35%	34	2.07%	0	0.00%	1,643
20	460	39.42%	472	40.45%	54	4.63%	61	5.23%	77	6.60%	43	3.68%	0	0.00%	1,167
21	4,654	70.56%	557	8.44%	923	13.99%	258	3.91%	159	2.41%	45	0.68%	0	0.00%	6,596
22	4,043	60.33%	1,470	21.93%	345	5.15%	520	7.76%	225	3.36%	98	1.46%	1	0.01%	6,702
23	1,421	55.68%	607	23.79%	214	8.39%	116	4.55%	152	5.96%	41	1.61%	1	0.04%	2,552
24	759	41.07%	808	43.72%	94	5.09%	92	4.98%	41	2.22%	54	2.92%	0	0.00%	1,848
25	927	64.29%	196	13.59%	176	12.21%	24	1.66%	100	6.93%	19	1.32%	0	0.00%	1,442
26	3,068	86.23%	112	3.15%	295	8.29%	43	1.21%	31	0.87%	9	0.25%	0	0.00%	3,558
27	898	56.34%	468	29.36%	85	5.33%	52	3.26%	67	4.20%	24	1.51%	0	0.00%	1,594
28	899	43.60%	858	41.61%	104	5.04%	104	5.04%	27	1.31%	70	3.39%	0	0.00%	2,062
29	927	48.01%	707	36.61%	85	4.40%	119	6.16%	28	1.45%	65	3.37%	0	0.00%	1,931
30	2,456	65.81%	650	17.42%	327	8.76%	158	4.23%	90	2.41%	51	1.37%	0	0.00%	3,732
31	1,422	76.21%	109	5.84%	173	9.27%	62	3.32%	83	4.45%	17	0.91%	0	0.00%	1,866
32	1,344	44.27%	1,251	41.21%	126	4.15%	153	5.04%	49	1.61%	113	3.72%	0	0.00%	3,036
33	652	40.62%	327	20.37%	159	9.91%	42	2.62%	380	23.68%	45	2.80%	0	0.00%	1,605
34	3,326	42.01%	3,448	43.55%	454	5.73%	400	5.05%	154	1.95%	135	1.71%	0	0.00%	7,917
35	1,755	52.14%	834	24.78%	344	10.22%	170	5.05%	199	5.91%	64	1.90%	0	0.00%	3,366
36	2,511	42.31%	2,683	45.21%	271	4.57%	228	3.84%	86	1.45%	154	2.59%	2	0.03%	5,935
37	541	27.87%	852	43.89%	116	5.98%	71	3.66%	279	14.37%	82	4.22%	0	0.00%	1,941
38	1,561	47.23%	1,134	34.31%	285	8.62%	198	5.99%	56	1.69%	71	2.15%	0	0.00%	3,305
39	6,874	87.15%	315	3.99%	466	5.91%	121	1.53%	83	1.05%	27	0.34%	2	0.03%	7,888
40	3,099	42.98%	3,252	45.10%	325	4.51%	233	3.23%	92	1.28%	209	2.90%	0	0.00%	7,210
41	1,384	65.44%	239	11.30%	355	16.78%	44	2.08%	61	2.88%	32	1.51%	0	0.00%	2,115
42	1,346	45.81%	735	25.02%	162	5.51%	135	4.59%	495	16.85%	64	2.18%	1	0.03%	2,938
43	888	37.28%	737	30.94%	104	4.37%	122	5.12%	452	18.98%	79	3.32%	0	0.00%	2,382
44	833	32.53%	1,384	54.04%	102	3.98%	122	4.76%	41	1.60%	77	3.01%	2	0.08%	2,561
45	1,278	65.74%	169	8.69%	342	17.59%	35	1.80%	100	5.14%	20	1.03%	0	0.00%	1,944
46	2,423	54.73%	1,445	32.64%	204	4.61%	161	3.64%	134	3.03%	60	1.36%	0	0.00%	4,427
47	473	48.22%	332	33.84%	46	4.69%	72	7.34%	20	2.04%	38	3.87%	0	0.00%	981
48	1,336	45.85%	1,200	41.18%	170	5.83%	86	2.95%	52	1.78%	70	2.40%	0	0.00%	2,914
49	1,725	40.36%	1,783	41.72%	220	5.15%	291	6.81%	162	3.79%	93	2.18%	0	0.00%	4,274
50	4,447	58.44%	2,124	27.91%	285	3.75%	505	6.64%	145	1.91%	102	1.34%	2	0.03%	7,610
51	1,288	31.61%	2,385	58.53%	128	3.14%	114	2.80%	70	1.72%	90	2.21%	0	0.00%	4,075
52	2,666	45.52%	2,232	38.11%	367	6.27%	344	5.87%	138	2.36%	110	1.88%	0	0.00%	5,857
53	1,363	59.21%	391	16.99%	323	14.03%	92	4.00%	109	4.74%	24	1.04%	0	0.00%	2,302
54	858	55.11%	280	17.98%	256	16.44%	62	3.98%	79	5.07%	22	1.41%	0	0.00%	1,557
55	1,999	72.27%	220	7.95%	411	14.86%	49	1.77%	66	2.39%	20	0.72%	1	0.04%	2,766
56	2,582	60.90%	362	8.54%	1,042	24.58%	80	1.89%	147	3.47%	27	0.64%	0	0.00%	4,240
57	2,574	75.71%	240	7.06%	488	14.35%	46	1.35%	43	1.26%	9	0.26%	0	0.00%	3,400
58	3,713	72.24%	337	6.56%	926	18.02%	57	1.11%	80	1.56%	26	0.51%	1	0.02%	5,140
59	2,177	52.31%	1,259	30.25%	222	5.33%	321	7.71%	97	2.33%	85	2.04%	1	0.02%	4,162
60	1,199	33.37%	1,919	53.41%	142	3.95%	170	4.73%	68	1.89%	95	2.64%	0	0.00%	3,593
61	2,112	48.96%	1,282	29.72%	257	5.96%	384	8.90%	189	4.38%	90	2.09%	0	0.00%	4,314
62	1,481	56.77%	548	21.00%	282	10.81%	100	3.83%	158	6.06%	40	1.53%	0	0.00%	2,609
63	2,441	74.49%	175	5.34%	538	16.42%	57	1.74%	59	1.80%	7	0.21%	0	0.00%	3,277
64	1,330	76.70%	109	6.29%	221	12.75%	24	1.38%	37	2.13%	13	0.75%	0	0.00%	1,734
65	2,114	70.40%	220	7.33%	548	18.25%	52	1.73%	55	1.83%	14	0.47%	0	0.00%	3,003
66	3,761	78.35%	276	5.75%	629	13.10%	57	1.19%	63	1.31%	13	0.27%	1	0.02%	4,800

== Republican primary ==
=== Candidates ===
==== Declared ====
- Melissa Murray Bailey, businesswoman

==== Declined ====
- Ronald D. Castille, former Chief Justice of the Supreme Court of Pennsylvania, former District Attorney of Philadelphia and candidate for Mayor in 1991
- Sean Clark, nonprofit executive
- Allan Domb, real estate developer and President of the Greater Philadelphia Association of Realtors
- Rhashea Harmon, attorney and nominee for the State Senate in 2010 (running as an Independent)
- Kelvin Jeremiah, President & CEO of the Philadelphia Housing Authority
- Sam Katz, businessman, public finance executive and Republican nominee for Mayor in 1999 and 2003
- Elmer Money, candidate for City Council in 2011
- Doug Oliver, Vice President of Marketing and Corporate Communications at Philadelphia Gas Works and former press secretary for Mayor Nutter (running as a Democrat)
- Dana Spain, businesswoman and philanthropist

=== Results ===
Republican primary results
Party	Candidate	Votes	%
Republican	Melissa Murray Bailey	12,632	99.49
Republican	Write-in	65	0.51
Total votes		12,697	100.00

== Independent ==
=== Candidates ===
==== Declared ====
- Rhashea Harmon, attorney and Republican nominee for the State Senate in 2010

==== Declined ====
- Bill Green, former Philadelphia City Councilman and former chair of the Philadelphia School Reform Commission
- Sam Katz, businessman, public finance executive and Republican nominee for Mayor in 1999 and 2003
- Dana Spain, businesswoman and philanthropist

== General election ==
=== Candidates ===
- Melissa Murray Bailey – Republican Party
- James Foster – Independent
- Osborne Hart – Socialist Workers Party
- Jim Kenney – Democratic Party
- Boris Kindij – Independent

=== Results ===
2015 Philadelphia mayoral election
Party	Candidate	Votes	%
Democratic	Jim Kenney	203,730	85.36
Republican	Melissa Murray Bailey	31,563	13.23
Independent	James Foster	1,713	0.72
Socialist Workers	Osborne Hart	1,234	0.52
Independent	Boris Kindij	321	0.13
Write-in		103	0.04
Total votes		238,664	100.00
Democratic hold			

Results by Ward

Ward	Kenney		Bailey		Foster		Hart		Kindij		Write-in		Total votes
Ward	#	%	#	%	#	%	#	%	#	%	#	%	Total votes
1	3,448	88.12%	387	9.89%	30	0.77%	36	0.92%	11	0.28%	1	0.03%	3,913
2	4,742	85.44%	672	12.11%	65	1.17%	57	1.03%	10	0.18%	4	0.07%	5,550
3	3,179	96.45%	98	2.97%	11	0.33%	5	0.15%	3	0.09%	0	0.00%	3,296
4	3,097	96.60%	79	2.46%	22	0.69%	3	0.09%	4	0.12%	1	0.03%	3,206
5	5,522	81.58%	1,097	16.21%	85	1.26%	47	0.69%	13	0.19%	5	0.07%	6,769
6	2,001	95.15%	80	3.80%	11	0.52%	8	0.38%	2	0.10%	1	0.05%	2,103
7	1,064	92.36%	79	6.86%	5	0.43%	1	0.09%	2	0.17%	1	0.09%	1,152
8	5,603	80.51%	1,219	17.52%	72	1.03%	47	0.68%	14	0.20%	4	0.06%	6,959
9	3,977	82.22%	686	14.18%	113	2.34%	51	1.05%	7	0.14%	3	0.06%	4,837
10	5,148	97.41%	102	1.93%	29	0.55%	3	0.06%	3	0.06%	0	0.00%	5,285
11	2,057	96.03%	67	3.13%	8	0.37%	6	0.28%	3	0.14%	1	0.05%	2,142
12	3,296	93.11%	147	4.15%	62	1.75%	31	0.88%	4	0.11%	0	0.00%	3,540
13	3,118	95.97%	99	3.05%	20	0.62%	8	0.25%	2	0.06%	2	0.06%	3,249
14	1,266	94.62%	58	4.33%	6	0.45%	5	0.37%	3	0.22%	0	0.00%	1,338
15	3,402	80.98%	697	16.59%	40	0.95%	47	1.12%	11	0.26%	4	0.10%	4,201
16	1,469	95.64%	60	3.91%	3	0.20%	3	0.20%	1	0.07%	0	0.00%	1,536
17	3,993	96.52%	123	2.97%	14	0.34%	6	0.15%	1	0.02%	0	0.00%	4,137
18	2,214	84.31%	319	12.15%	36	1.37%	44	1.68%	11	0.42%	2	0.08%	2,626
19	1,182	94.86%	58	4.65%	3	0.24%	2	0.16%	1	0.08%	0	0.00%	1,246
20	1,009	95.19%	41	3.87%	2	0.19%	7	0.66%	1	0.09%	0	0.00%	1,060
21	6,187	72.93%	2,127	25.07%	92	1.08%	63	0.74%	11	0.13%	3	0.04%	8,483
22	5,887	92.30%	321	5.03%	110	1.72%	49	0.77%	8	0.13%	3	0.05%	6,378
23	2,134	85.19%	344	13.73%	15	0.60%	6	0.24%	4	0.16%	2	0.08%	2,505
24	1,670	92.62%	98	5.44%	8	0.44%	20	1.11%	7	0.39%	0	0.00%	1,803
25	1,324	72.23%	468	25.53%	13	0.71%	16	0.87%	8	0.44%	4	0.22%	1,833
26	3,109	78.95%	788	20.01%	23	0.58%	15	0.38%	2	0.05%	1	0.03%	3,938
27	1,696	89.55%	133	7.02%	20	1.06%	39	2.06%	4	0.21%	2	0.11%	1,894
28	1,763	96.92%	46	2.53%	3	0.16%	5	0.27%	2	0.11%	0	0.00%	1,819
29	1,626	93.77%	89	5.13%	9	0.52%	5	0.29%	4	0.23%	1	0.06%	1,734
30	3,071	86.97%	400	11.33%	32	0.91%	20	0.57%	3	0.08%	5	0.14%	3,531
31	2,037	80.55%	392	15.50%	27	1.07%	60	2.37%	7	0.28%	6	0.24%	2,529
32	2,526	95.61%	91	3.44%	18	0.68%	5	0.19%	1	0.04%	1	0.04%	2,642
33	1,159	84.23%	204	14.83%	3	0.22%	6	0.44%	2	0.15%	2	0.15%	1,376
34	6,650	94.63%	316	4.50%	31	0.44%	22	0.31%	7	0.10%	1	0.01%	7,027
35	2,988	82.66%	596	16.49%	22	0.61%	5	0.14%	4	0.11%	0	0.00%	3,615
36	4,653	94.23%	223	4.52%	24	0.49%	27	0.55%	10	0.20%	1	0.02%	4,938
37	1,695	96.97%	39	2.23%	6	0.34%	4	0.23%	3	0.17%	1	0.06%	1,748
38	2,904	88.08%	340	10.31%	23	0.70%	20	0.61%	7	0.21%	3	0.09%	3,297
39	7,212	88.93%	796	9.82%	32	0.39%	53	0.65%	12	0.15%	5	0.06%	8,110
40	5,285	94.56%	277	4.96%	19	0.34%	7	0.13%	0	0.00%	1	0.02%	5,589
41	1,708	74.04%	568	24.62%	21	0.91%	4	0.17%	4	0.17%	2	0.09%	2,307
42	2,321	92.25%	167	6.64%	20	0.79%	5	0.20%	3	0.12%	0	0.00%	2,516
43	1,728	94.17%	94	5.12%	10	0.54%	3	0.16%	0	0.00%	0	0.00%	1,835
44	2,111	96.52%	57	2.61%	7	0.32%	8	0.37%	3	0.14%	1	0.05%	2,187
45	1,801	66.83%	871	32.32%	14	0.52%	6	0.22%	3	0.11%	0	0.00%	2,695
46	4,057	92.48%	183	4.17%	31	0.71%	109	2.48%	6	0.14%	1	0.02%	4,387
47	841	93.44%	47	5.22%	2	0.22%	6	0.67%	4	0.44%	0	0.00%	900
48	2,347	91.18%	203	7.89%	8	0.31%	13	0.51%	2	0.08%	1	0.04%	2,574
49	3,587	94.94%	163	4.31%	20	0.53%	7	0.19%	1	0.03%	0	0.00%	3,778
50	6,509	96.24%	202	2.99%	30	0.44%	12	0.18%	10	0.15%	0	0.00%	6,763
51	3,177	95.72%	98	2.95%	14	0.42%	21	0.63%	9	0.27%	0	0.00%	3,319
52	4,891	93.79%	278	5.33%	30	0.58%	11	0.21%	3	0.06%	2	0.04%	5,215
53	1,980	79.39%	489	19.61%	12	0.48%	8	0.32%	4	0.16%	1	0.04%	2,494
54	1,271	84.85%	212	14.15%	3	0.20%	9	0.60%	1	0.07%	2	0.13%	1,498
55	2,521	69.93%	1,048	29.07%	20	0.55%	11	0.31%	4	0.11%	1	0.03%	3,605
56	3,820	70.91%	1,518	28.18%	29	0.54%	13	0.24%	4	0.07%	3	0.06%	5,387
57	3,039	67.93%	1,396	31.20%	26	0.58%	4	0.09%	6	0.13%	3	0.07%	4,474
58	4,814	66.80%	2,318	32.16%	49	0.68%	17	0.24%	7	0.10%	2	0.03%	7,207
59	3,579	93.28%	180	4.69%	46	1.20%	25	0.65%	7	0.18%	0	0.00%	3,837
60	2,899	95.08%	113	3.71%	16	0.52%	15	0.49%	5	0.16%	1	0.03%	3,049
61	3,656	92.79%	249	6.32%	21	0.53%	12	0.30%	2	0.05%	0	0.00%	3,940
62	2,163	84.49%	385	15.04%	7	0.27%	3	0.12%	1	0.04%	1	0.04%	2,560
63	3,226	63.89%	1,778	35.21%	30	0.59%	11	0.22%	2	0.04%	2	0.04%	5,049
64	1,708	62.91%	975	35.91%	23	0.85%	7	0.26%	2	0.07%	0	0.00%	2,715
65	2,546	69.02%	1,094	29.66%	24	0.65%	15	0.41%	6	0.16%	4	0.11%	3,689
66	5,067	65.38%	2,621	33.82%	33	0.43%	15	0.19%	9	0.12%	5	0.06%	7,750
