= 2019 Philadelphia mayoral election =

- November 5, 2019
- Turnout: 26.74% ▲
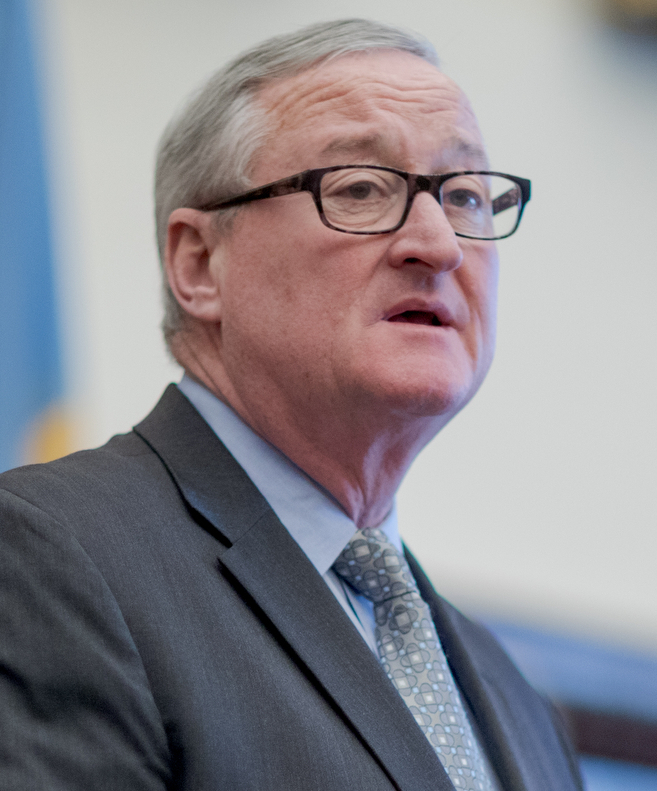

Candidate	Jim Kenney	Billy Ciancaglini
Party	Democratic	Republican
Popular vote	234,749	56,710
Percentage	80.33%	19.41%
- Kenney: 50–60% 60–70% 70–80% 80–90% >90% Ciancaglini: 50–60% 60–70% 70–80% 80–90% Tie: 50%
Mayor before election
Jim Kenney
Democratic
Elected mayor
Jim Kenney
Democratic

The 2019 Philadelphia mayoral election was held on November 5, 2019, to elect the mayor of Philadelphia, Pennsylvania. Incumbent mayor Jim Kenney, first elected in 2015, ran for reelection.

Kenney's platform included raising the minimum wage to $15 per hour, providing city support for the maintenance of supervised injection sites, implementing a city soda tax, and ensuring the city's compliance with the Paris Climate Agreement. Ciancaglini promised to end Philadelphia's status as a sanctuary city and cancel plans to establish the supervised injection sites.

== Background ==
No Republican had won a Philadelphia mayoral election since Bernard Samuel in 1947.

Kenney easily won in his bid for re-election to a second term; however, this was the first election since the nationally controversial 2003 election in which the Republican nominee managed to carry a ward, with Ciancaglini carrying slightly fewer wards than 2003 Republican nominee Sam Katz. Despite an easy landslide victory, there was increased dissatisfaction with Kenney and his administration, which continued months after the election.

== Democratic primary ==
=== Candidates ===
- Jim Kenney, Incumbent
- Alan Butkovitz, former Philadelphia City Controller
- Anthony H. Williams, Minority Whip of the Pennsylvania State Senate, candidate for mayor in 2015 and for governor in 2010.

=== Results ===
Democratic primary results by ward Kenney: 40%–50%; 50%–60%; 60%–70%; 70%–80%; 80%–90%; Williams: 40%–50%

Mayor of Philadelphia, Democratic primary, 2019
Party	Candidate	Votes	%
Democratic	Jim Kenney (incumbent)	131,930	66.90
Democratic	Anthony H. Williams	48,012	24.35
Democratic	Alan Butkovitz	17,219	8.73
Write-in		52	0.03
Total votes		197,213	100.00

Results by Ward

Ward	Kenney		Williams		Butkovitz		Write-in		Total votes
Ward	#	%	#	%	#	%	#	%	Total votes
1	2,666	78.32%	390	11.46%	345	10.14%	3	0.09%	3,404
2	4,654	84.27%	524	9.49%	342	6.19%	3	0.05%	5,523
3	1,663	47.60%	1,731	49.54%	100	2.86%	0	0.00%	3,494
4	1,733	56.25%	1,230	39.92%	118	3.83%	0	0.00%	3,081
5	5,314	83.61%	567	8.92%	473	7.44%	2	0.03%	6,356
6	1,337	59.37%	821	36.46%	93	4.13%	1	0.04%	2,252
7	746	74.97%	176	17.69%	72	7.24%	1	0.10%	995
8	5,682	83.02%	627	9.16%	533	7.79%	2	0.03%	6,844
9	3,807	86.29%	399	9.04%	206	4.67%	0	0.00%	4,412
10	3,566	69.89%	1,406	27.56%	130	2.55%	0	0.00%	5,102
11	1,207	62.64%	636	33.00%	84	4.36%	0	0.00%	1,927
12	2,311	66.56%	1,007	29.00%	153	4.41%	1	0.03%	3,472
13	1,964	63.91%	972	31.63%	137	4.46%	0	0.00%	3,073
14	977	71.16%	327	23.82%	69	5.03%	0	0.00%	1,373
15	3,305	81.46%	386	9.51%	366	9.02%	0	0.00%	4,057
16	880	62.95%	467	33.40%	51	3.65%	0	0.00%	1,398
17	2,489	64.25%	1,230	31.75%	155	4.00%	0	0.00%	3,874
18	2,163	77.81%	349	12.55%	264	9.50%	4	0.14%	2,780
19	918	77.27%	207	17.42%	63	5.30%	0	0.00%	1,188
20	666	68.10%	280	28.63%	32	3.27%	0	0.00%	978
21	4,452	72.95%	890	14.58%	759	12.44%	2	0.03%	6,103
22	4,709	74.44%	1,382	21.85%	235	3.71%	0	0.00%	6,326
23	1,293	63.60%	550	27.05%	190	9.35%	0	0.00%	2,033
24	1,425	68.08%	550	26.28%	118	5.64%	0	0.00%	2,093
25	662	56.48%	263	22.44%	246	20.99%	1	0.09%	1,172
26	1,254	54.69%	516	22.50%	522	22.76%	1	0.04%	2,293
27	1,725	79.27%	359	16.50%	90	4.14%	2	0.09%	2,176
28	1,042	62.88%	532	32.11%	83	5.01%	0	0.00%	1,657
29	1,237	72.51%	405	23.74%	64	3.75%	0	0.00%	1,706
30	3,075	82.62%	422	11.34%	224	6.02%	1	0.03%	3,722
31	1,887	80.26%	244	10.38%	217	9.23%	3	0.13%	2,351
32	1,567	64.14%	780	31.93%	96	3.93%	0	0.00%	2,443
33	772	66.15%	269	23.05%	125	10.71%	1	0.09%	1,167
34	3,802	55.44%	2,788	40.65%	267	3.89%	1	0.01%	6,858
35	1,436	57.12%	788	31.34%	290	11.54%	0	0.00%	2,514
36	3,772	67.61%	1,522	27.28%	282	5.05%	3	0.05%	5,579
37	1,090	69.69%	385	24.62%	89	5.69%	0	0.00%	1,564
38	2,211	73.46%	608	20.20%	190	6.31%	1	0.03%	3,010
39	3,415	66.03%	894	17.29%	858	16.59%	5	0.10%	5,172
40	3,065	56.16%	2,144	39.28%	249	4.56%	0	0.00%	5,458
41	660	49.14%	370	27.55%	311	23.16%	2	0.15%	1,343
42	1,301	65.87%	540	27.34%	134	6.78%	0	0.00%	1,975
43	1,148	66.47%	491	28.43%	88	5.10%	0	0.00%	1,727
44	1,175	54.95%	884	41.35%	78	3.65%	1	0.05%	2,138
45	614	47.19%	307	23.60%	379	29.13%	1	0.08%	1,301
46	4,058	76.31%	1,076	20.23%	182	3.42%	2	0.04%	5,318
47	613	65.70%	286	30.65%	34	3.64%	0	0.00%	933
48	1,739	66.60%	709	27.15%	163	6.24%	0	0.00%	2,611
49	2,067	61.03%	1,184	34.96%	136	4.02%	0	0.00%	3,387
50	4,813	73.18%	1,602	24.36%	162	2.46%	0	0.00%	6,577
51	2,093	56.94%	1,467	39.91%	114	3.10%	2	0.05%	3,676
52	3,098	61.14%	1,761	34.75%	208	4.10%	0	0.00%	5,067
53	866	53.33%	439	27.03%	318	19.58%	1	0.06%	1,624
54	502	48.36%	253	24.37%	283	27.26%	0	0.00%	1,038
55	759	48.97%	339	21.87%	450	29.03%	2	0.13%	1,550
56	1,352	51.04%	523	19.74%	774	29.22%	0	0.00%	2,649
57	1,111	50.32%	443	20.06%	651	29.48%	3	0.14%	2,208
58	1,733	55.09%	499	15.86%	913	29.02%	1	0.03%	3,146
59	2,615	69.29%	1,025	27.16%	133	3.52%	1	0.03%	3,774
60	2,041	61.00%	1,176	35.15%	126	3.77%	3	0.09%	3,346
61	2,226	62.77%	1,166	32.88%	154	4.34%	0	0.00%	3,546
62	1,070	57.01%	565	30.10%	241	12.84%	1	0.05%	1,877
63	1,316	57.52%	317	13.85%	655	28.63%	0	0.00%	2,288
64	531	50.33%	224	21.23%	300	28.44%	0	0.00%	1,055
65	1,058	52.61%	382	19.00%	570	28.34%	1	0.05%	2,011
66	1,468	47.82%	621	20.23%	980	31.92%	1	0.03%	3,070

== Republican primary ==
=== Candidates ===
- Billy Ciancaglini, defense attorney

=== Results ===
Mayor of Philadelphia, Republican primary, 2019
Party	Candidate	Votes	%
Republican	Billy Ciancaglini	17,291	99.61
Write-in		68	0.39
Total votes		17,359	100.00

== General election ==
=== Results ===
Mayor of Philadelphia, general election, 2019
Party	Candidate	Votes	%
Democratic	Jim Kenney (incumbent)	234,749	80.33
Republican	Billy Ciancaglini	56,710	19.41
Write-in		780	0.27
Total votes		292,239	100.00
Democratic hold			

Results by Ward

Ward	Jim Kenney Democratic		Billy Ciancaglini Republican		Write-in		Total votes
Ward	#	%	#	%	#	%	Total votes
1	3,657	77.01%	1,075	22.64%	17	0.36%	4,749
2	6,433	85.82%	1,032	13.77%	31	0.41%	7,496
3	3,896	97.45%	100	2.50%	2	0.05%	3,998
4	3,633	97.30%	92	2.46%	9	0.24%	3,734
5	8,250	86.57%	1,226	12.86%	54	0.57%	9,530
6	2,542	96.73%	80	3.04%	6	0.23%	2,628
7	1,400	91.80%	123	8.07%	2	0.13%	1,525
8	8,596	85.85%	1,377	13.75%	40	0.40%	10,013
9	4,994	89.19%	592	10.57%	13	0.23%	5,599
10	5,859	97.80%	126	2.10%	6	0.10%	5,991
11	2,372	97.25%	65	2.67%	2	0.08%	2,439
12	4,166	95.99%	163	3.76%	11	0.25%	4,340
13	3,764	95.85%	149	3.79%	14	0.36%	3,927
14	1,676	94.90%	86	4.87%	4	0.23%	1,766
15	4,752	87.63%	651	12.00%	20	0.37%	5,423
16	1,781	96.74%	53	2.88%	7	0.38%	1,841
17	4,620	97.06%	135	2.84%	5	0.11%	4,760
18	3,370	83.23%	664	16.40%	15	0.37%	4,049
19	1,293	94.79%	69	5.06%	2	0.15%	1,364
20	1,433	95.66%	63	4.21%	2	0.13%	1,498
21	7,600	71.13%	3,061	28.65%	24	0.22%	10,685
22	7,237	95.99%	282	3.74%	20	0.27%	7,539
23	2,425	83.45%	471	16.21%	10	0.34%	2,906
24	2,419	95.69%	103	4.07%	6	0.24%	2,528
25	1,374	55.83%	1,071	43.52%	16	0.65%	2,461
26	1,743	39.70%	2,629	59.89%	18	0.41%	4,390
27	3,328	94.17%	196	5.55%	10	0.28%	3,534
28	2,001	97.85%	43	2.10%	1	0.05%	2,045
29	2,266	95.77%	93	3.93%	7	0.30%	2,366
30	4,285	90.59%	429	9.07%	16	0.34%	4,730
31	2,944	77.09%	859	22.49%	16	0.42%	3,819
32	3,099	96.15%	112	3.48%	12	0.37%	3,223
33	1,395	78.77%	373	21.06%	3	0.17%	1,771
34	7,854	94.44%	452	5.44%	10	0.12%	8,316
35	3,534	80.05%	876	19.84%	5	0.11%	4,415
36	6,279	91.52%	527	7.68%	55	0.80%	6,861
37	1,989	96.98%	59	2.88%	3	0.15%	2,051
38	3,685	90.65%	375	9.23%	5	0.12%	4,065
39	4,907	58.11%	3,505	41.51%	32	0.38%	8,444
40	6,740	92.70%	517	7.11%	14	0.19%	7,271
41	1,606	58.76%	1,123	41.09%	4	0.15%	2,733
42	2,504	90.66%	254	9.20%	4	0.14%	2,762
43	2,049	95.88%	88	4.12%	0	0.00%	2,137
44	2,401	97.17%	66	2.67%	4	0.16%	2,471
45	1,316	39.10%	2,030	60.31%	20	0.59%	3,366
46	5,598	96.52%	175	3.02%	27	0.47%	5,800
47	1,268	95.77%	51	3.85%	5	0.38%	1,324
48	3,023	86.17%	474	13.51%	11	0.31%	3,508
49	4,057	95.86%	172	4.06%	3	0.07%	4,232
50	7,508	97.03%	222	2.87%	8	0.10%	7,738
51	3,993	96.61%	133	3.22%	7	0.17%	4,133
52	5,767	95.02%	294	4.84%	8	0.13%	6,069
53	2,166	72.71%	801	26.89%	12	0.40%	2,979
54	1,346	77.58%	385	22.19%	4	0.23%	1,735
55	1,677	47.97%	1,808	51.72%	11	0.31%	3,496
56	3,104	54.56%	2,574	45.25%	11	0.19%	5,689
57	2,287	43.84%	2,922	56.01%	8	0.15%	5,217
58	3,583	43.11%	4,712	56.70%	16	0.19%	8,311
59	4,621	96.19%	177	3.68%	6	0.12%	4,804
60	3,659	97.29%	93	2.47%	9	0.24%	3,761
61	4,449	93.54%	301	6.33%	6	0.13%	4,756
62	2,348	76.48%	715	23.29%	7	0.23%	3,070
63	2,510	43.90%	3,192	55.83%	15	0.26%	5,717
64	1,031	39.37%	1,582	60.40%	6	0.23%	2,619
65	2,023	47.72%	2,205	52.02%	11	0.26%	4,239
66	3,264	34.42%	6,207	65.45%	12	0.13%	9,483
