= Tigre Hill =

American filmmaker

Tigre Hill is a filmmaker known for tackling controversial subjects. He is perhaps best known for his first documentary, The Shame of a City.

== Background ==
Tigre Hill was born in Pittsburgh and raised in the western Philadelphia neighborhood of Wynnefield. The son of a highly decorated Marine officer and a well-known educator, Hill attended Episcopal Academy in Merion and Archbishop Carroll High School (Radnor, Pennsylvania), then graduated with a speech and communications degree from Temple University.

== Casanova's Demise ==
While Hill’s first feature narrative film, Casanova’s Demise, has yet to be released because of various legal issues, its controversial subject matter (the film concerns a man sentenced to castration for committing rape), and its inclusion of local and national celebrities including R&B singer Adina Howard, attracted significant media attention and brought Hill to public notice.

== The Shame of a City ==
The Shame of a City, a feature-length documentary that catapulted Hill into the local and national political spotlight, has been identified as a tool used by reform candidate Michael Nutter in securing election to Philadelphia mayoral office in 2007. The film, independently released in 2006, followed moderate Republican mayoral candidate Sam Katz as he unsuccessfully sought to defeat incumbent Democrat John Street in 2003 in a race that made national news when a Federal Bureau of Investigation bug was found in Street’s office. Hill’s film gained widespread attention for exposing many high-ranking Street supporters as disingenuous opportunists who intentionally and falsely manipulated racial tensions and suspicion of President George W. Bush's administration to get Street re-elected despite a string of corruption indictments in his inner circle that threatened to implicate him directly

The Shame of a City quickly became a mechanism favored by local politicians, journalists, academics and activists to address the endemic problems of a city once referred to as “corrupt and contented.” The timing of these civic discussions benefited reformer and former city council member Nutter, who was by then attempting to succeed Street by securing the Democratic primary vote for mayor against two Street supporters portrayed negatively in Hill’s movie: Congressmen Bob Brady and Chaka Fattah. After receiving Hill’s endorsement, Nutter himself screened “The Shame of a City” five times to sold-out audiences, using it to raise money and awareness of his opponents’ political techniques. In the primary election of May 2007, Nutter overcame a polling lag to emerge as winner, and easily beat his opponent in the general election.

The film generated substantial press coverage, earning Hill an interview on MSNBC, named references in five successive issues of Philadelphia Magazine, and positive reviews by The Philadelphia Inquirer, among others. Screenings were sponsored by institutions including Philadelphia magazine. The film, beyond solidifying Hill’s reputation as a serious filmmaker who could maintain the respect of even the people vilified in his film, provided an introduction to a Katz campaign consultant, Carl Singley, whose strongly positive appearance in the movie briefly made him the focus of an early, informal citywide campaign for him to run for mayor. Philadelphia magazine picked up on the campaign, but Singley eventually declined to run.

== The Barrel of a Gun ==
In late 2006, Hill commenced work on a documentary concerning another Philadelphia controversy: the murder in 1981 of white Philadelphia police officer Daniel Faulkner and the conviction of black journalist-turned-cab-driver Mumia Abu-Jamal. The case had ignited worldwide controversy, with Abu-Jamal’s arrest and trial becoming a cause célèbre for celebrities, foreign dignitaries and human rights campaigners. Faulkner supporters, however, regarded the controversy as an effort to obscure the truth about Faulkner's death.

The resulting film, The Barrel of a Gun, diverged from earlier documentaries In Prison My Whole Life and A Case for Reasonable Doubt to present the facts of the crime as testified to at trial and the historical events that led up to and may have caused it. It included on-camera interviews with parties to the controversy including widow Maureen Faulkner; Pennsylvania governor Ed Rendell; prosecutor Joe McGill; Philadelphia district attorney Lynne Abraham; Abu-Jamal attorney Robert Bryan; celebrities Ed Asner, Mike Farrell, Danny Glover and Sister Helen Prejean; former Philadelphia police commissioner Sylvester Johnson; Pam Africa, head of the International Concerned Friends and Family of Mumia Abu-Jamal and close ally of MOVE founder John Africa; author David Horowitz and radio talk show host Michael Smerconish. Investigative journalist Gerald Posner advised on the movie's production.

The film's release was scheduled for late 2009, but Hill announced in November 2009 that it would be delayed to incorporate a "rare new insight" achieved while the movie was in production. In June 2010 it was announced on Facebook that the film's premiere screening would take place in September 2010. The ticket price will be $46.99, representing Officer Faulkner's badge number.

Congressman Mike Fitzpatrick (PA-8) distributed copies of the film to Senate offices in Washington, D.C., in February 2014 as part of his efforts to oppose Debo Adegbile’s nomination to serve as the Assistant Attorney General for the Civil Rights Division of the United States Department of Justice. Adegbile had contributed to the filing of a 2009 appeal on behalf of Abu-Jamal; ultimately, Adegbile’s appointment was rejected by the Senate.

Hill also directed a music video for a song that was included in the film that was written by Extreme, and former Van Halen, frontman Gary Cherone titled "The Murder Of Daniel Faulkner". Cherone wrote the song several years ago out of sympathy for the slain Philadelphia police officer's widow, Maureen. It was shot at the location in Philadelphia, 13th and Locust, where Faulkner was murdered. It is available on YouTube.

== Current projects ==
Hill is currently developing The Corrupt and the Dead, a documentary about the American mafia. Filmed in collaboration with journalist and author George Anastasia (Blood and Honor, The Last Gangster) and Philadelphia FOX 29 investigative reporter Dave Schratwieser, the film focuses on the economic impact of the mob.

Hill was working with journalist Larry Kane on a documentary about Kane’s time as the only journalist to travel with the Beatles for the entirety of their North American tours in 1964 and 1965 when Ron Howard announced in July 2014 that he would be doing a documentary about the Beatles’ performing history. Howard's documentary, called The Beatles: Eight Days a Week, would be presented in collaboration with Apple, the Beatles’ company; White Horse Pictures; and Imagine Entertainment. Kane and Hill agreed that Howard's documentary would be a better opportunity for Kane so they ceased production on their documentary. Hill received a consultant credit on Howard's film since it used some of his footage of Kane.

Hill also announced that he is working on a feature film script for a biopic chronicling the life of Philadelphia civil rights activist Cecil B. Moore, who was the head of Philadelphia’s NAACP and successfully led the fight for Girard College’s integration

In December 2020 PhillyMag.com reported that Hill was close to completing a new documentary film titled "72 Seconds In Rittenhouse Square". The documentary is about the controversial 2018 stabbing death of a white, wealthy real estate developer by a young African American Uber Eats delivery person. Michael White claimed that he stabbed Sean Schellenger in self-defense. White was put on trial where he was eventually acquitted of manslaughter. Hill will be detailing the case, the trial, and the aftermath of White's acquittal. He will also be exploring the racial and class dynamics that made this case so controversial. This documentary was released on Paramount Plus in 2023.
