= 2011 Philadelphia mayoral election =

- November 8, 2011
- Turnout: 20% ▼9 pp
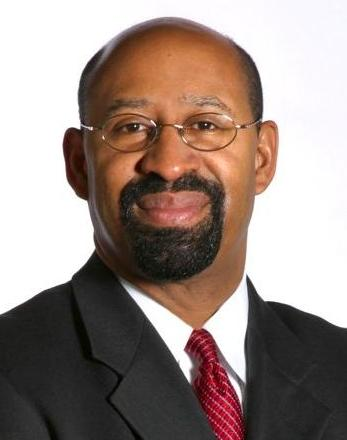

Nominee	Michael Nutter	Karen Brown
Party	Democratic	Republican
Popular vote	136,532	39,597
Percentage	74.73%	21.67%
- Nutter: 40–50% 50–60% 60–70% 70–80% 80–90% >90% Brown: 40–50% 50–60% 60–70% 70–80% Tie: 40–50%
Mayor before election
Michael Nutter
Democratic
Elected mayor
Michael Nutter
Democratic

The 2011 Philadelphia mayoral election was held on November 8, 2011, to elect the mayor of Philadelphia, Pennsylvania. Incumbent Michael Nutter had been Mayor of Philadelphia since 2008 after being elected in the 2007 election, and was re-elected with approximately 75% of the vote. Primary elections were held on May 17, 2011.

== Democratic primary ==
On December 22, 2010, Democratic Mayor Michael Nutter officially announced that he would seek re-election. With the backing of health unions and the Black Clergy, Nutter was favored by a wide margin to win re-election. His only challenger in the primaries was Milton Street, brother of former Mayor John F. Street, who announced his bid on February 17, 2011. Having spent time in federal prison for tax evasion, he described his plans to work toward finding jobs for convicts after their release. John Street told The Philadelphia Inquirer that Nutter was "not a black mayor ... just a mayor with dark skin." Nutter said those comments were ignorant and said "I don't think anyone ever asked Ed Rendell was he white enough." Nutter had been criticized for "stop and frisk" policies and service cuts.

=== Candidates ===
==== Declared ====
- Michael Nutter, incumbent Mayor of Philadelphia
- Milton Street, former Pennsylvania State Senator

=== Results ===
Democratic primary results by ward Nutter: 50%–60%; 60%–70%; 70%–80%; 80%–90%; 90%–100%

Democratic primary results
Party	Candidate	Votes	%
Democratic	Michael Nutter (incumbent)	113,484	75.90
Democratic	Milton Street	36,030	24.10
Total votes		149,514	100.00

Results by ward

Ward	Nutter		Street		Total votes
Ward	#	%	#	%	Total votes
1	1,616	85.32%	278	14.68%	1,894
2	3,000	88.76%	380	11.24%	3,380
3	1,687	68.00%	794	32.00%	2,481
4	1,578	66.81%	784	33.19%	2,362
5	3,462	93.27%	250	6.73%	3,712
6	835	59.77%	562	40.23%	1,397
7	567	73.16%	208	26.84%	775
8	3,892	94.21%	239	5.79%	4,131
9	3,148	92.43%	258	7.57%	3,406
10	2,711	71.02%	1,106	28.98%	3,817
11	838	54.84%	690	45.16%	1,528
12	2,016	67.74%	960	32.26%	2,976
13	1,606	60.79%	1,036	39.21%	2,642
14	543	59.74%	366	40.26%	909
15	2,313	89.48%	272	10.52%	2,585
16	752	53.41%	656	46.59%	1,408
17	2,270	69.19%	1,011	30.81%	3,281
18	1,042	82.37%	223	17.63%	1,265
19	509	65.68%	266	34.32%	775
20	511	65.18%	273	34.82%	784
21	3,834	87.55%	545	12.45%	4,379
22	3,949	81.93%	871	18.07%	4,820
23	1,128	69.08%	505	30.92%	1,633
24	813	66.48%	410	33.52%	1,223
25	834	78.53%	228	21.47%	1,062
26	1,950	90.45%	206	9.55%	2,156
27	767	78.35%	212	21.65%	979
28	789	52.88%	703	47.12%	1,492
29	827	60.81%	533	39.19%	1,360
30	1,825	84.57%	333	15.43%	2,158
31	977	88.58%	126	11.42%	1,103
32	1,060	52.58%	956	47.42%	2,016
33	663	67.93%	313	32.07%	976
34	3,198	68.95%	1,440	31.05%	4,638
35	1,346	73.07%	496	26.93%	1,842
36	2,111	61.38%	1,328	38.62%	3,439
37	753	56.83%	572	43.17%	1,325
38	1,725	74.77%	582	25.23%	2,307
39	3,757	86.09%	607	13.91%	4,364
40	2,578	66.51%	1,298	33.49%	3,876
41	1,423	83.17%	288	16.83%	1,711
42	1,030	65.19%	550	34.81%	1,580
43	894	59.21%	616	40.79%	1,510
44	908	65.04%	488	34.96%	1,396
45	1,155	83.39%	230	16.61%	1,385
46	2,061	77.71%	591	22.29%	2,652
47	354	55.40%	285	44.60%	639
48	1,094	64.81%	594	35.19%	1,688
49	1,613	64.16%	901	35.84%	2,514
50	3,776	75.11%	1,251	24.89%	5,027
51	1,556	65.88%	806	34.12%	2,362
52	3,054	77.69%	877	22.31%	3,931
53	1,080	80.18%	267	19.82%	1,347
54	843	80.59%	203	19.41%	1,046
55	1,899	86.79%	289	13.21%	2,188
56	2,545	88.06%	345	11.94%	2,890
57	1,809	86.43%	284	13.57%	2,093
58	2,500	86.42%	393	13.58%	2,893
59	2,283	71.88%	893	28.12%	3,176
60	1,410	66.67%	705	33.33%	2,115
61	1,698	66.82%	843	33.18%	2,541
62	1,357	75.89%	431	24.11%	1,788
63	1,715	88.27%	228	11.73%	1,943
64	1,152	87.01%	172	12.99%	1,324
65	2,016	87.35%	292	12.65%	2,308
66	2,479	88.19%	332	11.81%	2,811

== Republican primary ==
The Republican primary election saw two candidate vying for office. Real estate agent John Featherman (not to be confused with John Fetterman) filed in June 2010 to become eligible for the election so that he could fight against increasing taxes and to create a more "business-friendly climate" in the city. In March 2011, former Democrat Karen Brown announced her bid to run as a Republican in the upcoming mayoral election. Though she had numerous ties to the city Democratic party, she won the backing of the city Republican party at an event in late March. Brown went on to become a schoolteacher at Resurrection Catholic School.

=== Candidates ===
==== Declared ====
- Karen Brown, former teacher and Democratic ward committeewoman
- John Featherman, real estate agent

=== Results ===
Republican primary results by ward Brown: 50%–60%; 60%–70%; 70%–80%; Featherman: 50%–60%; 60%–70%; 70%–80%; Tie: Tie

Republican primary results
Party	Candidate	Votes	%
Republican	Karen Brown	8,369	50.19
Republican	John Featherman	8,305	49.81
Total votes		16,674	100.00

Results by ward

Ward	Brown		Featherman		Total votes
Ward	#	%	#	%	Total votes
1	130	72.22%	50	27.78%	180
2	90	32.26%	189	67.74%	279
3	14	50.00%	14	50.00%	28
4	17	60.71%	11	39.29%	28
5	88	22.80%	298	77.20%	386
6	10	52.63%	9	47.37%	19
7	23	36.51%	40	63.49%	63
8	114	28.64%	284	71.36%	398
9	74	27.51%	195	72.49%	269
10	10	43.48%	13	56.52%	23
11	33	60.00%	22	40.00%	55
12	16	43.24%	21	56.76%	37
13	15	39.47%	23	60.53%	38
14	8	25.81%	23	74.19%	31
15	69	36.13%	122	63.87%	191
16	3	23.08%	10	76.92%	13
17	14	38.89%	22	61.11%	36
18	114	64.77%	62	35.23%	176
19	6	37.50%	10	62.50%	16
20	9	60.00%	6	40.00%	15
21	314	37.70%	519	62.30%	833
22	37	39.78%	56	60.22%	93
23	112	53.08%	99	46.92%	211
24	23	57.50%	17	42.50%	40
25	347	71.84%	136	28.16%	483
26	385	69.87%	166	30.13%	551
27	17	22.67%	58	77.33%	75
28	4	44.44%	5	55.56%	9
29	9	30.00%	21	70.00%	30
30	28	24.78%	85	75.22%	113
31	217	65.36%	115	34.64%	332
32	17	58.62%	12	41.38%	29
33	53	42.40%	72	57.60%	125
34	28	29.79%	66	70.21%	94
35	188	48.70%	198	51.30%	386
36	61	64.21%	34	35.79%	95
37	11	47.83%	12	52.17%	23
38	28	29.17%	68	70.83%	96
39	268	59.96%	179	40.04%	447
40	53	40.15%	79	59.85%	132
41	190	53.07%	168	46.93%	358
42	53	53.54%	46	46.46%	99
43	17	48.57%	18	51.43%	35
44	25	65.79%	13	34.21%	38
45	439	69.13%	196	30.87%	635
46	25	39.68%	38	60.32%	63
47	9	60.00%	6	40.00%	15
48	59	44.70%	73	55.30%	132
49	15	44.12%	19	55.88%	34
50	18	58.06%	13	41.94%	31
51	30	66.67%	15	33.33%	45
52	42	40.78%	61	59.22%	103
53	122	41.08%	175	58.92%	297
54	36	43.90%	46	56.10%	82
55	435	54.51%	363	45.49%	798
56	342	49.07%	355	50.93%	697
57	383	45.92%	451	54.08%	834
58	592	48.09%	639	51.91%	1,231
59	17	31.48%	37	68.52%	54
60	19	67.86%	9	32.14%	28
61	47	42.73%	63	57.27%	110
62	100	43.86%	128	56.14%	228
63	638	55.14%	519	44.86%	1,157
64	351	50.80%	340	49.20%	691
65	233	44.81%	287	55.19%	520
66	1,075	57.15%	806	42.85%	1,881

== General election ==
=== Polling ===
The general election was held on November 8, 2011. With all but one precinct reporting, Nutter received 74.69% of the vote.

Nutter's approval rating in February 2011 was 50%, and in March 2011 was 52%.

A hypothetical matchup poll conducted by the Garin-Hart-Yang Research Group between Nutter and Brown showed Nutter leading with 74%.

=== Results ===
Philadelphia mayoral election, 2011
Party	Candidate	Votes	%	±%
Democratic	Michael Nutter (incumbent)	136,532	74.73	−8.6
Republican	Karen Brown	39,597	21.67	+4.4
Independent	Wali Rahman	6,580	3.60	N/A
Turnout		182,709		
Democratic hold		Swing		

Results by ward

Ward	Michael Nutter Democratic		Karen Brown Republican		Wali Rahman Independent		Total votes
Ward	#	%	#	%	#	%	Total votes
1	1,666	68.79%	711	29.36%	45	1.86%	2,422
2	2,667	79.71%	592	17.69%	87	2.60%	3,346
3	2,464	85.47%	293	10.16%	126	4.37%	2,883
4	2,104	83.79%	261	10.39%	146	5.81%	2,511
5	3,887	84.83%	597	13.03%	98	2.14%	4,582
6	1,375	80.69%	192	11.27%	137	8.04%	1,704
7	713	81.67%	146	16.72%	14	1.60%	873
8	4,405	85.07%	674	13.02%	99	1.91%	5,178
9	3,087	86.08%	400	11.15%	99	2.76%	3,586
10	3,665	86.93%	345	8.18%	206	4.89%	4,216
11	1,462	83.93%	187	10.73%	93	5.34%	1,742
12	2,313	82.93%	285	10.22%	191	6.85%	2,789
13	2,167	83.00%	271	10.38%	173	6.63%	2,611
14	804	84.81%	100	10.55%	44	4.64%	948
15	2,553	84.90%	383	12.74%	71	2.36%	3,007
16	1,162	81.95%	163	11.50%	93	6.56%	1,418
17	2,856	84.37%	352	10.40%	177	5.23%	3,385
18	1,017	69.00%	424	28.77%	33	2.24%	1,474
19	770	89.12%	76	8.80%	18	2.08%	864
20	700	84.95%	81	9.83%	43	5.22%	824
21	4,271	70.29%	1,693	27.86%	112	1.84%	6,076
22	4,124	87.48%	387	8.21%	203	4.31%	4,714
23	1,410	73.78%	440	23.02%	61	3.19%	1,911
24	1,140	80.91%	187	13.27%	82	5.82%	1,409
25	735	52.39%	642	45.76%	26	1.85%	1,403
26	1,362	51.63%	1,259	47.73%	17	0.64%	2,638
27	1,101	80.90%	167	12.27%	93	6.83%	1,361
28	1,238	84.05%	145	9.84%	90	6.11%	1,473
29	1,255	84.12%	172	11.53%	65	4.36%	1,492
30	1,964	85.91%	233	10.19%	89	3.89%	2,286
31	987	60.59%	597	36.65%	45	2.76%	1,629
32	1,753	80.34%	263	12.05%	166	7.61%	2,182
33	623	64.36%	320	33.06%	25	2.58%	968
34	4,181	80.37%	722	13.88%	299	5.75%	5,202
35	1,781	67.98%	765	29.20%	74	2.82%	2,620
36	2,762	78.53%	540	15.35%	215	6.11%	3,517
37	1,126	83.78%	139	10.34%	79	5.88%	1,344
38	2,237	84.00%	337	12.65%	89	3.34%	2,663
39	3,150	60.50%	1,996	38.33%	61	1.17%	5,207
40	3,413	81.18%	601	14.30%	190	4.52%	4,204
41	1,400	62.36%	801	35.68%	44	1.96%	2,245
42	1,318	78.92%	291	17.43%	61	3.65%	1,670
43	1,193	83.48%	154	10.78%	82	5.74%	1,429
44	1,356	83.76%	157	9.70%	106	6.55%	1,619
45	1,064	50.02%	1,029	48.38%	34	1.60%	2,127
46	2,578	83.13%	278	8.96%	245	7.90%	3,101
47	550	81.00%	82	12.08%	47	6.92%	679
48	1,356	71.82%	461	24.42%	71	3.76%	1,888
49	2,390	83.62%	303	10.60%	165	5.77%	2,858
50	4,718	86.94%	472	8.70%	237	4.37%	5,427
51	2,290	83.24%	287	10.43%	174	6.32%	2,751
52	3,972	86.31%	432	9.39%	198	4.30%	4,602
53	1,310	66.26%	621	31.41%	46	2.33%	1,977
54	840	69.59%	332	27.51%	35	2.90%	1,207
55	1,823	56.06%	1,387	42.65%	42	1.29%	3,252
56	2,861	63.56%	1,585	35.21%	55	1.22%	4,501
57	2,058	55.31%	1,613	43.35%	50	1.34%	3,721
58	3,447	57.10%	2,523	41.79%	67	1.11%	6,037
59	2,556	83.86%	281	9.22%	211	6.92%	3,048
60	2,066	84.85%	220	9.03%	149	6.12%	2,435
61	2,309	80.40%	397	13.82%	166	5.78%	2,872
62	1,370	69.02%	568	28.61%	47	2.37%	1,985
63	2,525	57.74%	1,806	41.30%	42	0.96%	4,373
64	1,236	52.24%	1,101	46.53%	29	1.23%	2,366
65	2,027	61.74%	1,214	36.98%	42	1.28%	3,283
66	3,469	52.61%	3,064	46.47%	61	0.93%	6,594

Preceded by 2007	Philadelphia mayoral election 2011	Succeeded by 2015
