= The Shame of a City =

2006 film

The Shame of a City is a 2006 feature-length documentary directed by Tigre Hill about the final month of the 2003 Philadelphia Mayoral Election. During that election, incumbent Democrat John Street sought to defeat his Republican challenger Sam Katz. Philadelphia is predominantly Democratic, but early polls showed Katz with a small lead. Twenty-seven days prior to the election, the FBI revealed that it was investigating Street for corruption, but polls showed that the public supported Street more after the scandal broke. Hill attempts to investigate how Street turned the corruption scandal into an advantage.

The film is named after Lincoln Steffens’s 1904 book The Shame of the Cities, which sought to expose the wrongdoing of public officials in cities across the United States.

== Plot summary ==
Twenty-seven days before the election, an FBI bug was found in the mayor’s office. When asked about the bug, the FBI admitted that Street was under investigation. The discovery at first seemed like a death knell to the Street campaign and a near certain victory for Katz; however, Street and his supporters argued that the FBI investigation was an instance of institutional racial prejudice, polarizing the campaign. Moreover, Street successfully reoriented the campaign away from local issues and towards a referendum on the locally unpopular, Republican-controlled federal government. As a result, Street won re-election by a sixteen-point margin even as his closest supporters were indicted.

== Media attention ==
The film won “Best Feature-Length Film” at the 2006 Philadelphia Film Festival's Festival of Independents and was reviewed positively by the Philadelphia Inquirer.

Shame of a City would be shown at—among other places—the National Constitution Center, and be referenced by name in five successive issues of Philadelphia magazine.

Hill was interviewed on Imus in the Morning about the documentary.

=== Selected quotes ===
Tigre Hill’s The Shame of a City is a civic Rorschach test. A cautionary tale of the streetfight that was the 2003 Philadelphia mayoral contest, this scrappy exposé reveals how Smear-Room politics alienates voters across the political and color spectrum.

— Carrie Rickey, “A Backroom Look at Katz vs. Street,” The Philadelphia Inquirer, March 31, 2006

The Shame of a City is sure to be studied in political-campaign war rooms for years to come.

— Stu Bykofsky, “Politics in ‘Shame,’ No Shame in Politics,” Philadelphia Daily News, March 30, 2006

The Shame of a City is political dynamite. Thumbs up. Four stars. Must-see.

— Michael Smerconish, “Sneak Peek at a True Philly Horror Film,” Philadelphia Daily News, March 23, 2006

== Political impact ==
The timing of the documentary's initial release benefited reform-minded city council member Michael Nutter, who was attempting to succeed Street as the Democratic nominee for mayor. Nutter's primary opponents were Congressmen Bob Brady and Chaka Fattah, two Street supporters portrayed negatively in Hill’s movie. After receiving Hill’s endorsement, Nutter himself screened The Shame of a City five times to sold-out audiences, using it to raise money and awareness. The DVD release was also timed to coincide with the primary election cycle, reminding voters of the previous elections' controversies. Although he began as underdog, Nutter would eventually win the May 2007 (Democratic) primary and then defeat his (Republican) opponent in the general election.

The Shame of a City also provided an introduction to a Katz campaign consultant, Carl Singley, whose strongly positive appearance in the movie briefly made him the focus of an early, informal city-wide campaign for him to run for mayor. Singley declined to run.
