= Jim Kenney =

Mayor of Philadelphia from 2016 to 2024

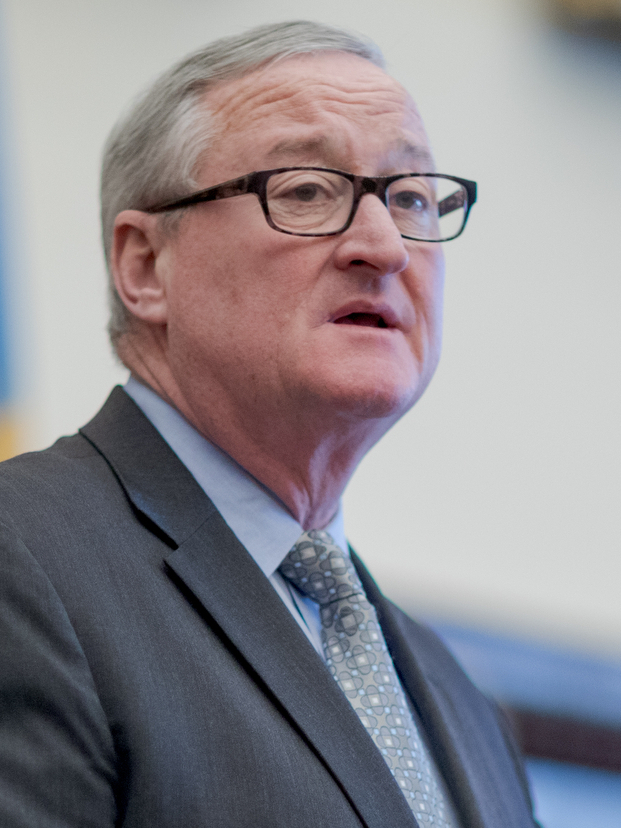

99th Mayor of Philadelphia
- In office January 4, 2016 – January 1, 2024
- Preceded by: Michael Nutter
- Succeeded by: Cherelle Parker

Member of the Philadelphia City Council from the at-large district
- In office January 6, 1992 – January 29, 2015
- Preceded by: George Burrell

Personal details
- Born: James Francis Kenney; August 7, 1958 (age 68) Philadelphia, Pennsylvania, U.S.
- Party: Democratic
- Education: La Salle University (BA)

James Francis Kenney (born August 7, 1958) is an American politician who served as the 99th mayor of Philadelphia from 2016 to 2024. Kenney was first elected on November 3, 2015, defeating his Republican rival Melissa Murray Bailey after winning the crowded Democratic primary contest by a landslide on May 19.

Before he became mayor, Kenney was a member of the Philadelphia City Council for 23 years, serving as a Councilman at Large from January 1992 until January 29, 2015, when he resigned to run for mayor.

Kenney was re-elected to a second term as mayor on November 5, 2019.

== Early life ==
Jim Kenney was born on August 7, 1958, in the Whitman neighborhood of South Philadelphia. His father was a firefighter and his mother was a homemaker. His parents both worked second jobs to put Jim and his four siblings through private Catholic schools. In high school, Kenney was a newspaper deliveryman and busboy. Kenney graduated from Saint Joseph's Preparatory School in 1976 and in 1980 received a political science bachelor's degree from La Salle University. He was the first in his family to graduate from college.

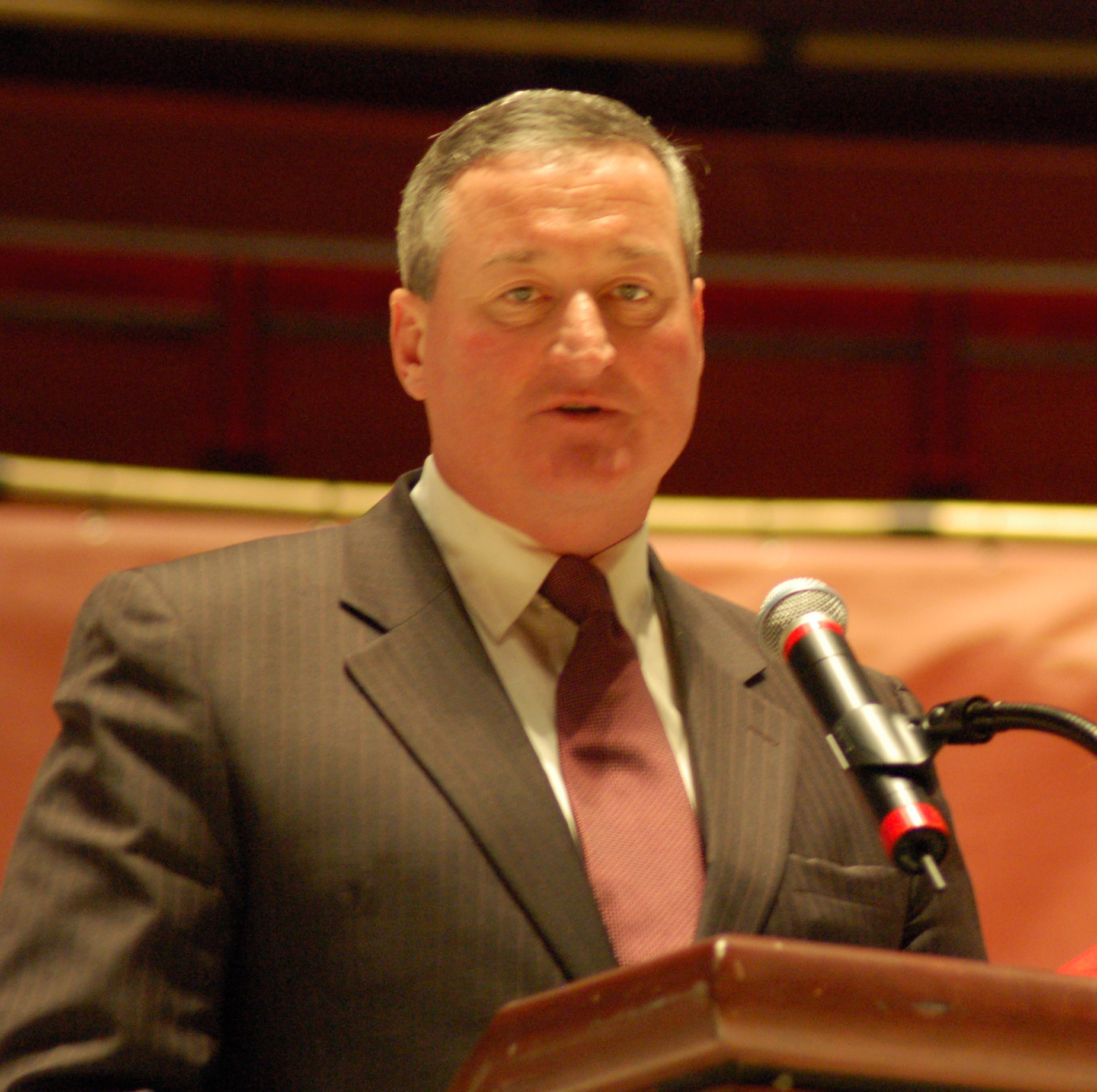
City Councilman Jim Kenney in 2009

== Philadelphia City Council ==
Kenney was elected to his first term in 1991 at the age of 32 years old. During his time on Philadelphia's City Council, Kenney served as Chairman of the Council Committee on Labor and Civil Service. He was also Vice-Chairman of the Committee on Rules, Committee on the Environment, and Committee on Law and Government, and was a member of the Committee on Public Safety, Technology and Information Services, Public Property and Public Works, Fiscal Stability and Intergovernmental Cooperation, Public Health and Human Services, and the Legislative Oversight Committee.

In 2010, Kenney sided with the local firefighters' union when Mayor Michael Nutter took action to remove the collective bargaining rights of paramedics.

In 2014, Kenney successfully introduced legislation that ended arrests for possession of small amounts of marijuana. The bill replaced incarceration with the requirement to pay a fine. In advocating for the bill, Kenney had cited the disproportionate effect of arrests for small amounts of marijuana on African Americans. Philadelphia became the largest city in the country to decriminalize marijuana.

This success came only one year after Kenney entered office. After this passage of the bill, in 2015 arrests for marijuana possession were down more than 70 percent from 2014. Reducing the small amount of marijuana to a summary offense resulted in the approximately 1,000 people being arrested for pot possession compared to the typical 3,000 people per year prior to the decriminalization. Kenney himself does not approve of marijuana use, in fact her ardently opposes it. However, the effects of high criminalization of marijuana and high arrests rates resulted in compounded problems associated with preventing people from keeping jobs and getting aid (financial and educational due to the stipulations).

City Councilman is quoted saying, "you should go through some penalty; its nice to have you stop your behavior, but being arrested to me is still a little bit over the top." With his introduction of this specific legislation, those who possess small amounts of the drug will be sent to the District Attorney's Small Amounts of Marijuana program which has a 3-hour drug abuse class and a $300 fine to deter the behavior. Instead of serving jail time, this diversionary program acts as education and proper - and an appropriate level of - reprimanding. Attention to this issue was promoted by the discriminatory practices associated with marijuana arrest. It was disproportionately impacting African Americans, not because they were the only ones using the drug, but because they were the ones getting caught. 82 percent of the 4,200 offenders were African America. It was also impacting a plethora of black youths. Of the 4,200 arrests made for small amounts, 563 were juveniles who would subsequently have to serve jail time, derailing them from school and their adolescence. So, Kenney targeted this marginalization through policy implementation. Furthermore, Kenney believed it was a waste of money and time. Arresting people with small amounts of marijuana resulted in about $3 million a year in arrest cost for the city of Philadelphia and used about 17,000 hours of policing which could be utilize in more effective areas.

Kenney garnered criticism from local and national economic commentators when he proposed bonus pension payments, distributing funds when pension plans exceed target returns in any given year even though solvency depends on retaining above-average earnings to prepare for years with below-average earnings.

While on the Philadelphia City Council, Kenney worked as a consultant at Vitetta Architects and Engineers, served on the Independence Blue Cross board, and was an adjunct professor at the University of Pennsylvania. He gave up these positions when he was elected mayor in 2015.

== Mayor of Philadelphia ==
=== Elections ===
Incumbent Democratic Mayor Michael Nutter could not run for re-election to a third consecutive term due to the home-rule charter's two-term limit. Registered Democrats hold a formidable 7-to-1 ratio over registered Republicans in Philadelphia, giving Democratic candidates a distinct advantage in citywide elections. The mayoral primary elections were held on May 19, 2015. Kenney won the primary in a landslide with 55.83% of the vote, defeating a crowded field of five other Democratic candidates, including Anthony H. Williams and former District Attorney Lynne Abraham. Republican Melissa Murray Bailey, a business executive, ran unopposed for the Republican nomination. Kenney won with 85.1% of the vote. Kenney was inaugurated as the 99th Mayor of Philadelphia on January 4, 2016.

Kenney was reelected as mayor in 2019. The Democratic primary was held on May 21, 2019, and he defeated former City Controller Alan Butkovitz and Pennsylvania State Senator Anthony Hardy Williams with 67% of the vote. On November 5, 2019, Kenney won re-election by defeating Billy Ciancaglini, a Philadelphia defense attorney and fellow La Salle grad, in the general election with more than 80% of the vote.

=== First term (2016–2020) ===
==== Sugary drinks tax ====
Kenney proposed a citywide soda tax that would raise the price of soda at three cents per ounce, originally with the intent to raise money for universal pre-k. At the time, it was the biggest soda tax proposal in the United States. Kenney promoted using tax revenue to fund universal pre-K, jobs, and development projects, which he expected would raise $400 million over five years, all the while reducing sugar intake by decreasing the demand for sugary beverages. Kenney's soda tax proposal was brought to the national spotlight and divided key members of the Democratic Party. The idea of a soda tax quickly became a national issue. Candidates in the 2016 United States presidential election gave their take. Senator Bernie Sanders said that the tax would hurt the poor. Hillary Clinton, on the other hand, said that she was "very supportive" of the idea. The lobbying organization American Beverage Association took a stand against Kenney's proposal. The trade organization, funded by soda companies and distributors, ran local television, radio, and newspaper advertisements against the idea, claiming that the tax would disproportionately hurt the poor. The American Heart Association, on the other hand, has supported Kenney's efforts. On June 16, 2016, the soda tax passed with a 13–4 vote from City Council. The initial proposal of three cents per ounce was lowered to 1.5 cents per ounce. The tax was implemented at the start of the 2017 calendar year.

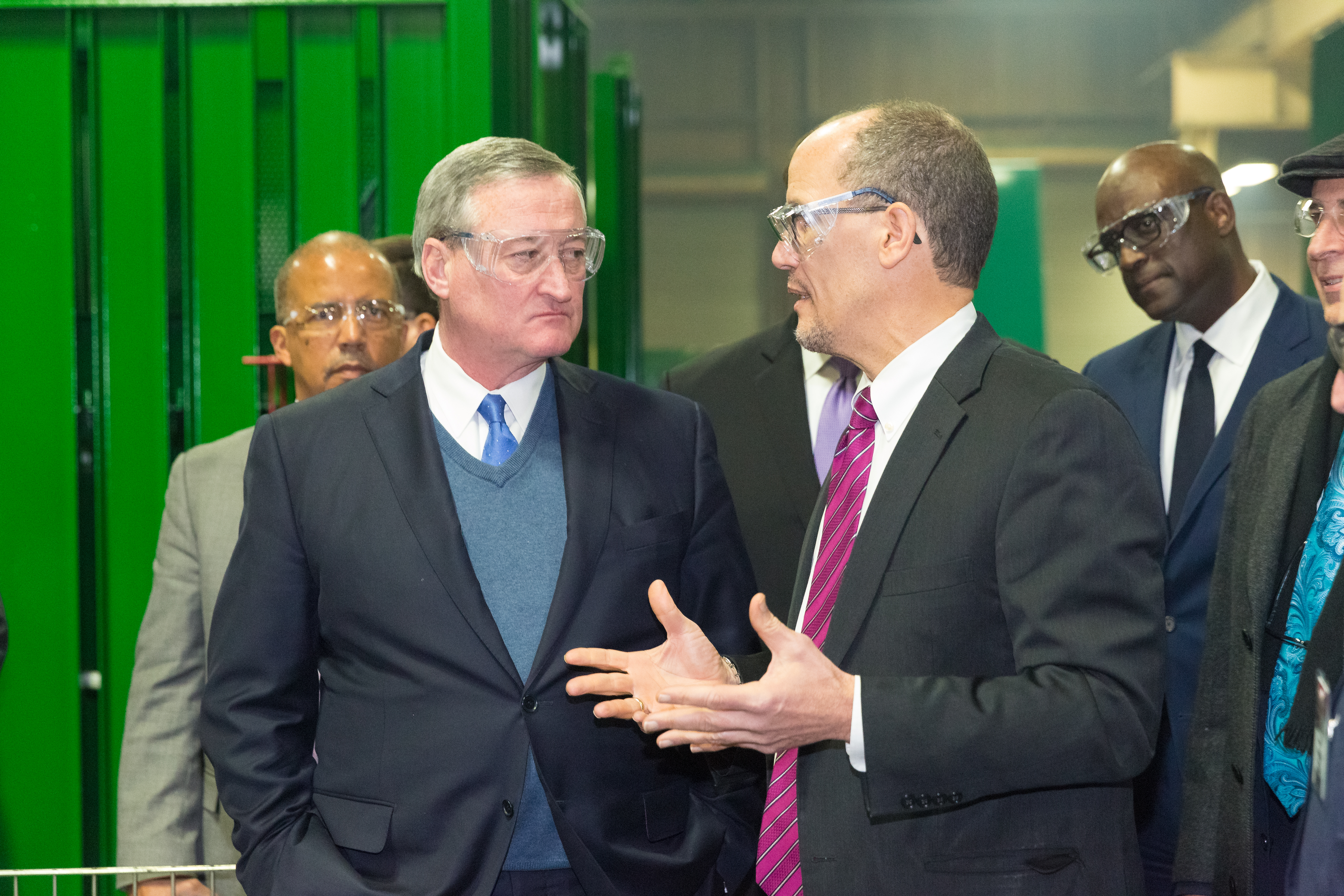
Jim Kenney (left) with then Secretary of Labor Tom Perez (right) in a Philadelphia factory

After the tax took effect, Kenney said retailers' price gouging blamed on the tax and charging the tax on items not subject to it was "wrong" and "misleading". In February 2017, soda manufacturers and retailers announced sales declines of 30–50% in Philadelphia and announced layoffs for March. The city called the predicted layoffs "fear-mongering". While the tax was projected to raise about $2.7 million in its first month, far below the estimate of $7.6 million per month, the city expected that figure to rise.

In March 2017, Pepsi announced plans to lay off between 80 and 100 employees, and blamed this on the tax. The city stated the program had created 251 jobs, mostly full-time pre-K teaching positions and said the soda industry was "holding hostage" the jobs of hard-working people in their battle to overturn the tax. Pepsi reported nearly $35 billion in gross income and $6 billion in profit last year.... The idea that they can afford to do that but 'must lay off workers' should make every Philadelphian very skeptical of whether these layoffs are actually due to the tax." The layoffs would occur at plants in Philadelphia and Wilmington which are run as independent businesses.

In May 2019, the University of Pennsylvania released a study describing the aftermath of the soda tax, two years later. Total volume sales of taxed beverages in Philadelphia decreased by 1.3 billion ounces (from 2.475 billion to 1.214 billion) or by 51.0% after tax implementation. Volume sales in the Pennsylvania border zip codes, however, increased by 308.2 million ounces (from 713.1 million to 1.021 billion), offsetting 24.4% of the decrease in Philadelphia's sales volume.

The sugary drinks tax became an issue in the 2019 mayoral election, with the American Beverage Association spending $521,196 to run advertisements opposing Kenney's reelection.

==== Local control ====
In October 2017, Mayor Kenney announced that the city was taking back control of its public schools after sixteen years of state control. In an address to City Council, Kenney outlined the end of the state-dominated School Reform Commission (SRC) and a path to local control of the Philadelphia School District by July 1, 2018. In 2018, the SRC was dissolved and replaced with a nine member locally appointed Board of Education, which reported directly to the Mayor's Office.

In 2016, Mayor Kenney expanded the city's PHLpreK program, which provided over 17,000 children with a Pre-K education by the time Kenney left office in 2023. The Community Schools Program provides behavioral health care, emergency assistance funds, and food access to schools under the School District of Philadelphia, all paid for with Beverage Tax revenue. Community Schools has 20 participating schools and has served over 10,000 children. Out-of-School Time (OST) provides enriched learning experiences to children, such as summer camps and workforce opportunities. OST serves roughly 6,000 kids each summer and 7,000 each school year across 136 different programs.

In 2020, Mayor Kenney created the Office of Children and Families (OCF) to coordinate the Department of Human Services (DHS), PHLpreK, Community Schools, and Out-of-School Time on an $82 million budget.

==== Opioid epidemic ====
Kenney created The Mayor's Task Force to Combat the Opioid Epidemic in Philadelphia in 2016. The committee concluded its work and presented a final proposal in May 2017.

In June of that year, Kenney and U.S. Representative Bob Brady negotiated a deal with Conrail, the company that owns abandoned train tracks in Kensington that became a well-known area for open-air heroin use, to clean up the property.

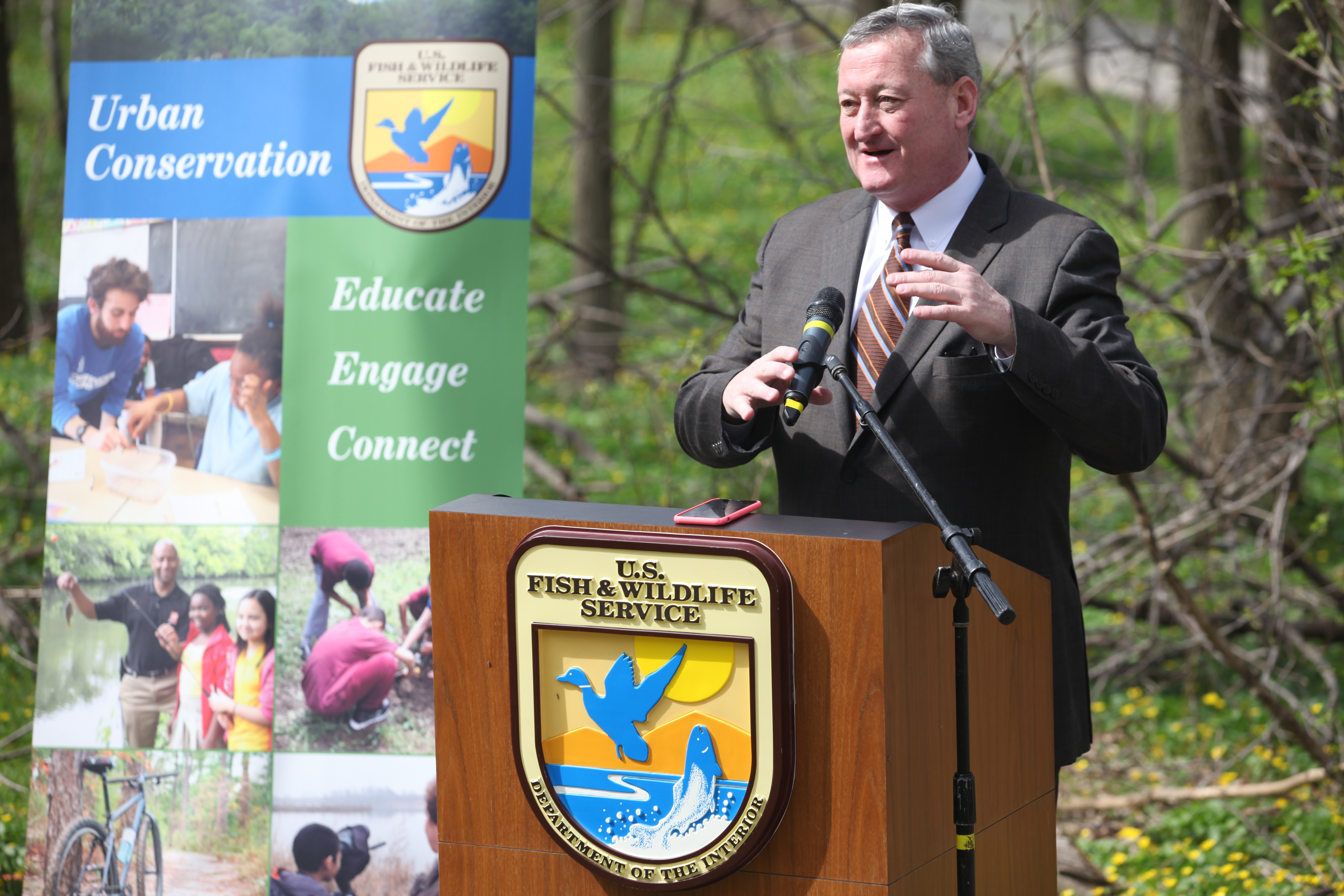
Kenney at an urban national wildlife refuge event in 2016

Kenney has supported opening supervised injection sites within the city. On January 23, 2018, Philadelphia's Public Health Commissioner, Dr. Thomas Farley, announced he wanted the city to establish one or more in the city. He cited Vancouver, stating overdose deaths have been reduced, as has the spread of diseases like HIV and hepatitis C.

Other city officials differ. Philadelphia Police Commissioner Richard Ross has publicly stated he is "totally adamant against" the idea, but has an open mind and a lot of questions. Kenney has also said he supports the recommendation. Pennsylvania Attorney General Josh Shapiro disagreed that the sites were an effective path to treatment and suggested changes would be needed in both state and federal laws in order for such sites to operate legally.

The 3rd Circuit Court of Appeals struck down Kenney's efforts to open safe injection sites. The Court relied on a federal law known as the "Crack House" statute.

==== Climate change ====
Kenney has committed the City of Philadelphia to reduce air pollution and city-wide emissions with specific projects aimed at reforming their respective transit and buildings sectors, areas which are typically responsible for 80 percent total of all citywide emissions and over which mayors have significant authority.

==== Opposition to Donald Trump ====
Before and after Donald Trump's election as President in 2016, Kenney has taken a vocal stand against Trump and his policies. Kenney has maintained that Philadelphia will continue to act as a sanctuary city despite threats that cities would stop receiving federal funding. Trump said, "Here in Philadelphia, murder has been steady—I mean—just terribly increasing."

Kenney, along with Democratic colleagues Representative Dwight Evans, Senator Bob Casey Jr., Councilwoman Helen Gym, and Governor Tom Wolf, joined protesters at Philadelphia International Airport after Trump signed Executive Order 13769 to ban travel from seven majority-Muslim countries.

On October 23, 2019, Kenney endorsed Elizabeth Warren for president in 2020.

On November 6, while the US awaited the final few results of the 2020 election, Kenney gave remarks aimed at Donald Trump: "What the president needs to do is, frankly, put his big boy pants on, acknowledge that he lost, and congratulate the winner." The statement was made in the interest of the nation moving forwards, and Kenney cited several former presidents and presidential candidates, including George H. W. Bush, Jimmy Carter, and Al Gore.

=== Second term (2020–2024) ===
==== Preservation ====
Kenney was criticized at times for his record on historic preservation. After a number of significant historic churches and other buildings were torn down in the face of increased development pressures during Kenney's first mayoral term, former mayor John Street criticized the loss of the city's historic resources and founded a preservationist Political Action Committee in response. In 2021, Josh Lippert, a city inspector who served on the Historic Commission resigned from his post after he said he was pressured by the Kenney Administration to vote against the designation of the 12th Street Gym and the properties adjacent to it. Lippert described a "pattern of interference from the Mayor’s Office" in the historic preservation process.

==== COVID-19 pandemic ====
In March 2020, Kenney declared a state of emergency amid the spread of the COVID-19 pandemic, caused by SARS-CoV-2. The pandemic has resulted in severe social and economic disruption around the world, including the largest global recession since the Great Depression in the 1930s. In Philadelphia, COVID led to widespread supply shortages exacerbated by panic buying, agricultural disruption, and food shortages, as well as increased gun violence, opioid usage, and housing insecurity. Kenney has referred to COVID as a "nuclear bomb" because of the way it affected the city.

On November 19 2021, Kenney announced that all city employees and contractors had to be vaccinated by January 14. The police union expressed their opposition as less than 10% of police officers and 25% of firefighters had been vaccinated at the time of the announcement. The mandate was delayed by Kenney multiple times due to the involvement of an arbitration panel and negotiations with the police union. However, it was ultimately enforced in the summer of 2022.

On December 13 2021, Kenney's health department unveiled their plans to implement a vaccine passport for indoor venues in Philadelphia. The mandate applied to anyone five years and older entering an establishment that served food. Those of the ages 2-5 and anyone with medical or religious exemptions still had to provide a negative Covid test.

==== 2020 Black Lives Matter protests ====
Following his induction into office in January 2016, Mayor Kenney specifically stated "Black Lives Matter" during an event that specifically focused on uplifting neighborhoods within the City of Philadelphia and fighting the effects of poverty. Following this, in July, 2016, Mayor Kenney then appeared on MSNBC's show "Morning Joe". During this broadcast, Mayor Kenney defended the Black Lives Matter movement; defending the organization and their message.

During March of 2017, the Black Lives Matter organization joined local city groups, whilst Mayor Kenney and the Fraternal Order of Police called for the resignation of then Philadelphia District Attorney Seth Williams during corruption charges he was facing.

During the summer of 2020, Kenney approved the use of CS gas on protestors during a peaceful protest, who were blocking traffic, on Interstate 676.

In response to protests over the murder of George Floyd, Mayor Kenney had the Center City statue of Frank Rizzo removed in June 2020. Mayor Kenney also expressed support towards protestors who were marching against police brutality. Though Mayor Kenney agreed with the message behind the protesting, he also criticized individuals who used the marches as a coverup for looting and destruction of the city.

Mayor Kenney faced considerable amounts of criticism for his stance on the civil unrest and his administration's policies. His polices faced the brunt of the criticism, as news outlets and citizens did not believe his policies aligned with his rhetoric towards systematic racism occurring within Philadelphia. News outlets, such as WHYY, argued that Mayor Kenney was "slow" or "indifferent" regarding the timing of his actions.

== Feuds ==
Kenney was known for his outspoken feuds and reports on public figures or groups who attack his legislative agenda, image, or the city of Philadelphia. Early in his career, Kenney was known as a candid and opinionated councilman and mayor, particularly on social media platforms like Twitter. Since his election as Mayor of Philadelphia, Kenney has taken a much more measured tone with respect to his political opponents.

=== Archdiocese ===
Kenney has engaged in numerous feuds with the leadership of the Archdiocese of Philadelphia. Kenney mobilized numerous gay rights legislation during his time in the Philadelphia City Council, many of which were criticized by Catholic leaders in the city. Notably, Kenney joined the debate over the abrupt firing of a beloved faculty member at Waldron Mercy Academy in Merion who came out as gay. In a Philadelphia Inquirer story, Kenney accused the "cowardly men" in the Archdiocese of orchestrating the firing: "If you're a church official and you feel that strongly that this woman and her partner are such a threat to society, stand up and say so," Kenney told the paper. In a 2014 tweet, Kenney stated, "The Arch [sic] don't care about people. It's about image and money. Pope Francis needs to kick some ass here!"

=== Sports talk radio ===
Philadelphia sports radio host Howard Eskin has used his talk show to blast Kenney and his authorization of the sugary drinks tax. In April 2017, Kenney appeared on Eskin's radio station, 94.1 WIP, to contend his claims and promote the 2017 NFL draft in Philly. Kenney attacked Eskin, saying, "Here's what I don't understand about Eskin. First of all, he's in that prime spot of 8–10 a.m. on Saturday mornings... I mean like, it's like the show should be called 'The Sound of One Hand Clapping.' Cause no one hears it." Kenney also jokingly said that he would handle things differently with Eskin if he weren't mayor. "If we were regular people sitting at a bar and he was doing that to me, there would be a consequence," Kenney said. "But because I am an elected official, I can't do it."

=== Chris Christie ===
Former New Jersey Governor Chris Christie, a self-proclaimed Dallas Cowboys fan, has frequently slammed the Philadelphia Eagles, one of the Cowboys' biggest rivals. In early 2017, Christie called Philadelphia fans "angry, awful people" and said Citizens Bank Park, the home of the Philadelphia Phillies, "is not safe for civilized people." Kenney went on a local sports talk radio program to respond to Christie's claims. "He's got the biggest 'L' on his forehead of anybody in the country. He ran for president for one hot-mess minute and then when that was over he was moon-dogging Trump thinking he was going to get a big job," Kenney said. "Now I think he's just bitter and has got nowhere to go. Who's going to hire him? I just think he's just done," Kenney said. "Bullies always lose, and he's a bully."

== Personal life ==
Kenney has two adult children, Nora and Brendan, with his former wife Maureen. Kenney and Maureen separated in 2010. They formally divorced in 2018.

Kenney is engaged to Letitia Santarelli. Santarelli was the head coach of the St. John Neumann and Maria Goretti Catholic School girls basketball team, taking the school to the state championship. The couple started dating in 2015. Kenney first made his relationship with Santarelli public when she accompanied him to Iceland as part of a cultural exchange to mark the first-ever direct flights between Reykjavík and Philadelphia in 2017.

Kenney has been an annual participant in Philadelphia's Mummers Parade.

== See also ==
- List of mayors of the 50 largest cities in the United States
- List of La Salle University people

Political offices
Preceded by Michael Nutter	Mayor of Philadelphia; 2016–2024	Succeeded by Cherelle Parker
