= 1999 Philadelphia mayoral election =

- November 2, 1999
- Turnout: 45% ▲6 pp
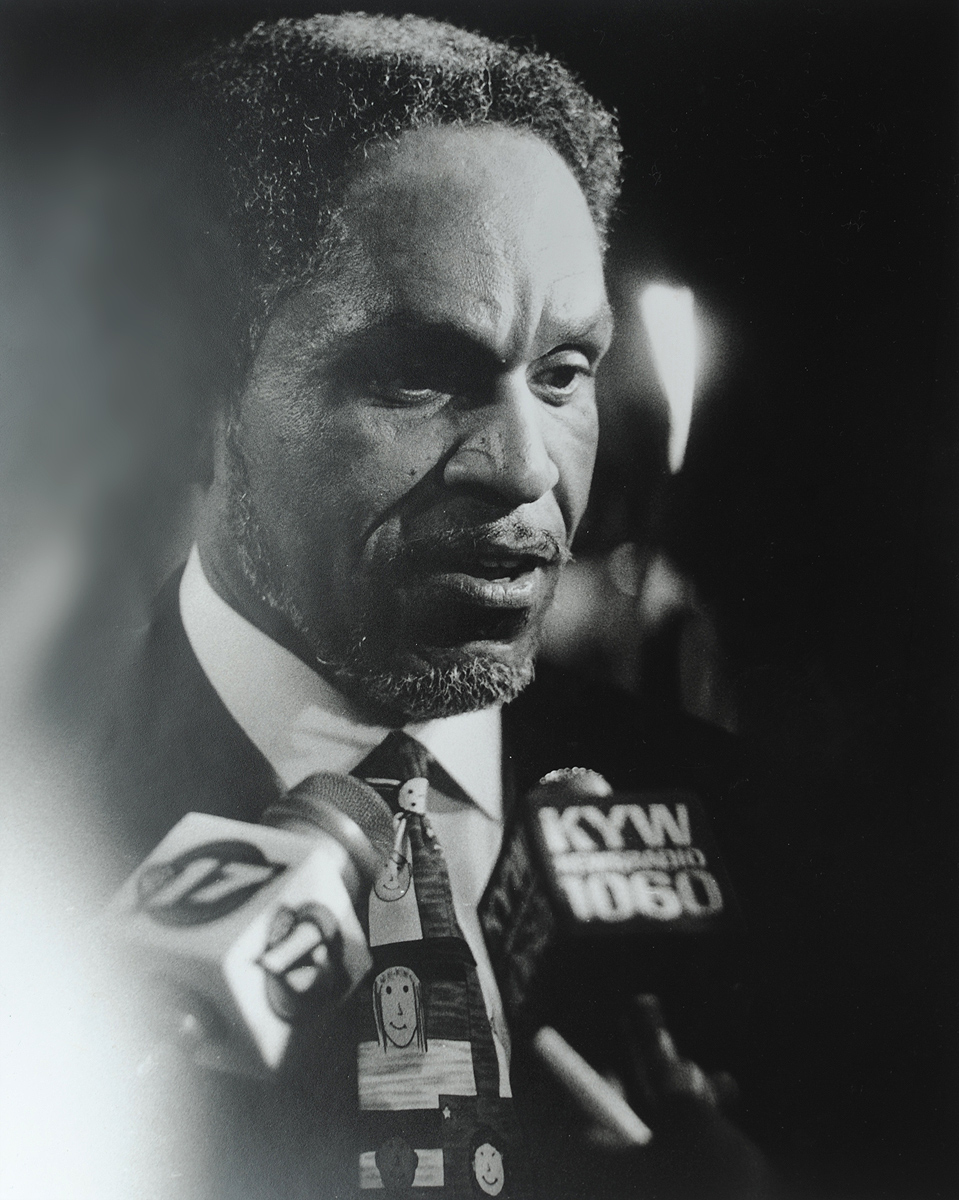

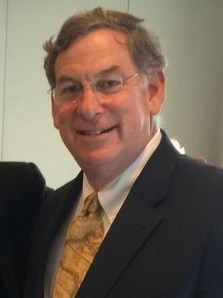
Nominee	John F. Street	Sam Katz
Party	Democratic	Republican
Popular vote	211,136	203,908
Percentage	50.22%	48.50%
- Results by ward Street: 50–60% 60–70% 70–80% 80–90% >90% Katz: 50–60% 60–70% 70–80% 80–90%
Mayor before election
Ed Rendell
Democratic
Elected mayor
John F. Street
Democratic

The 1999 Philadelphia mayoral election was held on November 2, 1999. Incumbent Democratic Mayor Ed Rendell was term-limited and could not seek a third term; he would be elected Governor of Pennsylvania in 2002.

Fellow Democrat John F. Street won the election, defeating Republican Sam Katz. The result was unexpectedly narrow considering Philadelphia’s recognition as a Democratic Party stronghold. Four years later, Street would defeat Katz a second time, but by a much wider margin.

== Democratic primary ==
=== Candidates ===
==== Declared ====
- Queena Bass, activist and former Thomas Jefferson University Hospital employee
- Dwight Evans, State Representative from the 203rd district
- Happy Fernandez, At-Large City Councilwoman
- John F. Street, City Councilman from District 5
- Martin Weinberg, judge and former City Solicitor
- John F. White, Jr., former City Councilman from District 9 and State Representative from the 200th district

==== Declined ====
- Ed Rendell, incumbent Mayor

=== Results ===
Philadelphia mayoral election, 1999
Party	Candidate	Votes	%
Democratic	John F. Street	107,285	36.11
Democratic	Martin Weinberg	91,457	30.78
Democratic	John F. White, Jr.	64,657	21.76
Democratic	Happy Fernandez	18,200	6.13
Democratic	Dwight Evans	13,711	4.62
Democratic	Queena Bass	1,802	0.61
Turnout		297,112	100.00

== Republican primary ==
=== Candidates ===
==== Declared ====
- Sam Katz, candidate for Mayor in 1991

=== Results ===
Philadelphia Republican mayoral primary, 1999
Party	Candidate	Votes	%
Republican	Sam Katz	27,011	100.00
Turnout		27,011	100.00

Sam Katz was unopposed for the Republican nomination.

== General election ==
=== Results ===
Philadelphia mayoral election, 1999
Party	Candidate	Votes	%	±%
Democratic	John F. Street	211,136	50.22	−30.12
Republican	Sam Katz	203,908	48.50	+29.31
Independent	Other	5,376	1.28	+0.46
Majority		7,228	1.72	
Turnout		420,420		
Democratic hold		Swing		
