= John F. Street =

American politician (born 1943)

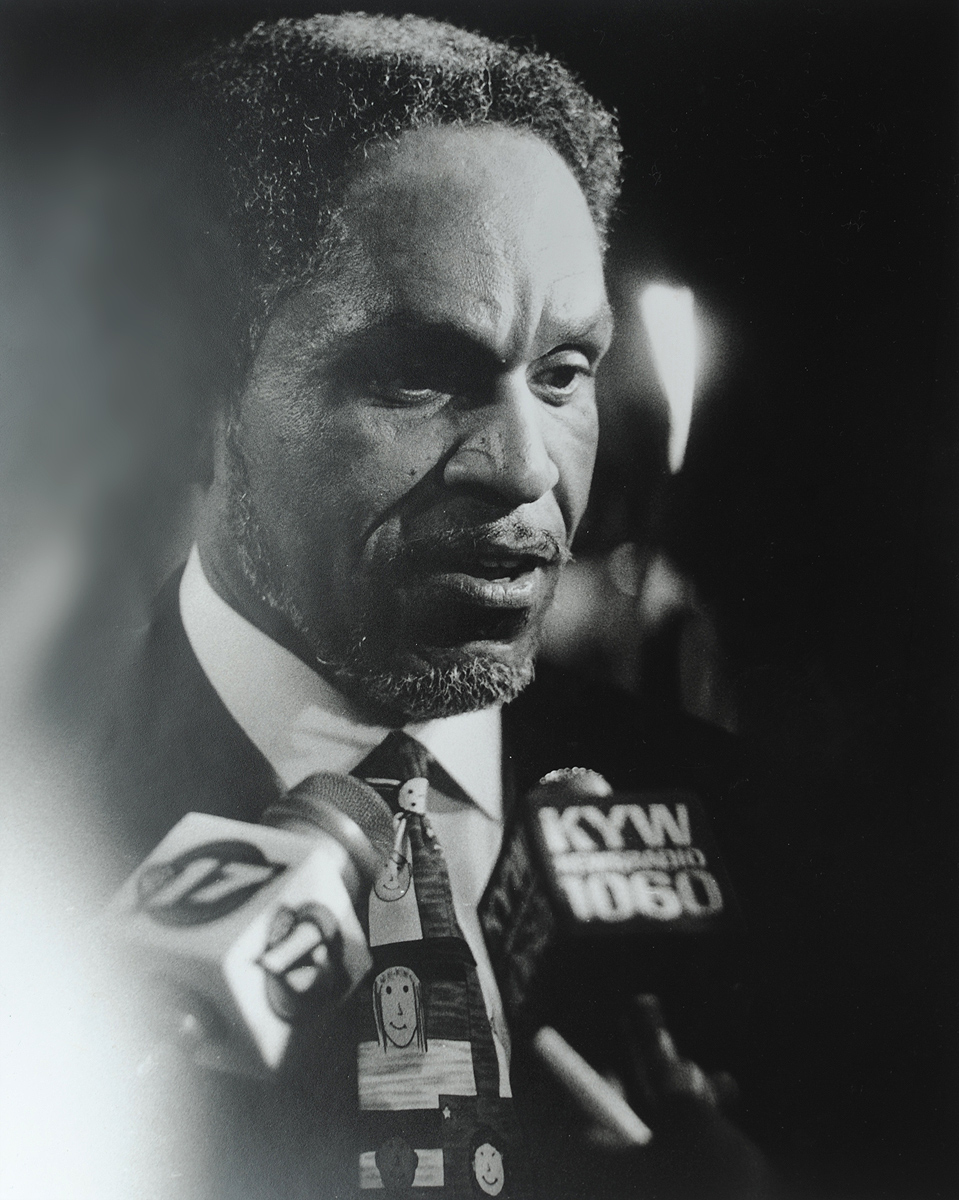
- Street in 1999

97th Mayor of Philadelphia
- In office January 3, 2000 – January 7, 2008
- Preceded by: Ed Rendell
- Succeeded by: Michael Nutter

President of the Philadelphia City Council
- In office January 6, 1992 – December 31, 1998
- Preceded by: Joseph Coleman
- Succeeded by: Anna Verna

Member of the Philadelphia City Council from the 5th district
- In office January 7, 1980 – December 31, 1998
- Preceded by: Cecil B. Moore
- Succeeded by: Darrell Clarke

Personal details
- Born: John Franklin Street; October 15, 1943 (age 83) Norristown, Pennsylvania, U.S.
- Party: Independent (since 2011)
- Other political affiliations: Democratic (until 2011)
- Children: 4, including Sharif Street
- Relatives: Milton Street (brother)
- Education: Oakwood University (BA); Temple University Beasley School of Law (JD)

John Franklin Street (born October 15, 1943) is an American politician and lawyer who served as the 97th mayor of Philadelphia. He was first elected to a term beginning on January 3, 2000, and was re-elected to a second term beginning in 2004. He is a Democrat and became mayor after having served 19 years in the Philadelphia City Council, including seven years as its president, before resigning as required under the Philadelphia City Charter in order to run for mayor. He followed Ed Rendell as mayor, assuming the post on January 3, 2000. Street was Philadelphia's second black mayor.

Street floated the possibility of being a candidate for statewide office in Pennsylvania. In light of corruption scandals, those prospects never materialized. Time Magazine listed him as one of the three worst big-city mayors in the United States in 2005.

== Background and early career ==
Street was born in Norristown, Pennsylvania, and grew up as a member of a farming household. He graduated from Conshohocken High School, received a B.A. degree in English from Oakwood College in Huntsville, Alabama, and his J.D. degree from Temple University, which he had to apply to several times before he was accepted. Following his graduation from law school, Street served clerkships with Common Pleas Court Judge Mathew W. Bullock, Jr. and with the United States Department of Justice from which he was quickly terminated for poor performance. In his first professional job Street taught English at an elementary school and, later, at the Philadelphia Opportunities Industrialization Center (OIC). He then practiced law briefly prior to entering into public service. Street is married and has four children, including Sharif Street, and is a practicing Seventh-day Adventist. His deceased brother, Milton, was a former member of the state legislature, and a two-time mayoral candidate.

Inspired by his brother's successful election in 1978, Street made his initial foray into elected politics in 1979, when he challenged incumbent Fifth District Councilman Cecil B. Moore. Moore was a popular and respected civil rights leader in the city who was active within the NAACP, and Street's decision to challenge him drew the ire of some. Moore, who was in failing health, initially sought to see-off the challenge from Street but died before the May primary. Street won the election, and quelled some of the tensions over his original challenge to Moore by sponsoring a bill to rename the former Columbia Avenue in Moore's honor.

Street was chosen unanimously by members of the Council to serve as President in 1992, after incumbent Joe Coleman retired, and was re-elected in 1996. Street, working closely with former Mayor Ed Rendell, was instrumental in crafting and implementing a financial plan that passed Council unanimously, and turned a $250 million deficit into the largest surplus in city history. Despite decreasing the business and wage tax four years in a row, Philadelphia still has the 10th largest tax burden in the United States. This is due to the financial burden to run the city's prisons, pay debt service, and employee pensions and health benefits.

== Mayor of Philadelphia ==
=== Elections ===
==== 1999 ====
Street was elected in one of the closest elections in Philadelphia history, defeating Republican Sam Katz by a margin of fewer than 7,500.

In an unusual circumstance, the City Council President at the time, Anna Verna, was briefly in the position of running the city before Mayor Street was sworn in, as Rendell resigned the post in December 1999 to become the head of the DNC (per Article III, Chapter 5, Section 3-500 of the Philadelphia Home Rule Charter). In 2001, he was named runner up "Politician of the Year" by PoliticsPA.

==== 2003 ====
Street was once again challenged by Sam Katz in the 2003 mayoral election. Despite an ongoing FBI investigation, Street was aided by Pennsylvania Governor and former Mayor of Philadelphia, Ed Rendell endorsing and campaigning for him. He was named the 2003 Politician of the Year by the political website PoliticsPA, because "It takes an extremely shrewd and effective politician to turn an FBI bugging of the mayor's office into a positive but that's exactly what Mayor John Street did." Street won with 58% of the vote for reelection.

The race was covered in the documentary film The Shame of a City.

=== Policy ===
His relationship with the City Council was tenuous at best. He and former councilman Michael Nutter, who became the 98th Mayor of Philadelphia, often engaged in public political sparring. Regardless, Street ultimately agreed to a 2005 revision of Nutter's New York-style smoking ban (after much public criticism over his failure to support a smoking ban in Philadelphia).

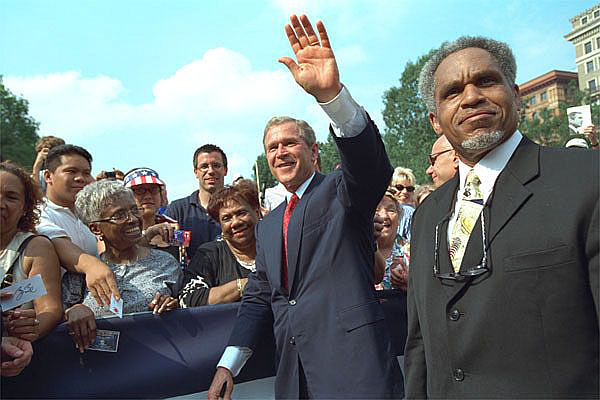
John F. Street with President George W. Bush in Philadelphia during Independence Day in 2001

During Street's first term, much emphasis was placed on the "Neighborhood Transformation Initiative." The Neighborhood Transformation Initiative (NTI), which was unveiled in April 2001 was an unprecedented effort to counter the history of decline in the City of Philadelphia and revitalize its neighborhoods. The program was designed to revitalize and restore communities, to develop or restore quality housing, to clean and secure streets, and to create opportunities for vibrant cultural and recreational facilities.

Initially, opponents raised objections to the program's emphasis on demolishing abandoned buildings rather than seeking re-use or restoration of the sometimes historic properties. Others hailed the program for bringing much-needed investment to the city's many poor neighborhoods. However, initial results have been positive. Since 2000, the average home in Philadelphia has appreciated by approximately 30 percent. The housing market continues to thrive, and developers have created more than 4,880 market-rate apartments and condominiums in the past several years.

Street also made children and their welfare a focus of his first term in office. In his first inaugural address in January 2000, Street officially proclaimed the year 2000 "The Year of the Child" in Philadelphia. He sought to increase funding for after-school programs, and formed the Philadelphia Children's Commission, a diverse group of government, civic, business, and faith-based leadership, whose job it was to advise Street on policies and programs that would have a positive impact in the lives of Philadelphia's children. He also sought to fight truancy among school aged children.

The city's public schools were among the worst in the country when Street took office, and much of his attention early on went into difficult decisions about the schools. In November 2001, a compromise between Street and the Republican-controlled General Assembly allowed for the privatization of the Philadelphia Public Schools. Edison Schools took over day-to-day operations of some of the worst-performing city schools, while a small number were taken over by other institutions, primarily area universities.

In August 2001, the lucrative Philadelphia Parking Authority was taken over by the Pennsylvania government in a compromise designed to help the Philadelphia School District out of its fiscal crisis. Many believed that the Parking Authority's revenues were politically insubstantial in comparison with the high-profile patronage positions on the Parking Authority's board that were transferred from Democratic to Republican hands in the move.

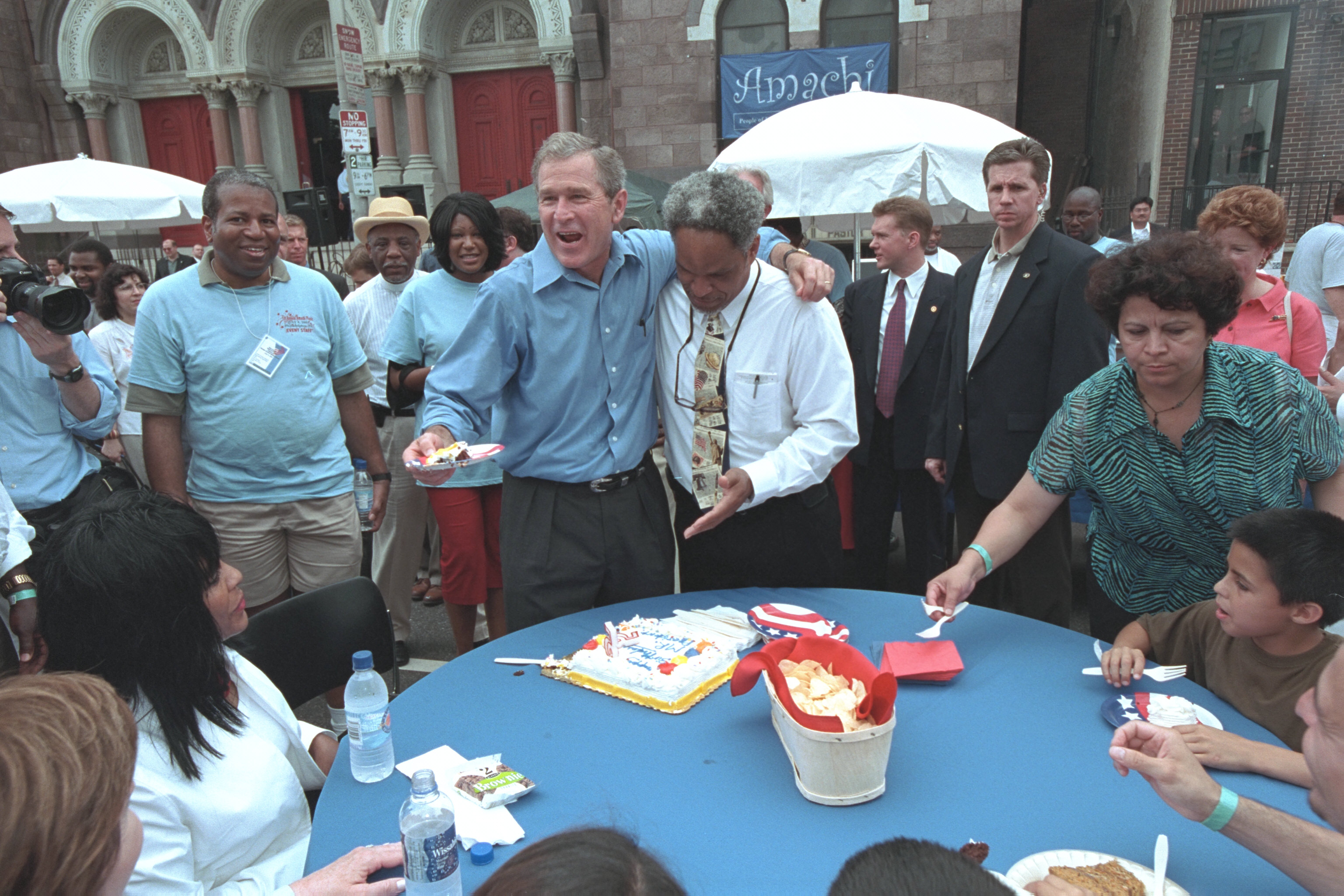
Mayor Street celebrating President George W. Bush's 55th birthday in Philadelphia.

Drawing ire from skateboarders, he banned skateboarding from the internationally famous Love Park after the city had hosted the X-Games in 2001 and 2002 at the Wachovia Center. In 2004, he turned down a $1-million offer from DC Shoes to maintain and renovate the park to allow skating. Instead the city spent $800,000 on adding obstacles to prevent skaters from skating in the park.

Street created the Office of Health and Fitness after the city was named the fattest city in the nation by Men's Fitness magazine in 1999. The magazine cited the low number of athletic facilities and high number of fast-food restaurants. Street also signed into law a smoking ban on September 12, 2006.

Street also advocated the construction of a citywide Wi-Fi network. The network is to be run by the non-profit organization Wireless Philadelphia in partnership with the city and commercial internet service providers. Opponents of the plan suggest that government involvement will quash innovation. Supporters hope that the plan will help bring information access to poor Philadelphians and make the city more attractive to young and educated people.

In a 2002 address at a convention of the NAACP, Street said that "the brothers and sisters are running the city. Oh, yes. The brothers and sisters are running this city. Running it! Don't you let nobody fool you, we are in charge of the City of Brotherly Love. We are in charge! We are in charge!" This observation attracted some criticism and charges of racial divisiveness.

The murder rate in Philadelphia hit a seven-year high during Street's tenure, but the overall trend was significantly lower than in the 1970s under Frank Rizzo. In 2005 there were 380 murders, up from 330 in 2004. Forty-five percent of those murdered were 25 or younger. 2006 saw 406 murders in the city, including a Philadelphia police officer. This murder trend continued to escalate into 2007, with 127 murders occurring by the end of April, 2007, a rate far in excess of the larger cities of New York City, Los Angeles and Chicago. At least one commentator referred to Street as being "strangely silent" in his efforts to reduce the city's murder rate.

On July 27, 2006, Street launched the Adolescent Violence Reduction Partnership (AVRP) as a way to prevent high risk youth (target age 10-15) from being victims of combat violence. He also expanded the Youth Violence Reduction Partnership (YVRP) into the 19th Police District in West Philadelphia.

On September 12, 2007, Philadelphia Police Commissioner Sylvester Johnson, an African-American, supported by Street, called on "10,000 black men" to patrol the streets to lessen crime. On Halloween Day, with the 2007 murder total above 335, a Philadelphia police officer was shot and killed for the second time in as many years (he was the third officer to be shot in a four-day period).

== Controversies ==
=== City Hall corruption scandal ===
During the re-election campaign against Sam Katz, the FBI acknowledged that it had placed listening devices in the Mayor's office as part of a sweeping investigation of municipal corruption. The FBI's investigation uncovered a corruption scheme led by Street's friend and fund raiser Ron White, who died before going to trial. Former city treasurer Corey Kemp, a member of Street's administration, was sentenced to 10 years in jail after being found guilty on 27 corruption-related charges in May 2005. Eventually at least 15 individuals connected to Street were convicted of crimes related to City Hall corruption. One additional prosecution of members of Street's administration took place in the wake of the Kemp conviction and resulted in an acquittal of Mayoral Aide John D. Christmas.

In September 2005, a prominent Muslim clergyman, Shamsud-din Ali, in Philadelphia was sentenced to more than seven years in prison on racketeering and other charges. Prosecutors said the cleric, who was once a member of Mayor John F. Street's transition team, used his political connections to obtain dubious loans, donations and city contracts. Ali was sentenced to 87 months in prison. His conviction was affirmed on July 18, 2007, by the U.S. Court of Appeals for the Third Circuit (493 F.3d 387).

Leonard Ross, a lawyer and close advisor of Mayor Street, who led a committee trying to develop a crucial piece of city-owned property, was charged with fraud and conspiracy in December 2005, and later pleaded guilty to the charges.

The 2003 Philadelphia mayoral election was captured in the documentary film The Shame of a City by Tigre Hill, which gave viewers an inside look at the campaign and portrayed Street in a negative light.

In November 2006, federal authorities charged that Milton Street, Street's older brother, traded on his last name to obtain lucrative city contracts and failed to pay taxes on more than $2 million in income. It was alleged that soon after Mayor Street took office in 2000, Milton Street began hiring himself out as consultant to companies that thought he could help them get city contracts. One company paid Milton Street $30,000 a month consulting fee. Milton Street was found guilty on tax charges.

=== Boy Scout controversy ===
On July 31, 2006, Mayor Street ordered the local Boy Scouts council, Cradle of Liberty Council, to admit gay scout leaders, vacate the city-owned building that it has occupied since 1928, or pay market rent. Although the city subsidizes rental space for more than 75 community and activist organizations, including 14 other youth organizations and several religious groups that have restrictive membership policies, the Mayor took the position that the Boy Scouts were not in compliance with the city's anti-discrimination ordinance. The Scouts argued that the city's action violated their right to freedom of assembly guaranteed under the First Amendment to the United States Constitution. The case ended with the court ruling in favor of the Boy Scouts of America. The Cradle of Liberty Council was also awarded $877,000 for legal costs arising from the city's unlawful action.

== Post-mayoral career ==
John Street's mayoral tenure ended on January 7, 2008. Upon leaving office, Street accepted an adjunct faculty position in the Temple University Department of Political Science. That spring, he taught two sections of a class on urban politics. Asked about his transition from public life to academia, the former mayor was quoted as saying, "You know what? I think I'm really going to like it here!"

Street was Chairman of the Philadelphia Housing Authority (PHA) board when it came under criticism for poor oversight and mismanagement. The board was accused of improprieties in its legal spending, of failing to oversee president Carl R. Greene before he was fired from the agency, and of other ethical violations. Control of the PHA was taken from the city of Philadelphia and given to Housing and Urban Development in 2011 to address these issues and was then returned to the city in 2013 under the direction of a new board.

In 2011, he changed his voter registration from Democrat to Independent. Though Street maintained the switch was only "a means of keeping a variety of options available as a matter of good politics", some had speculated that he intended to challenge incumbent Democratic Mayor Michael Nutter in the 2011 mayoral election. He ultimately did not participate in the primary, and instead his brother Milton Street challenged and lost to Mayor Nutter.

== Mayoral electoral history ==
Philadelphia mayoral election, 1999
Party	Candidate	Votes	%	±%
Democratic	John F. Street	211,136	49.52%	−30.12%
Republican	Sam Katz	203,908	49.12%	+29.31
Independent	Other	5,376	1%	+0.46
Majority				
Turnout				
Democratic hold		Swing		

Philadelphia mayoral election, 2003
Party	Candidate	Votes	%	±%
Democratic	John F. Street	267,230	58.34	+8.70
Republican	Sam Katz	189,357	41.34	−8.28
Socialist Workers	John Staggs	1,291	0.28	
Majority				
Turnout				
Democratic hold		Swing		

== See also ==
- Timeline of Philadelphia, 2000s-present

Political offices
Preceded by Ed Rendell	Mayor of Philadelphia; 2000–2008	Succeeded by Michael Nutter
Philadelphia City Council
Preceded by Joseph Coleman	President of the Philadelphia City Council; 1992–1998	Succeeded by Anna Verna
Preceded by Cecil B. Moore	Member of the Philadelphia City Council for the 5th District; 1980–1998	Succeeded by Darrell Clarke
