= Happy Fernandez =

American politician (1939-2013)

Happy Fernandez (1939 – January 19, 2013) was an American politician. Fernandez was a former Temple University professor. She joined the city council of Philadelphia in 1992 but left on September 28, 1998 to run for mayor.

In 1999, she unsuccessfully ran for Mayor of Philadelphia, becoming the city's first female mayoral candidate. She was born in 1939 in Omaha, Nebraska; her birth name was Gladys Vivian Craven. Fernandez was involved in the Moore College of Art and Design's new expansion and later went on to run the college as president until she retired in 2012.
