= 2003 Philadelphia mayoral election =

- November 4, 2003
- Turnout: 50% ▲5 pp
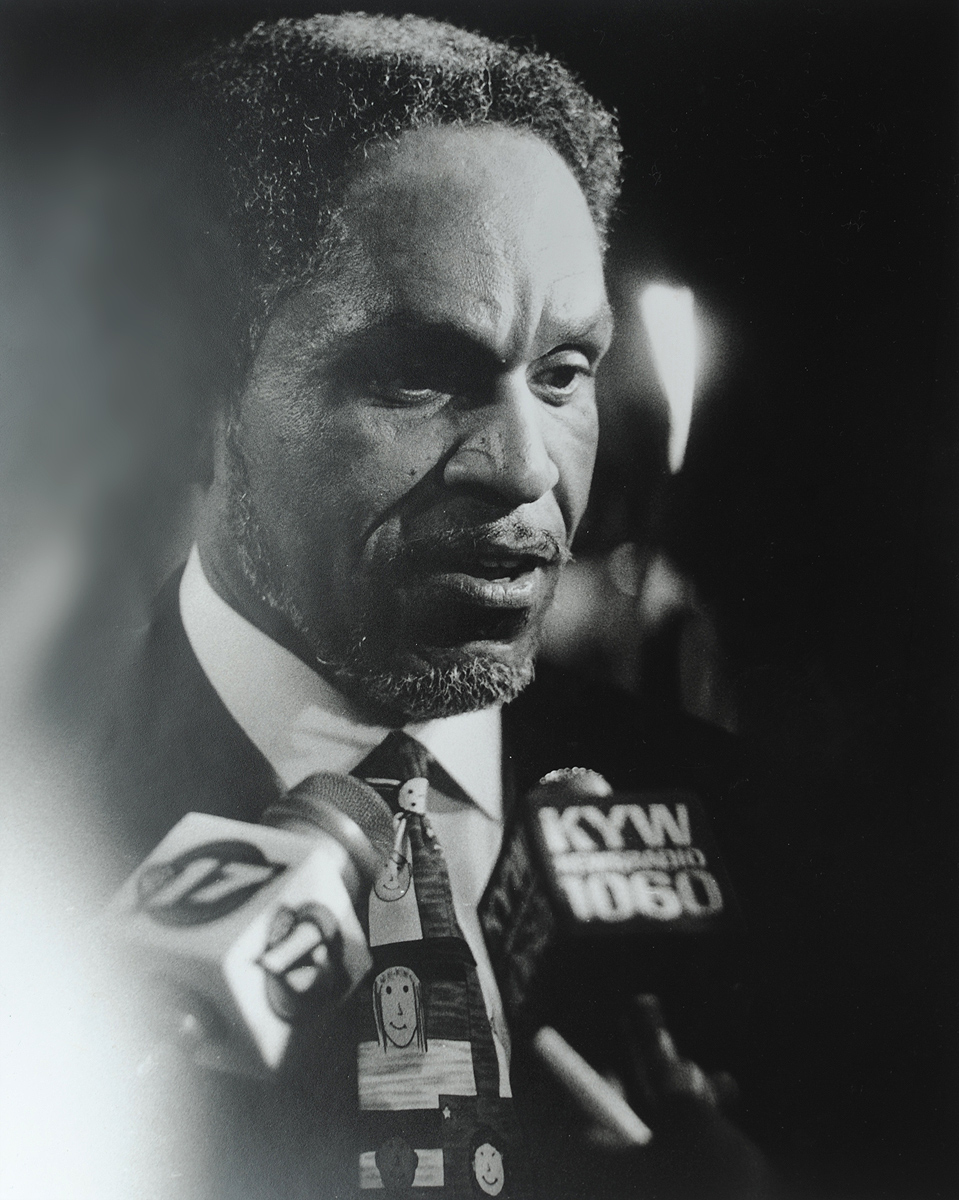

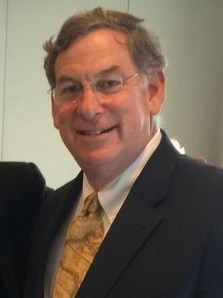
Nominee	John F. Street	Sam Katz
Party	Democratic	Republican
Popular vote	267,230	189,357
Percentage	58.34%	41.34%
- Street: 40–50% 50–60% 60–70% 70–80% 80–90% >90% Katz: 50–60% 60–70% 70–80% 80–90% >90% Tie: 40–50% 50%
Mayor before election
John F. Street
Democratic
Elected mayor
John F. Street
Democratic

The 2003 Philadelphia mayoral election was a contest between Democratic incumbent John F. Street and Republican businessman Sam Katz.

Pennsylvania governor and former mayor of Philadelphia Ed Rendell played a key role for Street by ensuring that business interests did not support Katz.

The race was covered in the documentary film The Shame of a City. This was the last election prior to the 2019 election that saw a Republican nominee carry a ward, with Katz carrying several.

== Democratic primary ==
=== Candidates ===
==== Declared ====
- John F. Street, incumbent Mayor

=== Results ===
Philadelphia Democratic mayoral primary, 2003
Party	Candidate	Votes	%
Democratic	John F. Street	93,799	99.59%
Write-in	All others	387	0.41%
Turnout		94,186	100.00

Mayor John Street was unopposed for renomination by the Democratic Party.

== Republican primary ==
=== Candidates ===
==== Declared ====
- Sam Katz, candidate for mayor in 1991 and 1999

=== Results ===
Philadelphia Republican mayoral primary, 2003
Party	Candidate	Votes	%
Republican	Sam Katz	18,973	99.93
Write-in	All others	14	0.07
Turnout		18,987	100.00

Sam Katz was unopposed for the Republican nomination.

== General election ==
=== Polling ===
Poll source	Date(s) administered	Sample size (Note: Key: A – all adults RV – registered voters LV – likely voters CV – certain voters V – unclear)	Margin of error	John Street (D)	Sam Katz (R)	Other / Undecided
SurveyUSA	October 30 – November 2, 2003	621 (CV)	± 4.0%	59%	37%	4%

=== Results ===
Philadelphia mayoral election, 2003
Party	Candidate	Votes	%	±%
Democratic	John F. Street	267,230	58.34	▲8.70
Republican	Sam Katz	189,357	41.34	▼8.28
Socialist Workers	John Staggs	1,291	0.28	▲0.28
Majority				
Turnout		457,878		
Democratic hold		Swing		

== Notes ==
Preceded by 1999	Philadelphia mayoral election 2003	Succeeded by 2007
