= Sylvester Johnson =

Retired American law enforcement officer

Commissioner of the Philadelphia Police Department
- In office January 4, 2002 – January 7, 2008
- Preceded by: John Timoney
- Succeeded by: Charles H. Ramsey

Personal details
- Spouse: Cynthia
- Children: 3 sons

Sylvester M. Johnson is a retired American law enforcement officer. He served on the Philadelphia Police Department for forty-three years, including six years as the city's 13th Police Commissioner from January 4, 2002, until January 7, 2008.

Johnson joined the Philadelphia police department in 1964 and was soon assigned to the city's Highway Patrol. In 1972 Johnson was awarded the medal of valor, the police department's highest award, for stopping the armed robbery of a supermarket in Cheltenham, Pennsylvania, while off-duty.

Philadelphia Mayor John F. Street appointed Johnson as Police Commissioner to succeed outgoing police chief John Timoney. He took office on January 4, 2002. Johnson was credited with lowering Philadelphia's murder rate during his first year in office. He also improved some community relations. He retired on January 7, 2008.

Police appointments
Preceded by John Timoney	Commissioner of Philadelphia Police Department; 2002–2008	Succeeded by Charles H. Ramsey
