= Ken Trujillo =

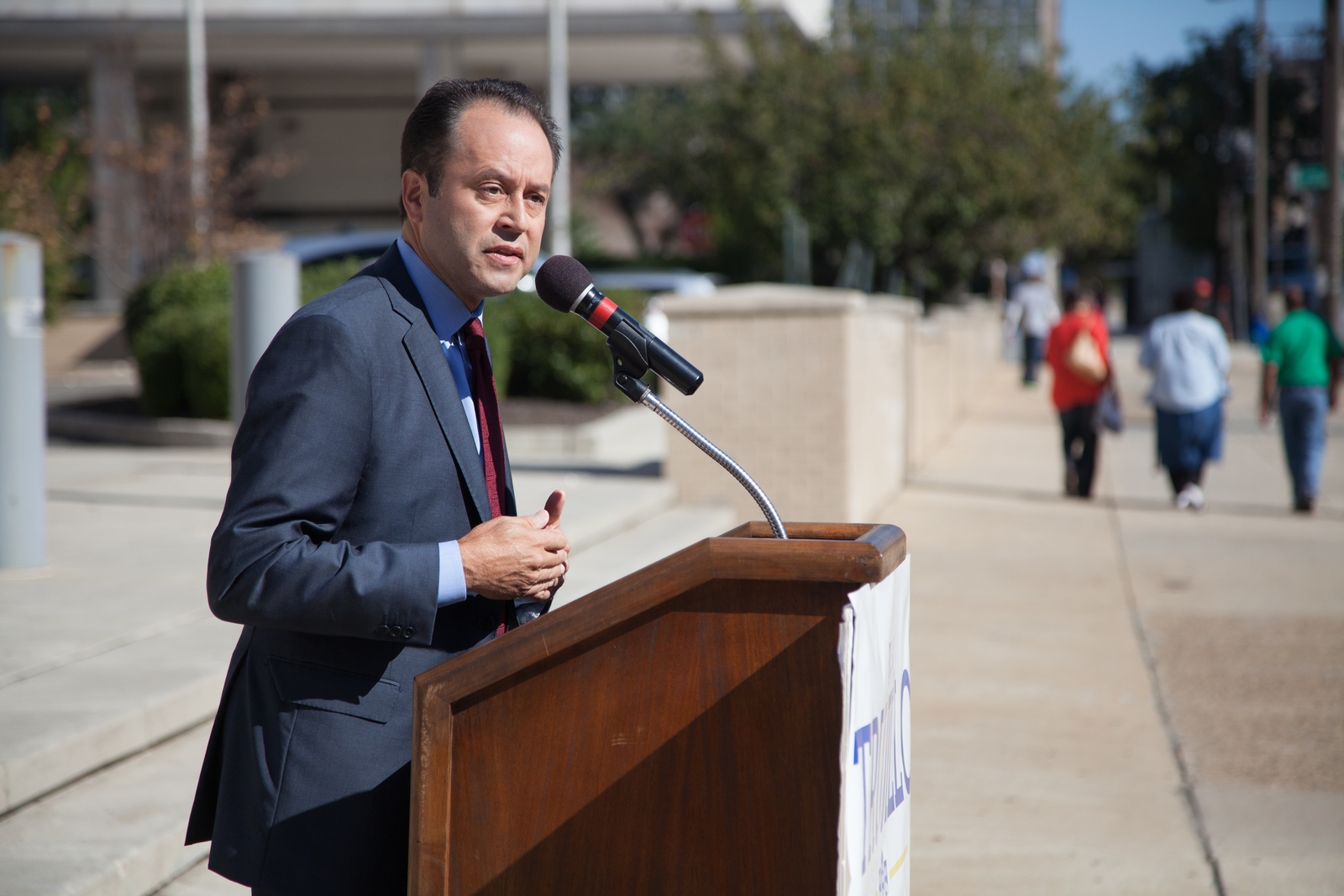
- Born: Española, New Mexico
- Education: Penn Law School
- Political party: Democrat
- Spouse: Laura
- Children: Maya
- Website: kentrujillo.com

Ken Trujillo is a former Democratic candidate for Mayor of Philadelphia. As one of five children in a family often facing poverty, Trujillo attended public schools and became the only one in his family to graduate from college. He then went on to graduate Penn Law School in 1986, where he now teaches as an adjunct professor. Trujillo founded The Food Stamp Clinic in West Philadelphia, worked at Community Legal Aid Services, and spent two decades growing Congreso into one of the largest anti-poverty advocates in the nation. Trujillo also served Philadelphia as City Solicitor and an Assistant U.S. Attorney, winning a historic settlement against gun manufacturers and taking down Philadelphia's largest heroin gang and bank robbery ring. A small business owner, Trujillo founded a successful law practice and purchased historic WHAT 1340 AM, relaunching it as the Spanish-language station El Zol Philly. He was part of President Obama's transition team, and Governor Ed Rendell also appointed Trujillo to oversee Philadelphia's finances as his first appointee to Pennsylvania Intergovernmental Cooperation Authority. In July 2016, he joined the Philadelphia-area office of law firm Chamberlain Hrdlicka. Trujillo lives in Philadelphia with his wife, Laura, and daughter, Maya.

== Early life ==
The son of a minister and a nurses' aide, Ken Trujillo grew up with four sisters living for long stretches in the back of churches where his father ministered. Trujillo is of Mexican descent. Trujillo's family often struggled to get by, having to rely on food stamps at times and school lunch programs.

Trujillo attended public schools and credits his teachers with giving him the tools to become the only one in his family to graduate from college.

Trujillo later earned his J.D. from the University of Pennsylvania Law School in 1986 with the help of student loans and several part-time jobs.

== Career ==
=== US Attorney ===
After graduating from law school, Trujillo was appointed as an Assistant U.S. Attorney, where he successfully prosecuted Philadelphia's largest heroin gang and the biggest bank robbery ring in city history.

=== City Solicitor ===
Trujillo's success in the courtroom earned him the position of Philadelphia's City Solicitor. As the city's top lawyer, he brought a lawsuit against gun manufacturers and reached an historic settlement with Smith & Wesson.

=== Business ===
In 1997, Trujillo started his own firm, Trujillo Rodriguez & Richards. The firm ultimately combined with top Philadelphia firm Schnader Harrison Segal & Lewis. In 2011, Trujillo purchased WHAT 1340 AM and relaunched the station as Spanish-language radio El Zol Philly. In 2016, he left Schnader Harrison Segal & Lewis and joined the Philadelphia-area office of Houston-based Chamberlain Hrdlicka.

== Public Service ==
=== Nonprofit Work ===
While at Penn Law, Trujillo joined with other students to start The Food Stamp Clinic in West Philadelphia. Since 1990, he has helped build Congreso, which provides underserved communities with education, job training, and housing and health care services, into one of the leading anti-poverty organizations in Philadelphia. He and his wife, Laura, have also worked for many years with Community Legal Services to provide free legal services to low income Philadelphians, who otherwise would have gone unrepresented at trial. He also holds a position on the Community Leadership Board for the Greater Philadelphia Area American Diabetes Association.

=== Political Involvement ===
Trujillo was appointed to President Obama's transition team where he made recommendations on how to reform the Securities and Exchange Committee Commission. Pennsylvania Governor Ed Rendell also appointed him to oversee Philadelphia's finances as his first appointee to Pennsylvania Intergovernmental Cooperation Authority. In January 2015, he withdrew from the Mayoral race due to extended family matters.

== Personal life ==
Ken first met his wife, Laura, on a blind date set up by their families at the local American Legion Hall. They have been married for almost twenty years, and live with their daughter, Maya, in Philadelphia.
