= Sam Katz (American politician) =

American politician

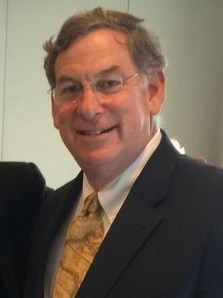
- Katz in 2015
- Born: Samuel Polen Katz; December 28, 1949 (age 76); Philadelphia, Pennsylvania, U.S.
- Education: Johns Hopkins University (B.A.); The New School (M.A.)
- Occupations: Businessman; Political candidate
- Known for: Three-time candidate for Mayor of Philadelphia
- Political party: Independent (2007–2008, 2015–present)
- Other political affiliations: Democratic (1976–1990, 2008–2012); Republican (1990–2007)
- Spouse: Connie Hackel (m. 1971)
- Children: 4
- Website: historymakingproductions.com

Samuel Polen Katz (born December 28, 1949) is an American politician from Philadelphia, Pennsylvania. He was the Republican nominee for Mayor of Philadelphia in 1999 and 2003, nearly winning the election in the overwhelmingly Democratic city. His loss to the controversial John F. Street was covered in the documentary The Shame of a City.

== Early life and career ==
Born in West Philadelphia, Katz grew up in a Jewish family in the Wynnefield neighborhood where his family were members of Har Zion Temple. A 1967 graduate of Central High School in Philadelphia, Katz earned a BA in political science from Johns Hopkins University in 1971 and an MA in urban affairs and policy analysis from The New School for Social Research in 1974. He worked for the Greater Philadelphia Partnership as a Research Analyst before co-founding Public Financial Management, Inc., which advises local and state governments on raising capital. After leaving PFM, he worked in a number of business ventures.

== Political career ==
Katz began in politics as a Democrat, having worked as a campaign manager for Congressman Bill Gray and Congressman Bill Green. He later worked on Wilson Goode's 1983 campaign for mayor, but broke with Goode in 1987 and supported former mayor Frank Rizzo.

He switched to the Republican Party (GOP) in 1990 and made his first run for Mayor of Philadelphia in 1991. He ran third in the Republican primary election behind Rizzo and Philadelphia district attorney Ron Castille. After Rizzo's death in July, Joe Egan replaced him as the nominee, and Katz served as his campaign manager.

In 1994, Katz campaigned for Governor of Pennsylvania in a primary race that featured Congressman Tom Ridge, State Attorney General Ernie Preate and Mike Fisher. Even though Katz had endorsements from the Philadelphia newspapers, and State Auditor General Barbara Hafer, Katz finished third in the four-way primary, receiving little support outside Philadelphia.

=== 1999 ===
1999 was the year in which Katz emerged from the Republican field, running unopposed in the GOP primary for mayor. He was selected as the candidate to run for mayor against city council president John Street who withstood a negative advertising barrage to win a divisive Democratic primary.

Katz, running as a moderate to liberal Republican, ran on a platform of cutting the high wage taxes in the city and bringing back businesses which had fled. Street ran citing his support of the Rendell administration's policies which many had felt rescued the city from a financial crisis. With a 75% voter registration advantage for the Democratic Party, Katz faced an uphill battle.

The race turned out to be racially divisive with Street holding 94% support of the African-American majority wards and Katz boasting support from about 80% of the white-majority wards. Although both of the city's major daily newspapers, the Philadelphia Inquirer and the Philadelphia Daily News endorsed Katz's candidacy, in the end, Street held on to a slight 7,200-vote plurality on election day. This is the closest that a Republican has come in recent memory to winning a mayoral election.

Between the 1999 and 2003 campaigns for mayor, he was the CEO of Greater Philadelphia First.

=== 2003 ===
After his close 1999 defeat, Katz was ready for a 2003 rematch with Street. Despite a good local economy and some success in bringing development to the city, the mayor was unpopular in many circles due to several corruption scandals which had come to light during the mayor's term. None of the scandals were attributed to the mayor personally, but investigations of many in his inner circle (including his brother Milton) were a cause for concern for many residents. Katz's 2003 platform went back to the issue of wage and business tax cuts, but also included an anti-corruption platform to take advantage of the atmosphere in the city.

With Katz running strong, the entire election changed in October, 2003 when a sweep of the mayor's office turned up a listening device. The Federal Bureau of Investigation (FBI) admitted that they had planted the device, although the mayor, himself, was not a target of the probe. At first, it seemed that the discovery could seriously hurt Street's re-election bid. However, Street deftly turned the issue around on his opponent. The campaign attacked the FBI for targeting a black mayor in the middle of the campaign. Street was able to use the issue to tie Katz to President Bush, who was unpopular in the city.

The move worked, bringing liberal white voters back into the Democratic camp. By election day, Street had opened up an insurmountable lead and won 58% of the vote. The race was captured in the documentary film The Shame of a City, by Tigre Hill.

== Post-political career ==
In 2007, Katz left the Republican Party and re-registered as an independent, then changed his affiliation to the Democratic Party in 2008. Katz was then a registered Republican from 2012 to 2015 before leaving the party again to be an independent.

Katz was named to the PoliticsPA list of "Sy Snyder's Power 50" list of influential individuals in Pennsylvania politics in 2002 and 2003. The Pennsylvania Report named him to the 2003 "The Pennsylvania Report Power 75" list of influential figures in Pennsylvania.

== Personal life ==
Katz married Connie Hackel in 1971; they have four children.
