= 1960 Philadelphia City Council special election =

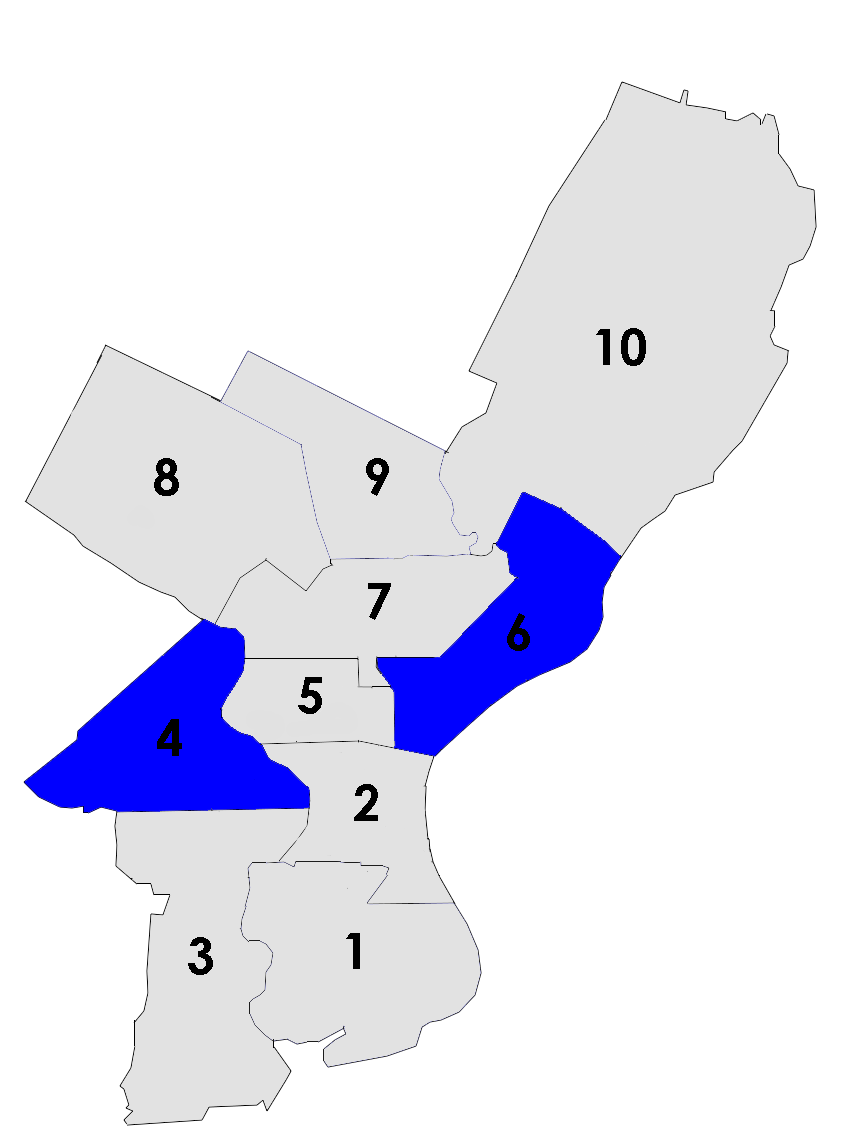
The 4th and 6th councilmanic districts in 1960

The 1960 Philadelphia City Council special election was held to fill two vacant city council seats. The first was in the 4th district, when Democrat Samuel Rose died in January 1960. A second vacancy that same year occurred in the 6th district when Democrat Michael J. Towey died suddenly in September 29. Special elections were scheduled for November 8, 1960, to be held at the same time as the national election that year. Both seats were easily held by the Democratic Party.

== Background ==
Samuel Rose had represented West Philadelphia's 4th district since its creation under the new City Charter of 1951. After suffering a heart attack in 1959, his health declined and he died on January 31, 1960, at the age of 48. The district was viewed as a solid seat for the Democrats; Rose had won re-election in 1959 with 73% of the vote.

Michael J. Towey died on September 29, 1960, also of a heart attack. Towey had represented the 6th district, which covered Kensington, Port Richmond, and Frankford, also since 1951. He had won convincingly in his most recent election, carrying 60% of the vote over his Republican opponent.

== Candidate selection ==
Instead of a primary, the nominees were selected by the ward leaders of the wards that made up the councilmanic districts. In the 4th, Democratic ward leaders selected George X. Schwartz, an attorney who had represented part of the district in the Pennsylvania House of Representatives for three terms. Republicans nominated Leonard G. Carr, the pastor of Vine Memorial Baptist Church and a civil rights advocate.

After Towey's death, Council President James Tate ordered a special election to be held the same day, just over a month later. As in the 4th, candidates were chosen by the ward leaders. Democrats selected William A. Dwyer Jr., a lawyer and the leader of the 23rd Ward, over several challengers. Republicans selected Joseph T. Murphy, also an attorney.

== Result ==
Schwartz and Dwyer easily won their elections, "swamping" their Republican opponents, according to a story the next day in The Philadelphia Inquirer. Democrats carried every ward in the two districts amid a citywide victory for the party in the presidential race. Schwartz took 75% of the vote, bettering Rose's totals from 1959. Dwyer likewise improved on Towey's 1959 margin in the district.

1960 Philadelphia city council special election, district 4
Party	Candidate	Votes	%	±%
Democratic	George X. Schwartz	60,285	75.44	+1.85
Republican	Leonard G. Carr	19,625	24.56	−1.85

1960 Philadelphia city council special election, district 6
Party	Candidate	Votes	%	±%
Democratic	William A. Dwyer Jr.	57,891	65.68	+5.36
Republican	Joseph T. Murphy	30,244	34.32	−5.36

== Aftermath ==
Schwartz remained on city council for twenty years, rising to become the council president. He remained a force on the Council until he was forced to resign after being implicated in the Abscam investigation. He served a year in prison and died at the age of 95 in 2010. His opponent, Carr, did not run for office again but remained the pastor of his church until his death in 1976.

Dwyer served out the remainder of the term to which he had been elected, but lost a re-election bid to Republican Edward F. McNulty in 1963. He was elected to a judgeship on the Pennsylvania Court of Common Pleas in 1967 and served there until his death in 1982. Murphy joined him on the bench, being appointed to the Philadelphia Municipal Court in 1968 and the Common Pleas Court in 1972. He took senior status on the court in 1980 and heard cases until 1991; he died the following year.

== See also ==
- List of members of Philadelphia City Council since 1952

== Sources ==
- "City Vote Cast For Candidates". The Philadelphia Inquirer. November 5, 1959 – via Newspapers.com.
- "Samuel Rose Dies; Councilman Was 48". The Philadelphia Inquirer. February 1, 1960. p. 7 – via Newspapers.com.
- "George X. Schwartz Will Run For Council". The Philadelphia Inquirer. September 2, 1960. p. 15 – via Newspapers.com.
- "Pastor To Run For City Council". The Philadelphia Inquirer. September 9, 1960. p. 11 – via Newspapers.com.
- "Michael Towey Dies; City Councilman, 58". The Philadelphia Inquirer. September 30, 1960. p. 12 – via Newspapers.com.
- "Nov. 8 Election Is Set For City Council Seat". The Philadelphia Inquirer. October 7, 1960. p. 6 – via Newspapers.com.
- "Dwyer Nominee In Council Race". The Philadelphia Inquirer. October 12, 1960. p. 6 – via Newspapers.com.
- "Democrats Retain 2 Seats in Council". The Philadelphia Inquirer. November 9, 1960. p. 7 – via Newspapers.com.
- Bulletin Almanac 1961. Philadelphia, Pennsylvania: The Philadelphia Bulletin. 1961. OCLC 8641470.
- "Rev. Leonard Carr, of W. Phila". The Philadelphia Inquirer. June 22, 1976. p. 5-D – via Newspapers.com.
- "W. Dwyer, 68, Judge in Phila". The Philadelphia Inquirer. December 14, 1982. p. 25-A – via Newspapers.com.
- "Phila. Judge Joseph T. Murphy, 'hard-working, well-respected'". The Philadelphia Inquirer. October 16, 1992. p. B19 – via Newspapers.com.
- Anastasia, George (March 27, 2010). "George Schwartz, Abscam Figure, Is Dead at 95". The Philadelphia Inquirer. p. A1 – via Newspapers.com.
