= David Cohen (politician) =

American politician (1914–2005)

David Cohen (November 13, 1914 – October 3, 2005) was an American lawyer, Democratic civil servant and politician. For the last 26 years of his life, he was a Philadelphia city councilman representing the northwest district. Having served a four-year term not consecutive to the other terms, he represented northwest Philadelphia for a total of 29 years. He died in office aged 90.

Cohen was a local Democratic and community leader during the mayoral administrations of Philadelphia Mayors Joseph S. Clark Jr. and Richardson Dilworth, a councilman during the administration of Mayor James Tate and the police commissionership of Mayor Frank Rizzo, and a councilman in the mayoral administrations of Mayors William J. Green III, Wilson Goode, Ed Rendell, and John F. Street. He served nearly 14 full years in City Council with future mayor Michael Nutter (who was elected mayor two years after Cohen's death). His views on city issues were often at odds with the majority in city government. Rendell described him as the most tenacious political leader he ever met.

Cohen supported labor unions, collective bargaining, racial integration, desegregation, and equal opportunity since the late 1930s. He campaigned with planks of civil rights, workers rights, good government, constituent service and geographic inclusiveness.

In his first term on the City Council, he successfully sponsored in 1970 an air pollution measure, and emphasized it in his next campaign. His chemical right-to-know bill, in 1982, was one of the nation's first. He opposed waste incineration within the city, successfully in the case of a proposed plant near the Philadelphia Naval Yard. During his tenure, two long existing waste facilities were shut down. He claimed that these curtailments in waste facility operations produced a saving of $1.5 billion in trash disposal costs over thirty years and enhanced the attractiveness of the city areas of South Philadelphia, Northern Liberties, and Roxborough as targets for development.

In 1995, Cohen declared himself "a Franklin D. Roosevelt Democrat", and thereafter refused any other public comment on supporting political alliances in the city.

At his death in 2005 at age 90, Cohen was one of the oldest American elected leaders in office, serving at large on the City Council.

== Early political career ==
Cohen, a child of Ukrainian Jewish immigrants, was born in south Philadelphia. Cohen first became active in politics as a campaign worker for Democratic mayoral nominee John B. Kelly Sr. in 1935. He was appointed an attorney for the Rural Electrification Administration in Washington, D.C., in 1938 after graduating first in his class from the University of Pennsylvania Law School in 1937 and winning a graduate fellowship. As a graduate fellow, Cohen did research used for upholding the constitutionality of Pennsylvania's law providing for a minimum wage equal to the federal minimum wage for some people not covered by the federal minimum wage. As a Rural Electrification Administration attorney, Cohen drafted state laws for various states and became president of the agency union and participated in negotiations with two Secretaries of Agriculture.

Cohen resigned his position with the federal government in 1943, then located in St. Louis, Missouri, as the federal government dispersed federal agencies around the country to forestall an enemy attack on them in World War II, to prepare to enter the U.S. Army. Briefly working for the St. Louis Congress of Industrial Organizations while awaiting the completion of enlistment processing, Cohen made the transition from volunteer union leader to union staffer.

His first job after returning from New Guinea in the South Pacific theater, where he had reached the rank of the rank of staff sergeant, the highest rank for a non-commissioned officer, after declining to attend Officer Candidate School, was to legally represent federal union employees in New York City, where his wife's family lived, and help them unionize. In one case, after independent journalist I. F. Stone interviewed him, he recruited Stone as a volunteer legal aide so that Stone could get a first hand view of the obstacles facing union workers.

After an unsuccessful run for Judge of Elections in 1953, Cohen was elected a Democratic committeeman in his division in 1954. He later became Treasurer of the 49th Ward Democratic Executive Committee, President of the Northwest Philadelphia Chapter of the American Jewish Congress, and head of the Northwest Philadelphia Chapter of the Community Chest. He also was active in the Jewish War Veterans, and often cited his experiences dealing with soldiers from rural areas in Missouri, running a health care clinic for soldiers in New Guinea and giving them legal advice as formative ones.

He spent the end of 1964 gathering information about violations of African-American voting rights in Mississippi in support of the challenge to the seating in Congress of Mississippi's Congressional delegation.

Following the one man, one vote decisions of the U.S. Supreme Court, the wards of Philadelphia were redistricted, and the 49th Ward was split in half. Cohen was elected Democratic leader of the 17th Ward in 1966, and was continuously reelected henceforth. In 2002, he became the most senior Democratic ward leader in the City of Philadelphia, and he continued to serve as the 17th Ward Democratic leader until his death.

== City council ==
City Council redistricting left Northwest Philadelphia without an incumbent councilman, and Cohen was elected to that position in 1967, quintupling the November victory margin of the previous incumbent.

Sworn in as a member of City Council in 1968, Cohen became a leader of the independent factions of the City Council, and worked to focus the City Council on previously slighted problems dealing with zoning, public health care, air pollution, governmental ethics, delivery of city services, and race relations. Elected a delegate to the 1968 Democratic National Convention, Cohen supported the Presidential campaigns of Robert F. Kennedy and Eugene McCarthy, and frequently spoke at rallies opposing the War in Vietnam.

Cohen resigned to run for Mayor of Philadelphia in 1971. After failing to garner adequate support to win the Democratic mayoral nomination, he withdrew and supported Congressman William J. Green III, who lost to former Philadelphia Police Commissioner Frank Rizzo.

Cohen remained active in Philadelphia politics and civic life, campaigning for George McGovern, running unsuccessfully for the Democratic nomination for City Controller in 1973 and for Councilman at large in 1975. He joined an unsuccessful effort to recall Mayor Rizzo in 1976 after Rizzo, who had won two elections opposing tax increases, pushed through the largest tax increase in Philadelphia history. Cohen was one of the leaders of the successful opposition to Mayor Rizzo's campaign to amend the City Charter in order to allow Rizzo to seek a third consecutive term as mayor.

He returned to the Philadelphia City Council in 1980, this time as a Councilman at Large. He began his tenure by working to make the rules of City Council more effective and democratic. When City Council President George X. Schwartz, Council Majority Leader Harry Jannotti, and Councilman Louis Johanson were taped accepting bribes from FBI agents posing as Arab sheiks in the nationally prominent Abscam scandals, he and freshman councilman John F. Street, who later became Mayor of Philadelphia, began regularly demanding explanations and resignations from the implicated City Council members. When Schwartz resigned as City Council President in the fall of 1980, Cohen backed his successor as District Councilman in the 8th Councilmanic District, Joseph E. Coleman, whom Cohen had defeated in 1967 for the Democratic nomination, as Council President. Coleman, the first African-American to serve as Council President, later appointed Cohen as Chairman of City Council's Rules Committee.

Cohen's 25 years as at large councilman were the longest tenure in that position since it was created by City Charter amendment in 1951. Throughout it, Cohen was an independent voice in City Council, actively examining and often seeking to modify or defeat the proposals of Mayors William J. Green III, Wilson Goode, Ed Rendell, and John F. Street.

== Advanced years ==
Celebrating his 90th birthday as a member of City Council on November 13, 2004, Cohen told The Philadelphia Inquirer he would not retire from City Council and would run for reelection in 2007.

Over 500 people attended a "Tribute to Change" reception at the University of Pennsylvania, held to raise money to fund Bread and Roses, a Philadelphia charitable foundation, and to honor him and his wife Florence Cohen for their lifetimes of activism, on September 12, 2005. The event, held near the law school where he had graduated first in his class more than 68 years earlier, turned out to be his last public appearance before his death.

== Personal background ==
In 1946, Cohen married Florence Herzog, whom he had met when she too worked for the Rural Electrification Administration. Together they had four children. His wife headed a community organization, the Ogontz Area Neighbors Association, and two political organizations, the 17th Ward Democratic Women's Club and the New Democratic Coalition of Philadelphia. From January 1980 until her retirement in September 1996, she served as his City Council Chief of Staff.

His son Denis P. Cohen served for 24 years as an assistant district attorney, and was a leader of the Philadelphia Bar Association. His son Mark B. Cohen is a Judge of the Court of Common Pleas in Philadelphia. He was sworn in on January 2, 2018. His daughter Sherrie Cohen was a trial lawyer in Florida and Philadelphia, as well as an activist for public, political, and gay causes. His daughter Judy Cohen Minches was a reporter in New Jersey, a leader in her synagogue, and a mother of three.

== Death ==
David Cohen died on October 3, 2005, at the age of 90, after a hospitalization at Albert Einstein Medical Center, a few blocks from his home of 53 years. The cause of death was heart failure, although he had entered the hospital for kidney failure. The Philadelphia Inquirer columnist Claude Lewis, a longtime observer of Philadelphia politics, metaphorically suggested in an October 5, 2005 column that he had died of heart failure because "he used his heart so much."

He was buried in Har Nebo Cemetery in the Oxford Circle section of Philadelphia. His grave is located at the intersection of Israel and Shalom streets near entrance number 2. On his gravestone, unveiled on October 22, 2006, are the words "conscience of the city."
