= Muhammad Kenyatta =

American professor

- Born: Donald Brooks Jackson; March 3, 1944; Chester, Pennsylvania, U.S.
- Died: January 3, 1992 (aged 47); Buffalo, New York, U.S.
- Education: Williams College; Harvard Divinity School; Harvard Law School
- Occupations: Activist; academic
- Political party: Democratic
- Spouse: Mary Kenyatta
- Children: 3
- Relatives: Malcolm Kenyatta (grandson)

Muhammad I. Kenyatta (born Donald Brooks Jackson; March 3, 1944 – January 3, 1992), was an American professor, civil rights leader, and international human rights advocate.

In the 1960s, he worked for the Mississippi Freedom Democratic Party, which challenged the denial of voting rights to African Americans in Mississippi. In 1969 he was elected national vice-president of the Black Economic Development Conference and President of the Greater Philadelphia branch of the organization which was focused on ending poverty in communities of color which they outlined in a revolutionary document referred to as the 'Black Manifesto'. In 1975, Kenyatta had an unsuccessful run for Democratic nomination for mayor of Philadelphia, Pennsylvania against Frank Rizzo.

Kenyatta was a fellow in the Harvard Divinity School and Harvard Law School and led a boycott against minority hiring practices at Harvard. He was also active in international human rights education and advocacy through the United Nations and TransAfrica organizations.

== Early life and education ==
Kenyatta was born and raised in Chester, Pennsylvania. He was ordained a minister in the Calvary Baptist Church in Chester at the age of 14. He attended Lincoln University in Pennsylvania then joined the United States Air Force at age 17 when he could no longer afford tuition. Jackson changed his name in the early 1970s to Muhammad Kenyatta.

In 1981, Kenyatta received his bachelor's degree from Williams College. Kenyatta attended Harvard Divinity School, where he was a Merrill Fellow (1973–74). He earned his Juris Doctor degree three years later from Harvard Law School and was a Harvard fellow in public interest law in 1984-85 for the Pan African Project.

== Career ==
In the mid to late 1960s Kenyatta was an organizer for the Head Start Program that provided early childhood education and health services to impoverished children and their families. In the 1970s, he supported the occupation of a building owned by Quakers demanding they pay reparations. Although the Quakers were some of the earliest slaveholders, they were also the earliest abolitionists.

He also worked for the Mississippi Freedom Democratic Party, a group that challenged the denial of voting right to African Americans in Mississippi. It was at this time that he received a letter found to have been forged by three F.B.I. agents working in the COINTELPRO program that was aimed at disrupting and discrediting people considered dangerously radical. The letter threatened Kenyatta with warnings to stay away from Tougaloo College in Mississippi, where he had been a student. He left Mississippi, but later sued the Government for violating his constitutional right to free speech. A university spokesman, Arthur Page, said the suit finally came to trial in Jackson, Mississippi, in 1985, but the jury did not decide in his favor.

Back in Philadelphia Kenyatta continued his activism. In 1969 he was elected as national Vice President of the Black Economic Development Conference which set as its guiding document the Black Manifesto which among many things called for reparations for black people.

=== Harvard University boycott ===
Kenyatta gained prominence in the Harvard community as an organizer of a nationally controversial boycott of a Law School civil rights course. The boycott protested the assignment of Jack Greenberg, director-counsel of the NAACP Legal Defense Fund, as co-instructor of the class "Racial Discrimination and Civil Rights." The course had previously been offered by Derrick Bell, one of the few black members of the law faculty, who left Harvard in 1981 to become dean of the University of Oregon Law School. Students had hoped the Law School administration would add a minority faculty member to its 58-man, one-woman, one-Black tenured staff. Instead, Harvard appointed a white professor, Greenberg, and J. Levonne Chambers, Black president of the NAACP fund.

As the president of the Black Law Students Association (BLSA), Kenyatta was an active spokesman for the boycott both inside and outside Harvard. Minority groups chose him to write a letter explaining the boycott to Greenberg and Chambers. Law School Dean James Vorenberg sent a copy of that letter, along with a draft containing his own anti-boycott stance, to law students. The national media quoted from it in articles about the boycott, most of which criticized the boycotting student for what one columnist called "banal ethnocentrism."

Kenyatta was angry about what he saw as indifference to minority concerns at the Law School and had reservations about the teachers that "represent civil rights strategies from the 1950s".

Kenyatta thought the affirmative action controversy at the Law School was only a part of a national problem. He felt economic issues were the most important concern for Blacks in America at the time and that affirmative action was "a key concept" to help Blacks escape poverty.

=== Philadelphia mayoral run ===
Kenyatta ran for the Democratic nomination for Mayor of Philadelphia in 1975. At the time, Frank L. Rizzo—whom Kenyatta called "the George Wallace of the North"—was up for reelection and being challenged by a white liberal state senator, Louis G. Hill, for the party's nomination. Hill was counting on support from the city's Black population to beat Rizzo.

Kenyatta did not support Hill and ran for the Democratic nomination himself. The Philadelphia media paid a great deal of attention to his candidacy, in part because he had just completed a highly publicized citizens' campaign against the Black Mafia drug ring in the city. Although Kenyatta said he entered the race because he did not think Hill was any better than Rizzo, critics have accused him of deliberately splitting the Black vote so Rizzo would win. Kenyatta denied that he made any deals with Rizzo in exchange for his protest candidacy, however the charges of collusion were supported by the fact that two of his close friends were appointed patronage positions in the Rizzo administration.

=== International work ===
Kenyatta was vice chairman of the Pan African Skills Project, an international education program including the United States, Tanzania and Ghana and was a permanent representative to the United Nations nongovernmental organizations section. He helped to organize the Western New York Chapter of TransAfrica, a Washington-based lobbying group for African and Caribbean interests.

== Death ==
Kenyatta was a visiting professor at the University at Buffalo School of Law from 1988 until his death on January 3, 1992, at age 47. He had long been in ill health, said university officials, who added that the professor had suffered complications from diabetes and was hospitalized at the time of his death.

== Personal life ==
Kenyatta was survived by his wife, Mary Kenyatta of Buffalo and a daughter, Luana, of Buffalo. He had two sons, Malcolm, of Philadelphia, and Muhammad Santiago, of Virginia, three brothers and three sisters.

Kenyatta's grandson, Malcolm Kenyatta, is an active community and LGBT advocate in Philadelphia, and won election to District 181 of the Pennsylvania House of Representatives in 2018, and is a Vice Chair of the Democratic National Committee. He was a candidate in the 2022 Democratic primary for Pennsylvania's U.S. Senate seat vacated by retiring U.S. Senator Pat Toomey.
