= William Dwyer =

William Dwyer may refer to:

- William Dwyer (Irish politician) (1887–1951), Irish independent politician
- Bill Dwyer (mobster) (1883–1946), American Prohibition-era gangster
- Bil Dwyer (1907–1987), American cartoonist and humorist
- William Lee Dwyer (1929–2002), U.S. federal judge
- Ubi Dwyer (Bill Dwyer, 1933–2001), Windsor Free Festival organiser
- Bil Dwyer (born 1962), American actor and comedian
- William A. Dwyer Jr. (1914–1982), American lawyer, judge, and politician from Philadelphia
- William Gerard Dwyer (born 1947), American mathematician
- Bill Dwyer (sprinter) (born 1929), winner of the 60 yards at the 1949 USA Indoor Track and Field Championships
- Bill Dwyer (1887–1943), English comedian in the double act Clapham and Dwyer
