= Leonard G. Carr =

Carr in 1976

Leonard George Carr (October 25, 1902 – June 17, 1976) was a Baptist minister from Philadelphia and the founder and pastor of Vine Memorial Baptist Church.

== Biography ==
Born to an African American family in Charlottesville, Virginia, Carr was the son and grandson of ministers. In 1917, Carr and his family moved to Philadelphia, where he attended public schools and, later, Temple University. After Temple, Carr enrolled at Lincoln University and graduated with honors in 1933. In 1921, he married Lora Beatrice Brown. After her death, Carr remarried in 1952 to Juanita LaNina Matthews, with whom he had one daughter.

In 1932, while still a student at Lincoln, Carr was selected by a group of Baptists in West Philadelphia to become the pastor of what would soon become Vine Street Baptist Church. Carr's skill as a preacher soon became well-known, and in 1936 he was elected President of the Baptist Ministers' Conference for the Philadelphia region. In 1943, he was elected president of the Pennsylvania Baptist State Convention. Two years later, the church's growth led to the search for larger accommodations; they purchased the Palatinate Church at 56th & Girard Avenue and renamed it "Vine Memorial Baptist Church".

Under Carr's leadership, the church's growth continued after World War II. He set up a mission to Sierra Leone in 1950, called the Vine Memorial Baptist Training School. Carr continued his education, earning doctoral degrees from Lincoln in 1950 and from Virginia Seminary and College in 1953. By 1957, the church expanded again, constructing additional buildings at the 56th & Girard location. In 1960, Republicans nominated Carr for a seat on the Philadelphia City Council in a special election that year, but he was unsuccessful, losing to Democrat George X. Schwartz.

On June 17, 1976, while in his forty-fourth year as pastor of Vine Memorial, Carr died at Lankenau Medical Center in Wynnewood. After a service at his church, he was buried in Mount Lawn Cemetery in Delaware County, Pennsylvania.

== Sources ==
- "Pastor To Run For City Council". The Philadelphia Inquirer. September 9, 1960. p. 11 – via Newspapers.com.
- "Rev. Leonard Carr, of W. Phila". The Philadelphia Inquirer. June 22, 1976. p. 5-D – via Newspapers.com.
- "Founder's Biography". Vine Memorial Baptist Church. 2017.
- "Church History". Vine Memorial Baptist Church. 2017.
