= Malcolm Kenyatta =

American politician (born 1990)

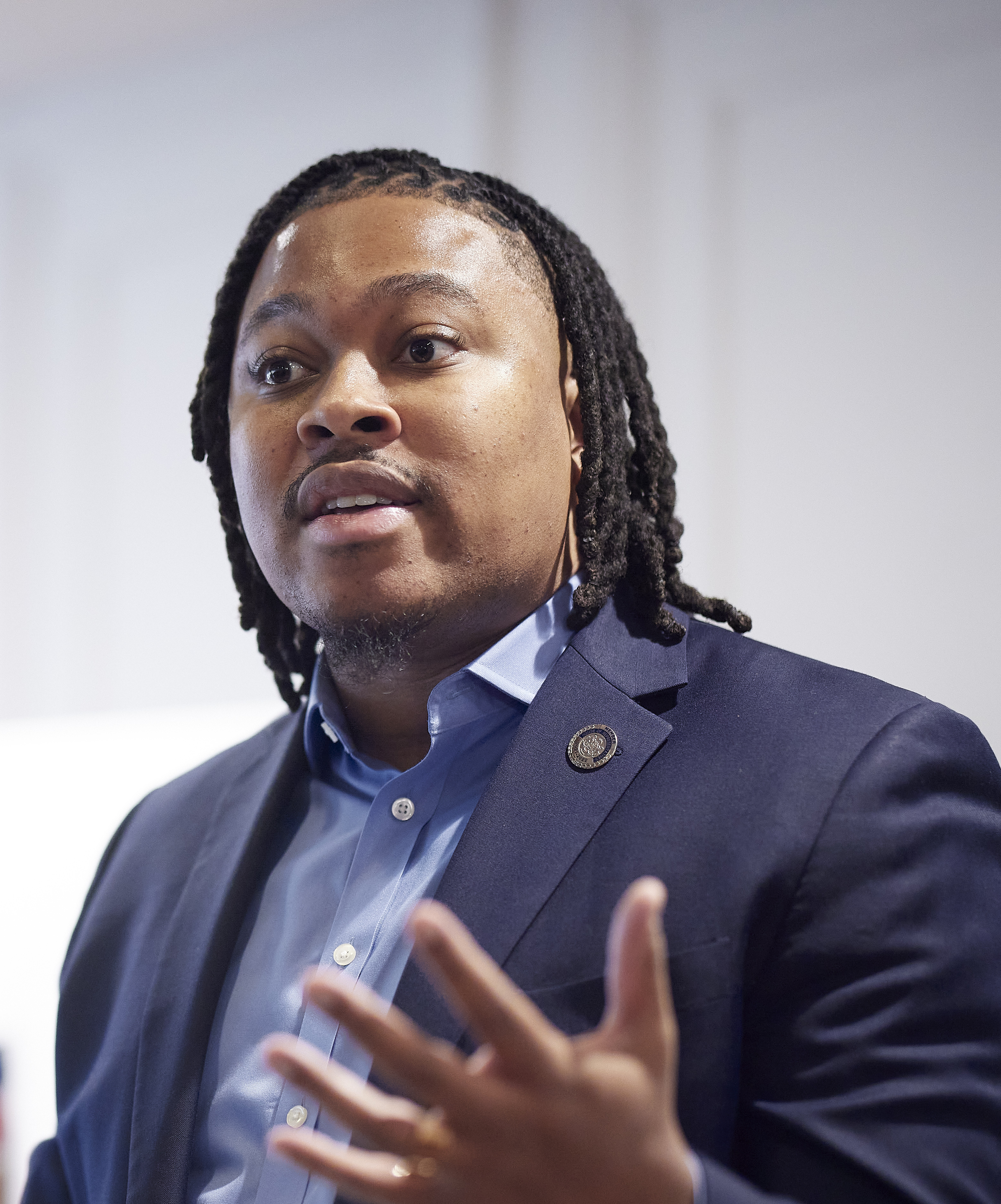
- Kenyatta in 2022

Vice Chair of the Democratic National Committee
- Incumbent
- Assumed office June 14, 2025 Serving with Reyna Walters-Morgan, Artie Blanco, and Jane Kleeb
- Chair: Ken Martin
- Preceded by: Various
- In office February 2, 2025 – June 11, 2025

Member of the Pennsylvania House of Representatives from the 181st district
- Incumbent
- Assumed office January 1, 2019
- Preceded by: Curtis Thomas

Personal details
- Born: July 30, 1990 (age 36) Philadelphia, Pennsylvania, U.S.
- Party: Democratic
- Spouse: Matt Miller
- Relatives: Muhammad Kenyatta (grandfather)
- Education: Temple University (BA); Drexel University (MS)
- Website: Official website

Malcolm Kenyatta (born July 30, 1990) is an American politician serving in the Pennsylvania House of Representatives, representing the 181st district since 2019. A member of the Democratic Party, he is from the North Philadelphia neighborhood of Philadelphia, Pennsylvania.

Kenyatta was the Democratic nominee for Pennsylvania Auditor General in 2024, losing to incumbent Republican Timothy DeFoor.

In 2025, he was elected vice chair of the Democratic National Committee. In June of the same year, he along with vice chair David Hogg were removed from their positions pending a new election, which Kenyatta won uncontested.

== Early life and education ==
Kenyatta was born to Kelly Kenyatta and Malcolm J. Kenyatta, at Temple University Hospital in North Central Philadelphia. He has three adopted siblings. Kenyatta is the grandson of the civil rights activist Muhammad I. Kenyatta.

Kenyatta earned a Bachelor of Arts degree in strategic communication from Temple University and a Master of Science in public communication from Drexel University. During college, Kenyatta organized student protests against proposed education budget cuts by then-Governor Tom Corbett.

During college, Kenyatta was also an avid poet and performer. In 2008, with the help of theater professor Kimmika Williams-Witherspoon, he founded the award-winning poetry collective Babel, which has twice won the College Unions Poetry Slam Invitational.

Kenyatta completed a Harvard Kennedy School of Government three-week executive education program, Senior Executives in State and Local Government, as a David Bohnett Fellow in 2019.

== Career ==
Kenyatta has been engaged in community affairs and politics since he was eleven years old, serving as the junior block captain with the Philadelphia Streets program.

Kenyatta has worked as a community activist, specifically around issues of poverty, which he has called "the moral and economic issue of our generation." He worked as a political consultant on multiple state and local races, most notably as the campaign manager for lawyer and activist Sherrie Cohen, the daughter of longtime city councilman David Cohen, in her 2015 bid for the Philadelphia City Council.

Kenyatta backed Joe Biden in the 2020 Democratic presidential primaries and has been critical of Bernie Sanders. He does not support an immediate transition to Medicare for All, noting that he would support interim bipartisan measures instead. Kenyatta supports abolishing the United States Senate filibuster.

In 2016 and 2020, he was elected as a delegate to the Democratic National Convention. He was selected as one of seventeen speakers to jointly deliver the keynote address at the 2020 Democratic National Convention. This made him, Sam Park, and Robert Garcia the first openly gay speakers in a keynote slot at a Democratic National Convention.

Kenyatta was one of 20 electors selected by the Pennsylvania Democratic Party to vote in the Electoral College for Joe Biden and his running mate Kamala Harris in 2020 United States presidential election.

In April 2023, Biden appointed Kenyatta as chair of the Presidential Advisory Commission on Advancing Educational Equity, Excellence and Economic Opportunity for Black Americans.

=== Pennsylvania House of Representatives ===
In December 2017, Kenyatta announced his campaign for the Pennsylvania House of Representatives to replace the long-serving incumbent Curtis Thomas. He won a five-way Democratic party primary election in May 2018 with 42.1% of the vote. The night of the election, unidentified people set up homophobic posters of him and his ex-husband throughout the district.

Kenyatta won the general election in November against Republican opponent Milton Street with 95.3% of the vote. The win made him one of the youngest elected state representatives in the Commonwealth of Pennsylvania and the first openly LGBTQ person of color elected to either chamber of the Pennsylvania General Assembly in the state's history.

Despite running in the 2022 Democratic primary for U.S. Senate, Kenyatta also remained on the primary ballot for re-election to 181st district, for which he ran unopposed in both the primary and general elections.

=== 2022 United States Senate campaign ===
On February 18, 2021, Kenyatta announced his bid for the United States Senate in the 2022 Democratic primary. He lost the Democratic nomination to Lieutenant Governor John Fetterman, winning only 10.9% of the vote and also losing his home county.

=== 2024 Auditor General campaign ===
On March 8, 2023, Kenyatta announced his candidacy to be Pennsylvania's Auditor General. Kenyatta was the first Democrat to announce a bid to challenge the incumbent Auditor General, Timothy DeFoor. He defeated Lehigh County Controller Mark Pinsley in the Democratic primary election. During the primary, Kenyatta faced criticism after he was caught on camera claiming Pinsley did not "like Black people." His victory made Kenyatta the first openly gay man nominated by any major party for any statewide office in Pennsylvania. Among his priorities, Kenyatta has stated that as auditor general he would create a bureau of worker safety and restart school audits that were transferred to the Department of Education by DeFoor. He was defeated by DeFoor in the general election.

=== Democratic National Committee (2025) ===
In January 2025, Kenyatta announced his intention to run for one of the three at-large vice chair positions within the Democratic National Committee. His stated goals in this position would be to increase Democratic voter registration and rebrand the national party. He also spoke for a need to support down ballot Democratic candidates. On February 1, Kenyatta was elected as a vice chair alongside gun control activist David Hogg and Nevada Democratic leader Artie Blanco. In June 2025, he along with Vice Chair David Hogg were removed from their positions pending a new election in which both would have to compete for the same seat. Hogg decided not to run again, which meant Kenyatta won the election uncontested.

== Personal life ==
Kenyatta and his husband Matt live in Philadelphia. The documentaries Going Forward (2018) and Kenyatta: Do Not Wait Your Turn (2023) were directed by Timothy Harris and are about him.

=== Recognition ===
In 2017, Kenyatta was named as one of Philadelphia magazine's 38 "people we love" as a "neighborhood champ."

Kenyatta was the subject of an award-winning documentary, Going Forward, which followed his 2018 victory.

The Philadelphia Tribune called Kenyatta one of Philadelphia's most influential African-Americans.

In 2020, Kenyatta was named an OUT 100 Honoree by OUT Magazine, their annual list of the most "impactful and influential LGBTQ+ people". In the same year, he was awarded the Sen. Tammy Baldwin Breakthrough Award.

On August 20, 2024, Kenyatta spoke at the Democratic National Convention.

== Electoral history ==
2018 Pennsylvania State Representative election for the 181st district, Democratic primary
Party	Candidate	Votes	%
Democratic	Malcolm Kenyatta	2,270	42.14
Democratic	Lewis Nash Sr.	1,435	26.64
Democratic	Lewis F. Thomas III	956	17.75
Democratic	Jason Alexander Deering	422	7.83
Democratic	Gilberto Gonzalez	304	5.64
Total votes		5,387	100

2018 Pennsylvania State Representative election for the 181st district
Party	Candidate	Votes	%	±%
Democratic	Malcolm Kenyatta	21,382	95.32	−4.68
Republican	Milton Street	1,050	4.68	+4.68
Total votes		22,432	100.0%	N/A
Democratic hold				

2020 Pennsylvania State Representative election for the 181st district, Democratic primary
Party	Candidate	Votes	%
Democratic	Malcolm Kenyatta (incumbent)	Unopposed	
Total votes		10,377	100

2020 Pennsylvania State Representative election for the 181st district
Party	Candidate	Votes	%
Democratic	Malcolm Kenyatta (incumbent)	Unopposed	
Total votes		25,258	100.0%
Democratic hold			

2022 United States Senate election in Pennsylvania, Democratic primary
Party	Candidate	Votes	%
Democratic	John Fetterman	753,557	58.65%
Democratic	Conor Lamb	337,498	26.27%
Democratic	Malcolm Kenyatta	139,393	10.85%
Democratic	Alexandria Khalil	54,460	4.24%
Total votes		1,284,908	100.00%

2024 Pennsylvania Auditor General election, Democratic primary
Party	Candidate	Votes	%
Democratic	Malcolm Kenyatta	655,687	64.54%
Democratic	Mark Pinsley	360,182	35.46%
Total votes		1,015,869	100.0%

2024 Pennsylvania Auditor General election
Party	Candidate	Votes	%	±%
Republican	Timothy DeFoor	3,489,296	51.13%	+1.73%
Democratic	Malcolm Kenyatta	3,134,631	45.94%	−0.36%
Libertarian	Reece Smith	122,975	1.80%	−1.25%
Constitution	Bob Goodrich	55,956	0.82%	0%
American Solidarity	Eric K Anton	20,976	0.31%	0%
Total votes		6,824,454	100.0%	
Republican hold				

== See also ==
- List of African-American United States Senate candidates

Party political offices
Preceded by Elizabeth Warren	Keynote Speaker of the Democratic National Convention; 2020; Served alongside: Stacey Abrams, Raumesh Akbari, Colin Allred, Brendan Boyle, Yvanna Cancela, Kathleen Clyde, Nikki Fried, Robert Garcia, Marlon Kimpson, Conor Lamb, Mari Manoogian, Victoria Neave, Jonathan Nez, Sam Park, Denny Ruprecht, Randall Woodfin	Next: Angela Alsobrooks
Preceded by Nina Ahmad	Democratic nominee for Auditor of Pennsylvania; 2024	Most recent
