= Alphonso Deal =

American politician

Member of the Pennsylvania House of Representatives from the 181st district
- In office January 6, 1981 – June 3, 1987
- Preceded by: Milton Street
- Succeeded by: Shirley Kitchen

Personal details
- Born: April 15, 1923
- Died: June 3, 1987 (aged 64)
- Party: Democratic

Alphonso Deal (April 15, 1923 – June 3, 1987) was an American politician and civil rights activist; as a Democratic member of the Pennsylvania House of Representatives and president of the North Philadelphia "Action" Branch of the NAACP.
