= Ann J. Land =

Member of the Philadelphia City Council from the 4th District
- In office October 30, 1980 – January 7, 1992
- Preceded by: George Schwartz
- Succeeded by: Michael Nutter

Personal details
- Born: April 12, 1932 Philadelphia, Pennsylvania
- Died: March 9, 2010 (aged 77) Sea Isle City, New Jersey
- Party: Democratic
- Spouse: John Land
- Profession: Politician, Librarian, Community-relations Specialist

Ann J. Chambers Land (March 12, 1932 – March 9, 2010) was a member of the Philadelphia City Council and a member of the Democratic Party.

== Early life ==
Land was a native of North Philadelphia, where she attended John W. Hallahan Catholic Girls High School. After graduating from high school in 1950, she was an office worker, and later became a librarian at the Pennsylvania Senate.

== Political involvement ==
She was an active campaigner for John F. Kennedy, and later became a member of the Philadelphia's Democratic Committee. In the late 1970s, she was elected leader of the 38th Ward.

=== City council ===
In 1980, she won a special election to the Philadelphia City Council, after incumbent George Schwartz resigned in the wake of the Abscam scandal. She was re-elected 1983, and in 1987, she won a second full-term by defeating challenger Michael Nutter.

=== Defeat and later life ===
In 1991, Nutter again challenged Land, and this time was successful. Nutter would go on to wage a successful campaign for Mayor in 2007.

After her defeat, Land was a community-relations specialist with Philadelphia Gas Works.

== Personal life ==
Land married her husband, John, in 1954. He was a beverage distributor with a business in West Philadelphia. The couple had five children.

She died of chronic obstructive pulmonary disease in March 2010 at her home in Sea Isle City, New Jersey.
