= Herbert Arlene =

American politician

Member of the Pennsylvania Senate from the 3rd district
- In office January 2, 1967 – November 30, 1980
- Preceded by: Louis Johanson
- Succeeded by: Milton Street

Member of the Pennsylvania House of Representatives from the Philadelphia County district
- In office January 6, 1959 – November 30, 1966

Personal details
- Born: September 5, 1914 Harrison, Georgia
- Died: November 9, 1989 (aged 75) Philadelphia, Pennsylvania
- Party: Democratic

Herbert Arlene (September 5, 1914 – November 9, 1989) was an American politician from Pennsylvania who served as a Democratic member of the Pennsylvania State Senate for the 3rd district from 1967 until 1980. He was the first African-American elected to the Pennsylvania Senate. He also served in the Pennsylvania House of Representatives for the Philadelphia County district from 1959 to 1966.

== Early life ==
Arlene was born in Harrison, Georgia to Elbert and Mattie King Arlene. He graduated from the Philadelphia public schools, Philadelphia Business College and received an honorary L.L.D. from Miller College.

== Career ==
He was the owner of Arlene's Tailor Shop and a member of the board of trustees of Lincoln University, the board of directors of the Greater Philadelphia Development Corporation, the Bearean Institute, Hospital Authority of Philadelphia. He served as Ward Leader for the 47th Ward in Philadelphia and as a member of the Pennsylvania House of Representatives from 1956 to 1966 and as a member of the Pennsylvania State Senate for the 3rd district from 1967 to 1980.

He died in Philadelphia, Pennsylvania and is interred at the Rolling Green Cemetery in West Chester, Pennsylvania.
