= Roxanne Jones =

American social activist and politician (1928–1996)

Member of the Pennsylvania Senate from the 3rd district
- In office January 1, 1985 – May 19, 1996
- Preceded by: Milton Street
- Succeeded by: Shirley Kitchen

Personal details
- Born: Roxanne Harper; May 3, 1928 South Carolina, United States
- Died: May 19, 1996 (aged 68) Philadelphia, Pennsylvania, United States
- Party: Democratic
- Parent(s): Gilford Harper and Mary Beatrice Burton Harper
- Occupation: Social justice activist and state legislator
- Known for: The first African-American woman to serve in the Pennsylvania State Senate

Roxanne H. Jones (May 3, 1928 – May 19, 1996) was an American social activist and politician who served as a Democratic member of the Pennsylvania State Senate for the 3rd district from January 1, 1985 to May 19, 1996.

She was the first African-American woman to serve in the Pennsylvania State Senate and the second woman to serve in the Senate since Flora M. Vare in 1928.

In 1996, she was described by the Philadelphia Daily News as someone who, [i]n an era of despair ... always saw hope—never defeat." Ed Rendell, the mayor of Philadelphia at that time and later governor of Pennsylvania, called her the city's "leading advocate for the poor and most vulnerable citizens ... a non-stop energetic whirlwind who battled injustice with every ounce of energy she possessed."

== Early life ==
Born in South Carolina on May 3, 1928 to Gilford and Mary Beatrice Bruton Harper, Roxanne Harper was educated at Edward High School. She had to rely on welfare support as a young, single mother raising two children on a waitress salary.

== Career ==
Jones worked with the Philadelphia Opportunities Industrialization Center and then served as chair of the Southwark public housing chapter of the Philadelphia Welfare Rights Organization from 1967 to 1968. She registered voters, worked to improve educational services for children who were enrolled in the city's schools, and pushed elected officials to ban the use of lead-based paint due to the damage it caused to children's developing brains.

She founded Philadelphia Citizens in Action, was a board member of the Pennsylvania Minority Business Development Authority, and was a member of the Martin Luther King Center of Social Change and the National Congress of Black Women.

In 1983, she was one of the leaders of a march on the Pennsylvania Capitol, which turned into a "13-day occupation of the Capitol Rotunda to protest the denial of year-round cash assistance" to 80,000 Pennsylvania residents who were "considered able-bodied."

Elected to the Pennsylvania State Senate, District 3, after defeating Senator Milton Street in November 1984, Jones served from 1985 until her death in office in 1996. During the last month of her life, she proposed the creation of a nineteen-member advisory panel to investigate ways to improve the lives of children whose parents were imprisoned, new legislation that would reduce Medicaid fraud by requiring that the government improve reviews of medical claims and send Medicaid recipients medical statements to help them keep better track of what was happening with their care, and legislation that would require the government to reimburse families receiving welfare assistance for bus fares to ensure that they could continue to send their children to school.

== Final fight, illness and death ==
In 1996, Jones "was taking medication for high blood pressure and other coronary artery disease" and "occasionally required hospital visits for exhaustion or additional treatment for her blood pressure," according to the Philadelphia Daily News, which reported that increased stress at work in May of that year likely exacerbated her health issues. Jones had been engaged in a fight to prevent the passage of S.B. 1441, a welfare reform bill that would drop "220,000 poor people from medical aid unless they [found] at least 100 hours of work each month." When the law was passed, she then fought to convince Pennsylvania Governor Tom Ridge to veto it, but was unsuccessful. One of her closest friends, Geneva Dickerson, described the impact of the loss on Jones:

"She was devastated. She was hurt because she knew that bill would hurt a lot of poor people, people in great need of medical assistance. A part of her died when that bill passed. It killed her.... It took something out of her. She felt helpless."

On Saturday evening, May 18, 1996, Jones experienced chest pains and sought medical care at St. Joseph's Hospital, but doctors were unable to diagnose a cause for the pain and she was allowed to return home. At 8 a.m. on Sunday morning, May 19, Jones sought medical care again at St. Joseph's Hospital, this time for stomach and chest pains. While she was being treated, she suffered a heart attack, went into cardiac arrest, and died at 10:18 a.m. Alva Smith, M.D., a St. Joseph's cardiologist, "said the combination of her age, medical history and stress of the welfare fight 'unquestionably' caused her heart attack," according to the Philadelphia Daily News. "'There are studies to support stress as a precipitator of heart attack.... Against the background of coronary artery disease, the added stress of what happened definitely could cause a heart attack." Jones' former chief of staff, Charmaine Matlock-Turner, later said that many who knew Jones personally "'thought that Ridge's signing that bill had a lot to do with her dying. Her whole family knew how upset she was about the bill."

In the days following her death, newspapers described Jones' "righteous fire" and "pioneering courage," and called her "an unwavering champion of the poor."

Among her colleagues, Senator Bob Mellow, the Democratic leader in the Pennsylvania State Senate, observed, "You can only succeed Sen. Jones, you cannot replace her.... You cannot replace the voice we lost in this Senate." The head of Philadelphia's Housing Authority, John F. White Jr., observed, "It's another stilled voice for the most disadvantaged and vulnerable citizens of our state," while her friend and colleague of two decades, Jonathan Stein, of Community Legal Services, explained that:

"Her work was not about potholes and getting drivers' licenses expedited.... It was whether children would survive with decent health care, clothing and shelter. She took all these life-and-death issues to heart. It was her heart that let out finally."

Although Ridge was initially asked to stay away from Jones' funeral, family members subsequently extended an invitation for him to attend.

== Memorial services ==
An eight-hour wake was held for Jones at the United House of Prayer for All People at 12th and Poplar streets in Philadelphia on May 29, 1996, followed by a Community Tribute that was attended by roughly four hundred people that evening. Rendell, Pennsylvania Rep. Dwight Evans and U.S. Rep. William H. Gray III were among the roughly forty speakers who eulogized Jones during the evening memorial service.

== Legacy ==
One of Jones' final acts before her death was to respond to a child's request for a personally autographed picture. Praising Kimberly Kieffer, a nine-year-old who had proposed a ban on smoking for children under the age of fourteen as part of a fourth-grade mock legislative session at North Hills Elementary School in York, Pennsylvania, a school that was not even in Jones' legislative district, Jones not only sent the child the requested picture, the final one that she would ever autograph, but she also took the time to write Kieffer a handwritten note:

"I think you are great. I know your parents think so too. Keep it up."

In the days and years after Jones' death, educators, elected officials, social justice activists, and their respective organizations continued to pay tribute to her public service and the inspiration she gave to others. Former Philadelphia Mayor Wilson Goode said:

"When others gave up, Roxanne continued to fight.... When others thought the fight was hopeless, Roxanne saw hope. She became that relentless voice in Harrisburg—sometimes a voice in the wilderness."

On November 29, 1999, the United States Congress designated the U.S. Post Office at 2601 North 16th Street in Philadelphia as the "Roxanne H. Jones Post Office Building."

A mural of Jones was created on a building on Broad Street in North Philadelphia in her honor.
