= Milton Street =

American businessman and politician (1941–2022)

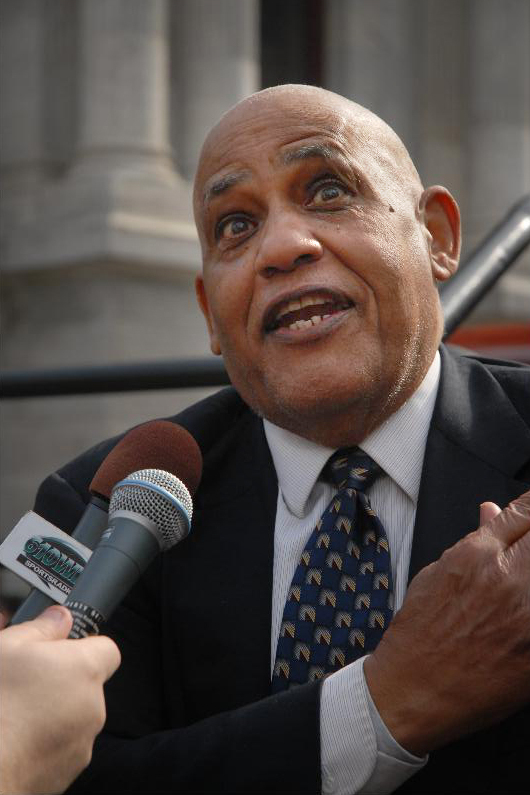
- Street in 2007

Member of the Pennsylvania Senate from the 3rd district
- In office January 6, 1981 – November 30, 1984
- Preceded by: Herbert Arlene
- Succeeded by: Roxanne Jones

Member of the Pennsylvania House of Representatives from the 181st district
- In office January 2, 1979 – November 30, 1980
- Preceded by: Ulysses Shelton
- Succeeded by: Alphonso Deal

Personal details
- Born: Thomas Milton Street; April 25, 1939 Norristown, Pennsylvania, U.S.
- Died: November 28, 2022 (aged 83)
- Relatives: John F. Street (brother), Sharif Street (nephew)
- Education: Oakwood College; Temple University

Thomas Milton Street Sr. (April 25, 1939 – November 28, 2022) was an American businessman, a Pennsylvania state senator from Philadelphia, and the brother of former Philadelphia mayor John F. Street. Originally a street hot dog vendor, he rose to prominence as an activist challenging the city's vending and housing ordinances.

== Early life and career before politics ==
Street was born on April 25, 1939, the middle of three brothers. He grew up on a farm near Swedeland in Montgomery County, outside Philadelphia, in a strict family of Seventh-day Adventists. He attended Oakwood College and Temple University, and was owner of Street Food Concessions prior to entering politics.

== Political career ==
=== State legislature ===
Street was elected to the 181st District of the Pennsylvania House of Representatives as a Democrat in 1978, and to the Pennsylvania State Senate as a Democrat in 1980. However, shortly after his election, he switched parties to Republican in order to give the Republicans control of the State Senate. He was rewarded with a committee chairmanship and a finer office that was previously State Senator Vince Fumo's. He was an unsuccessful candidate for Congress against incumbent Representative Bill Gray in 1982, and an unsuccessful Democratic candidate for re-election as State Senator in 1984.

=== 2007 Mayoral candidacy ===
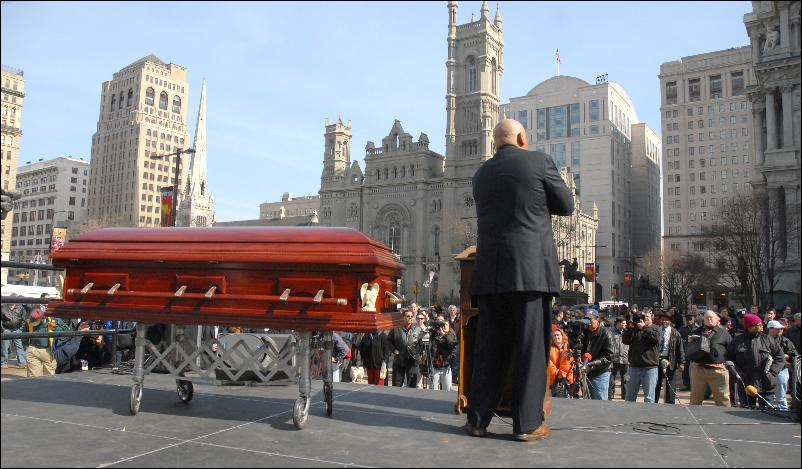

Street declared his candidacy in the 2007 Philadelphia mayoral election, while awaiting trial on federal tax charges. His candidacy was denounced by many, including eventual Mayor Michael Nutter, who called Street's candidacy a distraction from important issues. Street was later arrested on February 19 in New Jersey for failure to pay multiple traffic tickets, though he asserted upon release that his campaign would continue.

Street had announced that if 5,000 people did not attend a noontime rally at City Hall plaza on March 1, 2007, he would give up his candidacy for mayor. Media reports placed attendance at about 200, many of those curious passersby. Street was undeterred, saying he "underestimated" his passion and vowed to continue in the race, not wanting it to be considered a "publicity stunt."

=== 2007 City Council candidacy ===
Five days later Street withdrew, announcing his intention to run for one of the five Democratic at-large council seats on the last day to file nominating petitions. This would place him in contention with his nephew, Sharif Street, son of the former mayor of Philadelphia. Street himself pointed out that the city residency requirement for a council candidate is one year instead of the three years for a mayoral candidate. There has been some question as to where Street officially resided, in Philadelphia or Moorestown, New Jersey. On March 12, 2007, Street's petition was challenged in court by a voter, since Street turned in only 894 validated signatures into City Hall and the requirement to be placed on the Democratic Primary ballot is 1,000. He did get on the ballot and was unsuccessful in his bid, finishing 17th of 19 candidates (for five spots) with 1.47% of the vote.

=== 2011 Mayoral candidacy ===
Street was once again running for mayor in the 2011 election. He challenged incumbent mayor Michael Nutter in the Democratic primary, and lost, accumulating 24.07% of the primary vote.

=== 2015 Mayoral candidacy ===
On March 10, 2015, Street filed as a Democratic candidate for mayor of Philadelphia. As with previous years, violence prevention was a central theme of his campaign. He received 1.68 percent of the vote, finishing last in 6th place.

Shortly after his failed campaign, Street announced a proposal to train 5,000 residents in martial arts to support law enforcement.

=== 2018 State House campaign ===
Street ran for his old seat in the 181st Pennsylvania House district as the Republican nominee. He received 4.66% of the vote, losing to Democrat Malcolm Kenyatta.

=== 2019 Mayoral candidacy ===
On May 15, 2019, Street announced his candidacy in the 2019 mayoral election. Having announced too late to run on either party's ticket, he ran an independent write-in campaign. He had until August 1, 2019 to submit the necessary paperwork and petition with the required signatures.

== Business ventures ==
Street later returned to prominence during the 1990s through his many business ventures, including a local amphibious tour bus company and vending and consulting contracts with the city and Philadelphia International Airport.

=== Trial and conviction ===
In November 2006, Street was indicated on federal charges of wire fraud, mail fraud, and tax offenses. The fraud charges arose from Street's involvement with Philadelphia Airport Services, a joint venture established to seek a maintenance contract at Philadelphia International Airport and Northeast Philadelphia Airport; federal prosecutors alleged that the airport contacting company hired Street and paid him $2 million worth of consulting fees and income for which Street did little or no work, and for which he did not report income on his tax returns or pay tax.

During his trial, Street claimed that the federal income tax on wages is illegal and the Internal Revenue Service had no authority to collect taxes, a common tax protestor argument universally rejected by the courts.

On February 22, 2008, a jury convicted Street of three counts of failure to file tax returns for years 2002, 2003, and 2004. The crimes were misdemeanors. He was acquitted on four counts of mail and wire fraud; and the jury deadlocked on two charges that Milton had filed false returns in 2000 and 2001. A co-defendant, John H. Velardi Sr., was acquitted.

In September 2008, U.S. District Judge Legrome D. Davis sentenced Street to 30 months in prison; during the hearing, Judge Davis said that Street's conduct in failing to file returns or pay tax on almost $3 million in income was "outrageous" and also ordered Street to pay $413,000 in back taxes. Street appealed, but his conviction was affirmed by the Third Circuit Court of Appeals. Street served 26 months in prison.

== Death ==
Street died on November 28, 2022, after a battle with prostate cancer.
