= Shirley Kitchen =

American politician (1946–2026)

Shirley M. Kitchen

Member of the Pennsylvania Senate from the 3rd district
- In office November 18, 1996 – November 30, 2016
- Preceded by: Roxanne Jones
- Succeeded by: Sharif Street

Member of the Pennsylvania House of Representatives from the 181st district
- In office November 17, 1987 – November 30, 1988
- Preceded by: Alphonso Deal
- Succeeded by: W. Curtis Thomas

Personal details
- Born: September 18, 1946 Augusta, Georgia, U.S.
- Died: July 2026 (aged 79)
- Party: Democratic
- Spouse: Divorced
- Education: Temple University, Antioch University

Shirley M. Kitchen (September 18, 1946 – July 2026) was an American politician from Pennsylvania who served as a Democratic member of the Pennsylvania House of Representatives for the 181st district from 1987 through 1988 and the Pennsylvania State Senate for the 3rd District from 1996 to 2016. She was the second African-American woman to serve in the Pennsylvania Senate.

== Early life and education ==
Kitchen was born in Augusta, Georgia, on September 18, 1946. She graduated from Antioch University in 1979 with a bachelor's degree in Human Services and attended Temple University. She received certificates in Child Care, Behavior Modification and Economic Development from Temple.

== Career ==
Kitchen worked as a poll worker in the City of Philadelphia from 1970 to 1976, as a social worker for the County of Philadelphia and as the Director of Constituent Services for the Philadelphia City Council from 1986 to 1987.

She was elected to the Pennsylvania House of Representatives, District 181 in November 1987 and served through 1988. She was elected to the Pennsylvania State Senate for the 3rd district in November 1996 in a special election to succeed Roxanne Jones who had died in office. She served until November 2016 when she retired from the Pennsylvania State Senate. She was the second African-American woman to serve in the Pennsylvania State Senate at the time of her retirement, and was the only African-American woman member of the Senate.

Kitchen worked as the Manager for the Management Information Systems Department of the Philadelphia Parking Authority from 1990 to 1992 and as Director of Constituent Services for the Philadelphia City Council from 1992 to 1996.

== Ward leader ==
Kitchen was the Ward Leader of the 20th Ward Democratic Executive Committee.

== 2015 legislative action ==
Throughout 2015, she worked in the following committees:

- Public Health and Welfare
- Agricultural and Rural Affairs
- Transportation
- Urban Affairs and Housing

== Death ==
Kitchen's death at the age of 79 was announced on July 5, 2026.
