= Curtis Thomas =

American politician (born 1948)

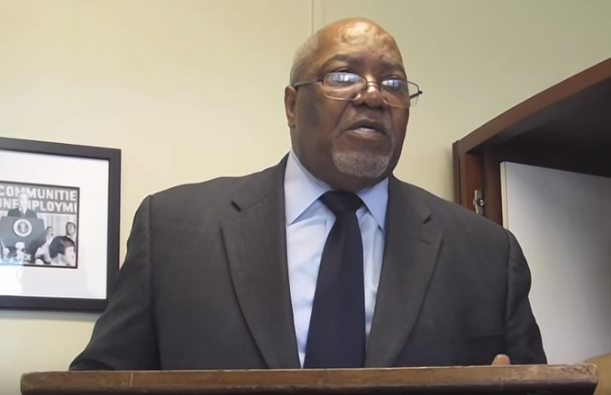
- Thomas in 2015

Member of the Pennsylvania House of Representatives from the 181st district
- In office January 3, 1989 – November 30, 2018
- Preceded by: Shirley Kitchen
- Succeeded by: Malcolm Kenyatta

Personal details
- Born: 1948 (age 77–78) Philadelphia, Pennsylvania, U.S.
- Party: Democratic
- Education: Temple University; Antioch School of Law
- Occupation: teacher attorney

W. Curtis Thomas is an American former politician who served as a Democratic Party member of the Pennsylvania House of Representatives, District 181.
