= John J. Duffy Jr. =

American lawyer

- Born: John James Duffy Jr. February 3, 1933; West Philadelphia, Pennsylvania
- Died: February 1, 2019 (aged 85); Downingtown, Pennsylvania
- Education: Villanova University School of Law
- Occupation: Criminal defense attorney
- Spouses: Bridget Cotter (m. 1953; div. 1984); Marie DelVecchio (m. 1986–2019)
- Children: 7

John J. Duffy Jr. (February 3, 1933 - February 1, 2019) was an American criminal defense trial attorney.

== Early life ==
Duffy was born in West Philadelphia on February 3, 1933, and proceeding to graduate from La Salle University and Villanova University School of Law. He served in the Air Force during the Korean War.

In 1960, Duffy began to practice law in West Chester.

== Notable cases ==
Duffy played a role in the 1980 ABSCAM scandal, in which numerous elected officials were targeted in an FBI sting operation, with agents posing as Arab businessmen offering bribes. Duffy was the lead defense attorney for Louis C. Johanson, a member of the Philadelphia City Council who was sentenced to three years in prison.

In 1981, Duffy defended one of the Maragos brothers who, along with four others, were accused of fixing the Pennsylvania lottery's daily number. The event was known as the Triple Six Fix, because the winning number was 6–6–6. All of the Maragos brothers avoided jail time by agreeing to testify against the accused mastermind of the scam, Nick Perry.

In 1991 Duffy began a 10-year defense of Andrew Byrne, who was accused of killing his wife. Byrne's conviction was twice overturned, and in 2001 Duffy secured a plea bargain for his client.

== Recovering alcoholics ==
In 2009, Duffy was given the Osceola Wesley award by Chester County Drug Court his contributions to the "recovery of people gripped by addictive demons".

== Death ==
Duffy died on February 1, 2019, at the age of 85 following several months of ill health.
