= Ulysses Shelton =

American politician

Member of the Pennsylvania House of Representatives from the 181st district
- In office January 7, 1969 – May 23, 1978
- Preceded by: District created
- Succeeded by: Milton Street

Member of the Pennsylvania House of Representatives from the Philadelphia County district
- In office 1961–1968

Personal details
- Born: July 1, 1917 St. Petersburg, Florida
- Died: June 14, 1981 (aged 63) Philadelphia, Pennsylvania
- Party: Democratic
- Spouse: Pearl A. Daniels (m. 1947)
- Children: Charles, Frederick Grandchildren = Charles Jr, Andre, Andrew, Andrea,Antoine Mosby
- Education: Mastbaum Vocational School

Military service
- Branch/service: United States Air Force

Ulysses Shelton (July 1, 1917 – June 13, 1981) was an American Democratic politician who served as a member of the Pennsylvania House of Representatives from 1969 to 1978. He was born in Florida to Wright and Leila Arline Shelton. He died in June 1981 at the age of 63. The House passed a memorial resolution in honor of him in 1983. He lived in Philadelphia.
