= Pennsylvania's 3rd Senate district =

American legislative district

Pennsylvania's 3rd State Senate district
Senator
Sharif Street; D–Philadelphia
- Population (2021): 263,993

Pennsylvania State Senate District 3 includes part of Philadelphia County. It is currently represented by Democrat Sharif Street.

== District profile ==
The district includes the following areas:

Philadelphia County:

- Ward 11
- Ward 13
- Ward 14
- Ward 15
- Ward 16
- Ward 20
- Ward 29
- Ward 32
- Ward 35 [PART, Divisions 09, 10, 11, 13, 18, 19, 20, 21, 25, 27, 28, 29, 30 and 31]
- Ward 37
- Ward 42
- Ward 43
- Ward 47
- Ward 49
- Ward 61

== Senators ==
Representative	Party	Years	District home	Note
Cyrus Cadwallader	Federalist	1817 – 1823		
Joel Keith Mann	Jackson Democrat	1823 – 1825		U.S. Representative for Pennsylvania's 5th congressional district from 1831 to 1835
Benjamin Reiff	National Republican	1827 – 1831		
John Matheys	Democratic	1831 – 1833		
James Holdsworth Paull	Anti-Mason, Whig	1835 – 1839		
Francis James	Anti-Mason	1837 – 1839		
Henry Myers	Democratic	1837 – 1839		
Thomas S. Bell	Democratic	1837 – 1841		
Nathaniel Brooke	Whig	1839 – 1841		
John Benton Sterigere	Whig	1839 – 1843		U.S. Representative for Pennsylvania's 5th congressional district from 1827 to 1831
John T. Huddleston	Whig	1841 – 1842		
Abraham Brower	Whig	1841 – 1843		
George Richards	Whig	1847 – 1848		
Joshua Y. Jones	Democratic	1851 – 1853		
Benjamin Wick	Whig	1853 – 1854		
Thomas Pope Knox	Democratic	1855 – 1857		
John Thompson	Whig	1859 – 1861		
John Christman Smith	Democratic	1861 – 1863		
Cornelius M. Donovan	Democratic	1865 – 1867		
David A. Nagle	Democratic	1869 – 1875		
Henry S. Evans	Whig	1871 – 1873		
John Lamon	Republican	1873 – 1879		
James Gay Gordon	Democratic	1881 – 1883		
Francis Augustus Osbourne	Republican	1887 – 1901		
Charles P. Devlin	Democratic	1889 – 1890		
William H. Keyser	Republican	1901 – 1911		
James P. McNichol	Democratic	1907 – 1915		Pennsylvania State Senator for the 7th district from 1905 to 1906
William J. McNichol	Republican	1919 – 1925		
William Cosgrove Hunsicker	Republican	1927 – 1935		
Jerome H. Jaspan	Democratic	1937 – 1947		
John R. Meade	Republican	1949 – 1951		
Peter J. Camiel	Democratic	1953 – 1964		
Louis C. Johanson	Democratic	1965 – 1966		Convicted for bribery and conspiracy as part of the Abscam sting operation. Served three years in prison and fined $20,000.
Herbert Arlene	Democratic	1967 – 1980		First African-American to serve in the Pennsylvania Senate.
T. Milton Street	Republican	1981 – 1984		
Roxanne Jones	Democratic	1985 – 1996		First African-American woman to serve in the Pennsylvania Senate.
Shirley M. Kitchen	Democratic	1996 – 2017		Pennsylvania State Representative for the 181st district from 1987 to 1988
Sharif Street	Democratic	2017 – present		
