= Sharif Street =

American politician from Pennsylvania

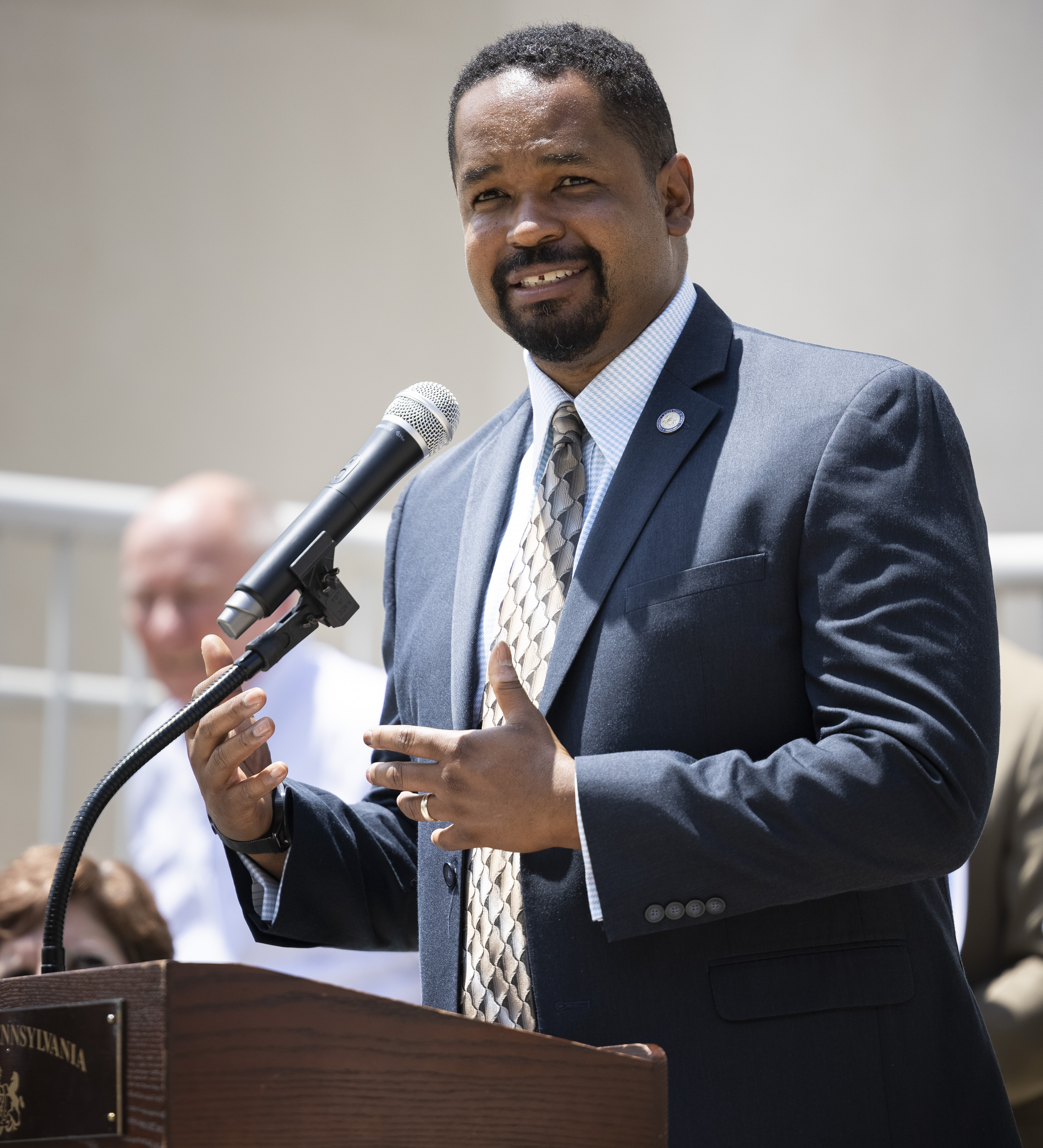
- Street in 2021

Chair of the Pennsylvania Democratic Party
- In office June 18, 2022 – September 6, 2025
- Preceded by: Nancy Patton Mills
- Succeeded by: Eugene DePasquale

Member of the Pennsylvania Senate from the 3rd district
- Incumbent
- Assumed office January 3, 2017
- Preceded by: Shirley Kitchen

Personal details
- Born: March 29, 1974 (age 52) Philadelphia, Pennsylvania, U.S.
- Party: Democratic
- Relatives: John F. Street (father); Milton Street (uncle)
- Education: Morehouse College (BA); University of Pennsylvania (JD)

Sharif Street (born March 29, 1974) is an American politician and attorney. He is a Democratic member of the Pennsylvania State Senate who has represented the 3rd district since 2017. Street served as vice-chair of the Pennsylvania Democratic Party from 2018 to 2022, and party chair from 2022 to 2025.

== Early life and education ==
Born and raised in North Philadelphia, Street is the son of former Philadelphia mayor John F. Street, and the nephew of former state senator Milton Street. His mother Helen Street was a teacher at Sheridan Elementary in Kensington. Street graduated from Central High School, where he was the student body president and ran track and field. He attended Morehouse College, serving as president of the student senate. After earning a Bachelor of Arts in business administration with a concentration in finance, he received his Juris Doctor from the University of Pennsylvania School of Law in 1999. During law school, he was the president of the Penn Law Democrats.

== Early political involvement ==
Throughout the early 2000s, Street was known for his cultural pride and long locks, which he kept even while campaigning. During the 2000 presidential election, Street was a Pennsylvania state co-chair of GoreNet. GoreNet was a group that supported the Al Gore campaign with a focus on grassroots and online organizing, as well as hosting small-dollar donor events. In 2004, Street was elected as a delegate to the Democratic National Convention committed to John Kerry for President.

== Career ==
=== Pennsylvania State Senate ===
Street was elected to the State Senate in 2016, becoming the first Muslim elected to the body. He currently serves as a member of the Pennsylvania Commission on Sentencing and the Joint Legislative Air and Water Pollution Control and Conservation Committee.

In 2021, The Philadelphia Inquirer reported that Street was working for months with Republicans on a redistricting plan that would boost his own prospective congressional campaign. A spokesperson for U.S. representative Brendan Boyle alleged that Street was "conspiring with Republicans to push a gerrymandered Republican map for personal political gain." U.S. representative Madeleine Dean urged Governor Tom Wolf to veto "the reported gerrymandered congressional maps." J.J. Balaban, a Philadelphia-based Democratic consultant who worked on U.S. House races said "[a]ny Democratic elected official should be embarrassed to support a map as bad for Democrats as that map is." The map, which did not pass, would have created an incumbent-free district in Philadelphia where Street could have run.

In September 2023, Street voted against Senate Bill 773 in committee, which would allow all of the state’s medical marijuana growers and processors to sell their products directly to patients. The bill passed. However, Street voted affirmatively when the bill made it in the full chamber.

==== Committee assignments ====
For the 2025–2026 session, Street sits on the following committees:

- Banking & Insurance (Minority Chair)
- Agriculture & Rural Affairs
- Appropriations
- Health & Human Services
- Urban Affairs & Housing

=== Pennsylvania Democratic Party ===
In 2022, Street was elected Chair of the Pennsylvania Democratic Party after serving as vice-chair to Chairwoman Nancy Patton Mills of Allegheny County. Governor Josh Shapiro did not support Street's candidacy for the role, and said publicly that an elected official like Street should not run the party because they could blur the lines between what is best for the organization and their personal ambition. He was the first Black person to serve as chair.

During his tenure from 2022 to 2025, the Philadelphia Inquirer reported that Democratic voter registration in the state "dropped precipitously, fundraising stagnated, and Pennsylvania Democrats had a disastrous 2024 that saw all five of the party's statewide nominees lose." Balaban said "[Street] was asleep at the switch while the Democratic registration advantage over Republicans shrunk radically."

In 2023, the Pennsylvania Democratic Party printed out thousands of cards with the wrong election date. Politico reported that this, among other problems like party layoffs and low fundraising, raised questions "about the competency of its leadership, including state party chair Sharif Street."

In July 2025, Governor Shapiro and Democratic National Committee chair Ken Martin questioned whether Street should remain state party chair. On August 25, Street announced he would step down from the chairmanship to focus on his congressional campaign.

When Eugene DePasquale took over as the new chair in 2025, the party was unable to make payroll just two months away from a high-stakes Supreme Court retention race. The party’s federal political action committee had less than $24,000 on hand. The voter registration disadvantage has reversed since DePasquale has been in charge.

=== 2022 U.S. Senate election ===
On April 1, 2021, Street filed as a candidate for the Democratic nomination in the 2022 United States Senate election in Pennsylvania. He ended his campaign in January 2022.

=== 2026 congressional election ===
In 2025, Street entered the Democratic primary for Pennsylvania's 3rd congressional district to succeed Congressman Dwight Evans after he announced his retirement. Street received the support of Philadelphia Mayor Cherelle Parker and New Jersey Senator Cory Booker.

Street's campaigned on his experience at the state level increasing investment in Philadelphia, expanding healthcare access, and criminal justice reform. He has been critical of Benjamin Netanyahu's government in Israel, but asserts his belief in a two-state solution, and does not describe the Gaza genocide as a "genocide".

Street was defeated in the Democratic primary, finishing in second to state representative Chris Rabb, a democratic socialist considered to be running to Street's left.

Party political offices
Preceded by Nancy Patton Mills	Chair of the Pennsylvania Democratic Party; 2022–2025	Succeeded by Eugene DePasquale
