= Joseph E. Coleman =

American politician

Joseph Coleman

President of the Philadelphia City Council
- In office October 30, 1980^{[a]} – January 6, 1992
- Preceded by: George Schwartz
- Succeeded by: John Street

Member of the Philadelphia City Council from the 8th District
- In office January 3, 1972 – January 6, 1992
- Preceded by: David Cohen
- Succeeded by: Herbert DeBeary

Personal details
- Born: 1922
- Died: December 31, 2000 Mount Airy, Philadelphia, Pennsylvania
- Party: Democratic
- Spouse: Jessie Bryant Coleman
- Children: 2
- Education: Albright College
- Profession: Chemist; Patent attorney Author; Politician
- a.Acting President from June 20, 1980 through October 29, 1980.

Joseph E. Coleman (1922-2000) was an American politician, attorney and chemist. He was a member of the Democratic Party.

== Early life ==
Coleman was born in 1922, and grew up in Mississippi during a time in which the southern United States was dominated by racial segregation and the Jim Crow laws. In 1948, he became the first African-American to earn a degree, a B.S. in chemistry, from Albright College. He went on to work as a research chemist, patent attorney and author.

== City council ==
In 1971, Coleman was elected to be president of the Philadelphia City Council, representing the Eighth District.

=== Presidency ===
In June 1980, incumbent Council President George Schwartz was implicated in the Abscam scandal, and resigned. Coleman became Acting Council President, and was unanimously elected to the post when Council reconvened in October. He became the first African-American elected to the post in the city's history.

As President, Coleman sought to maintain a more conciliatory atmosphere than the more combative Schwartz. Anna Verna, a close friend and colleague of Coleman's (who went on to become the City Council's first female President in 1999), characterized Coleman's leadership style as "calm". He also sought to clean up the Council's image in the wake of Abscam, while dramatically increasing the Council's oversight of Mayoral projects and plans.

He saw-off a challenge to his presidency following the 1987 elections, when Joan Krajewski, also a Democrat, sought to unseat him.

=== Retirement ===
After surviving a tough re-election contest in 1987, in which the Philadelphia Inquirer strongly endorsed his Republican opponent, Coleman announced that he would not seek re-election on February 14, 1991. Herbert DeBeary, a former Democratic primary opponent of Coleman's, went on to win the election to succeed him.

== Personal life ==
Coleman was married, and had three children—a son and two daughters. In September 1997, his daughter, Stephanie Coleman Epps, was shot to death in front of her two children by a former boyfriend. Coleman, who was suffering from the effects of diabetes, was unable to attend the trial, though the man was convicted of the murder and sentenced to death in December of that year.

== Death and honors ==
On December 31, 2000, Coleman died in the Mount Airy home he shared with his wife, Jessie.

The Community Education Centers named its Philadelphia-area treatment center after Coleman. The Center's clients are referred through the Pennsylvania Department of Corrections, the Pennsylvania Board of Probation and Parole, or the Bucks County Department of Corrections. The Center, named Coleman Hall, provides an array of residential reentry treatment services designed to reduce recidivism. In 2002, the Philadelphia Free Library system's Northwest Regional Library, located in Germantown, was renamed the Joseph E. Coleman Northwest Regional Library.

Albright College also created a scholarship award in Coleman's honor. The Distinguished Joseph E. Coleman Award provides financial assistance ranging from $8,000 to $12,000 to African-American students that show academic excellence as well as community and/or extracurricular involvement.

Philadelphia City Council
| Preceded by George Schwartz | President of the Philadelphia City Council; 1980–1992 | Succeeded by John Street |
| Preceded by David Cohen | Member of the Philadelphia City Council for the 8th District; 1972–1992 | Succeeded by Herbert DeBeary |
