= Joseph T. Murphy =

American lawyer and judge

Judge Joseph T. Murphy

Joseph T. Murphy (October 21, 1910 – October 14, 1992) was an American lawyer and judge from Philadelphia.

== Formative years ==
Murphy was born in 1910 in Philadelphia's Frankford neighborhood, the son of James and Fannie Murphy. He graduated from Northeast Catholic High School in 1929, a member of the school's first graduating class. He later earned a bachelor's degree from Saint Joseph's University in 1933 and a law degree from the University of Pennsylvania Law School in 1936.

== Career ==
He practiced law in Philadelphia, specializing in real estate. From 1943 to 1947, he was an attorney for the United States Department of Agriculture.

Murphy was also active in local Republican Party politics. He ran for city council in 1951, but finished a distant fourth in the 6th district Republican primary. In 1960, Republican ward leaders nominated him for the 6th district seat in a special election following the death of Democrat Michael J. Towey. Murphy pledged to fight tax hikes and public housing expansion proposed by the Democrat-led city government. His run was unsuccessful as he lost to Democrat William A. Dwyer, Jr. by a substantial margin.

In 1968, Governor Raymond P. Shafer named Murphy to a seat on the Philadelphia Municipal Court and he won an uncontested election to a full term the following year. Governor Milton Shapp appointed him to the Pennsylvania Court of Common Pleas in 1972. On that court, one of his most notable decisions was in the case of former CIA agent George Fassnacht, who was found to have a massive stockpile of munitions in his Fox Chase home. Murphy ruled that the police acted improperly when they seized the weapons without a warrant.

Murphy won a retention election in 1973 for another ten-year term on the bench and spent most of his time on the court presiding over criminal cases. In 1974, City Controller Tom Gola charged Murphy with borrowing firearms from evidence for personal use. No charges were filed over what turned out to be a common practice on the court, but the rules were changed the following year to prevent recurrences.

In 1978, the Pennsylvania Constitution was amended to require judges to retire at age 70. Murphy and four other judges in their late sixties challenged the law in court. They were successful in U.S. district court, but lost on appeal to the Third Circuit. Murphy turned 70 in 1980 and took senior status on the court. He continued to hear cases until 1991.

== Death ==
In 1992, Murphy died from a heart attack at the age of 81.
