= George X. Schwartz =

American politician

President of the Philadelphia City Council
- In office January 3, 1972 – May 29, 1980
- Preceded by: Paul D'Ortona
- Succeeded by: Joseph E. Coleman

Member of the Philadelphia City Council from the 4th district
- In office January 4, 1960 – June 1, 1980
- Preceded by: Samuel Rose
- Succeeded by: Ann J. Land

Member of the Pennsylvania House of Representatives from the Philadelphia County district
- In office January 1, 1957 – January 4, 1960
- In office January 6, 1953 – November 30, 1954

Personal details
- Born: January 28, 1915 New York City, U.S.
- Died: March 26, 2010 (aged 95) Philadelphia, Pennsylvania, U.S.
- Party: Democratic
- Spouse: Jerre
- Children: 3
- Education: Temple University

George X. Schwartz (January 28, 1915 – March 26, 2010) was a Democratic politician who served as a member of the Philadelphia City Council for two decades.

== Early life ==
Though he was born in New York City, Schwartz grew up in West Philadelphia, the son of a successful real estate broker. He graduated from West Philadelphia High School in 1932, earned an undergraduate degree from Temple University in 1936, and graduated from Temple Law School in 1940.

== Political career ==
=== State House ===
He made his first foray into politics in 1952, when he was elected to one of Philadelphia County's allotted at-large seats in the Pennsylvania State House. However, he was not re-elected as a member of the county's delegation two years later. He was able to regain a seat in the 1956 election, with the help of Democratic City Committee Chairman and Congressman William J. Green Jr.

=== Leader of the 34th Democratic Ward ===
In 1962, Schwartz became the leader of the 34th Ward in West Philadelphia, defeating Leontina Papa by a vote of 56 to 23. He remained ward leader until stepping down in 1982.

=== City Council ===
Schwartz was elected to Philadelphia City Council in a special election in 1960, winning the 4th District seat, once again with the help and encouragement of Green. The district had previously been represented by Samuel Rose, a Democrat and part-time boxing promoter who had died of complications from a heart attack earlier that year. He was elected Council President in 1972, when Paul D'Ortona announced he would not seek re-election to the position. Schwartz's tenure as President was marked by an active and ironfisted rule. He set the course of virtually every piece of legislation, dominated the Council's Democratic caucus, and controlled most of the political patronage.

Schwartz occasionally clashed with Mayor Frank Rizzo. When Schwartz refused to join Rizzo in opposing Arlen Specter's 1973 bid for a third term as District Attorney, Rizzo ordered his Police Commissioner to form a special hand-picked 34-member police squad to spy on Schwartz. He would come to be known by the nickname "the silver fox" while he was serving on the Council, due to his graying hair, distinguished figure, and political clout.

During his tenure as Council President, he brought several Philadelphia politicians onto his staff, including Lynne Abraham to do legislative and policy work for him. Schwartz also got Bob Brady (Later a Congressman and longtime and incumbent head of Philadelphia's Democratic Party) his first political job as a sergeant-at-arms for City Council proceedings.

==== Abscam involvement ====
In January 1980, Schwartz met with two men at a suite at the Barclay Hotel in Rittenhouse Square. The men claimed to represent an Arab Sheikh who was interested in building a hotel in Philadelphia. The men, who were actually FBI agents, agreed to pay Schwartz $30,000 in exchange for his use of his influence over Council to get the project approved. Schwartz was recorded telling the men, "We got five or six members [of City Council]...You tell me your birthday. I'll give them to you for your birthday." The scandal would later come to be known as "Abscam" (short for Arab Scam), and would take-down five Congressman, including First District Congressman Ozzie Myers, who would become the first member of the House to be expelled since the Civil War, and two other members of the City Council, Majority Leader Harry Jannotti and Louis Johanson.

Schwartz was indicted on charges of accepting a bribe, extortion and conspiracy on May 23, 1980. He resigned as Council President six days later, and left the Council altogether three days later.

Both Schwartz and Jannotti initially claimed that they were entrapped into taking the bribes. Indeed, the Abscam investigation would later come under criticism for excess involvement by government agents seeking to push bribes on public officials. Both men were initially convicted of the charges against them, but later had their convictions overturned by the District Court, which agreed with their assertion that they were entrapped. However, the Appellate Court later reversed the District Court's decision and reinstated the verdicts. The case finally reached the Supreme Court in mid-1982, and in the first high court ruling on Abscam, the Court concurred with the Appellate Court's findings and let the convictions stand.

Both men began serving their sentences in Federal Prison on April 22, 1985. Schwartz had been sentenced to 366 days and was also ordered to pay a $10,000 fine.

== Later life ==
After his release from prison, Schwartz largely remained out of politics. He did maintain contact with Bob Brady, who had succeeded him as leader of Democratic City Committee's 34th Ward, and supported his 2007 Mayoral campaign. Schwartz also actively supported Lynne Abraham's campaigns for District Attorney.

His wife, Jerre, died in 1994. The couple had one son, two daughters and ten grandchildren.

=== Death and legacy ===
Schwartz died of complications from pneumonia at his home in Rittenhouse Square in March 2010.

His continuing political legacy was largely shaped by the careers he helped launch both by virtue of his power, as well as his downfall. He is seen as instrumental in the successful political careers of both Abraham and Brady. Additionally, it was his conviction and resignation from Council that allowed Joe Coleman to ascend to the Council Presidency, becoming the first African-American to hold the office. Coleman, who wanted to distance the Council from the Abscam-related taint, sought to be a more conciliatory leader than Schwartz, leading some observers to describe the Council as unruly, and prompting Mayor Bill Green, III (the son of Schwartz's mentor) to call the Council "the worst legislative body in the free world." Coleman's successor, John Street, sought to return more power to the office of President, and was seen as instrumental in helping get Ed Rendell's legislative agenda enacted. Some observers therefore credit Schwartz with indirectly helping Rendell and Street by showing the virtues of a strong Council President.

Philadelphia City Council
Preceded by Paul D'Ortona	President of the Philadelphia City Council; 1972–1980	Succeeded by Joseph E. Coleman
Preceded by Samuel Rose	Member of the Philadelphia City Council for the 4th District; 1960–1980	Succeeded by Ann J. Land
