= Edward F. McNulty =

American politician

Edward Francis McNulty (May 27, 1905 – March 21, 1980) was a Republican politician in Philadelphia who served for a term on the Philadelphia City Council.

McNulty was born in Philadelphia in 1905, the son of John and Anna McNulty. Born and raised in Philadelphia's Port Richmond neighborhood, he was given the nickname "Happy" at a young age, in tribute to his smiling disposition. McNulty attended parochial school at Nativity of the Blessed Virgin Mary Catholic Church, but dropped out at age 14 to find work. He worked in the local chemical industry, eventually rising to become foreman of the plastics division of Allied Chemical Company. He also became involved in local politics, and was elected a Republican committeeman in 1931; two years later, he was named ward leader of the 25th ward, a position he held for forty years. In 1934, he married Ida Lafferty, with whom he had four children.

In 1963, McNulty was the Republican nominee for city council from the sixth district. In what the Philadelphia Daily News called "one of the biggest surprises" of the election that November, he narrowly defeated the incumbent, Democrat William A. Dwyer Jr. On the Council, he earned a reputation as a quiet but well-liked legislator. Nevertheless, when the time came for reelection, party leaders looked for a different candidate to take McNulty's place. When the party hierarchy endorsed former city controller Frank J. Tiemann for the sixth district seat, McNulty entered the primary anyway. Tiemann won the primary. In the general election, Tiemann lost to Democrat Joseph L. Zazyczny.

After leaving office, McNulty worked for the state Department of Revenue as an auditor. He retired in 1970 and moved to Cherry Hill, New Jersey. In 1980, he died at Washington Memorial Hospital in Turnersville, New Jersey, at the age of 74.

== Sources ==
- "1920 United States Federal Census, T625_1628, page 11A". Ancestry.com.
- Bellinger, Harry (November 6, 1963). "GOP Adds New Voice To Council". Philadelphia Daily News. p. 4 – via Newspapers.com.
- "Richmond Revolt Rumors Don't Faze Council's McNulty". Philadelphia Daily News. February 23, 1967. p. 10 – via Newspapers.com.
- "GOP Snub Challenged in 6th District Race by Councilman McNulty". The Philadelphia Inquirer. March 9, 1967. p. 53 – via Newspapers.com.
- Eady, James (May 18, 1967). "Tate Democrats Win Primaries for Council in 10th, 6th Districts". The Philadelphia Inquirer. pp. 31, 34 – via Newspapers.com.
- Lordan, Francis M. (November 8, 1967). "Democrats Keep 13-4 Council Edge; 2 Races May Go To Court". The Philadelphia Inquirer. p. 5 – via Newspapers.com.
- Van Atta, Burr (March 25, 1980). "Edward F. McNulty, 74, former councilman". The Philadelphia Inquirer. p. 4-B – via Newspapers.com.
