= Pennsylvania House of Representatives, District 181 =

American legislative district

Pennsylvania's 181st State House of Representatives district
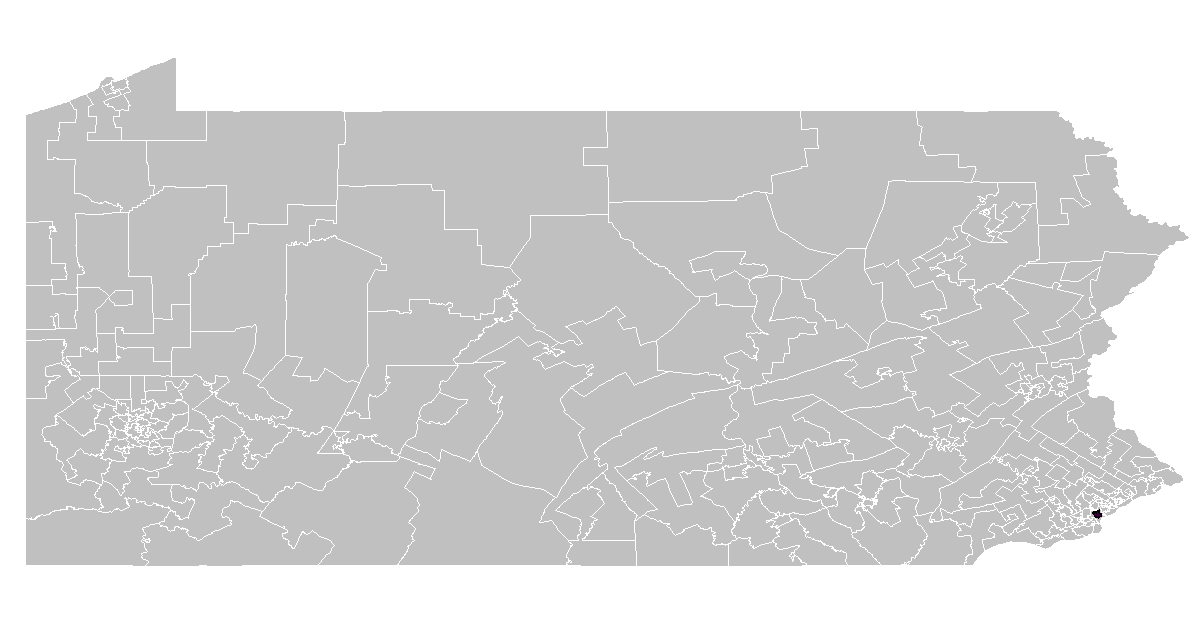
Representative
Malcolm Kenyatta; D–Philadelphia
- Demographics: 25.5% White; 61.8% Black; 13.4% Hispanic
- Population (2011) • Citizens of voting age: 60,446; 47,395

The 181st Pennsylvania House of Representatives District is located in Philadelphia and is represented by Malcolm Kenyatta.

== District profile ==
The 181st Pennsylvania House of Representatives District is located in Philadelphia County. It also includes the following areas:

- Ward 05 [PART, Divisions 15, 20 and 23]
- Ward 14
- Ward 16 [PART, Divisions 06, 07, 08, 09, 10, 11, 12, 13, 14, 15, 16, 17 and 18]
- Ward 18 [PART, Divisions 01, 03, 08, 09, 13, 14, 15 and 16]
- Ward 20
- Ward 32 [PART, Divisions 05, 06, 07, 08, 09, 11 and 12]
- Ward 37 [PART, Divisions 01, 02, 03, 04, 05, 06, 07, 08, 09, 10, 11, 12, 13, 14, 17 and 21]
- Ward 47

== Representatives ==
Representative	Party	Years	District home	Note
Prior to 1969, seats were apportioned by county.
Ulysses Shelton	Democratic	1969 – 1978		Resigned May 23, 1978.
T. Milton Street	Democratic	1979 – 1980		
Alphonso Deal	Democratic	1981 – 1987		Died June 3, 1987.
Shirley Kitchen	Democratic	1987 – 1988		
W. Curtis Thomas	Democratic	1989 – 2018		Retired
Malcolm Kenyatta	Democratic	2019 – Present		

== Recent election results ==
PA House election, 2010: Pennsylvania House, District 181
Party	Candidate	Votes	%	±%
Democratic	Curtis Thomas	14,555	100.0	
Margin of victory				
Turnout		14,555	100.0	

PA House election, 2012: Pennsylvania House, District 181
Party	Candidate	Votes	%	±%
Democratic	Curtis Thomas	25,275	100.0	
Margin of victory				
Turnout		25,275	100.0	

PA House election, 2014: Pennsylvania House, District 181
Party	Candidate	Votes	%	±%
Democratic	Curtis Thomas	12,988	100.0	
Margin of victory				
Turnout		12,988	100.0	

PA House election, 2016: Pennsylvania House, District 181
Party	Candidate	Votes	%	±%
Democratic	Curtis Thomas	27,603	100.0	
Margin of victory				
Turnout		27,603	100	

PA House election, 2018: Pennsylvania House, District 181
Party	Candidate	Votes	%	±%
Democratic	Malcolm Kenyatta	20,843	95.29	
Republican	T. Milton Street	1,019	4.66	
Margin of victory				
Turnout		21,884	95.29	
