= Michael Nutter =

Mayor of Philadelphia from 2008 to 2016

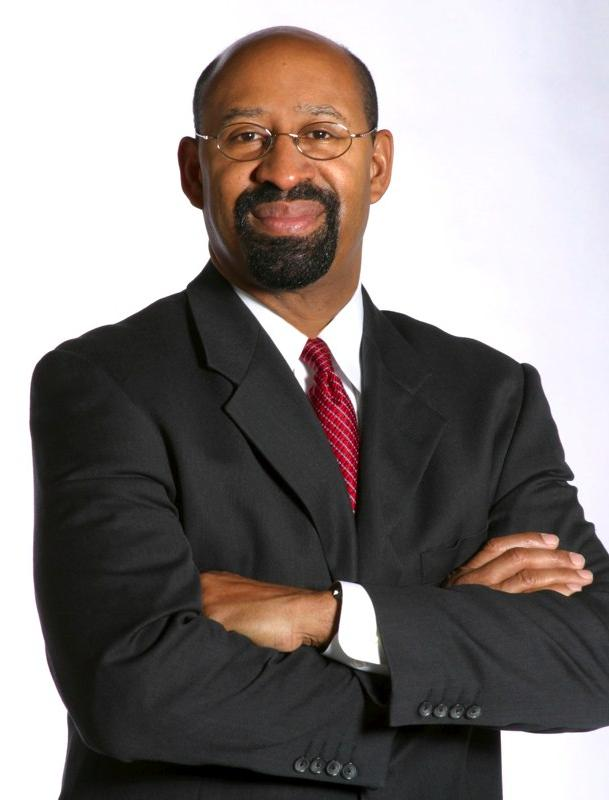

98th Mayor of Philadelphia
- In office January 7, 2008 – January 4, 2016
- Preceded by: John F. Street
- Succeeded by: Jim Kenney

70th President of the United States Conference of Mayors
- In office 2012–2013
- Preceded by: Antonio Villaraigosa
- Succeeded by: Scott Smith

Member of the Philadelphia City Council from the 4th district
- In office January 7, 1992 – July 7, 2006
- Preceded by: Ann Land
- Succeeded by: Carol Campbell

Personal details
- Born: Michael Anthony Nutter; June 29, 1957 (age 69) Philadelphia, Pennsylvania, U.S.
- Party: Democratic
- Spouse: Lisa Nutter (m. 1991)
- Education: University of Pennsylvania (BS)

Michael Anthony Nutter (born June 29, 1957) is an American politician who served as the 98th Mayor of Philadelphia from 2008 to 2016. A member of the Democratic Party, he is also a former member of the Philadelphia City Council from the 4th district and had served as the 52nd Ward Democratic Leader until 1990. Nutter also served as the President of the United States Conference of Mayors from 2012 to 2013, and is a former member of the Homeland Security Advisory Council.

Currently, he is the David N. Dinkins Professor of Professional Practice in Urban and Public Affairs at the School of International and Public Affairs, Columbia University.

== Early life and education ==
Nutter was born in Philadelphia, Pennsylvania, and grew up in West Philadelphia. Raised Catholic, he attended elementary school at Transfiguration of Our Lord Catholic Elementary School and later St. Joseph's Preparatory School in North Philadelphia where he was known affectionately as "Big Nut". He graduated from The Wharton School at the University of Pennsylvania in 1979 with a degree in business. During his sophomore year in college, he started working as a DJ at Club Impulse in Philadelphia, where he was known as Mix Master Mike. After graduating from college, Nutter began to work at Xerox, and then at an investment banking firm. While in office, Nutter occasionally worked as DJ and a singer.

== Philadelphia City Council ==
=== Elections ===
Nutter, then-leader of the 52nd ward of Philadelphia, initially challenged Democratic incumbent Ann Land for a seat on the Philadelphia City Council in 1987. He was unsuccessful in his initial bid but defeated Land, four years later.

In February 2003, Nutter was elected chairman of the Pennsylvania Convention Center Authority Board.

=== Tenure ===
In June 2002, Nutter proposed a measure mandating that college students under 23 register their address, license plate, car registration, and insurance with their school. The school would then affix a "student" sticker to the car, resulting in triple fines for traffic, parking violations, or other offenses. Additionally, the ordinance required students in off-campus housing to disclose their student status to landlords.

In September 2004, Nutter introduced legislation creating an independent Ethics Board and proposed updates to the city's Ethics Code, including training for officials, advisory opinions, violation adjudication, and civil fines. These changes were adopted by late 2005. Voters approved the Ethics Board ballot question on May 16, 2006, with an 81% majority, and it was established on November 27, 2006.

Nutter sponsored "The Clean Indoor Air Worker Protection Law", expanding the definition of "public places" where smoking is not allowed to include restaurants and many bars, which Mayor Street eventually signed into law. Nutter's local bidder preference program, which took effect on July 1, 2004, gives preference to Philadelphia businesses in competitive bidding on City contracts greater than $25,000.

In January 2005, Philadelphia announced a library reorganization plan in which 20 branches would shift from full-day service to half-day service, and that many head librarians would be laid off. Library supporters rejected these changes and petitioned the Mayor and city council to restore service and staffing levels. The City Council rejected the Administration's cut, funding was restored, and by the fall of 2005 all library branches had full-day service, Saturday hours, and a head librarian. As mayor, Nutter sought to close eleven libraries until city council brought a suit that kept the libraries open.

He supported having the City of Philadelphia declare a "Crime Emergency" in selected areas of Philadelphia. This would have stationed more officers in certain areas of Philadelphia, limited the ability to gather on public sidewalks, imposed a curfew for all residents, and limited the ability to travel in certain areas. The proposal included a warrant-less police search technique known as "stop and frisk." Nutter claims that this approach is sufficiently similar to one that was found to be Constitutional by the United States Supreme Court in 1968 in Terry v. Ohio, but it still has not been determined if this specific exercise is in violation of Fourth Amendment rights. A version of this plan was later implemented by Nutter and was the target of a lawsuit.

Nutter has supported the eviction of the Cradle of Liberty Council of the Boy Scouts of America from their headquarters on the Benjamin Franklin Parkway, both as a councilman and as mayor. In a televised debate on NBC 10 Live @ Issue he said, "In my administration, we will not subsidize discrimination." The Cradle of Liberty Council of the Boy Scouts of America eventually won their case.

In September 2012, Mayor Nutter attended the Ugandan North American Association (UNAA) convention in Philadelphia, Pennsylvania, according to a statement carried by the New Viison.

== Mayor of Philadelphia ==
=== Elections ===
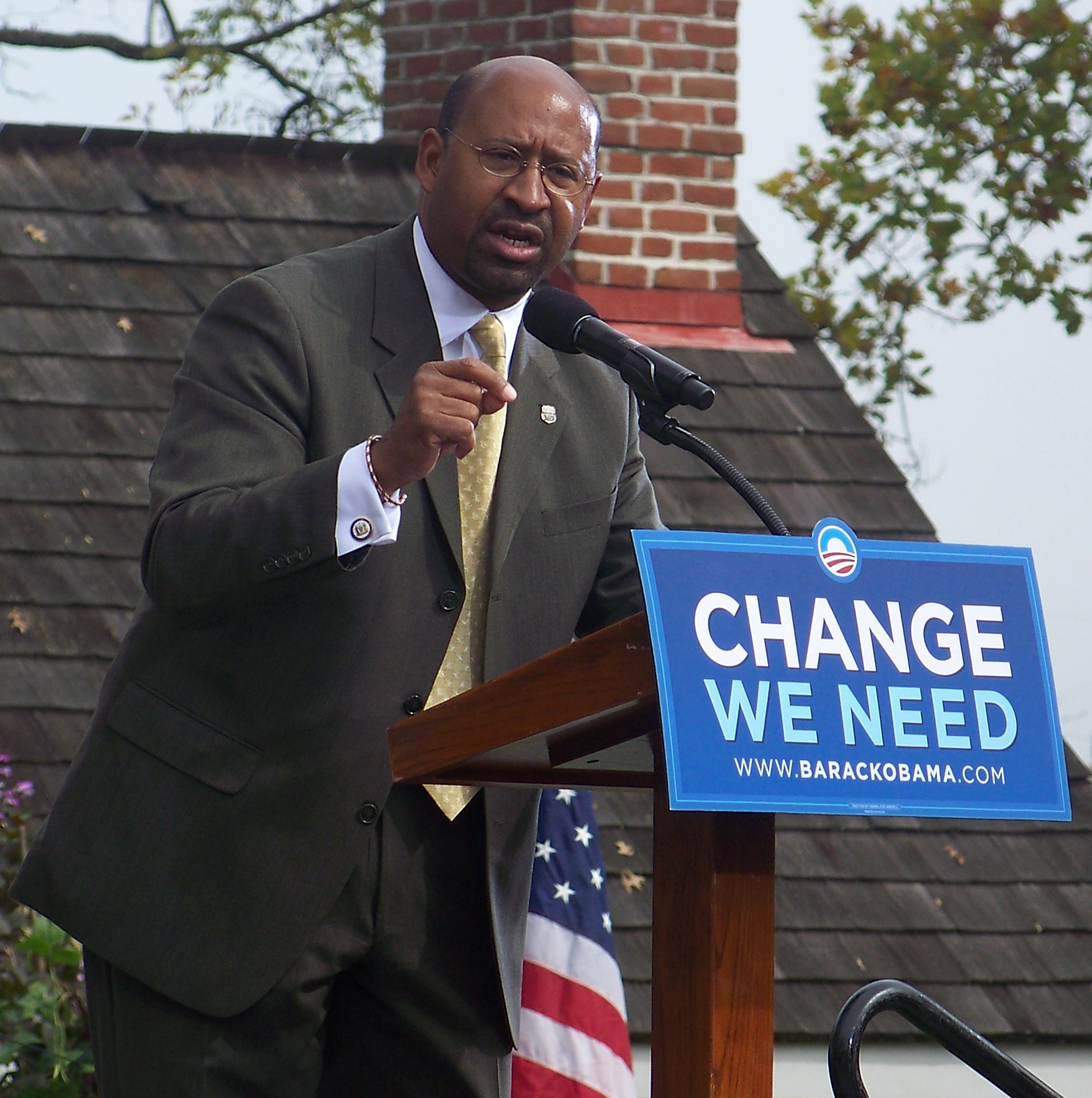
Nutter campaigning in support of Barack Obama.

Nutter resigned from the city council in 2006 in order to focus on running for mayor the following year; he later resigned as Chairman of the Pennsylvania Convention Center Authority Board in April 2007. In his mayoral campaign, he received endorsements from The Philadelphia Inquirer, Philadelphia Daily News, Philadelphia magazine, Northeast Times, Philadelphia City Paper, Philadelphia Weekly, The Daily Pennsylvanian, Philly for Change, the Penn Democrats, and Clean Water Action.

Nutter won the Democratic primary election on May 15 with 37% of the vote; He then went on to win the general election on November 6, 2007, with 83% of the vote against Republican nominee Al Taubenberger's 13%.

Nutter announced that he would run for reelection on December 22, 2010. He won the primary election against Milton Street with 76% of the vote, and the general election with 75% of the vote.

=== Public safety ===
==== PhillyRising ====
In 2010, Nutter commissioned a pilot project labeled "Public Service Areas" to supplement police response with a coordinated effort from other city agencies in areas of the city plagued with chronic issues of crime and disorder. After some initial signs of crime reduction in the Hartranft community of North Philadelphia, the pilot was renamed "the PhillyRising Collaborative" and expanded across each of the Philadelphia Police Department's six divisions. Each neighborhood selected for participation in PhillyRising is chosen based on an evaluation data regarding levels of crime, disorder, and other quality of life data.

Since its inception in 2010, the PhillyRising Collaborative has supported crime reduction through improved quality of life in some of Philadelphia's most challenged communities. The team has supported active citizens with a variety of strategies, including the creation of three public computer labs (Hartranft, Frankford, & Kensington), and three Citizens' Engagement Academies (Hartranft, Swampoodle/Strawberry Mansion, & Point Breeze) which have produced 65 resident graduates. PhillyRising has also helped re-open the Hartranft Community Pool and brought the Police Athletic League to Hartranft Elementary School. These efforts, and many others, have helped to produce an average reduction of Part 1 Crimes by 4% and Part 2 Crimes by 9.5% after a full year of PhillyRising involvement in the pilot neighborhood. These reductions are significantly greater than those for the surrounding Police District.

==== RISE ====
Through Mayoral Executive Order, Nutter created the Mayor's Office of Reintegration Services for Ex-offenders (RISE) prioritizing the needs of returning citizens. Its mission emphasizes and formalizes the commitment of the Nutter Administration to promote safer communities and reduce law enforcement costs, assisting ex-offenders to be constructive individuals who contribute positively to our Philadelphia community, thereby reducing recidivism. As a City department, rather than a contract agency, RISE now has an ability to take lead/coordinator/partner role with grant funding solicitations. There are additional synergies and efficiencies created from the sharing of City resources. RISE has increased reentry activity levels despite a decrease in funding from $3.2 million to $1.4 million. The number of walk-in clients serviced has doubled (944 vs. 2339) and the number of clients enrolled in services has increased (531 vs. 731). In addition, there has been a 31% increase in number of clients employed (180 vs. 253).

==== Reducing youth violence ====
In October 2011, Nutter with New Orleans Mayor Mitch Landrieu created Cities United, an initiative to reducing African-American male on African-American male violence. Cities United works to prevent violence in a collaborative effort among mayors, foundations, national nonprofits, federal agencies and youth.

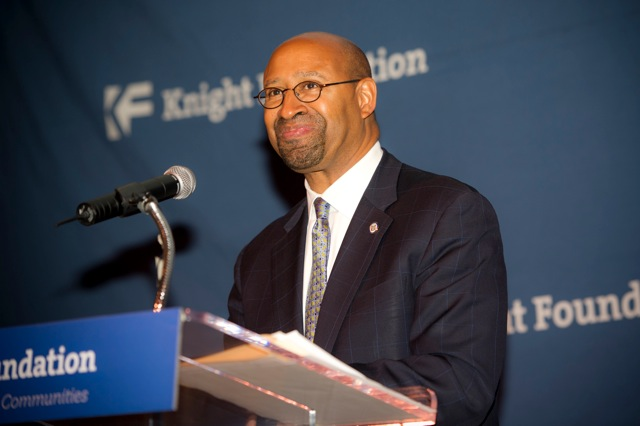
Nutter speaks to the Knight Foundation in 2012.

Nutter also initiated the Youth Violence Reduction Partnership. The YVRP includes the City Probation & Parole, the Police and the Philadelphia Anti-Drug Anti Violence Network working in targeted police districts to identify youth at risk of becoming involved in crime and providing them support through access to employment, education, mentoring, health care and drug treatment.

=== Sustainability ===
In 2009, Nutter announced Greenworks, the city's plan to become the greenest city in America by 2015. Greenworks outlines 15 measurable targets and 166 initiatives in five topic areas: energy, environment, equity, economy, and engagement. As of June 21, 2013, 95% of the 166 initiatives were either complete or underway. Four years into the six-year implementation timeline, two-thirds of the targets show trends toward meeting established goals. Some specific highlights of current progress include: reduction of municipal energy use by 7 percent; alternative energy use increase from 2.5 to 14 percent; nearly 90,000 trees planted since 2008; City Council passage of energy bench-marking and disclosure legislation; and 11.6 new miles of trails completed since 2011.

In 2012, Mayor Nutter signed Bill No. 120428 which amends the 'Energy Conservation' portion of the Philadelphia Code to require large commercial buildings to benchmark and report energy and water usage data to the city. The bill's purpose is not only to make organizations aware of their energy use, but also to identify opportunities for improvement and assist in establishing energy consumption baselines that will help set future goals.

Nutter also implemented the city's first guaranteed energy-savings project at the city's four largest downtown office buildings. In 2011, Nutter began implementing nine energy-conservation measures in the city's largest downtown office buildings.

=== Education ===
In 2008, Nutter established the Mayor's Office of Education to work on the related goals of increasing the high school graduation rate to 80 percent by 2015 and raising the rate of Philadelphia residents with a college degree to 36 percent by 2018. Currently, the on-time high school graduation rate is 64 percent and the percentage of residents with a 4-year college degree or higher is 24.3 percent. Since, 2007, the high school graduation rate has increased by 11 percentage points.

==== School funding ====
On September 11, 2013, Nutter launched the Philadelphia Education Supplies Fund, a fundraising campaign to provide funds to schools within the city to purchase consumable supplemental classroom supplies, including workbooks, paper, pens, and pencils. Under the stated criteria, schools with at least a 50% free and reduced price lunch population were eligible to apply, and those with more than 75% free and reduced-price lunches will receive greater amounts, in each case based on enrollment. The city has contributed $200,000 to the fund, and intends to do the same for at least five years. Over $540,000 was raised for the fund and 255 schools will receive funds, this includes 209 School District of Philadelphia schools, 20 charters, 13 Archdiocesan, and 13 independent/private.

==== Strengthening K-12 educational systems ====
In December 2011, the Great Schools Compact was signed by the city, the Commonwealth of Pennsylvania, the SDP, the Pennsylvania Coalition of Public Charter Schools (PCPCS), the Philadelphia Charters for Excellence (PCE) and the Archdiocese. The agreement is designed to increase cooperation among Philadelphia K-12 education providers, establish and share consistent academic metrics, and expand high-quality educational options available to students. The Great Schools Compact was awarded $2.5 million by the Bill & Melinda Gates Foundation in December 2012 to improve teacher effectiveness, create an Urban Leadership Academy for District and Charter principals, and align benchmark assessments to the Common Core standard, a federal effort to define the knowledge and skills that students receive during their K-12 education careers so that they will graduate high school able to succeed in entry-level jobs, credit bearing academic college courses and in workforce training programs.

==== College access and success ====
In November 2008, Nutter re-constituted the Youth Council as the Philadelphia Council for College and Career Success – composed of leaders from government, K-12 and higher education, employers, foundations and youth-focused community organizations – to organize and lead education improvement efforts. The Mayor's office of Education also convenes the College Completion Committee which includes "retention officers" from area colleges and universities and senior leadership from the School District of Philadelphia.

The Mayor's Office of Education is involved with cross-sector collaborations such as the College Prep Roundtable, and the Gates Millennium Scholarship Campaign. Examples of College Prep Roundtable programs include Philadelphia Academies, Inc., GEAR UP, Upward Bound, and College Access Centers. The two signature campaigns focus on issues related to college affordability, financial aid and FAFSA completion, and has resulted in a 21.7% increase in completed Free Applications for Federal Student Aid (FAFSA) from 2008 through 2012. The Mayor's office also partners with the national Gates millennium Scholarship Program to offer orientation to competitive scholarship programs to high achieving seniors who commit to completing the application (which includes eight essays). In 2012, close to 500 applications were received, the second highest in the country, and five out of seven Pennsylvania recipients were Philadelphians.

In February 2010, the city launched PhillyGoes2College, a program designed to help Philadelphians go to college. The effort includes a one-stop office in City Hall and a companion website that provides comprehensive guidance and referral information to students of any age who are interested in attending or completing college. Through workshops, school visits and large-scale college-promoting events, PhillyGoes2College has reached over 29,000 citizens since it opened in 2010, including 9,343 in FY13.

In March 2011, the Graduation Coach Campaign was brought under the umbrella of PhillyGoes2College. The campaign focuses on engaging adults in taking on a more robust role in helping the young people in their lives graduate from high school, get into college, and plan for a career. Since September 2010, the campaign has trained over 4,300 Coaches through 315 workshops.

==== Other educational programs and initiatives ====
In June 2011, Nutter signed the Education Accountability Agreement to formalize a request for improved Information sharing and coordination between the city, Commonwealth and the School District of Philadelphia. Through the agreement, the City required the School District of Philadelphia to make data public on various expenditures, placed executive advisers from the state and city inside the School District of Philadelphia and required the School District of Philadelphia to develop and implement a Five-Year Plan.

The Mayor's Returning to Learning Partnership allows City employees to pursue a college education by taking advantage of the tuition discount program offered by 13 area colleges and universities. Employees receive a 25% discount on tuition for each course for which they enroll and in some cases may also receive a full or partial scholarship to attend select institutions. The program is now housed in the city's "Center of Excellence".

=== Other initiatives ===
==== Philly311 ====
In December 2008, Nutter launched the City of Philadelphia's first 311 service. Philly311 was implemented to provide the public with access to all city services and information. Residents can connect with Philly311 by telephone, email, mail, a walk-in center or through the Philly Mobile App. Philly311 has also extended its service through various social media channels. Since the beginning of 2012, Philly311 has seen a 360% increase in its social media followers.

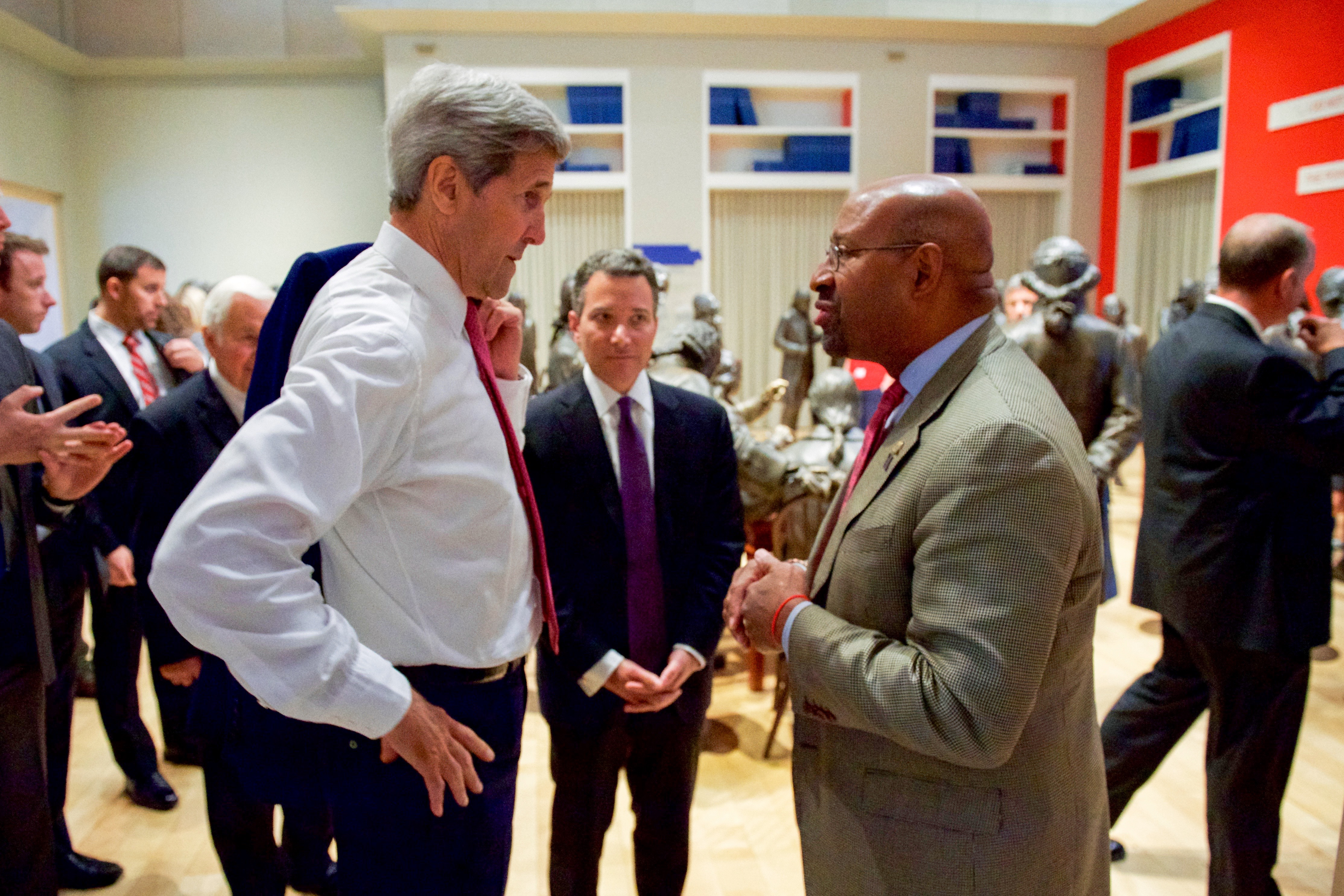
Mayor Nutter speaks with Secretary of State John Kerry.

==== Sanctuary city status ====
In April 2014, Nutter signed an executive order largely ending the agreement that allowed the federal government to detain undocumented immigrants arrested in the city prior to release. The only exemption being if the individual is being released following a first or second degree felony conviction and federal officials obtain a warrant from a judge - effectively making Philadelphia a sanctuary city. Nutter indicated that the change in policy supports public safety and will help rebuild the trust between police and the immigrant community. The executive order was highlighted in June 2014 after a previously deported undocumented immigrant from Honduras was accused of raping a woman in Rittenhouse Square with the concern that if acquitted, the accused would not be submitted for deportation due to Philadelphia's new policy.

== Personal life ==
As of 2014, Michael Nutter was a member of Mt. Carmel Baptist Church in West Philadelphia.

== See also ==
- List of mayors of the largest 50 US cities
- History of African Americans in Philadelphia

Political offices
Preceded by John Street	Mayor of Philadelphia; 2008–2016	Succeeded by Jim Kenney
