= William A. Dwyer Jr. =

American judge (1914–1982)

Judge William A. Dwyer Jr.

William Aloysius Dwyer Jr. (November 1, 1914 – December 12, 1982) was an American lawyer, judge, and Democratic politician from Philadelphia. He served on the Philadelphia City Council from 1960 to 1963 and on the Pennsylvania Court of Common Pleas from 1967 until his death in 1982.

== Early life ==
Dwyer was born in Philadelphia's Kensington neighborhood in 1914, the son of William and Madeline Dwyer. He attended St. Edward the Confessor parochial school in Kensington before moving on to Saint Joseph's Preparatory School for high school. After graduating, he attended Saint Joseph's University, where he received a bachelor's degree in 1940. He enrolled in law school at Temple University, graduating in 1943.

While in law school, Dwyer joined the United States Navy. He served as a communications officer for the Seventh Fleet in World War II's Pacific Theater, where he was often involved in active combat. In 1946, his military service ended and he returned to Philadelphia to practice law. After several years in private practice, he worked as a Deputy State Attorney General from 1954 to 1958.

Dwyer had been involved in Democratic Party politics in the city since his youth, and he continued that association after the war. He ran for a seat on the Philadelphia Municipal Court in 1955, but lost in the Democratic primary. In 1959, he ran again but later agreed to withdraw from the Democratic primary in favor of candidates who had the backing of the party organization.

== City Councilman ==
In 1960, Governor David L. Lawrence nominated Dwyer for a seat on the State Tax Equalization Board, but the appointment was held up when the Republican-led State Senate refused to confirm him. Dwyer had been elected leader of the 23rd Ward that year and when City Councilman Michael J. Towey died in September, Dwyer was considered a top contender for the job. Dwyer was nominated by his fellow ward leaders for the special election that November, and Leader withdrew the appointment to the Tax Board. In the election, Dwyer easily defeated his Republican opponent, Joseph T. Murphy, taking two-thirds of the vote.

Dwyer took his seat shortly after the election and was assigned to chair the Labor and Civil Service committee. As a grand jury investigation began into graft in the administration of Mayor Richardson Dilworth, Dwyer became one of the mayor's most strident defenders, questioning the prosecutors' political motivations and voting against increased funding for the probe. He filed suit to have W. Wilson White removed as lead prosecutor on the case, but quickly withdrew it when Dilworth expressed disapproval. Later that year, a separate investigation looked into zoning changes in Northeast Philadelphia that Dwyer had expedited through City Council.

In 1963, Dwyer was nominated for a full term on city council, easily dispatching two primary opponents. In what the Philadelphia Daily News called "one of the biggest surprises" of the election that November, Dwyer narrowly lost to his Republican opponent, Edward F. McNulty. After his defeat, Dwyer was among the contenders to succeed William J. Green Jr. in Congress following his death in December 1963, but Dwyer and other ward leaders ultimately supported Green's son, William J. Green, III, for the seat.

== Judge ==
In 1967, Dwyer ran for a seat on the Pennsylvania Court of Common Pleas. Despite not receiving the backing of the party hierarchy (but with the endorsement of Mayor James Tate), he finished first among eight candidates in the Democratic primary that May defeating the incumbent, Edward A. Kallick. Dwyer's victory drew criticism from Republicans and some Democrats as a violation of the "sitting judge" principle, by which incumbent judges in Pennsylvania are traditionally endorsed by both parties. Dwyer refused to step aside, and the issue drew unusual attention to the judge race. Dwyer defeated Kallick, who had won the Republican primary, by a narrow 7000-vote margin out of 677,000 votes cast.

Dwyer was assigned to the Family Court division, and spent much of his tenure on the bench presiding over domestic relations cases. He also later spent time presiding over juvenile court and criminal court. He ran for another ten-year term in a retention election in 1977 and won. He remained on the court past his 68th birthday in 1982, when he had a stroke and died several days later. After a funeral at the Cathedral Basilica of Saints Peter and Paul, he was buried in Holy Sepulcher Cemetery in Cheltenham, Pennsylvania.

== Sources ==
- "1920 United States Federal Census, T625_1622, page 6A". Ancestry.com.
- "Complete Results in City-Wide Balloting". The Philadelphia Inquirer. May 19, 1955. p. 14 – via Newspapers.com.
- "Bipartisan Deal Averts Judgeship Contests as Four Candidates Quit". The Philadelphia Inquirer. March 24, 1959. p. 6 – via Newspapers.com.
- "Nov. 8 Election Is Set For City Council Seat". The Philadelphia Inquirer. October 7, 1960. p. 6 – via Newspapers.com.
- "Dwyer Nominee In Council Race". The Philadelphia Inquirer. October 12, 1960. p. 6 – via Newspapers.com.
- "Democrats Retain 2 Seats in Council". The Philadelphia Inquirer. November 9, 1960. p. 7 – via Newspapers.com.
- "Schwartz, Dwyer Head Council Units". The Philadelphia Inquirer. December 16, 1960. p. 9 – via Newspapers.com.
- Feist, William F.; Collins, William B. (August 3, 1962). "Council Delays Funds For Probe, But Judge Orders Jury Selected; Griffin Accused of Dilworth Bias". The Philadelphia Inquirer. pp. 1, 4 – via Newspapers.com.
- "Editorial: Dwyer Changes His Mind". The Philadelphia Inquirer. August 16, 1962. p. 20 – via Newspapers.com.
- Karafin, Harry J.; McAdams, Leonard J. (December 14, 1962). "State Probes Unusual Speed in 2 Zoning Cases; Jury Told To 'Call the Big Operators'". The Philadelphia Inquirer. pp. 1, 12–13 – via Newspapers.com.
- "Disunity Costs Independents Council Chance". The Philadelphia Inquirer. May 23, 1963. p. 4 – via Newspapers.com.
- Bellinger, Harry (November 6, 1963). "GOP Adds New Voice To Council". Philadelphia Daily News. p. 4 – via Newspapers.com.
- "Ward Leaders Select Son To Replace Green". The Philadelphia Inquirer. January 9, 1964. p. 1 – via Newspapers.com.
- "Dwyer Scores Big victory in Race for Judge". The Philadelphia Inquirer. May 17, 1967. p. 1 – via Newspapers.com.
- Miller, Joseph H. (June 15, 1967). "Tate Confirms Move To Force Dwyer Out of Race for Judgeship". The Philadelphia Inquirer. p. 7 – via Newspapers.com.
- Rieder, Rem (November 8, 1967). "Dwyer Defeats Kallick as Voters Repudiate Sitting-Judge 'Code'". The Philadelphia Inquirer. p. 7 – via Newspapers.com.
- "W. Dwyer, 68, Judge in Phila". The Philadelphia Inquirer. December 14, 1982. p. 25-A – via Newspapers.com.
