= Louis Johanson =

American politician

Member of the Philadelphia City Council
- In office January 1, 1968 – August 14, 1981
- Preceded by: Raymond Alexander
- Succeeded by: John White

Member of the Pennsylvania Senate from the 3rd district
- In office January 5, 1965 – November 30, 1966
- Preceded by: Peter Camiel
- Succeeded by: Herbert Arlene
- Constituency: Parts of Philadelphia

Personal details
- Born: Louis Carl Johanson; January 4, 1929 Philadelphia, Pennsylvania, U.S.
- Died: March 10, 2004 (aged 75) Longport, New Jersey, U.S.
- Party: Democratic

Louis Carl Johanson (January 4, 1929 – March 10, 2004) was an American politician from Pennsylvania who served as a Democratic member of the Pennsylvania State Senate for the 3rd district from 1965 to 1966. He served as a member of the Philadelphia City Council from 1968 to 1981. He was convicted for bribery and conspiracy during the Abscam sting operation and served three years in prison.

== Early life ==
Johanson was born in Philadelphia, Pennsylvania

== Biography ==
As a member of the Philadelphia City Council, he was implicated in the Abscam sting operation and was convicted for taking a bribe from FBI agents posing as representatives of an Arab sheik. He was defended by John J. Duffy, Jr. Johanson was convicted of bribery and conspiracy and sentenced to three years in prison and fined $20,000.

Johanson later moved to a home in Longport, New Jersey.
