= 2008 United States House of Representatives elections in Pennsylvania =

- November 4, 2008

All 19 Pennsylvania seats to the United States House of Representatives
	Majority party	Minority party
Party	Democratic	Republican
Last election	11	8
Seats won	12	7
Seat change	▲1	▼1
Popular vote	3,209,168	2,520,805
Percentage	55.45%	43.55%
Swing	▼0.12%	▲0.37%

Democratic hold Democratic gain
Republican hold
Democratic
40–50%
50–60%
60–70%
70–80%
80–90%
>90%
Republican
50–60%
60–70%
70–80%

The 2008 congressional elections in Pennsylvania was held on November 4, 2008, to determine who will represent the state of Pennsylvania in the United States House of Representatives. Pennsylvania has 19 seats in the House, apportioned according to the 2000 United States census. Representatives are elected for two-year terms; those elected will serve in the 111th Congress from January 4, 2009, until January 3, 2011. The election coincides with the 2008 U.S. presidential election.

District 3 was the only seat which changed party (from Republican to Democratic), although CQ Politics had forecasted districts 3, 4, 6, 8, 10, 11, 15 and 18 to be at some risk for the incumbent party. This was the last time the Democrats would win a majority of congressional districts in Pennsylvania until 2022.

== Match-up summary ==
District	Democratic		Republican		Others		Total		Result
District	Votes	%	Votes	%	Votes	%	Votes	%	Result
District 1	242,799	90.76%	24,714	9.24%	0	0.00%	267,513	100.00%	Democratic hold
District 2	276,870	88.93%	34,466	11.07%	0	0.00%	311,336	100.00%	Democratic hold
District 3	146,846	51.24%	139,757	48.76%	0	0.00%	286,603	100.00%	Democratic gain
District 4	186,536	55.86%	147,411	44.14%	0	0.00%	333,947	100.00%	Democratic hold
District 5	112,509	41.04%	155,513	56.72%	6,155	2.24%	274,177	100.00%	Republican hold
District 6	164,952	47.90%	179,423	52.10%	0	0.00%	344,375	100.00%	Republican hold
District 7	209,955	59.59%	142,362	40.41%	0	0.00%	352,317	100.00%	Democratic hold
District 8	197,869	56.77%	145,103	41.63%	5,543	1.59%	348,515	100.00%	Democratic hold
District 9	98,735	36.08%	174,951	63.92%	0	0.00%	273,686	100.00%	Republican hold
District 10	160,837	56.33%	124,681	43.67%	0	0.00%	285,518	100.00%	Democratic hold
District 11	146,379	51.63%	137,151	48.37%	0	0.00%	283,530	100.00%	Democratic hold
District 12	155,268	57.85%	113,120	42.15%	0	0.00%	268,388	100.00%	Democratic hold
District 13	196,868	62.79%	108,271	34.53%	8,374	2.67%	313,513	100.00%	Democratic hold
District 14	242,326	91.26%	0	0.00%	23,214	8.74%	265,540	100.00%	Democratic hold
District 15	128,333	41.43%	181,433	58.57%	0	0.00%	309,766	100.00%	Republican hold
District 16	120,193	39.39%	170,329	55.82%	14,645	4.80%	305,167	100.00%	Republican hold
District 17	192,699	63.68%	109,909	36.32%	0	0.00%	302,608	100.00%	Democratic hold
District 18	119,661	35.93%	213,349	64.07%	0	0.00%	333,010	100.00%	Republican hold
District 19	109,533	33.35%	218,862	66.65%	0	0.00%	328,395	100.00%	Republican hold
Total	3,209,168	55.45%	2,520,805	43.55%	57,931	1.00%	5,787,904	100.00%	

Popular vote
Democratic	55.57%
Republican	43.55%
Other	1.00%

House seats
Democratic	63.16%
Republican	36.84%

== District 1 ==
2008 Pennsylvania's 1st congressional district election
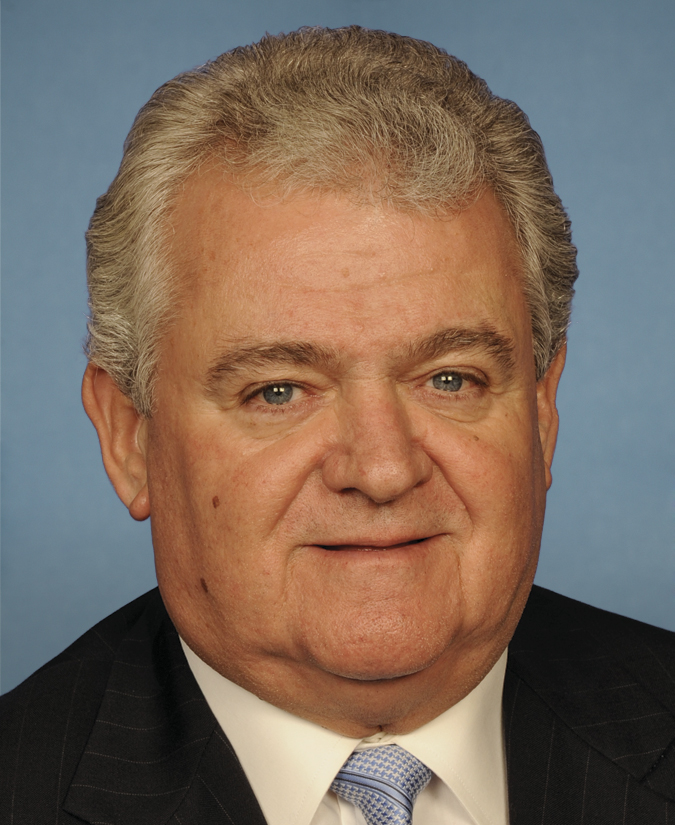

Nominee	Bob Brady	Mike Muhammad
Party	Democratic	Republican
Popular vote	242,799	24,714
Percentage	90.76%	9.24%
- County results Brady: 80–90% 90–100%
U.S. representative before election
Bob Brady
Democratic
Elected U.S. representative
Bob Brady
Democratic

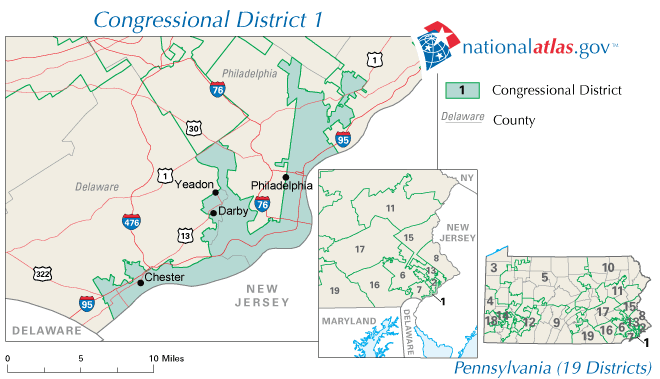

Five-term incumbent Bob Brady (D) ran for another term after losing his bid to be mayor of Philadelphia. He was challenged by businessman Mike Muhammad (R). This race was viewed as noncompetitive, as it took place in heavily Democratic Philadelphia. Brady ran unopposed in 2006 and has generally received over 80% of the vote in his campaigns.

=== Democratic primary ===
==== Candidates ====
===== Nominee =====
- Bob Brady, incumbent U.S. Representative

==== Primary results ====
Democratic primary results
Party	Candidate	Votes	%
Democratic	Bob Brady (incumbent)	116,334	100.0
Total votes		116,334	100.0

=== Republican primary ===
==== Candidates ====
===== Nominee =====
- Mike Muhammad, businessman

==== Primary results ====
Republican primary results
Party	Candidate	Votes	%
Republican	Mike Muhammad	4,637	100.0
Total votes		4,637	100.0

=== Predictions ===
Source	Ranking	As of
The Cook Political Report	Safe D	November 6, 2008
Rothenberg	Safe D	November 2, 2008
Sabato's Crystal Ball	Safe D	November 6, 2008
Real Clear Politics	Safe D	November 7, 2008
CQ Politics	Safe D	November 6, 2008

=== General election ===
2008 Pennsylvania's 1st congressional district election
Party	Candidate	Votes	%
Democratic	Bob Brady (incumbent)	242,799	90.76
Republican	Mike Muhammad	24,714	9.24
Total votes		267,513	100.00
Democratic hold			

- Race ranking and details from CQ Politics
- Campaign contributions from OpenSecrets

== District 2 ==
2008 Pennsylvania's 2nd congressional district election
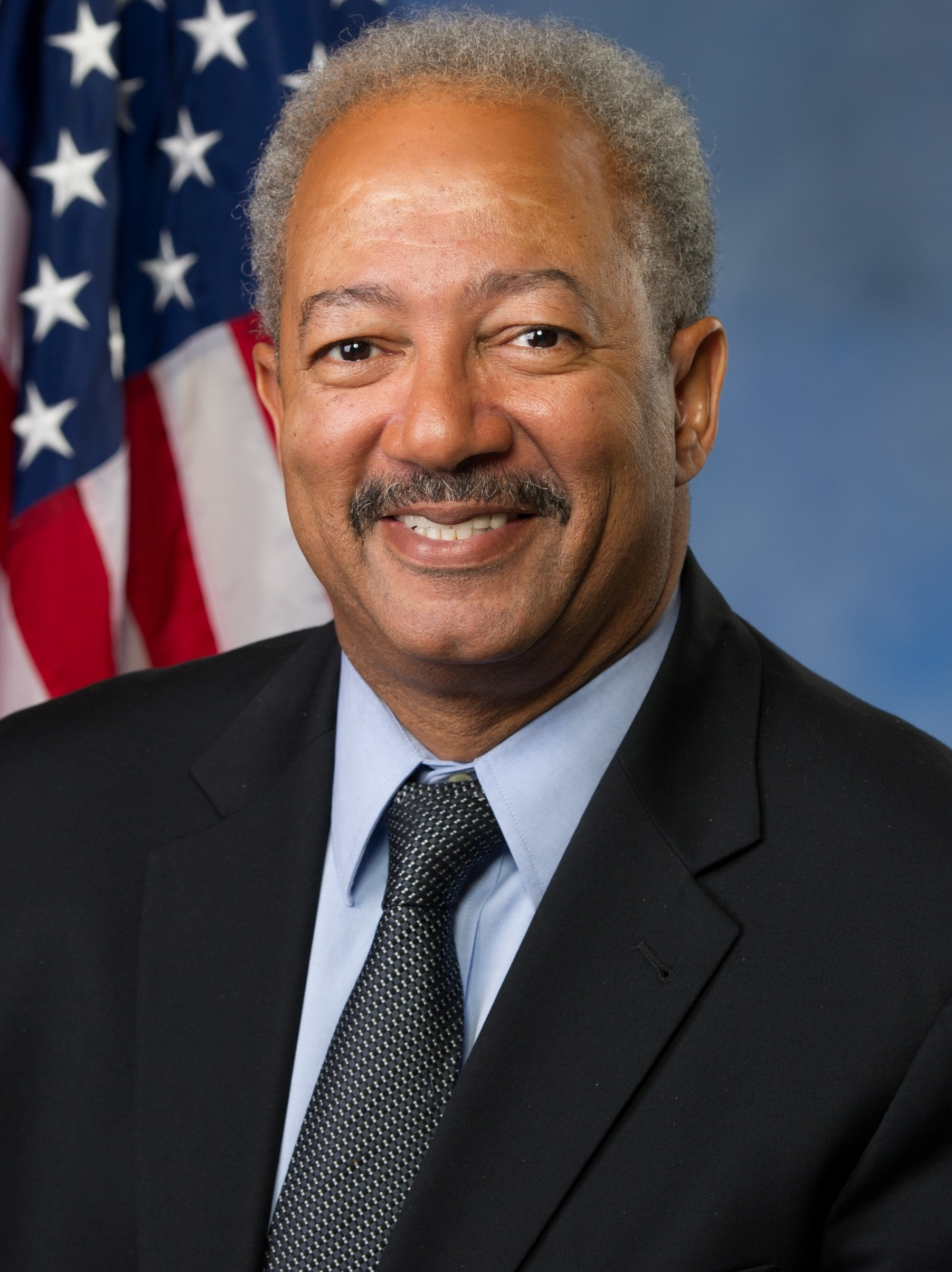

Nominee	Chaka Fattah	Adam Lang
Party	Democratic	Republican
Popular vote	276,870	34,466
Percentage	88.93%	11.07%
- County results Fattah: 70–80% 80–90%
U.S. representative before election
Chaka Fattah
Democratic
Elected U.S. representative
Chaka Fattah
Democratic

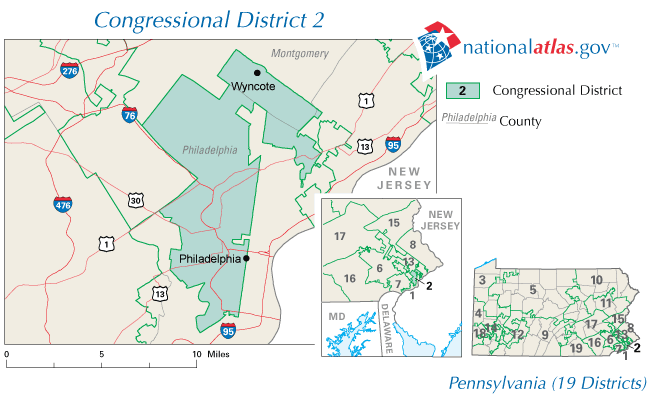

Seven term incumbent Chaka Fattah (D), who was unsuccessful in his bid to be mayor of Philadelphia, ran without major party opposition. Liberal Republican law professor Michael Livingston won the Republican primary, but dropped out of the race due to lack of funding. He was replaced by Adam Lang. This seat is contained in one of the most Democratic districts in the country, with Democrats often winning 90% of the vote. In 2006, Fattah was elected with 88.6% support and in 2008 he won with 88.9% of the vote.

=== Democratic primary ===
==== Candidates ====
===== Nominee =====
- Chaka Fattah, incumbent U.S. Representative

==== Primary results ====
Democratic primary results
Party	Candidate	Votes	%
Democratic	Chaka Fattah (incumbent)	161,022	100.00
Total votes		161,022	100.00

=== Republican primary ===
==== Candidates ====
===== Nominee =====
- Michael Livingston, law professor (Note: Dropped out due to lack of funding. Replaced by Adam Lang.)

==== Primary results ====
Republican primary results
Party	Candidate	Votes	%
Republican	Michael Livingston	4,521	100.00
Total votes		4,521	100.00

=== Predictions ===
Source	Ranking	As of
The Cook Political Report	Safe D	November 6, 2008
Rothenberg	Safe D	November 2, 2008
Sabato's Crystal Ball	Safe D	November 6, 2008
Real Clear Politics	Safe D	November 7, 2008
CQ Politics	Safe D	November 6, 2008

=== General election ===
2008 Pennsylvania's 2nd congressional district election
Party	Candidate	Votes	%
Democratic	Chaka Fattah (incumbent)	276,870	88.93
Republican	Adam Lang	34,466	11.07
Total votes		311,336	100.00
Democratic hold			

- Race ranking and details from CQ Politics
- Campaign contributions from OpenSecrets

== District 3 ==
2008 Pennsylvania's 3rd congressional district election
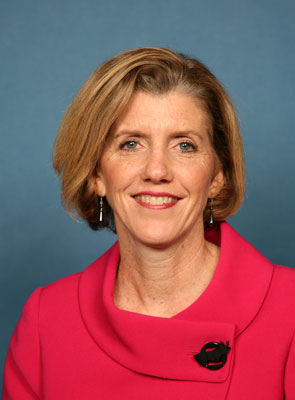

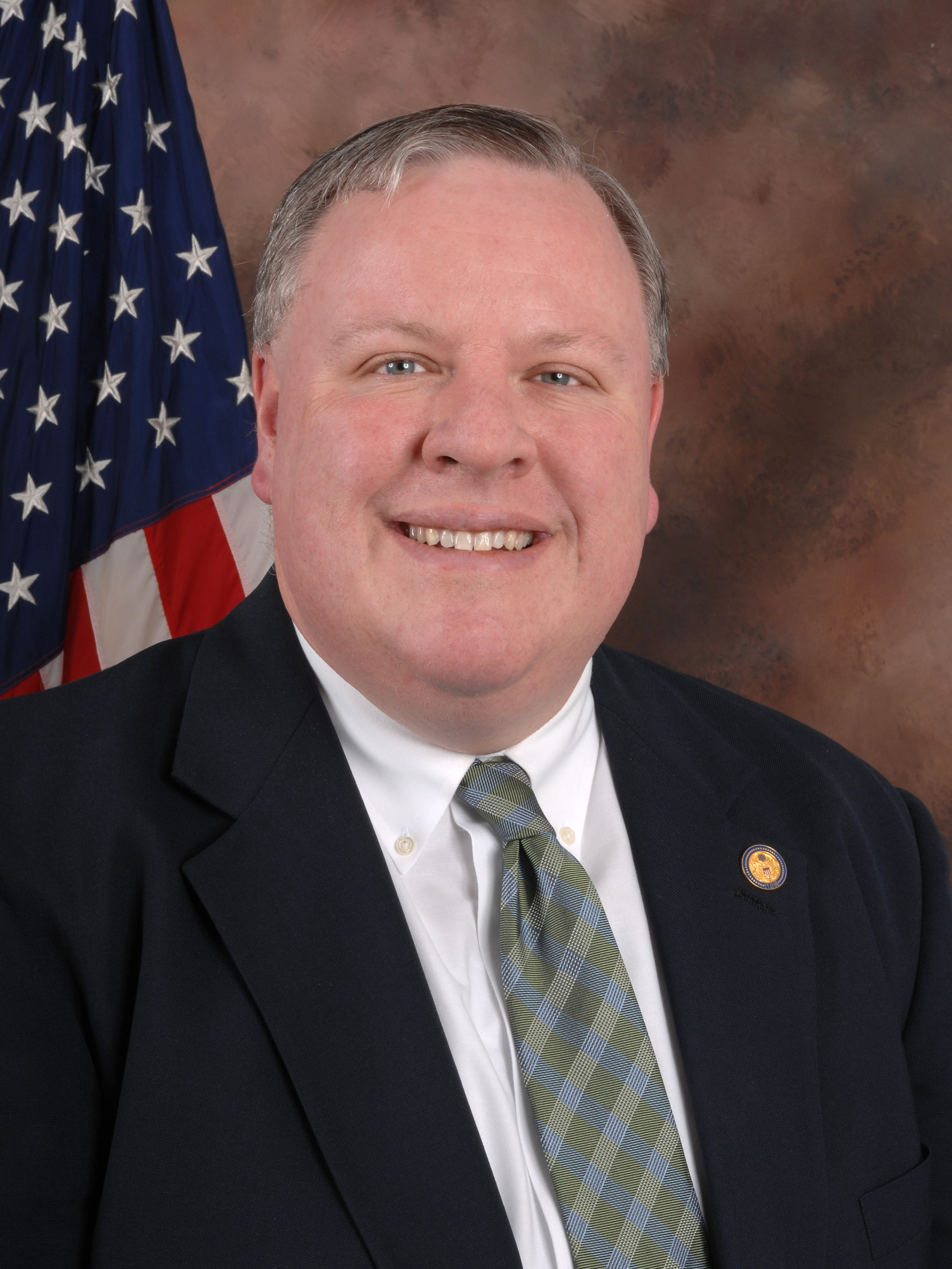
Nominee	Kathy Dahlkemper	Phil English
Party	Democratic	Republican
Popular vote	146,846	139,757
Percentage	51.24%	48.76%
- County results Dahlkemper: 50–60% English: 50–60% 60–70%
U.S. Representative before election
Phil English
Republican
Elected U.S. Representative
Kathy Dahlkemper
Democratic

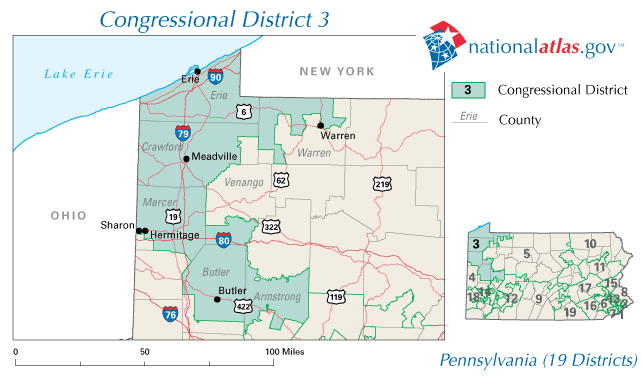

Seven-term Republican incumbent Phil English faced Democrat Kathy Dahlkemper (campaign website), director of the Erie Arboretum. Steven Porter, the 2006 Democratic nominee, ran as an independent.

English was tested in 2008. He represented a politically balanced Erie-based district that gave George W. Bush 53% of the vote. Also, in 2006, he received just 54% of the vote against an under-funded candidate with no political experience. He has, however, been able to remain a level of popularity due to a moderate voting record and close ties to organized labor.

The DCCC recruited Erie County Councilman Kyle Foust as its top choice to run against English. Dahlkemper, attorney Tom Meyers, and religious nonprofit program coordinator Mike Waltner also declared for the Democratic primary. Dahlkemper proved better at mobilizing support than Foust, the original front-runner, and won the Democratic nomination with 45% of the vote.

=== Democratic primary ===
==== Candidates ====
===== Nominee =====
- Kathy Dahlkemper, director of the Erie Arboretum

===== Eliminated in primary =====
- Kyle Foust, Erie County Councilman
- Tom Myers, attorney
- Mike Waltner, religious nonprofit program coordinator

==== Primary results ====
Democratic primary results
Party	Candidate	Votes	%
Democratic	Kathy Dahlkemper	43,858	44.91
Democratic	Kyle Foust	24,672	25.27
Democratic	Tom Myers	18,584	19.03
Democratic	Mike Waltner	10,532	10.79
Total votes		97,646	100.00

=== Republican primary ===
==== Candidates ====
===== Nominee =====
- Phil English, incumbent U.S. Representative

==== Primary results ====
Republican primary results
Party	Candidate	Votes	%
Republican	Phil English (incumbent)	42,636	100.00
Total votes		42,636	100.00

=== Predictions ===
Source	Ranking	As of
The Cook Political Report	Tossup	November 6, 2008
Rothenberg	Tilt D (flip)	November 2, 2008
Sabato's Crystal Ball	Lean D (flip)	November 6, 2008
Real Clear Politics	Tossup	November 7, 2008
CQ Politics	Tossup	November 6, 2008

2008 Pennsylvania's 3rd congressional district election
Party	Candidate	Votes	%
Democratic	Kathy Dahlkemper	146,846	51.24
Republican	Phil English (incumbent)	139,757	48.76
Total votes		286,603	100.00
Democratic gain from Republican			

- Race ranking and details from CQ Politics
- Campaign contributions from OpenSecrets
- English (R-i) vs Dahlkemper (D) graph of collected poll results from Pollster.com

== District 4 ==
2008 Pennsylvania's 4th congressional district election
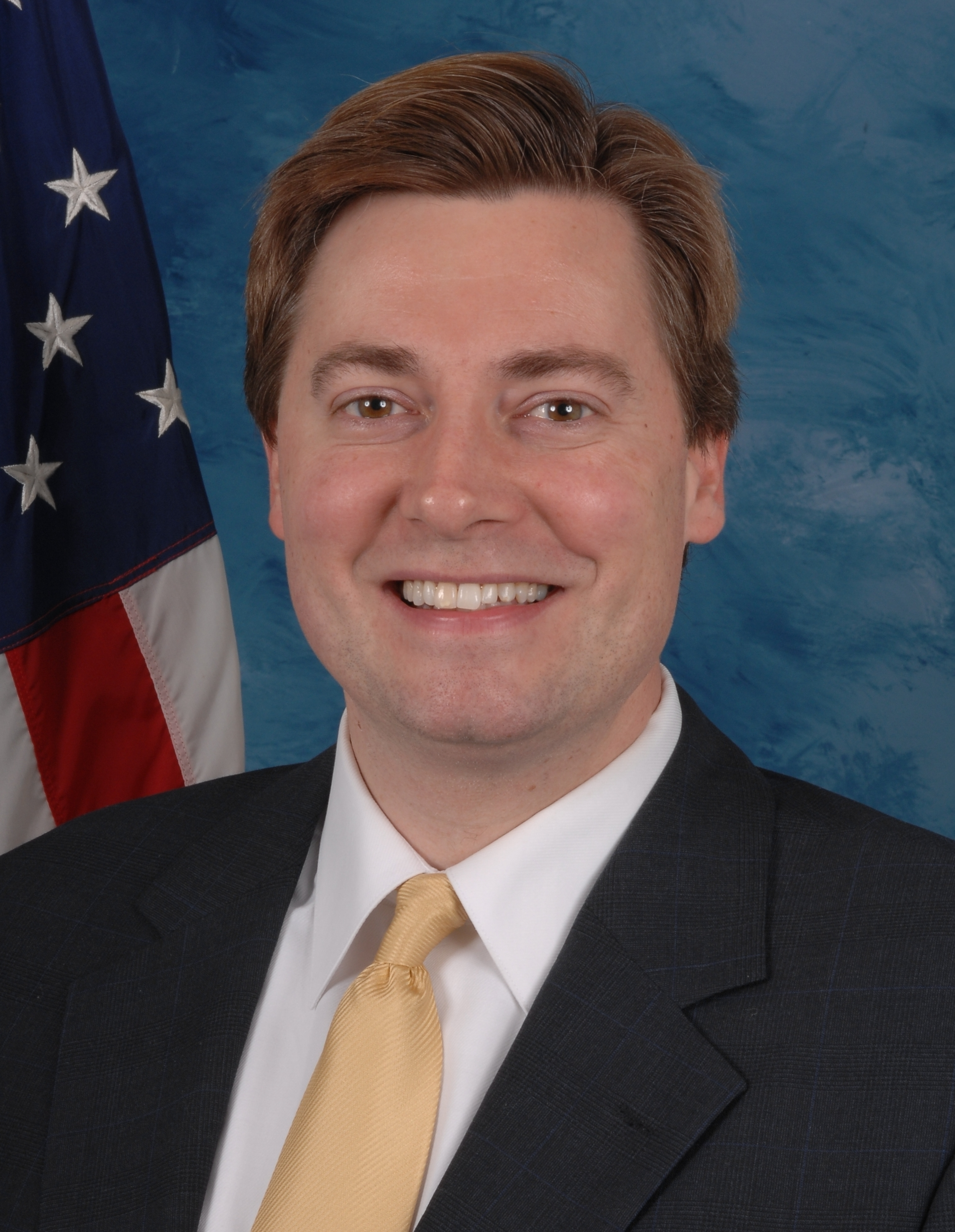

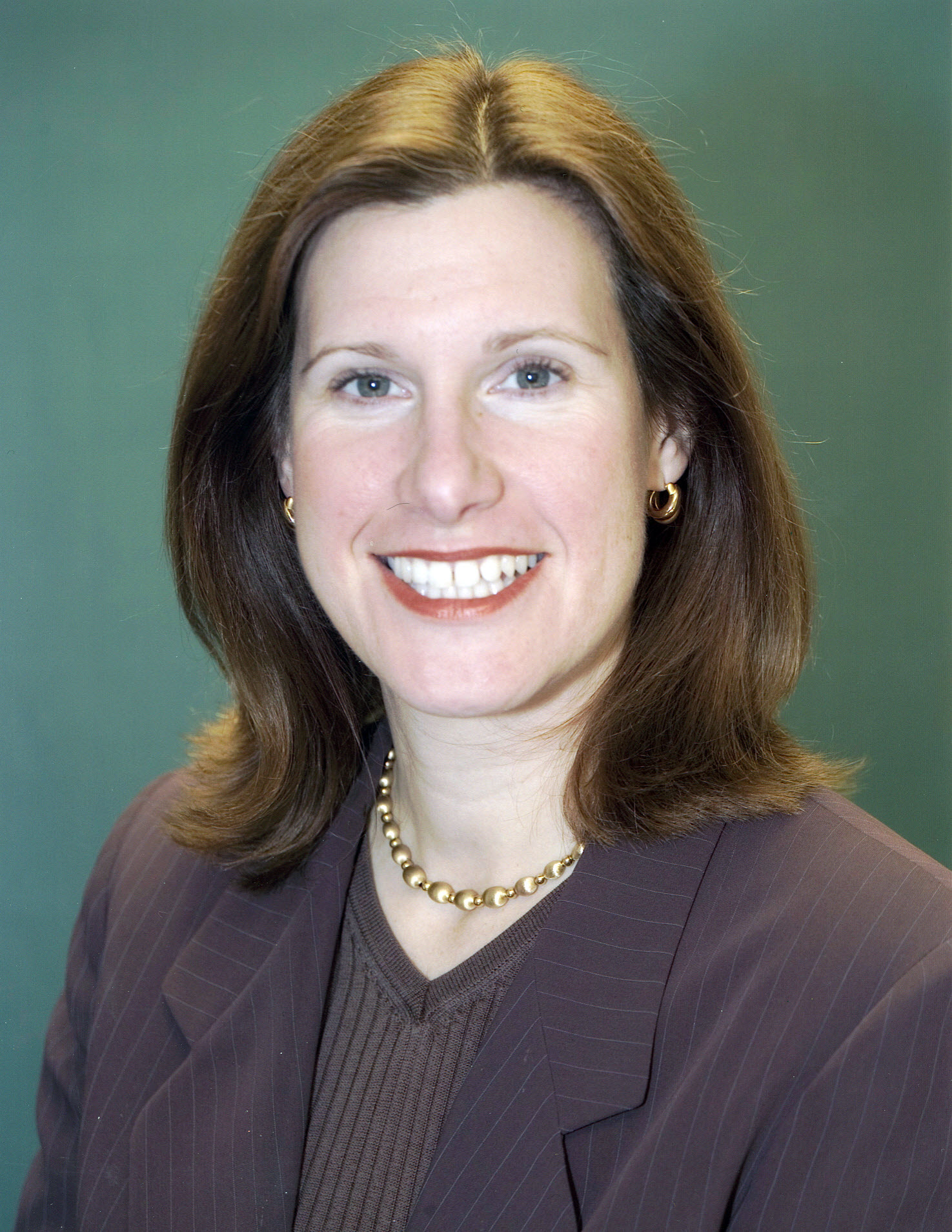
Nominee	Jason Altmire	Melissa Hart
Party	Democratic	Republican
Popular vote	186,536	147,411
Percentage	55.86%	44.14%
- County results Altmire: 50–60% 60–70% 70–80% Hart: 50–60%
U.S. representative before election
Jason Altmire
Democratic
Elected U.S. representative
Jason Altmire
Democratic

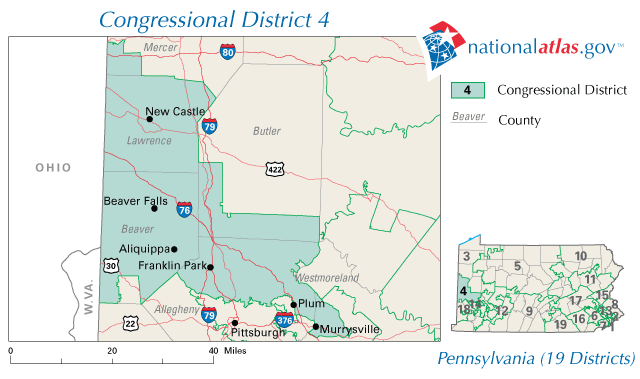

Democratic incumbent Jason Altmire again faced Republican Melissa Hart. In 2006, Altmire defeated incumbent Hart in a 52% to 48% upset. Hart had won 63% of the vote in 2004, when George W. Bush carried this suburban Pittsburgh district with 53%. In 2006, Pennsylvania was perhaps the most disastrous state for incumbent GOP House members, who lost four seats here. Hart ran unopposed for the Republican nomination in 2008 and attempted to use her public service credentials to regain her seat. She previously gained a reputation for appealing to moderate voters despite a conservative track record. She again lost to Altmire, this time by a wider margin than two years prior, with a 56–44% vote.

Altmire maintained close ties with organized labor, possessed experience with the health care issues that are important in a region with an older population, and was supported by the NRA.

=== Democratic primary ===
==== Candidates ====
===== Nominee =====
- Jason Altmire, incumbent U.S. Representative

==== Primary results ====
Democratic primary results
Party	Candidate	Votes	%
Democratic	Jason Altmire (incumbent)	112,049	100.00
Total votes		112,049	100.00

=== Republican primary ===
==== Candidates ====
===== Nominee =====
- Melissa Hart, former U.S. Representative

==== Primary results ====
Republican primary results
Party	Candidate	Votes	%
Republican	Melissa Hart	42,854	100.00
Total votes		42,854	100.00

=== Predictions ===
Source	Ranking	As of
The Cook Political Report	Likely D	November 6, 2008
Rothenberg	Safe D	November 2, 2008
Sabato's Crystal Ball	Lean D	November 6, 2008
Real Clear Politics	Safe D	November 7, 2008
CQ Politics	Likely D	November 6, 2008

=== General election ===
2008 Pennsylvania's 4th congressional district election
Party	Candidate	Votes	%
Democratic	Jason Altmire (incumbent)	186,536	55.86
Republican	Melissa Hart	147,411	44.14
Total votes		333,947	100.00
Democratic hold			

- Race ranking and details from CQ Politics
- Campaign contributions from OpenSecrets

== District 5 ==
2008 Pennsylvania's 5th congressional district election
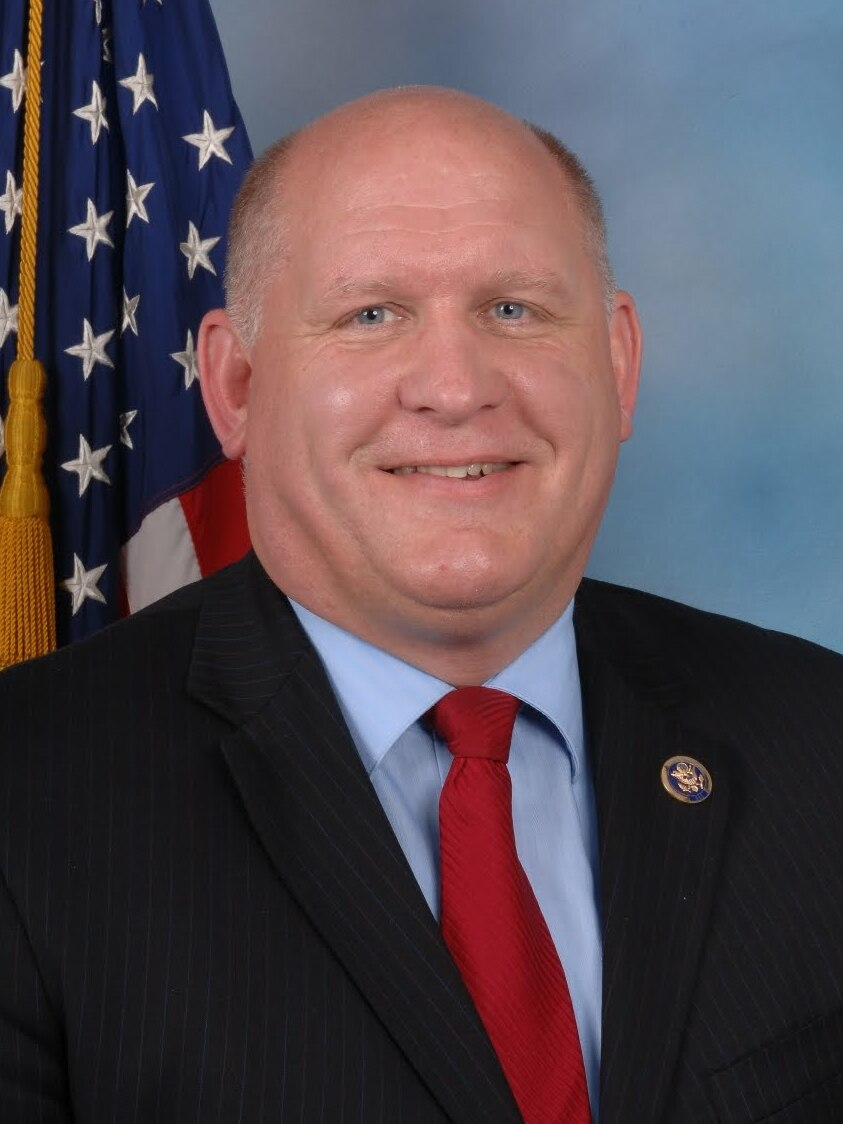

Nominee	Glenn "G.T." Thompson	Mark McCracken
Party	Republican	Democratic
Popular vote	155,513	112,509
Percentage	56.72%	41.04%
- County results Thompson: 50–60% 60–70% 70–80% McCracken: 40–50%
U.S. Representative before election
John E. Peterson
Republican
Elected U.S. Representative
Glenn "G.T." Thompson
Republican

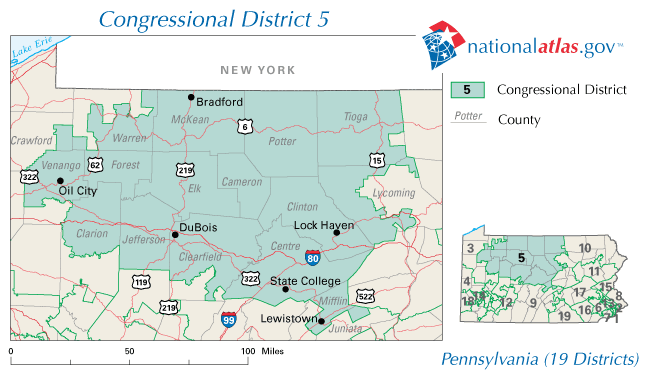

Democrat Mark McCracken, Clearfield County commissioner is running against Republican and Centre County GOP chair Glenn "G.T." Thompson in this open seat election. James Fryman represented the Libertarian Party.

Republican John Peterson announced his intention to retire on January 3, 2007, paving the way for a contentious open seat election. Nine Republicans were in the race for the nomination. Four men emerged as top tier candidates: Thompson, hotel developer Matt Shaner, financial consultant Derek Walker, and former Woodland Township supervisor Jeff Strohmann. Also on the Republican ballot were mortgage broker John Kupa, Clarion mayor John Stroup, Elk County coroner Lou Radkowski, former Centre County commissioner Chris Exarchos, and minister Keith Richardson. Thompson won this hard-fought 9-way primary with just 19% of the vote, in large part due to the late endorsement of Peterson who got involved in the primary campaign 10 days prior to election day. Walker and Shaner proved to be superior fundraisers and aired numerous television and radio commercials to counter Peterson's endorsement of Thompson. The Republican primary included many personal attacks, with Shaner targeting Walker as being political incompetent and Walker referring to a DUI incident involving Shaner. Walker and Thompson were very close in the polls on Election Day, but Thompson received a late boost because of his political track record in Centre County, the district's population center.

McCracken, Lock Haven mayor Richard Vilello, and Bill Cahir, a journalist and Marine Corps veteran of the Iraq War, battled for the Democratic nomination. McCracken won 40% in a hard-fought Democratic race that received much less attention. Despite presenting an open seat opportunity, this race was always viewed as safe for the Republicans, who have generally won over 65% in this district. Prior to 2006, Peterson had previously run in three straight elections without Democratic opposition.

=== Democratic primary ===
==== Candidates ====
===== Nominee =====
- Mark McCracken, Clearfield County commissioner

==== Eliminated in primary ====
- Bill Cahir, journalist and Iraq War veteran
- Richard Vilello, mayor of Lock Haven

==== Primary results ====
Democratic primary results
Party	Candidate	Votes	%
Democratic	Mark McCracken	30,358	40.92
Democratic	Bill Cahir	25,920	34.93
Democratic	Richard Vilello	17,921	24.15
Total votes		74,199	100.00

=== Republican primary ===
==== Candidates ====
===== Nominee =====
- Glenn Thompson, Centre County Republican Party chair

==== Eliminated in primary ====
- Chris Exarchos, former Centre County commissioner
- John Krupa, mortgage broker
- Lou Radkowski, coroner of Elk County
- Keith Richardson, minister
- Matt Shaner, hotel developer
- Jeffrey Stroehmann, former Woodland Township supervisor
- John Stroup, mayor of Clarion
- Derek Walker, financial consultant

==== Primary results ====
Republican primary results
Party	Candidate	Votes	%
Republican	Glenn Thompson	13,988	19.18
Republican	Derek Walker	13,153	18.03
Republican	Matt Shaner	12,860	17.63
Republican	Jeffrey Stroehmann	9,921	13.60
Republican	Keith Richardson	7,094	9.72
Republican	Lou Radkowski	5,083	6.97
Republican	John Stroup	4,550	6.24
Republican	Chris Exarchos	4,376	6.00
Republican	John Krupa	1,916	2.63
Total votes		72,941	100.00

=== Predictions ===
Source	Ranking	As of
The Cook Political Report	Likely R	November 6, 2008
Rothenberg	Safe R	November 2, 2008
Sabato's Crystal Ball	Safe R	November 6, 2008
Real Clear Politics	Safe R	November 7, 2008
CQ Politics	Safe R	November 6, 2008

=== General election ===
2008 Pennsylvania's 5th congressional district election
Party	Candidate	Votes	%
Republican	Glenn Thompson	155,513	56.72
Democratic	Mark McCracken	112,509	41.04
Libertarian	James Fryman	6,155	2.24
Total votes		274,177	100.00
Republican hold			

- Race ranking and details from CQ Politics
- Campaign contributions from OpenSecrets

== District 6 ==
2008 Pennsylvania's 6th congressional district election
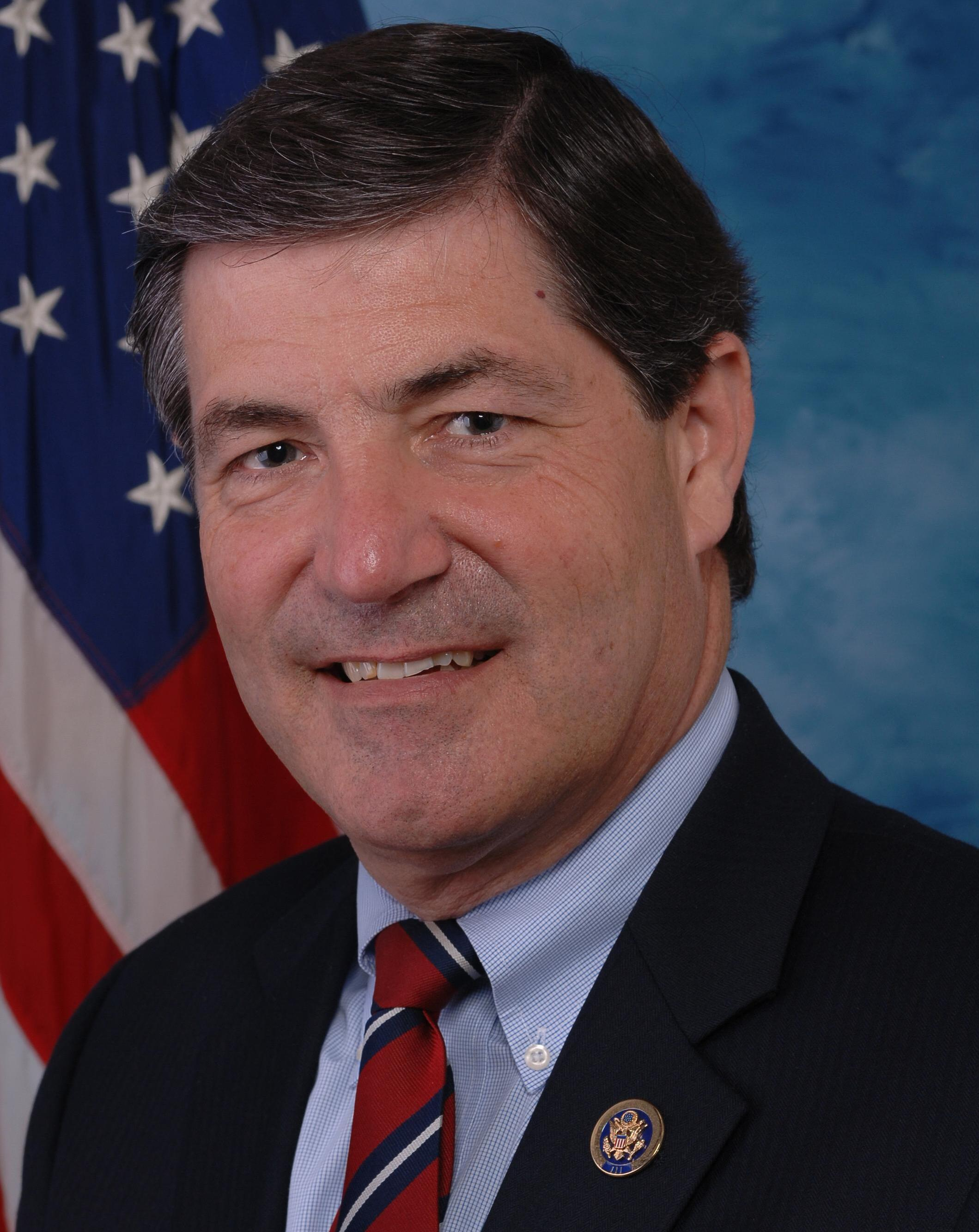

Nominee	Jim Gerlach	Bob Roggio
Party	Republican	Democratic
Popular vote	179,423	164,952
Percentage	52.10%	47.90%
- County results Gerlach: 50–60% 60–70% Roggio: 50–60%
U.S. representative before election
Jim Gerlach
Republican
Elected U.S. representative
Jim Gerlach
Republican

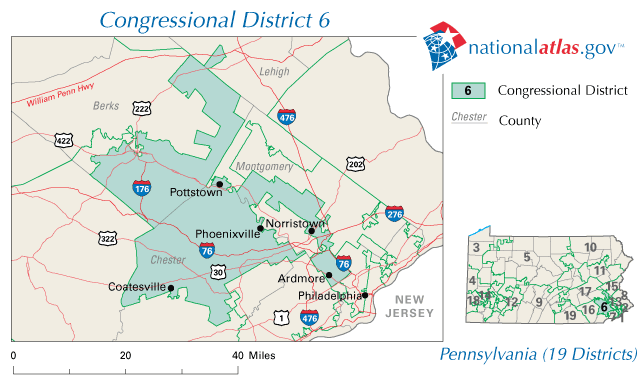

Three term Republican Jim Gerlach faced Democrat Bob Roggio (campaign website), a retired businessman from Charlestown who ran unopposed for the Democratic nomination both of his opponents dropped out of the race. Gerlach has become used to winning close elections, having survived threats from governor's assistant (and son of the former US Senator) Dan Wofford and attorney Lois Murphy in 2004 and 2006 with approximately 51% each year. The district is a classic swing district that went to John Kerry with 51% in 2004. However, Roggio did not have the name recognition nor the funding that Murphy had when waging her campaign, which made his candidacy more difficult than past challengers.

However, due to the tough environment in 2008 for Republicans, and the fact that Democrats outnumber Republicans this year for the first time in this district, the race was close. In addition, Gerlach has had some trouble shaking a connection to ousted Republican leader Tom Delay, who provided contributions to Gerlach through his PAC. However, Gerlach has a relatively moderate voting record and is seen as a tough campaigner who is knowledgeable in the suburban issues that are important in his district.

=== Democratic primary ===
==== Nominee ====
- Bob Roggio, retired businessman

==== Primary results ====
Democratic primary results
Party	Candidate	Votes	%
Democratic	Bob Roggio	82,540	100.00
Total votes		82,540	100.0

=== Republican primary ===
==== Nominee ====
- Jim Gerlach, incumbent U.S. Representative

==== Primary results ====
Republican primary results
Party	Candidate	Votes	%
Republican	Jim Gerlach (incumbent)	39,232	100.00
Total votes		39,232	100.00

=== Predictions ===
Source	Ranking	As of
The Cook Political Report	Likely R	November 6, 2008
Rothenberg	Safe R	November 2, 2008
Sabato's Crystal Ball	Lean R	November 6, 2008
Real Clear Politics	Safe R	November 7, 2008
CQ Politics	Likely R	November 6, 2008

=== General election ===
2008 Pennsylvania's 6th congressional district election
Party	Candidate	Votes	%
Republican	Jim Gerlach (incumbent)	179,423	52.10
Democratic	Bob Roggio	164,952	47.90
Total votes		344,375	100.00
Republican hold			

- Race ranking and details from CQ Politics
- Campaign contributions from OpenSecrets
- Gerlach (R-i) vs Roggio (D) graph of collected poll results from Pollster.com

== District 7 ==
2008 Pennsylvania's 7th congressional district election
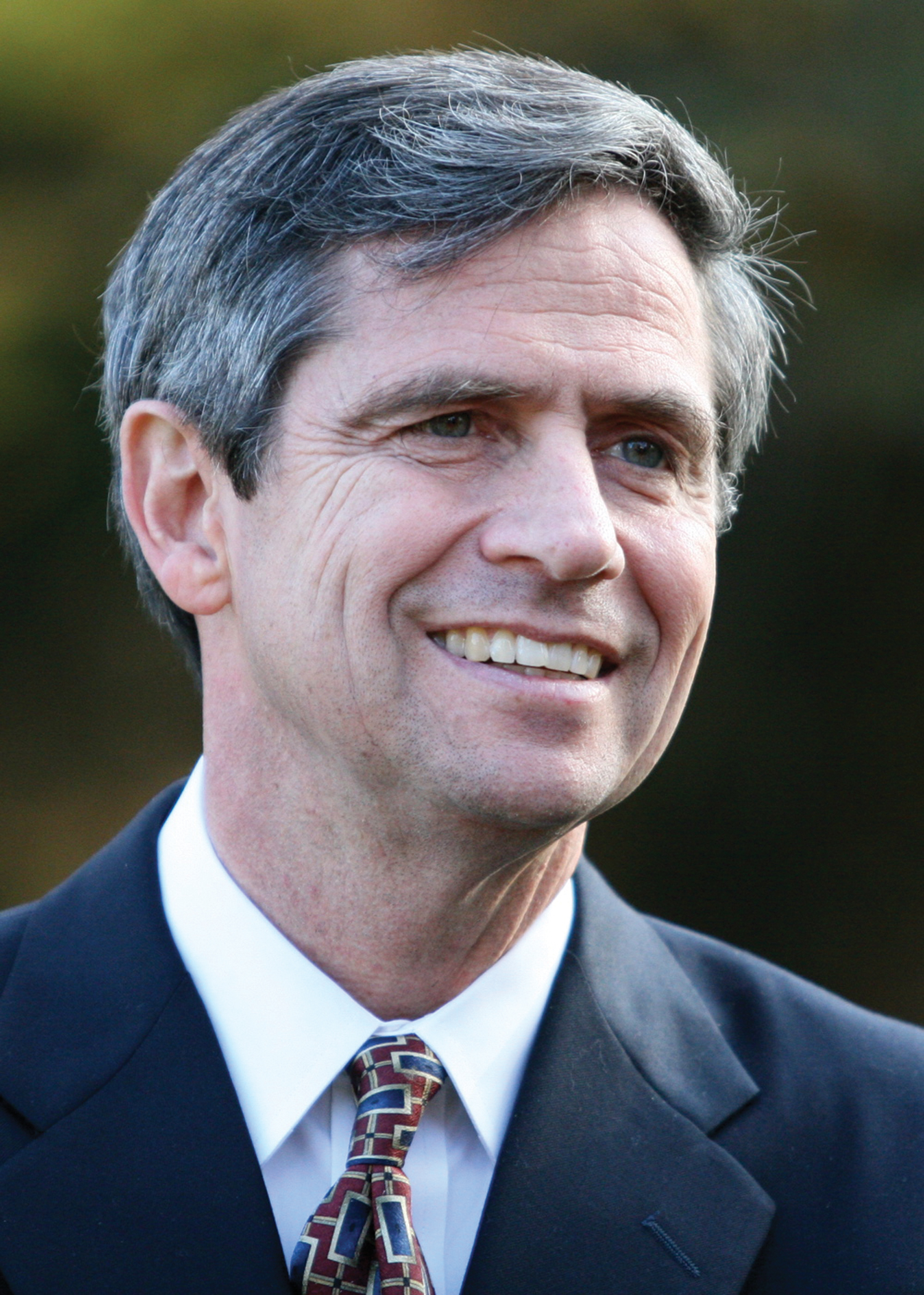

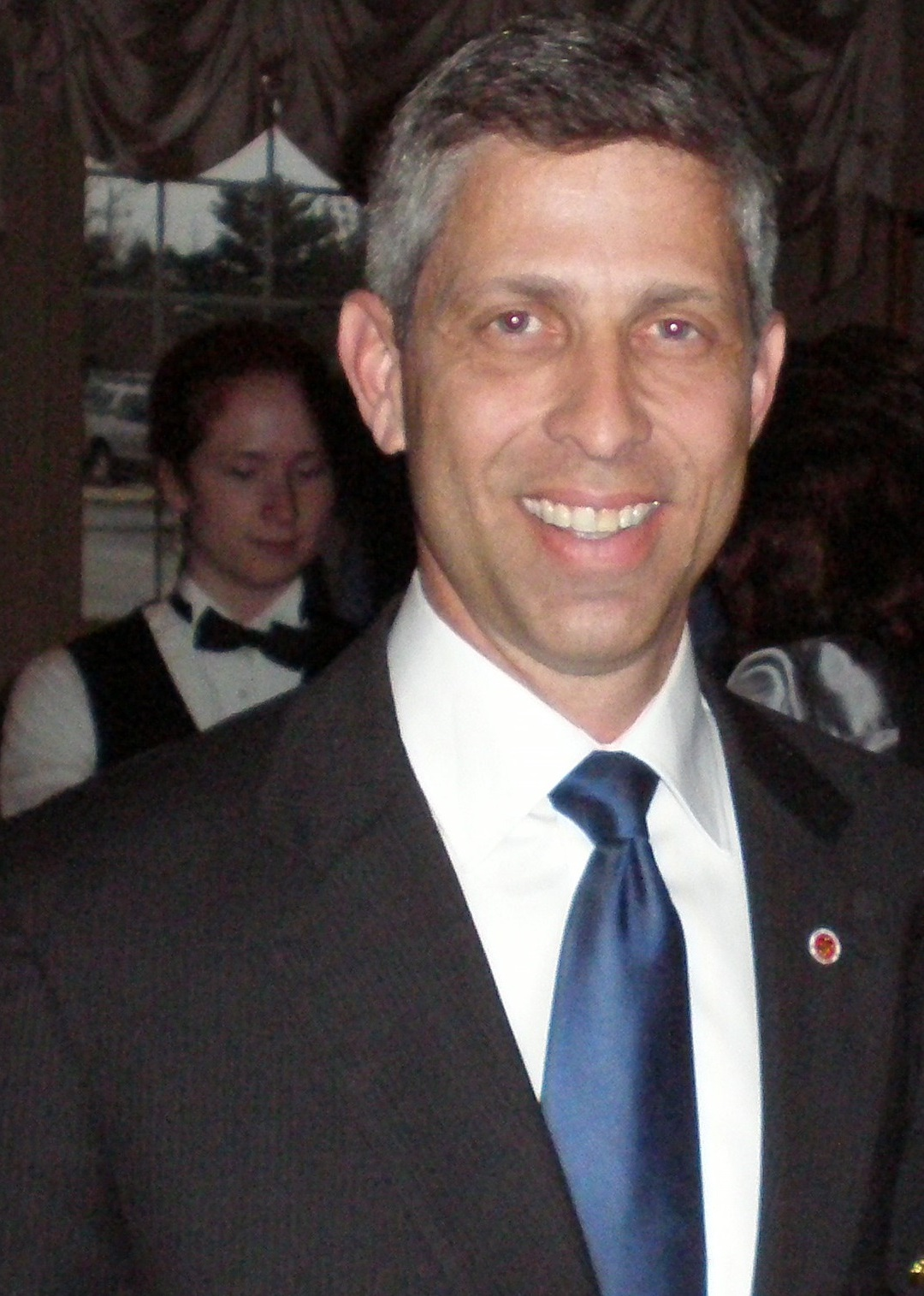
Nominee	Joe Sestak	Craig Williams
Party	Democratic	Republican
Popular vote	209,955	142,362
Percentage	59.59%	40.41%
- County results Sestak: 50–60% 60–70%
U.S. representative before election
Joe Sestak
Democratic
Elected U.S. representative
Joe Sestak
Democratic

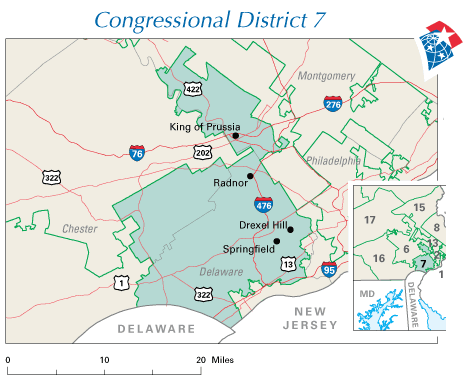

Incumbent Democratic Joe Sestak defeated Republican nominee Wendell Craig Williams, winning 59.6% of the vote. In 2006 Sestak defeated incumbent Curt Weldon, who was being investigated for misuse of campaign funds, by 56% to 44%. Sestak used his military credentials as a retired vice admiral to present himself as a strong leader and as an ethical alternative to a Republican Party that has faced scandal within his district. Because of his moderate voting record, reputation as a tireless worker, and military background, Sestak was expected to have a large advantage over any Republican opponent in 2008. The NRCC initially had trouble finding any top-tier candidates, and eventually settled on Iraq War veteran and attorney Craig Williams.

=== Democratic primary ===
==== Nominee ====
- Joe Sestak, incumbent U.S. Representative

==== Primary results ====
Democratic primary results
Party	Candidate	Votes	%
Democratic	Joe Sestak	91,272	100.00
Total votes		91,272	100.00

=== Republican primary ===
==== Nominee ====
- Wendell Craig Williams, federal prosecutor and assistant U.S. Attorney

==== Primary results ====
Republican primary results
Party	Candidate	Votes	%
Republican	Wendell Craig Williams	52,733	100.00
Total votes		52,733	100.00

=== Predictions ===
Source	Ranking	As of
The Cook Political Report	Safe D	November 6, 2008
Rothenberg	Safe D	November 2, 2008
Sabato's Crystal Ball	Safe D	November 6, 2008
Real Clear Politics	Safe D	November 7, 2008
CQ Politics	Safe D	November 6, 2008

=== General election ===
2008 Pennsylvania's 7th congressional district election
Party	Candidate	Votes	%
Democratic	Joe Sestak (incumbent)	209,955	59.59
Republican	Wendell Craig Williams	142,362	40.41
Total votes		352,317	100.00
Democratic hold			

- Campaign contributions from OpenSecrets

== District 8 ==
2008 Pennsylvania's 8th congressional district election
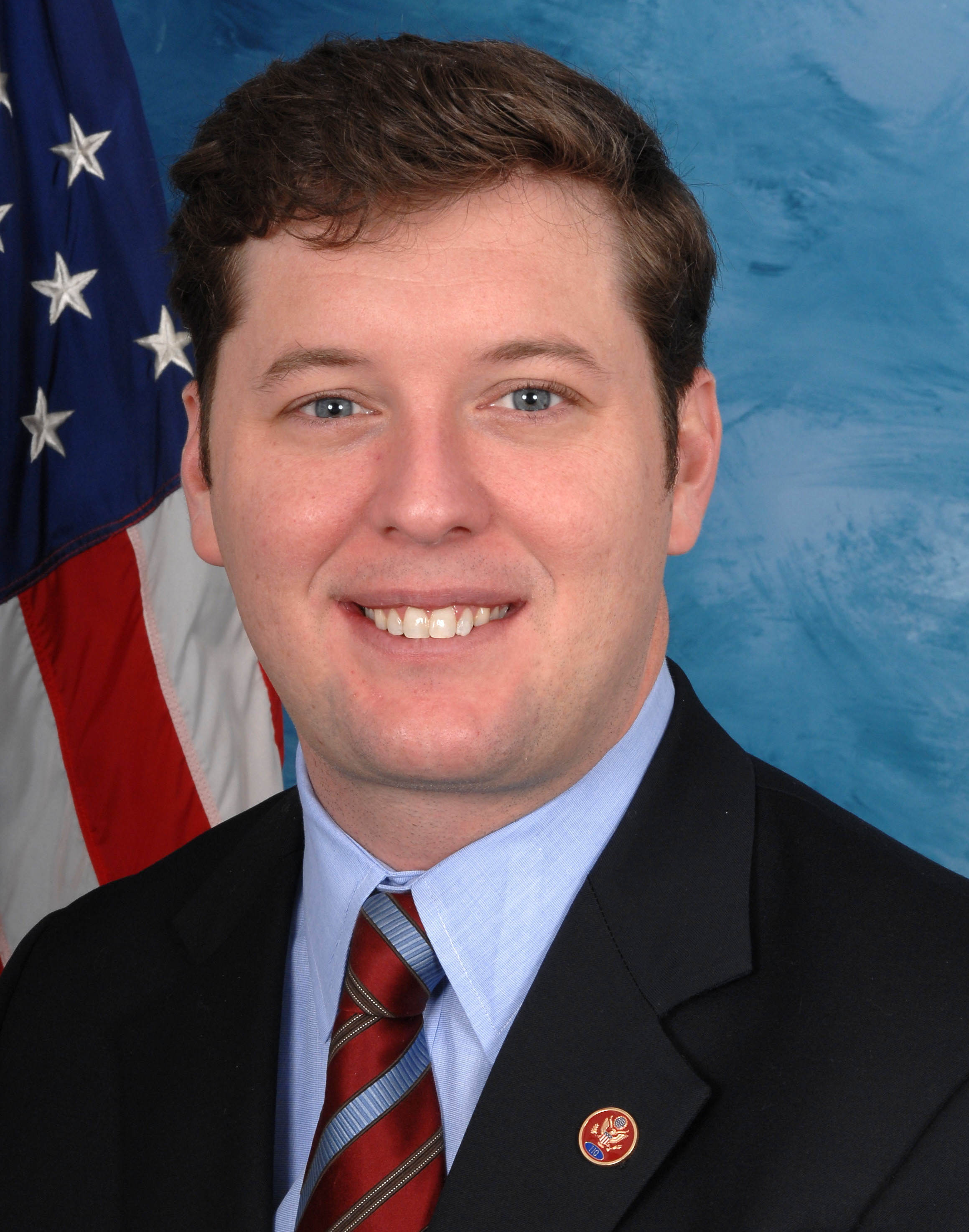

Nominee	Patrick Murphy	Tom Manion
Party	Democratic	Republican
Popular vote	197,869	145,103
Percentage	56.77%	41.63%
- County results Murphy: 50–60% 60–70%
U.S. representative before election
Patrick Murphy
Democratic
Elected U.S. representative
Patrick Murphy
Democratic

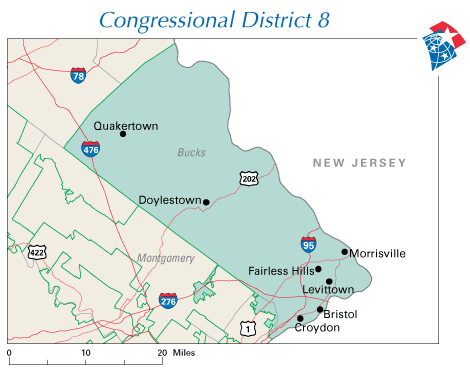

Democratic incumbent Patrick Murphy, an Iraq War veteran, won against Republican nominee Tom Manion, a businessman and retired Marine, and Independent Tom Lingenfelter.

Murphy narrowly won in 2006, when he unseated one-term Republican Mike Fitzpatrick by 1,518 votes. Manion, a retired Marine Colonel and executive at Johnson and Johnson, ran unopposed in the Republican primary in April. Significant national attention has been drawn to the race because of the Iraq War connections of both candidates. Murphy is a veteran and a strong critic of the war, while Manion, whose son, 1st Lt. Travis Manion, was killed in Iraq in April 2007, supports the war. This district contains Bucks County and a small part of Northern Philadelphia and Montgomery County. Once considered a safe Republican district, it has recently been trending more Democratic. Registered Democrats narrowly outnumber registered Republicans as of August 2008, due in large part to voter registration drives connected with the Democratic presidential primary in Pennsylvania.

=== Democratic primary ===
==== Nominee ====
- Patrick Murphy, incumbent U.S. Representative

==== Primary results ====
Democratic primary results
Party	Candidate	Votes	%
Democratic	Patrick Murphy (incumbent)	100,788	100.00
Total votes		100,788	100.00

=== Republican primary ===
==== Nominee ====
- Tom Manion, businessman and retired United States Marine

==== Primary results ====
Republican primary results
Party	Candidate	Votes	%
Republican	Tom Manion	35,610	100.00
Total votes		35,610	100.00

=== Predictions ===
Source	Ranking	As of
The Cook Political Report	Safe D	November 6, 2008
Rothenberg	Safe D	November 2, 2008
Sabato's Crystal Ball	Lean D	November 6, 2008
Real Clear Politics	Safe D	November 7, 2008
CQ Politics	Likely D	November 6, 2008

=== General election ===
2008 Pennsylvania's 8th congressional district election
Party	Candidate	Votes	%
Democratic	Patrick Murphy (incumbent)	197,869	56.77
Republican	Tom Manion	145,103	41.63
Independent	Tom Lingenfelter	5,543	1.59
Total votes		348,515	100.00
Democratic hold			

- Race ranking and details from CQ Politics
- Campaign contributions from OpenSecrets

== District 9 ==
2008 Pennsylvania's 9th congressional district election
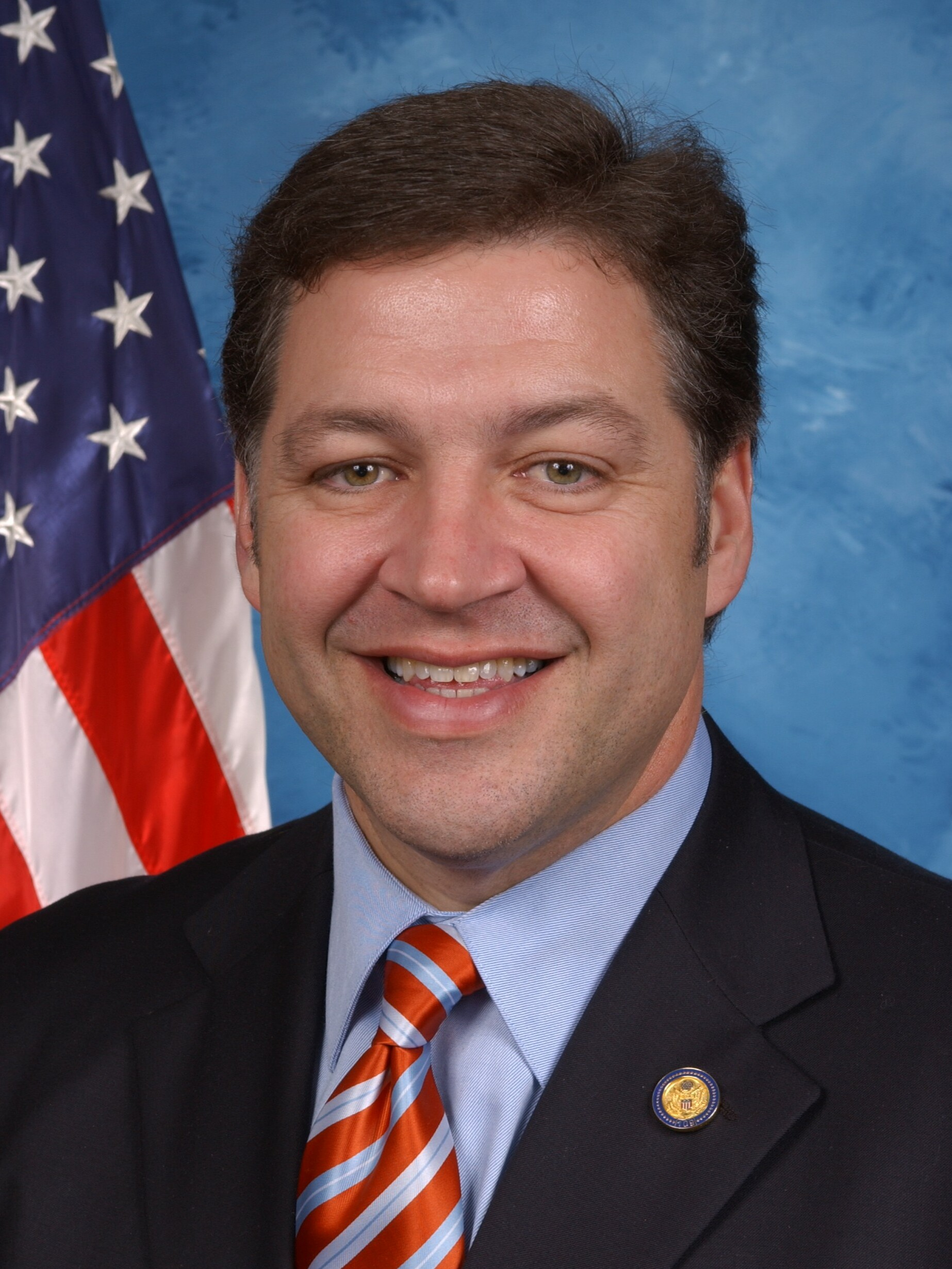

Nominee	Bill Shuster	Tony Barr
Party	Republican	Democratic
Popular vote	174,951	98,735
Percentage	63.92%	36.08%
- County results Shuster: 50–60% 60–70% 70–80%
U.S. representative before election
Bill Shuster
Republican
Elected U.S. representative
Bill Shuster
Republican

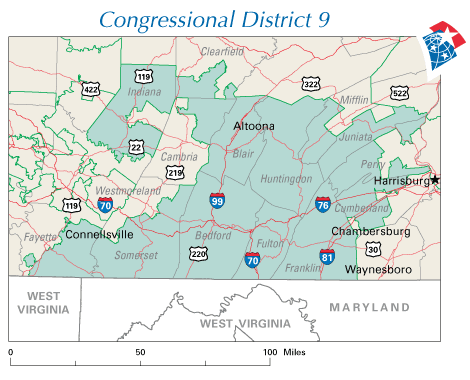

Three term Bill Shuster (R) won re-election with 64% of the vote. Shuster won 60.3% of the vote in 2006; George W. Bush carried the district with over 67% in 2004. Shuster also held the advantage of name recognition, as he is the son of a powerful congressman. The district is also the most Republican in Pennsylvania, further giving Shuster an advantage. His Democratic opponent was again 2006 candidate educator Tony Barr (campaign website).

=== Democratic primary ===
==== Nominee ====
- Tony Barr, 2006 Democratic nominee

==== Primary results ====
Republican primary results
Party	Candidate	Votes	%
Democratic	Tony Barr	58,522	100.00
Total votes		58,522	100.00

=== Republican primary ===
==== Nominee ====
- Bill Shuster, incumbent U.S. Representative

==== Primary results ====
Republican primary results
Party	Candidate	Votes	%
Republican	Bill Shuster (incumbent)	57,890	100.00
Total votes		57,890	100.00

=== Predictions ===
Source	Ranking	As of
The Cook Political Report	Safe R	November 6, 2008
Rothenberg	Safe R	November 2, 2008
Sabato's Crystal Ball	Safe R	November 6, 2008
Real Clear Politics	Safe R	November 7, 2008
CQ Politics	Safe R	November 6, 2008

=== General election ===
2008 Pennsylvania's 9th congressional district election
Party	Candidate	Votes	%
Republican	Bill Shuster (incumbent)	174,951	63.92
Democratic	Tony Barr	98,735	36.08
Total votes		273,686	100.00
Republican hold			

- Race ranking and details from CQ Politics
- Campaign contributions from OpenSecrets

== District 10 ==
2008 Pennsylvania's 10th congressional district election
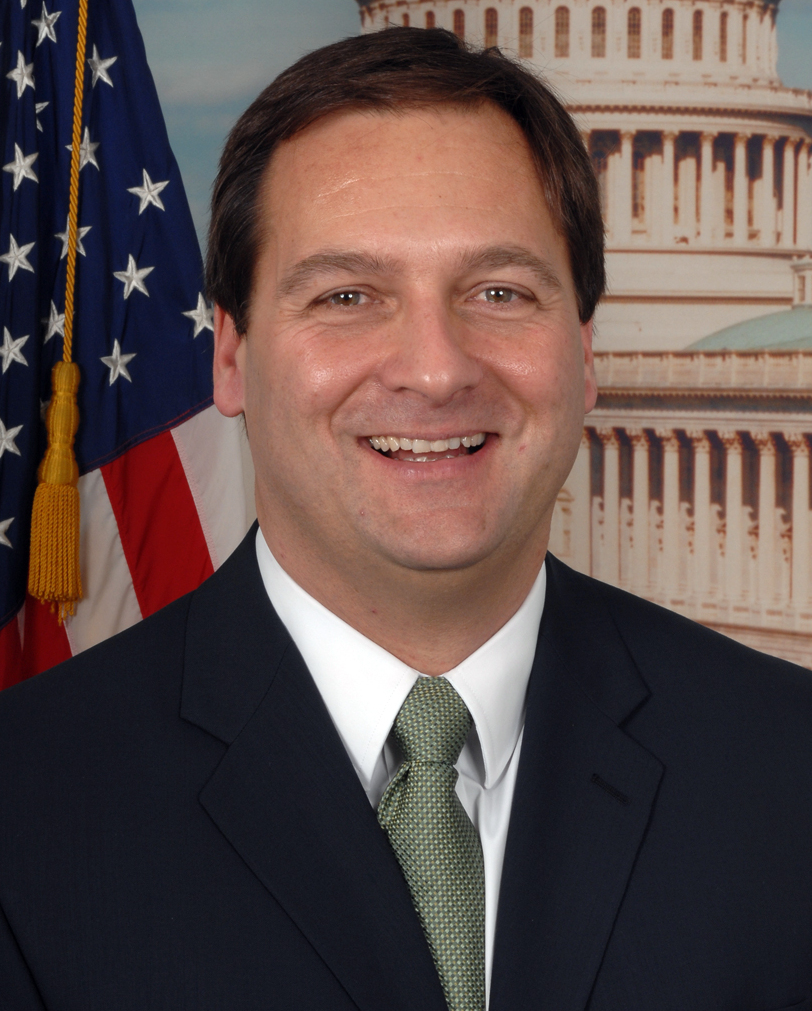

Nominee	Chris Carney	Chris Hackett
Party	Democratic	Republican
Popular vote	160,837	124,681
Percentage	56.33%	43.67%
- County results Carney: 50–60% 60–70% Hackett: 50–60%
U.S. Representative before election
Chris Carney
Democratic
Elected U.S. Representative
Chris Carney
Democratic

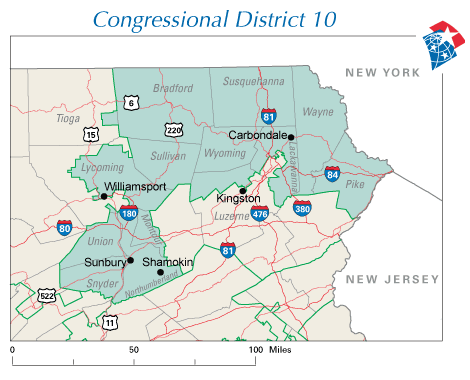

Democratic incumbent Chris Carney defeated Republican staffing company executive Chris Hackett by a margin of 56% to 44%. CQ Politics forecasted the race as 'Leans Democratic' prior to Carney's victory. The win on the part of the Democratic congressman coincided with John McCain winning 54 percent of the vote in the district as opposed to Democrat Barack Obama's 46 percent.

Carney was initially thought to have been facing a difficult reelection bid in this heavily Republican district, which he won after widely publicized allegations of incumbent Republican Don Sherwood's extramarital affair with and alleged abuse of Cynthia Ore. Carney defeated Sherwood 53% to 47%. However, President George W. Bush won the 10th District 60% to 40% in 2004.

Two Republicans fought for the nomination: staffing company executive Chris Hackett, who gained the endorsement of conservative organizations and manufacturing executive Dan Meuser, who has credibility as a disabled rights activist. While battling for the nomination, Meuser accused Hackett of wavering on his pro-life stance, while Hackett painted Meuser as associated with unpopular politicians. Hackett won a tough primary with 52% of the vote, which drained many of his resources for the general election.

Carney, throughout the general election, was the favorite to retain his seat but the vote was expected to be somewhat close. The traditionally Republican leanings of the district were advantageous for Hackett, but Pennsylvania as a whole has been trending Democratic recently, having voted for the Democratic nominee for president in every election since 1992. The state ultimately backed Obama that year by a ten-point margin. Carney also has a strong military background and used his membership in the Blue Dog Coalition, a group of moderate Democrats that promote compromise, as a boost. Carney easily beat Hackett by a twelve-point margin and was aided by a stronger than anticipated vote for the national Democratic presidential ticket in the district. Whereas John Kerry and John Edwards in 2004 received merely 40 percent of the vote in the 10th district, Barack Obama and Joe Biden received 46 percent of the vote.

=== Democratic primary ===
==== Nominee ====
- Chris Carney, incumbent U.S. Representative

==== Primary results ====
Democratic primary results
Party	Candidate	Votes	%
Democratic	Chris Carney (incumbent)	71,988	100.00
Total votes		71,988	100.00

=== Republican primary ===
==== Nominee ====
- Chris Hackett, staffing company executive

==== Eliminated in primary ====
- Dan Meuser, manufacturing executive

==== Primary results ====
Republican primary results
Party	Candidate	Votes	%
Republican	Chris Hackett	34,129	52.32
Republican	Dan Meuser	31,102	47.68
Total votes		65,231	100.00

=== Predictions ===
Source	Ranking	As of
The Cook Political Report	Lean D	November 6, 2008
Rothenberg	Likely D	November 2, 2008
Sabato's Crystal Ball	Lean D	November 6, 2008
Real Clear Politics	Tossup	November 7, 2008
CQ Politics	Lean D	November 6, 2008

=== General election ===
2008 Pennsylvania's 10th congressional district election
Party	Candidate	Votes	%
Democratic	Chris Carney (incumbent)	160,837	56.33
Republican	Chris Hackett	124,681	43.67
Total votes		285,518	100.00
Democratic hold			

- Race ranking and details from CQ Politics
- Campaign contributions from OpenSecrets
- Hackett (R) vs Carney (D-i) graph of collected poll results from Pollster.com

== District 11 ==
2008 Pennsylvania's 11th congressional district election
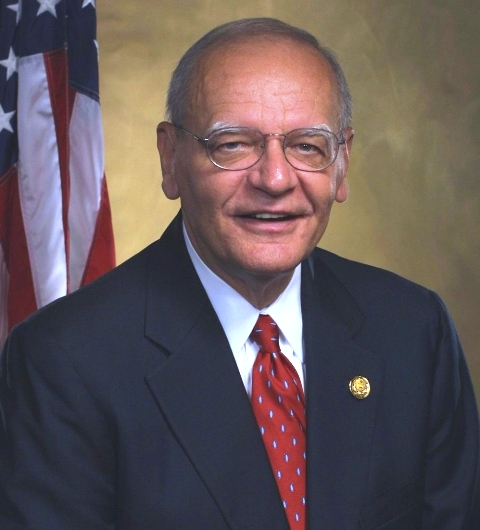

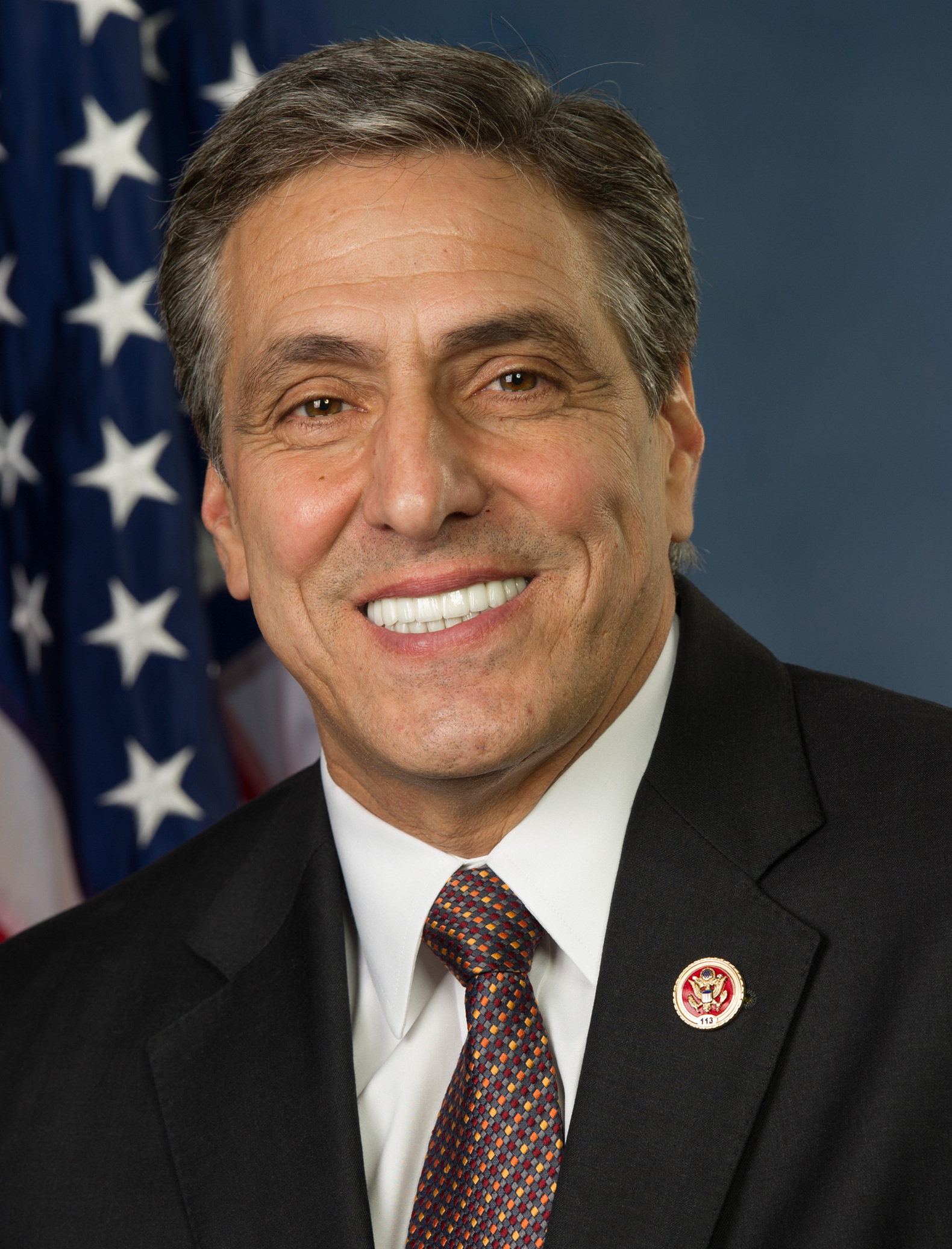
Nominee	Paul Kanjorski	Lou Barletta
Party	Democratic	Republican
Popular vote	146,379	137,151
Percentage	51.63%	48.37%
- County results Kanjorski: 50–60% 60–70% Barletta: 50–60%
U.S. representative before election
Paul Kanjorski
Democratic
Elected U.S. representative
Paul Kanjorski
Democratic

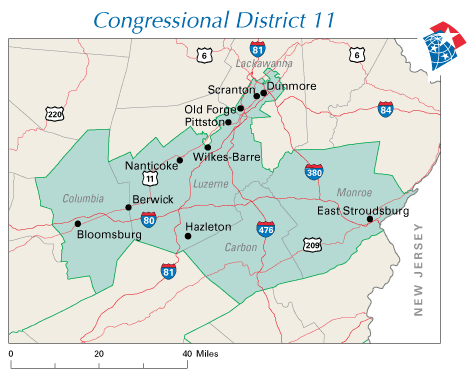

Twelve term Democratic incumbent Paul Kanjorski (D) was challenged by Republican Lou Barletta, the mayor of Hazleton. Kanjorksi generally won reelection easily, considering the Democratic leanings of the district. John Kerry won this district in 2004 with 52% and Kanjorski was reelected with 72.5% of the vote in 2006. However, he faced one of the toughest elections of his career against Barletta, a figure who made the national spotlight for the anti-illegal immigration policies he promoted as mayor. He was unopposed for the Republican nomination and has national name recognition for his stance which may have helped or hurt him with different voting groups in the election. Kanjorksi came under scrutiny for several comments he has made during the recent Congress, including his quote that the Democrats stretched the facts on the Iraq War to provide a bigger advantage during the 2006 election cycle.

=== Democratic primary ===
==== Nominee ====
- Paul Kanjorski, incumbent U.S. Representative

==== Primary results ====
Democratic primary results
Party	Candidate	Votes	%
Democratic	Paul Kanjorski (incumbent)	93,120	100.00
Total votes		93,120	100.00

=== Republican primary ===
==== Nominee ====
- Lou Barletta, mayor of Hazleton

==== Primary results ====
Republican primary results
Party	Candidate	Votes	%
Republican	Lou Barletta	27,710	100.00
Total votes		27,710	100.00

=== Predictions ===
Source	Ranking	As of
The Cook Political Report	Tossup	November 6, 2008
Rothenberg	Tossup	November 2, 2008
Sabato's Crystal Ball	Lean R (flip)	November 6, 2008
Real Clear Politics	Lean R (flip)	November 7, 2008
CQ Politics	Tossup	November 6, 2008

=== General election ===
2008 Pennsylvania's 11th congressional district election
Party	Candidate	Votes	%
Democratic	Paul Kanjorski (incumbent)	146,379	51.63
Republican	Lou Barletta	137,151	48.37
Total votes		283,530	100.00
Democratic hold			

- Race ranking and details from CQ Politics
- Campaign contributions from OpenSecrets
- Barletta (R) vs Kanjorski (D-i) graph of collected poll results from Pollster.com

== District 12 ==
2008 Pennsylvania's 12th congressional district election
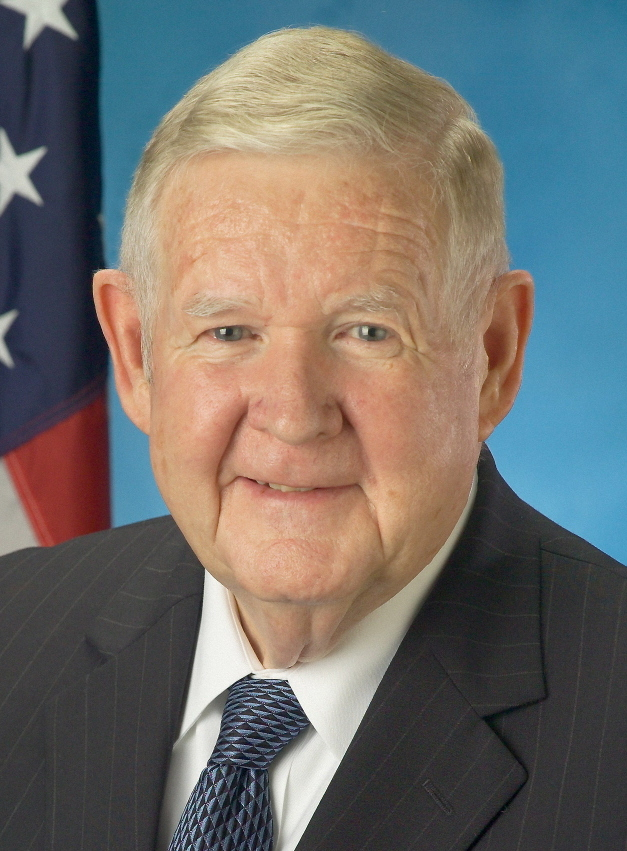

Nominee	John Murtha	William Russell
Party	Democratic	Republican
Popular vote	155,267	113,120
Percentage	57.85%	42.15%
- County results Murtha: 50–60% 60–70% Russell: 50–60%
U.S. representative before election
John Murtha
Democratic
Elected U.S. representative
John Murtha
Democratic

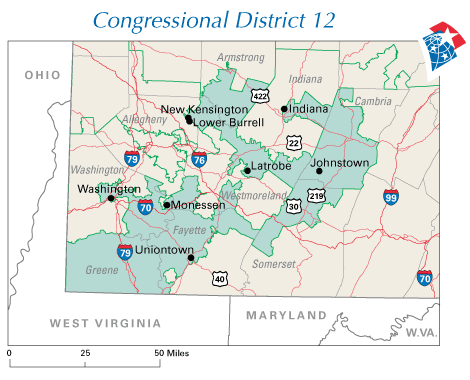

Sixteen term incumbent John Murtha (D) ran against Retired Lieutenant Colonel William Russell (R), who won the Republican nomination after staging a successful write-in campaign. CQ Politics forecasts the race as 'Safe Democrat,' but the race tightened after Murtha made well-publicized comments referring to Western Pennsylvania as a "racist" and "redneck" area. Murtha's comments were spoofed in the October 25, 2008 episode of Saturday Night Live in a segment entitled "Sen. Biden and Rep. Murtha Say Crazy Things in Johnstown, Pa." By October, Russell out-raised and outspent Murtha for a whole week. The district had a Cook Partisan Voting Index score of R+1.

=== Democratic primary ===
==== Nominee ====
- John Murtha, incumbent U.S. Representative

==== Primary results ====
Democratic primary results
Party	Candidate	Votes	%
Democratic	John Murtha (incumbent)	112,082	100.00
Total votes		112,082	100.00

=== Predictions ===
Source	Ranking	As of
The Cook Political Report	Lean D	November 6, 2008
Rothenberg	Likely D	November 2, 2008
Sabato's Crystal Ball	Lean D	November 6, 2008
Real Clear Politics	Lean D	November 7, 2008
CQ Politics	Lean D	November 6, 2008

=== General election ===
2008 Pennsylvania's 12th congressional district election
Party	Candidate	Votes	%
Democratic	John Murtha (incumbent)	155,268	57.85
Republican	William Russell	113,120	42.15
Total votes		268,388	100.00
Democratic hold			

- Race ranking and details from CQ Politics
- Campaign contributions from OpenSecrets

== District 13 ==
2008 Pennsylvania's 13th congressional district election
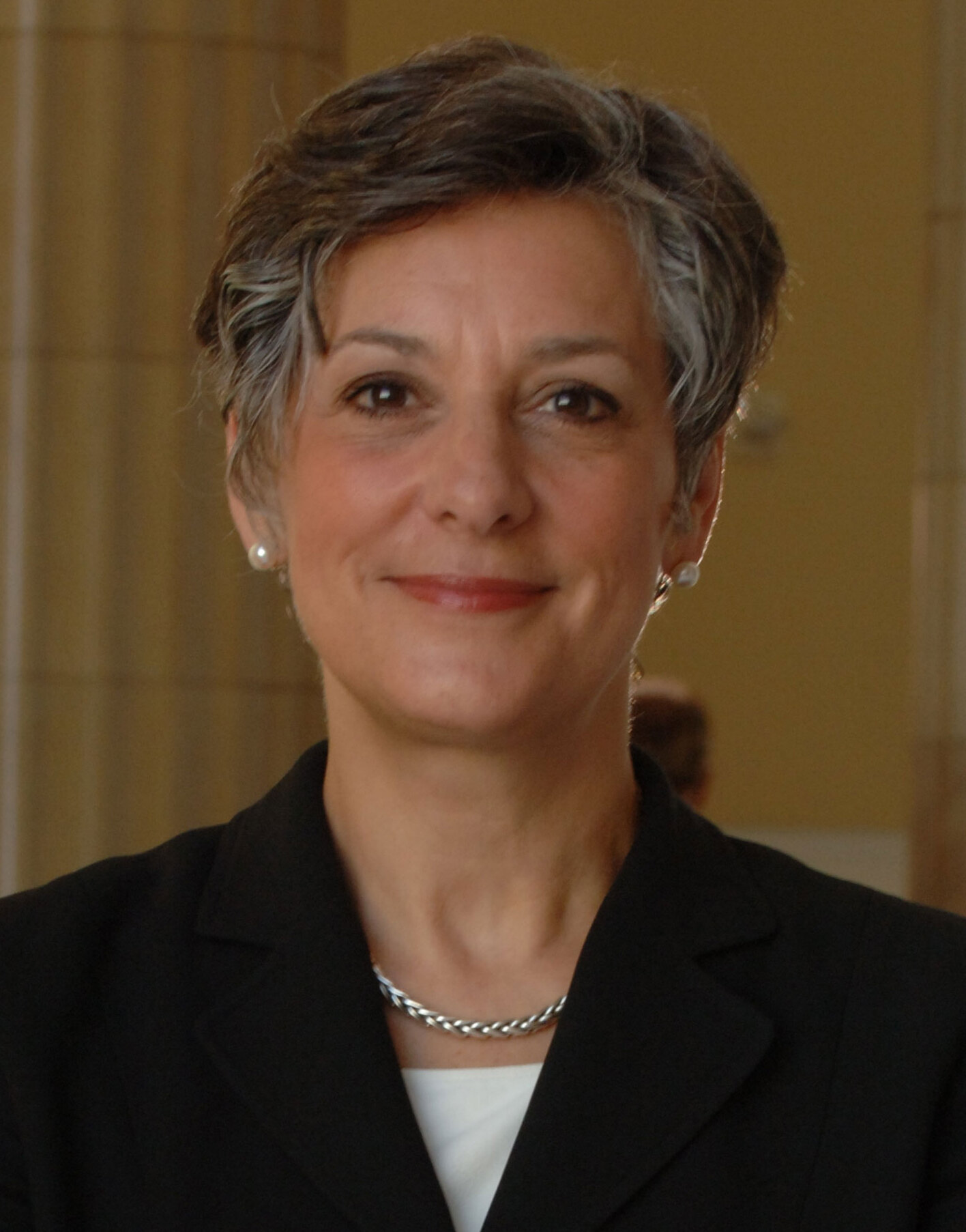

Nominee	Allyson Schwartz	Marina Kats
Party	Democratic	Republican
Popular vote	196,868	108,271
Percentage	62.79%	34.53%
- County results Schwartz: 50–60% 60–70%
U.S. representative before election
Allyson Schwartz
Democratic
Elected U.S. representative
Allyson Schwartz
Democratic

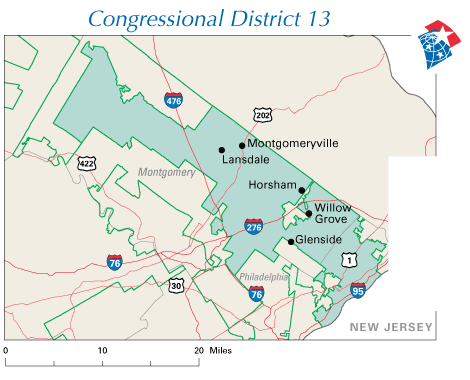

While two term Democrat Allyson Schwartz was a target for Republicans in the 2008 race, her seat was expected to be relatively safe. She did not face a serious challenge in 2006 against Raj Bhakta in this Democratic-leaning district. 2007 Philadelphia mayoral candidate Al Taubenberger and state Senator Stewart Greenleaf pondered running on the Republican ticket, but did not enter the race. Attorney Marina Kats ran unopposed for the Republican nomination. Kats was underfunded and without name recognition, while running against and incumbent with a deep warchest of funds, which presented a crucial advantage in an expensive media market. This seat was considered to be noncompetitive.

=== Democratic primary ===
==== Nominee ====
- Allyson Schwartz, incumbent U.S. Representative

==== Primary results ====
Democratic primary results
Party	Candidate	Votes	%
Democratic	Allyson Schwartz (incumbent)	44,402	100.00
Total votes		44,402	100.00

=== Republican primary ===
==== Nominee ====
- Marina Kats, attorney

==== Primary results ====
Republican primary results
Party	Candidate	Votes	%
Republican	Marina Kats	27,169	100.00
Total votes		27,169	100.00

=== Predictions ===
Source	Ranking	As of
The Cook Political Report	Safe D	November 6, 2008
Rothenberg	Safe D	November 2, 2008
Sabato's Crystal Ball	Safe D	November 6, 2008
Real Clear Politics	Safe D	November 7, 2008
CQ Politics	Safe D	November 6, 2008

=== General election ===
2008 Pennsylvania's 13th congressional district election
Party	Candidate	Votes	%
Democratic	Allyson Schwartz (incumbent)	196,868	62.79
Republican	Marina Kats	108,271	34.53
Constitution	John McDermott	8,374	2.67
Total votes		313,513	100.00
Democratic hold			

- Race ranking and details from CQ Politics
- Campaign contributions from OpenSecrets

== District 14 ==
2008 Pennsylvania's 14th congressional district election
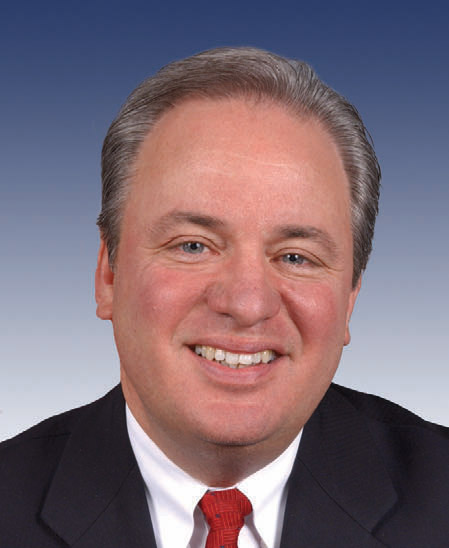

Nominee	Mike Doyle	Titus North
Party	Democratic	Green
Popular vote	242,326	23,214
Percentage	91.26%	8.74%
- County results Doyle: 90–100%
U.S. representative before election
Mike Doyle
Democratic
Elected U.S. representative
Mike Doyle
Democratic

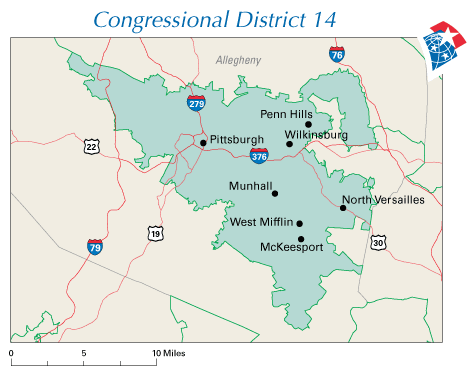

Seven term incumbent Mike Doyle (D) ran for another term. For the fourth straight election, Doyle did not face a Republican opponent, although Green Party candidate, professor Titus North, was on the ballot for the second straight year. Doyle represented a district that gave John Kerry 69% of the vote in 2004 and his seat was considered to be noncompetitive. The congressman presented a strongly pro-union image, while avoiding hot button social issues, which allowed him to remain popular and noncontroversial.

=== Democratic primary ===
==== Nominee ====
- Mike Doyle, incumbent U.S. Representative

==== Primary results ====
Democratic primary results
Party	Candidate	Votes	%
Democratic	Mike Doyle (incumbent)	134,298	100.00
Total votes		134,298	100.00

=== Predictions ===
Source	Ranking	As of
The Cook Political Report	Safe D	November 6, 2008
Rothenberg	Safe D	November 2, 2008
Sabato's Crystal Ball	Safe D	November 6, 2008
Real Clear Politics	Safe D	November 7, 2008
CQ Politics	Safe D	November 6, 2008

=== General election ===
2008 Pennsylvania's 14th congressional district election
Party	Candidate	Votes	%
Democratic	Mike Doyle (incumbent)	242,326	91.26
Green	Titus North	23,214	8.74
Total votes		265,540	100.00
Democratic hold			

- Race ranking and details from CQ Politics
- Campaign contributions from OpenSecrets

== District 15 ==
2008 Pennsylvania's 15th congressional district election
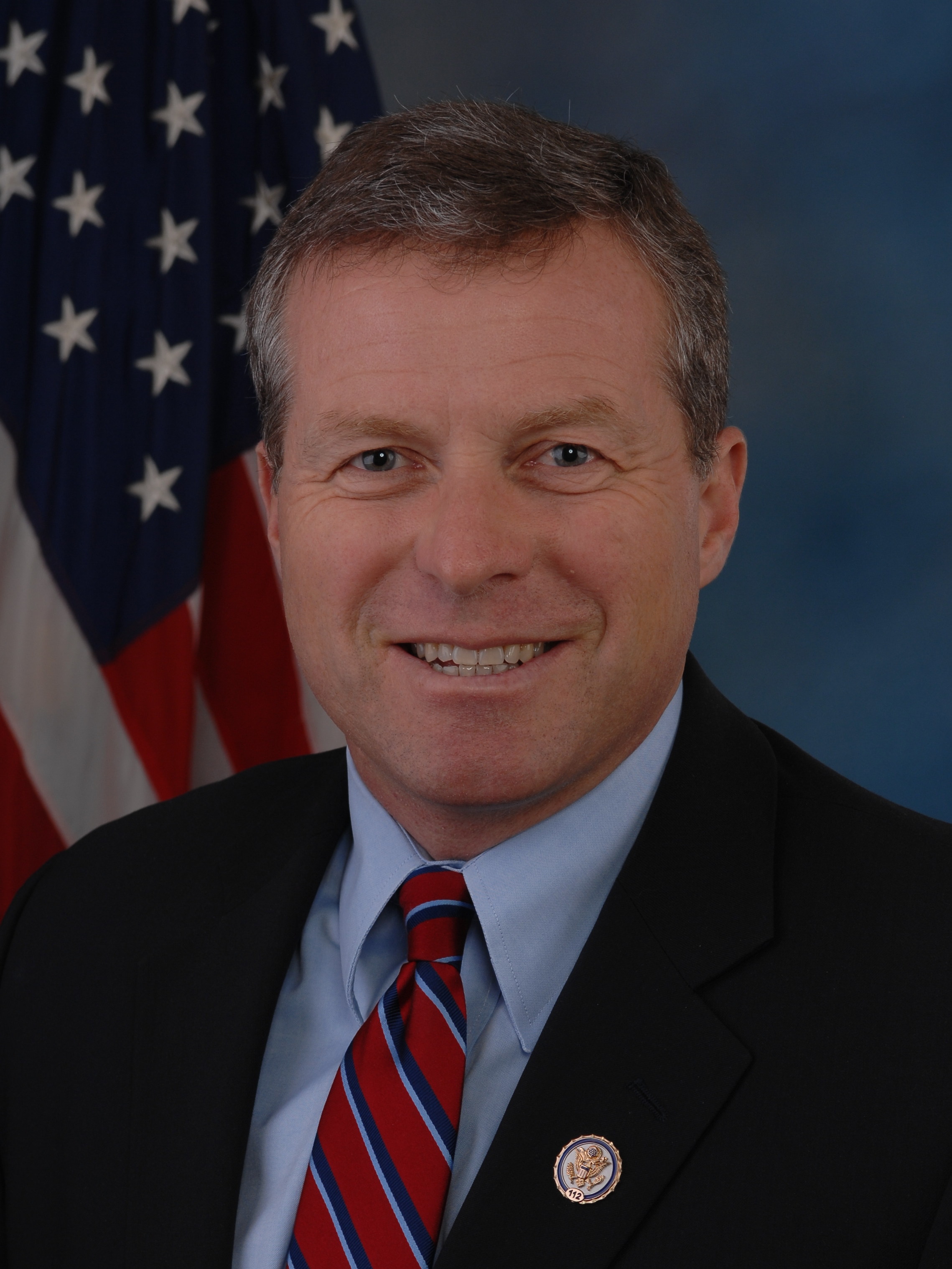

Nominee	Charlie Dent	Sam Bennett
Party	Republican	Democratic
Popular vote	181,433	128,333
Percentage	58.57%	41.43%
- County results Dent: 50–60% 60–70%
U.S. representative before election
Charlie Dent
Republican
Elected U.S. representative
Charlie Dent
Republican

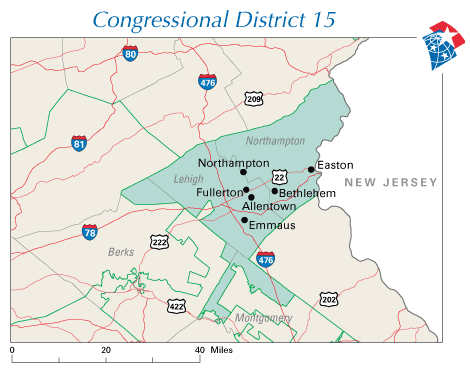

Republican incumbent Charlie Dent was challenged by Allentown Democratic Party Chair Sam Bennett. Although Dent was targeted by the Democrats for a tough race in 2006, his seat was ultimately relatively safe in 2008. In 2004, he won only 53% of the vote against a political newcomer with no political experience, but did significantly better in his bid for a second term. His district covers the Lehigh Valley region and is politically marginal, narrowly going to John Kerry with 50% of the vote in 2004.

Lehigh County Executive Don Cunningham, and state Democratic Party Chairman T.J. Rooney declined to run for the Democratic nomination, leaving Sam Bennett as the sole member of her party's ticket. Bennett was not considered to be as strong of a candidate as Democrats would like, which helped this seat fall out of contention. Although Democrats have an advantage in registration in the district and that Pennsylvania as a whole is trending Democratic, Dent projects a moderate image. His relationship with popular liberal then-Republican Arlen Specter also aids Dent.

=== Democratic primary ===
==== Nominee ====
- Sam Bennett, Allentown Democratic Party chair

==== Primary results ====
Democratic primary results
Party	Candidate	Votes	%
Democratic	Sam Bennett	73,734	100.00
Total votes		73,734	100.00

=== Republican primary ===
==== Nominee ====
- Charlie Dent, incumbent U.S. Representative

==== Primary results ====
Republican primary results
Party	Candidate	Votes	%
Republican	Charlie Dent (incumbent)	27,875	100.00
Total votes		27,875	100.00

=== Predictions ===
Source	Ranking	As of
The Cook Political Report	Likely R	November 6, 2008
Rothenberg	Safe R	November 2, 2008
Sabato's Crystal Ball	Lean R	November 6, 2008
Real Clear Politics	Safe R	November 7, 2008
CQ Politics	Likely R	November 6, 2008

=== General election ===
2008 Pennsylvania's 15th congressional district election
Party	Candidate	Votes	%
Republican	Charlie Dent (incumbent)	181,433	58.57
Democratic	Sam Bennett	128,333	41.43
Total votes		309,766	100.00
Republican hold			

- Race ranking and details from CQ Politics
- Campaign contributions from OpenSecrets

== District 16 ==
2008 Pennsylvania's 16th congressional district election
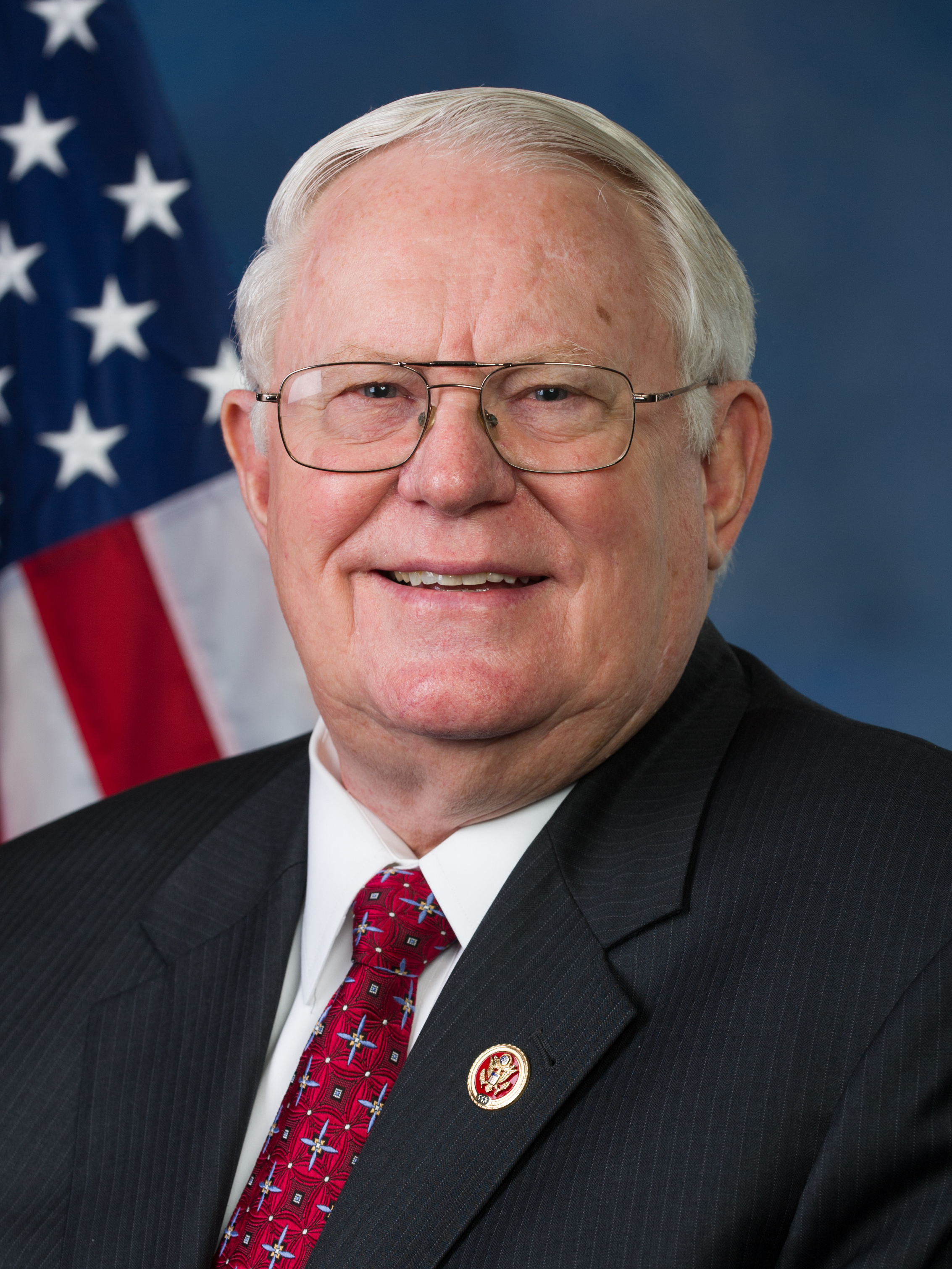

Nominee	Joe Pitts	Bruce Slater
Party	Republican	Democratic
Popular vote	170,329	120,193
Percentage	55.82%	39.39%
- County results Pitts: 50–60% Slater: 60–70%
U.S. representative before election
Joe Pitts
Republican
Elected U.S. representative
Joe Pitts
Republican

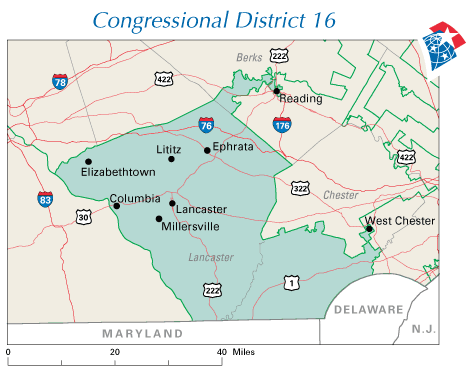

Six-term Republican incumbent Joe Pitts ran for reelection against Democratic nominee Bruce Slater (campaign website), a U.S. Navy veteran, historic restoration contractor, democratic committee person and community activist who ran unopposed in the primary. Green Party candidate John Murphy, a management consultant and Constitution Party candidate Dan Frank (campaign website) were also on the ballot. Pitts had the worst showing of his congressional career in 2008, winning 55.8% of the vote. However, he represents a historically conservative district which gave 61% of its votes to George W. Bush in 2004, and has not attracted a top-tier Democratic challenger.

=== Democratic primary ===
==== Nominee ====
- Bruce Slater, U.S. Navy veteran and building contractor

==== Primary results ====
Democratic primary results
Party	Candidate	Votes	%
Democratic	Bruce Slater	59,246	100.00
Total votes		59,246	100.00

=== Republican primary ===
==== Nominee ====
- Joe Pitts, incumbent U.S. Representative

==== Primary results ====
Republican primary results
Party	Candidate	Votes	%
Republican	Joe Pitts (incumbent)	49,740	100.00
Total votes		49,740	100.00

=== Predictions ===
Source	Ranking	As of
The Cook Political Report	Safe R	November 6, 2008
Rothenberg	Safe R	November 2, 2008
Sabato's Crystal Ball	Safe R	November 6, 2008
Real Clear Politics	Safe R	November 7, 2008
CQ Politics	Safe R	November 6, 2008

=== General election ===
2008 Pennsylvania's 16th congressional district election
Party	Candidate	Votes	%
Republican	Joe Pitts (incumbent)	170,329	55.82
Democratic	Bruce Slater	120,193	39.39
Green	John Murphy	11,768	3.86
Constitution	Dan Frank	2,877	0.94
Total votes		305,167	100.00
Republican hold			

- Race ranking and details from CQ Politics
- Campaign contributions from OpenSecrets

== District 17 ==
2008 Pennsylvania's 17th congressional district election
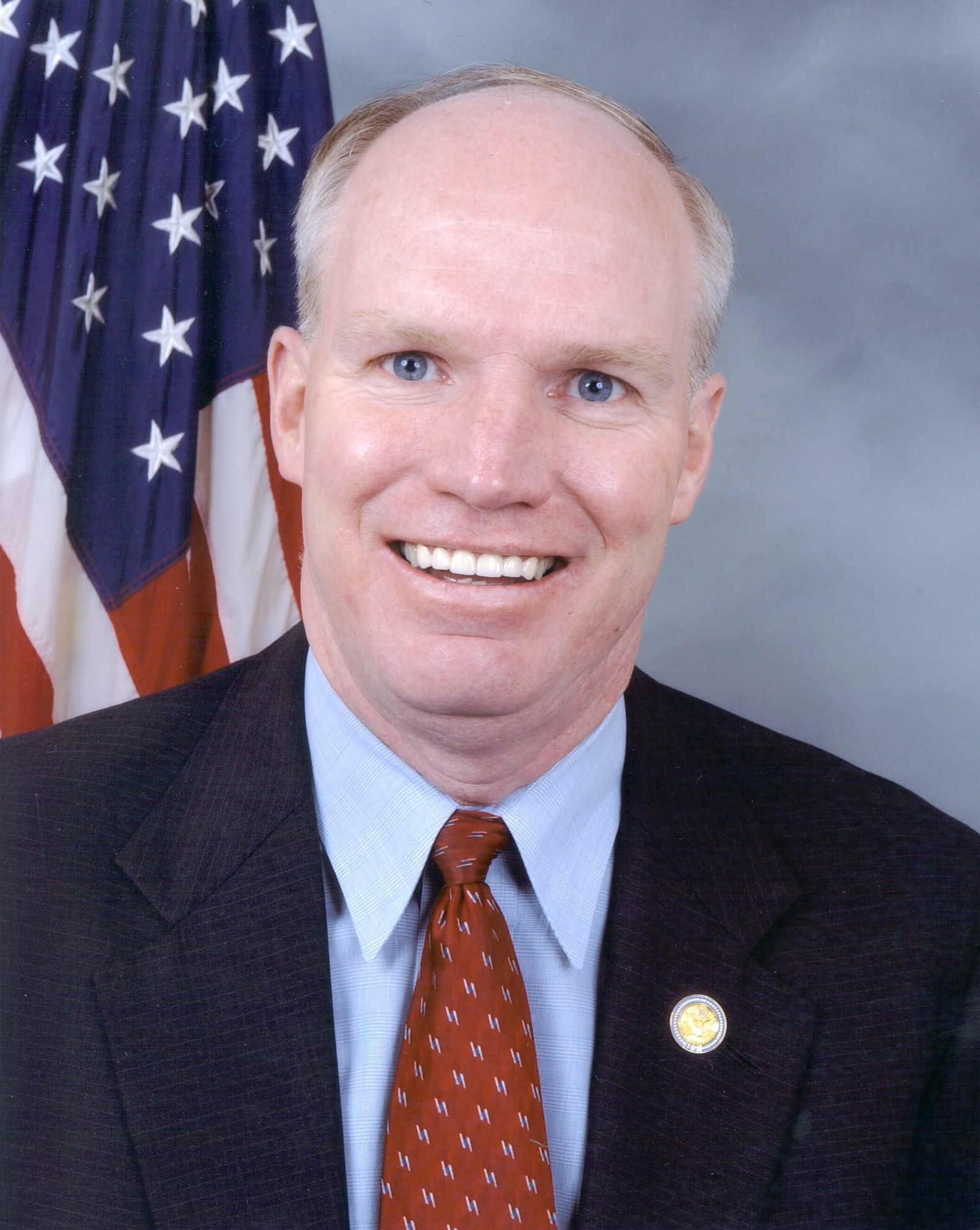

Nominee	Tim Holden	Toni Gilhooley
Party	Democratic	Republican
Popular vote	192,699	109,909
Percentage	63.68%	36.32%
- County results Holden: 50–60% 60–70% 70–80% Gilhooley: 50–60%
U.S. representative before election
Tim Holden
Democratic
Elected U.S. representative
Tim Holden
Democratic

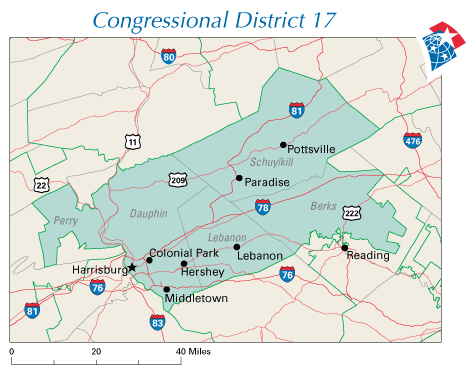

Eight term incumbent Tim Holden (D) ran against Toni Gilhooley (R), a retired Pennsylvania state trooper. The 17th congressional district gave George W. Bush 58% of its votes and has historically been dominated by Republicans. However, Holden upset the district's 10-term incumbent, George Gekas, in 2002 after being drawn into the district (he'd previously represented a Reading-based district) and hasn't faced substantive opposition since then. He is a member of the moderate Blue Dog Coalition and opposes abortion and gun control. Gilhooley was a conservative candidate. Holden has used his overwhelming support in Schuylkill County, his home county, to make up for past deficits in areas such as Lebanon County and Dauphin County.

=== Democratic primary ===
==== Nominee ====
- Tim Holden, incumbent U.S. Representative

==== Primary results ====
Democratic primary results
Party	Candidate	Votes	%
Democratic	Tim Holden (incumbent)	79,551	100.00
Total votes		79,551	100.00

=== Republican primary ===
==== Nominee ====
- Toni Gilhooley, state trooper

==== Primary results ====
Republican primary results
Party	Candidate	Votes	%
Republican	Toni Gilhooley	49,123	100.00
Total votes		49,123	100.00

=== Predictions ===
Source	Ranking	As of
The Cook Political Report	Safe D	November 6, 2008
Rothenberg	Safe D	November 2, 2008
Sabato's Crystal Ball	Safe D	November 6, 2008
Real Clear Politics	Safe D	November 7, 2008
CQ Politics	Safe D	November 6, 2008

=== General election ===
2008 Pennsylvania's 17th congressional district election
Party	Candidate	Votes	%
Democratic	Tim Holden (incumbent)	192,699	63.68
Republican	Toni Gilhooley	109,909	36.32
Total votes		302,608	100.00
Democratic hold			

- Race ranking and details from CQ Politics
- Campaign contributions from OpenSecrets

== District 18 ==
2008 Pennsylvania's 18th congressional district election
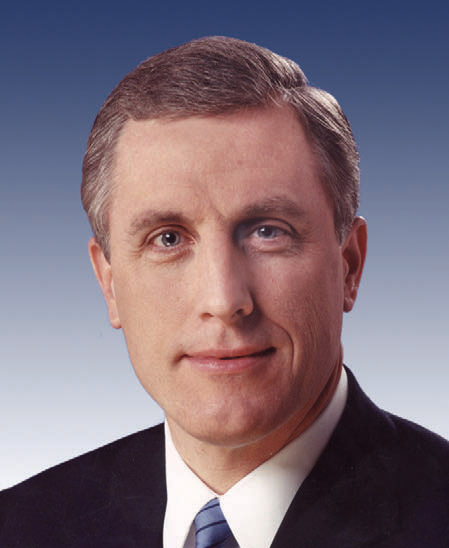

Nominee	Tim Murphy	Steve O'Donnell
Party	Republican	Democratic
Popular vote	213,349	119,661
Percentage	64.07%	35.93%
- County results Murphy: 60–70%
U.S. representative before election
Tim Murphy
Republican
Elected U.S. representative
Tim Murphy
Republican

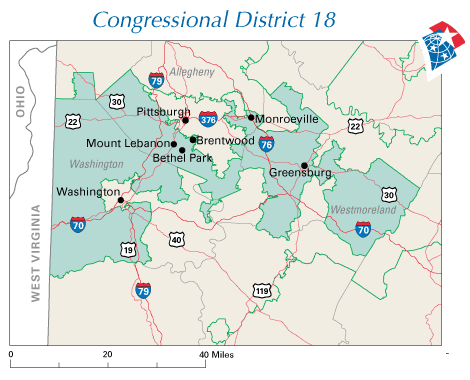

Three term Republican Tim Murphy was challenged by Democrat Steve O'Donnell, a Monroeville health care executive. Murphy was reelected in 2006 with 58% of the vote against a little-known Democrat. He represents a suburban Pittsburgh district that George W. Bush won with 54% of the vote but that has a strong Democratic history.

The DCCC tried to persuade Allegheny County Executive Dan Onorato to run, but he showed no interest in the race. Business consultant Beth Hafer, whose mother Barbara Hafer is a longtime state official, was then expected to be the front runner for the Democratic nomination. Insurance executive Brien Wall and Monroeville health care executive Steve O'Donnell also ran. O'Donnell won an upset victory with 45% of the vote in a somewhat under the radar election. Although O'Donnell should make the race competitive, Murphy has a significant advantage because of name recognition and a moderate image.

=== Democratic primary ===
==== Nominee ====
- Steve O'Donnell, Monroeville health care firm executive

==== Eliminated in primary ====
- Beth Hafer, business consultant and daughter of Barbara Hafer
- Brien Wall, insurance executive

==== Primary results ====
Democratic primary results
Party	Candidate	Votes	%
Democratic	Steve O'Donnell	52,247	44.96
Democratic	Beth Hafer	48,224	41.50
Democratic	Brien Wall	15,733	13.54
Total votes		116,204	100.00

=== Republican primary ===
==== Nominee ====
- Tim Murphy, incumbent U.S. Representative

==== Primary results ====
Republican primary results
Party	Candidate	Votes	%
Republican	Tim Murphy (incumbent)	39,780	100.00
Total votes		39,780	100.00

=== Predictions ===
Source	Ranking	As of
The Cook Political Report	Likely R	November 6, 2008
Rothenberg	Safe R	November 2, 2008
Sabato's Crystal Ball	Lean R	November 6, 2008
Real Clear Politics	Safe R	November 7, 2008
CQ Politics	Likely R	November 6, 2008

=== General election ===
2008 Pennsylvania's 18th congressional district election
Party	Candidate	Votes	%
Republican	Tim Murphy (incumbent)	213,349	64.07
Democratic	Steve O'Donnell	119,661	35.93
Total votes		333,010	100.00
Republican hold			

- Race ranking and details from CQ Politics
- Campaign contributions from OpenSecrets

== District 19 ==
2008 Pennsylvania's 19th congressional district election
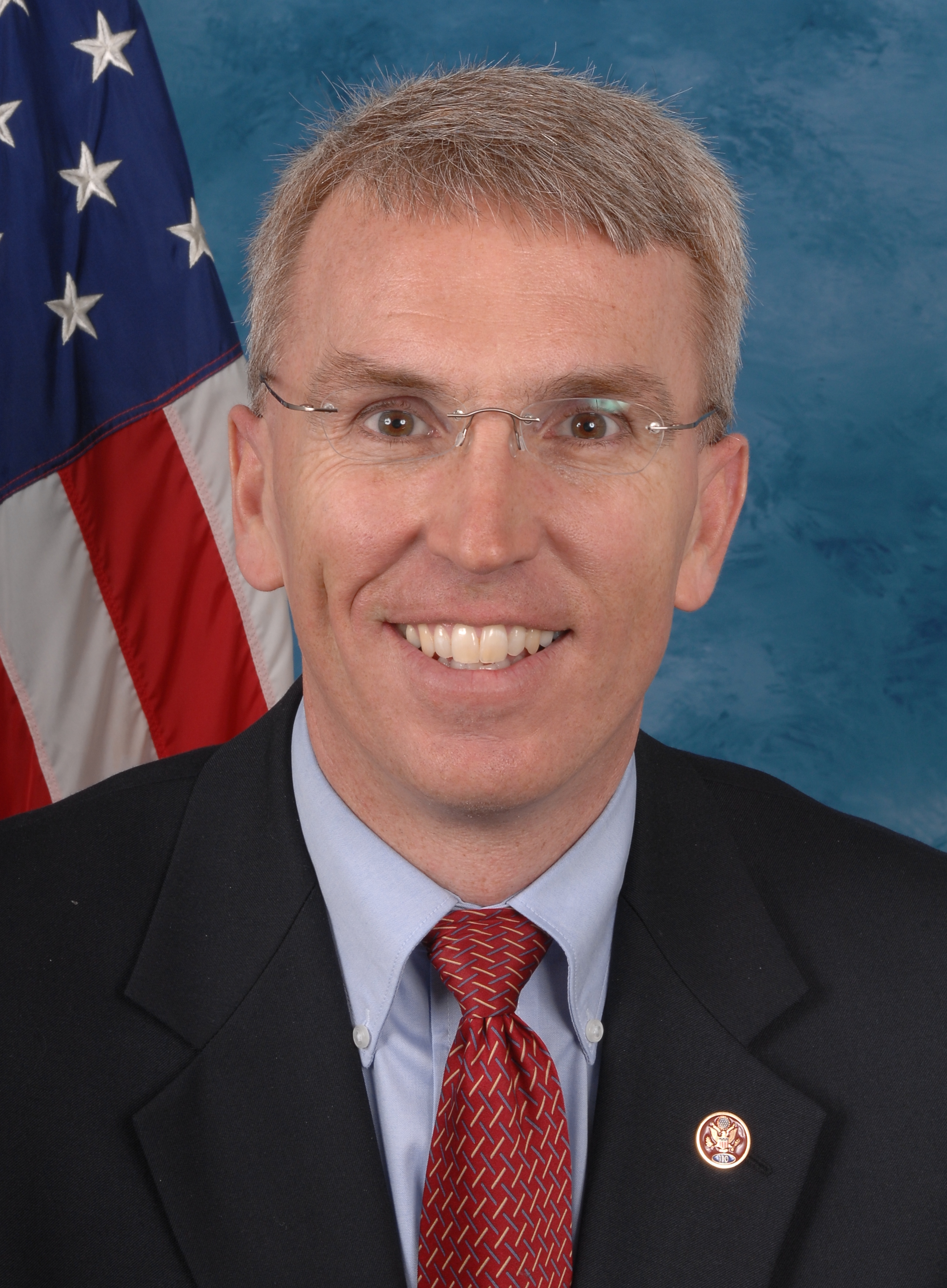

Nominee	Todd Platts	Phil Avillo
Party	Republican	Democratic
Popular vote	218,862	109,533
Percentage	66.65%	33.35%
- County results Platts: 60–70%
U.S. representative before election
Todd Platts
Republican
Elected U.S. representative
Todd Platts
Republican

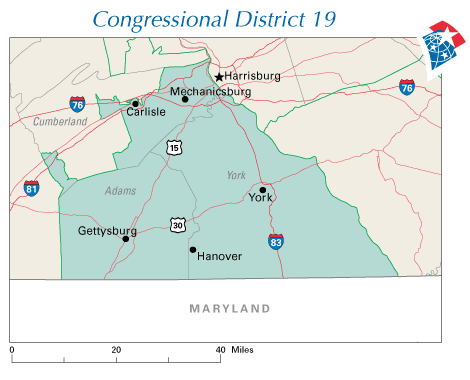

Four term incumbent Todd Russell Platts (R) ran for another term. His Democratic opponent was 2006 candidate and college professor Phil Avillo (campaign website), who was unopposed in the party primary. Platts represented a highly conservative district, which gave 64% of the vote to George W. Bush in 2004. Avillo, meanwhile, raised little money for his campaign. This race was expected to be noncompetitive.

=== Democratic primary ===
==== Nominee ====
- Philip Avillo, college professor and 2006 Democratic Party nominee

==== Primary results ====
Democratic primary results
Party	Candidate	Votes	%
Democratic	Philip Avillo	69,068	100.00
Total votes		69,068	100.00

=== Republican primary ===
==== Nominee ====
- Todd Platts, incumbent U.S. Representative

==== Primary results ====
Republican primary results
Party	Candidate	Votes	%
Republican	Todd Platts (incumbent)	57,198	100.00
Total votes		57,198	100.00

=== Predictions ===
Source	Ranking	As of
The Cook Political Report	Safe R	November 6, 2008
Rothenberg	Safe R	November 2, 2008
Sabato's Crystal Ball	Safe R	November 6, 2008
Real Clear Politics	Safe R	November 7, 2008
CQ Politics	Safe R	November 6, 2008

=== General election ===
2008 Pennsylvania's 10th congressional district election
Party	Candidate	Votes	%
Republican	Todd Platts (incumbent)	218,862	66.65
Democratic	Phil Avillo Jr.	109,533	33.35
Total votes		328,395	100.00
Republican hold			

- Race ranking and details from CQ Politics
- Campaign contributions from OpenSecrets
