= 4th Civil Affairs Group =

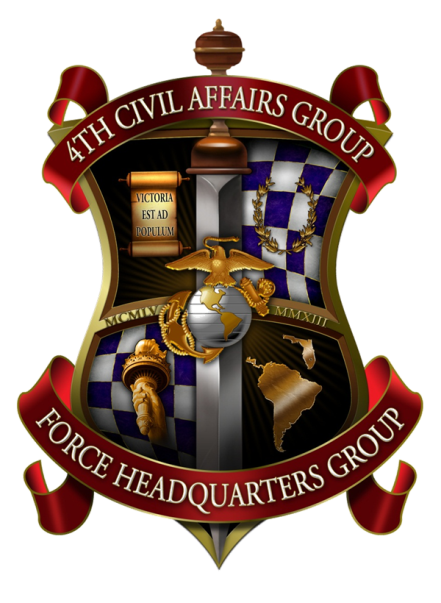
- Country: United States
- Branch: USMCR
- Type: Civil Affairs
- Role: Plan & conduct civil-military operations in concert with combat operations to reach the commander’s objectives.
- Part of: Marine Forces Reserve
- Garrison/HQ: Hialeah, FL
- Engagements: Operation Desert Storm; Operation Iraqi Freedom; Operation Enduring Freedom

Commanders
- Current commander: Colonel David Cox

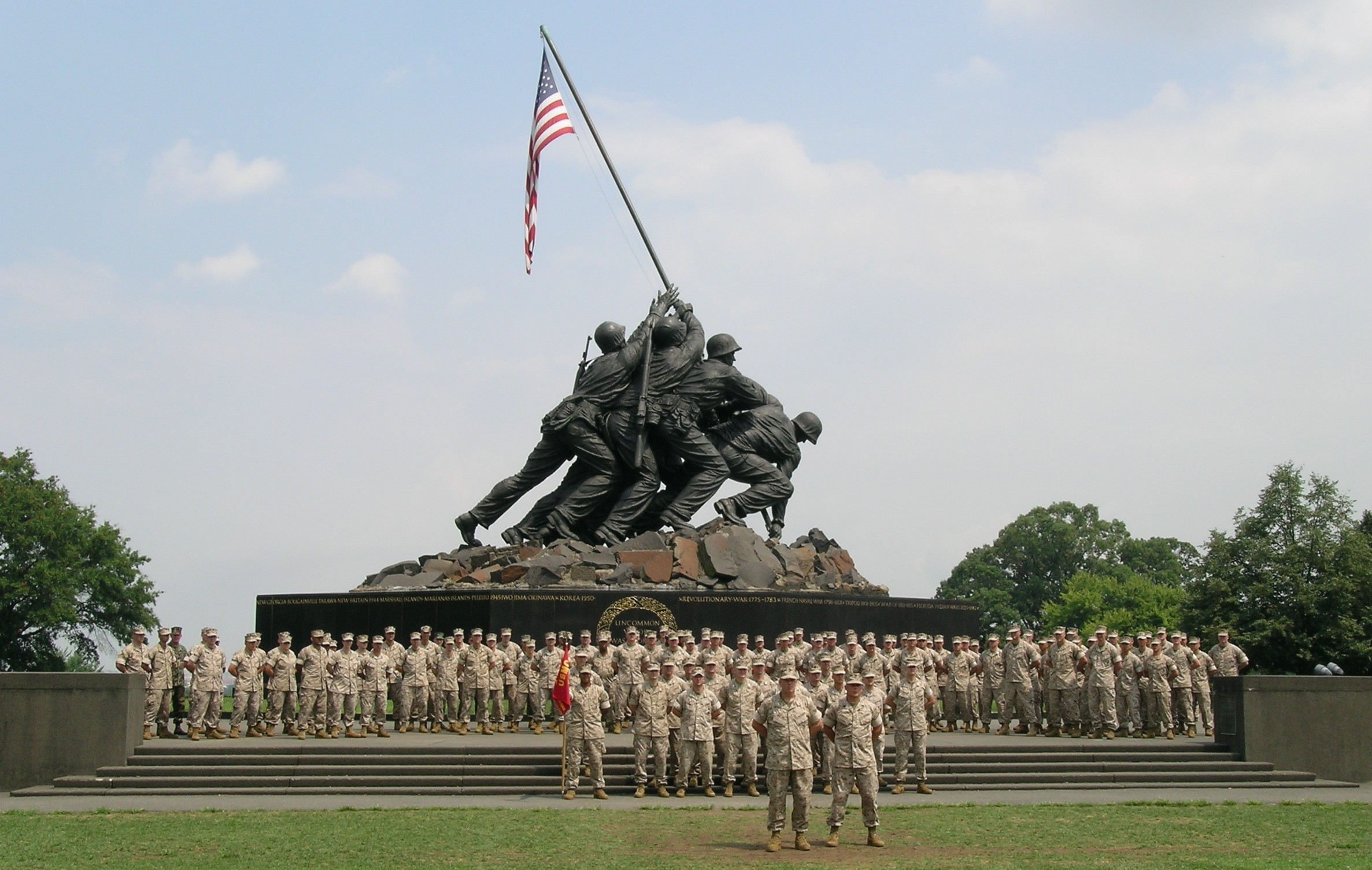
4th CAG at the USMC War Memorial, Washington, DC in August 2004

4th Civil Affairs Group (4th CAG) is a civil affairs unit of the United States Marine Corps. It is based in Hialeah, Florida. For information on 4th CAG prior to 2012, see 2nd Civil Affairs Group, which was formed out of the original 4th CAG in Washington D.C. It is one of only four civil affairs groups in the Marine Corps, all of which are reserve units. 4th CAG was the first civil affairs group in the Marine Corps and mostly supports II MEF.

== Organization ==
4th CAG is commanded by a Colonel and the unit has 38 Marine officers, 85 Marine enlisted, 4 Navy officers and 1 Navy enlisted. The unit consists of one Headquarters Detachment and three Line Detachments. Civil Affairs Marines carry the secondary Military Occupational Specialty (MOS) 0530/0531 (Civil Affairs Officer/Specialist) in addition to their primary military operational speciality.

== History ==
On November 1, 1955, 4th CAG was activated originally as 5th Staff Group at Henderson Hall, Arlington, Virginia. The first commanding officer was Colonel Winslow H. Randolph Jr. In 1973, the unit had a table of organization of 30 officers and 50 enlisted and was commanded by Colonel J. Z. Taylor. In the late 1970s, 4th CAG supported several iterations of Operation Solid Shield with NATO. In 1979, 4th CAG was relocated to Naval Support Facility Anacostia. 4th CAG activated several Marines for the first time in the unit's history to support Operation Just Cause in Panama. The entire unit was activated for the first time in December 1990 and deployed for Operation Desert Storm in 1991. During Operation Desert Storm, 4th CAG was assigned to 2nd Marine Division and helped process over 10,000 Iraqi POWs. Immediately upon return from the Middle East, a detachment from 4th CAG deployed to Northern Iraq in support of Operation Provide Comfort to provide humanitarian aid to Kurdish refugees. 4th CAG sent numerous detachments to the Balkans in mid-1990s until 2003. 4th CAG participated in numerous New Horizons missions in Central/South America and the Caribbean Islands. 4th CAG deployed to Iraq three times for the Iraq War: (1) February to September 2003, (2) August 2004 to March 2005 and (3) September 2006 to April 2007. 4th CAG sent a detachment to support Joint Task Force Katrina in New Orleans, Louisiana, from September to October 2005. 4th Civil Affairs Group also sent detachments to Afghanistan for Operation Enduring Freedom in May 2009, November 2009, and August 2011 and participated in Operation Strike of the Sword.

On December 15, 2013, 4th CAG was reactivated and relocated to Hialeah, Florida, as part of the Force Structure Review. Colonel Augustin Bolanio was assigned as the Group Commander and Sergeant Major Mark T. Davis was posted as the Group Sergeant Major. 4th CAG's primary mission is to provide civil affairs support to the U.S. Southern Command.

== Unit awards ==
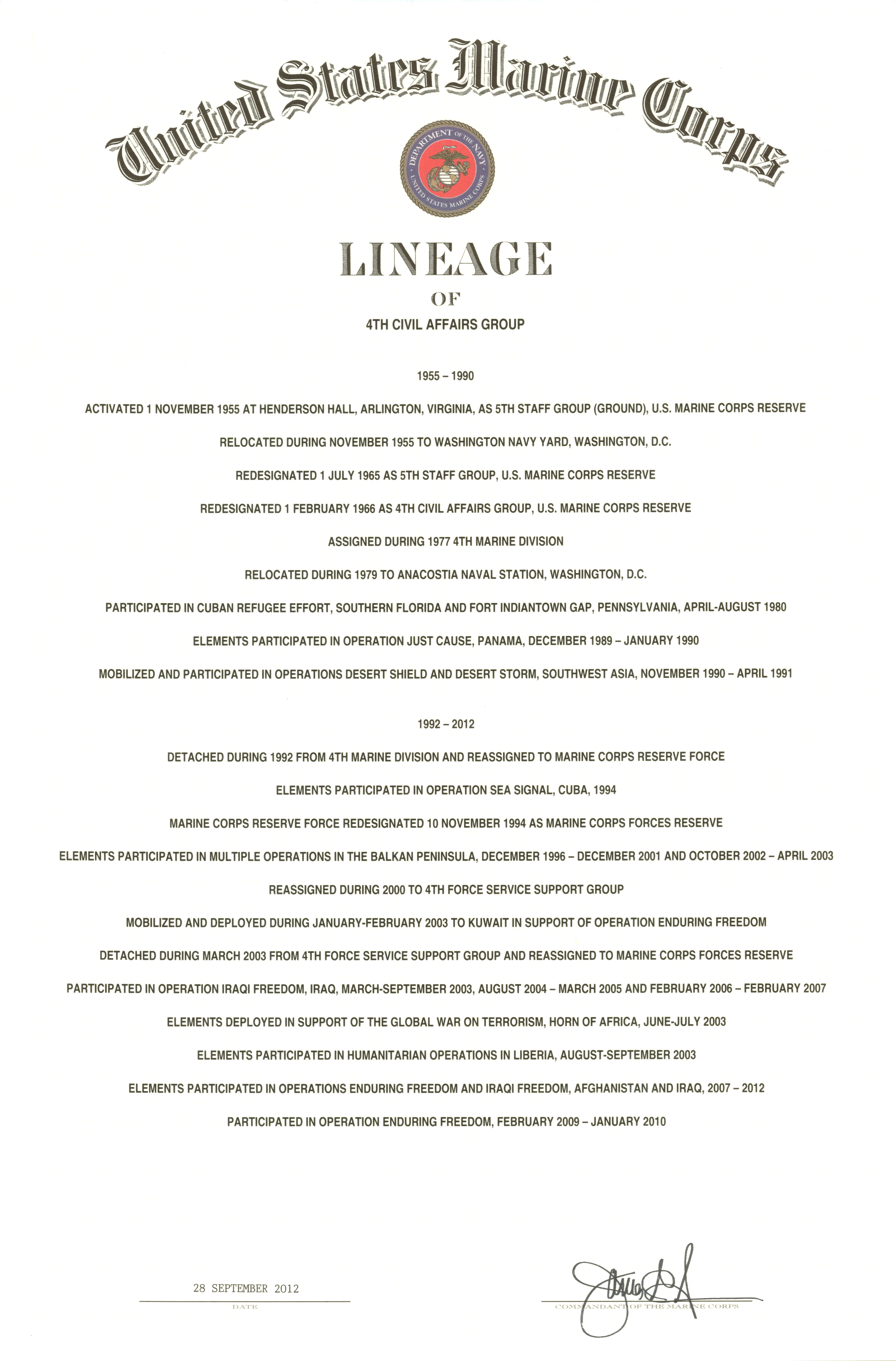
4th CAG Lineage

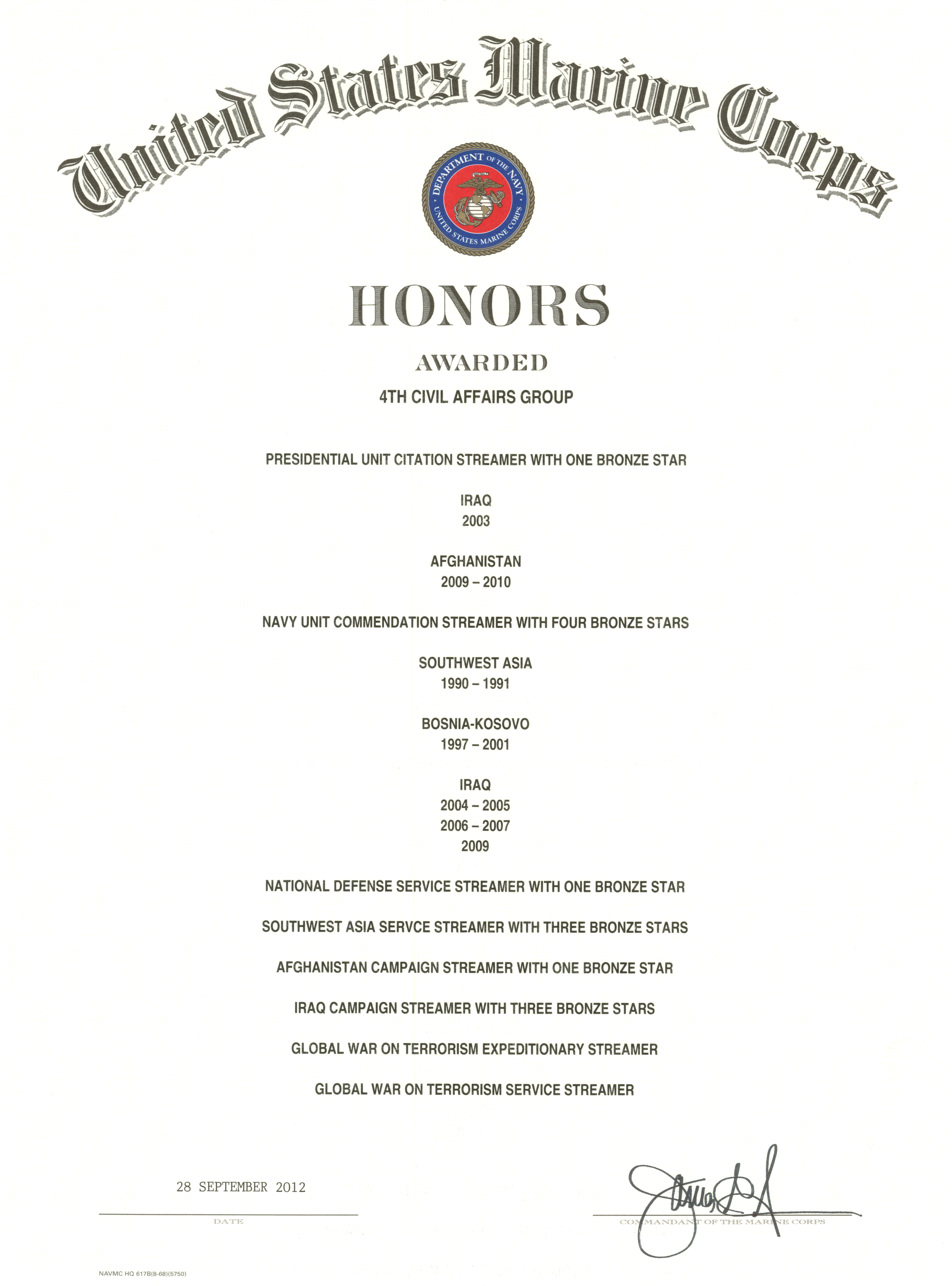
4th CAG Honors

- Presidential Unit Citation
  - March 21, 2003, to April 24, 2003 (with I MEF)
  - May 29, 2009, to April 12, 2010 (with 2d MEB)
- Navy Unit Commendation
  - January 1997 to November 2001
  - August 2, 2004, to February 1, 2005 (with I MEF)
  - September 2006 to March 2007 (with I & II MEF)
- Meritorious Unit Commendation
  - August 1, 1990, to June 30, 1991 (with 4th MarDiv)
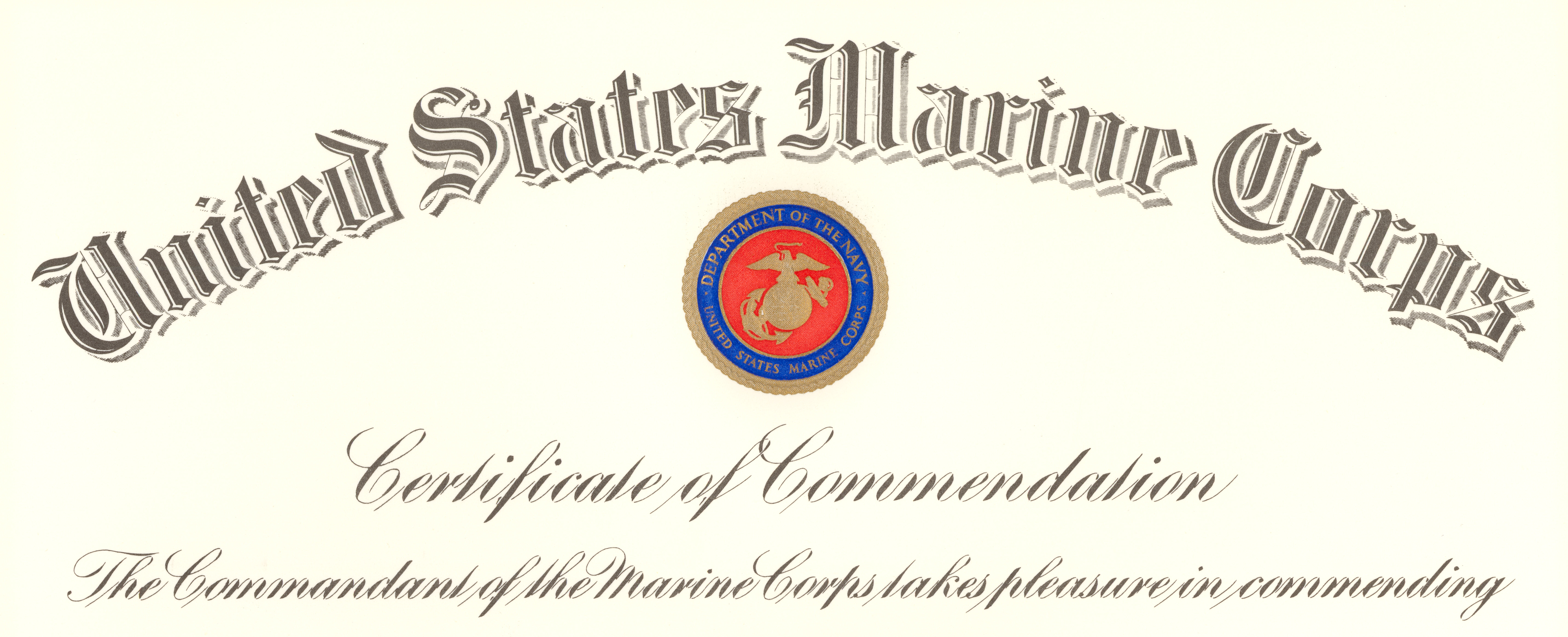
- Commandant of the Marine Corps Certificate of Commendation
  - December 1978 to December 1980

== Notable members ==
- Richard Blumenthal, U.S. Senator from Connecticut
- Paul W. Brier, retired Major General; C.O., 6th Civil Affairs Group; C.G., 4th Marine Division
- Rich Brenner, sportscaster
- Bill Cahir, ran for United States Congress; journalist; subsequently killed in action while serving with the CAG in Afghanistan
- Micah Caskey, South Carolina State Representative for the 89th District; former prosecutor
- C. Boyden Gray, diplomat; former White House Counsel; former U.S. Ambassador to the European Union
- Paul Hackett, ran for United States Congress
- Charles Lollar, ran for Governor of Maryland
- Raj Mukherji, New Jersey Senator for the 32nd District; former Majority Whip of the NJ State Assembly; former prosecutor
- Mackubin Thomas Owens, writer; senior fellow at the Foreign Policy Research Institute
- Helen Pratt, retired Major General
- Arnold L. Punaro, retired Major General
- Van Taylor, former U.S. Congressman from Texas
- Frank Ryan, former Pennsylvania State Representative for the 101st District
- Robert J. Zangas, first Coalition Provisional Authority civilian killed in action
