= Bill Cahir =

American journalist (1968–2009)

- Born: William John Cahir; December 20, 1968; Bellefonte, Pennsylvania
- Died: August 13, 2009 (aged 40); Now Zad District, Helmand Province, Afghanistan
- Cause of death: Killed in action
- Education: Penn State University
- Occupations: Journalist, marine
- Notable credit: Newhouse Newspapers
- Spouse: René E. Browne (m. 2006)
- Parents: John Cahir; Mary Anne Cahir

William John Cahir (December 20, 1968 – August 13, 2009) was a former newspaper correspondent for Newhouse Newspapers; a Congressional committee staffer for U.S. Senator Ted Kennedy (D-Mass.) and a 2008 Democratic candidate for U.S. Congress in Pennsylvania's 5th District. He was killed by a single enemy gunshot on August 13, 2009, while on active duty in Afghanistan as a U.S. Marines Reservist.

== Early life ==
William John Cahir was born in Bellefonte, Pennsylvania, and sergeant in the Marine Corps Reserve's 4th Civil Affairs Group, headquartered in Washington, D.C., a unit that specializes in civil-military operations. Former Assistant U.S. Secretary of Defense Paul McHale described Cahir's military job as "a community organizer while carrying a pack and a rifle." In the 1990s, Cahir had worked for the Southampton Press and Education Daily newspapers, as well as for the United States Senate Committee on Health, Education, Labor, and Pensions under Sen. Kennedy. He had also previously worked for former Senator Harris Wofford (D-Penn.). In 2005, he was named one of "Pennsylvania's Most Influential Reporters" by the Pennsylvania political news website PoliticsPA. Cahir had previously also deployed to Iraq as a Marine reservist, serving in Ramadi August 2004 to March 2005; and in Fallujah September 2006 to April 2007. In January 2008, Cahir resigned from his journalism job to run for Congress in Pennsylvania's 5th congressional district, which included his hometown of State College. He came in second in the Democratic primary, earning 34.9 percent of the vote. A television campaign commercial humorously depicted the challenge of pronouncing his name “care.” He was deployed to Afghanistan in May 2009. Prior to his deployment, he had been working for consulting firm Booz Allen Hamilton. Cahir graduated from Penn State University in 1990 with a degree in English. He married his wife, René E. Browne in 2006. At the time of his death, she was pregnant with twin girls and she was due in December 2009.

=== Death ===
Cahir was killed during Eastern Resolve II, a pre-dawn offensive operation in Helmand Province's Now Zad district. Much of the August 12, 2009 operation focused on controlling the Taliban-held town of Dananeh. Once a city of 30,000, more than three years of fighting had previously reduced the town's population to an estimated 2,000. Eastern Resolve II involved approximately 400 U.S. Marines and 100 Afghan troops and was intended to cut militant trade and supply lines, and to allow local residents to vote in the August 20 2009 Afghan presidential election. According to a family spokesperson, Cahir was shot in the neck while Marines entering the town encountered machine gun and small arms fire. The Associated Press also reported that fighting in Dananeh lasted more than eight hours, but that, by late morning, Marines prepared to conduct the first-ever NATO patrol in Marine-controlled portions of the town, in order to "reach out to civilians possibly huddled in their homes as sporadic but fierce outbursts of intense gunfire continued ...". Cahir was working as a Washington, D.C.–based correspondent for Newhouse News Service when he notably joined the Marines in November 2003 at age 34—a move that required requesting an exception to the service's age-restrictions. He cited a long-held interest in military service as well as the September 11 attacks as motivations for his enlistment and subsequently wrote a first-person essay regarding his boot camp experience. His military awards included the Bronze Star Medal for his service in Afghanistan, three Navy and Marine Corps Achievement Medals, and two Combat Action Ribbons. He was posthumously awarded the Purple Heart in September 2009. A memorial fund was established to pay for the family's needs at Bill Cahir Memorial Fund, Box 268, Alexandria, Virginia 22313.
