= Staff Group =

Type of US Marine Corps Reserve unit

- Active: 1955-1980
- Country: United States
- Branch: USMCR
- Size: 24 officers

Staff Group was a type of unit of the United States Marine Corps Reserve. These units trained Marine officers to serve on a division or general staff. They existed from about 1955 to 1980.

== Units ==
- 1st Staff Group (Ground), Navy and Marine Corps Reserve Training Center, Brooklyn, New York
- 3rd Staff Group
- 4th Staff Group, Philadelphia, Pennsylvania
- 5th Staff Group, Washington, DC
- 6th Staff Group, Atlanta, Georgia
- 7th Staff Group, Richmond, Virginia / St. Louis, Missouri
- 8th Staff Group, Houston, Texas
- 9th Staff Group, Forest Park, Illinois
- 13th Staff Group, Detroit, Michigan
- 16th Staff Group (Ground), San Diego, California
