= J. D. Williams (disambiguation) =

J. D. Williams (born 1978) is an American actor.

J. D. Williams may also refer to:

- J. D. Williams (admiral) (born 1935), vice admiral in the United States Navy
- J. D. Williams (Idaho politician) (born 1942), Idaho politician
- J. D. Williams (Wyoming politician), Wyoming politician
- JD Williams & Company Ltd, now part of N Brown Group
- James Dixon Williams (1877–1934), American film producer and studio executive
- James D. Williams (1808–1880), Indiana politician
- James D. Williams (Pennsylvania politician) (1943–1985)
- James Williams (defensive back) (born 1967), American football coach and former cornerback also known as J.D. Williams
