= Educational interventions for first-generation students =

Education programs for first-generation college students

Educational interventions for first-generation college students (FGCS) are programs intended to provide resources and make education more attainable and desirable for FGCS and their families. A study by Alex Casillas has identified that "FGCS […] face greater pressure not to go to college, either because of a lack of role models or because of pressure to contribute to their family's financial needs." Many interventions are being explored to lower and/or remove the fears and struggles FGCS face regarding their education. These interventions are intended to bridge the gap between FGCS and their educational experience by providing them with the access to information and resources their non-first-generation peers already have. This article discusses several programs currently being implemented, including AVID, GEAR-UP, and after-school programs, in addition to non-profit college access programs and privately funded organizations that work to address access to higher education for underprivileged and first-generation students. There is also critical discussion regarding the pedagogical role of these educational interventions in building a sense of value and belonging in its students.

== First-generation college students ==
FGCS are defined as those whose parents’ highest level of education is a high school diploma. This group of students is getting larger in the United States at the same time as educational opportunities become more accessible to students on high school campuses. There are educational interventions that have been found to help FGCS from immigrant families reach higher education. A descriptive analysis was conducted to examine how several variables influence the persistence and attainment rates of first-generation college students compared to non-first generation college students. The researchers were interested in the effects that gender, age, socioeconomic status, race-ethnicity, and institutional type had on the persistence and attainment rates of first-generation college students. Results from the analysis concluded that first-generation college students persisted and attained postsecondary degrees at significantly lower rates than students whose parents did graduate from college. Educational interventions for FGCS have included interventions like AVID, GEAR-UP, and after–school programs.

== AVID program ==
The Advancement Via Individual Determination (AVID) program has become a national educational intervention for first-generation college students in U.S. public middle and high schools. The AVID curriculum was developed on the foundation of research developed and presented by David T. Conley in his book College Knowledge, which states that American education consists of two systems created independently of each other (high school and college), that have not worked collaboratively to benefit all students regardless of their race-ethnicity or socioeconomic status. AVID's goal is for all of their students to gain acceptance into a 4-year university course. In order to achieve this goal, AVID's curriculum was developed in alignment with David T. Conley's Knowledge and Skills for University Success (KSUS) Standards. Conley's KSUS Standards recommend that students complete the course requirements that have been created in collaboration with U.C./C.S.U. schools as a result of this research.

In addition, a quasi-experimental research design was used to explore the effects the AVID program had on students' attitudes toward school, self-efficacy, self-reported grades, time spent on homework, educational goals, and academic motivation. Two schools were randomly assigned to the AVID program while one school continued with the traditional high school curriculum. The study found significant differences between the schools that implemented the AVID program and the one that did not. Results found the AVID program students spent significantly more time on homework and on college plans than students from the school that did not implement AVID as an educational intervention. AVID has significantly increased the number of FGCS accepted into college (Swanson et al., 1993).

== GEAR-UP Program ==
The Gaining Early Awareness and Readiness for Undergraduate Program (GEAR-UP) is another evidence-based intervention that promotes higher education for low-income students in U.S. public middle schools. GEAR-UP is a federally-funded program that has been implemented nationwide at schools in low-income neighborhoods. According to a report from the U.S. Department of Education, parents and students who attended a GEAR-UP school have increased knowledge concerning routes to higher education. In addition, the researchers found that GEAR-UP students enrolled more often in algebra and more advanced sciences classes in the 8th grade than non-GEAR-UP students.

== After-school programs ==
After-school programs may also be used as a form of educational intervention for FGCS. Programs after school provide students with additional opportunities to be part of the school culture. There are programs like Umoja to help give back to the community and help people succeed in life by uplifting others. The Bridge Project study examined the academic and psychosocial effects on students who participated in an after-school program for 25 English-language-learner Mexican immigrant children, from prekindergarten through 6th grade . The results of the study found children's reading comprehension increased by an average of 2.8 grade levels and their English proficiency by an average of 2.8 California English Language Development Test levels over a 2-year period.

== Non-Profit College Access Programs ==
In addition to these federally funded interventions addressing education inequities in access to higher education, non-governmental programs such as non-profit college access programs have been created. These college access programs aim to be academic enrichment programs outside what is provided by schools. Non-profit college access programs provide underserved students such as first-generation and low-income students with tutoring, personal college counseling, academic enrichment opportunities, and enrollment in summer programs among other resources. With this, these organizations aim to aid their students in making positive personal changes and gain capital for academic success in order to matriculate to colleges and universities that can bring them greater economic mobility. Research reveals that these college access programs, including privately funded and school-based college preparation programs, are successful in addressing the college readiness debt amongst low-income students of color and FGCS, with students in these programs being more likely to apply to college and for financial aid.

Several examples of privately funded programs that have arisen to address the U.S. education debt include: SEO Scholars in San Francisco and New York, the New York-based Opportunity Network, and the national organization Minds Matter. Minds Matter is based across different cities across the nation, the fourteen chapters being: Boston, Chicago, Cleveland, Denver, Detroit, Houston, Los Angeles, New York City, Philadelphia, Portland, San Francisco, Seattle, the Twin Cities, and Washington, D.C. These organizations build student cohorts, recruiting from primarily underprivileged, low-income, first-generation backgrounds and provide them with resources such as mentoring support, social-emotional learning and group instruction, in addition to standardized test preparation.

These college access programs differentiate themselves among other first-generation student interventions by recruiting their cohorts at an early age and having their students attend the comprehensive, long-term program for a number of years. SEO Scholars, for example, recruits students starting in ninth grade and follows them through an eight-year commitment. The Opportunity Network recruits students beginning the summer after 10th grade and is an intensive six-year experience. Minds Matter is a three-year program beginning in the student's sophomore year and ending on their senior year, though resources persist for their alumni network. The resources that students are provided with are geared towards helping them gain admission to, enroll, and succeed at rigorous four-year colleges where Minds Matter further provides support in their gained connections through internships, professional skills-building, and access to an alumni platform.

The general model for these programs is accomplished through weekly group instruction attendance wherein students are given peer and instructional resources in the areas of mathematics, writing, reading comprehension/ English, and in soft skills such as public speaking, social-emotional learning and leadership. College access programs also consist of sessions geared towards SAT/ACT exam preparation. In their senior year, students receive guidance in college applications in addition to scholarship applications and other resources to navigate the college application process such as in financial literacy classes. For the summers in between their school years, students engage in summer enrichment programs within the organization's curriculum or externally such as through pre-collegiate camps/programs that allow them to take college courses and experience the college lifestyle.

== Critical Discussions Regarding the Role of These Educational Interventions ==
Educational interventions for first-generation students can play a role in shaping a student beyond their attending higher education institutions. First-generation and/or low-income college students navigate a unique set of circumstances in attending higher education institutions. According to Dr. Linda Banks-Santilli, many experience what she coins “break-away guilt”, as these students often have families that depend on them and see them as their way out of poverty. These students' decision to pursue higher education can come with a sense of guilt in leaving their family and cultural histories behind. Their families can face conflicting feelings as their child's upward mobility may be viewed as a rejection of their past. Feelings of not belonging and burdens of shame can come with attending these higher institutions, which can take a mental toll on first-generation students.

These external programs beyond the classroom may have a role in building resistance in their students, especially in first-generation students. Murillo et al.'s research provides a strategic vision for this in the way that college access programs can “leverage the community cultural wealth of students of color to support college entrance in a manner that validates their forms of capital and is conducive to their success” through their building of what their research model labels as aspirational capital, linguistic capital, navigational capital, social capital, familial capital, and resistant capital. This community cultural wealth model builds from French sociologist, Pierre Bourdieu's, and professor Tara J. Yosso's models on social and cultural capital. Programs can work beyond the standardized education curriculum to help their students build personal values and connections that foster a sense of belonging, personal value, and aspirational values that help them attend and navigate their best-fit colleges.

In addition to building capital in their students, another discussion centers around the learning pedagogy and reparations for structural injustices faced by students of color in urban communities. Professor Shawn A. Ginwright's work draws on ethnographic studies across the nation to address healing strategies for stressed schools and community organizations that aim to support students in becoming powerful civic actors. This pedagogy is centered on Shawn Ginwright's five features of healing: culture that anchors young people in their ethnic identities and embraces and celebrates urban youth culture; agency that is in the form of collective and individual acts compelling youth to explore their personal power when transforming problems into possibility; relationships that allow for the capacity to create, grow, and sustain healthy connections with others; meaning that builds awareness of the intersections of personal and political life; and finally achievement that acknowledges one's movement toward explicit goals in which students understand oppression but know they are not defined by it as they explore the possibilities for their own lives and collective work.
