= Admiral Williams =

Admiral Williams may refer to:

== United Kingdom ==
- Charles Williams (Royal Navy officer) (1925–2015), British Royal Navy rear admiral
- David Williams (Royal Navy officer) (1921–2012), British Royal Navy admiral
- Hugh Pigot Williams (1858–1934), British Royal Navy vice admiral
- Simon Williams (Royal Navy officer) (fl. 1970s–2020s), British Royal Navy rear admiral
- Thomas Williams (Royal Navy officer) (1761/1762–1841), British Royal Navy admiral

== United States ==
- Clarence Stewart Williams (1863–1951), U.S. Navy admiral; commander in chief of the U.S. Asiatic Fleet 1925–1927
- Duvall Williams (born 1943), U.S. Navy rear admiral
- George Washington Williams (naval officer) (1869–1925), U.S. Navy rear admiral
- J. D. Williams (admiral) (born 1935), U.S. Navy vice admiral
- John G. Williams Jr. (1924–1991), U.S. Navy admiral
- Melvin Williams (admiral) (born 1955), U.S. Navy vice admiral
- R. C. Williams (1888–1984), U.S. Public Health Service rear admiral

== See also ==
- William Peere Williams-Freeman (1742–1832), British Royal Navy admiral
