= Senator Hankins =

Senator Hankins may refer to:

- Freeman Hankins (1917–1988), Pennsylvania State Senate
- Shirley Hankins (1931–2025), Washington State Senate
