= First-generation college students in the United States =

College students whose parents did not attend college

First-generation college students in the United States are college students whose parents did not complete a baccalaureate degree, or a child of a single parent who did not complete a baccalaureate degree. Although research has revealed that completion of a baccalaureate degree is significant in terms of upward socioeconomic mobility in the United States, a considerable body of research indicates that these students face significant systemic barriers to postsecondary education access, academic success once enrolled, and degree completion. Many of these obstacles result from systemic racial, cultural, social, and economic inequities.

Compared to their continuing-generation counterparts, first-generation college students are more likely to be older than their peers, have dependents, come from low-income families, attend college part-time, live off campus, have more work responsibilities, and hold traditionally disadvantaged ethnic and racial identities. While first-generation college students are less likely to complete their postsecondary education than their peers, those who do graduate often incur more debt to pay for their degree and accumulate less lifetime wealth than students whose parents completed a baccalaureate degree.

== Population trends ==
As reported by the National Center for Education Statistics (NCES), 33.5% of undergraduate students had parents whose highest level of education was high school or less in the 2011–2012 school year.

=== Age and dependency status ===
In 2014 the NCES reported that the following percentages of college students by age had parents whose highest education level was high school or less.

- 27.5% of students 18 years old or younger
- 27.4% of students 19–23 years old
- 35.6% of students 24–29 years old
- 42.1% of students 30–39 years old
- 50.2% of students 40 years old or older

A review of the literature on first-generation college students published by the Texas Guaranteed Student Loan Corporation (TGSLC) cites a 2001 study which reported that 31% of first-generation college students were 24 years of age or older. A 1998 study cited in the same review reported that 13% of first-generation college students were 30 years of age or older. Additionally, 46% did not start attending college immediately after high school graduation. 37% were not dependents, and 18% were married.

The NCES report for the 2011–2012 school year states the shares of undergraduate students whose parents' highest level of education was high school or less by dependency and marriage status.

- 25.4% of dependent students
- 41.3% of independent students
- 35.6% of students who are unmarried without dependents
- 37.5% of students who are married without dependents
- 47.5% of students who are unmarried with dependents
- 44.0% of students who are married with dependents

=== Employment ===
According to the NCES report for the 2011–2012 school year, the share of undergraduate full-time employed undergraduate students whose parents' highest education level was high school or less was 38.0%. This is slightly higher than the share of undergraduate students who did not work while enrolled whose parents' highest education level was high school or less (34.1%). The share of part-time employed undergraduate students whose parents' highest education level was high school or less was 29.6%. Many first-generation students are forced to work to pay for their tuition.

=== Race ===
The NCES reported these percentages of undergraduate college students whose parents had a high school diploma or less for the 2011–2012 school year:

- 47.8% of Hispanic students
- 42.0% of Black African-American students
- 39.6% of American Indian students
- 32.9% of Asian students
- 27.9% of White students
- 24.6% of Pacific Islander students
- 23.9% of students of two or more races

=== Type of institution ===
The NCES report by Redford and Hoyer following students who were high school sophomores in 2002 states that 76% of first-generation college students first enrolled in public, 9% in private, and 16% in for-profit institutions. Regarding the selectivity of institutions where first-generation college students tend to enroll, the same NCES report states that 52% enrolled in 2-year institutions whose selectivity is unclassified. Students enrolled at moderately selective 4-year institutions comprised 16%, at inclusive 4-year institutions 9%, at unclassified 4-year institutions 9%, at unclassified less than two-year institutions 9%, and at highly selective 4-year institutions 6% of the total first-generation college student population.

The NCES 2011–2012 school year data shows that almost half of undergraduates enrolled in for-profit institutions have parents whose highest level of education was high school or less. Students whose parents' highest education level was high school or less also represented:

- 33.0% of undergraduates at public universities
- 56.2% of undergraduates at less than 2-year public universities
- 38.3% of undergraduates at 2-year public universities
- 25.9% of undergraduates at 4-year public universities
- 23.1% of undergraduates at private nonprofit universities

== Adult students' experiences ==
Through interviews with first-generation college students older than 25 at a small liberal arts college, researchers Kathleen Byrd and Ginger Macdonald found that these students considered their age to be a positive contributor to their time management and self-advocacy skills. Having more experience navigating life and work contributed to their confidence. Some interviewees expressed that their self-advocacy skills in particular had helped to compensate for what they lacked in background knowledge, or cultural capital, of the college system in areas such as financial aid, student advising services, and student-professor relationships. Interviewees who were also parents cited their children as sources of motivation in their academic pursuits. In contrast to younger first-generation college students who may perceive their education as surpassing their parents, older first-generation college students may perceive their education in terms of being a role model for their children.

=== Online learning ===
According to a study of adult first-generation and continuing-generation online college students by Susan Dumais et al., most adult online learners, regardless of parent education level, are confident that they will succeed academically. However, ways that first-generation adult online learners differed from their continuing-generation counterparts in the study included "greater intrinsic motivation" to earn their degree and more usage of built-in student support services. Additionally, the first-generation students reported having more demanding work environments and less support from their employers to balance their work responsibilities with their family and academic responsibilities.

Experimental evidence suggests that the effects of academic support may depend on the mode of instruction. Aucejo and Wong conducted randomized experiments involving approximately 3,000 students in 39 introductory economics courses at Arizona State University. Personalized feedback messages combined information about students' academic performance and expectations with encouragement from professors. Among first-generation students in synchronous courses, the intervention improved academic performance, while the researchers did not find corresponding positive effects in asynchronous courses or among continuing-generation students.

== Social class and mobility ==
In an article from the Journal of Personality and Social Psychology, Stephens et al. observe that the institution of higher education in the United States of America is popularly viewed as an environment of equal opportunity regardless of social class background and a means for social mobility. Indeed, a 2002 report by Connie Ayala and Al Striplen cited in the TGSLC literature review asserts that first-generation college students are involved in a "deliberate attempt" to achieve upward social, economic, or occupational mobility. However, research by Jean Phinney et al. explain that first-generation college students' motivations for attending college also include helping one's family and responding to encouragement from others in addition to personal/career motivations. A study by Rebecca Covarrubias and Stephanie Fryburg equates first-generation college student status with a working-class family background and the university as a middle class environment. A study on first-generation college student retention rates in the U.S. revealed that a college education plays a significant role in students' potential for social mobility and status. While higher education provides opportunities for career advancement for non-FGCS, first-generation students may face financial challenges that hinder their ability to pursue further education, including financial issues, academics, and emotional stress.

Anna Stansbury and Kyra Rodriguez examined the careers of U.S. doctorate recipients in sciences and social sciences. After controlling for doctoral institution, field of study, and demographic characteristics, they found that first-generation college graduates and peers whose parents held a graduate degree other than a PhD were equally likely to receive a tenure. Among tenured professors, first-generation graduates were 4.2% less likely to hold a position at a R1 university. Their earning were about 3% lower and they also reported lower job satisfaction.

=== Cultural capital ===
Stephens et al. show that working class and middle class societies have differing cultural capital and norms, and these differences are present in the way each class approaches and values higher education. The "cultural mismatch" between the college environment and first-generation college students' working-class backgrounds can be a source of academic disadvantage. Middle class students are typically socialized to value independence, and they are encouraged to approach college with the intention to "separate and distinguish themselves from their parents..., to find themselves, to develop their voices, to follow their passions, and to influence the world". On the other hand, working class students are often socialized to value interdependence, such as by "adjusting and responding to others' needs" and "being a part of a community", and may view college through a lens of interdependence as well. The article shows how American first and second tier universities included in their study do indeed reflect the middle class values of independence, creating a mismatch between the environment familiar to students of working-class backgrounds and the college environment. Stephens et al. propose that American institutions of higher education should broaden their culture to include messages that accept and encourage interdependence so to mitigate academic disadvantages due to cultural mismatch.

=== Social capital ===
Rice et al., in an article in the journal Counseling Psychology Quarterly, conducted qualitative interviews with 14 first-generation college students to better understand the social class worldview and identity of first-generation college students from the students' own perspectives. When attempting to label their own social class, terms of social and cultural capital were more relevant than formal indicators of social class such as income, education, and occupation. According to Stephens et al., first-generation college students' tendency to have different social capital than those they are surrounded by in the college environment makes it difficult for them to feel comfortable at college. For example, first-generation college students may not have relationships with college graduates, or they may lack a sense of belonging among their classmates. In addition some African American students have shown to be reluctant to seek help from school counselors, and instead seek spiritual guidance. Some of the interviewees found that shared life experiences allowed them to bond with and feel comfortable around each other despite social class differences. Studies show that the strongest predictors for college attendance and completion are academic preparation, social support, access to information, parental involvement and knowledge about college, and financial aid. Another form of social support is the prevalence of strong social networks that support a student's academic and emotional development. Federally funded programs such as Upward Bound, Talent Search, Gear Up, and non-profit organizations such as AVID have been implemented at the secondary level to prepare first-generation students for college through academic counseling, college field trips, study skill development, and support from college graduates.

=== Information and academic decision-making ===
Research in economics has examined differences in information about the college environment as a possible contributor to differences in academic outcomes by parental education. Using panel surveys of students' expectations together with transcript records from Arizona State University, Aucejo, French, Ugalde Araya, and Zafar found that first-generation students entered college with less information and greater uncertainty about the higher-education environment than continuing-generation students, even after accounting for observable demographic characteristics and measures of college preparation.

The study also found differences in how students responded to early academic setbacks. Following poor grades in introductory courses, first-generation students were more likely to leave college and less likely to switch fields of study than observationally similar continuing-generation students. The researchers further studied a targeted first-year program and found that it reduced informational barriers, increased retention, and encouraged earlier changes of major among academically marginal students.

Economists have also tested whether exposure to academically stronger peers improves first-generation students' outcomes. Kofoed and Jones used the assignment of roommates at the United States Military Academy and found no statistically significant improvement in first-semester mathematics or English grades when first-generation students were assigned roommates with higher SAT scores. Their estimates allowed them to rule out effects larger than approximately 0.05 to 0.07 standard deviations in course grades.

=== Classism ===
In the Rice et al. article, classism is defined as the belief that all members of a certain social class possess certain characteristics inherent to that class. Many of the interviewees found it hard to recall specific experiences of classism, but nevertheless experienced being generally "looked down upon". Non-white first-generation college students in the study would sometimes refer to their experiences using racial or ethnic terms interchangeably with class terms, showing that dimensions of their identities are not separable from one another. Indeed, an article by Jessica Harris and Chris Linder discusses abundant literature reporting on the high prevalence of racial micro-aggression against graduate students of color within the university which becomes normalized due to its commonness. The interviewees also acknowledged stereotypes of students of higher classes, including that they do not work as hard or value their education as much as less affluent students.

=== Students of rural and agricultural background ===
Patrick Shultz conducted a study consisting of in-depth interviews with six first-year first-generation college students with both rural and agricultural backgrounds. Many of these students associated their agricultural backgrounds with their hard-working character, which in many cases, helped the students maintain confidence that they could work hard to persist through the challenges of college too. Sometimes, these students perceived that their peers at college did not share their past of having to work as hard as they had, which could make building relationships with these student's counterparts more challenging. Their agricultural background was a source of pride and identity which also set them apart as multidimensionally "different" from their peers.

=== Racial issues ===
In the case of African Americans in the post-Reconstruction era, higher education was seen by some as a means of generating leadership to bring entire oppressed classes to recognition.

Battle and Wright, in their quantitative assessment of W. E. B. Du Bois's "Talented Tenth" in the Journal of Black Studies, discuss the conversation around higher education that took place among black intellectual leaders in the post-Reconstruction era. Du Bois's philosophy was that the cohort of emancipated slaves who would go on to become college educated, or the "Talented Tenth", had a responsibility to become leaders and advocates for the whole of the African American community. Du Bois wanted institutions of higher education to be a means by which the "humanity of African Americans" as a whole would be "recognize[d]". Later in his life, Du Bois expressed disappointment in the Talented Tenth, accusing them of using their education for personal gain and losing solidarity with the rest of the black community.

=== Financial issues ===
A problem that first-generation students face, more frequently than other students is lack of finance with the constant growing cost of college. The cost of college often increases as students move through college. A student who manages to pay through their first year of college may find difficulty moving past that year as prices typically increase.

=== Gender issues ===
According to a primary research study, first-generation female students are experiencing high amounts of stress that is difficult to manage which can affect their progress in academics. Coming from this doubly disadvantaged background, first-generation women face adversity related to both their gender and first-generation status in academia. In a study conducted by Jennifer Blaney, special attention is paid to the intersectional disadvantages that first-generation women studying computer science face as it relates to their success, college experience, and graduation status.

== Family relationships ==
A 2014 study by Tiffany Wang in the Journal of Family Communication identified five thematic messages that 30 first-generation participants from a large public university received from their families. The first theme was "remembering family", which included messages about the importance of maintaining strong emotional connection with and loyalty to one's family and background. The second theme was "focusing on family", which included messages encouraging the student to prioritize the family highly. The third theme was "counting on family", which included messages guaranteeing unconditional support. Students who cited these messages also reflected that being at college had led them to cherish their family relationships more than in the past. The fourth theme was "not worrying about family", and included messages of assurance that the student had made the right choice in pursuing education even if sacrifices of responsibility to and time with the family had to be made. The fifth theme was "setting a good example", and included messages reminding the student of their responsibility to demonstrate maturity, hard work, and focus to younger family members and friends. More than 25% of first-generation students attend junior college, and less than half of students parents doesn't attend college.

Olson's literature review and research (2014) explores the unfamiliarity FGCS face when they navigate through their postsecondary education and the fact that they usually do this on their own.

Olson cites how FGCS have been found to enter college with the expectation that it will lead to a high-paying or prestigious job, which are not guaranteed outcomes. Brooks-Terry (1998) explores FGCS go into college with faulty expectations and struggle with "double assignment", which entail handling their courses while also learning and understanding the college lifestyle in general. Orbe (2008) explains that FGCS' understanding of the college culture becomes a "multidimensional identity negotiation" against their home culture. FGCS have to acknowledge how they change in college while also relating that to their experiences with family and friends. Orbes mentions how FGCS might not even notice this, but their family and friends will acknowledge this change. The challenge comes with the accusations that the student has changed or is not remaining true to their culture, which further complicates their identity and belief in their potential to succeed.

Additionally, Olson addresses the obstacles the FGCS faces when wanting to move out. London (1989) explains how families of FGCS assign roles to keep them grounded to their families. Families may delegate the FGCS as the example for other members of the family, or keep them at home so they can remain reliant on family. Their success then becomes validated by family approval as well as by completing their own goals.

Furthermore, Olson applies social cognitive career theory (SCCT) when exploring self-efficacy in more depth. Bandura (1986) says that self-efficacy and success of FGCS may be "learned" by watching their peers fail in college. It is likely that their perspectives are not accurate, and their families lack of education experience negatively reinforces the notion that they will not succeed. Gibbons and Borders (2010) highlight that while FGCS may overcome many obstacles, they still have the notion that they are not as successful as they should have been. Regardless, SCCT predicts that if a FGCS has strong family support, they are more likely to believe in their personal goals and path to higher education and a stronger sense of self-efficacy.

== Impostor syndrome or phenomenon ==
Research has found that first-generation college students experience of imposter syndrome (IP) at higher rates than their continuing-generation peers. Initially coined as the "impostor phenomenon" by Pauline Clance and Joe Langford in 1978 to describe the "internal experience of intellectual phoniness" among high-achieving women in the workplace, impostor syndrome has been attributed as the reason that many first-generation college students feel that they do not belong in postsecondary education and/or do not have the skills or intelligence to complete their studies. First-generation college students who struggle with impostor syndrome often cite feeling that their classes are highly competitive and that their continuing-generation peers may "find out" that they are not as capable, as skilled, or as intelligent as they may be perceived. IP perceptions can be influenced depending on the student's familial background. According to research, first-generation students are generally less academically prepared for college because they do not have the guidance by their parents. In return, they develop lower self-esteem and lower ambitions to complete their degree because they feel pressurized by the burden of attaining social norms and succeeding.

In The Journal of Higher Education, Ernest Pascarella et al. reiterate the fact that first-generation students have a hard time completing their higher education due to their constant struggle of comparing themselves with their counterpart, students who have parents with a degree. The feelings of inadequacy or feeling like a fraud can be overpowering and mentally limit a student from achieving their best. When first-generation students can't find a support system at home, they feel lonely and go into a state of attrition. Martinez et al. emphasize in their article that "low parental education predicts attrition".

Impostor syndrome has been observed to have detrimental effects on the academic, social, and emotional wellbeing of first-generation college students. Impostor syndrome has been identified as a barrier to the engagement, performance, and retention of first-generation college students, with some studies finding that impostor feelings can predict students' academic performance (including course engagement, attendance, withdraw/dropout intentions, and grades), as well as their social integration and emotional health.

Educators and institutions can help these students overcome their fears with the right resources if they were put into place. Joel Bothello and Thomas J. Roulet, authors of The Imposter Syndrome, or the Mis-Representation of Self in Academic Life, state, "higher education establishments need to change their incentive systems. Scholars need to be encouraged to act less as mercenaries and more as public intellectuals, loyal to institutions that promote and cherish a holistic contribution".

Most research tasks postsecondary institutions with addressing impostor feelings among first-generation college students through a two-pronged approach of mental health and institutional supports.

== Graduation rates ==
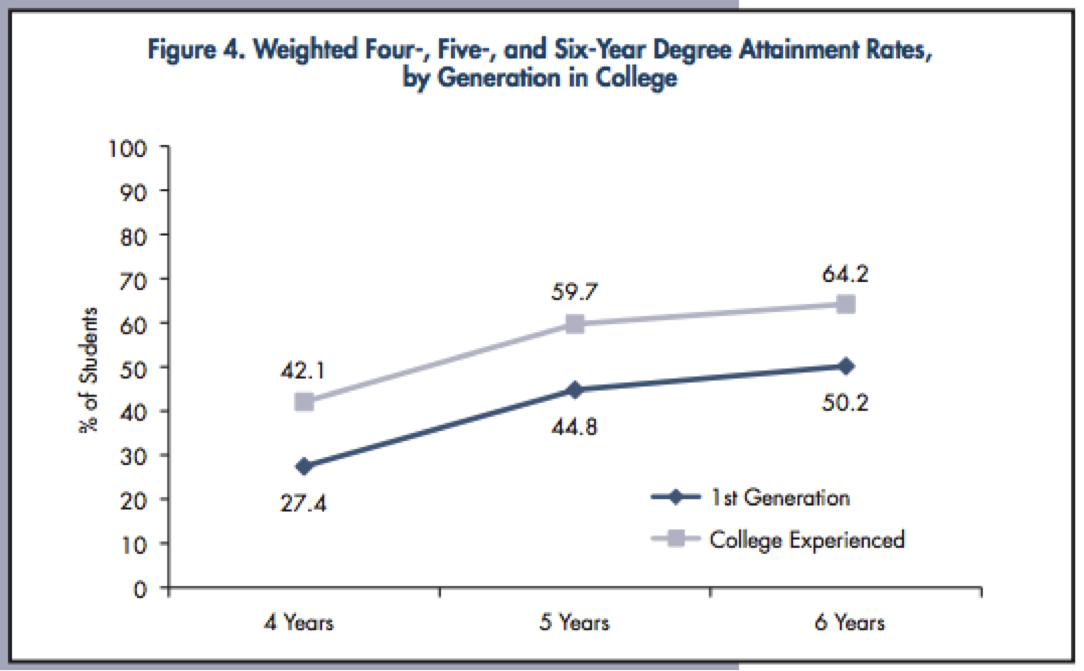
Four, Five, and Six-year degree attainment rates by generation in college

Four, Five, and Six-year degree attainment rates by race/ethnicity

DeAngelo provides statistics on graduation rates among FGCS and non-FGCS in a framework of four, five, and six years as well as a table that breaks down the degree attainment by race/ethnicity. These images from the study provide a breakdown, and show the huge gaps in degree attainment. A new study revealed that only 27 percent of first-generation students will earn a bachelor's degree within four years of entering college, lagging far behind their continuing-generation peers.

== Obstacles to access ==
In a 2001 US Department of Education report, Susan Choy explains that in order to becoming a college student requires a student proceed through multiple steps, starting with aspiring to earn a bachelor's degree, then achieving at least minimal academic preparation, then taking the SAT or ACT test, and finally, applying to a four-year institution. Her report shows that as a students' parents' education level increases, so does the students' likelihood of completing each step along the way to enrollment at a four-year institution. Choy also reports that the likelihood that a students will enroll in a four-year higher education institution is highly correlated with taking more advanced math courses in high school. While students whose parents had less education were less likely to take more advanced math courses, the likelihood of enrolling in college for students whose parents did not go to college greatly increases with the level of math course they take, especially if they take algebra in 8th grade.

A 2025 working paper used North Carolina public school records and found that FGCS were 17% less likely to score in the top tenth on the state's third-grade mathematics test. Among students who scored in the top tenth in third grade, fewer than 40% of those without a college-educated parent remained in the top tenth in eighth grade, compared with more than 60% of those with a college-educated parent.

Regarding the last step in the college enrollment process, application, the literature review by Carmen Tym et al. explains that first-generation college students are not as likely to receive help from their parents nor their schools. Additionally, prospective first-generation college students are less likely to have full access to the internet, a highly useful tool for researching and applying to colleges.

Because of a lack of experience, first-generation college students' parents do not always understand what the academic requirements are to attend a four-year college; therefore they cannot prepare their children for admission to such universities or the stress of the college experience. First-generation past students now parents would advise their children different from how they were advised when they were college students, with the advice they wish they were given by their parents. Students must rely on their teachers and counselors to place them on the correct track in order to enroll in any form of post-secondary education. DeAngelo (et al., 2011) explains how prior academic achievements impact degree completion. These are explored through SAT scores and high school grades. FGCS with a higher-grade average in high school and SAT composite scores are more likely to graduate in 4 years. If these students don't understand the impact of their SAT scores and GPAs on their likelihood to graduate, they are not predisposed to take them seriously, while college experienced students know that based on their previous knowledge. By the results being shown, it suggest that the results of the supportive relationship within their community are usually associated with higher levels of satisfaction but not academic achievement as measured by grades.

More recent economics research has examined how test-optional admissions affect first-generation applicants. Using data from one highly selective institution, Sacerdote, Staiger, and Tine found that high-achieving applicants from disadvantaged backgrounds submitted standardized-test scores at relatively low rates under test-optional admissions. In their study, submitting a score substantially increased admission probabilities; the authors found a similar advantage from score submission among high-achieving first-generation applicants.

Evidence from a broader set of institutions shows a more complex pattern. Using data from the largest U.S. college-application platform during the expansion of test-optional policies from 2018 to 2021, Avery, Shi, and Magouirk found that applications by underrepresented students to elite colleges did not increase substantially, but elite colleges enrolled more students with lower test scores and strong high-school grades, particularly first-generation and lower-income students. The authors also found increased enrollment of high-scoring students at less-selective institutions, raising the possibility that test-optional admissions can affect academic matching between students and colleges.

=== Students of rural background ===
A study by Mara Casey Tieken discusses the tension that many students from rural backgrounds face when deciding whether to attend college. The choice between staying at home to working in a trade which does not require a college degree and pursuing an education which will likely result in that student permanently living away from where they grew up can be hard because of mixed expectations and hopes from the students themselves, their parents, and their advisors or mentors. Many of the students of agricultural background interviewed by Patrick Schultz made the decision to pursue post-secondary education in late high school. When a student's parents supported their pursuit of post-secondary education, the decision to attend college was much easier, but when parental support was absent, the decision was more likely to be conflicted and confusing.

== Family achievement guilt ==
Family achievement guilt is defined by Rebecca Covarrubias, Andrea Romero, and Michael Trivelli as a student's feeling of guilt caused by having more academic opportunities and success compared to other family members. Geraldine Piorkowski has used the term "survivor's guilt" to describe these emotions after examining the impact of attending college on low-income, African American first-generation college students, as they felt like their academic success meant that they were abandoning their family and difficult home conditions.

Studies on family achievement guilt have reported that minority students are more likely to be the first in their family to attend college than non-minority students and that they are prone to feelings of guilt over prior generations' inability to pursue further education due to a variety of factors. As a result, these students are more likely to attempt to hide or downplay their scholastic achievements, which can lead to the students becoming depressed. The students living on what they perceive as "luxurious campuses" have also reported feeling guilt, particularly if their family members continue to experience suffering. Covarrbuias et al. have suggested that depression and family achievement guilt can be lessened by students reflecting on times they helped their family.

Most first-generation college students (FGCS) feel the guilt of achieving great success in college because most of their parents did not even finish elementary school, middle school, high school or any post secondary education. They face unique psychological challenges according to associate professor of Education Linda Banks-Santilli in an article published in The Washington Post. This is something that is common among minority Latinx families. The parents of first-generation college students chose to sacrifice their education to come to another country to find better opportunities for themselves and for their future families. With that being said, some of FGCS are also looked down upon because their relatives are not getting or taking advantage of the same opportunities. Although some relatives are supportive, others are envious and judgmental and may be quick to judge when they see their cousins or other relatives taking advantage of the opportunities given to them. Some go as far to say that those who pursue the college route are a disgrace to the family name because they are not following the traditions and are putting their immediate family into student debt.

== Supporting FGCS ==
The Institute for Higher Education (September 2012), provides an issue brief and describes how to support FGCS through classroom-based practices. First, faculty can be key allies as they are the key point of contact for students in the classroom. When faculty are encouraged by their institutions to uphold strong leadership roles in FGCS initiatives, the results are extremely beneficial. The issue brief has a very helpful graphic that breaks down the strategies faculty can use to help students. Additionally, the Institute for Higher Education (2012) identifies how it is crucial for institutions to examine barriers faced by FGCS and to redesign their curriculum to better serve these students. Some possible approaches involve educators implementing tutoring programs and proving supplemental services to better serve this community. They can create an initiative to train faculty and instructors specially, while keeping in consideration the cultural obstacles these students may face. By identifying and integrating cultural characteristics into the way they serve FGCS, they are being more inclusive and creating stronger relationships between the students and faculty. There are also many educational interventions being put into place to proved more programs and opportunities for FGCS, including AVID, GEAR-UP, and other after school programs.

Because many Minority-Serving Institutions (MSI's) don't have a strong grasp on how many FGCS are on their campuses, they may not understand how to serve this community. The Institute for Higher Education (2012) emphasizes the need to use data (also known as evidence-based solutions) to support the efforts to strengthen programs to help FGCS. Some methods include primarily identifying the number of FGCS and the qualitative and quantitative approaches to better serving the population. Schools can also use research models to not only design, but track the most effective practices that provide the utmost opportunities for FGCS. It is also important that teachers and counselors understand how these students define success, and how it may not be measurable or equivalent to an average student whose parents have not attended college before.

Although there are programs intact to help FGCS, The Council for Opportunity in Education (COE) states that these programs can only serve 11 percent of students. The Institute for Higher Education also points out the obstacles that these programs may not be implemented early enough and may not necessarily be targeted only towards FGCS. If counselors, teachers, and administrators understand the cultural aspect that affects FGCS, they will have the tools necessary to take a holistic approach in proving these students with the specific help they need. Since 2017, the COE and partner organisations also organise an annual first-gen day celebration on November 8th, anniversary of the signing of the Higher Education Act of 1965, to celebrate, raise awareness and promote supportive environments for FGCS.

In randomized experiments involving approximately 3,000 students at Arizona State University, Aucejo and Wong found that personalized messages combining professor encouragement with information about academic performance and students' expectations improved outcomes for first-generation students in synchronous introductory courses. Effects were not found for first-generation students in asynchronous courses, suggesting that the effectiveness of faculty feedback can depend on instructional context.

Bird and Castleman experimentally studied an intervention in which tutoring and advising were embedded directly in gateway courses at community colleges and targeted toward students considered at risk of not completing the course. Students in treated course sections increased their use of instructors, tutors, and academic advisors. The increase in use of in-person support was particularly large among first-generation students.

Information interventions can also affect students' choices of academic fields. Pugatch and Schroeder randomly assigned more than 2,200 students to receive information about the economics major, with some messages also emphasizing careers or financial returns. Receiving a message increased the proportion of first-generation students who became economics majors by approximately five percentage points in their study.

A related study by Edwards and Meer examined encouragement emails sent to high-performing students in an introductory microeconomics course at a large public university. Using a regression-discontinuity design, they found evidence that the encouragement increased subsequent enrollment in intermediate microeconomics, particularly among first-generation students and members of underrepresented groups, although effects on switching majors or declaring an economics minor were limited.

== See also ==
- Educational interventions for first-generation college students
