= James O'Donnell =

James O'Donnell may refer to:

- James Louis O'Donel (1730–1811), Roman Catholic bishop of St. John's, Newfoundland
- James O'Donnell (architect) (1774–1830), architect
- James O'Donnell (footballer) (born 2002), Australian rules footballer for the Western Bulldogs
- James O'Donnell (organist) (born 1961), organist of Westminster Abbey
- James O'Donnell (politician) (1840–1915), United States Representative from Michigan
- James O'Donnell (rugby union) (1860–1942), New Zealand rugby player
- Jim O'Donnell (basketball) (James O'Donnell, 1912–1984), American professional basketball player
- Jimmy O'Donnell (James M. O'Donnell, 1872–1946), American sports promoter and founder of the NFL's Cleveland Tigers
- James J. O'Donnell, former provost of Georgetown University
- James P. O'Donnell (1917–1990), historian
- James P. O'Donnell (politician) (1920–1997), Pennsylvania politician
- James O'Donnell Bennett (1870–1940), American journalist and author
