= Senator Grady =

Senator Grady may refer to:

- Amy Grady (born 1979), West Virginia State Senate
- John C. Grady (1847–1916), Pennsylvania State Senate
- Thomas F. Grady (1853–1912), New York State Senate
