= Jamie Gauthier =

American politician

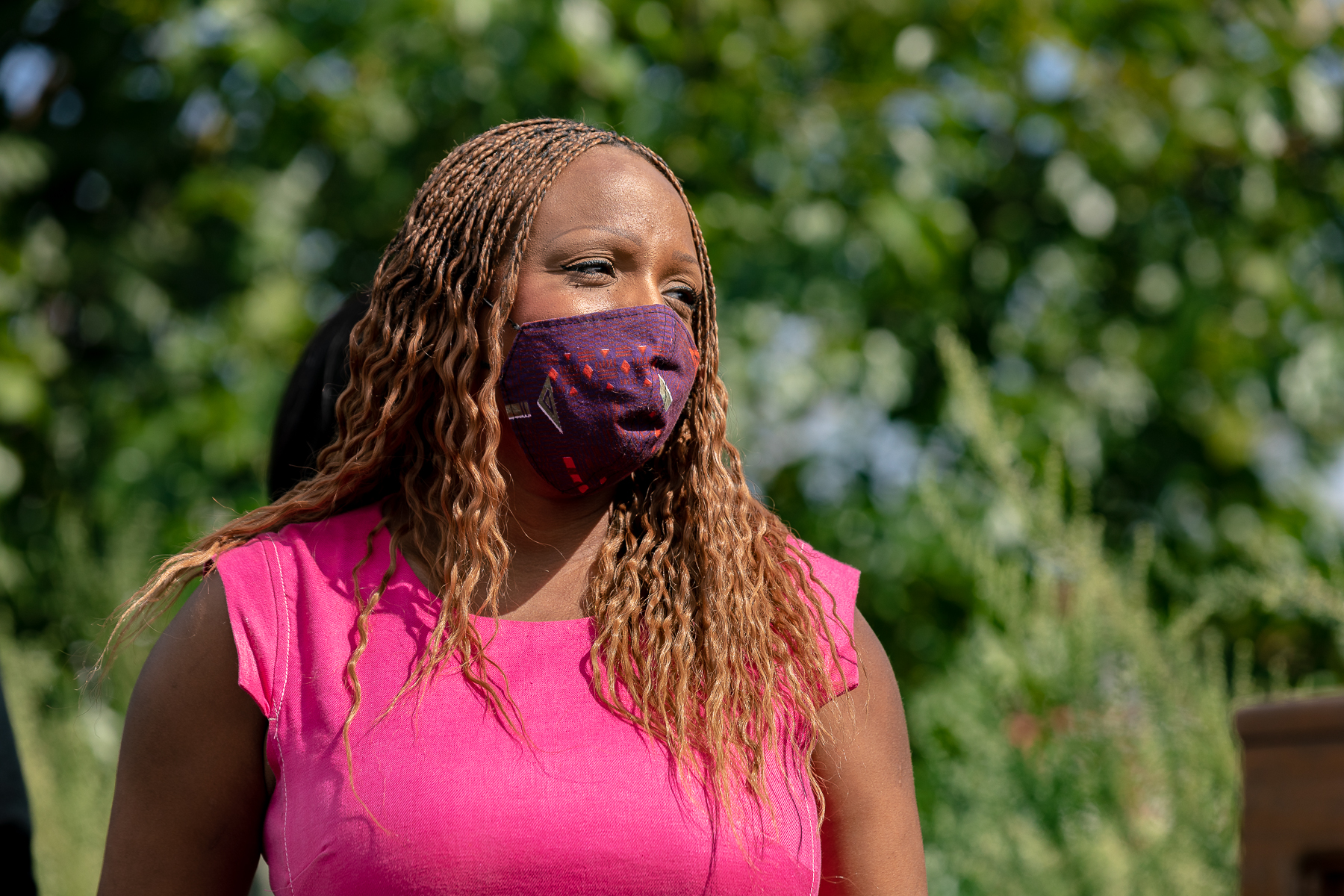

Member of the Philadelphia City Council from the 3rd district
- Incumbent
- Assumed office January 6, 2020
- Preceded by: Jannie Blackwell

Personal details
- Born: 1978 or 1979 (age 47–48) Philadelphia, Pennsylvania, U.S.
- Party: Democratic
- Children: 2
- Education: Temple University (BA); University of Pennsylvania (MUP)

Jamie Gauthier (born 1978 or 1979) is an American Democratic politician and member of the Philadelphia City Council. In 2019, she was elected to represent the Third District, which covers much of West Philadelphia and Southwest Philadelphia.

== Early life and career ==
Gauthier was born in the Kingsessing neighborhood of Philadelphia. Her father, Leon Williams, ran for District Attorney of Philadelphia twice as an independent candidate. She received her undergraduate degree in Accounting from Temple University and her Masters in City Planning from the University of Pennsylvania. Prior to getting her masters degree, she worked at DuPont as an accountant for two years.

Gauthier founded Mommy Grads, an organization dedicated to helping single mothers raise children while attending college. She worked as a program officer with the Local Initiatives Support Corporation before serving as executive director of the Sustainable Business Network of Greater Philadelphia from 2013 to 2017. In 2017, she became executive director of the Fairmount Park Conservancy.

== Philadelphia City Council ==
In January 2019, Gauthier announced she would challenge longtime incumbent Jannie Blackwell in the Democratic primary for Philadelphia City Council in the Third District, which covers much of West Philadelphia and Southwest Philadelphia. Blackwell had represented the district since 1992, when she succeeded her husband Lucien Blackwell, who previously held the seat for 17 years. Gauthier defeated Blackwell by 56%-44% in the May 2019 primary, in what was called "a huge upset over one of the biggest political dynasties in Philly politics." Gauthier faced no opposition in the general election.

In 2023, Gauthier proposed legislation to permit a 104-unit affordable apartment building at 50th and Warrington Streets after a lawsuit by nearby resident Melissa Johanningmeier had previously blocked the development. Johanningmeier subsequently sued the city again to stop the project, and was ruled against in court in 2025.

== Personal life ==
Gauthier lives in the Kingsessing neighborhood with her two sons. Her sister, Samantha Williams, worked as a legislative aide to Philadelphia City Council member Curtis Jones Jr. before being elected as a Judge of Philadelphia's Court of Common Pleas in 2023.

== See also ==
- List of members of Philadelphia City Council since 1952
