= Thomas W. Blackwell =

American politician

Member of the Pennsylvania House of Representatives from the 190th district
- In office January 4, 2005 – November 30, 2008
- Preceded by: Michael Horsey
- Succeeded by: Vanessa Brown

Personal details
- Born: August 29, 1958 Philadelphia, Pennsylvania
- Died: August 22, 2017 (aged 58) Philadelphia, Pennsylvania
- Party: Democratic
- Children: 3
- Parent: Lucien Blackwell (father)
- Education: Saint Academy
- Occupation: Community Liaison to Congressman Robert Brady

Thomas W. Blackwell IV (August 29, 1958 – August 22, 2017) was a Democratic member of the Pennsylvania House of Representatives, representing the 190th District from 2005 to 2008. He lived in Philadelphia, Pennsylvania and was a father of three, one daughter and two sons. Blackwell was a commissioner of the Philadelphia Regional Port Authority; worked for the International Longshoremen's Association as a longshoreman, business agent and eventual president of Local 1332. He lost the 2008 primary election and was succeeded by fellow Democrat Vanessa Brown. He was the son of Lucien E. Blackwell and Gloria L. Blackwell. He was also the step-son of Jannie Blackwell. He died on August 22, 2017, at age 58.
