= James Barber (politician) =

American politician

Member of the Pennsylvania House of Representatives from the 190th district
- In office January 7, 1969 – November 30, 1986
- Preceded by: District Created
- Succeeded by: Vincent Hughes

Personal details
- Born: August 16, 1921 Columbia, South Carolina
- Died: December 23, 2001 (aged 80) Wilmington, Delaware
- Party: Democratic

James David Barber (August 16, 1921 – December 23, 2001) was a former Democratic member of the Pennsylvania House of Representatives.
