= Pennsylvania House of Representatives, District 188 =

American legislative district

Pennsylvania's 188th State House of Representatives district
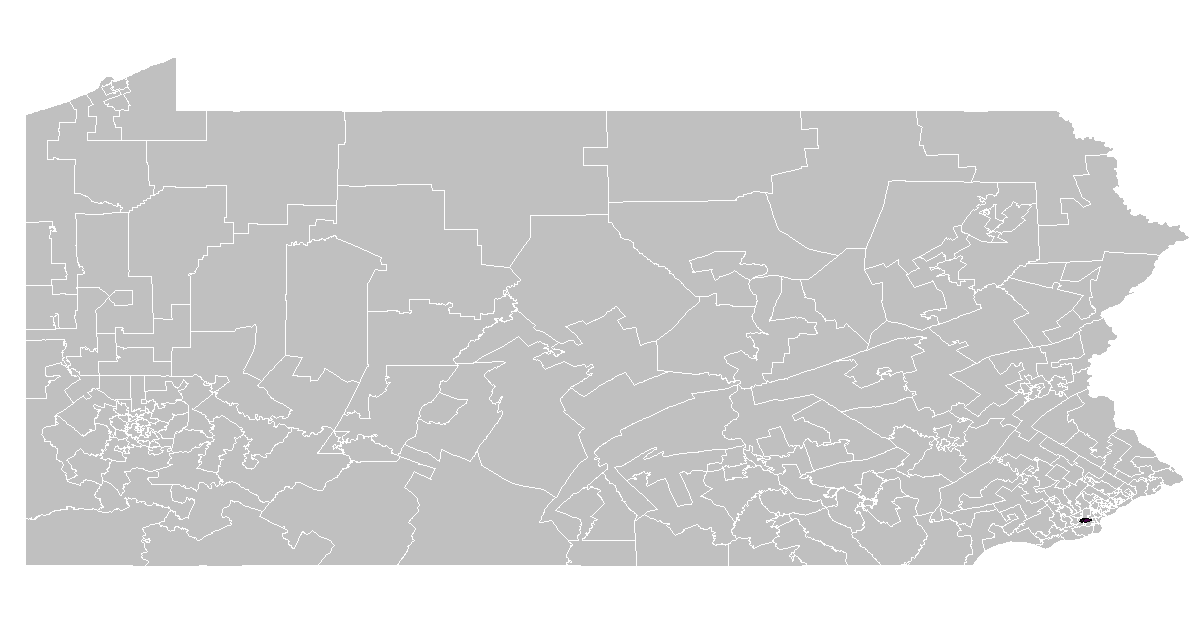
Representative
Rick Krajewski; D–Philadelphia
- Demographics: 32.8% White; 49.6% Black; 3.9% Hispanic
- Population (2011) • Citizens of voting age: 60,761; 51,452

The 188th Pennsylvania House of Representatives District is located in Southeast Pennsylvania and has been represented since 2021 by Rick Krajewski.

== District profile ==
The 188th Pennsylvania House of Representatives District is located in Philadelphia County and encompasses the University of Pennsylvania and the University of the Sciences. It also includes the following areas:

- Ward 27
- Ward 46
- Ward 51 [PART, Divisions 02, 04, 05, 06, 13, 14, 15, 16, 17, 18, 19, 20, 26 and 28]
- Ward 60 [PART, Divisions 01, 02, 03 and 23]

== Representatives ==
Representative	Party	Years	District home	Note
Prior to 1969, seats were apportioned by county.
James P. O'Donnell	Democrat	1969 – 1972		
Lucien E. Blackwell	Democratic	1973 – 1976		
Alija Dumas	Democratic	1977 – 1980		
James D. Williams	Democratic	1981 – 1985		Died on March 13, 1985
James R. Roebuck, Jr.	Democratic	1985 – 2021		Elected May 21, 1985 to fill vacancy. Lost renomination bid.
Rick Krajewski	Democratic	2021 – present		Incumbent

== Recent election results ==
PA House election, 2010: Pennsylvania House, District 188
Party	Candidate	Votes	%	±%
Democratic	James R. Roebuck Jr.	15,249	100.0	
Margin of victory				
Turnout		15,249	100.0	

PA House election, 2012: Pennsylvania House, District 188
Party	Candidate	Votes	%	±%
Democratic	James R. Roebuck Jr.	22,715	93.72	
Republican	Ernest Adkins	1,521	6.28	
Margin of victory		21,194	87.44	
Turnout		24,236	100.0	

PA House election, 2014: Pennsylvania House, District 188
Party	Candidate	Votes	%	±%
Democratic	James R. Roebuck Jr.	13,030	88.97	▼4.75
Republican	Ernest Adkins	1,615	11.03	▲4.75
Margin of victory		11,415	77.94	▼9.5
Turnout		14,645	100.0	

PA House election, 2016: Pennsylvania House, District 188
Party	Candidate	Votes	%	±%
Democratic	James R. Roebuck Jr.	26,898	100.0	
Margin of victory				
Turnout		26,898	100	
