= Alija Dumas =

American politician (born 1929)

Member of the Pennsylvania House of Representatives from the 188th district
- In office January 2, 1973 – November 30, 1979
- Preceded by: Lucien Blackwell
- Succeeded by: James Williams

Personal details
- Born: October 28, 1929 Alabama, U.S.
- Died: February 1, 2023 (aged 93) Philadelphia, Pennsylvania, U.S.
- Party: Democratic

Alija "Al" Dumas (October 28, 1929 – February 1, 2023) was an American politician who was a Democratic member of the Pennsylvania House of Representatives. He received an honorary street renaming in February 2020. He died in Philadelphia in 2023, aged 93.
