= Rick Krajewski =

American politician

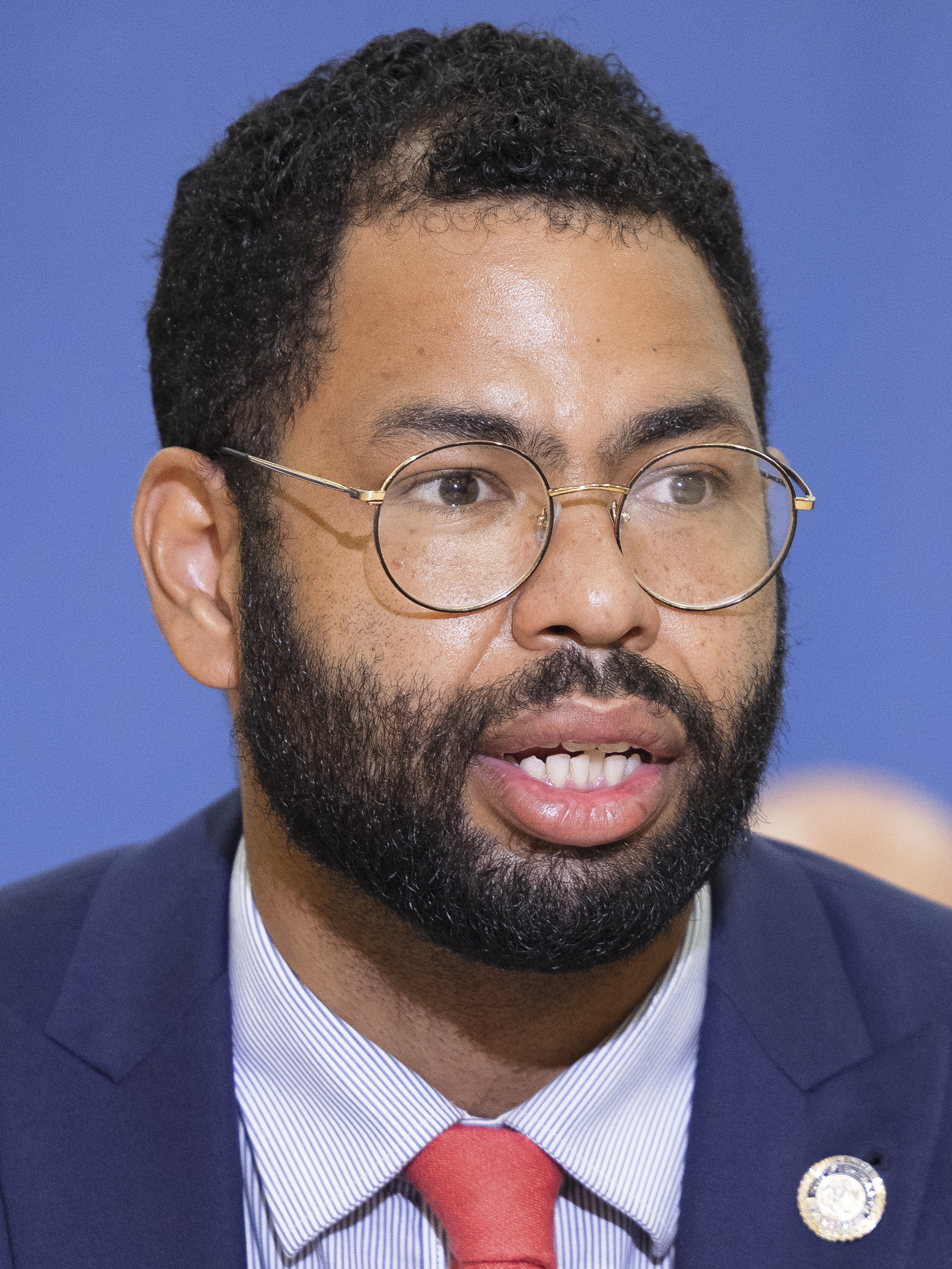

Member of the Pennsylvania House of Representatives from the 188th district
- Incumbent
- Assumed office January 5, 2021
- Preceded by: James R. Roebuck Jr.

Personal details
- Born: June 21, 1991 (age 35) New York City, New York, U.S.
- Party: Democratic
- Other political affiliations: Democratic Socialists of America
- Education: University of Pennsylvania
- Website: Official website

Rick Chester Krajewski (born June 21, 1991) is an American politician. He currently serves in the Pennsylvania House of Representatives representing the 188th legislative district. A member of the Democratic Party and the Democratic Socialists of America, Krajewski was first elected during the 2020 Pennsylvania House of Representatives election, when he primaried incumbent Democrat Jim Roebuck.

Krajewski grew up in the South Bronx and moved to West Philadelphia for college, graduating from the University of Pennsylvania with a degree in engineering in 2013. Prior to being elected to the state house he worked as a software developer, leaving that job in order to work full-time as an activist. Krajewski is active in the organization and field campaigning of the progressive activist group Reclaim Philadelphia.

== See also ==
- List of Democratic Socialists of America who have held office in the United States
