= Chaka Fattah =

American politician (born 1956)

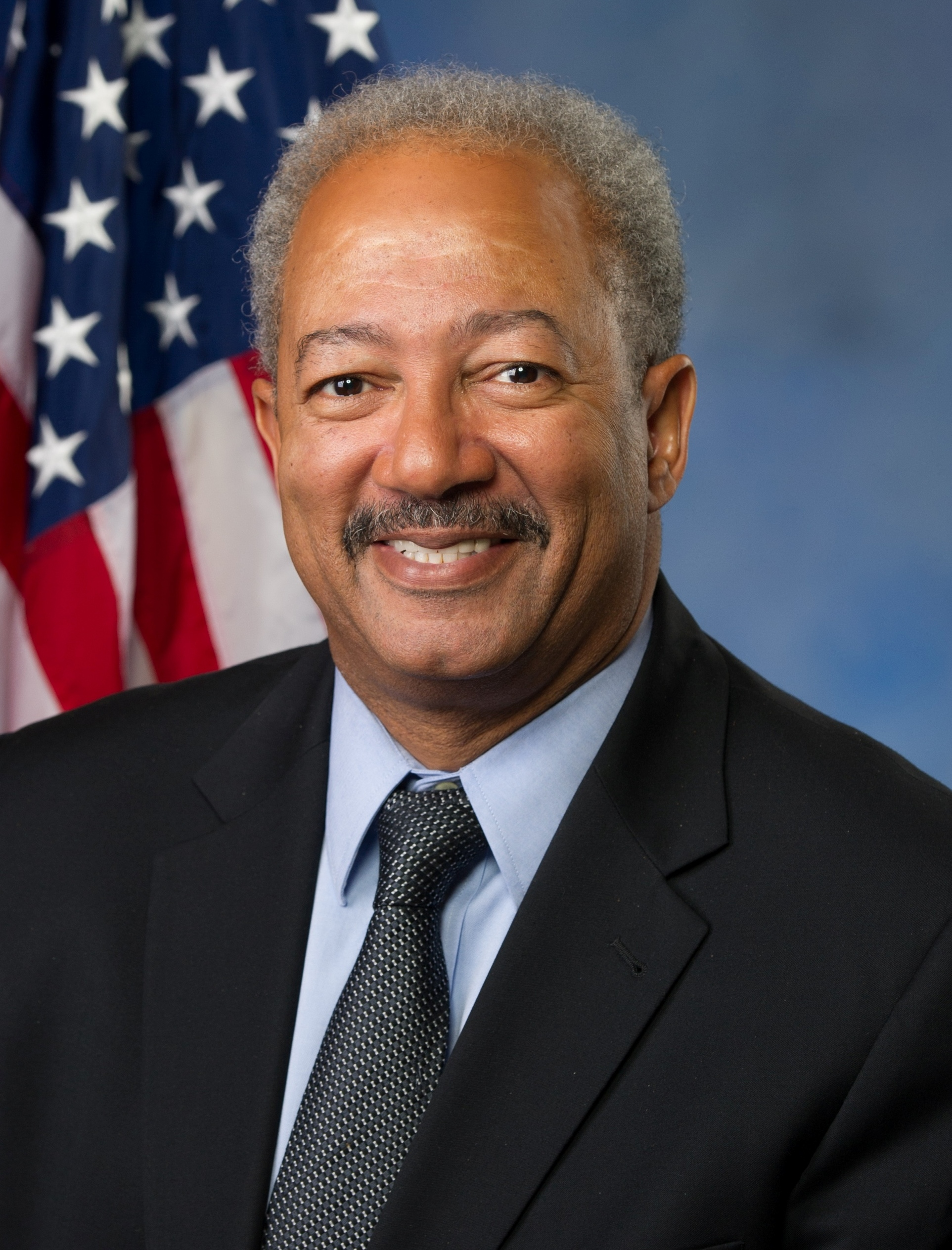
- Official portrait, 2014

Member of the U.S. House of Representatives from Pennsylvania's 2nd district
- In office January 3, 1995 – June 23, 2016
- Preceded by: Lucien Blackwell
- Succeeded by: Dwight Evans

Member of the Pennsylvania State Senate from the 7th district
- In office January 3, 1989 – August 31, 1994
- Preceded by: Freeman Hankins
- Succeeded by: Vincent Hughes

Member of the Pennsylvania House of Representatives from the 192nd district
- In office January 4, 1983 – November 30, 1988
- Preceded by: Nick Pucciarelli
- Succeeded by: Louise Bishop

Personal details
- Born: Arthur Wesley Davenport; November 21, 1956 (age 69) Philadelphia, Pennsylvania, U.S.
- Party: Democratic
- Spouse: Renee Chenault
- Children: 4
- Education: Community College of Philadelphia; University of Pennsylvania (BA, MPA)
- Fattah's voice Fattah supporting FY2014 appropriations. Recorded January 15, 2014

Chaka Fattah (born Arthur Wesley Davenport; November 21, 1956) is an American politician who served as a Democratic member of the U.S. House for Pennsylvania's 2nd congressional district from 1995 to 2016. The district included portions of North Philadelphia, South Philadelphia, and West Philadelphia along with Lower Merion Township in Montgomery County. He previously served in the Pennsylvania Senate and the Pennsylvania House of Representatives.

On July 29, 2015, Fattah and a group of associates were indicted on federal charges related to their alleged roles in a racketeering and influence peddling conspiracy. He was convicted on 23 counts of racketeering, fraud, and other corruption charges on June 21, 2016, and resigned two days later. On December 12, 2016, Fattah was sentenced to 10 years in prison. On August 9, 2018, the United States Court of Appeals for the Third Circuit in Philadelphia overturned Fattah's bribery convictions. On July 12, 2019, a Philadelphia judge sentenced Fattah to 10 years in federal prison for public corruption. He was released from prison in the summer of 2020.

== Early life and education ==
Arthur Davenport was born and raised in Philadelphia, to Russell and Frances Davenport as the fourth of six sons. His father was a sergeant in the United States Army and his mother was an editor for the Philadelphia Tribune. His parents divorced when he was young, and his mother soon remarried to a man she met at a national conference on black power in 1968. Following this conference, his mother and her new husband decided to change their family name to Fattah. They would change Arthur's name to Chaka, after a Zulu king. His mother and stepfather's social activism strongly influenced Fattah's political development.

His adoptive father, David Fattah, and mother, Falaka Fattah (born Frances Brown, also known as "Queen Mother" Falaka Fattah), are community activists in West Philadelphia, where they are building an "urban Boys' Town" through their organization, the House of Umoja. He has five brothers.

Fattah attended Overbrook High School and the Community College of Philadelphia. He earned a Bachelor of Arts in business and economics from the University of Pennsylvania. He is a member of Alpha Phi Alpha fraternity. In 1984, Fattah completed the Program for Senior Executives in State and Local Government at Harvard University's John F. Kennedy School of Government. In May 1986, he received his master's degree in governmental administration from the University of Pennsylvania's Fels Institute of Government.

Fattah was the recipient of numerous honors and awards including 10 honorary doctorates and the University of Pennsylvania's Fels Institute of Government Distinguished Alumni Achievement Award. Time magazine named Fattah one of the 50 most promising leaders in the country.

== Pennsylvania General Assembly ==
Fattah served as a member of the Pennsylvania House of Representatives for the 192nd district from 1983 to 1988, and as a State Senator for the 7th district from 1988 to 1994.

In 1987, Fattah founded the Graduate Opportunity Initiative Conference, an annual three-day informational and scholarship conference which aims to significantly increase the enrollment of under-represented graduate students studying Science, Technology, Engineering and Math (STEM fields). The conference was designed to encourage minority students’ interest in STEM graduate and professional schools.

== U.S. House of Representatives ==
=== Elections ===
In 1991, State Senator Fattah decided to run for Pennsylvania's 2nd congressional district in the special election that was held after Democratic U.S. Congressman William Gray decided to resign. On November 5, 1991, City Councilman Lucien Edward Blackwell won the election with a plurality of 39% of the vote defeating Fattah (28%), John F. White (28%), and Nadine Smith-Bulford (5%).

In 1994, Fattah decided to challenge Blackwell in the Democratic primary. He defeated the incumbent 58%–42%. He won the general election with 86% of the vote. After that, he was re-elected every two years with at least 86% of the vote. He was never challenged in the Democratic primary until 2016, when he lost to Dwight E. Evans.

=== Tenure ===
Fattah represented the 2nd district in Pennsylvania, an overwhelmingly Democratic district, in the United States House of Representatives from 1995 to 2016. Fattah endorsed Barack Obama for president in 2008.

==== GEAR Up and education ====
Fattah was the architect of the Gaining Early Awareness and Readiness for Undergraduate Programs.

In his first years in the U.S. House of Representatives, Fattah introduced and passed into law Gaining Early Awareness and Readiness for Undergraduate Programs (GEAR UP), a college awareness and preparedness program. Since its inception, more than $4 billion in federal funds have been distributed to assist 12 million students in 50 states, Puerto Rico, the District of Columbia, and U.S. territories. Fattah sponsored H.R. 4207, American Dream Accounts Act which would authorize the Department of Education to award three-year competitive grants to support partnerships that provide financial support and preparation for low-income students as they plan for their college education. The bill is co-sponsored in the U. S. Senate by Senator Chris Coons of Delaware, Senator Marco Rubio of Florida, and Senator Jeff Bingaman of New Mexico. Specifically the legislation creates personal online accounts for students that monitor higher education readiness and includes a college savings account. The accounts follow students from school to school and through college. Parents can grant vested stakeholders (including counselors, teachers, coaches, mentors, and others) access to the account to update student information, monitor progress, and provide college preparatory support.

Fattah introduced bills targeting the equity of resource allocation within and between school districts. In 2002, he introduced the "Student Bill of Rights", H.R. 2451. The measure called for States to provide highly effective teachers, early childhood education, college prep curricula and equitable instructional resources to all students who attend public schools. Current law requires that schools within the same district provide comparable educational services; this bill would extend that basic protection to the State level by requiring comparability across school districts.

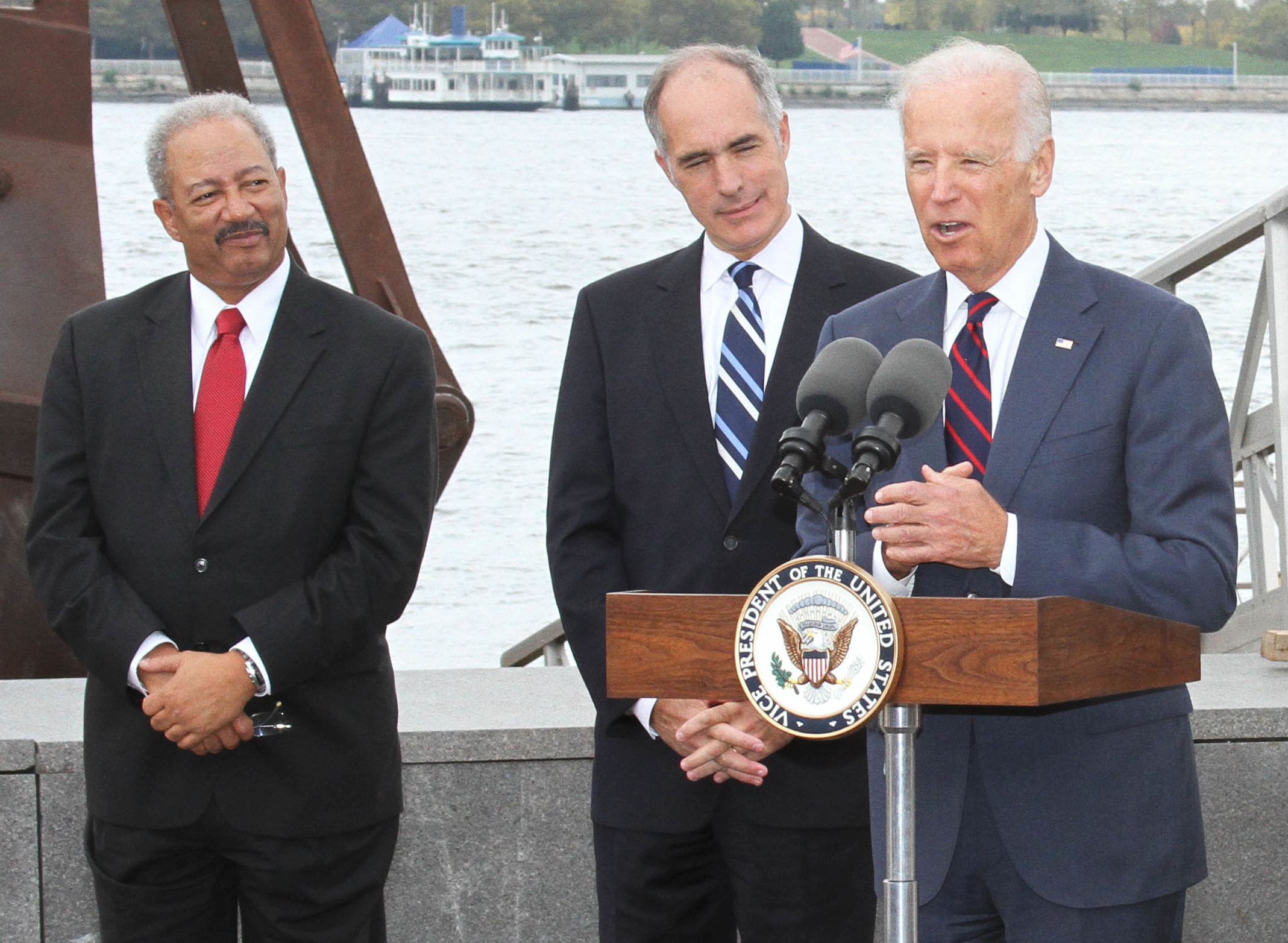
Fattah with Senator Bob Casey Jr. and then-Vice President Joe Biden in 2014

The ESEA Fiscal Fairness Act, H.R. 5071 – amends the Elementary and Secondary Education Act to requires school districts to equalize the real dollars spent among all schools within its jurisdiction – with the imperative to raise the resources allotted to schools in the poorest neighborhoods to meet those in well-off schools – before receiving federal aid.

Fattah introduced "Communities Committed to College", H.R. 1579. The legislation provides a 50% tax credit to donors who contribute to qualifying scholarship trusts that are recognized and registered with the Secretary of the Treasury.

He also wrote the legislation for the American Opportunity Tax Credit (AOTC). The tax credit assists any full-time college or university student or their families that claim the credit. Since 2011, it has assisted 4.5 million students and their families. AOTC provides up to $2500 tax credit for families to assist them with the cost of college. The credit is unique in that families under a set income without a tax liability are eligible for a tax rebate. President Obama has called for making the tax credit permanent. Outside of legislative work Fattah has created a few local education initiatives for Philadelphia and Pennsylvania families as a state legislator and in cooperation with state and municipal governments, including the CORE scholars program and the annual Grad Conference.

College Opportunity Resources for Education (CORE) is an initiative providing almost $27 million in last-dollar scholarships to over 18,000 students. The program encourages the students to participate in service to the local community and provides technical assistance to the families of program participants ensuring that they apply for educational assistance programs (Pell Grants, PHEAA grants, etc.) offered by the state and federal government.

A report issued by the National Student Clearinghouse concluded that participants in CORE were more likely than their fellow non-CORE classmates to complete their college education in four years.

==== Youth mentoring ====
Fattah was the lead Democrat responsible for the funding of the U.S. Department of Justice and the U.S. Attorney General. Since 2011, Congressman Farrah was able to negotiate an increase of $30M to investment in DOJ programs that fund groups including the Boys & Girls Clubs of America and Big Brothers Big Sisters of America.

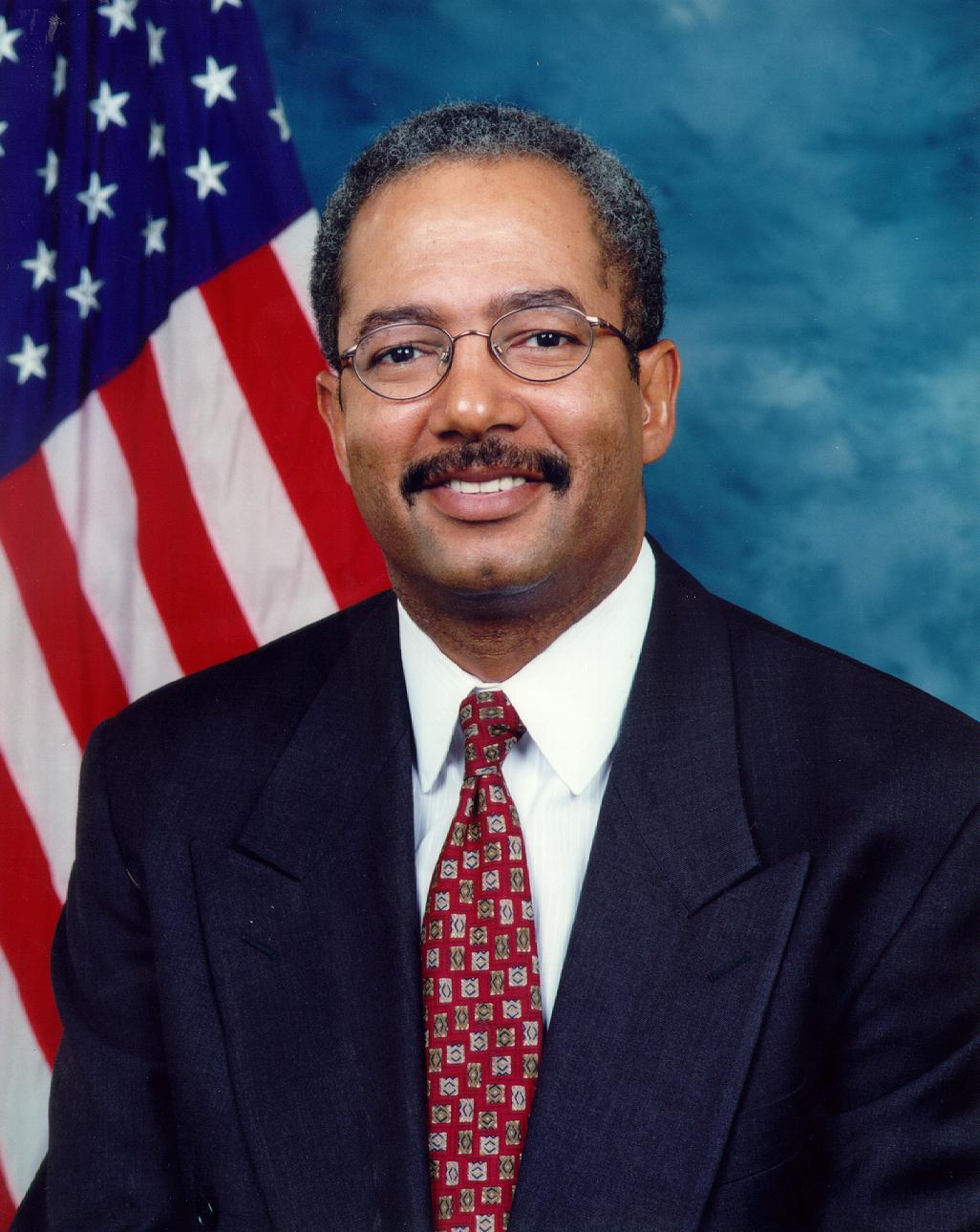
Fattah in 2002

In 2012, Fattah negotiated a partnership between FIRST and Boys & Girls Clubs of America to provide robotics programs to 4 million youth by 2015.

==== Neuroscience ====
Fattah was the lead Democrat responsible for funding some of the largest science agencies in the federal system (NASA, NSF, Office of Science and Technology Policy (OSTP). In December 2011, Fattah through his role on the Appropriations Committee, directed the OSTP to establish an Interagency Working Group on Neuroscience (IWGN). Housed within the White House and chartered on June 20, 2012, the IWGN convenes representatives across the Federal government to make recommendations about the future of neuroscience research.

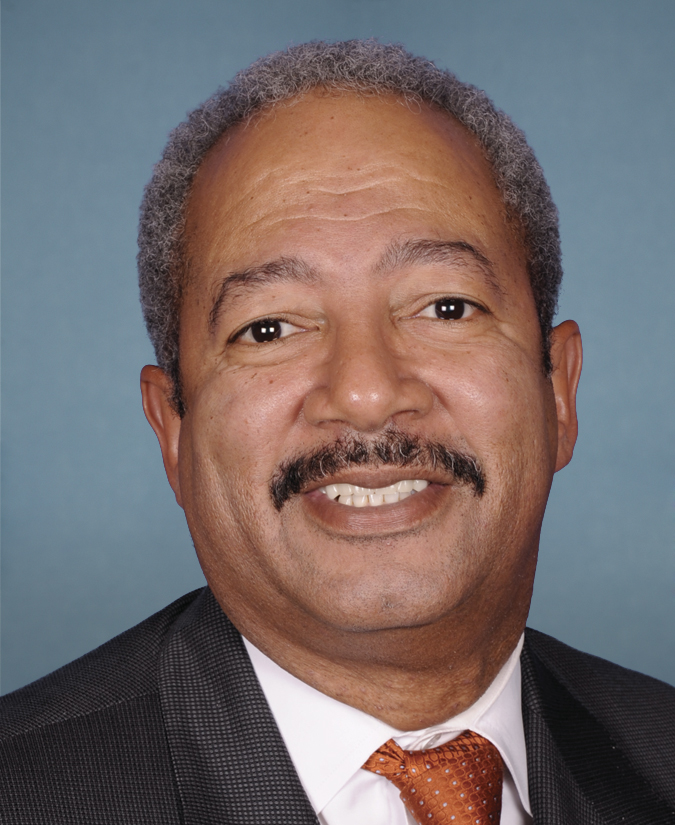
Fattah in 2013

The Fattah Neuroscience Initiative is a policy initiative designed to make major progress understanding the human brain by intensifying, in a collaborative fashion, federal research efforts across brain disease, disorder, injury, cognition and development. The initiative aims to coordinate Federal research across agencies and draw upon public-private partnerships and the world of academia. The initiative promotes research and discovery across brain cognition, development, disease and injury.

==== Manufacturing ====
Fattah states that his priority is ensuring that small and medium businesses have the tools they need to prosper in an increasingly competitive global marketplace. He is the lead Democrat responsible for funding the Department of Commerce and the Office of the U.S. Trade Representative. In his role on the Appropriations Committee, Fattah has advocated to $128 million in funding for the Manufacturing Extension Partnership, a program that assists small and mid-sized manufacturers create and retain jobs, increase profits, and save time and money. He is also an advocate for the SelectUSA program, an initiative that encourages U.S. businesses operating off-shore to return to the U.S. and promote the U.S. marketplace.

==== Cooperative development ====
Fattah was considered a “true champion” of the co-op movement by the American Co-op Association.

In May 2013, Fattah introduced the Creating Jobs through Cooperatives Act (HR 2437). This legislation will provide means to catalyze cooperative development, provide tools to entrepreneurs to bring cooperative to their communities, partner with financial institutions to provide grants a loans to developing businesses, offer technical training and professional development. His bill calls for $25 million federal investment and technical assistance to cooperatives through a new National Cooperative Development Center. The bill has national support from co-op and EOB advocates and members. Co-ops have a broad base and connection to community in the Philadelphia area.

In November 2013, Fattah was invited to attend as Keynote speaker at the Annual Cooperatives Conference, hosted by the NCBA. The conference brought together national leaders in cooperative development to share best practices to create powerful change for their organizations.

=== Sponsored legislation ===
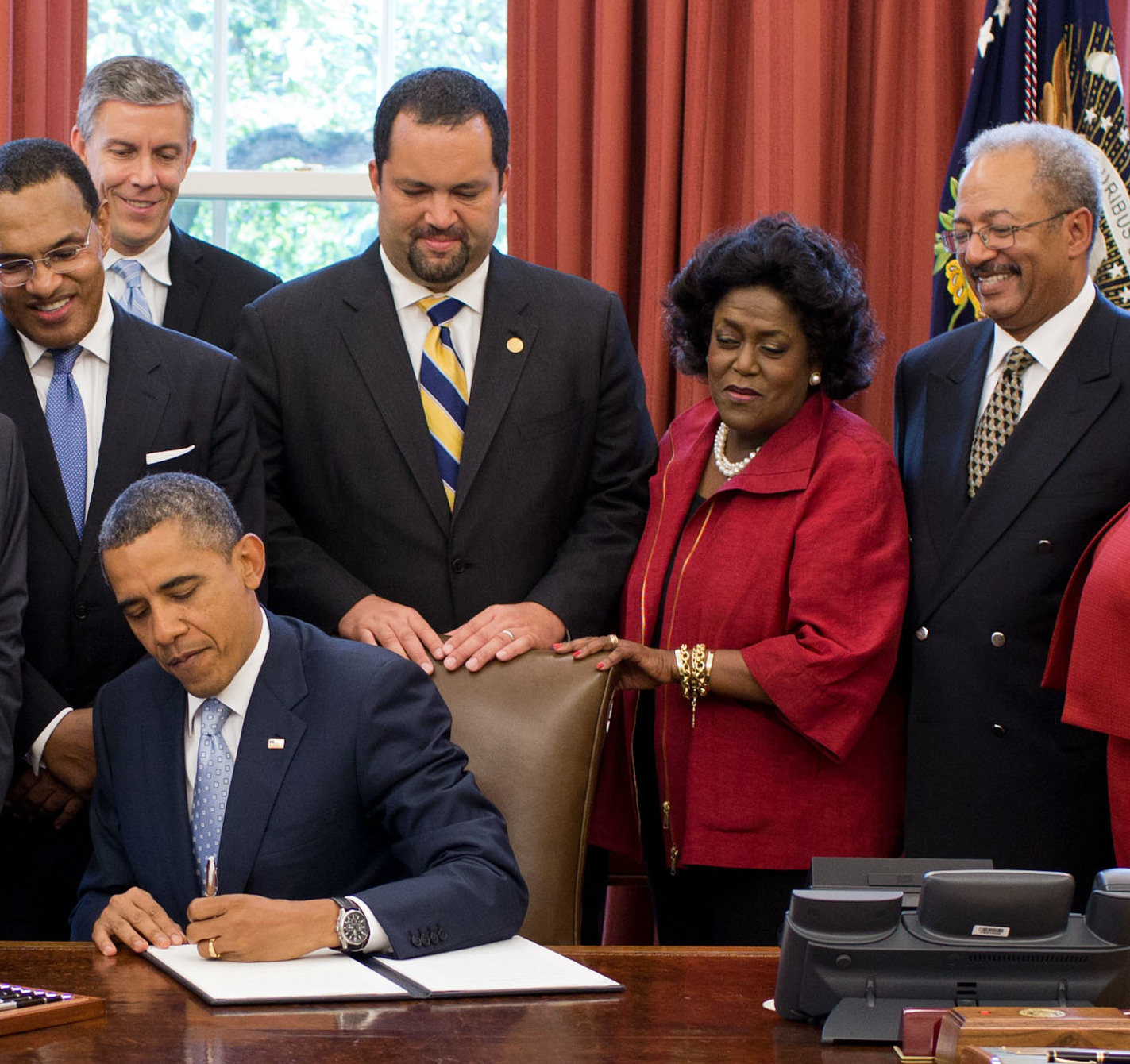
Fattah with President Barack Obama at the signing of an executive order in 2012

As a member of Pennsylvania's state House Fattah wrote and passed into law Pennsylvania's Homeowners Emergency Mortgage Assistance Program (HEMAP). HEMAP is a loan program designed to protect Pennsylvanians who, through no fault of their own, are financially unable to make their mortgage payments and are in danger of losing their homes to foreclosure. Started in 1983 by Pennsylvania's Act 91 of 1983, it was the only one of its kind until 2010 when Fattah added language to the Dodd Frank bill to provide similar assistance, to homeowners nationwide. The Emergency Homeowners Loan Program provides up to 24 months of assistance, through bridge loans, for distressed homeowners and is a scaled-up version of the HEMAP program.

In 2013, Fattah served as a vice chair on the House Gun and Violence Taskforce, a taskforce created under the direction of House Democratic Leader Nancy Pelosi. The taskforce included both liberal and conservative Democrats, gun owners and Representatives from various cities. Fattah received an F rating from the NRA Political Victory Fund and an A+ rating from the Coalition on Gun Violence and the Brady Campaign to Prevent Gun Violence for his positions on gun control.

Since 2006, Fattah has "pioneered gun-buyback programs" in Philadelphia with the Philadelphia Police. The program offers Philadelphians the chance to exchange firearms for vouchers for groceries or other goods.

In 2004, Fattah introduced a bill titled the "Transform America Transaction Fee", (H.R. 3759) which proposed to have the U.S. Treasury conduct a one-year feasibility study of a 1 percent transaction fee imposed on transactions made at any financial institution. He touted the possibility that such a system would bring in so much money it would allow for greatly increased federal spending, saying the "excess funds" would "provide universal health care, support an equitable public school finance system, and fund economic development in urban and rural areas", in addition to extinguishing the national debt and eliminating all other federal taxes. The bill died without attracting any co-sponsor. In 2005, Fattah introduced the bill again with H.R. 1601, and again in 2007 with H.R. 2130 which had a single cosponsor, Democratic Rep. Brian Baird of Washington. Both bills died without any action being taken. In 2009, Fattah introduced a fourth bill to require having a study conducted, H.R. 1703, which attracted no cosponsors. On February 23, 2010, Fattah reintroduced the bill as the "Debt Free America Act", (H.R. 4646) which proposed to repeal the federal income tax and replace it with a 1 percent "transaction tax" on every financial transaction – whether paid by cash, credit card or any form of financial transfer, the only exception being transactions involving the purchase or sale of stock. The latest bill places more focus on eliminating the federal debt. Fattah has also added a 1 percent tax credit designed to eliminate the impact of the measure on couples making less than $250,000 a year. As of September 5, 2010, none of the House committees have scheduled any action on the latest bill.

In 2005, Fattah opposed the War in Iraq and supported Congressman John Murtha's call for troop withdrawal. He publicly supported the "Bring Our Troops Home and Iraq Sovereignty Act" a bill that called for bringing the troops home within six months and transitioning the Iraqis to self-government.

=== Committee assignments ===
- Committee on Appropriations
  - Subcommittee on Commerce, Justice, Science, and Related Agencies (Ranking Member)
  - Subcommittee on Energy and Water Development

== 2007 unsuccessful mayoral campaign ==
In November 2006, he declared his candidacy for Mayor of Philadelphia, where two-term incumbent Mayor John F. Street was barred from re-election by term limits, amid pressure from Democratic voters to keep his Congressional seat to maintain a Philadelphia representative on the powerful Appropriations Committee in the House. His candidacy announcement took place next to the recently completed Microsoft School of the Future in the city's Parkside neighborhood to emphasize his campaign platform of better educational opportunities for city youth.

After emerging as a mayoral candidate, Fattah came under fire from the Philadelphia Fraternal Order of Police for his repeated calls to grant a new trial to Mumia Abu-Jamal, who was convicted of murdering police officer Daniel Faulkner in 1981; he also was criticized for possibly unethical campaign spending, based on new campaign finance rules adopted by the city of Philadelphia. The Fattah campaign defended itself, claiming that it had followed less restrictive federal rules in spending the money, but eventually returned a portion of the excess contributions to the exploratory committee following a settlement with the city's Board of Ethics. Fattah eventually came in fourth in the Democratic primary, close behind fellow Congressman Bob Brady but well behind former city councilman Michael Nutter, who went on to win the fall general election handily.

== Federal indictment and conviction ==
In August 2014, Fattah's longtime aide and close confidant Gregory Naylor pled guilty to federal charges in a complex money laundering scheme used to hide an illegal million-dollar loan that a candidate, unnamed in that indictment, received for his failed mayoral campaign in 2007. The loan was paid back using federal grant money intended for nonprofit organizations affiliated with Fattah. A subsequent Philadelphia Daily News investigation revealed that nonprofits receiving federal funding and connected to Fattah paid out over $5.8 million to Fattah allies and alleged that many of these payments were ethically dubious.

On July 29, 2015, Fattah and four of his associates, Bonnie Bowser, Karen Nicholas, Herbert Verderman and Robert Brand were indicted for their alleged roles in a racketeering conspiracy involving several schemes that were intended to further the political and financial interests of the defendants and others by, among other tactics, misappropriating hundreds of thousands of dollars of federal, charitable and campaign funds. The FBI further alleged that Fattah accepted an $18,000 bribe from a man seeking an ambassadorship.

The trial was originally scheduled for May 2, 2016, but in April a judge had the date pushed back to May 16 to give the defendants time to review the excess of more than 100,000 documents accrued by the prosecution.

On June 21, 2016, Fattah was convicted of all charges, including racketeering conspiracy, bribery, bank fraud, mail fraud, money laundering, making false statements to a financial institution, and falsification of records. Initially, he stated he would not leave office until October when he was due to be sentenced, but subsequently announced his immediate resignation from Congress two days later on June 23. Just days later, the U.S. Supreme Court issued its decision in McDonnell v. United States which altered the legal definition of bribery to exclude "pay for access". On the basis of this ruling, Fattah appealed his conviction in October 2016, placing his sentencing on hold.

On December 12, 2016, Fattah was sentenced to 10 years in prison. He reported for prison at Federal Correctional Institution, McKean near Lewis Run, Pennsylvania on January 25, 2017.

On August 9, 2018, the U.S. Court of Appeals for the Third Circuit in Philadelphia overturned Fattah's bribery convictions.

The Court of Appeals remanded for a new trial as to certain bribery and money laundering counts, concluding that the jury had not been properly instructed regarding "official acts" in a bribery context. (The government thereafter announced its intention not to retry those counts.) With regard to the government's cross-appeal, the Court of Appeals reinstated certain counts that had been dismissed by the District Court post-trial. The case was then remanded for resentencing.

For these additional counts, Fattah was again sentenced to 10 years of incarceration on July 12, 2019.

Fattah was released from prison on June 8, 2020.

== Fattah Neuroscience Global Advisors ==
In December 2016, Fattah founded the consulting firm, Fattah Neuroscience Global Advisors (FNGA). FNGA's mission is to work with universities, non-profits and private corporations to advance brain science and research throughout the globe. According to Fattah, he founded FNGA because "I still have to provide for my family. I could just go give speeches, but talking about things is different than going out and doing them." Fattah, who is the longest serving African-American in Congress from Pennsylvania and the former chair of the Congressional Black Caucus Foundation, was known for having a particular legislative focus on advancing neuroscience research. He served as the Ranking Member of the United States House Appropriations Subcommittee on Commerce, Justice, Science, and Related Agencies. Fattah championed the Fattah Neuroscience Initiative, a component of H.R. 933, which directed the White House Office of Science and Technology Policy to "work with all relevant stakeholders to consider how incentives could hasten the development of new prevention and treatment options for neurological diseases and disorders, and to recommend options for such incentives."

FNGA announced a five-year partnership with the Brain Wellness Initiative of Africa in January 2022. Together, the two organizations will work to improve and advance brain research on the continent of Africa. In addition, they aim to advance the research of African brain scientists throughout the globe. Since 2021, FNGA has hosted virtual forums on brain research.

Fattah also serves as Chairman of the National Brain Council, an advocacy project with the goal of increasing federal funding towards brain research by 100%.

== Electoral history ==
Pennsylvania's 2nd congressional district, 2016
Party	Candidate	Votes	%
Democratic	Dwight E. Evans	75,515	42.3
Democratic	Chaka Fattah (incumbent)	61,518	34.4
Democratic	Brian Gordon	23,655	13.2
Democratic	Dan Muroff	18,016	10.1
Total votes		178,704	100.0

Pennsylvania's 2nd congressional district, 2014
Party	Candidate	Votes	%
Democratic	Chaka Fattah (incumbent)	181,141	87.7
Republican	Armond James	25,397	12.3
Total votes		206,538	100.0

Pennsylvania's 2nd congressional district, 2012
Party	Candidate	Votes	%
Democratic	Chaka Fattah (incumbent)	318,176	89.3
Republican	Robert Mansfield	33,381	9.4
Independent	James Foster	4,829	1.3
Total votes		356,386	100.0

Pennsylvania's 2nd congressional district election, 2010
Party	Candidate	Votes	%
Democratic	Chaka Fattah	182,800	89.3
Republican	Rick Hellberg	21,907	10.7
Total votes		204,707	100

Pennsylvania's 2nd congressional district election, 2008
Party	Candidate	Votes	%
Democratic	Chaka Fattah	276,870	90.8
Republican	Adam Lang	24,714	9.2
Total votes		311,336	100

Philadelphia mayoral primary election, 2007
Party	Candidate	Votes	%	±%
Democratic	Michael Nutter	106,805	36.6	
Democratic	Thomas J. Knox	71,731	24.6	
Democratic	Bob Brady	44,474	15.3	
Democratic	Chaka Fattah	44,301	15.2	
Democratic	Dwight Evans	22,782	7.8	
Democratic	Queena Bass	950	0.3	
Democratic	Jesus White	437	0.1	

- 2006 Race for U.S. House
  - Chaka Fattah (D) (inc.), 89%
  - Michael Gessner (R), 9%
- 2004 Race for U.S. House
  - Chaka Fattah (D) (inc.), 88%
  - Stewart Bolno (R), 12%
- 2002 Race for U.S. House
  - Chaka Fattah (D) (inc.), 88%
  - Tom Dougherty (R), 12%
- 2000 Race for U.S. House
  - Chaka Fattah (D) (inc.), 98%
  - Ken Krawchuk (L), 2%
- 1998 Race for U.S. House
  - Chaka Fattah (D) (inc.), 86%
  - Anne Marie Mulligan (R), 14%
- 1996 Race for U.S. House
  - Chaka Fattah (D) (inc.), 88%
  - Larry Murphy (R), 12%
- 1994 Race for U.S. House
  - Chaka Fattah (D), 86%
  - Lawrence Watson (R), 14%

== Personal life ==
Fattah is married to his third wife, Renee Chenault-Fattah, a former Philadelphia television news broadcaster on WCAU-TV (NBC 10). They have one daughter, Chandler Fattah. He is stepfather to her daughter Cameron Chenault. With other women, he is the father of another daughter, Frances ("Fran"), and one son, Chaka Fattah Jr., known as "Chip", who was convicted of felony bank and tax fraud in February 2016.

In 2002, he was named to the PoliticsPA list of Best Dressed Legislators, noting his "excellence in haberdashery".

== See also ==
- List of African-American United States representatives
- List of American federal politicians convicted of crimes

U.S. House of Representatives
Preceded by Lucien Blackwell	Member of the U.S. House of Representatives from Pennsylvania's 2nd congressional district 1995–2016	Succeeded by Dwight E. Evans
U.S. order of precedence (ceremonial)
Preceded by Curt Weldon as Former U.S. Representative	Order of precedence of the United States as Former U.S. Representative	Succeeded by Joe Pitts as Former U.S. Representative
