= Charles R. Weiner =

American judge & politician (1922–2005)

Senior Judge of the United States District Court for the Eastern District of Pennsylvania
- In office December 31, 1988 – November 9, 2005

Judge of the United States District Court for the Eastern District of Pennsylvania
- In office June 14, 1967 – December 31, 1988
- Appointed by: Lyndon B. Johnson
- Preceded by: Seat established by 80 Stat. 75
- Succeeded by: Ronald L. Buckwalter

Democratic Leader of the Pennsylvania Senate
- In office January 6, 1959 – November 30, 1962
- Preceded by: John Herman Dent
- Succeeded by: John H. Devlin

Member of the Pennsylvania Senate from the 7th district
- In office January 6, 1953 – June 28, 1967
- Preceded by: Maxwell S. Rosenfeld
- Succeeded by: Freeman Hankins

Personal details
- Born: June 27, 1922 Philadelphia, Pennsylvania, U.S.
- Died: November 9, 2005 (aged 83) Doylestown, Pennsylvania, U.S.
- Party: Democratic
- Education: University of Pennsylvania (AB, MA, PhD); Temple University (LLB)

Charles R. Weiner (June 27, 1922 – November 9, 2005) was an American politician and judge from Pennsylvania. He served as a Democratic member of the Pennsylvania State Senate for the 7th district from 1953 to 1967 and as a United States district judge of the United States District Court for the Eastern District of Pennsylvania from 1967 to 2005 including as senior judge from 1988 to 2005.

== Education and career ==
Born in Philadelphia, Weiner was in the United States Navy during World War II, from 1941 to 1945. He thereafter received an Artium Baccalaureus degree from the University of Pennsylvania in 1947, a Bachelor of Laws from Temple University Beasley School of Law in 1949, a Master of Arts degree from the University of Pennsylvania in 1967, and a Doctor of Philosophy from the University of Pennsylvania Law School in 1976. He was an assistant district attorney of Philadelphia County from 1952 to 1953, and was a member of the Pennsylvania Senate for the 7th district from 1953 to 1967, serving as minority floor leader from 1959 to 1960 and from 1963 to 1964, and as majority floor leader from 1961 to 1962. During this time, he maintained a private practice in Philadelphia.

=== Federal judicial service ===
On May 24, 1967, Weiner was nominated by President Lyndon B. Johnson to a new seat on the United States District Court for the Eastern District of Pennsylvania created by 80 Stat. 75. He was confirmed by the United States Senate on June 12, 1967, and received his commission on June 14, 1967. He was a member of the Judicial Panel on Multidistrict Litigation from 1978 to 1983 and a Judge of the Special Railroad Court from 1982 to 1997. He assumed senior status on December 31, 1988, serving in that capacity until his death on November 9, 2005, in Doylestown, Pennsylvania.

== See also ==
- List of Jewish American jurists

Legal offices
Preceded by Seat established by 80 Stat. 75	Judge of the United States District Court for the Eastern District of Pennsylvania; 1967–1988	Succeeded by Ronald L. Buckwalter
