= Clarence Wolf =

American politician

Member of the Pennsylvania State Senate
- In office 1909–1912
- Constituency: District 7

Personal details
- Born: April 9, 1860 Philadelphia, Pennsylvania, U.S.
- Died: July 23, 1937 (aged 77) Philadelphia, Pennsylvania, U.S.
- Party: Republican
- Occupation: Banker; manufacturer; politician
- Known for: Founder and president of Wolf Brothers & Co.; president of Hercules Cement Corporation; Pennsylvania State Senator

Clarence Wolf (April 9, 1860 – July 23, 1937) was a Jewish-American banker, manufacturer, and politician from Pennsylvania.

== Life ==
Wolf was born on April 9, 1860, in Philadelphia, Pennsylvania, the son of Elias Wolf and Amelia Mayer.

After finishing public school, Wolf worked in the printing business and in envelope manufacturing. He later became a banker and a director of several manufacturing concerns. He was a presidential elector in 1900. In 1908, he was elected to the Pennsylvania State Senate as a Republican, representing District 7. He was in the Senate for two terms, from 1909 to 1912.

Wolf founded the private banking house Wolf Brothers & Co. with his four brothers in 1899 and served as its president. He was president of the Hercules Cement Corporation and a director of the National Edgebox Company, the Standard Machine Company, and the Superior Zinc Corporation. He was on the board of directors of the Philadelphia Rapid Transit Company from 1907 to 1909 and served as one of its vice presidents. He was also a member of the firm Wolf Bros. since 1896 and the Philadelphia Stock Exchange.

Wolf was president of the Mercantile Club and the Pennsylvania Society of State Senators, an honorary director of Congregation Rodeph Shalom, and a member of the Freemasons, the Elks, and the Third Regiment of the Pennsylvania National Guard. His first wife died in 1909, and his second wife died in 1916. His two surviving children were Clarence Wolf Jr. and Benjamin Wolf 2nd.

Wolf died in the Jewish Hospital from a heart ailment on July 23, 1937. He was buried in Mt. Sinai Cemetery in Philadelphia.
