= James R. Roebuck Jr. =

American politician

Member of the Pennsylvania House of Representatives from the 188th district
- In office June 3, 1985 – November 30, 2020
- Preceded by: James Williams
- Succeeded by: Rick Krajewski

Personal details
- Born: February 12, 1945 Philadelphia, Pennsylvania
- Died: May 15, 2024 (aged 79)
- Party: Democratic
- Spouse: Cheryl Arrington (m. 1987–2016)
- Education: Virginia Union University, University of Virginia
- Profession: educator

James Randolph Roebuck Jr. (February 12, 1945 – May 15, 2024) was an American politician. He served as a Democratic member of the Pennsylvania House of Representatives for the 188th District from 1985 to 2020.

== Biography ==
Roebuck was born in Philadelphia and graduated from Central High School in 1963. He earned a bachelor's degree from Virginia Union University in 1966, followed by a Master's degree (1969) and Ph.D. (1977) from the University of Virginia. In 1969, he became the first African American president of the UVA Student Council.

Roebuck served as a lecturer (1970-1977) and assistant professor (1977-1984) of history at Drexel University. He then worked as a legislative assistant to Philadelphia Mayor Wilson Goode (1984-1985).

Following the death of James D. Williams, Roebuck won a special election on May 21, 1985 to represent the West Philadelphia-based 188th District in the Pennsylvania House of Representatives. He was sworn-in on June 3, 1985 and subsequently reelected for 17 more terms, serving for 35 years. During his time in office, Roebuck was the Democratic chairman of the House Education Committee and a member of the Pennsylvania Legislative Black Caucus.

In June 2020, Roebuck was defeated in the Democratic primary by Rick Krajewski.
