= Michael Horsey =

American politician

Michael J. Horsey

Member of the Pennsylvania House of Representatives from the 190th district
- In office January 3, 1995 – November 30, 2004
- Preceded by: Vincent Hughes
- Succeeded by: Thomas Blackwell

Personal details
- Born: November 22, 1949 (age 76) Philadelphia, Pennsylvania
- Party: Democratic
- Spouse: Lorna Denise
- Children: Michael Horsey, Lauren Horsey
- Education: Cheyney State College; Community College of Philadelphia; Penn State University
- Occupation: Lobbyist

Michael J. Horsey (born November 22, 1949) is a former Democratic member of the Pennsylvania House of Representatives.

== Biography ==
Born in Philadelphia, Pennsylvania on November 22, 1949, Horsey is a 1968 graduate of St. Thomas More High School in Philadelphia. He earned a degree from Cheyney State College in 1975, an Associate of Arts degree in Criminal Justice from Community College of Philadelphia in 1980, and a paralegal certification from Penn State University in 1983. He also attended classes at Antioch Law School.

He and his wife, Lorna Denise Horsey, have two children, Michael Horsey Jr., and Lauren Horsey, and also have three grandchildren, John, Jordan, Micah and Jada Cherry).

== Public service career ==
Prior to elective office, Horsey worked as a manager at the Philadelphia Parking Authority, as a 6th Ward Democratic leader, and as a Philadelphia public school teacher.

Horsey was first elected to represent the 190th legislative district in 1994. He was defeated in the 2004 Democratic primary by Thomas Blackwell.
