= Blue-collar scholar =

Term for academics from blue-collar background

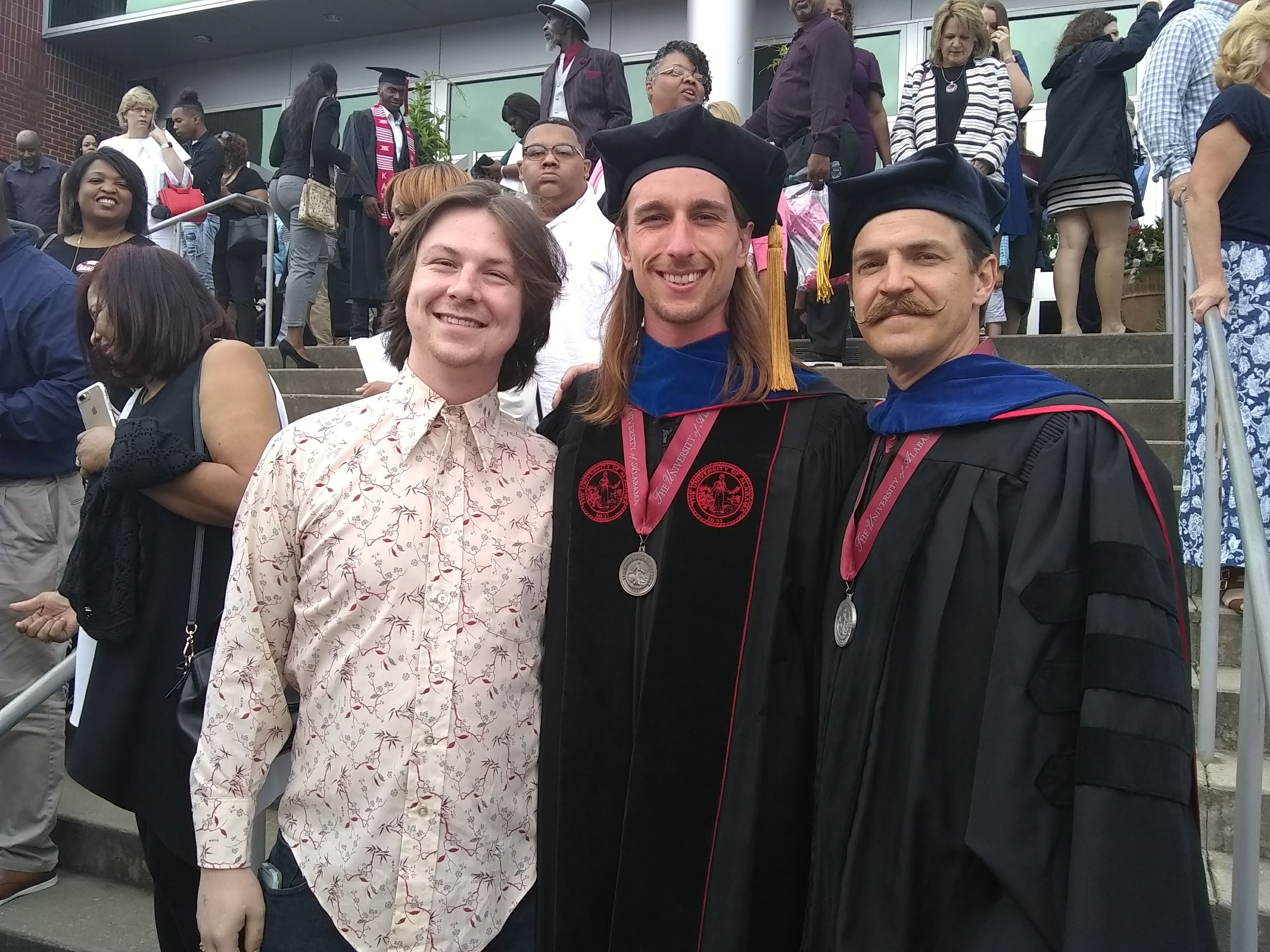
Blue-collar scholars celebrate a doctoral graduation

A blue-collar scholar or blue-collar academic is a person who comes from a family or background of blue-collar workers who enters into the study and training of higher education as an undergraduate student or is an academic doing scholarly work to make their professional living.

== Definition ==
A common term used in understanding students who come from working class, or blue-collar families, is a first-generation college student. These students are the first in their immediate family to attend a college or university. There are social impacts and struggles for students in higher-education who come from working-class families.

== Academics ==
In the case of blue-collar scholars who are professors, these people may have had previous careers that were defined by working-class principles or their parents have careers as blue-collar workers. The majority of academic faculty do not come from blue-collar backgrounds, and in a survey of over 7,000 professors across disciplines, one study found that the median family childhood income of these faculty is ~23% greater than the general population. In comparison to the general public, the study found that faculty are also 25 times more likely to have a parent who has a PhD, and 50 times more likely at elite universities.

== Programs to support blue-collar scholars ==
Ivy league schools, such as Harvard University, have mechanisms in place to attract and retain diverse students, and these include students from working-class families and first-generation college students. The University of Alabama has a program referred to Coca-Cola Scholars that provides financial support, mentorship, and organized curriculum to sustain and retain first-generation students.

== Value of blue-collar perspective ==
Johnny Saldaña, a blue-collar qualitative scholar, wrote his "redneck manifesto" to illustrate the value of taking a blue-collar perspective on scholarly activity. In his manuscript Saldaña examines how labels, methods, theories, questions, and "bein' ethical" can all be viewed from one's blue collar roots. Saldaña's self-described "rant" argues that traditional scholars, those coming from the ivory tower, should "bring it down a notch".

== Imposter syndrome ==
Research has found that first-generation college students are more likely to experience imposter syndrome than peers, and it is likely that graduate students and professors who stem from blue-collar roots may experience relevant insecurities in their work. One view is that those from blue-collar families may have lacked the encouragement for their goals because those ambitions did not align with family expectations. Blue-collars' positionality and perspectives stem from their upbringing and having parents who earned a living working in blue-collar or pink-collar type jobs. These may include parents who were police officers, engravers, post office workers, truck drivers, electricians, plumbers, school teachers, etc. The views and values of these professions do not always align with those views learned by blue-collar scholars that come from the ivory tower.

== Community focused research ==
Some blue-collar scholars argue their goal is to develop scholarly research that can be utilized to improve the lives of everyday people. One form of this work has been categorized as community engaged scholarship or community-based participatory research (CBPR), where partnerships are made with the participants of studies who can inform and guide the research through the entire process, and the findings of studies done by scholars will ultimately benefit the groups who were studied. Some forms of research that takes place in real-world settings has been dubbed, applied research, however the types of study designs and research published by applied research scholars, though practically based, does not always tap into the philosophies and belief systems of the working classes.
