= Pennsylvania's 7th Senate district =

American legislative district

Pennsylvania's 7th State Senate district
Senator
Vincent Hughes; D–Philadelphia
- Population (2021): 263,697

Pennsylvania State Senate District 7 includes parts of Montgomery County (parts of Conshohocken Borough and Whitemarsh Township) and Philadelphia County (parts of West, North, and Northwest Philadelphia, surrounding Fairmount Park). It is currently represented by Democrat Vincent Hughes.

== District profile ==
The district includes the following areas:

Montgomery County

- Conshohocken
- Whitemarsh Township

Philadelphia County

- Ward 04
- Ward 06
- Ward 12 [PART, Divisions 08, 11, 15, 16, 17, 22, 23 and 24]
- Ward 21
- Ward 24
- Ward 27 [PART, Divisions 03, 06, 11, 13 and 18]
- Ward 28
- Ward 34
- Ward 38
- Ward 44
- Ward 46 [PART, Divisions 07, 19, 22 and 23]
- Ward 52
- Ward 60 [PART, Divisions 01, 02, 03, 04, 05, 08, 09, 12, 13, 14, 15, 16 and 23]

== Senators ==
Representative	Party	Years	District home	Notes
George Weaver	Democratic-Republican	1815 – 1818		
Philip S. Markley	Democratic-Republican	1819 – 1821		U.S. Representative for Pennsylvania's 5th congressional district from 1823 to 1827. Attorney General of Pennsylvania from 1829 to 1830.
Matthew Henderson	Federalist	1821 – 1825		
John Hamilton	Jackson Democrat	1825 – 1827		
Frederick Hambright	Federalist	1827 – 1828		
John Robinson	Anti-Masonic	1831 – 1834		
Henry Hibshman	Anti-Masonic	1831 – 1836		
John Strohm	Anti-Masonic	1835 – 1836		Pennsylvania State Representative from 1832 to 1834. Pennsylvania State Senator for the 6th district from 1839 to 1842. U.S. Representative for Pennsylvania's 8th congressional district from 1845 to 1848.
John Harper	Anti-Masonic	1837 – 1838		Pennsylvania State Senator for the 8th district from 1835 to 1836
John Killinger	Anti-Masonic	1837 – 1840		
Levi Kline	Republican	1841 – 1844		
John Philipp Sanderson	Whig	1845 – 1848		
A. Herr Smith	Whig	1845 – 1848		U.S. Representative for Pennsylvania's 9th congressional district from 1873 to 1885
Joseph Konigmacher	Whig	1849 – 1850		
Daniel Stine	Whig	1849 – 1850		
Edward C. Darlington	Whig	1851 – 1854		
Esaias Kinzer	Whig	1853 – 1856		
John Weinland Killinger	Republican	1855 – 1856		Pennsylvania State Representative from 1850 to 1851. U.S. Representative for Pennsylvania's 10th congressional district from 1871 to 1875. U.S. Representative for Pennsylvania's 14th congressional district from 1877 to 1881.
Jacob G. Shuman	Whig and Republican	1855 – 1858		Shuman served as a Whig member of the Pennsylvania from 1855 to 1856 and as a Republican from 1857 to 1858
Christian Markle Straub	Democratic	1857 – 1858		U.S. Representative for Pennsylvania's 11th congressional district from 1853 to 1855
Bernard Reilly	Democratic	1861 – 1864		
George B. Schall	Democratic	1865 – 1866		
Robert S. Brown	Democratic	1867 – 1870		
Jesse W. Knight	Democratic	1873 – 1874		Pennsylvania State Senator for the 6th district from 1871 to 1872
Harman Yerkes	Democratic	1873 – 1875		
Hiram Horter	Republican	1875 – 1876		
John Cadwalader Grady	Republican	1877 – 1904		President pro tempore of the Senate in 1887 and 1889
John Parker	Greenback Labor	1879 – 1882		
James P. McNichol	Democratic	1905 – 1906		Pennsylvania State Senator for the 3rd district from 1907 to 1916
Clarence Wolf	Republican	1909 – 1912		
Augustus Felix Daix, Jr.	Republican	1913 – 1932		
Samuel Nelson Houston	Democratic	1927 – 1932		
Harry Shapiro	Democratic and Republican	1933 – 1944		Shapiro served as a Republican from 1933 to 1936 then as a Democrat from 1937 to 1944
Maxwell S. Rosenfeld	Democratic	1945 – 1952		
Charles R. Weiner	Democratic	1953 – 1967		Democratic leader of the Pennsylvania Senate from 1959 to 1962. Judge of the U.S. District Court of Eastern Pennsylvania from 1967 to 1988. Senior Judge of the U.S. District Court of Eastern Pennsylvania from 1988 to 2005.
Freeman Hankins	Democratic	1969 – 1988		Pennsylvania State Representative for the Philadelphia County district from 1961 to 1968. Died on December 31, 1988
Chaka Fattah	Democratic	1989 – 1994		Pennsylvania State Representative for the 192 district from 1983 to 1988. U.S. Representative for Pennsylvania's 2nd congressional district from 1995 to 2016. Convicted on 23 counts of racketeering, fraud and other corruption charges on June 21, 2016.
Vincent Hughes	Democratic	1994 – present		Pennsylvania State Representative for the 190th district from 1987-1994
