= Jannie Blackwell =

American politician (born 1945)

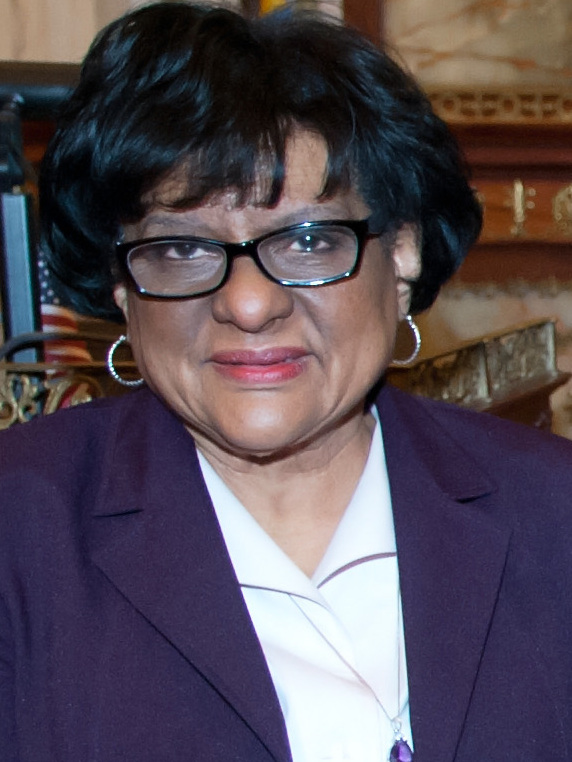

Member of the Philadelphia City Council from the 3rd District
- In office January 6, 1992 – January 6, 2020
- Preceded by: Lucien Blackwell
- Succeeded by: Jamie Gauthier

Personal details
- Born: July 15, 1945 (age 81) Philadelphia, Pennsylvania, US
- Party: Democratic
- Spouse: Lucien Blackwell
- Children: Thomas W. Blackwell

Jannie L. Blackwell (born July 15, 1945) is the Vice Chair of the Philadelphia Democratic Party and a former member of the Philadelphia City Council. She represented the Third District, which covers much of West Philadelphia and Southwest Philadelphia, including University City, from 1992 to 2020.

== Early life and career ==
Blackwell was born on July 15, 1945 and grew up in Philadelphia. She worked as a public school teacher before her career in politics.

== Political career ==
In 1991, Blackwell was elected to represent the Third District on the Philadelphia City Council, succeeding her husband, Lucien Blackwell, who had held the seat for 17 years.

Blackwell opposed certain provisions of pay-to-play and ethics reform bills proposed by then-Councilman Michael Nutter. During a 2005 hearing, she stated that minority contractors would be at a disadvantage in bidding for city work if required to disclose campaign contributions. As the lone councilmember to vote against the ethics reform package, she noted that placing onerous restrictions on political contributions from firms seeking work would benefit political candidates that are independently wealthy, and that people should be able to contribute to whomever they choose. Blackwell also initially opposed banning smoking in public places in the city.

In 2004, Blackwell introduced two bills that would give City Council the power to designate local historic districts, rather than having the process controlled by the city's Historical Commission. She has challenged the role of the University City District in representing citizens' interests over those of the University of Pennsylvania.

Blackwell was a member of the Philadelphia Housing Authority board. In 2010, Blackwell was the lone member of the PHA board to vote against terminating the contract of PHA Executive Director Carl R. Greene for his alleged sexual harassment of four female subordinates.

Blackwell was Ward Leader of the 46th Ward Democratic Executive Committee.

In the 2019 primary, Blackwell lost the Democratic nomination for her council seat in the Third District to Jamie Gauthier.

== Background ==
Ms. Blackwell is the widow of former U.S. Representative, State Representative, and City Councilman Lucien Blackwell. Her step-son, Thomas, was a former member of the Pennsylvania House of Representatives.

Philadelphia City Council
Preceded by Lucien Blackwell	Member of the Philadelphia City Council for the 3rd District; 1992–2020	Succeeded by Jamie Gauthier
