= Vincent Hughes =

American politician (born 1956)

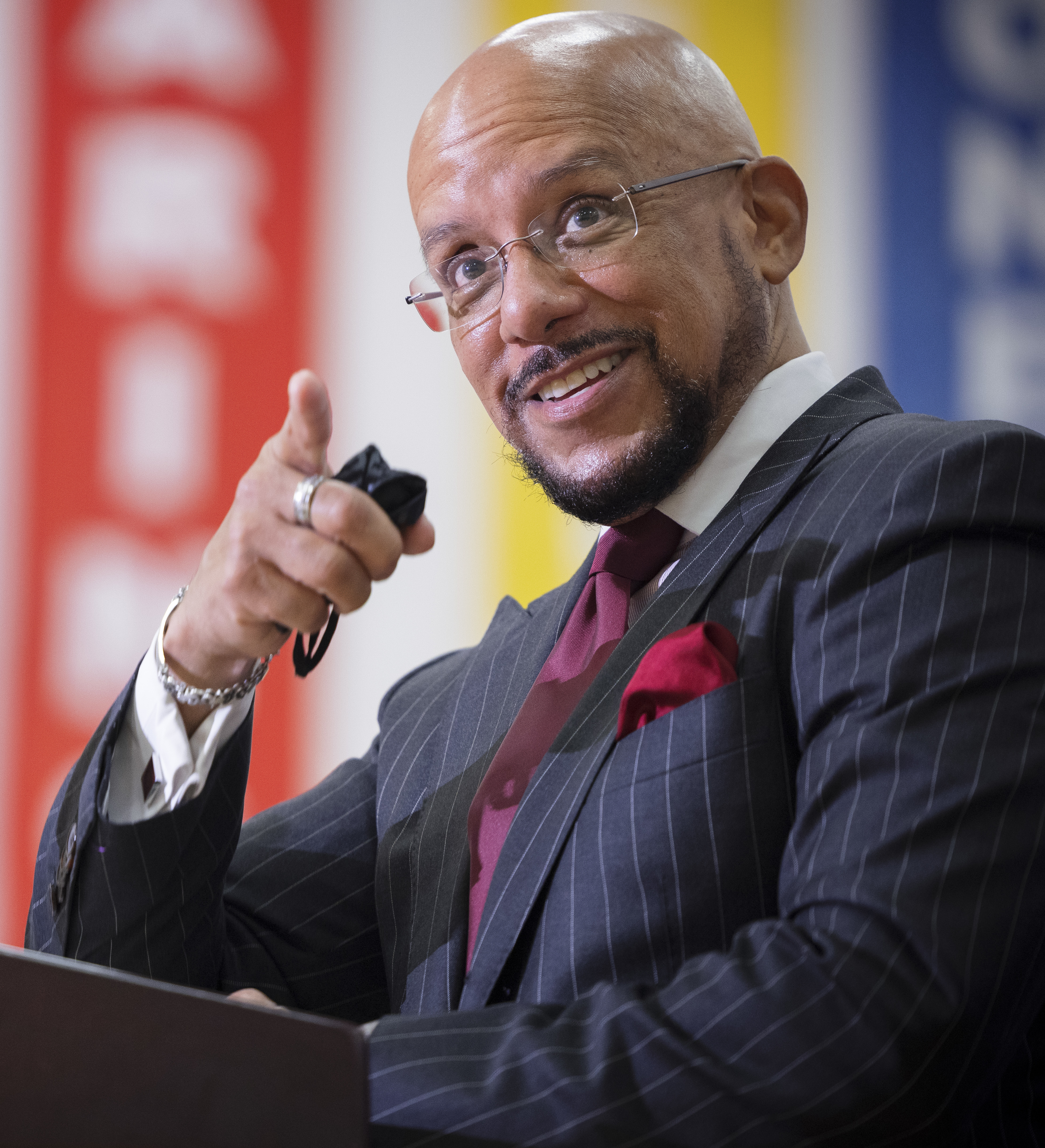
- Hughes in 2021

Member of the Pennsylvania Senate from the 7th district
- Incumbent
- Assumed office November 21, 1994
- Preceded by: Chaka Fattah

Member of the Pennsylvania House of Representatives from the 190th district
- In office January 6, 1987 – November 21, 1994
- Preceded by: James Barber
- Succeeded by: Michael Horsey

Personal details
- Born: Vincent J. Hughes; October 26, 1956 (age 70) Philadelphia, Pennsylvania, U.S.
- Party: Democratic
- Spouse: Sheryl Lee Ralph (m. 2005)
- Children: 2
- Education: Temple University
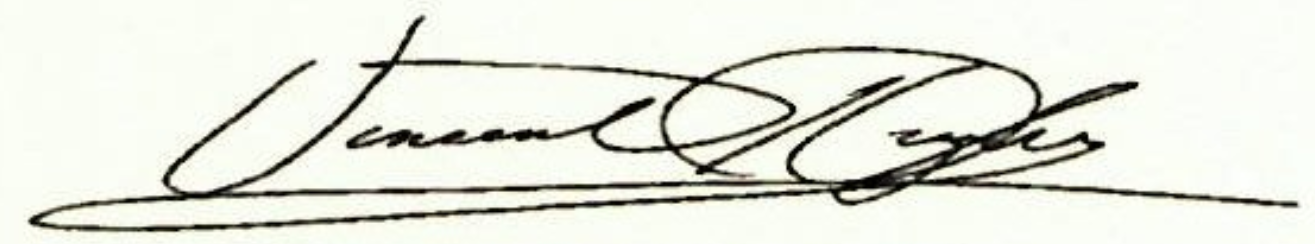
- Signature

Vincent J. Hughes (born October 26, 1956) is an American politician who is serving as a Democratic member of the Pennsylvania State Senate, representing the 7th District since 1994. Hughes previously served as a member of the Pennsylvania House of Representatives from the 190th District from 1987 to 1994.

== Early life and education ==
Hughes was born in Philadelphia, Pennsylvania, to James and Ann (née Adams) Hughes. After attending Temple University, he worked as library administrator at the University of Pennsylvania and was an official of District Council 47 of the American Federation of State, County and Municipal Employees.

== Career ==
In 1984, Hughes unsuccessfully ran for the Pennsylvania House of Representatives in the 190th District, losing to longtime incumbent James Barber in the Democratic primary. He challenged Barber again in 1986, and finally won the nomination. In the general election, he defeated his Republican opponent, Sandra R. Kellar, by a margin of 89%-11%. As a member of the State House, he served as chairman the Pennsylvania Legislative Black Caucus from 1991 to 1994.

After Chaka Fattah resigned to run for the U.S. House of Representatives, Hughes was elected to succeed him as State Senator from the 7th District in a special election on November 21, 1994. As a member of the State Senate, he has served as Deputy Minority Whip (2005-2006), Minority Caucus Secretary (2007-2008), Minority Caucus Chair (2009-2010). He was elected Minority Chair of the Appropriations Committee in 2011.

In February 2012, Hughes voted in favor of House Bill 1950. This bill significantly reduces the rights of municipalities to defend themselves against health risks posed by gas drilling.

Hughes is currently the Democratic chair of the Senate Appropriations Committee.

For the 2025-2026 Session Hughes serves on the following committees in the State Senate:

- Appropriations (Minority Chair)
- Intergovernmental Operations
- Rules & Executive Nominations

== Personal life ==
Hughes is a trustee of the Mt. Carmel Baptist Church. Hughes met actress, singer, and activist Sheryl Lee Ralph in 2003. The couple married in 2005. Hughes had two children from a previous marriage, as did Ralph.
