= Lucien Blackwell =

American politician

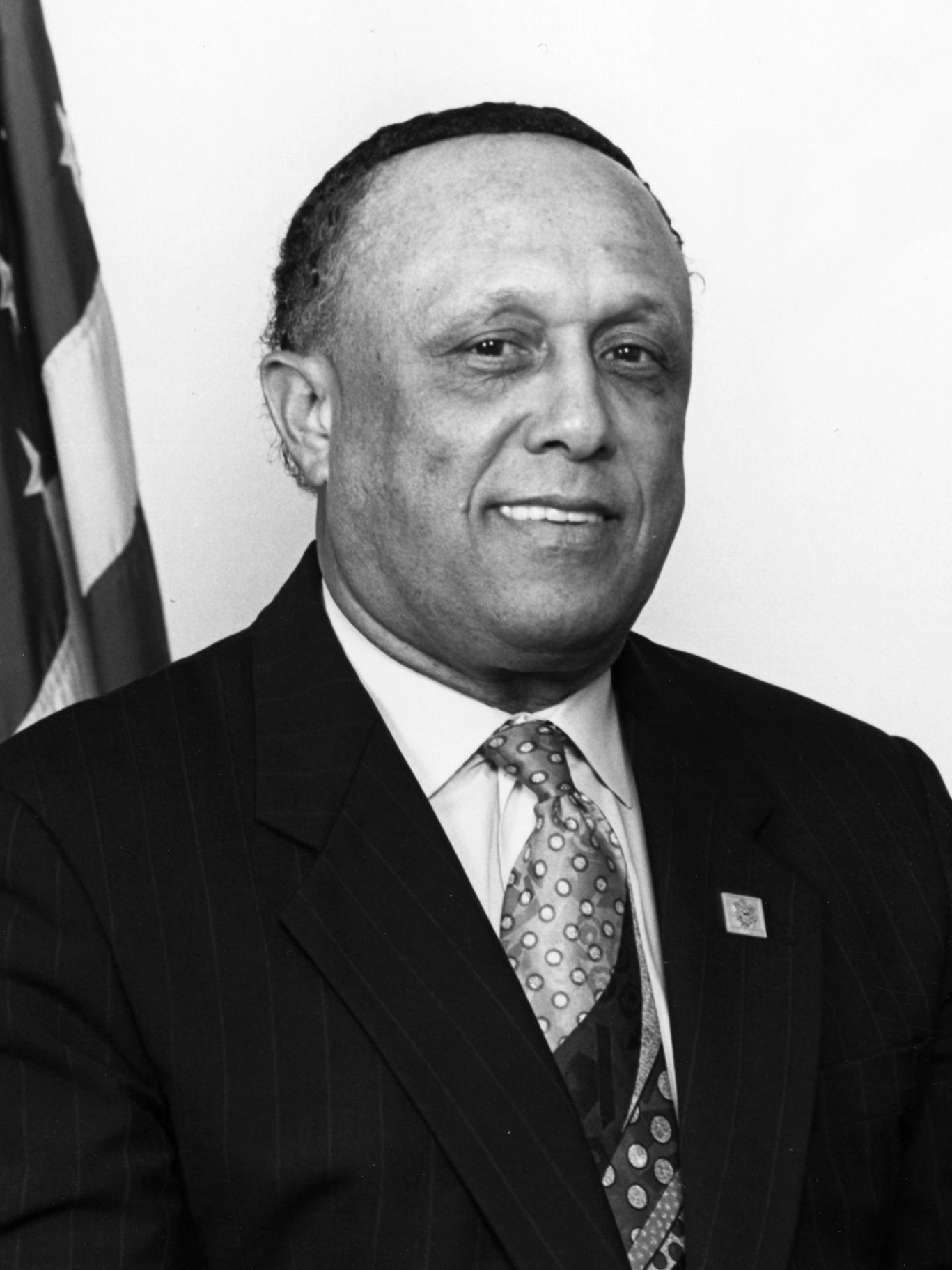
- Official portrait, 1991

Member of the U.S. House of Representatives from Pennsylvania's 2nd district
- In office November 5, 1991 – January 3, 1995 (Note: Blackwell's official service begins on the date of the special election, while he was not sworn in until November 13, 1991.)
- Preceded by: William Gray
- Succeeded by: Chaka Fattah

Member of the Pennsylvania House of Representatives from the 188th district
- In office January 2, 1973 – December 31, 1975
- Preceded by: James O'Donnell
- Succeeded by: Alija Dumas

Member of the Philadelphia City Council from the 3rd district
- In office January 7, 1976 – February 7, 1991
- Preceded by: Charles Durham
- Succeeded by: Jannie Blackwell

Personal details
- Born: Lucien Edward Blackwell; August 1, 1931 Whitsett, Pennsylvania, U.S.
- Died: January 24, 2003 (aged 71) Philadelphia, Pennsylvania, U.S.
- Party: Democratic
- Spouse: Jannie Blackwell
- Children: Thomas

Lucien Edward Blackwell (August 1, 1931 – January 24, 2003) was an American boxer, longshoreman, and politician. He served as a Democratic member of the Pennsylvania House of Representatives from 1973 to 1975, Philadelphia City Council from 1976 to 1991, and the United States House of Representatives from 1991 to 1995.

== Early life ==
Blackwell was born in Whitsett, Fayette County, Pennsylvania on August 1, 1931. After attending West Philadelphia High School, he took a job as a dockworker and briefly pursued a career as a boxer. In 1953, he was drafted into the United States Army and served in the Korean War. Blackwell was a boxing champion during his years in the Army. After his service ended, he returned to the docks as a longshoreman. In 1973, he became the president of the International Longshoremen's Association, Local 1332.

== Pennsylvania politics ==
Blackwell's professional political career began with election to the Pennsylvania House of Representatives where he served from 1973 to 1975.

=== Philadelphia City Council ===
"Lucien the Solution" was best known as a vibrant member of the Philadelphia City Council from 1975 to 1991. While serving on the Council, Blackwell served several terms as Chairman of the Finance Committee, where he led the charge to divest pension funds from businesses doing business in South Africa. Blackwell also sponsored the Philadelphia's first law to create opportunities for minorities and women to compete to obtain city contracts. Blackwell was also heavily involved in legislation to create the Pennsylvania Convention Center and in passing the law that broke Philadelphia's long-standing building height limit, allowing for the construction of Philadelphia's One Liberty Place. Blackwell was perhaps best known for his fiery oratory on the Council floor and for serving as a mentor to the former Philadelphia Mayor (and Council President) John Street. During his City Council tenure, Blackwell was an unsuccessful candidate for mayor of Philadelphia in both 1979 and 1991.

== United States House of Representatives ==
Blackwell was elected as a Democrat to the One Hundred Second Congress by special election to fill the vacancy caused by the resignation of Representative Bill Gray, and reelected to the succeeding Congress. In Congress, Blackwell was a member of the United States House Committee on the Budget and a reliable advocate for President Bill Clinton's economic policies.

Blackwell was ultimately an unsuccessful candidate for renomination to the One Hundred Fourth Congress in 1994, losing the primary to Chaka Fattah, and served as lobbyist following his tenure in Congress.

== Death and legacy ==
On January 24, 2003, Blackwell died at the age of 71. A mural reading "Thank you, Mr. Blackwell", can be seen at 42nd Street and Haverford Avenue in West Philadelphia. The Lucien E. Blackwell West Philadelphia Regional Library at the corner of Sansom and 52nd Street is named in his honor. Blackwell's widow, Jannie Blackwell, was formerly a member of the Philadelphia City Council, also representing the Third District, and his son, Thomas, was a former member of the Pennsylvania House of Representatives.

== See also ==
- List of African-American United States representatives

U.S. House of Representatives
Preceded by William Gray	Member of the U.S. House of Representatives from Pennsylvania's 2nd congressional district 1991–1995	Succeeded by Chaka Fattah
Pennsylvania House of Representatives
Preceded by James O'Donnell	Member of the Pennsylvania House of Representatives for the 188th District; 1973–1976	Succeeded by Alija Dumas
Philadelphia City Council
Preceded by Charles L. Durham	Member of the Philadelphia City Council for the 3rd District; 1974–1991	Succeeded by Jannie Blackwell
