= James D. Williams (Pennsylvania politician) =

American politician

Member of the Pennsylvania House of Representatives from the 188th district
- In office January 6, 1981 – March 13, 1985
- Preceded by: Alija Dumas
- Succeeded by: James Roebuck

Personal details
- Born: February 18, 1943 Baltimore, Maryland
- Died: March 13, 1985 (aged 42) Philadelphia, Pennsylvania
- Party: Democratic

James D. Williams (February 18, 1943 – March 13, 1985) was a Democratic member of the Pennsylvania House of Representatives.
