= John C. Grady =

American lawyer and politician

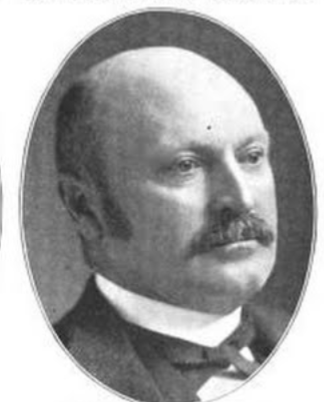

Member of the Pennsylvania Senate, 7th district
- In office 1877–1903
- Preceded by: Hiram Horter
- Succeeded by: James P. McNichol

Pennsylvania Senate, President Pro Tempore
- In office 1887–1890

Personal details
- Born: John Cadwalader Grady; October 8, 1847 Eastport, Maine, U.S.
- Died: March 5, 1916 (aged 68) Philadelphia, Pennsylvania, U.S.
- Resting place: Mount Moriah Cemetery, Philadelphia, Pennsylvania, U.S.
- Party: Republican
- Education: University of Pennsylvania Law School

John Cadwalader Grady (October 8, 1847 – March 5, 1916) was an American lawyer and politician from Pennsylvania who served as a Republican member of the Pennsylvania Senate for the 7th district from 1877 to 1903 including as President Pro Tempore from 1887 to 1890.

== Early life and education ==
Grady was born in Eastport, Maine to Irish immigrant John O'Grady and Eliza Daggett. The family moved to Philadelphia, Pennsylvania when he was young and he attended the Philadelphia public schools. He began his career as a bookkeeper for Gould & Company. Grady graduated from the University of Pennsylvania Law School and was admitted to the Pennsylvania bar in 1871. He practiced law in Philadelphia.

== Career ==
From 1877 to 1905, Grady served in the Pennsylvania State Senate and was president pro tempore of the state senate in 1887 and 1889. From 1907 to 1909, Grady served as Philadelphia Department of Docks, Wharves, and Ferries. He never married and died in a Philadelphia hospital after suffering a stroke. He was interred at the Mount Moriah Cemetery in Philadelphia.
