= James P. O'Donnell (politician) =

American politician

Member of the Pennsylvania House of Representatives from the 188th district
- In office January 7, 1969 – November 30, 1972
- Preceded by: District Created
- Succeeded by: Lucien Blackwell

Member of the Pennsylvania House of Representatives from the Philadelphia County district
- In office 1959–1968

Personal details
- Born: December 20, 1920 Philadelphia, Pennsylvania
- Died: March 22, 1997 (aged 76) Brigantine, New Jersey
- Party: Democratic

James P. O'Donnell (December 20, 1920 – March 22, 1997) was a Democratic member of the Pennsylvania House of Representatives.
