= Freeman Hankins =

American politician

Member of the Pennsylvania Senate from the 7th district
- In office January 2, 1967 – December 31, 1988
- Preceded by: Charles R. Weiner
- Succeeded by: Chaka Fattah

Member of the Pennsylvania House of Representatives from the Philadelphia County district
- In office January 1, 1961 – November 30, 1968

Personal details
- Born: September 30, 1917 Brunswick, Georgia, U.S.
- Died: December 31, 1988 (aged 71) Philadelphia, Pennsylvania, U.S.
- Education: Dolan's College of Embalming

Military service
- Branch/service: United States Army

Freeman Hankins (September 30, 1917 – December 31, 1988) was an American politician and funeral director who served as a member of the Pennsylvania State Senate for the 7th district from 1969 to 1988. He also served in the Pennsylvania House of Representatives for Philadelphia county from 1961 to 1968. He was a Democrat.

== Early life and education ==
Hankins was born in Brunswick, Georgia to Oliver and Anna Pyles Hankins. He was African-American. He attended the Friendship School in Pittsburgh, Pennsylvania, the Selden Institute, and Temple University. He graduated from Dolan's College of Embalming in 1945.

== Career ==
Hankins served in the Medical Corps from 1944 to 1947 and began a career as a funeral director.

He served on the Democratic Committee of Philadelphia's 6th ward and as vice-chairman of Philadelphia's Democratic Committee. He served as a trustee of Lincoln University and the Stephen Smith Geriatric Center.

He died at the University of Pennsylvania Hospital in 1988 and is interred at the Fernwood Cemetery in Yeadon, Pennsylvania.
