= Gaining Early Awareness and Readiness for Undergraduate Programs =

Gaining Early Awareness and Readiness for Undergraduate Programs ("GEAR UP") is a federal grant program administered by the United States Department of Education. It was established in Chapter 2 of the 1998 amendments to the Higher Education Act of 1965 which awarded financial assistance to students and colleges from the federal government. GEAR UP was authored by Congressman Chaka Fattah and signed into law by President Bill Clinton in October, 1998.

== Purpose ==
The goal of GEAR UP is to increase the number of these students who matriculate into in-state public universities. The grant operates on a six-year grant program. The grants are divided into two groups: state grants and partnership grants. State grants must include a plan to contact students prior to the prospective students arriving as university students. The plan must show an intention to increase the rate of college-going for low-income students in addition to providing a scholarship to students. In addition, it must prepare students to succeed at the college level. Partnership grants have the same goals, however, they are only required to fulfill the early intervention component. Partnership grants may support scholarship efforts for low-income students as well. Both grant types work to assist cohorts of students, beginning in the seventh grade. This cohort is followed by the grant program throughout high school, with some students receiving scholarships to help them attend in-state public universities. For a State agency to be eligible to apply for a GEAR UP grant, the agency must be designated by the governor of that State. Each state may only apply for up to one GEAR UP grant at a time. For partnership grants, applying partnerships must consist of "one or more local educational agencies and one or more degree-granting institutions of higher education and not less than two other community organizations or other entities such as businesses, professional organizations, or state agencies" to be eligible. Unlike state grants, partnerships may apply for, and receive, multiple partnership grants concurrently. All applicants are able to access Grants.gov to retrieve the application (that may be downloaded and completed offline) and then upload the complete application back to the website. Applicants that are awarded grants ("grantees") are required to submit annual performance reports to ensure that their implementation of these funds falls in line with the mission of the US Department of Education. Nationally, GEAR UP programs have at least helped to spur some interest about college in low-income communities. in 2006, 66 percent of student survey respondents had spoken with someone about college entrance requirements. Of this same population, 55% of students were able to speak with someone about the availability of financial aid. Funding for the program has grown in recent years, increasing from $301,639,000 in fiscal year 2015, to $322,754,000 in fiscal year 2016, to 339,752,985 in fiscal year 2017. On March 21, 2018, Congress agreed to increase the national funding for GEAR UP programs by 2.9 percent.

== Early Intervention and College Awareness Program ==
The GEAR UP chapter focuses heavily on the Early Intervention and College Awareness Program. This program provides a guarantee of financial aid to low-income students who have obtained a secondary diploma or its equivalent. The program was also designed to aid students in elementary and high school to be aware of the benefits of higher education, and to reach the educational level necessary to attend an institute of higher education. Institutions eligible for grant money include states, partnerships between middle schools, high schools, colleges and universities, and community organizations and businesses. The grant also stipulates that at least 50% of the participants must be eligible for free or reduced-price lunch, or are at or below 150% of the Federal poverty level. Each entity devises its own plan, submits the plan to the Secretary of Education, and evaluates the plan on a biennial basis. The submitted plan must describe the activities to be implemented and provide the necessary assurances that the grant money will be matched by the entity; Other existing programs will not be undermined by the new plan or any of the conclusive evaluation results. Eligible entities must implement the plan so it impacts students for the first time no later than their seventh grade year, therefore many programs are initiated in middle schools and extended to the associated high school.

Entities receiving grant money are given a fair amount of autonomy. Each plan is devised and implemented independent of other entities. However, each plan must include comprehensive mentoring, counseling, outreach, and supportive services, including financial aid counseling, providing information and activities regarding college admissions, achievement tests, and application procedures, and improving parental involvement.

For students who successfully complete the middle school and high school programs, there are scholarships available. In order to be eligible for this students must be less than 22 years of age and have participated in the early intervention component of the program.

The program also allows a small percentage, only 0.75% to be used in assessing and evaluating the effectiveness of an entity's plan. When the program was passed in 1998, $200 million was appropriated for the following fiscal year, and for five years after. Since the passing of the bill, this program has been met with general approval.

== Chicago GEAR UP Alliance ==
The Chicago GEAR UP Alliance has been in existence since 1999, and since then has been operating out of the Center for College Access and Success. The fiscal institution for the Chicago GEAR UP Alliance is Northeastern Illinois University, and they partner with many local higher education institutions such as Roosevelt University, DePaul University, Loyola University, Truman College, while also partnering with community based organizations such as Heartland Alliance, Youth Guidance, and New Concepts Mentor Connection. The Chicago GEAR UP Alliance works with the Chicago Public Schools to combine resources, knowledge, and experience to implement their plan within the Chicago Public School System. The last graduating class for the Chicago GEAR UP Alliance was the class of 2011, which featured 65% of students enroll in college, 95% of students complete the FAFSA, received over $30 million in scholarship awards, and out of the 24 Gates Foundation Scholarship award winners, 12 of them were GEAR UP students. The class of 2011 also saw more than 80% of the students graduate high school, and of the 65% of students who enrolled in college, 64% of those students continued their college careers beyond their first year.

One of the staples of the Chicago GEAR UP Alliance is the "Freshman Connection" program. The Freshman Connection program has been directly associate with a 5.4% increase in student on-track status and a 4% increase in student passing algebra rate. When comparing non-GEAR UP students with GEAR UP students at the end of their freshman year in high school, the students who participated in Freshman Connection were 6% more likely to graduate on time, and 6% more likely to stay in college beyond their first year.

On September 22, 2014, Arne Duncan, the U.S. Secretary of Education, announced that there will be $82 million given to 41 different grants across the country. Of these 41 grants, Northeastern Illinois University will receive the largest, totaling $40 million over a span of 7 years. This money will reach 14 high schools and 36 elementary and middle schools in the Chicago Public School system.

Currently, the Chicago GEAR UP Alliance includes, for 2020 and 2021: Bogan, Farragut, Foreman, Goode, Harlan, Hubbard, Julian, Kelly, Morgan Park, Robeson, Roosevelt, Senn, Solorio, and Engelwood Technical Prep Academy.

== Other programs ==
Other programs amended include:

- Federal Supplemental Educational Opportunity Grants
- Leveraging Educational Assistance Partnership Program - including creation of the Special Leveraging Educational Assistance Partnership Program
- Special programs for students whose families are involved in migrant and seasonal farmwork
- The Robert C. Byrd Honors Scholarship Program - $45 million appropriated for fiscal year 1999
- Child Care Access Means Parents in School - supporting campus-based child care at secondary schools
- Learning Anytime Anywhere Partnerships - a project for technology-based education outside of a traditional setting
- Federal Family Education Loan Program
- Federal Student Loan Reserve Fund
