= J. D. Williams (admiral) =

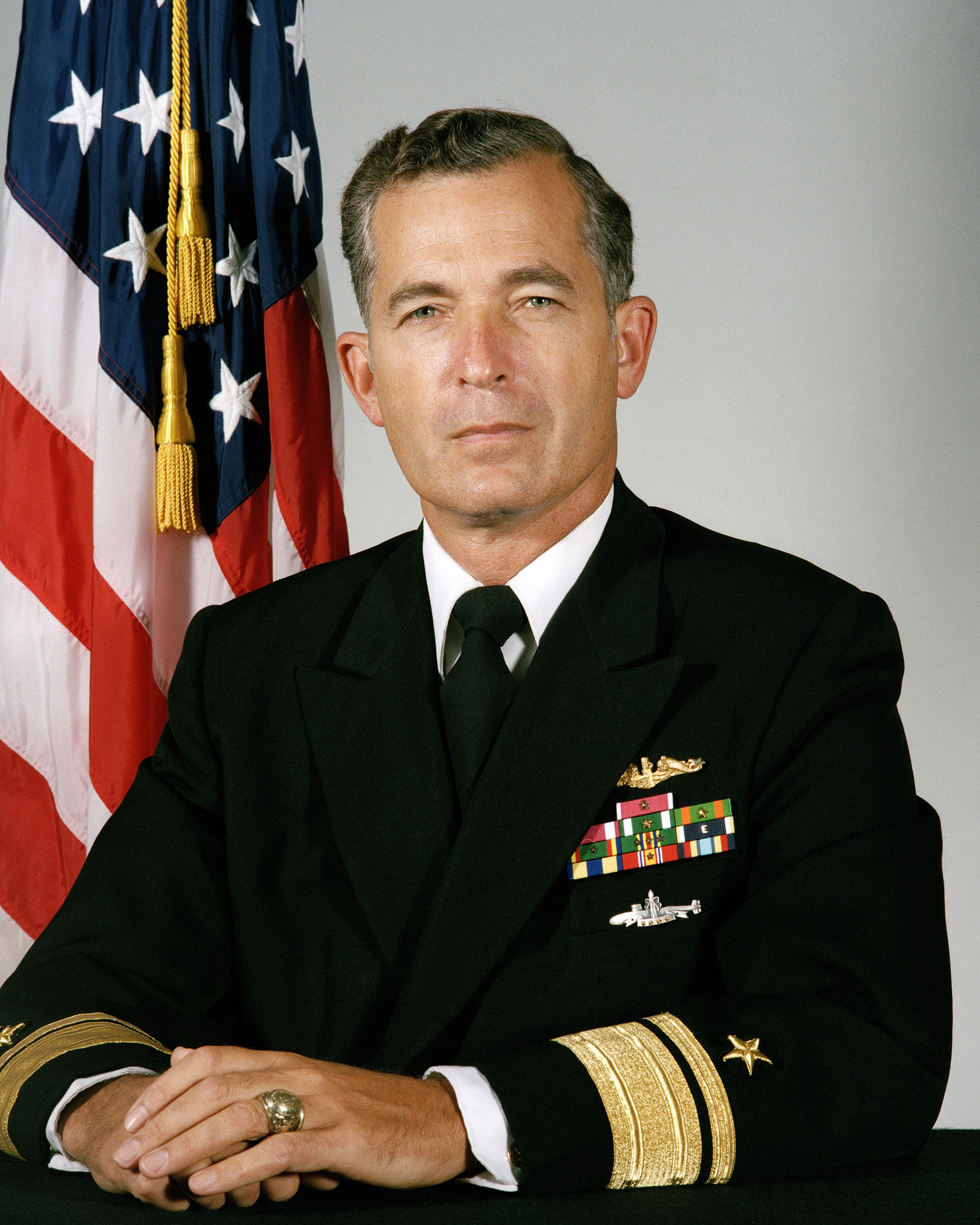
- Williams as a Rear Admiral in 1987
- Born: October 23, 1935 (age 90); Lumberton, North Carolina, U.S.
- Military career
- Allegiance: United States
- Branch: United States Navy
- Rank: Vice admiral
- Commands: United States Sixth Fleet

James Dale Williams (born October 23, 1935) was a vice admiral in the United States Navy. He is a former commander of the United States Sixth Fleet (from August 1988 – November 1990), Commander of NATO Striking Force in Southern Europe, Commander of the Navy Recruiting Command, and Deputy Chief of Naval Operations for Naval Warfare. He is a 1958 graduate of the United States Naval Academy.
