= Bob Brooks (Pennsylvania politician) =

American Democratic politician

- Brooks in 2026

Member-elect of the U.S. House of Representatives from Pennsylvania's 7th district
- Assuming office January 3, 2027
- Succeeding: Ryan Mackenzie

Personal details
- Born: 1972 or 1973 (age 53–54) North Adams, Massachusetts, U.S.
- Party: Democratic
- Children: 4

Bob Brooks (born 1972 or 1973) is an American politician, labor leader and retired firefighter. A member of the Democratic Party, he is the representative-elect for Pennsylvania's 7th congressional district in 2026.

== Early life and firefighting ==
Brooks was born in North Adams, Massachusetts, and raised by his mother. He worked as a paperboy at age 10 and later at a factory while attending high school. In high school, he played football. Shortly prior to his final football game, his house burned down. Afterwards, he and his mother moved to Bath, Pennsylvania, in 1992. Brooks attended college for a time before dropping out. He worked various jobs in the subsequent years, including as a bartender, truck driver, cook, pizza deliveryman and dishwasher.

In 2005, Brooks began working as a firefighter in Bethlehem, Pennsylvania, serving 20 years until his retirement in March 2025. He was also active as a labor leader, serving many positions with the local chapter of the International Association of Fire Fighters, "including roster duty chairman, trustee, vice president, secretary-treasurer, and president." In 2021, he became the president of the Pennsylvania Professional Fire Fighters Association, a union with a membership of 8,000. Brooks is also the owner of a snow removal and lawn care business.

Brooks is married and has four children. He has served as a high school baseball coach at Nazareth Area High School.

== Political career ==
In August 2025, Brooks declared his candidacy for the United States House of Representatives for Pennsylvania's 7th congressional district as a member of the Democratic Party. Among those to endorse him were Governor Josh Shapiro and Vermont Senator Bernie Sanders. Endorsed by the Blue Dog PAC, he won the Democratic primary on May 19, 2026, with 41% of the vote, winning against Ryan Crosswell, Lamont McClure and Carol Obando-Derstine. In the general election, he defeated incumbent Republican Ryan Mackenzie in the key U.S. House race.

U.S. House of Representatives
Preceded by Ryan Mackenzie	Member of the U.S. House of Representatives from Pennsylvania's 7th congressional district Taking office 2027	Elect
