= 2026 United States House of Representatives elections in Pennsylvania =

- November 3, 2026

All 17 Pennsylvania seats to the United States House of Representatives
	Majority party	Minority party
Party	Democratic	Republican
Last election	7	10
Seats won	11	6
Seat change	▲4	▼4
Popular vote	2,827,708	2,147,667
Percentage	56.63%	43.01%
Swing	▲7.68%	▼8.04%

Democratic hold Democratic gain
Republican hold
Democratic
50–60%
60–70%
70–80%
80–90%
90–100%
Republican
50–60%
60–70%
70–80%
80–90%

The 2026 United States House of Representatives elections in Pennsylvania were held on November 3, 2026, to elect the 17 U.S. representatives from the State of Pennsylvania, one from each of the state's congressional districts. The elections coincided with other elections to the House of Representatives, elections to the United States Senate, and various state and local elections. Primary elections took place on May 19, 2026.

== Statewide polling ==
=== Statewide congressional polls ===
Poll source	Date(s) administered	Sample size (Note: Key: A – all adults RV – registered voters LV – likely voters V – unclear)	Margin of error	Democratic	Republican	Other	Undecided
Franklin & Marshall College	October 7–18, 2026	808 (RV)	± 4.1%	48%	41%	2% (Note: "Some other candidate" with 2%)	9%
Franklin & Marshall College	October 7–18, 2026	808 (RV)	± 4.1%	48% (Note: With voters who lean towards a given candidate)	43%	3% (Note: "Other" with 3%)	6%
Franklin & Marshall College	August 17–23, 2026	501 (RV)	± 5.5%	48%	46%	2%	6%
Franklin & Marshall College	June 8–14, 2026	546 (RV)	± 5.1%	47%	35%	1% (Note: "Some other candidate" with 1%)	17%
Franklin & Marshall College	February 18 – March 1, 2026	834 (RV)	± 4.1%	44%	37%	1%	19%
Franklin & Marshall College	September 24 – October 5, 2025	929 (RV)	± 4.0%	45%	40%	–	15%

== District 1 ==
2026 Pennsylvania's 1st congressional district election

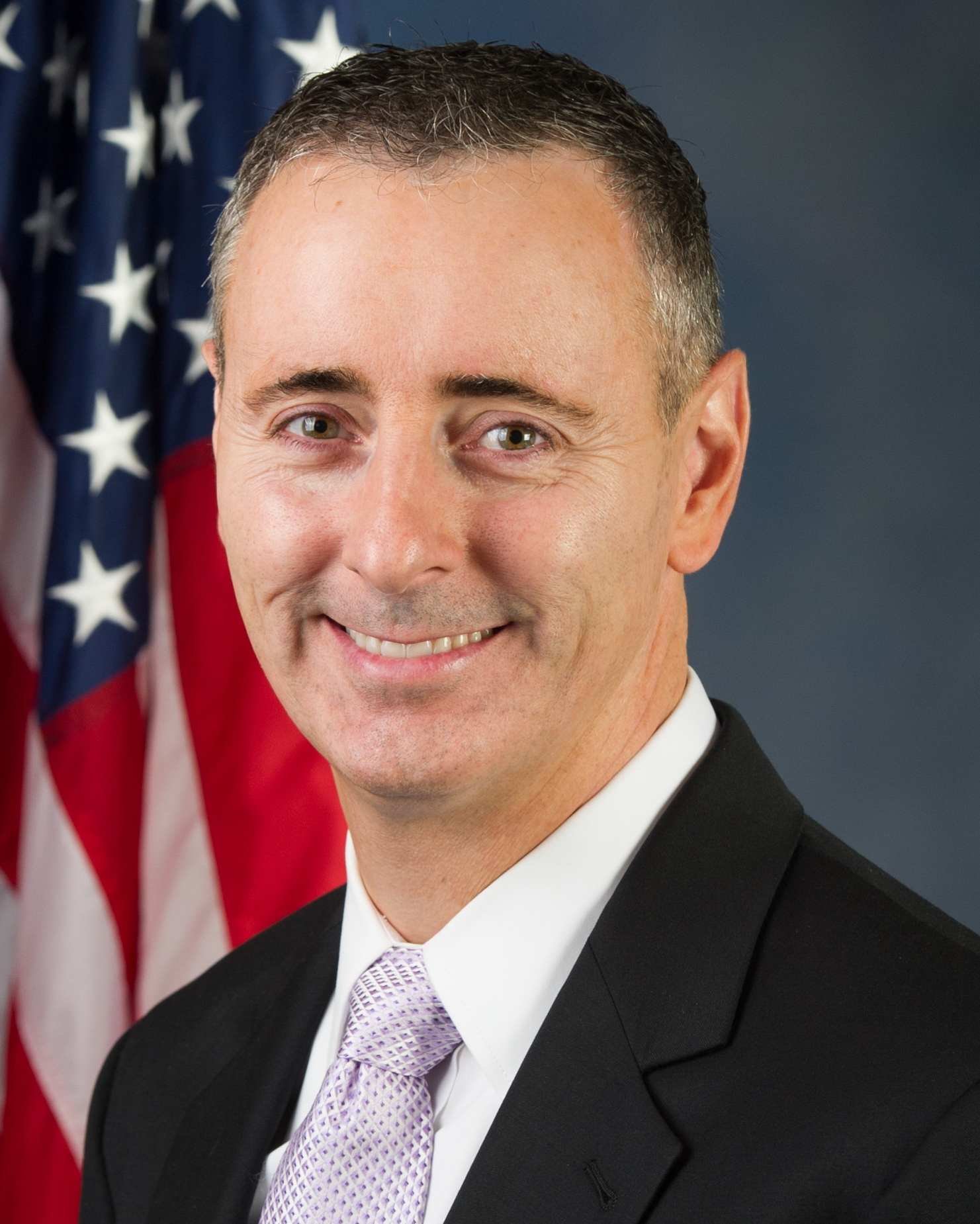
Nominee	Bob Harvie	Brian Fitzpatrick
Party	Democratic	Republican
Popular vote	188,087	168,531
Percentage	52.7%	47.3%
- County results Harvie: 50–60%
U.S. Representative before election
Brian Fitzpatrick
Republican
Elected U.S. Representative
Bob Harvie
Democratic

The 1st district is based in the northern suburbs of Philadelphia, including all of Bucks County and parts of Montgomery County. The incumbent is Republican Brian Fitzpatrick, who was re-elected with 56.4% of the vote in 2024. Fitzpatrick, a moderate, was expected to face a primary challenge from a more right-wing candidate after voting against the One Big Beautiful Bill Act, but ultimately drew no challengers.

=== Republican primary ===
==== Nominee ====
- Brian Fitzpatrick, incumbent U.S. representative

==== Declined ====
- Mark Houck, nonprofit ministry founder and candidate for this district in 2024

==== Endorsements ====
Brian Fitzpatrick

U.S. representatives

- Gabby Giffords, former AZ-08 (2007–2012) (Democratic)
- Mike Johnson, speaker of the House (2023–present) from LA-04 (2017–present)

Labor unions

- American Federation of Government Employees
- National Education Association

Organizations

- Giffords
- Log Cabin Republicans
- Republican Jewish Coalition

==== Fundraising ====
Campaign finance reports as of December 31, 2025
Candidate	Raised	Spent	Cash on hand
Brian Fitzpatrick (R)	$4,286,172	$1,348,181	$7,360,520
Source: Federal Election Commission

==== Results ====
Republican primary results
Party	Candidate	Votes	%
Republican	Brian Fitzpatrick (incumbent)	44,365	100.0
Total votes		44,365	100.0

=== Democratic primary ===
==== Nominee ====
- Bob Harvie, chair of the Bucks County Commission (2020–present)

==== Eliminated in primary ====
- Lucia Simonelli, mathematician

==== Endorsements ====
Bob Harvie

Executive branch officials

- Patrick Murphy, former Under Secretary of the Army (2016–2017)

U.S. representatives

- Matt Cartwright, former PA-08 (2019-2025)
- Madeleine Dean, PA-04 (2019–present)
- Suzan DelBene, WA-01 (2012–present)
- Chris Deluzio, PA-17 (2023–present)
- Peter Kostmayer, former PA-08 (1977–1981, 1983–1993)
- Conor Lamb, former PA-18 (2018–2023)
- Greg Stanton, AZ-04 (2019–present)

Statewide officials

- Austin Davis, lieutenant governor of Pennsylvania (2023–present)
- Josh Shapiro, governor of Pennsylvania (2023–present)

State legislators

- Tim Brennan, HD-29 (2023–present)
- Melissa Cerrato, HD-151 (2023–present)
- Tina Davis, HD-141 (2011–present)
- Steve Santarsiero, SD-10 (2019–present)
- Steve Malagari, HD-53 (2019–present)
- Brian Munroe, HD-144 (2023–present)
- Jim Prokopiak, HD-140 (2024–present)

Local officials

- Danny Ceisler, sheriff of Bucks County (2026–present)
- Diane Ellis-Marseglia, vice-chair of the Bucks County Board of Commissioners (2008–present)
- Joe Khan, district attorney of Bucks County (2026–present)
- Sean P. Kilkenny, sheriff of Montgomery County (2015–present)

Labor unions

- Transport Workers Union Local 234

Organizations

- DCCC Red to Blue
Lucia Simonelli

State legislators

- Helen Tai, former HD-178 (2018)

Organizations

- Indivisible Greater Jenkintown, Lower Merion, and Montgomery County & Friends
- Track AIPAC

==== Debates and forums ====
2026 PA-01 Democratic primary debates and forums
No.	Date	Host	Moderator	Link	Participants					
P Participant A Absent N Non-invitee I Invitee W Withdrawn										
P Participant A Absent N Non-invitee I Invitee W Withdrawn					Harvie	Hunt	Simonelli	Strickler	Taft	Zeltakalns
1	January 13, 2026	Upper Bucks United	Kim Barbaro		A	P	P	P	A	A
2	February 11, 2026		Sherry Luce	YouTube	A	P	P	P	P	P
3	April 27, 2026	League of Women Voters of Bucks County			P	W	P	W	W	W

==== Fundraising ====
Italics indicates a nonqualifying candidate.

Campaign finance reports as of December 31, 2025
Candidate	Raised	Spent	Cash on hand
Bob Harvie (D)	$928,059	$519,928	$408,130
Tracy Hunt (D)	$39,847	$39,083	$763
Lucia Simonelli (D)	$28,347	$832	$27,514
Robert Strickler (D)	$24,795	$24,185	$609
Source: Federal Election Commission

==== Results ====
Results by county: Harvie: 60–70%

Democratic primary results
Party	Candidate	Votes	%
Democratic	Bob Harvie	52,094	65.1
Democratic	Lucia Simonelli	27,884	34.9
Total votes		79,978	100.0

=== General election ===
==== Predictions ====
Source	Ranking	As of
Decision Desk HQ	Tossup	October 30, 2026
The Cook Political Report	Tossup	October 30, 2026
Inside Elections	Tossup	October 29, 2026
Sabato's Crystal Ball	Lean D (flip)	November 2, 2026
Silver Bulletin	Tossup	August 20, 2026

==== Post-primary endorsements ====
Brian Fitzpatrick (R)

U.S. senators

- Joe Manchin, former West Virginia (2010–2025) (Independent; elected as a Democrat)

Governors

- Christine Todd Whitman, former Governor of New Jersey (1994–2001) (Forward; elected as a Republican)

Individuals

- Andrew Yang, entrepreneur, founder of Venture for America, Democratic candidate for president in 2020 and for mayor of New York City in 2021 (Forward; previously a Democrat)

Labor unions

- Boilermakers Local 13
- International Brotherhood of Electrical Workers Local 98
- National Air Traffic Controllers Association
- Pennsylvania AFL-CIO
- Pennsylvania State Education Association
- SEIU Pennsylvania State Council
- Transport Workers Union of America

Political parties

- Forward Party

Organizations

- American Conservation Coalition Action
- League of Conservation Voters
- U.S. Chamber of Commerce
Bob Harvie (D)

Labor unions

- American Federation of Teachers Pennsylvania

Organizations

- J Street
- Jewish Democratic Council of America

Newspapers

- The Philadelphia Inquirer

==== Fundraising ====
Campaign finance reports as of October 14, 2026
Candidate	Raised	Spent	Cash on hand
Brian Fitzpatrick (R)	$8,021,376	$11,734,809	$709,097
Bob Harvie (D)	$3,167,942	$2,758,530	$409,413
Source: Federal Election Commission

==== Polling ====
Poll source	Date(s) administered	Sample size	Margin of error	Brian Fitzpatrick (R)	Bob Harvie (D)	Other	Undecided
RedBox Research (D) (Note: Poll sponsored by A Fight Worth Having)	October 20-23, 2026	733 (LV)	± 4.6%	46%	46%	4% (Note: "Someone else" with 2%; " Prefer not to answer with 1%%)	4%
New York Times/The Philadelphia Inquirer/Siena University	October 16–22, 2026	400 (LV)	± 5.7%	46%	48%	0% (Note: "Another candidate" with 0%)	6%
Global Strategy Group (D) (Note: Poll sponsored by Harvie's campaign)	October 1–8, 2026	1,032 (LV)	± 3.1%	46%	46%	–	8%
Public Opinion Strategies (R) (Note: Poll sponsored by Fitzpatrick's campaign)	September 11–14, 2026	400 (RV)	± 4.0%	49%	40%	–	11%
Public Opinion Strategies (R)	September 11–14, 2026	400 (RV)	± 4.0%	51%	42%	–	7%
GQR (D) (Note: Poll sponsored by House Majority PAC, which is focused on electing Democrats to the U.S. House of Representatives)	August 19–23, 2026	400 (LV)	± 4.4%	49%	48%	–	3%
Global Strategy Group (D)	August 5–9, 2026	500 (LV)	± 4.4%	47%	43%	–	10%
	May 19, 2026	Primary elections					
Global Strategy Group (D)	March 19–22, 2026	400 (LV)	± 4.9%	48%	42%	–	10%
Public Policy Polling (D)	October 10–11, 2025	585 (LV)	± 4.1%	41%	41%	–	18%

==== Results ====
2026 Pennsylvania's 1st congressional district election
Party	Candidate	Votes	%	±%
Republican	Brian Fitzpatrick (incumbent)			
Democratic	Bob Harvie			
Total votes				

== District 2 ==
2026 Pennsylvania's 2nd congressional district election
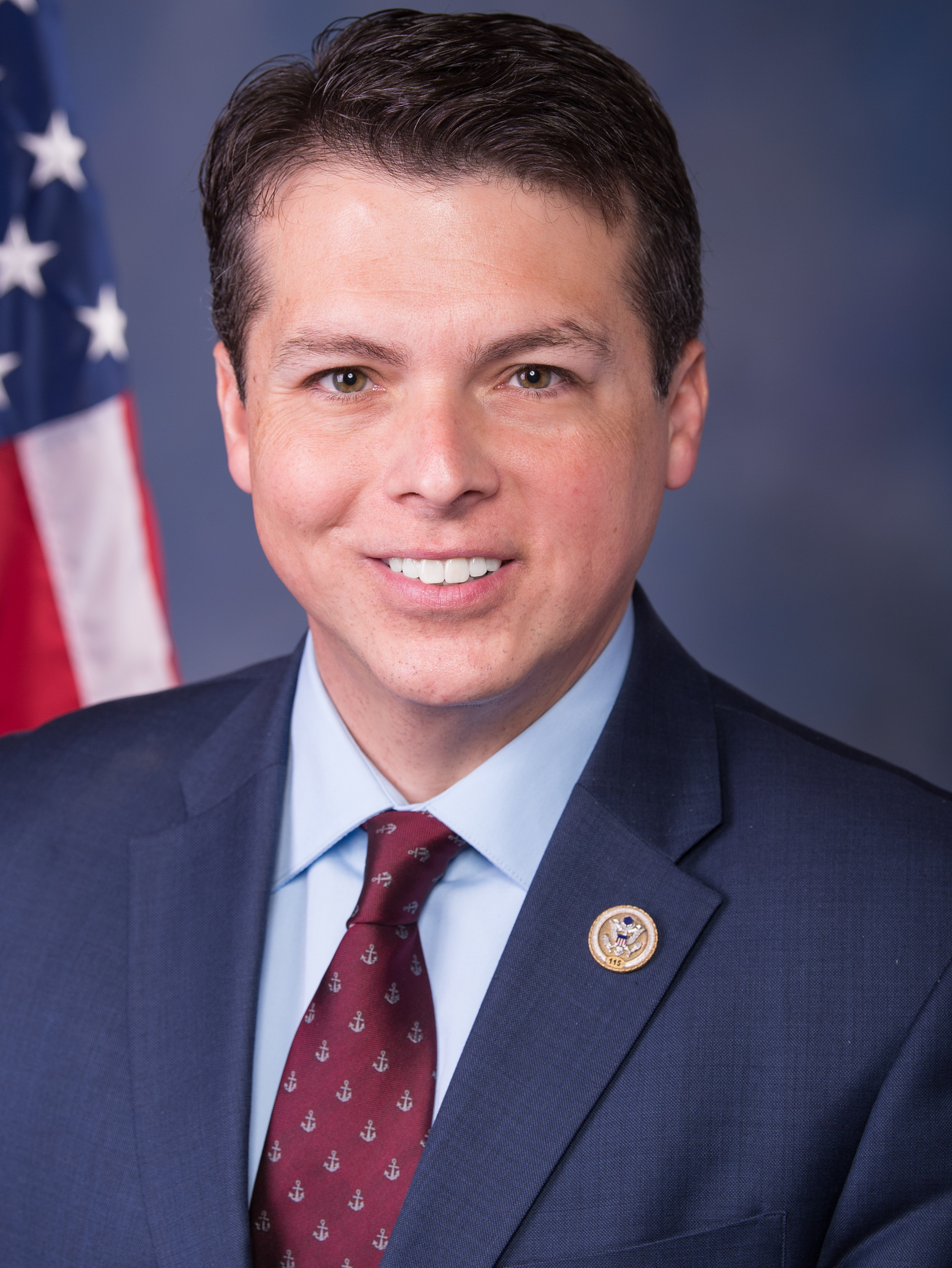

Nominee	Brendan Boyle	Jessica Arriaga
Party	Democratic	Republican
- County results Boyle: 70–80% 80–90%
Incumbent U.S. Representative
Brendan Boyle
Democratic

The 2nd district is based in central and northeastern Philadelphia. The incumbent is Democrat Brendan Boyle, who was re-elected with 71.5% of the vote in 2024.

=== Democratic primary ===
==== Nominee ====
- Brendan Boyle, incumbent U.S. representative

==== Endorsements ====
Brendan Boyle

Organizations

- AIPAC
- Democratic Majority for Israel
- Planned Parenthood Action Fund

==== Fundraising ====
Campaign finance reports as of December 31, 2025
Candidate	Raised	Spent	Cash on hand
Brendan Boyle (D)	$1,522,158	$548,110	$4,812,331
Source: Federal Election Commission

==== Results ====
Democratic primary results
Party	Candidate	Votes	%
Democratic	Brendan Boyle (incumbent)	53,043	100.0
Total votes		53,043	100.0

=== Republican primary ===
==== Nominee ====
- Jessica Arriaga, entrepreneur

==== Results ====
Republican primary results
Party	Candidate	Votes	%
Republican	Jessica Arriaga	6,328	100.0
Total votes		6,328	100.0

=== General election ===
==== Predictions ====
Source	Ranking	As of
Decision Desk HQ	Safe D	July 14, 2026
The Cook Political Report	Solid D	September 11, 2025
Inside Elections	Solid D	September 11, 2025
Sabato's Crystal Ball	Safe D	April 10, 2025
Silver Bulletin	Solid D	August 20, 2026

==== Post-primary endorsements ====
Brendan Boyle (D)

Labor unions

- National Education Association

==== Fundraising ====
Campaign finance reports as of September 30, 2026
Candidate	Raised	Spent	Cash on hand
Brendan Boyle (D)	$2,808,994	$798,373	$5,848,905
Source: Federal Election Commission

==== Results ====
2026 Pennsylvania's 2nd congressional district election
Party	Candidate	Votes	%	±%
Democratic	Brendan Boyle (incumbent)			
Republican	Jessica Arriaga			
Total votes				

== District 3 ==
2026 Pennsylvania's 3rd congressional district election
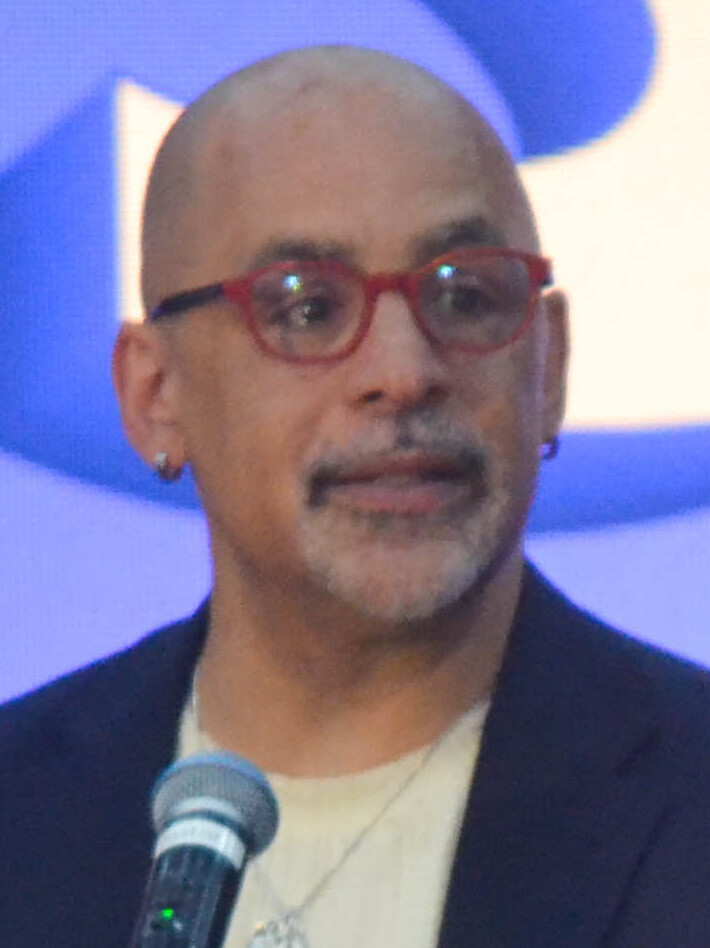

Nominee	Chris Rabb	Dennis Mahoney
Party	Democratic	Independent
Popular vote	255,105	17,424
Percentage	93.6%	6.4%
- County results Rabb: 90–100%
U.S. Representative before election
Dwight Evans
Democratic
Elected U.S. Representative
Chris Rabb
Democratic

The 3rd district is based in west, south, and north Philadelphia (west of Broad Street). The incumbent is Democrat Dwight Evans, who was re-elected unopposed in 2024. Evans announced his retirement in 2025.

=== Democratic primary ===
Chris Rabb, a democratic socialist, won the primary, defeating healthcare official Ala Stanford and state senator Sharif Street, a member of an influential Philadelphia political family. Rabb ran as the most left-wing candidate in the race and received support from members of the Squad, a group of progressive members of Congress. Stanford was endorsed by outgoing representative Evans.

During the campaign, Rabb accused the pro-Israel lobbying group AIPAC of indirectly supporting Stanford by funneling money through 314 Action, an organization that supports candidates with STEM backgrounds. Stanford, 314 Action, and AIPAC denied the allegation. 314 Action spent approximately $2.5 million in support of Stanford. Rabb described the war in Gaza as a genocide and called on his opponents to do the same. American Priorities, a pro-Palestinian super PAC established to counter AIPAC's influence, spent $400,000 in support of Rabb.

==== Nominee ====
- Chris Rabb, state representative from the 200th district (2017–present)

==== Eliminated in primary ====
- Ala Stanford, former mid-Atlantic regional director for the U.S. Department of Health and Human Services
- Sharif Street, state senator from the 3rd district (2017–present), former chair of the Pennsylvania Democratic Party (2022–2025), and candidate for U.S. Senate in 2022
- Shaun Griffith, tax attorney

==== Disqualified ====
- Cole Carter, software engineer
- Karl Morris, Temple University professor

==== Withdrawn ====
- Morgan Cephas, state representative from the 192nd district (2017–present) (endorsed Street)
- Dwight Evans, incumbent U.S. representative (endorsed Stanford)
- NaDerah Griffin, former federal security officer (endorsed Street)
- Pablo McConnie-Saad, former policy adviser for the U.S. Treasury Department
- Dave Oxman, physician (endorsed Stanford)

==== Declined ====
- Rick Krajewski, state representative from the 188th district (2021–present) (endorsed Rabb)

==== Endorsements ====
Chris Rabb

U.S. senators

- Chris Van Hollen, Maryland (2017–present)

U.S. representatives

- Greg Casar, TX-35 (2023–present)
- Maxwell Frost, FL-10 (2023–present)
- Jared Huffman, CA-02 (2013–present)
- Pramila Jayapal, WA-07 (2017–present)
- Ro Khanna, CA-17 (2017–present)
- Summer Lee, PA-12 (2023–present)
- Alexandria Ocasio-Cortez, NY-14 (2019–present)
- Ilhan Omar, MN-05 (2019–present)
- Lateefah Simon, CA-12 (2025–present)
- Jamie Raskin, MD-08 (2017–present)
- Rashida Tlaib, MI-12 (2019-present)

State legislators

- Elizabeth Fiedler, HD-184 (2019–present)
- Rick Krajewski, HD-188 (2021–present)
- Nikil Saval, SD-01 (2021–present)

Local officials

- Kendra Brooks, Philadelphia city councilor from the at-large district (2020–present) (WFP)
- Nicolas O'Rourke, Philadelphia city councilor from the at-large district (2024–present) (WFP)

Individuals

- Benjamin Crump, civil rights attorney
- Hasan Piker, political streamer

Labor unions

- AFT Local 2026

Organizations

- American Priorities
- Center for Freethought Equality
- Center for Biological Diversity
- Christopher Street Project
- Climate Hawks Vote
- Congressional Progressive Caucus PAC
- CAIR Action
- Democratic Socialists of America
- Food & Water Action
- Friends of the Earth
- High School Democrats of America
- Jane Fonda Climate PAC
- Justice Democrats
- Our Revolution
- PAL PAC
- Peace Action
- Progressive Democrats of America
- Reclaim Philadelphia
- Sunrise Movement
- Track AIPAC

Political parties

- Working Families Party

Newspapers

- The Philadelphia Inquirer
Ala Stanford

Executive branch officials

- Marcia Fudge, former secretary of Housing and Urban Development (2021–2024)

U.S. representatives

- Ami Bera, CA-06 (2013–present)
- Herb Conaway, NJ-03 (2025–present)
- Madeleine Dean, PA-04 (2019–present)
- Dwight Evans, PA-03 (2016–present)
- Lois Frankel, FL-22 (2013–2017, 2023-present)
- Chrissy Houlahan, PA-06 (2019–present)
- Allyson Schwartz, former PA-13 (2005–2015)

Statewide officials

- Josh Green, governor of Hawaii (2022–present)

Local officials

- Michael Nutter, former mayor of Philadelphia (2008–2016)

Individuals

- Patti LaBelle, singer
- Paul Offit, pediatrician

Organizations

- 314 Action
- American College of Surgeons
- Elect Democratic Women
- EMILYs List

Newspapers

- The Philadelphia Tribune
Sharif Street

U.S. senators

- Cory Booker, New Jersey (2013–present)

Statewide officials

- Keith Ellison, attorney general of Minnesota (2019–present)
- Ed Rendell, former governor of Pennsylvania (2003–2011)

State legislators

- Andre Carroll, HD-201 (2024–present)
- Morgan Cephas, HD-192 (2017–present)
- Danilo Burgos, HD-197 (2019–present)
- Jordan A. Harris, HD-186 (2013–present)
- Movita Johnson-Harrell, former HD-190 (2019)
- Vincent Hughes, SD-07 (1994–present)
- Shirley Kitchen, former SD-03 (1996–2016)
- Joanna McClinton, speaker of the Pennsylvania House of Representatives (2023–present) from HD-191 (2015–present)
- Darisha Parker, HD-198 (2020–present)
- Anthony H. Williams, SD-08 (1999–present)

Local officials

- Cindy Bass, Philadelphia city councilor from the 8th district (2012–present)
- Jannie Blackwell, former Philadelphia city councilor from the 3rd district (1992–2020)
- Katherine Gilmore Richardson, Philadelphia city councilor from the at-large district (2020–present)
- Jim Harrity, Philadelphia city councilor from the at-large district (2022–present)
- Curtis J. Jones Jr., Philadelphia city councilor from the 4th district (2008–present)
- Kenyatta Johnson, Philadelphia city council president (2024–present) from the 2nd district (2012–present)
- Rue Landau, Philadelphia city councilor from the at-large district (2024–present)
- Cherelle Parker, mayor of Philadelphia (2024–present)
- Anthony Phillips, member of the Philadelphia City Council from the 9th district (2022–present)
- Mark Squilla, Philadelphia city councilor from the 1st district (2012–present)
- Sharon Vaughn, former Philadelphia city councilor from the at-large district (2022–2023)

Individuals

- Chris Bartlett, LGBTQ activist
- Elizabeth Coffey, actress and transgender activist
- David Fair, LGBTQ activist
- Mark Segal, social activist and publisher of the Philadelphia Gay News

Labor unions

- AFGE
- AFSCME District Council 33
- IAFF Local 22
- IUOE Local 542
- IUPAT District Council 21
- Iron Workers Local 405
- Insulators & Allied Workers Local 14
- IATSE Local 8
- ILA 1291
- IUBAC Local 1
- Laborers' District Councils 57, 332
- PASNAP
- Philadelphia Building and Construction Trades Council
- Sheet Metal Workers Local 19
- Teamsters Local 502
- TWU Local 234
- UA Steam and Sprinkler Fitters Locals 420, 692
- UA Plumbers Local 690
- UFCW Local 1776

Party branches

- Philadelphia City Democratic Committee

Newspapers

- Philadelphia Gay News
Dwight Evans (withdrawn)

Organizations

- J Street
Pablo McConnie-Saad (withdrawn)

Organizations

- Animal Wellness Action
Declined to endorse

Statewide officials

- Josh Shapiro, governor of Pennsylvania (2023–present)

==== Debates and forums ====
2026 PA-03 Democratic primary debates and forums
No.	Date	Host	Moderator	Link	Participants (Note: Republican candidate Alex Schnell also participated in the February 9 forum.)						
P Participant A Absent N Non-invitee I Invitee W Withdrawn											
P Participant A Absent N Non-invitee I Invitee W Withdrawn					Cephas	Griffith	McConnie-Saad	Oxman	Rabb	Stanford	Street
1	December 4, 2025	9th Ward; Democratic Committee	Stephanie Marudas		P	N	N	P	P	P	P
2	January 13, 2026	12th & 59th Ward; Democratic Committees	Andre Carroll		P	N	N	P	P	P	P
3	February 9, 2026	PoliticsPA, Center City Residents Association	Steve Ulrich, Gina Ceisler Shapiro, Dick Polman		P	N	P	P	A	P	P
4	February 23, 2026	21st Ward; Democratic Committee	Lou Agre		P	N	N	P	P	P	P
5	March 11, 2026	Mount Carmel Baptist Church	Sharrie Williams	WPVI-TV	P	N	N	P	P	P	P
6	March 18, 2026	Enon Tabernacle Baptist Church	Michael Fuller		P	N	W	W	P	P	P
7	April 14, 2026	G-Town Radio	Solomon Jones		W	P	W	W	P	P	P
8	April 20, 2026	24th & 27th Ward; Democratic Committees			W	N	W	W	P	P	P
9	April 28, 2026	WHYY-TV	Cherri Gregg; Avi Wolfman-Arent		W	N	W	W	P	A	P

==== Fundraising ====
Italics indicate a withdrawn, disqualified, or nonqualifying candidate.

Campaign finance reports as of December 31, 2025
Candidate	Raised	Spent	Cash on hand
Cole Carter (D)	$95,947 (Note: $90,000 of this total was self-funded by Carter)	$84,730	$11,216
Morgan Cephas (D)	$241,028	$132,370	$108,657
Jahmiel Jackson (D)	$15,368 (Note: $5,200 of this total was self-funded by Jackson)	$8,870	$6,498
Isaiah Martin (D)	$7,084 (Note: $1,679 of this total was self-funded by Martin)	$5,218	$1,865
Pablo McConnie-Saad (D)	$119,221	$50,402	$68,818
Karl Morris (D)	$49,658 (Note: $46,284 of this total was self-funded by Morris)	$33,371	$16,287
Dave Oxman (D)	$497,772 (Note: $177,379 of this total was self-funded by Oxman)	$140,774	$356,998
Chris Rabb (D)	$384,065	$285,344	$98,721
Ala Stanford (D)	$467,227 (Note: $250,190 of this total was self-funded by Stanford)	$75,190	$392,037
Sharif Street (D)	$700,845	$226,822	$526,581
Source: Federal Election Commission

==== Polling ====
Poll source	Date(s) administered	Sample size	Margin of error	Chris Rabb	Ala Stanford	Sharif Street	Other	Undecided
Public Policy Polling (D) (Note: Poll commissioned by 314 Action, which supports Stanford)	April 1–2, 2026	600 (LV)	–	23%	28%	16%	–	33%
Lake Research Partners (D) (Note: Poll commissioned by Street's campaign)	August 6–12, 2025	500 (LV)	± 4%	17%	11%	22%	9% (Note: Morgan Cephas with 7%; Dave Oxman with 2%;)	41%

Hypothetical polling

Poll source	Date(s) administered	Sample size	Margin of error	Katherine Gilmore Richardson	Chris Rabb	Ala Stanford	Sharif Street	Isaiah Thomas	Undecided
Brilliant Corners Research & Strategies (D) (Note: Poll commissioned by Black Leadership Pennsylvania)	August 6–12, 2025	584 (RV)	± 4.8%	5%	6%	7%	15%	7%	51%

==== Results ====
Primary results by precinct Rabb: 30–40%; 40–50%; 50–60%; 60–70%; 70–80%; 80–90%; Street: 30–40%; 40–50%; 50–60%; 60–70%; 70–80%; 80–90%; 90–100%; Stanford: 30–40%; 40–50%; 50–60%; 60–70%; Tie: 30–40%; 40–50%

Democratic primary results
Party	Candidate	Votes	%
Democratic	Chris Rabb	65,782	44.6
Democratic	Sharif Street	43,137	29.3
Democratic	Ala Stanford	35,452	24.0
Democratic	Shaun Griffith	3,042	2.1
Total votes		147,413	100.0

=== Republican primary ===
==== Failed to qualify ====
- Alex Schnell

=== Independents ===
- Dennis Mahoney, humanitarian aid worker

=== General election ===
==== Predictions ====
Source	Ranking	As of
Decision Desk HQ	Safe D	July 14, 2026
The Cook Political Report	Solid D	September 11, 2025
Inside Elections	Solid D	September 11, 2025
Sabato's Crystal Ball	Safe D	April 10, 2025
Silver Bulletin	Solid D	August 20, 2026

==== Post-primary endorsements ====
Chris Rabb (D)

Labor unions

- National Education Association

Organizations

- Progressive Victory
Dennis Mahoney (I)

Political parties

- Forward Party

==== Fundraising ====
Campaign finance reports as of September 30, 2026
Candidate	Raised	Spent	Cash on hand
Chris Rabb (D)	$1,410,095	$1,361,391	$48,705
Source: Federal Election Commission

==== Results ====
2026 Pennsylvania's 3rd congressional district election
Party	Candidate	Votes	%	±%
Democratic	Chris Rabb			
Independent	Dennis Mahoney			N/A
Total votes				

== District 4 ==
2026 Pennsylvania's 4th congressional district election
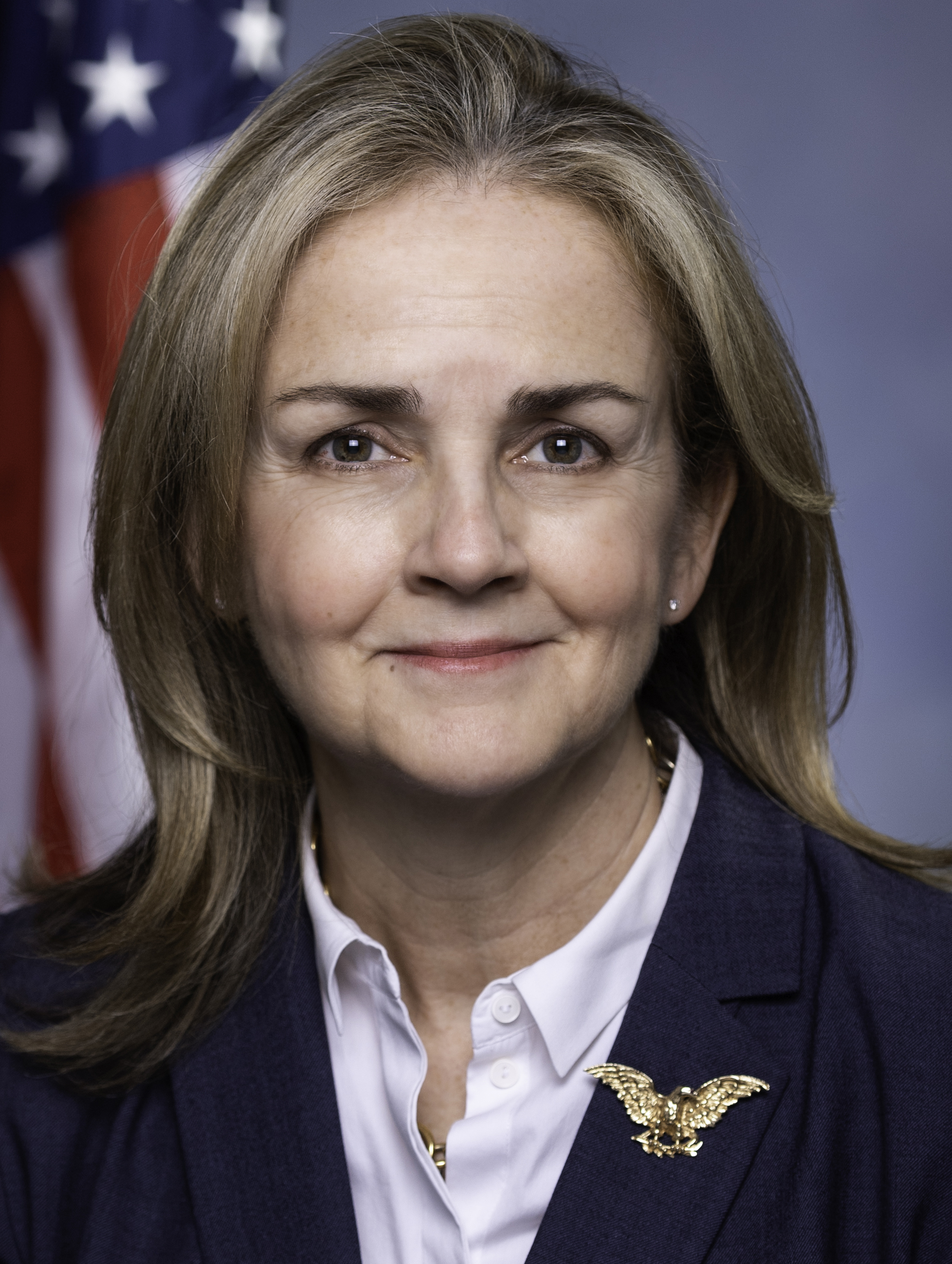

Nominee	Madeleine Dean	Aurora Stuski
Party	Democratic	Republican
- County results Dean: 70–80% Stuski: 50–60%
Incumbent U.S. Representative
Madeleine Dean
Democratic

The 4th district is based in the western suburbs of Philadelphia, including most of Montgomery County and parts of Berks County. The incumbent is Democrat Madeleine Dean, who was re-elected with 59.1% of the vote in 2024.

=== Democratic primary ===
==== Nominee ====
- Madeleine Dean, incumbent U.S. representative

==== Endorsements ====
Madeleine Dean

U.S. representatives

- Gabby Giffords, former AZ-08 (2007–2012)

Organizations

- Giffords
- J Street
- Planned Parenthood Action Fund

==== Fundraising ====
Campaign finance reports as of December 31, 2025
Candidate	Raised	Spent	Cash on hand
Madeleine Dean (D)	$810,820	$687,242	$1,092,319
Source: Federal Election Commission

==== Results ====
Democratic primary results
Party	Candidate	Votes	%
Democratic	Madeleine Dean (incumbent)	88,286	100.0
Total votes		88,286	100.0

=== Republican primary ===
==== Nominee ====
- Aurora Stuski, gemologist

==== Fundraising ====
Italics indicates a nonqualifying candidate.

Campaign finance reports as of March 31, 2025
Candidate	Raised	Spent	Cash on hand
Ismaine Ayouaz (R)	$0	$99	$0
Source: Federal Election Commission

==== Results ====
Republican primary results
Party	Candidate	Votes	%
Republican	Aurora Stuski	35,116	100.0
Total votes		35,116	100.0

=== General election ===
==== Predictions ====
Source	Ranking	As of
Decision Desk HQ	Safe D	July 14, 2026
The Cook Political Report	Solid D	September 11, 2025
Inside Elections	Solid D	September 11, 2025
Sabato's Crystal Ball	Safe D	April 10, 2025
Silver Bulletin	Solid D	August 20, 2026

==== Post-primary endorsements ====
Madeleine Dean (D)

Labor unions

- National Education Association

Organizations

- National Women's Political Caucus

==== Fundraising ====
Campaign finance reports as of September 30, 2026
Candidate	Raised	Spent	Cash on hand
Madeleine Dean (D)	$1,877,395	$1,431,649	$1,414,487
Aurora Stuski (R)	$8,800	$7,312	$4,195
Source: Federal Election Commission

==== Results ====
2026 Pennsylvania's 4th congressional district election
Party	Candidate	Votes	%	±%
Democratic	Madeleine Dean (incumbent)			
Republican	Aurora Stuski			
Total votes				

== District 5 ==
2026 Pennsylvania's 5th congressional district election
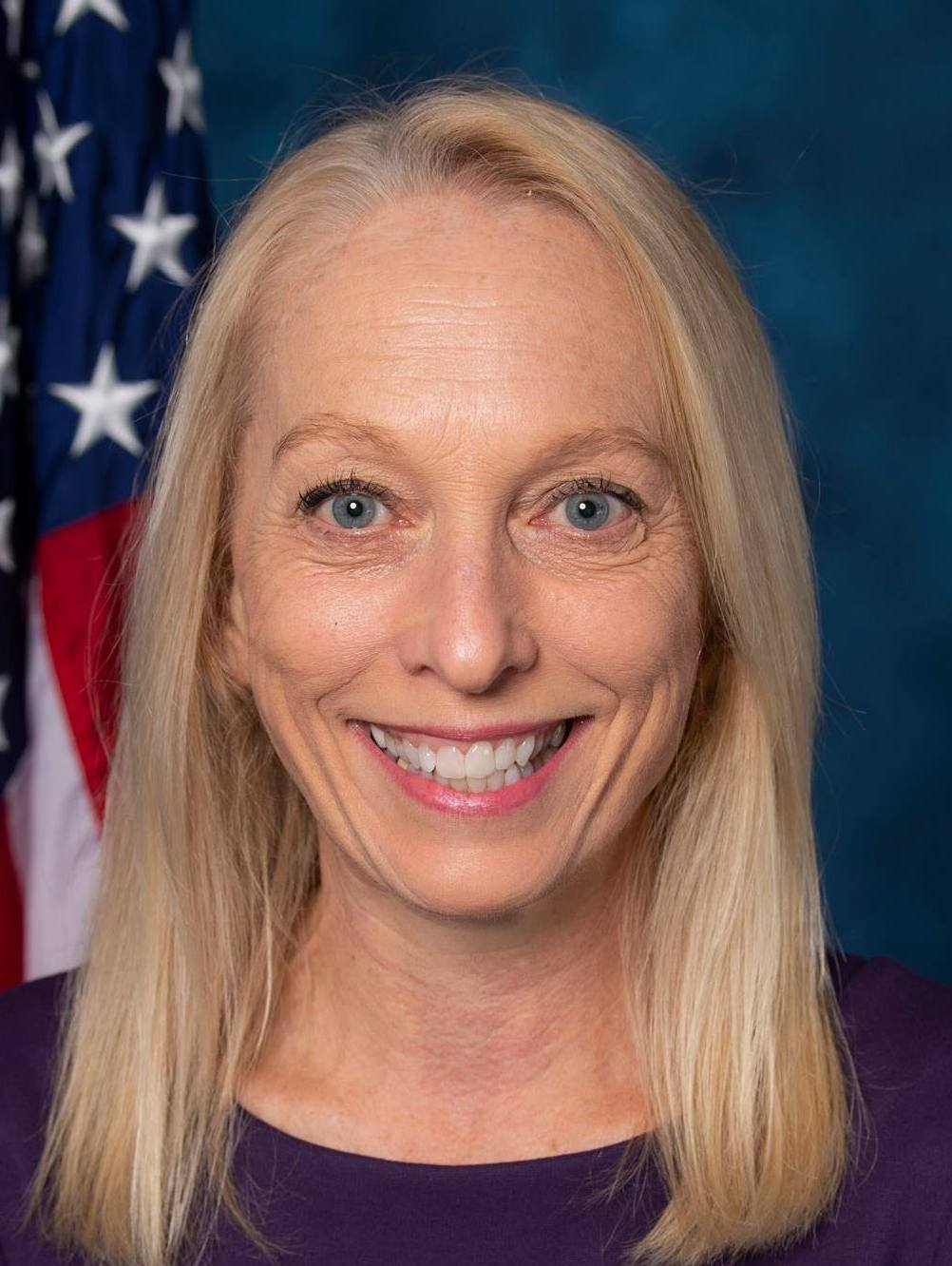

Nominee	Mary Gay Scanlon	Nicholas Manganaro
Party	Democratic	Republican
- County results Scanlon: 60–70% 80–90%
Incumbent U.S. Representative
Mary Gay Scanlon
Democratic

The 5th district is based in the southwestern suburbs of Philadelphia, including all of Delaware County, parts of Montgomery County, and parts of south Philadelphia. The incumbent is Democrat Mary Gay Scanlon, who was re-elected with 65.3% of the vote in 2024.

=== Democratic primary ===
==== Nominee ====
- Mary Gay Scanlon, incumbent U.S. representative

==== Endorsements ====
Mary Gay Scanlon

Organizations

- J Street
- National Women's Political Caucus
- Planned Parenthood Action Fund

==== Fundraising ====
Campaign finance reports as of December 31, 2025
Candidate	Raised	Spent	Cash on hand
Mary Gay Scanlon (D)	$580,819	$530,088	$368,477
Source: Federal Election Commission

==== Results ====
Democratic primary results
Party	Candidate	Votes	%
Democratic	Mary Gay Scanlon (incumbent)	76,009	100.0
Total votes		76,009	100.0

=== Republican primary ===
==== Nominee ====
- Nicholas Manganaro, retired financial professional

==== Results ====
Republican primary results
Party	Candidate	Votes	%
Republican	Nicholas Manganaro	25,075	100.0
Total votes		25,075	100.0

=== General election ===
==== Predictions ====
Source	Ranking	As of
Decision Desk HQ	Safe D	July 14, 2026
The Cook Political Report	Solid D	September 11, 2025
Inside Elections	Solid D	September 11, 2025
Sabato's Crystal Ball	Safe D	April 10, 2025
Silver Bulletin	Solid D	August 20, 2026

==== Post-primary endorsements ====
Mary Gay Scanlon (D)

Labor unions

- National Education Association

==== Fundraising ====
Campaign finance reports as of September 30, 2026
Candidate	Raised	Spent	Cash on hand
Mary Gay Scanlon (D)	$1,264,667	$1,122,884	$459,529
Nicholas Manganaro (R)	$21,043	$10,275	$10,768
Source: Federal Election Commission

==== Results ====
2026 Pennsylvania's 5th congressional district election
Party	Candidate	Votes	%	±%
Democratic	Mary Gay Scanlon (incumbent)			
Republican	Nicholas Manganaro			
Total votes				

== District 6 ==
2026 Pennsylvania's 6th congressional district election
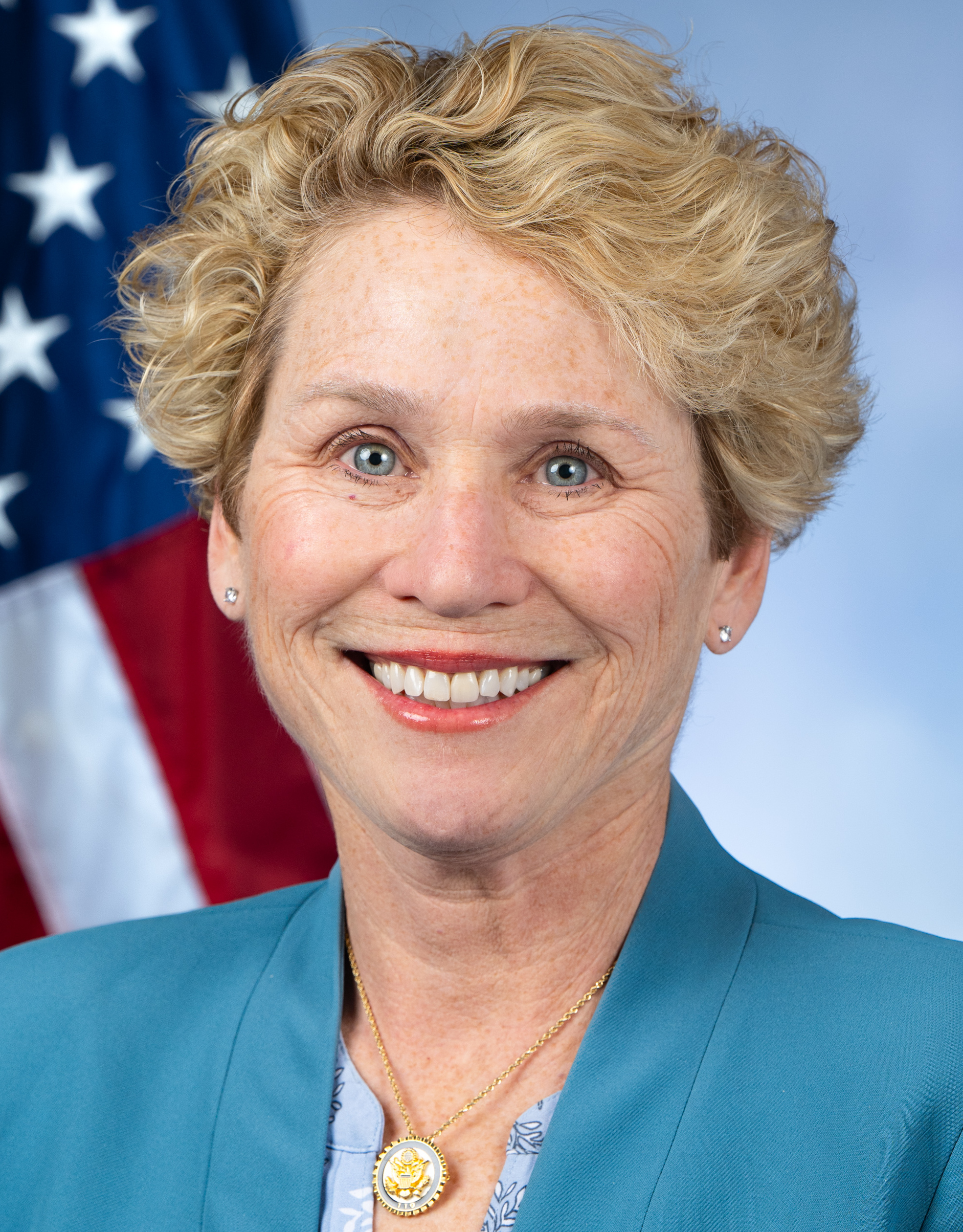

Nominee	Chrissy Houlahan	Marty Young
Party	Democratic	Republican
- County results Houlahan: 50–60% 60–70%
Incumbent U.S. Representative
Chrissy Houlahan
Democratic

The 6th district includes all of Chester County and the city of Reading in Berks County. The incumbent is Democrat Chrissy Houlahan, who was re-elected with 56.2% of the vote in 2024.

=== Democratic primary ===
==== Nominee ====
- Chrissy Houlahan, incumbent U.S. representative

==== Endorsements ====
Chrissy Houlahan

Organizations

- Democratic Majority for Israel
- Giffords
- J Street

==== Fundraising ====
Campaign finance reports as of December 31, 2025
Candidate	Raised	Spent	Cash on hand
Chrissy Houlahan (D)	$1,095,399	$648,644	$3,852,368
Source: Federal Election Commission

==== Results ====
Democratic primary results
Party	Candidate	Votes	%
Democratic	Chrissy Houlahan (incumbent)	63,022	100.0
Total votes		63,022	100.0

=== Republican primary ===
==== Nominee ====
- Marty Young, business consulting executive

==== Endorsements ====
Marty Young

U.S. Senators

- Dave McCormick, Pennsylvania (2025-present)

Local officials

- Eric Roe, Chester County Board of Commissioners (2023-present)
- Lisha Rowe, Cumru Township, Pennsylvania Commissioner (2024-present)

Political parties

- Republican Committee of Chester County
- Berks County Republican Committee

Organizations

- Fraternal Order of Police Lodge #11
- Chester County Young Republicans
- Pennsylvania State Education Association

==== Fundraising ====
Campaign finance reports as of December 31, 2025
Candidate	Raised	Spent	Cash on hand
Marty Young (R)	$249,257	$84,904	$164,352
Source: Federal Election Commission

==== Results ====
Republican primary results
Party	Candidate	Votes	%
Republican	Marty Young	33,376	100.0
Total votes		33,376	100.0

=== General election ===
==== Predictions ====
Source	Ranking	As of
Decision Desk HQ	Safe D	July 14, 2026
The Cook Political Report	Solid D	September 11, 2025
Inside Elections	Solid D	September 11, 2025
Sabato's Crystal Ball	Safe D	April 10, 2025
Silver Bulletin	Solid D	August 20, 2026

==== Post-primary endorsements ====
Chrissy Houlahan (D)

Labor unions

- National Education Association

==== Fundraising ====
Campaign finance reports as of September 30, 2026
Candidate	Raised	Spent	Cash on hand
Chrissy Houlahan (D)	$2,046,194	$1,337,508	$4,114,299
Marty Young (R)	$457,421	$328,607	$128,814
Source: Federal Election Commission

==== Results ====
2026 Pennsylvania's 6th congressional district election
Party	Candidate	Votes	%	±%
Democratic	Chrissy Houlahan (incumbent)			
Republican	Marty Young			
Total votes				

== District 7 ==
2026 Pennsylvania's 7th congressional district election

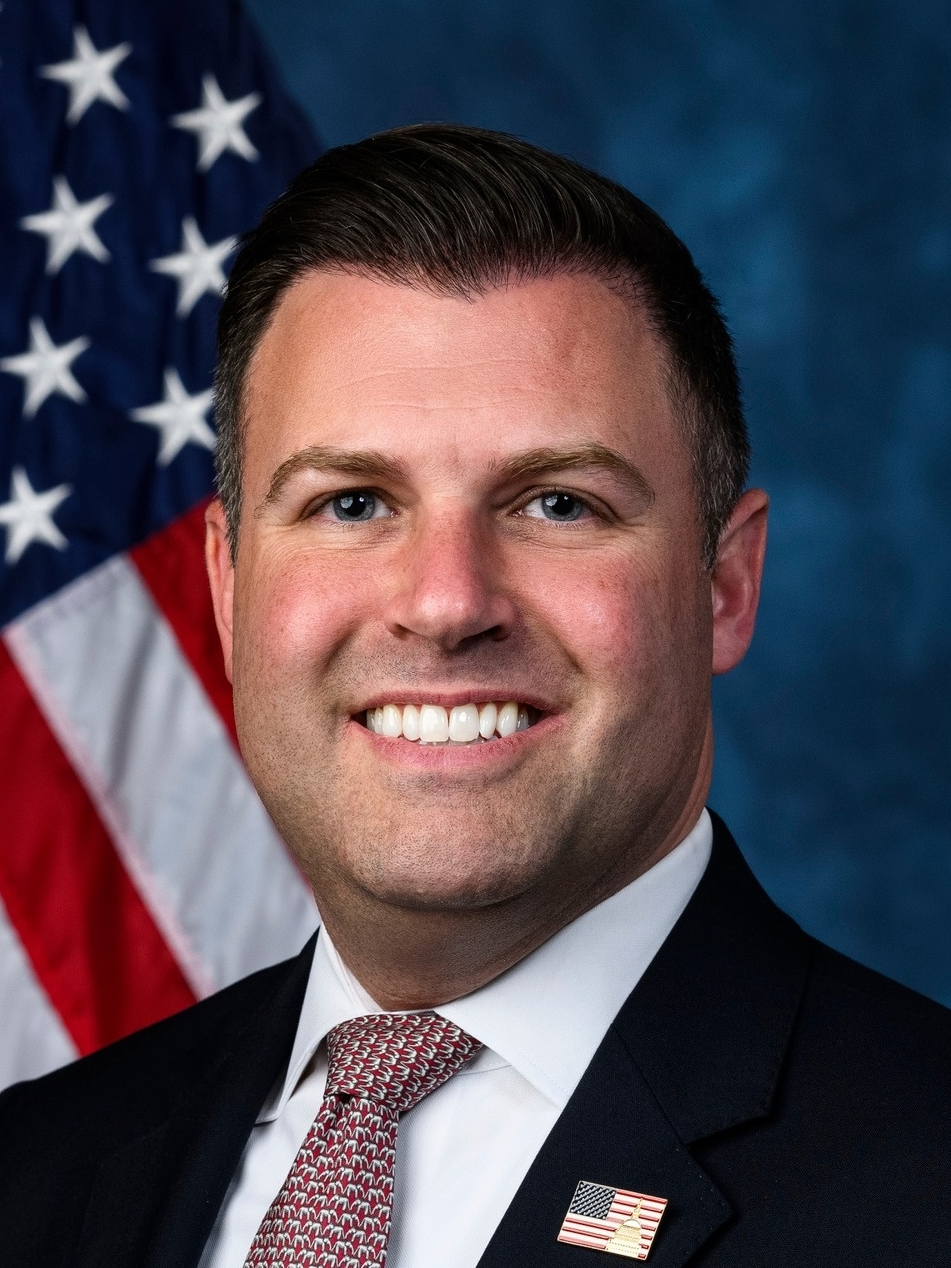
Nominee	Bob Brooks	Ryan Mackenzie
Party	Democratic	Republican
Popular vote	164,543	128,738
Percentage	56.1%	43.9%
- County results Brooks: 50–60% Mackenzie: 60–70%
U.S. Representative before election
Ryan Mackenzie
Republican
Elected U.S. Representative
Bob Brooks
Democratic

The 7th district is based in the Lehigh Valley, including all of Lehigh, Northampton, and Carbon counties and a small sliver of Monroe County. The incumbent is Republican Ryan Mackenzie, who flipped the district and was elected with 50.5% of the vote in 2024.

=== Republican primary ===
==== Nominee ====
- Ryan Mackenzie, incumbent U.S. representative

==== Endorsements ====
Ryan Mackenzie

Executive branch officials

- Donald Trump, president of the United States (2017–2021, 2025–present)

U.S. representatives

- Mike Johnson, speaker of the House (2023–present) from LA-04 (2017–present)

Organizations

- Log Cabin Republicans
- Republican Jewish Coalition

==== Fundraising ====
Campaign finance reports as of December 31, 2025
Candidate	Raised	Spent	Cash on hand
Ryan Mackenzie (R)	$2,577,819	$850,071	$1,830,988
Source: Federal Election Commission

==== Results ====
Republican primary results
Party	Candidate	Votes	%
Republican	Ryan Mackenzie (incumbent)	35,048	100.0
Total votes		35,048	100.0

=== Democratic primary ===
==== Nominee ====
- Bob Brooks, president of the Pennsylvania Professional Firefighters Association

==== Eliminated in primary ====
- Ryan Crosswell, former federal prosecutor
- Lamont McClure, former Northampton County Executive (2018–2026)
- Carol Obando-Derstine, former member of the Pennsylvania Advisory Commission on Latino Affairs

==== Withdrawn ====
- Mark Pinsley, Lehigh County Controller (2020–present), nominee for Pennsylvania's 16th senate district in 2018 and 2022, and candidate for Pennsylvania Auditor General in 2024 (running for state senate)

==== Declined ====
- Susan Wild, former U.S. Representative (2018–2025) (endorsed Obando-Derstine)

==== Endorsements ====
Bob Brooks

Executive branch officials

- Pete Buttigieg, former secretary of transportation (2021–2025)

U.S. senators

- Chris Coons, Delaware (2010–present)
- Ruben Gallego, Arizona (2025–present)
- Chris Murphy, Connecticut (2013–present)
- Bernie Sanders, Vermont (2007–present) (Independent)
- Elizabeth Warren, Massachusetts (2013–present)

U.S. representatives

- Madeleine Dean, PA-04 (2019–present)
- Suzan DelBene, WA-01 (2012–present)
- Chris Deluzio, PA-17 (2023–present)
- Maxwell Frost, FL-10 (2023–present)
- Chrissy Houlahan, PA-06 (2019–present)
- Val Hoyle, OR-04 (2023–present)
- Pramila Jayapal, WA-07 (2017–present)
- Ro Khanna, CA-17 (2017–present)
- Jamie Raskin, MD-08 (2017–present)

Statewide officials

- Austin Davis, lieutenant governor of Pennsylvania (2023–present)
- Josh Shapiro, governor of Pennsylvania (2023–present)

State legislators

- Matt Bradford, House majority leader from HD-70 (2009–present)
- 2 state senators (Note: Vincent Hughes, SD-07 (1994–present); Steve Santarsiero, SD-10 (2019–present))
- 8 state representatives (Note: Mary Isaacson, HD-175 (2019–present); Tarik Khan, HD-194 (2023–present); Bridget Malloy Kosierowski, HD-114 (2019–present); Robert Merski, HD-02 (2019–present); Jennifer O'Mara, HD-165 (2019–present); Michael Schlossberg, HD-132 (2013–present); Peter Schweyer, HD-22 (2015–present); Jared Solomon, HD-202 (2017–present))

Local officials

- Matthew Tuerk, mayor of Allentown (2022–present)

Labor unions

- International Association of Fire Fighters Local 22
- National Nurses United
- Pennsylvania Conference of Teamsters
- Service Employees International Union Pennsylvania State Council
- Steamfitters Local 420
- Teamsters Local 773

Organizations

- Blue Dog PAC
- Congressional Progressive Caucus PAC
- DCCC Red to Blue
- End Citizens United
- Our Revolution
- Progressive Democrats of America

Political parties

- Working Families Party
Ryan Crosswell

Executive branch officials

- Alex Vindman, former Director of European Affairs for the United States National Security Council (2018–2020)

U.S. representatives

- Matt Cartwright, former PA-08 (2013–2025)
- Max Rose, former NY-11 (2019–2021)
- Derek Tran, CA-45 (2025–present)

Organizations

- VoteVets
Lamont McClure

State legislators

- Keith R. McCall, former speaker of the Pennsylvania House of Representatives (2009–2010) from HD-122 (1982–2010)
- T.J. Rooney, former HD-133 (1993–2010) and former chair of the Pennsylvania Democratic Party (2003–2010)
- Joshua Siegel, former HD-22 (2023–2025) and Lehigh County Executive (2026–present)

Local officials

- Robert Donchez, former mayor of Bethlehem (2014–2022)
- Salvatore Panto, mayor of Easton (2008–present)

Labor unions

- International Brotherhood of Electrical Workers
- International Union of Operating Engineers
- United Steelworkers
Carol Obando-Derstine

U.S. representatives

- Nanette Barragan, CA-44 (2017–present)
- Tony Cárdenas, former CA-29 (2013–2025)
- Veronica Escobar, TX-16 (2019–present)
- Raul Ruiz, CA-25 (2013–present)
- Andrea Salinas, OR-06 (2023–present)
- Linda Sánchez, CA-38 (2003–present)
- Allyson Schwartz, former PA-13 (2005–2015)
- Susan Wild, former PA-07 (2018–2025)

State legislators

- Danilo Burgos, HD-197 (2019–present)
- Johanny Cepeda-Freytiz, HD-129 (2023–present)

Local officials

- Quetcy Lozada, Philadelphia City Councilmember (2022–present)
- Eddie Moran, mayor of Reading (2020–present)

Individuals

- Gregory James Edwards, pastor

Organizations

- 314 Action Fund
- Congressional Hispanic Caucus BOLD PAC
- Elect Democratic Women
- EMILYs List
- Latino Victory Fund
- PODER PAC
Mark Pinsley (withdrawn)

Organizations

- Democratic Socialists of America
- Progressive Democrats of America
- Patriotic Millionaires
- Vote Common Good

==== Debates and forums ====
2026 PA-07 Democratic primary debates and forums
No.	Date	Host	Moderator	Link	Participants						
P Participant A Absent N Non-invitee I Invitee W Withdrawn											
P Participant A Absent N Non-invitee I Invitee W Withdrawn					Brooks	Crosswell	Gonzalez	McClure	Obando- Derstine	Pinsley	Shupe
1	February 16, 2026	Working Families Power, et al.	Rev. Gregory Edwards		P	P	P	P	P	P	P
2	April 1, 2026	Business Matters	Tony Iannelli		P	P	W	P	P	W	W
3	April 7, 2026	Lehigh County Democratic Committee	Ryan Gaylor	Link	P	P	W	P	P	W	W
4	April 23, 2026	Blue Ridge Communications	Kim Bell		P	P	W	P	P	W	W

==== Fundraising ====
Italics indicate a withdrawn candidate.

Campaign finance reports as of December 31, 2025
Candidate	Raised	Spent	Cash on hand
Bob Brooks (D)	$609,957	$269,189	$340,767
Ryan Crosswell (D)	$1,144,864	$532,615	$612,249
Lamont McClure (D)	$480,615	$193,025	$287,590
Carol Obando-Derstine (D)	$431,919	$308,411	$123,508
Mark Pinsley (D)	$125,194	$75,177	$50,017
Source: Federal Election Commission

==== Polling ====
Poll source	Date(s) administered	Sample size	Margin of error	Bob Brooks	Ryan Crosswell	Lamont McClure	Carol Obando- Derstine	Other	Undecided
Tavern Research (D)	May 17, 2026	613 (LV)	± 4.4%	26%	16%	17%	8%	1%	31%
GBAO (D) (Note: Poll sponsored by the Congressional Progressive Caucus PAC, which supports Brooks)	April 16–19, 2026	400 (LV)	± 4.9%	24%	9%	17%	12%	2%	36%
GBAO (D)	February 25 – March 1, 2026	500 (LV)	± 4.4%	13%	8%	19%	13%	3%	44%
Change Research (D) (Note: Poll sponsored by Brooks' campaign)	December 16–19, 2025	892 (LV)	± 3.5%	11%	5%	17%	10%	3% (Note: "Would not vote" with 3%)	53%
Public Policy Polling (D) (Note: Poll sponsored by McClure's campaign)	July 29–30, 2025	518 (LV)	± 4.3%	3%	3%	23%	7%	7% (Note: Mark Pinsley with 7%)	58%

==== Results ====
Results by county: Brooks: 30–40%; 40–50%

Democratic primary results
Party	Candidate	Votes	%
Democratic	Bob Brooks	28,232	41.0
Democratic	Ryan Crosswell	14,660	21.3
Democratic	Lamont McClure	13,736	19.9
Democratic	Carol Obando-Derstine	12,237	17.8
Total votes		68,865	100.0

=== Green Party ===
Andrew Tupone filed nomination papers with nearly 11,000 signatures to appear on the ballot as the Green Party candidate, though the party disavowed his candidacy and said he did not represent it. Tupone, a former Republican, changed his registration to Green in April 2026. Democrats accused him of running as a spoiler candidate to siphon votes from Bob Brooks, noting that he was represented by a Republican-affiliated attorney and that several of his petition circulators were Republicans. Commonwealth Court Judge Stella Tsai ruled that Tupone was ineligible to appear on the ballot under the Green Party label because the party had not selected him as its candidate. Tupone appealed to the Pennsylvania Supreme Court which upheld the ruling. He has said he intends to mount a write-in campaign.

==== Disqualified ====
- Andrew Tupone, Republican nominee for magestrial court in Northampton County in 2021

=== General election ===
==== Predictions ====
Source	Ranking	As of
Decision Desk HQ	Likely D (flip)	October 30, 2026
The Cook Political Report	Lean D (flip)	October 9, 2026
Inside Elections	Tilt D (flip)	October 15, 2026
Sabato's Crystal Ball	Lean D (flip)	September 29, 2026
Silver Bulletin	Lean D (flip)	August 20, 2026

==== Post-primary endorsements ====
Ryan Mackenzie (R)

Organizations

- U.S. Chamber of Commerce
Bob Brooks (D)

Newspapers

- The Philadelphia Inquirer

Labor unions

- National Education Association

Organizations

- J Street
- Jewish Democratic Council of America

==== Fundraising ====
Campaign finance reports as of October 14, 2026
Candidate	Raised	Spent	Cash on hand
Ryan Mackenzie (R)	$5,296,664	$4,329,911	$1,069,993
Bob Brooks (D)	$5,347,353	$4,605,775	$741,579
Source: Federal Election Commission

==== Polling ====
Poll source	Date(s) administered	Sample size	Margin of error	Ryan Mackenzie (R)	Bob Brooks (D)	Other	Undecided
RedBox Research (D)	October 20–23, 2026	644 (LV)	± 4.8%	44%	49%	5% (Note: "Someone else" with 2%; "Prefer not to answer" with 2%; "Did not vote in this race" with 1%)	3%
New York Times/The Philadelphia Inquirer/Siena University	October 16–22, 2026	400 (LV)	± 5.7%	44%	49%	0%	6%
Muhlenberg College Institute of Public Opinion	October 6–15, 2026	529 (LV)	± 5.0%	43%	49%	3% (Note: "Neither/Other")	5%
Franklin & Marshall College	September 9–20, 2026	357 (RV)	± 5.8%	40%	45%	–	15%
GBAO (D)	June 29–July 2, 2026	550 (LV)	–	43%	47%	–	10%

==== Results ====
2026 Pennsylvania's 7th congressional district election
Party	Candidate	Votes	%	±%
Republican	Ryan Mackenzie (incumbent)			
Democratic	Bob Brooks			
Total votes				

== District 8 ==
2026 Pennsylvania's 8th congressional district election
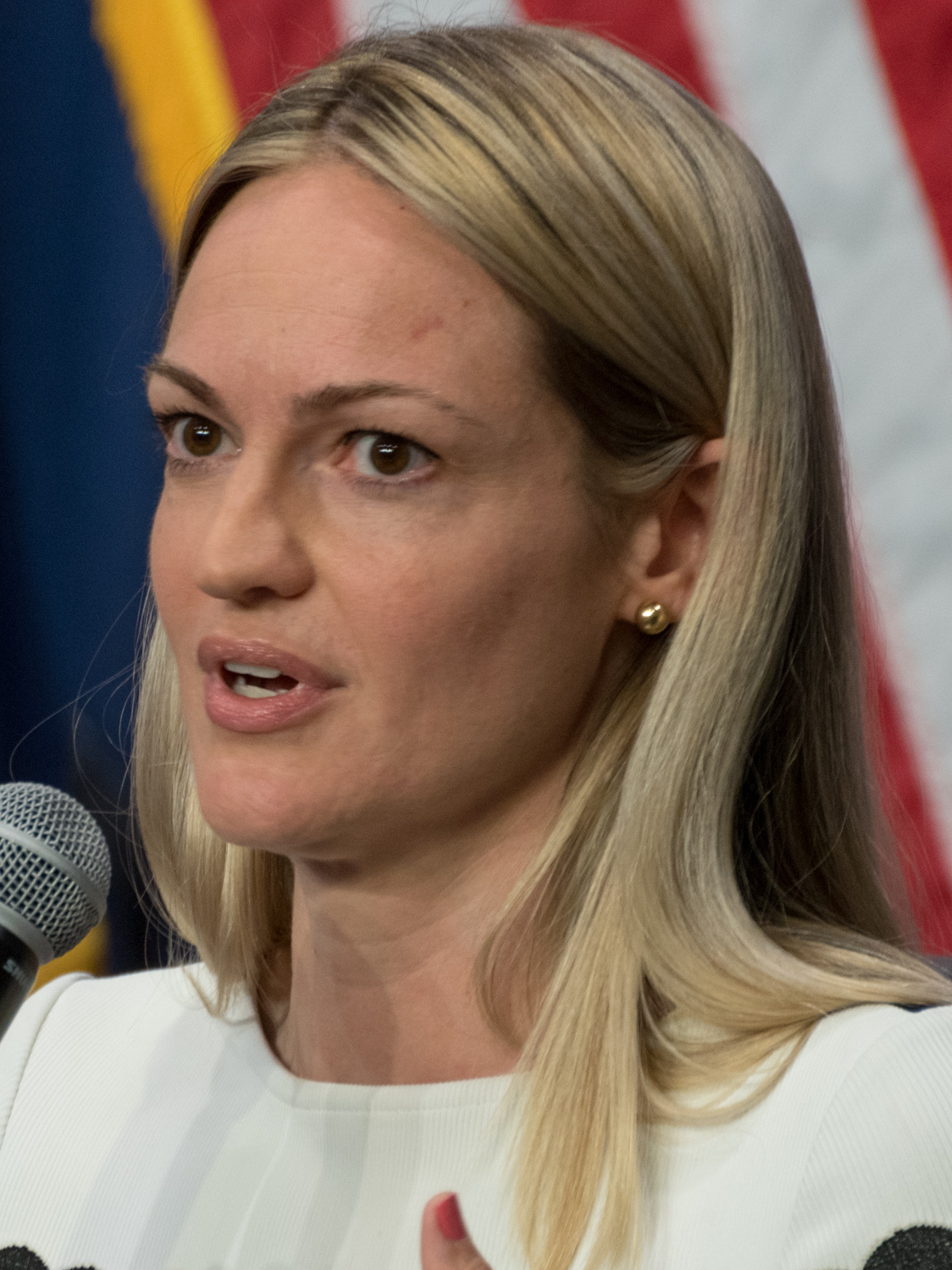

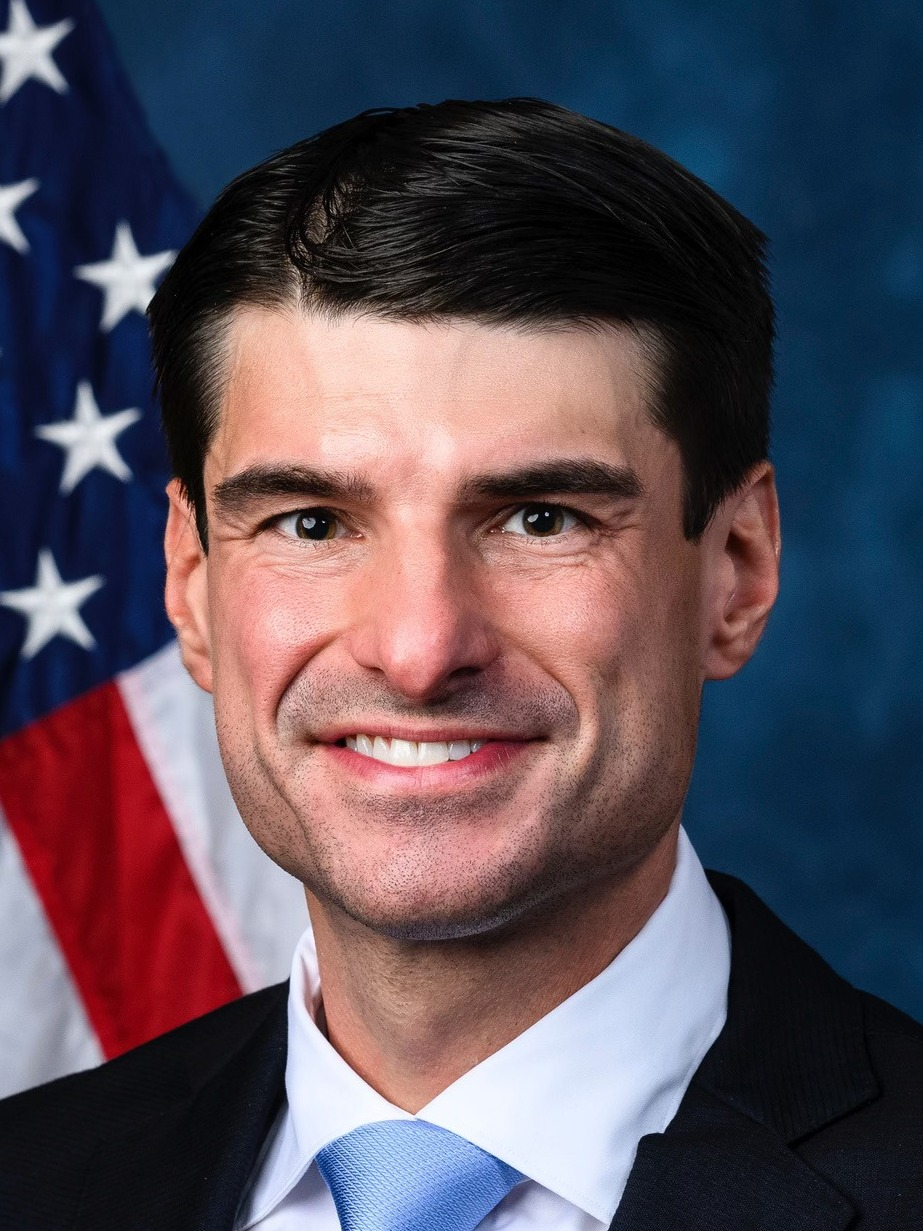
Nominee	Paige Cognetti	Rob Bresnahan
Party	Democratic	Republican
Popular vote	154,060	128,739
Percentage	54.5%	45.5%
- Cognetti: 40–50% 50–60% 60–70% 70–80% 80–90% Bresnahan: 40–50% 50–60% 60–70% 70–80%
U.S. Representative before election
Rob Bresnahan
Republican
Elected U.S. Representative
Paige Cognetti
Democratic

The 8th district is based in Northeast Pennsylvania, specifically the Wyoming Valley and Pocono Mountains, including all of Lackawanna, Wayne, and Pike counties, and most of Luzerne and Monroe counties. The incumbent is Republican Rob Bresnahan, who flipped the district in the 2024 election with 50.8% of the vote.

=== Republican primary ===
==== Nominee ====
- Rob Bresnahan, incumbent U.S. representative

==== Endorsements ====
Rob Bresnahan

Executive branch officials

- Donald Trump, president of the United States (2017–2021, 2025–present)

U.S. representatives

- Mike Johnson, speaker of the House (2023–present) from LA-04 (2017–present)

Labor unions

- American Federation of Government Employees
- Brotherhood of Railroad Signalmen
- Boilermakers Local 13
- IBEW Local 163
- International Union of Operating Engineers Local 542
- National Electrical Contractors Association
- Pennsylvania Laborers' District Council

Organizations

- Republican Jewish Coalition

==== Fundraising ====
Campaign finance reports as of December 31, 2025
Candidate	Raised	Spent	Cash on hand
Rob Bresnahan (R)	$2,998,394	$1,614,408	$1,437,137
Source: Federal Election Commission

==== Results ====
Republican primary results
Party	Candidate	Votes	%
Republican	Rob Bresnahan (incumbent)	38,075	100.0
Total votes		38,075	100.0

=== Democratic primary ===
==== Nominee ====
- Paige Cognetti, mayor of Scranton (2020–present)

==== Withdrawn ====
- Francis McHale, retired state administrative officer and candidate for the 10th district in 2000

==== Declined ====
- Marty Flynn, state senator from the 22nd district (2021–present)
- Matt Cartwright, former U.S. Representative (2013–2025) (endorsed Cognetti)
- Bill Gaughan, Lackawanna County commissioner
- Michael Lombardo, mayor of Pittston (2018–present)

==== Endorsements ====
Paige Cognetti

U.S. senators

- Mark Kelly, Arizona (2020–present)

U.S. representatives

- Matt Cartwright, former PA-08 (2013–2025)
- Suzan DelBene, WA-01 (2012–present)
- Chris Deluzio, PA-17 (2023–present)
- Gabby Giffords, former AZ-08 (2007–2012)
- Greg Stanton, AZ-04 (2019–present)

Statewide officials

- Austin Davis, lieutenant governor of Pennsylvania (2023–present)
- Josh Shapiro, governor of Pennsylvania (2023–present)

Labor unions

- Ironworkers Local 404
- International Union of Painters and Allied Trades District Council 21
- Pennsylvania Association of Staff Nurses and Allied Professionals
- ~~Pennsylvania Conference of Teamsters~~ (switched endorsement to Bresnahan)
- Pennsylvania State Education Association
- SEIU Pennsylvania State Council

Organizations

- DCCC Red to Blue
- Democrats for Education Reform
- Democratic Majority for Israel
- Elect Democratic Women
- EMILYs List
- End Citizens United
- Giffords
- J Street
- League of Conservation Voters Action Fund
- New Democrat Coalition
- Vote Mama
- WelcomePAC

==== Fundraising ====
Campaign finance reports as of March 31, 2026
Candidate	Raised	Spent	Cash on hand
Paige Cognetti (D)	$2,607,715	$682,856	$1,924,859
Source: Federal Election Commission

==== Results ====
Democratic primary results
Party	Candidate	Votes	%
Democratic	Paige Cognetti	58,726	100.0
Total votes		58,726	100.0

=== General election ===
==== Predictions ====
Source	Ranking	As of
Decision Desk HQ	Lean D (flip)	November 3, 2026
The Cook Political Report	Lean D (flip)	October 30, 2026
Inside Elections	Tilt D (flip)	October 15, 2026
Sabato's Crystal Ball	Lean D (flip)	October 27, 2026
Silver Bulletin	Lean D (flip)	August 20, 2026

==== Post-primary endorsements ====
Rob Bresnahan (R)

Labor unions

- Amalgamated Transit Union
- American Maritime Officers
- Eastern Atlantic States Regional Council of Carpenters
- Fraternal Order of Police Lodges 18, 36, 38, 43, 46, 75
- IBEW Local 1319
- International Organization of Masters, Mates & Pilots
- Marine Engineers' Beneficial Association
- Seafarers International Union
- Pennsylvania Conference of Teamsters (previously endorsed Cognetti)
- Pennsylvania State Troopers Association

Organizations

- National Federation of Independent Businesses
- U.S. Chamber of Commerce
Paige Cognetti (D)

Labor unions

- AFSCME
- Association of Flight Attendants
- Communications Workers of America
- Pennsylvania State Council of Machinists
- SMART
- National Education Association
- Pennsylvania AFL-CIO
- Pipefitters and Plumbers Local 524
- United Autoworkers Lehigh Valley Northeast PA CAP Council
- United Food and Commercial Workers Local 1776
- United Steelworkers

Organizations

- Brady PAC
- Human Rights Campaign
- Jewish Democratic Council of America
Declined to endorsed

Labor unions

- Northeast Pennsylvania Building & Construction Trades Council

==== Fundraising ====
Campaign finance reports as of October 14, 2026
Candidate	Raised	Spent	Cash on hand
Rob Bresnahan (R)	$6,519,139	$5,839,568	$732,724
Paige Cognetti (D)	$7,502,359	$7,258,687	$243,672
Source: Federal Election Commission

==== Debates ====
2026 Pennsylvania's 8th congressional district debate
No.	Date	Host	Moderator	Link	Republican	Democratic
Key: P Participant A Absent N Not invited I Invited W Withdrawn						
Key: P Participant A Absent N Not invited I Invited W Withdrawn					Bresnahan	Cognetti
1	Oct. 29, 2026	WVIA-TV	Tracey Matisak	YouTube	P	P

==== Polling ====
Poll source	Date(s) administered	Sample size	Margin of error	Rob Bresnahan (R)	Paige Cognetti (D)	Other	Undecided
RedBox Research (D)	October 20-23, 2026	696 (LV)	± 4.6%	46%	49%	3% (Note: "Someone else" with 2%; "Prefer not to answer" with 1%)	3%
New York Times/The Philadelphia Inquirer/Siena University	October 16–22, 2026	400 (LV)	± 5.7%	46%	51%	0%	3%
Emerson College (Note: Poll sponsored by Poll Vault)	October 12–14, 2026	396 (LV)	–	48%	52%	–	–
Lake Research Partners (D)	June 18–23, 2026	400 (V)	–	45%	47%	–	8%
Impact Research (D) (Note: Poll sponsored by Cognetti's campaign)	June 8–11, 2026	500 (LV)	± 4.4%	45%	46%	–	9%
	May 19, 2026	Primary elections are held					
Public Policy Polling (D)	August 27–28, 2025	615 (V)	–	43%	45%	–	13%

==== Results ====
2026 Pennsylvania's 8th congressional district election
Party	Candidate	Votes	%	±%
Republican	Rob Bresnahan (incumbent)			
Democratic	Paige Cognetti			
Total votes				

== District 9 ==
2026 Pennsylvania's 9th congressional district election
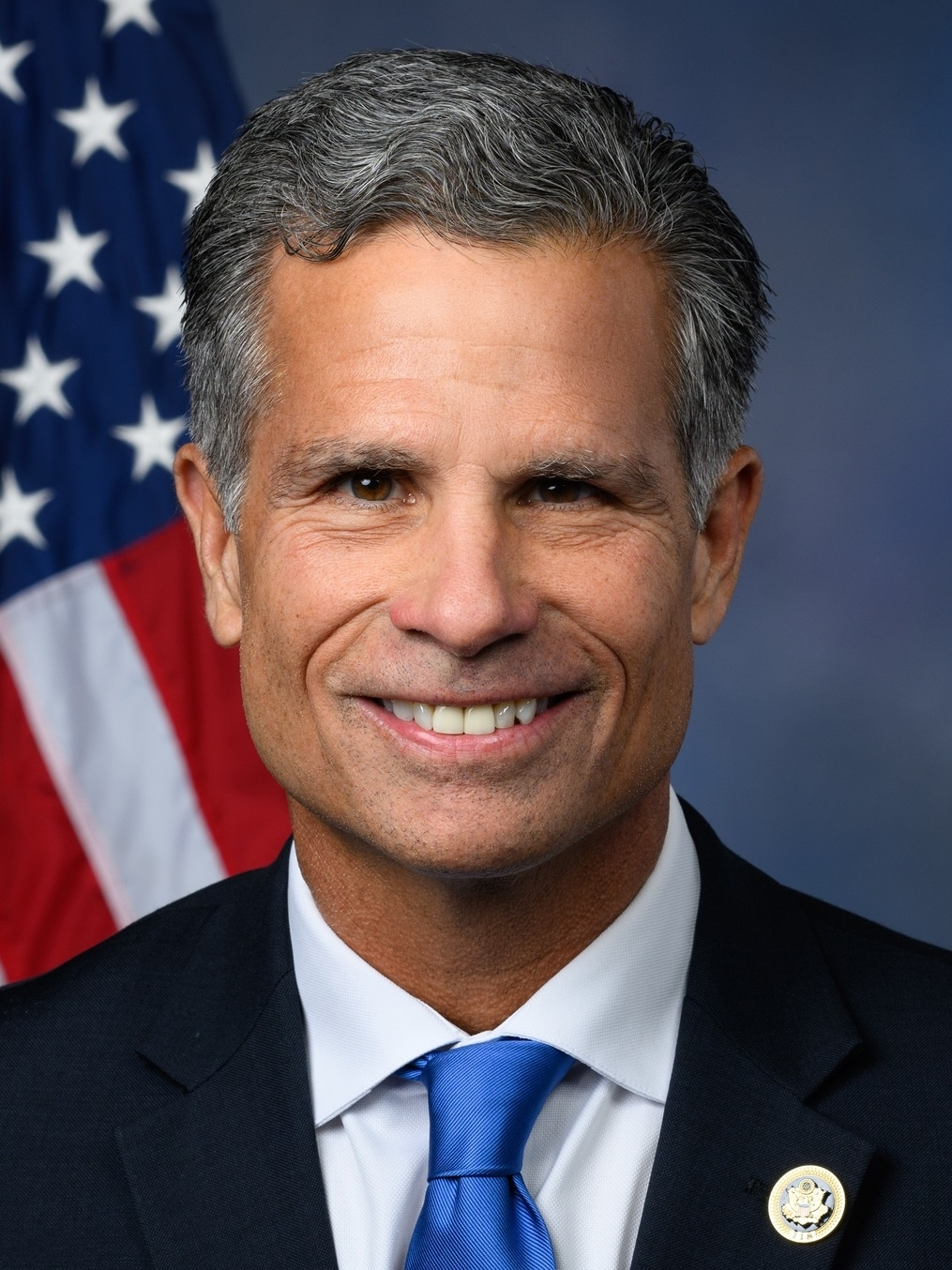

Nominee	Dan Meuser	Rachel Wallace
Party	Republican	Democratic
- County results Meuser: 50–60% 60–70%
Incumbent U.S. Representative
Dan Meuser
Republican

The 9th district is based in North Central Pennsylvania east of the Appalachian Divide. The 9th district includes Susquehanna, Bradford, Columbia, Lebanon, Montour, Northumberland, Schuylkill, Sullivan & Wyoming counties, as well as part of Berks, Luzerne, & Lycoming; this includes Williamsport, Bloomsburg and Lebanon. The incumbent is Republican Dan Meuser, who was re-elected with 70.5% of the vote in 2024.

=== Republican primary ===
==== Nominee ====
- Dan Meuser, incumbent U.S. representative

==== Endorsements ====
Dan Meuser

Executive branch officials

- Donald Trump, 45th and 47th president of the United States (2017–2021, 2025–present)

==== Fundraising ====
Campaign finance reports as of December 31, 2025
Candidate	Raised	Spent	Cash on hand
Dan Meuser (R)	$1,159,544	$1,129,901	$63,289
Source: Federal Election Commission

==== Results ====
Republican primary results
Party	Candidate	Votes	%
Republican	Dan Meuser (incumbent)	62,527	100.0
Total votes		62,527	100.0

=== Democratic primary ===
==== Nominee ====
- Rachel Wallace, former chief of staff in the Office of Management and Budget

==== Withdrawn ====
- Jenn Brothers, private investigator(running as an independent write-in candidate in the general election)
- Daniel Byron, retail manager (endorsed Wallace)

==== Endorsements ====
Rachel Wallace

Statewide officials

- Tim Holden, former member of the Pennsylvania Liquor Control Board (2013–2024), former chair (2015–2024), and former U.S. representative for PA-17 (1993–2013)
Jenn Brothers (withdrawn)

Organizations

- Center for Freethought Equality PAC
- Vote Common Good

==== Fundraising ====
Italics indicts a candidate who changed political parties.

Campaign finance reports as of December 31, 2025
Candidate	Raised	Spent	Cash on hand
Rachel Wallace (D)	$253,412	$46,525	$206,886
Jenn Brothers (D)	$7,691	$4,799	$2,892
Source: Federal Election Commission

==== Results ====
Democratic primary results
Party	Candidate	Votes	%
Democratic	Rachel Wallace	34,503	100.0
Total votes		34,503	100.0

=== General election ===
==== Predictions ====
Source	Ranking	As of
Decision Desk HQ	Safe R	July 14, 2026
The Cook Political Report	Solid R	September 11, 2025
Inside Elections	Solid R	September 11, 2025
Sabato's Crystal Ball	Safe R	April 10, 2025
Silver Bulletin	Solid R	August 20, 2026

==== Post-primary endorsements ====
Dan Meuser (R)

Organizations

- U.S. Chamber of Commerce
Rachel Wallace (D)

Statewide officials

- Josh Shapiro, governor of Pennsylvania (2023–present)

Labor unions

- National Education Association
- United Mine Workers of America COMPAC

State legislators

- Judy Schwank, SD-11 (2011–present)

Individuals

- James Carville, political consultant

==== Fundraising ====
Campaign finance reports as of September 30, 2026
Candidate	Raised	Spent	Cash on hand
Dan Meuser (R)	$2,122,719	$2,019,462	$136,904
Rachel Wallace (D)	$1,076,315	$687,488	$388,827
Source: Federal Election Commission

==== Debates ====
2026 Pennsylvania's 9th congressional district debate
No.	Date	Host	Moderator	Link	Republican	Democratic
Key: P Participant A Absent N Not invited I Invited W Withdrawn						
Key: P Participant A Absent N Not invited I Invited W Withdrawn					Meuser	Wallace
1	Oct. 20, 2026	Schuylkill County Chamber of Commerce	Bob Carl		I	I

==== Results ====
2026 Pennsylvania's 9th congressional district election
Party	Candidate	Votes	%	±%
Republican	Dan Meuser (incumbent)			
Democratic	Rachel Wallace			
Total votes				

== District 10 ==
2026 Pennsylvania's 10th congressional district election

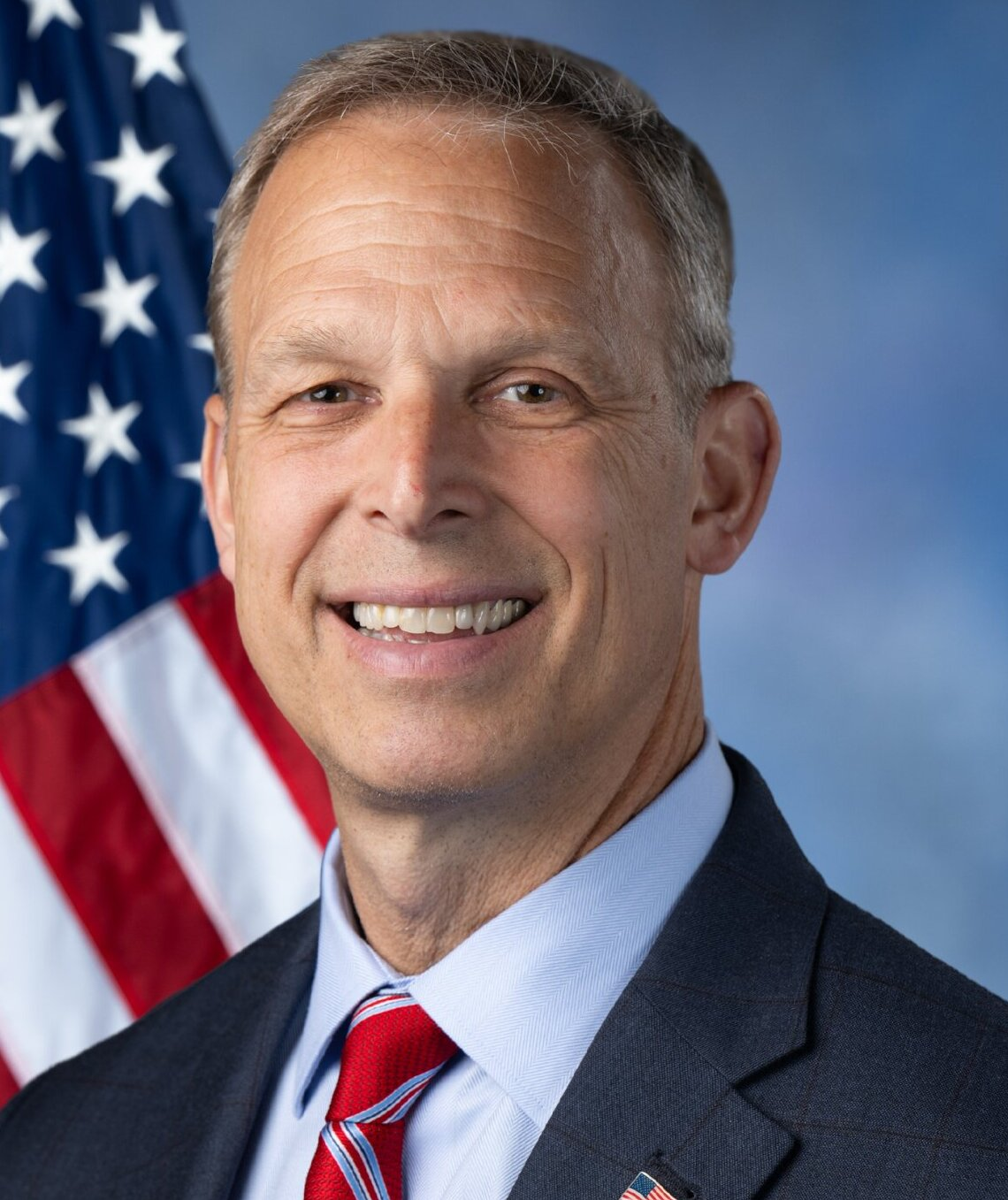
Nominee	Janelle Stelson	Scott Perry
Party	Democratic	Republican
Popular vote	173,671	141,731
Percentage	55.1%	44.9%
- County results Stelson: 50–60% 60–70% Perry: 50–60%
U.S. Representative before election
Scott Perry
Republican
Elected U.S. Representative
Janelle Stelson
Democratic

The 10th district is based in the Harrisburg and York areas, including all of Dauphin County, most of Cumberland County, and the northern half of York County. The incumbent is Republican Scott Perry, who was re-elected with 50.6% of the vote in 2024.

=== Republican primary ===
==== Nominee ====
- Scott Perry, incumbent U.S. representative

==== Endorsements ====
Scott Perry

Executive branch officials

- Donald Trump, president of the United States (2017–2021, 2025–present)

U.S. representatives

- Mike Johnson, speaker of the House of Representatives (2023–present) from LA-04 (2017–present)

Organizations

- Club for Growth PAC
- Freedom Caucus Fund
- Turning Point Action

==== Fundraising ====
Italics indicates a nonqualifying candidate.

Campaign finance reports as of December 31, 2025
Candidate	Raised	Spent	Cash on hand
Karen Lynn Dalton (R)	$11,120	$7,262	$3,857
Scott Perry (R)	$2,880,656	$1,300,085	$1,662,490
Source: Federal Election Commission

==== Results ====
Republican primary results
Party	Candidate	Votes	%
Republican	Scott Perry (incumbent)	45,900	100.0
Total votes		45,900	100.0

=== Democratic primary ===
==== Nominee ====
- Janelle Stelson, former WGAL news anchor and nominee for this district in 2024

==== Eliminated in primary ====
- Justin Douglas, Dauphin County commissioner (2023–present) (later endorsed Stelson)

==== Declined ====
- Robert Forbes, substitute teacher and candidate for this district in 2024

==== Endorsements ====
Justin Douglas

Organizations

- CASA in Action
- Vote Common Good
Janelle Stelson

U.S. representatives

- Barbara Comstock, former VA-10 (2015–2019) (Republican)
- Suzan DelBene, WA-01 (2012–present)
- Chris Deluzio, PA-17 (2023–present)
- Gabby Giffords, former AZ-08 (2007–2012)
- Denver Riggleman, former VA-05 (2019–2021) (Independent)
- Greg Stanton, AZ-04 (2019–present)

Statewide officials

- Austin Davis, lieutenant governor of Pennsylvania (2023–present)
- Josh Shapiro, governor of Pennsylvania (2023–present)

State legislators

- 1 state senator (Note: Patty Kim, SD-15 (2025–present))
- 3 state representatives (Note: Nate Davidson, HD-103 (2024–present); Carol Hill-Evans, HD-95 (2017–present); Dave Madsen, HD-104 (2023–present))

Party officials

- Matt Roan, chair of the Cumberland County Democratic Committee

Labor unions

- Pennsylvania Conference of Teamsters

Organizations

- DCCC Red to Blue
- Democratic Majority for Israel
- Elect Democratic Women
- EMILYs List
- Giffords
- Jewish Democratic Council of America
- NewDem Action Fund
- League of Conservation Voters
- WelcomePAC

==== Fundraising ====
Campaign finance reports as of December 31, 2025
Candidate	Raised	Spent	Cash on hand
Justin Douglas (D)	$84,901	$70,528	$14,372
Janelle Stelson (D)	$2,195,893	$690,423	$1,520,707
Source: Federal Election Commission

==== Results ====
Results by county: Stelson: 50–60%; 70–80%; 80–90%

Democratic primary results
Party	Candidate	Votes	%
Democratic	Janelle Stelson	42,397	67.4
Democratic	Justin Douglas	20,467	32.6
Total votes		62,864	100.0

=== Third parties and independents ===
==== Declared ====
- Isabelle Harman (Independent), publishing consultant (did not file)

=== General election ===
==== Predictions ====
Source	Ranking	As of
Decision Desk HQ	Lean D (flip)	August 7, 2026
The Cook Political Report	Lean D (flip)	October 9, 2026
Inside Elections	Tilt D (flip)	October 29, 2026
Sabato's Crystal Ball	Lean D (flip)	October 20, 2026
Silver Bulletin	Likely D (flip)	August 20, 2026

==== Post-primary endorsements ====
Janelle Stelson (D)

U.S. representatives

- Sarah Elfreth, MD-03 (2025–present)
- Jim Greenwood, former PA-08 (1993–2005) (Republican)
- Adam Kinzinger, former IL-16 (2011–2023) (Republican)

Labor unions

- National Education Association

Organizations

- Human Rights Campaign

==== Fundraising ====
Italics indicates a nonqualifying candidate.

Campaign finance reports as of October 14, 2026
Candidate	Raised	Spent	Cash on hand
Scott Perry (R)	$6,791,519	$5,849,869	$1,023,569
Janelle Stelson (D)	$9,234,260	$7,180,191	$2,069,306
Isabelle Harman (I)	$66,196	$57,804	$8,392
Source: Federal Election Commission

==== Debate ====
2026 Pennsylvania's 10th congressional district debate
No.	Date	Host	Moderator	Link	Republican	Democratic
Key: P Participant A Absent N Not invited I Invited W Withdrawn						
Key: P Participant A Absent N Not invited I Invited W Withdrawn					Perry	Stelson
1	Oct. 14, 2026	ABC27	Dennis Owens	ABC27	P	P

==== Polling ====
Poll source	Date(s) administered	Sample size	Margin of error	Scott Perry (R)	Janelle Stelson (D)	Other	Undecided
RedBox Research (D)	October 20-23, 2026	1,022 (LV)	± 3.9%	45%	48%	3% (Note: "Someone else" with 2%; "Prefer not to answer" with 1%)	4%
New York Times/The Philadelphia Inquirer/Siena University	October 16–22, 2026	400 (LV)	± 5.8%	48%	48%	0%	4%
Susquehanna Polling & Research (R)	October 5–11, 2026	300 (LV)	± 5.6%	46%	49%	1% (Note: "Other candidate" with 1%)	5%
Franklin & Marshall College	September 9–20, 2026	390 (RV)	± 5.7%	44%	47%	–	9%
	May 19, 2026	Primary elections					
Normington Petts (D) (Note: Poll sponsored by Stelson's campaign)	April 20–23, 2026	400 (RV)	± 4.9%	45%	51%	–	4%
Public Policy Polling (D) (Note: Poll sponsored by Republicans Against Perry)	November 18–19, 2025	549 (RV)	± 4.1%	44%	48%	–	8%
Public Policy Polling (D) (Note: Poll sponsored by House Majority PAC, which supports Stelson)	July 10–11, 2025	559 (V)	–	43%	46%	–	11%

==== Results ====
2026 Pennsylvania's 10th congressional district election
Party	Candidate	Votes	%	±%
Republican	Scott Perry (incumbent)			
Democratic	Janelle Stelson			
Total votes				

== District 11 ==
2026 Pennsylvania's 11th congressional district election
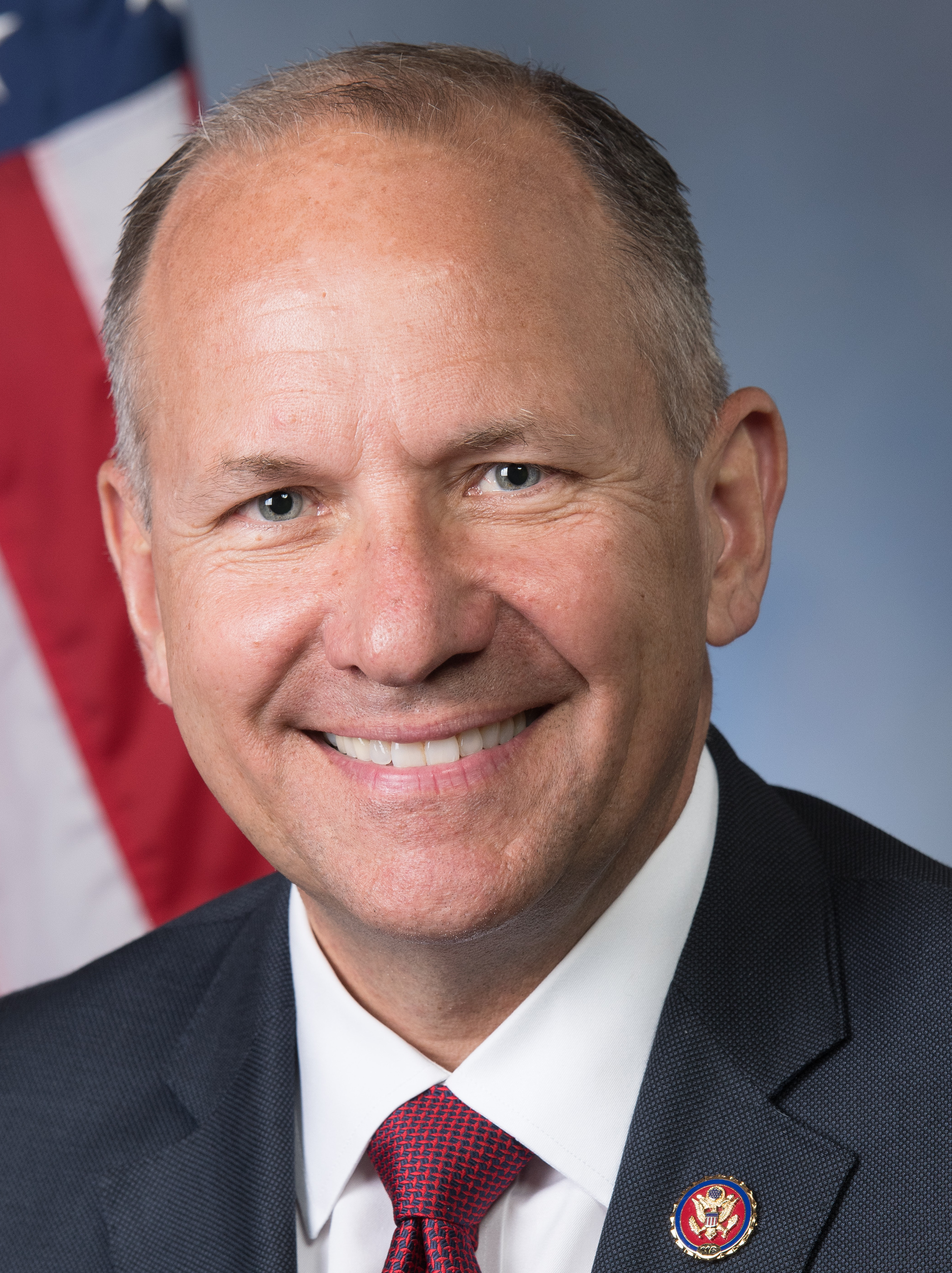

Nominee	Lloyd Smucker	Nancy Mannion
Party	Republican	Democratic
- County results Smucker: 50–60% 60–70%
Incumbent U.S. Representative
Lloyd Smucker
Republican

The 11th district is based in Pennsylvania Dutch Country, including all of Lancaster County and the southern half of York County. The incumbent is Republican Lloyd Smucker, who was re-elected with 62.9% of the vote in 2024.

=== Republican primary ===
==== Nominee ====
- Lloyd Smucker, incumbent U.S. representative (2017-present)

==== Endorsements ====
Lloyd Smucker

Executive branch officials

- Donald Trump, 45th and 47th president of the United States (2017–2021, 2025–present)

==== Fundraising ====
Campaign finance reports as of December 31, 2025
Candidate	Raised	Spent	Cash on hand
Lloyd Smucker (R)	$969,368	$778,941	$1,094,518
Source: Federal Election Commission

==== Results ====
Republican primary results
Party	Candidate	Votes	%
Republican	Lloyd Smucker (incumbent)	54,169	100.0
Total votes		54,169	100.0

=== Democratic primary ===
==== Nominee ====
- Nancy Mannion, registered nurse

==== Fundraising ====
Italics indicates a nonqualifying candidate.

Campaign finance reports as of December 31, 2025
Candidate	Raised	Spent	Cash on hand
Sarah Klimm (D)	$5,170	$4,975	$394
Nancy Mannion (D)	$88,619	$73,313	$15,305
Source: Federal Election Commission

==== Results ====
Democratic primary results
Party	Candidate	Votes	%
Democratic	Nancy Mannion	41,107	100.0
Total votes		41,107	100.0

=== General election ===
==== Predictions ====
Source	Ranking	As of
Decision Desk HQ	Likely R	October 30, 2026
The Cook Political Report	Solid R	September 11, 2025
Inside Elections	Solid R	September 11, 2025
Sabato's Crystal Ball	Safe R	April 10, 2025
Silver Bulletin	Solid R	August 20, 2026

==== Post-primary endorsements ====
Lloyd Smucker (R)

Organizations

- U.S. Chamber of Commerce
Nancy Mannion (D)

Labor unions

- National Education Association

Organizations

- National Women's Political Caucus

==== Fundraising ====
Campaign finance reports as of September 30, 2026
Candidate	Raised	Spent	Cash on hand
Lloyd Smucker (R)	$1,765,475	$2,060,744	$608,823
Nancy Mannion (D)	$304,500	$249,890	$54,611
Source: Federal Election Commission

==== Debate ====
2026 Pennsylvania's 10th congressional district debate
No.	Date	Host	Moderator	Link	Republican	Democratic
Key: P Participant A Absent N Not invited I Invited W Withdrawn						
Key: P Participant A Absent N Not invited I Invited W Withdrawn					Smucker	Mannion
1	Oct. 23, 2026	Lancaster Chamber & York County Economic Alliance	Heather Valudes & Kevin Schreiber	YouTube	P	P

==== Results ====
2026 Pennsylvania's 11th congressional district election
Party	Candidate	Votes	%	±%
Republican	Lloyd Smucker (incumbent)			
Democratic	Nancy Mannion			
Total votes				

== District 12 ==
2026 Pennsylvania's 12th congressional district election
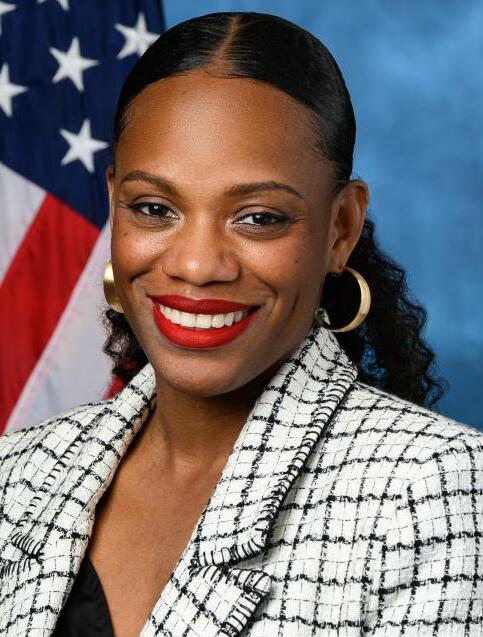

Nominee	Summer Lee	James Hayes
Party	Democratic	Republican
- County results Lee: 70–80% Hayes: 50–60%
Incumbent U.S. Representative
Summer Lee
Democratic

The 12th district is based in the city of Pittsburgh and its eastern and southern suburbs, including parts of Allegheny and Westmoreland counties. The incumbent is Democrat Summer Lee, who was re-elected with 56.4% of the vote in 2024.

=== Democratic primary ===
==== Nominee ====
- Summer Lee, incumbent U.S. representative

==== Eliminated in primary ====
- William Parker, app developer and perennial candidate

==== Withdrawn ====
- Adam Forgie, mayor of Turtle Creek

==== Declined ====
- Eugene DePasquale, former Pennsylvania Auditor General (2013–2021), nominee for the 10th district in 2020, and nominee for attorney general in 2024

==== Endorsements ====
Summer Lee

Labor Unions

- National Education Association

Organizations

- Peace Action
- End Citizens United
- League of Conservation Voters Action Fund
- Justice Democrats
- PAL PAC
- Planned Parenthood Action Fund
- Progressive Democrats of America
- Track AIPAC

Political parties

- Pennsylvania Working Families Party

==== Fundraising ====
Italics indicates a withdrawn candidate.

Campaign finance reports as of December 31, 2025
Candidate	Raised	Spent	Cash on hand
Adam Forgie (D)	$26,850	$14,666	$7,279
Summer Lee (D)	$1,134,453	$355,897	$1,790,134
Source: Federal Election Commission

==== Results ====
Results by county: Lee: 70–80%; 80–90%

Democratic primary results
Party	Candidate	Votes	%
Democratic	Summer Lee (incumbent)	75,298	81.2
Democratic	William Parker	17,437	18.8
Total votes		92,735	100.0

=== Republican primary ===
==== Nominee ====
- James Hayes, manufacturing executive and nominee for this district in 2024

==== Results ====
Republican primary results
Party	Candidate	Votes	%
Republican	James Hayes	23,760	100.0
Total votes		23,760	100.0

==== Fundraising ====
Italics indicates a nonqualifying candidate.

Campaign finance reports as of December 31, 2025
Candidate	Raised	Spent	Cash on hand
Benson Fechter (R)	$17,476	$10,671	$6,805
James Hayes (R)	$10,886	$3,384	$8,187
Source: Federal Election Commission

=== General election ===
==== Predictions ====
Source	Ranking	As of
Decision Desk HQ	Safe D	July 14, 2026
The Cook Political Report	Solid D	September 11, 2025
Inside Elections	Solid D	September 11, 2025
Sabato's Crystal Ball	Safe D	April 10, 2025
Silver Bulletin	Solid D	August 20, 2026

==== Fundraising ====
Campaign finance reports as of September 30, 2026
Candidate	Raised	Spent	Cash on hand
Summer Lee (D)	$1,590,182	$922,576	$1,679,185
James Hayes (R)	$64,891	$63,098	$2,478
Source: Federal Election Commission

==== Results ====
2026 Pennsylvania's 12th congressional district election
Party	Candidate	Votes	%	±%
Democratic	Summer Lee (incumbent)			
Republican	James Hayes			
Total votes				

== District 13 ==
2026 Pennsylvania's 13th congressional district election
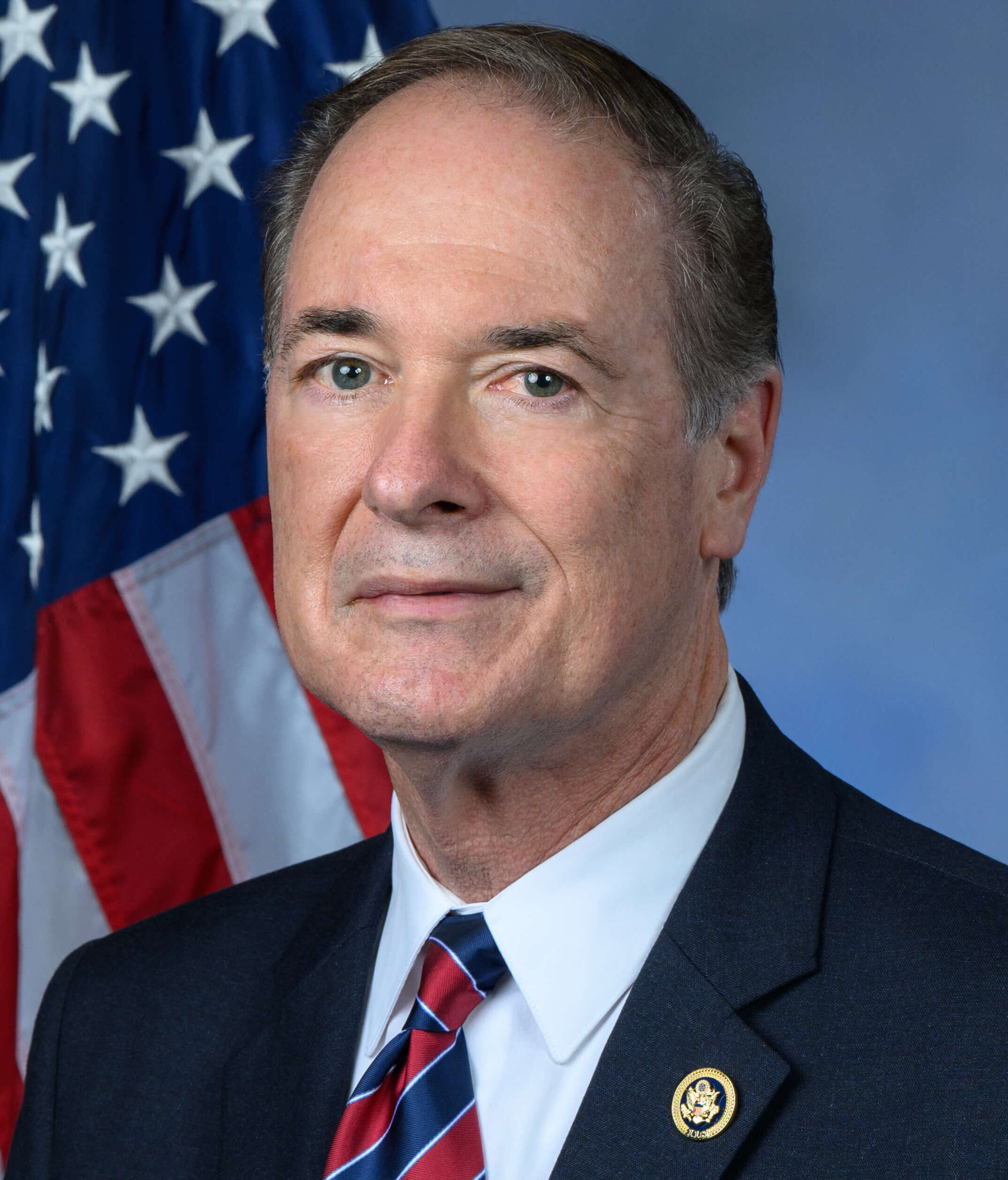

Nominee	John Joyce	Beth Farnham
Party	Republican	Democratic
Popular vote	189,919	91,726
Percentage	67.43%	32.57%
- County results Joyce: 60–70% 70–80% 80–90%
U.S. Representative before election
John Joyce
Republican
Elected U.S. Representative
John Joyce
Republican

The 13th district is based in rural South Central Pennsylvania, including Johnstown, Altoona, and Gettysburg. The incumbent is Republican John Joyce, who was re-elected with 74.2% of the vote in 2024.

=== Republican primary ===
==== Nominee ====
- John Joyce, incumbent U.S. representative

==== Endorsements ====
John Joyce

Executive branch officials

- Donald Trump, 45th and 47th president of the United States (2017–2021, 2025–present)

==== Fundraising ====
Campaign finance reports as of December 31, 2025
Candidate	Raised	Spent	Cash on hand
John Joyce (R)	$1,585,136	$879,483	$3,305,791
Source: Federal Election Commission

==== Results ====
Republican primary results
Party	Candidate	Votes	%
Republican	John Joyce (incumbent)	58,992	100.0
Total votes		58,992	100.0

=== Democratic primary ===
==== Nominee ====
- Beth Farnham, former Conewago Valley School District Board member and nominee for this district in 2024

==== Fundraising ====
Campaign finance reports as of December 31, 2025
Candidate	Raised	Spent	Cash on hand
Beth Farnham (D)	$14,861	$9,981	$5,640
Source: Federal Election Commission

==== Results ====
Democratic primary results
Party	Candidate	Votes	%
Democratic	Beth Farnham	32,428	100.0
Total votes		32,428	100.0

=== Independents ===
==== Declared ====
- Cody Thomas (did not file)

=== General election ===
==== Predictions ====
Source	Ranking	As of
Decision Desk HQ	Safe R	July 14, 2026
The Cook Political Report	Solid R	September 11, 2025
Inside Elections	Solid R	September 11, 2025
Sabato's Crystal Ball	Safe R	April 10, 2025
Silver Bulletin	Solid R	August 20, 2026

==== Post-primary endorsements ====
Beth Farnham (D)

Labor unions

- National Education Association

Organizations

- National Women's Political Caucus

==== Fundraising ====
Campaign finance reports as of September 30, 2026
Candidate	Raised	Spent	Cash on hand
John Joyce (R)	$2,726,969	$1,680,725	$3,646,382
Beth Farnham (D)	$101,192	$75,324	$26,629
Source: Federal Election Commission

==== Results ====
2026 Pennsylvania's 13th congressional district election
Party	Candidate	Votes	%	±%
Republican	John Joyce (incumbent)			
Democratic	Beth Farnham			
Total votes				

== District 14 ==
2026 Pennsylvania's 14th congressional district election
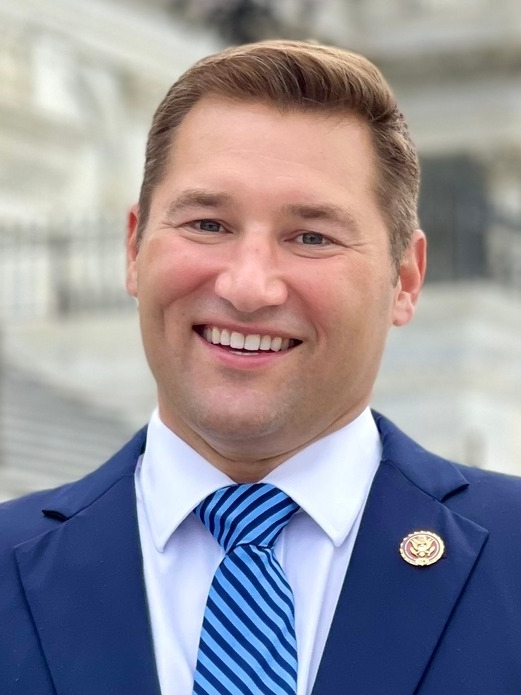

Nominee	Guy Reschenthaler	Alan Bradstock
Party	Republican	Democratic
Popular vote	159,216	117,701
Percentage	57.50%	42.50%
- County results Reschenthaler: 50–60% 60–70% 70–80%
U.S. Representative before election
Guy Reschenthaler
Republican
Elected U.S. Representative
Guy Reschenthaler
Republican

The 14th district is based in Southwest Pennsylvania, including all of Washington, Greene, and Fayette counties, most of Indiana and Somerset counties, and parts of Westmoreland County. The incumbent is Republican Guy Reschenthaler, who was re-elected with 66.6% of the vote in 2024.

=== Republican primary ===
==== Nominee ====
- Guy Reschenthaler, incumbent U.S. representative

=== Endorsements ===
Guy Reschenthaler

Executive branch officials

- Donald Trump, 45th and 47th president of the United States (2017–2021, 2025–present)

==== Fundraising ====
Campaign finance reports as of December 31, 2025
Candidate	Raised	Spent	Cash on hand
Guy Reschenthaler (R)	$2,615,688	$2,400,396	$764,371
Source: Federal Election Commission

==== Results ====
Republican primary results
Party	Candidate	Votes	%
Republican	Guy Reschenthaler (incumbent)	52,583	100.0
Total votes		52,583	100.0

=== Democratic primary ===
==== Nominee ====
- Alan Bradstock, retired FBI agent

==== Fundraising ====
Campaign finance reports as of December 31, 2025
Candidate	Raised	Spent	Cash on hand
Alan Bradstock (D)	$43,788	$13,319	$30,469
Source: Federal Election Commission

==== Results ====
Democratic primary results
Party	Candidate	Votes	%
Democratic	Alan Bradstock	48,774	100.0
Total votes		48,774	100.0

=== General election ===
==== Predictions ====
Source	Ranking	As of
Decision Desk HQ	Safe R	July 14, 2026
The Cook Political Report	Solid R	September 11, 2025
Inside Elections	Solid R	September 11, 2025
Sabato's Crystal Ball	Safe R	April 10, 2025

==== Post-primary endorsements ====
Alan Bradstock (D)

Labor unions

- National Education Association

==== Fundraising ====
Campaign finance reports as of September 30, 2026
Candidate	Raised	Spent	Cash on hand
Guy Reschenthaler (R)	$4,932,673	$4,740,750	$741,004
Alan Bradstock (D)	$370,028	$305,818	$64,210
Source: Federal Election Commission

==== Results ====
2026 Pennsylvania's 14th congressional district election
Party	Candidate	Votes	%	±%
Republican	Guy Reschenthaler (incumbent)			
Democratic	Alan Bradstock			
Total votes				

== District 15 ==
2026 Pennsylvania's 15th congressional district election
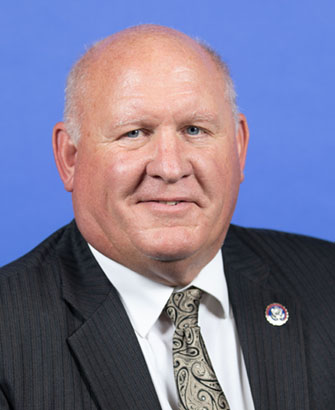

Nominee	Glenn Thompson	Ray Bilger
Party	Republican	Democratic
Popular vote	171,287	97,260
Percentage	63.78%	36.22%
- County results Thompson: 50–60% 60–70% 70–80% Bilger: 50–60%
U.S. Representative before election
Glenn Thompson
Republican
Elected U.S. Representative
Glenn Thompson
Republican

The 15th district is based in North Central Pennsylvania west of the Appalachian Divide, including State College, Lock Haven, and Bradford. The incumbent is Republican Glenn Thompson, who was re-elected with 71.5% of the vote in 2024.

=== Republican primary ===
==== Nominee ====
- Glenn Thompson, incumbent U.S. representative

==== Endorsements ====
Glenn Thompson

Executive branch officials

- Donald Trump, 45th and 47th president of the United States (2017–2021, 2025–present)

==== Fundraising ====
Campaign finance reports as of December 31, 2025
Candidate	Raised	Spent	Cash on hand
Glenn Thompson (R)	$1,227,440	$1,152,094	$867,140
Source: Federal Election Commission

==== Results ====
Republican primary results
Party	Candidate	Votes	%
Republican	Glenn Thompson (incumbent)	53,352	100.0
Total votes		53,352	100.0

=== Democratic primary ===
==== Nominee ====
- Ray Bilger, former intelligence officer

==== Results ====
Democratic primary results
Party	Candidate	Votes	%
Democratic	Ray Bilger	34,963	100.0
Total votes		34,963	100.0

=== General election ===
==== Predictions ====
Source	Ranking	As of
Decision Desk HQ	Safe R	July 14, 2026
The Cook Political Report	Solid R	September 11, 2025
Inside Elections	Solid R	September 11, 2025
Sabato's Crystal Ball	Safe R	April 10, 2025
Silver Bulletin	Solid R	August 20, 2026

==== Post-primary endorsements ====
Ray Bilger (D)

Labor unions

- National Education Association
Glenn Thompson (R)

Organizations

- U.S. Chamber of Commerce

==== Fundraising ====
Campaign finance reports as of September 30, 2026
Candidate	Raised	Spent	Cash on hand
Glenn Thompson (R)	$2,086,651	$2,156,996	$721,449
Ray Bilger (D)	$210,874	$106,422	$104,452
Source: Federal Election Commission

==== Results ====
2026 Pennsylvania's 15th congressional district election
Party	Candidate	Votes	%	±%
Republican	Glenn Thompson (incumbent)			
Democratic	Ray Bilger			
Total votes				

== District 16 ==
2026 Pennsylvania's 16th congressional district election
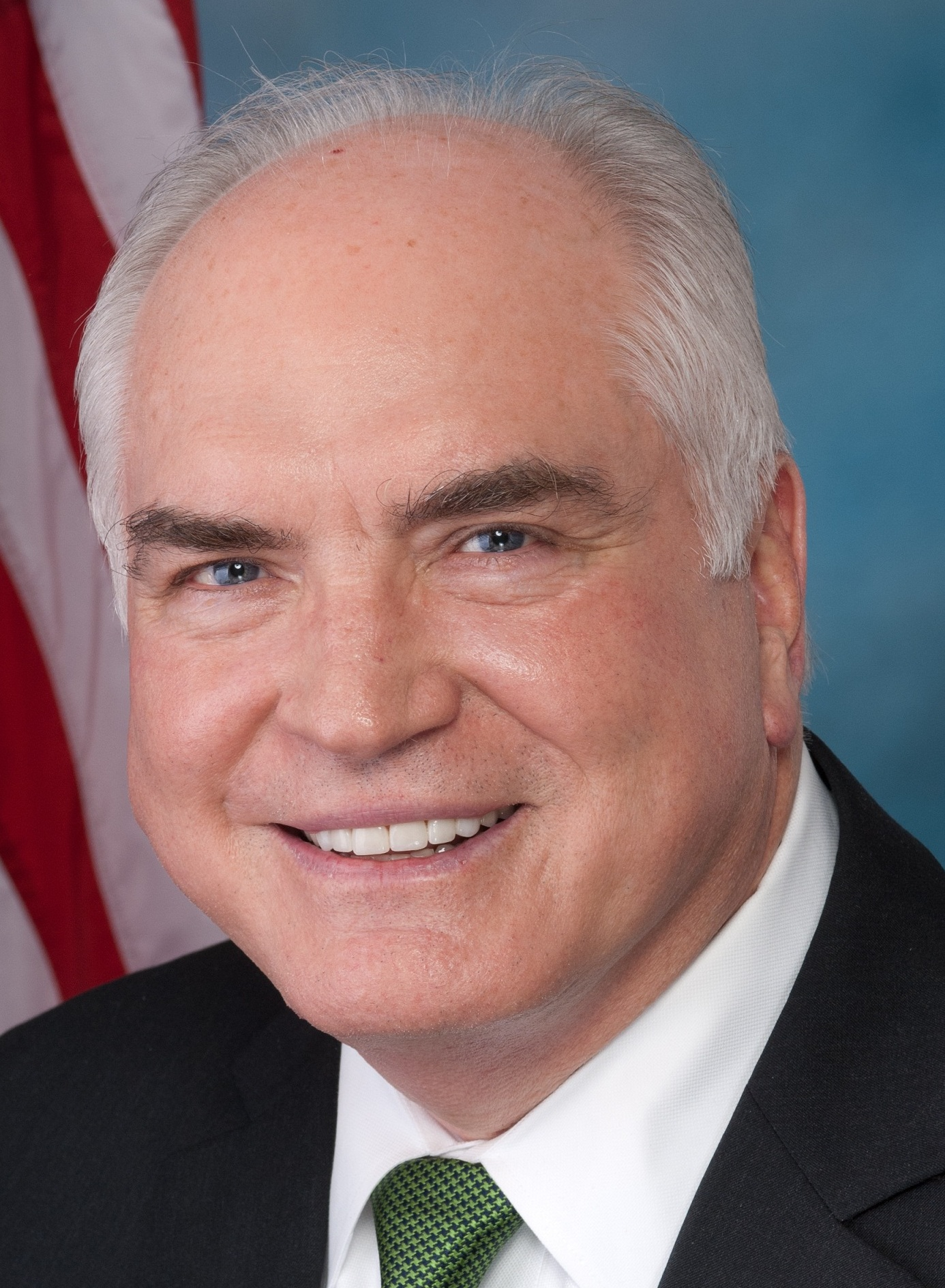

Nominee	Mike Kelly	Justin Wagner
Party	Republican	Democratic
- County results Kelly: 50–60% 60–70% Wagner: 50–60%
Incumbent U.S. Representative
Mike Kelly
Republican

The 16th district is located in Northwestern Pennsylvania, and contains all of Erie, Crawford, Mercer, Lawrence and Butler counties, and part of Venango County. The incumbent is Republican Mike Kelly, who was re-elected with 63.7% of the vote in 2024.

=== Republican primary ===
==== Nominee ====
- Mike Kelly, incumbent U.S. representative

==== Endorsements ====
Mike Kelly

Executive branch officials

- Donald Trump, 45th and 47th president of the United States (2017–2021, 2025–present)

==== Fundraising ====
Campaign finance reports as of December 31, 2025
Candidate	Raised	Spent	Cash on hand
Mike Kelly (R)	$668,937	$579,251	$1,132,373
Source: Federal Election Commission

==== Results ====
Republican primary results
Party	Candidate	Votes	%
Republican	Mike Kelly (incumbent)	44,236	100.0
Total votes		44,236	100.0

=== Democratic primary ===
==== Nominee ====
- Justin Wagner, engineer

==== Endorsements ====
Justin Wagner

Organizations

- Track AIPAC

==== Fundraising ====
Campaign finance reports as of December 31, 2025
Candidate	Raised	Spent	Cash on hand
Justin Wagner (D)	$3,842	$0	$3,842
Source: Federal Election Commission

==== Results ====
Democratic primary results
Party	Candidate	Votes	%
Democratic	Justin Wagner	49,371	100.0
Total votes		49,371	100.0

=== General election ===
==== Predictions ====
Source	Ranking	As of
Decision Desk HQ	Likely R	November 3, 2026
The Cook Political Report	Solid R	September 11, 2025
Inside Elections	Solid R	September 11, 2025
Sabato's Crystal Ball	Safe R	April 10, 2025
Silver Bulletin	Solid R	August 20, 2026

==== Post-primary endorsements ====
Mike Kelly (R)

Organizations

- U.S. Chamber of Commerce
Justin Wagner (D)

Labor unions

- National Education Association

==== Fundraising ====
Campaign finance reports as of September 30, 2026
Candidate	Raised	Spent	Cash on hand
Mike Kelly (R)	$1,400,290	$1,379,195	$1,063,783
Justin Wagner (D)	$222,606	$107,286	$120,320
Source: Federal Election Commission

==== Results ====
2026 Pennsylvania's 16th congressional district election
Party	Candidate	Votes	%	±%
Republican	Mike Kelly (incumbent)			
Democratic	Justin Wagner			
Total votes				

== District 17 ==
2026 Pennsylvania's 17th congressional district election
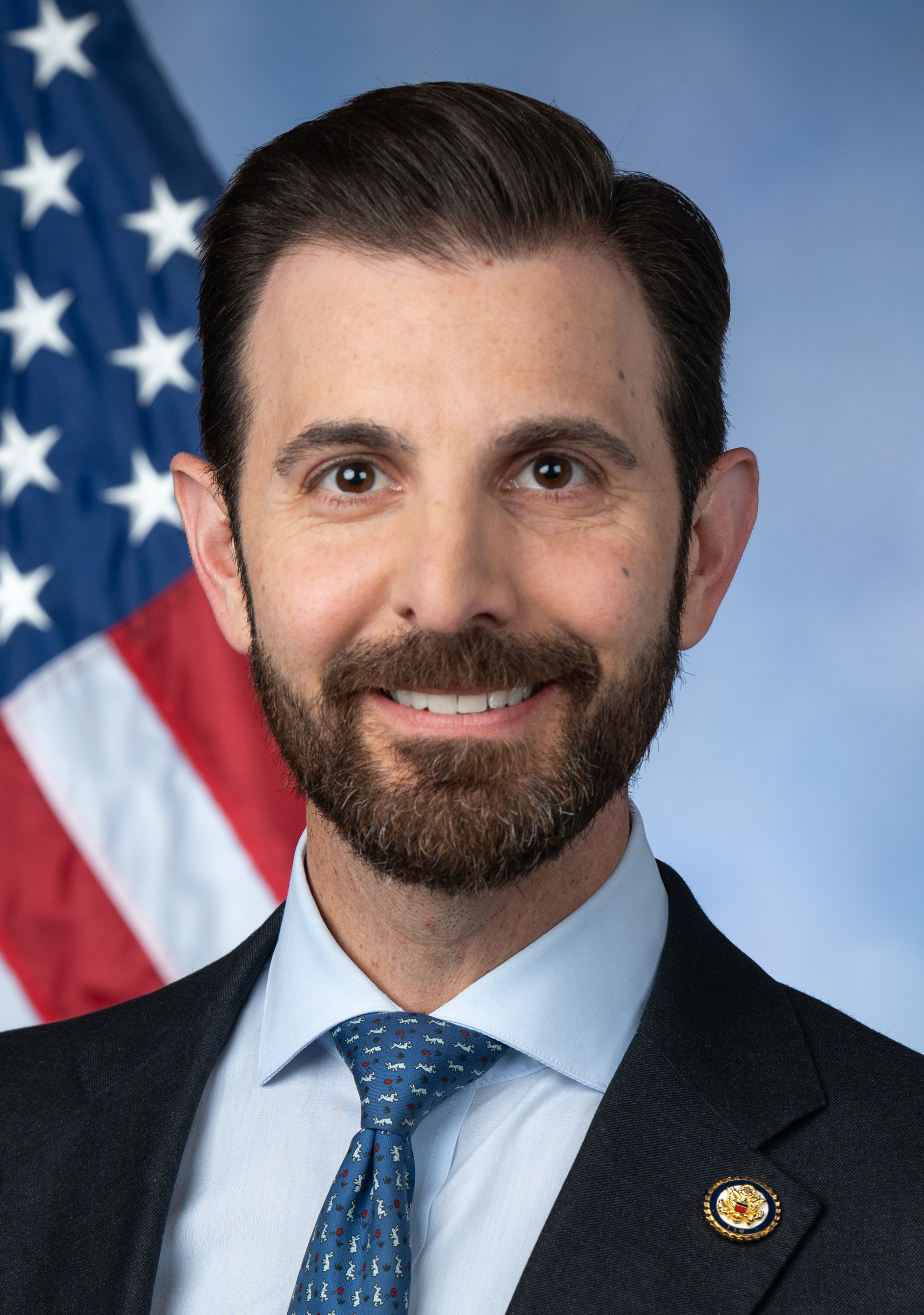

Nominee	Chris Deluzio	Tony Guy
Party	Democratic	Republican
- County results Deluzio: 60–70% Guy: 50–60%
Incumbent U.S. Representative
Chris Deluzio
Democratic

The 17th district is based in the northwestern suburbs and exurbs of Pittsburgh, including parts of Allegheny County and all of Beaver County. The incumbent is Democrat Chris Deluzio, who was re-elected with 53.9% of the vote in 2024.

=== Democratic primary ===
==== Nominee ====
- Chris Deluzio, incumbent U.S. representative

==== Withdrawn ====
- Alec Barlock

==== Endorsements ====
Chris Deluzio

Labor unions

- National Education Association

Organizations

- Center for Freethought Equality PAC
- End Citizens United
- Giffords
- J Street
- Planned Parenthood Action Fund

==== Fundraising ====
Campaign finance reports as of December 31, 2025
Candidate	Raised	Spent	Cash on hand
Chris Deluzio (D)	$1,587,843	$1,000,213	$941,301
Source: Federal Election Commission

==== Results ====
Democratic primary results
Party	Candidate	Votes	%
Democratic	Chris Deluzio (incumbent)	83,791	100.0
Total votes		83,791	100.0

=== Republican primary ===
==== Nominee ====
- Tony Guy, Beaver County Sheriff

==== Eliminated in primary ====
- Jesse James Vodvarka, manufacturer and perennial candidate

==== Results ====
Results by county: Guy: 80–90%; Vodvarka: 50–60%

Republican primary results
Party	Candidate	Votes	%
Republican	Tony Guy	19,581	53.3
Republican	Jesse James Vodvarka	17,183	46.7
Total votes		36,764	100.0

=== General election ===
==== Predictions ====
Source	Ranking	As of
Decision Desk HQ	Safe D	September 25, 2026
The Cook Political Report	Solid D	January 15, 2026
Inside Elections	Solid D	August 11, 2026
Sabato's Crystal Ball	Safe D	March 26, 2026
Silver Bulletin	Solid D	August 20, 2026

==== Post-primary endorsements ====
Chris Deluzio (D)

U.S. Senators

- Bernie Sanders, Vermont (2007–present) (Independent)

Political parties

- Working Families Party

==== Fundraising ====
Campaign finance reports as of September 30, 2026
Candidate	Raised	Spent	Cash on hand
Chris Deluzio (D)	$3,671,321	$2,721,071	$1,303,921
Tony Guy (R)	$207,598	$172,218	$35,380
Source: Federal Election Commission

==== Debates ====
2026 Pennsylvania's 17th congressional district debate
No.	Date	Host	Moderator	Link	Democratic	Republican
Key: P Participant A Absent N Not invited I Invited W Withdrawn						
Key: P Participant A Absent N Not invited I Invited W Withdrawn					Deluzio	Guy
1	Oct. 13, 2026	KDKA-TV	Ken Rice	YouTube	P	P

==== Results ====
2026 Pennsylvania's 17th congressional district election
Party	Candidate	Votes	%	±%
Democratic	Chris Deluzio (incumbent)			
Republican	Tony Guy			
Total votes				

== Notes ==
Partisan clients
