= Ryan Crosswell =

American attorney

Personal details
- Born: 1980 (age 45–46) Pottsville, Pennsylvania, U.S.
- Party: Democratic (2024–present); Republican (until 2024)
- Education: Vanderbilt University (BA); Duke University (MA, JD)
- Occupation: Attorney

Ryan Crosswell (born 1980) is an American attorney. He served as a prosecutor for the U.S. Justice Department in Louisiana and California and then became a trial attorney in the Public Integrity Section in Washington, D.C. He resigned in February 2025 after Acting Deputy Attorney General Emil Bove ordered federal prosecutors to dismiss the case against New York mayor Eric Adams.

In his resignation letter, which was published in the Washington Post, Crosswell said he left because it was improper for Bove to pressure attorneys in the public integrity unit to sign a motion that Bove had acknowledged “was not based on the facts or the law.”

Crosswell testified about his resignation before a panel of Democratic members of the House and Senate judiciary committees. He told the panel, “The public integrity section has protected the American people against abuses of power for nearly 50 years, but it was nearly eliminated in an hour.”

In June 2025, Crosswell announced his candidacy for the U.S. House of Representatives in the 7th District of Pennsylvania. He came in 2nd in the Democratic primary in May 2026.

== Early life and education ==
Crosswell grew up in Pottsville, Pennsylvania. He is the son of Deborah and Robert Crosswell, who was the owner of a Coca-Cola bottling company.

He attended Pottsville Area High School and was a member of the wrestling and cross country teams. He graduated in 1999 and attended Vanderbilt University, where he majored in secondary education and history. He graduated from Vanderbilt in 2003.

Crosswell enrolled at Duke University to earn a Juris Doctor degree and a master's degree in history. He also enrolled at the United States Marine Corps Officer Candidate School in Quantico, Virginia, where he attended Basic School and received combat training. He has said he was motivated to join the Marines because of the Sep 11 attacks.

In 2007, he graduated from Duke with a Juris Doctor degree and a master's degree in history. He later joined the Marine Corps Reserve and served as a lieutenant colonel.

== Law career ==
After law school, Crosswell joined the Charlotte, N.C. office of Littler Mendelson, a firm that specializes in labor and employment law. He then became an assistant U.S. attorney for the Justice Department, working in offices in Baton Rouge, Louisiana and San Diego, California, before joining the Public Integrity Section in Washington, D.C.

As an attorney for the Justice Department, he prosecuted 374 criminal cases involving bribery, fraud, campaign finance, drug trafficking and immigration. They included cases involving the former governor of Puerto Rico, who was charged with bribery, and a New Mexico political candidate who was convicted of a shooting spree targeting elected officials and a subsequent plot to murder witnesses to prevent their testimony at trial.

After he resigned from the Justice Department, he joined Singleton Schreiber, a San Diego-based firm that practices injury law against organizations.

== Resignation from Justice Department ==
On February 10, 2025, Emil Bove, then the acting deputy attorney general, dismissed federal corruption charges against New York mayor Eric Adams, saying that the indictment interfered with the New York City Democratic mayoral primary. The move to dismiss the case led to several resignations.

Crosswell, who was not involved in the case, resigned on February 17. He said in his resignation letter that Bove pressured the remaining public corruption attorneys to sign a motion to end the case and threatened to fire them if they would not help end the Adams case. The Washington Post published his letter on March 6.

On April 7, Crosswell testified at a congressional hearing of Democratic members of the House and Senate judiciary committees. He said the department's decision to drop the corruption case had a devastating impact. “The public integrity section has protected the American people against abuses of power for nearly 50 years, but it was nearly eliminated in an hour,” he said.

== Political activity ==
After Crosswell resigned from the Justice Department, he moved from Washington, D.C., to Allentown.

In June 2025, Crosswell, announced he was running as a Democrat in Pennsylvania's 7th Congressional District, which was held by Republican Ryan Mackenzie. Crosswell was one of seven Democrats competing for the party's nomination in the May 19, 2026, primary election, and finished 2nd in that primary behind Bob Brooks.
