= Sean P. Kilkenny =

American politician, attorney, and retired U.S. Army officer

Sheriff of Montgomery County, Pennsylvania
- Incumbent
- Assumed office 2015

Personal details
- Born: June 28, 1973 (age 52) Jenkintown, Pennsylvania, U.S.
- Party: Democratic
- Education: Villanova University (BA); Temple University (JD); University of South Carolina (MPA); U.S. Army War College (MA)
- Occupation: Attorney

Military service
- Allegiance: United States
- Branch/service: United States Army
- Years of service: 1995–2018
- Rank: Lieutenant colonel

Sean Patrick Kilkenny (born June 28, 1973) is an American politician, attorney, and retired U.S. Army officer. He is the sheriff of Montgomery County, Pennsylvania, and is the founder and managing partner of Kilkenny Law.

== Early life and education ==
Kilkenny was born on June 28, 1973, in Jenkintown, Pennsylvania. His father was a U.S. Army veteran and his mother was a public school teacher.

He completed his bachelor of arts in history and political science from Villanova University in 1995, followed by a Juris Doctor from Temple University School of Law in 1998, master of public administration from the University of South Carolina in 2001, and later a master of arts in strategic studies from the United States Army War College in 2016.

== Career ==
=== Military service ===
In 1995, Kilkenny began his military career as a paratrooper and later as federal prosecutor in the U.S. Army Judge Advocate General Corps, serving both on active duty and in the Army Reserve. He held assignments in Iraq, Bosnia, Kosovo, and South Korea, and retired as a lieutenant colonel in 2018 after more than 20 years of service. His roles included providing legal oversight and operational support in international deployments.

=== Legal career ===
He established Kilkenny Law in 2015, and since then, he has been serving as the managing partner of the law firm, providing counsel on real estate, zoning, and municipal law. His legal practice extends to serving as a solicitor for different townships, boroughs, and school districts in the Philadelphia area. Recognized for his professional activities, Kilkenny has been named among Pennsylvania Super Lawyers every year since 2020. He has also admitted to practice before the U.S. Supreme Court and other states and federal courts.

=== Sheriff of the Montgomery County ===
Associated with the Democratic Party, Kilkenny was elected Sheriff of Montgomery County in 2015 and re-elected in 2019 and 2023. As a sheriff, he oversees courthouse security, prisoner transport, and warrant enforcement. He introduced body cameras for deputies, modernized sheriff’s sales by moving them online, and increased diversity within the sheriff’s office workforce. Kilkenny received the Patriotic Award from the Pennsylvania Employer Support of the Guard and Reserve in 2021 for supporting fellow U.S. Army veterans as the sheriff of Montgomery County.

In 2023, Kilkenny became the president of the Pennsylvania Sheriff's Association (PSA), advocating for expanded investigatory authorities for deputies and legislative reforms to develop law enforcement operations. He is the third sheriff from Montgomery County to hold this position in the PSA’s history.

Kilkenny has been serving on the Montgomery County Community College Board of Trustees since 2013. In 2017, he created a scholarship program to support educational development for county employees and sheriff’s deputies. His initiatives also include partnerships with Penn State Abington in 2023 to provide four-year degree programs for county workers.

== Personal life ==
Kilkenny resides in Jenkintown with his wife, Betsy, and their two daughters.
