= Mike Fitzpatrick =

American attorney and politician (1963–2020)

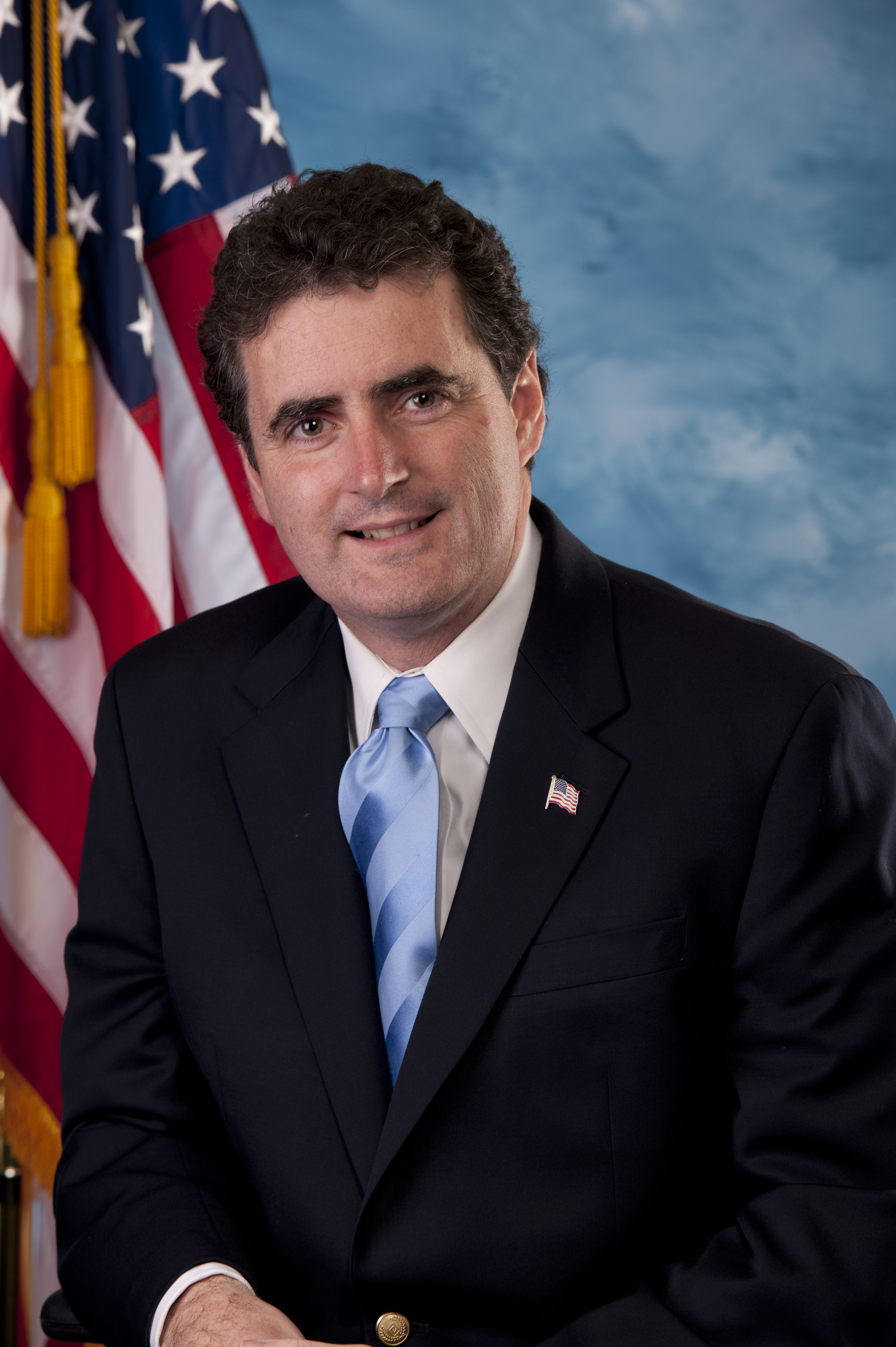
- Official portrait, 2013

Member of the U.S. House of Representatives from Pennsylvania's 8th district
- In office January 3, 2011 – January 3, 2017
- Preceded by: Patrick Murphy
- Succeeded by: Brian Fitzpatrick
- In office January 3, 2005 – January 3, 2007
- Preceded by: Jim Greenwood
- Succeeded by: Patrick Murphy

Member of the Bucks County Board of Commissioners
- In office January 17, 1995 – January 3, 2005
- Preceded by: Mark Schweiker
- Succeeded by: Jim Cawley

Personal details
- Born: Michael Gerard Fitzpatrick; June 28, 1963 Philadelphia, Pennsylvania, U.S.
- Died: January 6, 2020 (aged 56) Levittown, Pennsylvania, U.S.
- Resting place: Washington Crossing National Cemetery; Newtown, Pennsylvania
- Party: Republican
- Spouse: Kathleen Gestite
- Children: 6
- Relatives: Brian Fitzpatrick (brother)
- Education: St. Thomas University (BA); Dickinson School of Law (JD)
- Occupation: Attorney

Michael Gerard Fitzpatrick (June 28, 1963 – January 6, 2020) was an American attorney and politician who served as a Republican member of the United States House of Representatives, representing Pennsylvania's 8th congressional district from 2005 to 2007 and 2011 to 2017. He was first elected to Congress in 2004 and represented the district from 2005 to 2007, but he was defeated by Democrat Patrick Murphy in 2006.

He declined to run for his old seat in 2008 but ran again in 2010, and won a rematch with Murphy. He was re-elected in 2012 and 2014. A supporter of term limits, he did not seek re-election in 2016 and was replaced by his brother Brian. He was considered a moderate Republican, and consistently ranked among the most bipartisan members of Congress.

== Early life, education and law career ==
Fitzpatrick was born in Philadelphia and raised in Bucks County. He graduated from Bishop Egan High School, now Conwell-Egan Catholic High School, in Fairless Hills. He moved to Florida to attend St. Thomas University with an academic scholarship where he earned his bachelor's degree in 1985 from the school's honors program. He earned his J.D. degree from the Dickinson School of Law at Penn State University. He was named business manager of the Dickinson Journal of International Law. After graduating law school in 1988, Fitzpatrick was admitted to the practice of law in Pennsylvania and New Jersey.

== Bucks County Commission (1995–2005) ==
In January 1995, Fitzpatrick was appointed to the Bucks County Board of Commissioners by an 11-member panel of county judges. The appointment was made to fill the unexpired term of Mark Schweiker, who had been elected lieutenant governor. Fitzpatrick, who was an attorney at a firm active in county affairs, was the candidate preferred by county Republican Party leaders.

The appointment was not without controversy, however, as some claimed the judges had acted solely on the recommendation of the county Republican Party. As Commissioner, Fitzpatrick oversaw social agencies, coordinated the response of local governments to emergencies, preserved open space, and responded to regional issues. Fitzpatrick supported a $7 million information-technology project to upgrade the county's communication and outreach abilities in light of the Information Age.

== U.S. House of Representatives (2005–2007) ==
=== Elections ===
2004

In July 2004, popular moderate Republican James C. Greenwood of Pennsylvania's 8th congressional district unexpectedly withdrew from his re-election campaign. In the party convention held to select Greenwood's replacement on the ballot, the more conservative Fitzpatrick won the nomination over Greenwood's choice, state Senator Joe Conti, thanks to the backing of Bucks County Republican Party boss Harry Fawkes. Fitzpatrick went on to face liberal activist Virginia Schrader in the general election. Fitzpatrick won the general election against Schrader 55%–44%, with the remaining vote split between two minor candidates. The district included all of Bucks County, a sliver of Montgomery County, and parts of two wards in Northeast Philadelphia.

2006

Fitzpatrick faced Democrat Patrick Murphy in the November general election of 2006. In January 2006, Fitzpatrick said he had donated to charity the $21,500 he received from political action committees headed by U.S. Representatives Bob Ney (R-OH), Tom DeLay, (R-TX), and Randy "Duke" Cunningham (R-CA). Fitzpatrick was endorsed by several environmental groups including the Sierra Club. He was the only incumbent Republican congressman in Pennsylvania who had the support of the environmentalist lobby during this election. The Cook Political Report rated the race as "Leans Republican". However, Congressional Quarterly pegged the contest as a "Toss-up". A poll released at the end of October showed Fitzpatrick trailing Murphy by three percentage points.

In the end, the election was decided by less than one percentage point, with Fitzpatrick initially trailing by just over 1,500 votes out of nearly 250,000 cast. On November 8, with all precincts reporting, Murphy led by 1,521 votes. Philadelphia television station NBC 10 later reported that Fitzpatrick had conceded the election to Murphy. He along with Mike Sodrel (R-IN) and Joe Schwarz (R-MI) were the only freshman Republicans to be defeated in 2006 (Schwarz in the primary).

== Tenure ==
In May 2006, Fitzpatrick introduced the Deleting Online Predators Act of 2006, which requires most schools and libraries to actively restrict minors from access to "Commercial Social Networking Websites" and "Chat Rooms". In late July, the "DOPA Act" overwhelmingly passed the House. Speaking before the vote was taken, Fitzpatrick said, "The social networking sites have become, in a sense, a happy hunting ground for child predators".

== Committee assignments ==
Fitzpatrick served on the United States House Committee on Financial Services and the United States House Committee on Small Business.

== Inter-congressional career (2007–2011) ==
After the loss to Murphy, Fitzpatrick re-entered the practice of law, taking a position with Middletown Township law firm—and major Republican Party contributor—Begley, Carlin, and Mandio. In the fall of 2007, the Bucks County Commissioners asked Fitzpatrick, along with former Commissioner Andy Warren and former Common Pleas Judge William Hart Rufe to co-chair an effort to pass a ballot initiative authorizing the county to borrow $87 million for open space preservation. The initiative, which was also endorsed by Congressman Murphy, passed by a large margin.

2008

Throughout 2007, there was much speculation that Fitzpatrick would seek to reclaim the seat in Congress that he lost to Murphy. Fitzpatrick laid the rumors to rest in January 2008 by announcing that he would not be running for Congress, but instead would challenge freshman State Representative Chris King in the 142nd District. Despite charges by some Democrats that he was "afraid to run against Murphy because he knows he would lose", Fitzpatrick claimed that he was interested in the job because of his "passion ... in solving local problems and serving the local community", as well as a desire to "change the way business is done in Harrisburg." However, a cancer diagnosis forced Fitzpatrick to end his bid for the State House in early February. Fitzpatrick yielded his spot on the ballot to Republican activist Frank Farry (who went on to win the seat), and supported Doylestown pharmaceutical company executive Thomas Manion for the congressional seat he once held.

== U.S. House of Representatives (2011–2017) ==
=== Elections ===
2010

On January 23, 2010, Fitzpatrick announced he would once again run for his old seat in the House of Representatives. He pledged that if elected, he would only serve for a maximum of three more terms, for a total of four terms. He described Washington, D.C. as "a town of embedded politicians" with a seniority system that "rewards congressmen for political careers lasting decades and encourages members to serve in perpetuity." He called for "real reform of house rules and procedures" and "congressional term limits."

Fitzpatrick won the Republican nomination with 77% of the vote in the May primary. A Franklin and Marshall poll taken in mid-September 2010 suggested the race was leaning towards Fitzpatrick at that time. On November 2, Fitzpatrick defeated Murphy and was elected the Congressman for the 8th district. On November 2, 2010, Fitzpatrick defeated Murphy by 53.5% to 46.5% to reclaim his old seat. He was sworn in on January 5, 2011, and has joined the Republican Main Street Partnership.

2012

Fitzpatrick defeated Kathy Boockvar 57%–43%.

2014

Before the election, Fitzpatrick reiterated a pledge he made in 2010 that this will be his last re-election bid, due to self-imposed term limits. In the Democratic primary, former Army Ranger Kevin Strouse defeated businesswoman Shaughnessy Naughton. Fitzpatrick defeated Strouse in the general election. After he won, he again confirmed that he would not run for re-election in 2016. Fitzpatrick's younger brother, Brian, a lawyer and former FBI supervisory special agent in California, moved back to Pennsylvania to run for his brother's seat. Brian Fitzpatrick won the election on November 8, 2016.

== Tenure ==
On January 5, 2011, Fitzpatrick failed to attend the swearing-in ceremony for members and attempted to take the oath-of-office remotely at a reception. However, House rules require that the oath be taken within proximity of the Speaker. The oath was administered the following day, but two votes that he cast prior to taking the oath were nullified according to the Constitution. Some activists contended the reception was a fundraiser and called for an investigation by the House Ethics Committee. A spokesperson for Fitzpatrick denied the event was a fundraiser and asserted that donations made went to cover the cost of campaign-provided buses to Washington.

Fitzpatrick supported reauthorization of the Violence Against Women Act. On January 5, 2016, the House Committee on Financial Services reauthorized the Task Force to Investigate Terrorism Financing with Fitzpatrick as Chairman and Stephen Lynch (D-MA) as Ranking Member. Over the course of a two-year period, the Task Force investigated the financial mechanisms used to fund terrorist activities, specifically the vulnerabilities of the global financial system, trade-based money laundering, assistance for developing world, and the sale and trafficking of illicit goods.

Since December 2014, Fitzpatrick has been a leading voice in Congress on medical device safety. He has pressed the FDA after dangerous medical devices remained in use after causing serious injury and death. On June 8, 2016, Fitzpatrick and Representative Louise Slaughter (D-NY) introduced two bills to reform the medical device review and approval process. The first bill, Ariel Grace's Law, would allow victims of dangerous medical devices to seek legal recourse. The second bill, the Medical Device Guardians Act, would require physicians to identify and report unsafe medical devices and would protect them from having their reports used against them in a civil court.

Fitzpatrick was ranked as the 10th most bipartisan member of the U.S. House of Representatives during the 114th United States Congress (and the most bipartisan member of the U.S. House of Representatives from Pennsylvania) in the Bipartisan Index created by The Lugar Center and the McCourt School of Public Policy that ranks members of the United States Congress by their degree of bipartisanship (by measuring the frequency each member's bills attract co-sponsors from the opposite party and each member's co-sponsorship of bills by members of the opposite party).

=== Committee assignments ===
- Committee on Financial Services
  - Subcommittee on Capital Markets and Government-Sponsored Enterprises
  - Subcommittee on Oversight and Investigations (Vice Chair)
  - Task Force to Investigate Terrorism Financing (Chair)

== Personal life and death ==
Fitzpatrick and his wife Kathleen, a high school science teacher, lived in Levittown, Pennsylvania, with their six children. He was affiliated with the Washington Crossing Council of the Boy Scouts of America and was a member of the Temple Lower Bucks Hospital Board of Directors, the Conwell-Egan Catholic Board of Advisors, the Knights of Columbus, the Levittown Bristol Kiwanis Club, the Ancient Order of Hibernians and the Brehon Law Society. He was an Eagle Scout from the Bucks County Council and former president of that council, and was honored with the Silver Beaver Award for his services to Scouting. Fitzpatrick was diagnosed with colon cancer in June 2008. He reported five months later that the cancer went into remission after chemotherapy. Fitzpatrick died from melanoma at his home in Levittown on January 6, 2020, at age 56.

== Sources ==
- "Michael G. Fitzpatrick Biography". fitzpatrick.house.gov. Archived from the original on 2006-08-31.

U.S. House of Representatives
Preceded by Jim Greenwood	Member of the U.S. House of Representatives from Pennsylvania's 8th congressional district 2005–2007	Succeeded by Patrick Murphy
Preceded by Patrick Murphy	Member of the U.S. House of Representatives from Pennsylvania's 8th congressional district 2011–2017	Succeeded by Brian Fitzpatrick
Political offices
Preceded by Mark Schweiker	Member of the Bucks County Board of Commissioners; 1995–2005	Succeeded by Jim Cawley
