= Bob Harvie (politician) =

American politician

- Harvie in 2026

Member-elect of the U.S. House of Representatives from Pennsylvania's 1st district
- Assuming office January 3, 2027
- Succeeding: Brian Fitzpatrick

Member of the Bucks County Board of Commissioners
- Incumbent
- Assumed office January 6, 2020

Personal details
- Born: Robert Harvie Jr. 1971 or 1972 (age 54–55) Bristol, Pennsylvania, U.S.
- Party: Democratic
- Education: George Washington University (BA); Holy Family University (MEd)

Robert J. Harvie Jr. (born 1970/1971) is an American politician and former teacher who is the United States representative-elect from Pennsylvania's 1st congressional district. Since 2020, he has served on the Bucks County Board of Commissioners, and is serving as the current Vice-Chair as of 2026. He was the Democratic nominee for the 2026 U.S. House of Representatives election in Pennsylvania's 1st congressional district, defeating incumbent representative Brian Fitzpatrick, a Republican.

== Education and career ==
Harvie attended George Washington University, graduating magna cum laude with a bachelor's degree in history. He also has a master's degree in education from Holy Family University.

Harvie has had a 20 year career as a social studies teacher and chairman of the Social Studies Department at Bucks County Technical High School.

== Congressional campaign ==
On April 3, 2025, Harvie announced he was running for Pennsylvania's 1st congressional district in the 2026 general election.

On May 20, 2026, Harvie defeated Lucia Simonelli to win the Democratic primary.

On November 3, 2026, Harvie defeated incumbent representative Brian Fitzpatrick. He will be the first Democrat to represent Bucks County since Patrick Murphy served as Congressman in the 111th United States Congress.

U.S. House of Representatives
| Preceded by Brian Fitzpatrick | Member of the U.S. House of Representatives from Pennsylvania's 1st congressional district Taking office 2027 | Elect |
