= Brian Fitzpatrick (American politician) =

American politician (born 1973)

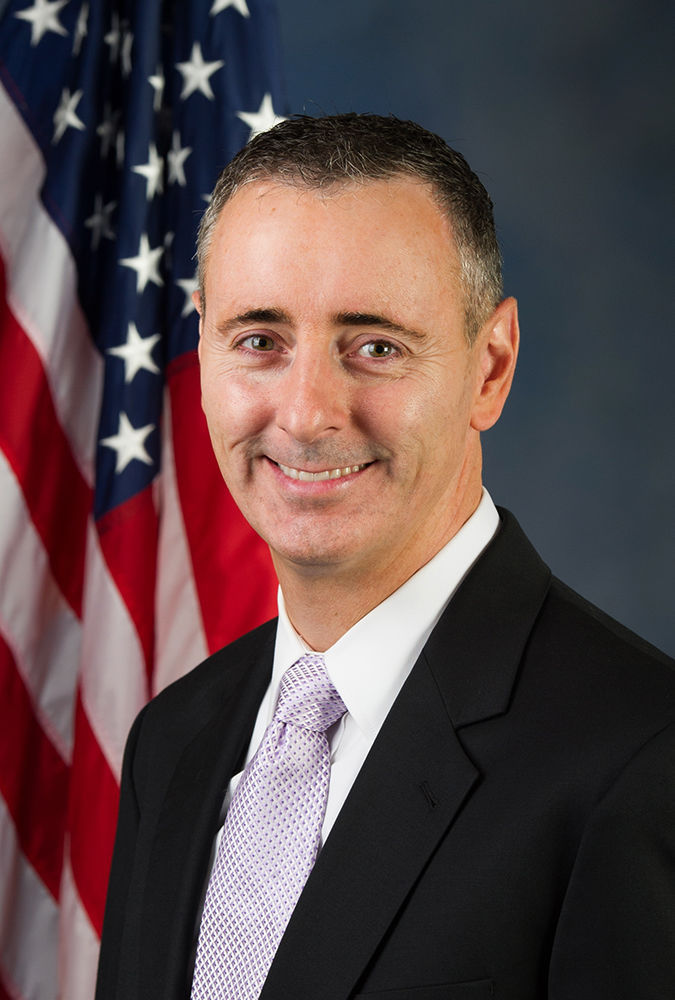
- Official portrait, 2017

Member of the U.S. House of Representatives from Pennsylvania
- Incumbent
- Assumed office January 3, 2017
- Preceded by: Mike Fitzpatrick
- Constituency: 8th district (2017–2019); 1st district (2019–present)

Personal details
- Born: Brian Kevin Fitzpatrick; December 17, 1973 (age 52) Philadelphia, Pennsylvania, U.S.
- Party: Republican
- Spouse: Jacqui Heinrich (m. 2026)
- Relatives: Mike Fitzpatrick (brother)
- Education: La Salle University (BS); Pennsylvania State University (MBA, JD)
- Website: House website Campaign website
- Fitzpatrick's voice Fitzpatrick supporting Ukraine against Russia following the Russian invasion of Ukraine. Recorded February 9, 2022

Brian Kevin Fitzpatrick (born December 17, 1973) is an American politician, attorney, and former Federal Bureau of Investigation (FBI) agent serving in the U.S. House of Representatives since 2017. His district in Pennsylvania, which was numbered the 8th district during his first term and the 1st district since 2019, includes all of Bucks County, a mostly suburban county north of Philadelphia, as well as a sliver of Montgomery County. A Republican, Fitzpatrick was first elected to Congress in 2016 and lost his bid for a sixth term to Democrat Bob Harvie in 2026.

== Early life and education ==
Brian Kevin Fitzpatrick was born on December 17, 1973, in Philadelphia and was raised in nearby Levittown, Pennsylvania. Fitzpatrick graduated from Bishop Egan High School in Fairless Hills in 1992. He graduated from La Salle University in 1996 with a Bachelor of Science in business administration. In 2001, Fitzpatrick completed both a Master of Business Administration from Pennsylvania State University and a Juris Doctor from the Penn State Dickinson School of Law.

== Career ==
Fitzpatrick is a former special assistant United States attorney and Federal Bureau of Investigation (FBI) supervisory special agent in California. At the FBI, he served as a national supervisor for the Bureau's Public Corruption Unit, and led the agency's Campaign Finance and Election Crimes Enforcement program. During his time in the FBI, he spent time in Kyiv, Ukraine; Mosul, Iraq; and Washington, D.C. He was embedded with U.S. Special Forces as part of Operation Iraqi Freedom.

== U.S. House of Representatives ==
=== Elections ===
==== 2016 ====
In 2016, Fitzpatrick ran for the open U.S. House seat of his brother Mike Fitzpatrick, who retired from Congress to uphold a promise to limit himself to four terms. In the April 26, 2016, Republican primary, Fitzpatrick received 78.4% of the vote, defeating Andy Warren and Marc Duome. State representative Steve Santarsiero defeated Shaughnessy Naughton for the Democratic nomination, 59.8% to 40.2%. Fitzpatrick won the general election with 54.4% of the vote to Santarsiero's 45.6%.

==== 2018 ====
After a court-ordered redistricting, Fitzpatrick's district was renumbered the 1st district. It remained largely unchanged from the old 8th, but absorbed a larger slice of central Montgomery County. According to Nate Cohn of The New York Times, "the old 8th had been one of the more regularly drawn districts in a map that had been thrown out as an unconstitutional partisan Republican gerrymander. The new 1st was slightly more Democratic than its predecessor. Had it existed in 2016, Hillary Clinton would have carried it with 49% of the vote to Donald Trump's 47%. In contrast, Clinton and Trump finished almost tied in the old 8th, with Trump winning by 0.2 percentage points."

In the Republican primary on May 15, 2018, Fitzpatrick defeated Dean Malik, 68.85% to 31.15%. Scott Wallace, the director of a charitable foundation, won the Democratic primary with 55.97% of the vote. In the general election, Fitzpatrick defeated Wallace, 51.3% to 48.7%. He carried Bucks County by 12,000 votes, more than his overall margin of 8,300 votes. Fitzpatrick thus became one of only three Republican U.S. representatives to survive during the 2018 U.S. House elections in congressional districts that Democratic presidential nominee Hillary Clinton carried in 2016, along with John Katko and Will Hurd.

==== 2020 ====
Fitzpatrick ran for a third term in 2020. In the Republican primary, he defeated Andrew Meehan, who ran as a more conservative candidate and a staunch supporter of President Donald Trump. The Democratic nominee was Ivyland Borough councilwoman Christina Finello. Fitzpatrick was considered potentially vulnerable because his district had voted for Clinton in 2016, but he was reelected by a margin of 13 percentage points even as Democratic presidential nominee Joe Biden won Pennsylvania and carried the district by 6 points. He was one of nine House Republicans to win in a district carried by Biden.

==== 2022 ====
In 2022, Fitzpatrick defeated Alex Entin in the Republican primary. In the general election, Fitzpatrick defeated Democratic candidate Ashley Ehasz.

==== 2024 ====
In 2024, Fitzpatrick defeated Mark Houck in the Republican primary. Fitzpatrick defeated Ashley Ehasz again in the general election in 2024. He is one of three Republicans to represent a district in which 2024 Democratic presidential nominee Kamala Harris won.

==== 2026 ====
In 2026, Fitzpatrick was unopposed in the Republican primary and faced Democratic nominee Bob Harvie, the chair of the Bucks County Board of Commissioners, in the general election, Harvie defeated Fitzpatrick 53% to 47%.

=== Tenure ===
In the 115th Congress, Fitzpatrick was ranked the second most bipartisan member of the House of Representatives by the Bipartisan Index, a metric created by the Lugar Center and Georgetown's McCourt School of Public Policy to assess congressional bipartisanship. In the 116th United States Congress, 117th Congress, and first session of the 118th Congress, Fitzpatrick was ranked first by the Bipartisan Index. For the first session of the 117th Congress, GovTrack noted that Fitzpatrick ranked in the 61st percentile for the most bills introduced. Additionally, they noted that he cosponsored the second most bills compared to all House of Representatives at 1333, and that of these, 80% were introduced by a non-Republican legislator; joining bipartisan bills the most out of all Representatives. Fitzpatrick was ranked the most bipartisan legislator again in 2024, his fifth straight year.

Fitzpatrick voted in line with Joe Biden's stated position 70% of the time during the 117th Congress, the highest rate of any member in the Republican conference. On February 4, 2021, Fitzpatrick joined 10 other Republican House members voting with all voting Democrats to strip Marjorie Taylor Greene of her Education and Labor Committee and Budget Committee assignments in response to controversial political statements she had made. On November 5, 2021, Fitzpatrick was among the 13 House Republicans who broke with their party and voted with a majority of Democrats for the Infrastructure Investment and Jobs Act, a $1.2 trillion infrastructure spending bill.

Fitzpatrick was the primary sponsor of three bills that Congress enacted. In 2025, Fitzpatrick was one of two Republicans who voted against the Senate-approved version of the One Big Beautiful Bill Act. He originally supported the House version of the bill, but opposed the larger cuts to SNAP and Medicaid the Senate passed. Fitzpatrick also voted against a subsequent bill cutting funding for public broadcasting.

==== Abortion ====
Fitzpatrick has often but not always aligned with anti-abortion stances. While abortion is not mentioned on his website, he co-signed a letter to President Donald Trump in 2019 that requested Trump veto any efforts to weaken anti-abortion policies. In 2017, he voted for the Pain-Capable Unborn Child Protection Act, which would prohibit abortions performed after 20 weeks of pregnancy, except in situations of incest or rape. Fitzpatrick voted against the Women's Health Protection Act of 2021, which aimed to protect health-care professionals by establishing a statutory right for them to provide abortions.

After the U.S. Supreme Court decided Dobbs v. Jackson Women's Health Organization, allowing states to ban abortion, Fitzpatrick said in a statement to state legislatures, "Any legislative consideration must always seek to achieve bipartisan consensus that both respects a woman’s privacy and autonomy, and also respects the sanctity of human life. These principles are not mutually exclusive; both can and must be achieved."

Fitzpatrick was one of three Republicans to vote for H.R. 8297: Ensuring Access to Abortion Act of 2022. Fitzpatrick also voted for H.R. 8373: The Right to Contraception Act. This bill was designed "to protect a person’s ability to access contraceptives and to engage in contraception, and to protect a health care provider’s ability to provide contraceptives, contraception, and information related to contraception".

==== Animal welfare ====
Fitzpatrick co-chairs the Congressional Animal Protection Caucus. In 2024, he received a 100+ rating from Humane World Action Fund's legislative scorecard. The organization named Fitzpatrick a Legislator of the Year in 2022 and 2023, as well as a Humane Champion in 2024—in each case, the highest available award on offer.

Fitzpatrick co-led a letter opposing the inclusion of the Ending Agricultural Trade Suppression (EATS) Act in the Farm Bill, which would have overturned state animal welfare laws. This action received praise from animal advocacy groups. With U.S. representative Earl Blumenauer (D-OR) and Senator Richard Blumenthal (D-CT), Fitzpatrick introduced the Captive Primate Safety Act in 2024, which would prohibit the private ownership of chimpanzees and other primates as pets. This proposed legislation was endorsed by law enforcement associations and animal welfare.

==== Antitrust ====
In 2022, Fitzpatrick was one of 39 Republicans to vote for the Merger Filing Fee Modernization Act of 2022, an antitrust package that would crack down on corporations for anti-competitive behavior.

==== Climate change ====
At a September 2018 forum hosted by the Bipartisan Policy Center and The Hill, Fitzpatrick highlighted man-made climate change as a serious issue, saying that Republicans must "acknowledge reality and [not] deny it." He is a member of the bipartisan congressional Climate Solutions Caucus and cointroduced the Energy Innovation and Carbon Dividend Act of 2018, which would impose a carbon tax with net revenue returned to households as a rebate. He did not sponsor the 2019 version of the bill.

As of 2022, Fitzpatrick has a lifetime score of 74% on the National Environmental Scorecard of the League of Conservation Voters, and is ranked as the most environmentally friendly Republican member of the House, rating higher than three Democrats. In March 2023, Fitzpatrick was the only Republican House member to vote against H.R. 1, Lower Energy Costs Act, which passed the House by a vote of 225–204, with four Democrats voting for it. Senate majority leader Chuck Schumer said the bill was "a giveaway to Big Oil pretending to be an energy package" and would roll back regulations for fossil fuel production.

==== Foreign policy ====
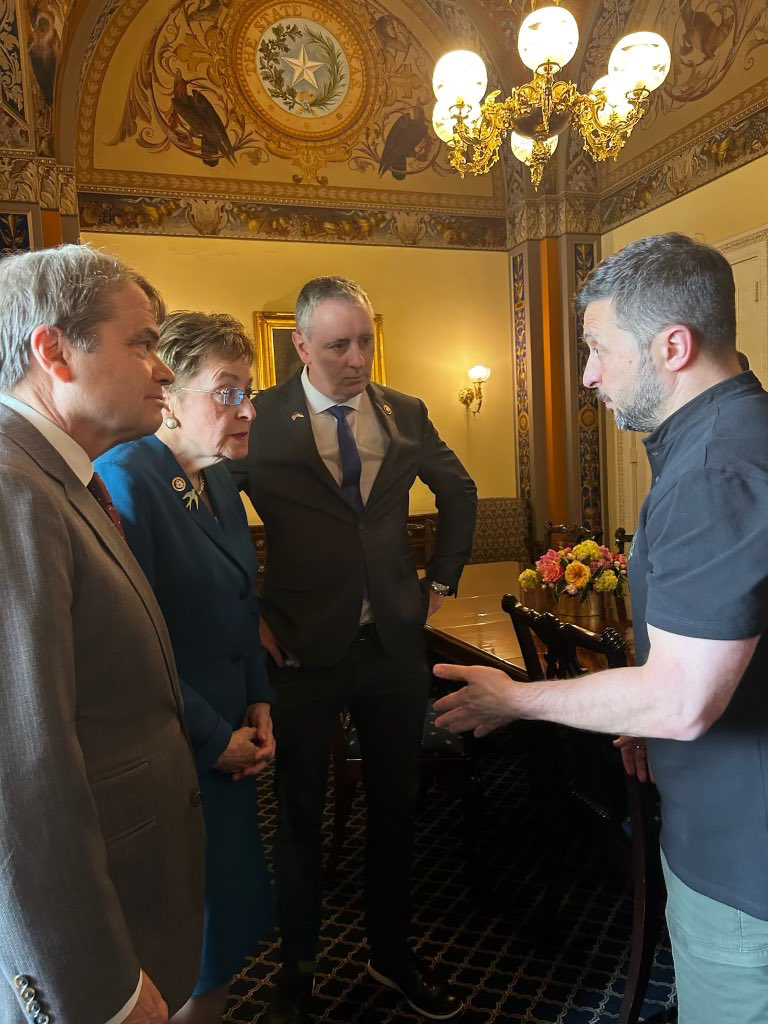
Fitzpatrick and other members of Congress meet with Ukrainian President Volodymyr Zelenskyy in July 2024

In March 2024, Fitzpatrick filed a discharge petition for the bipartisan Defending Borders, Defending Democracies Act, which would have granted 47.7 billion dollars to Ukraine, 10.4 billion dollars to Israel, and 4.9 billion dollars to the United States's Indo-Pacific allies, while also limiting federal funding for the transfer of migrants and require asylum seekers remain in Mexico awaiting their court dates.

===== Israel =====
Fitzpatrick voted to provide Israel with support following the October 7 attack on Israel. Fitzpatrick has received donations from Pro-Israel lobby AIPAC.

===== Iran war =====
Fitzpatrick initially voted against a March 2026 war powers resolution that would have limited the 2026 Iran war, stating that it was "irresponsibly drafted and dangerously overbroad". He introduced his own war powers resolution in April 2026 to withdraw the military from the Iran war. In May, June, and July 2026, he voted for similar bills proposed to limit the Iran war. About his vote, Fitzpatrick said it was consistent with a legal requirement, per the War Powers Act of 1973, that "within 60 days of hostilities … the matter be approved by Congress".

===== Russia =====
In a 2018 debate, Fitzpatrick said that Russia held "by and large sinister motives", noting that while he was stationed in Ukraine, Russia twice attempted to knock out Ukraine's electrical grids through cyber attacks. In April 2018, Fitzpatrick said that Trump should stop attacking the FBI and allow Robert Mueller to complete his investigation, saying it was improper to "judge an institution based on the actions of a few bad actors". In July 2018, Fitzpatrick said that Russian leader Vladimir Putin had "manipulated" Trump at the Helsinki Summit. Fitzpatrick said he was "frankly sickened by the exchange" between Trump and Putin. He criticized the "mixed signals" that the Trump administration was sending regarding Russian interference in the 2016 election.

==== Gerrymandering ====
In September 2017, Fitzpatrick urged the U.S. Supreme Court to limit extreme partisan gerrymandering in Gill v. Whitford. He stressed that partisan redistricting had undermined the Founding Fathers' vision of the House of Representatives as the voice of the people. Fitzpatrick was the only Republican member of Congress from Pennsylvania not to take part in a February 2018 lawsuit challenging a new district map drawn by Democrats. He explained that he opposes the drawing of congressional districts by elected officials of either party, saying instead that they should be drawn by independent, nonpartisan citizen panels.

==== Gun control ====
In 2018, Fitzpatrick was the only Republican endorsed by the Giffords Law Center to Prevent Gun Violence, the gun control organization founded by former U.S. representative Gabby Giffords. He voted to expand background checks and restrict assault weapon sales. He voted against a bill that would require states to recognize concealed-carry permits issued by other states. In March 2021, Fitzpatrick was one of eight Republicans to join the House majority in passing the Bipartisan Background Checks Act of 2021.

On June 24, 2022, Fitzpatrick was one of the 14 House Republicans who joined all Democrats in voting for the Bipartisan Safer Communities Act. On July 29, 2022, Fitzpatrick and one other Republican, Chris Jacobs, joined the Democrats in voting for a bill banning assault weapons. In the 2022 midterm elections, Fitzpatrick was the only Republican member of Congress to receive an "F" rating from the NRA Political Victory Fund. On June 13, 2023, Fitzpatrick and one other Republican, Thomas Kean Jr. of New Jersey, voted with Democrats against HJ 44, a bill repealing the ATF's new regulations on Pistol Braces.

==== Health care ====
Fitzpatrick opposed the American Health Care Act, a bill to repeal and replace the Patient Protection and Affordable Care Act. In a statement, he said, "After considering the current healthcare bill in a thorough and deliberate manner, I have concluded that, although the American Health Care Act focuses on several much-needed reforms to our healthcare system, in its current form I cannot support this legislation". Fitzpatrick joined many of his Republican colleagues as well as every congressional Democrat in opposing the bill.

On May 4, 2017, Fitzpatrick also voted against the second attempt to pass the American Health Care Act. In a statement, he said, "We saw what happened when healthcare reform – an issue impacting 1/5 of our economy – was rushed through Congress along extremely partisan lines in 2009," referring to the ACA in 2010. On December 12, he took part in the Democratic bill to lower drug costs, the Elijah Cummings Lower Drug Costs Now Act.

In December 2025, ahead of the expiration of ACA subsidies, Fitzpatrick co-sponsored a bill that would extend the subsidies for two years and implement new eligibility requirements and anti-fraud measures. When House Republican leadership declined to bring the bill to a vote, Fitzpatrick filed a discharge petition. A week later, Fitzpatrick, Rob Bresnahan, Ryan Mackenzie, and Mike Lawler would provide the necessary signatures on a separate Democrat-led discharge petition to force a vote on extending the subsidies for three years. Despite signing onto the discharge petition, Fitzpatrick also voted for a Republican bill that did not extend the subsidies.

==== Immigration ====
In 2017, Fitzpatrick was critical of President Obama's executive order establishing the DACA program, but said the immigration system was broken. In a 2018 debate, he said he supported a path to citizenship for DREAMers, but that "any immigration reform package has to deal with border security." In 2019, he voted for the American Dream and Promise Act, which included no new border security measures.

Fitzpatrick opposed Trump's 2017 executive order to impose a temporary ban on entry to the U.S. to citizens of seven Muslim-majority countries, saying, "the president's policy entirely misses the mark." In 2025, Fitzpatrick cosponsored the American Families United Act. In 2026, Fitzpatrick was a cosponsor of the DIGNIDAD Act, which proposes a pathway to legal status for up to 12 million illegal immigrants, paired with stricter border enforcement and mandatory work and restitution requirements.

==== LGBTQ+ rights ====
In 2019, he co-sponsored and voted for the Equality Act, which would extend anti-discrimination protections to LGBT adults and minors; seven other House Republicans joined him in voting for it and it passed the House 236–173. He was one of three Republicans to vote for it in 2021 when it again passed the House. In 2022, Fitzpatrick was one of six Republicans to vote for the Global Respect Act, which sanctions foreign persons responsible for violations of internationally recognized human rights against lesbian, gay, bisexual, transgender, queer, and intersex (LGBTQI) individuals, and for other purposes.

In September 2025, Fitzpatrick co-sponsored the 988 LGBTQ+ Youth Access Act of 2025, a House bill seeking to restore funding to the 988 Suicide and Crisis Lifeline, specifically for LGBTQ+ services. The House bill was introduced by House member Raja Krishnamoorthi, and co-sponsored by representatives Mike Lawler, Seth Moulton, and Sharice Davids, with companion legislation introduced in the Senate by Senators Tammy Baldwin and Lisa Murkowski. It was supported by the Trevor Project, the American Foundation for Suicide Prevention, the National Alliance on Mental Illness, GLSEN, and the Human Rights Campaign.

===== Gay rights =====
Fitzpatrick supports same-sex marriage. On July 19, 2022, Fitzpatrick and 46 other Republican representatives voted for the Respect for Marriage Act, which would codify the right to same-sex marriage in federal law. When asked in early 2026 whether his fellow Republican politicians should get involved with the Greater Than campaign, which seeks to overturns Obergefell v. Hodges, Fitzpatrick said they should only do so by "opposing it," adding, "I support gay marriage."

===== Transgender rights =====
On December 17, 2025, Fitzpatrick was one of four Republicans to vote against the Protect Children's Innocence Act, which would ban access of gender-affirming care to minors.

==== Narcotics trafficking ====
Fitzpatrick sponsored the International Narcotics Trafficking Emergency Response by Detecting Incoming Contraband with Technology (INTERDICT) Act, which Trump signed into law in January 2018. The law directs $15 million to U.S. Customs and Border Patrol to expand screening for fentanyl and opioids at the U.S. border.

==== Donald Trump ====
During the 2016 election cycle, Fitzpatrick said he would support the presidential candidate Republican primary voters in the 8th District chose. After Donald Trump was made the nominee, Fitzpatrick reneged and said he would not vote for either major party candidate. He instead wrote-in Mike Pence in 2016, but did vote for Trump in 2020. In 2024, Fitzpatrick wrote-in Nikki Haley. In July 2019, Fitzpatrick was one of four Republican House members who voted to condemn remarks that Trump had made about the Squad, a group of Democratic U.S. Representatives, all of whom were women of color. Trump had tweeted about the group, calling on them to "go back and help fix the totally broken and crime infested places from which they came".

After newsite LevittownNow.com obtained audio of Trump endorsing Fitzpatrick's 2020 re-election, Fitzpatrick's office removed the publication from its press release list, and Fitzpatrick himself also neglected to participate in a pre-primary interview with LevittownNow in 2022. Fitzpatrick voted against both of Trump's impeachments in 2019 and 2021. Before the second impeachment vote, he introduced a censure resolution against Trump that condemned the rhetoric that led to the January 6 Capitol attack. On May 19, 2021, Fitzpatrick was one of 35 Republicans to join all Democrats in voting to approve legislation to establish the January 6 commission meant to investigate the storming of the U.S. Capitol. He was reportedly the only House Republican to attend a 2023 ceremony marking the second anniversary of the Capitol attack. Fitzpatrick called the attack a "terrible day that we can never let happen again".

==== Taxes ====
In December 2017, Fitzpatrick voted for the Tax Cuts and Jobs Act in a party-line vote.

==== Term limits and congressional perks ====
In April 2018, Fitzpatrick led a bipartisan group of freshmen House members in an Oval Office meeting at which they discussed with Trump a proposed constitutional amendment imposing congressional term limits. In May 2018, Fitzpatrick and Stephanie Murphy introduced H.R. 5946, the Fostering Accountability, Integrity, Trust, and Honor (FAITH) in Congress Act, which would "end certain special perks reserved for Members of Congress, enact a lifetime ban preventing former Members of Congress from becoming lobbyists, and withhold Members' paychecks if they fail to pass a budget on time". Fitzpatrick was one of the original 16 cosponsors of the Restore Trust in Congress Act (H.R.5106), introduced on September 3rd, 2025, by Republican Chip Roy of Texas. The act, a bipartisan effort to ban members of Congress and their spouses and dependents from owning and trading stocks, had 119 cosponsors as of December, 2025.

==== Steve Bannon ====
On October 21, 2021, Fitzpatrick was one of nine House Republicans to vote to hold Steve Bannon in contempt of Congress.

==== 2024 presidential election ====
Fitzpatrick was one of six Republicans to sign a bipartisan letter spearheaded by centrist House Representatives in which they pledged to respect the results of the 2024 presidential election.

=== Committee assignments ===
- Committee on Ways and Means
  - Subcommittee on Health
  - Subcommittee on Oversight and Investigations
- Permanent Select Committee on Intelligence
  - Subcommittee on National Intelligence, Chairman
  - Subcommittee Defense Intelligence and Space Force

Former:

- Committee on Foreign Affairs
  - Subcommittee on Middle East, North Africa, and International Terrorism
  - Subcommittee on Europe, Eurasia, Energy, and the Environment
- Committee on Transportation and Infrastructure
  - Subcommittee on Aviation
  - Subcommittee on Highways and Transit
  - Subcommittee on Railroads, Pipelines, and Hazardous Materials

=== Caucus memberships ===
- Problem Solvers Caucus (Co-Chair)
- Ukraine Caucus (Co-Chair)
- Congressional Solar Caucus
- Congressional Taiwan Caucus
- Republican Governance Group
- Congressional Caucus on Turkey and Turkish Americans
- Rare Disease Caucus
- United States–China Working Group

== Personal life ==
Fitzpatrick lives in Middletown Township, Bucks County. He is a member of the Levittown Ancient Order of Hibernians and the Knights of Columbus. In June 2026, Fitzpatrick married Fox News reporter Jacqui Heinrich.

U.S. House of Representatives
Preceded by Mike Fitzpatrick	Member of the U.S. House of Representatives from Pennsylvania's 8th congressional district 2017–2019	Succeeded by Matt Cartwright
Preceded by Bob Brady	Member of the U.S. House of Representatives from Pennsylvania's 1st congressional district 2019–present	Incumbent
Party political offices
Preceded by Tom Reed	Republican Co-Chair of the Problem Solvers Caucus; 2021–present Served alongside: Josh Gottheimer, Tom Suozzi	Incumbent
U.S. order of precedence (ceremonial)
Preceded by Adriano Espaillat	United States representatives by seniority 164th	Succeeded by Vicente Gonzalez
