= Conwell–Egan Catholic High School =

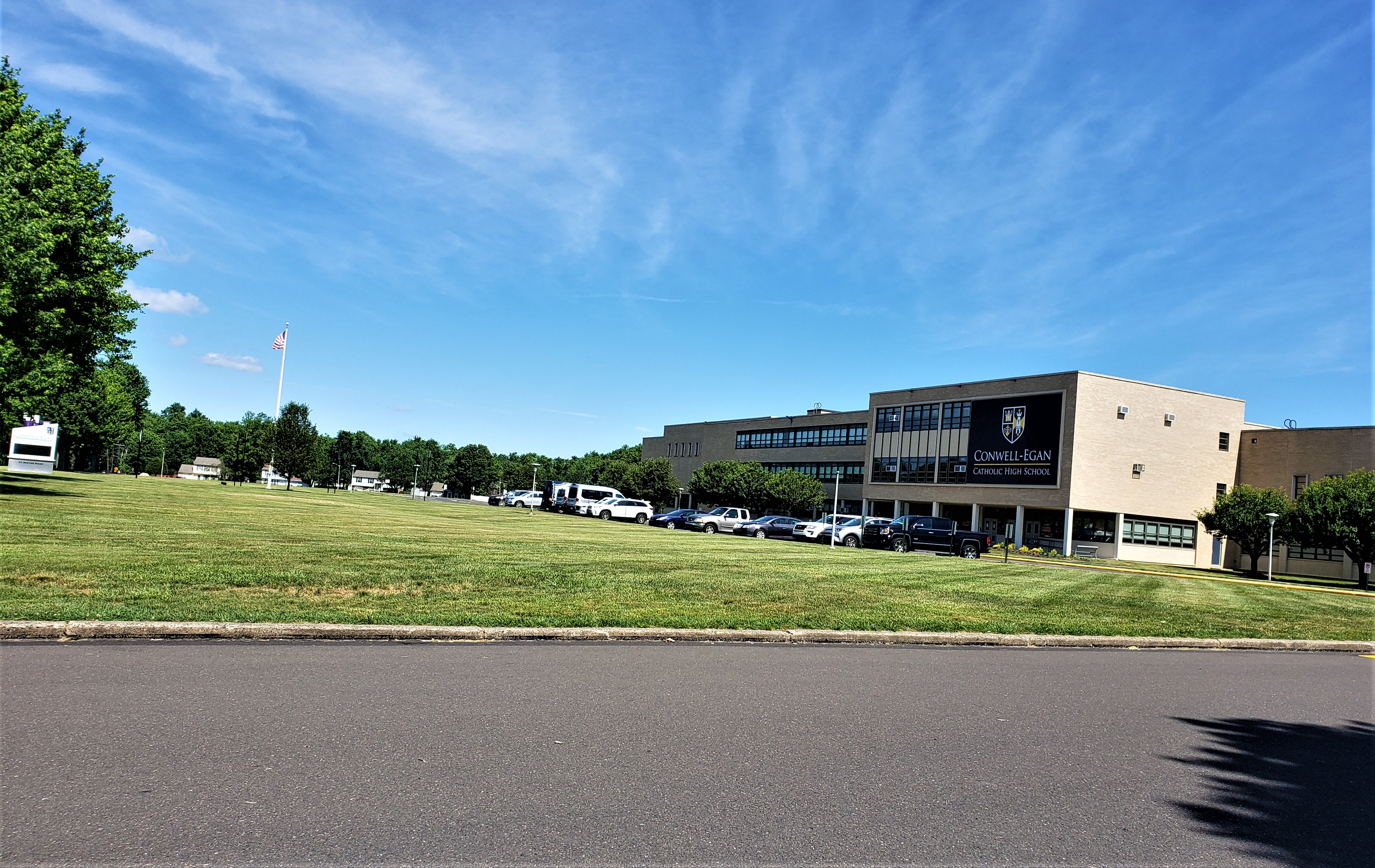

Location
- 611 Wistar Road; Fairless Hills, Pennsylvania 19030; United States; 40°9′44″N 74°50′59″W

Information
- Type: Private, parochial
- Motto: Character, Excellence, Commitment
- Religious affiliation: Roman Catholic
- Established: 1957
- Oversight: Archdiocese of Philadelphia
- School code: 691-671
- President: Matthew Fischer
- Principal: Joshua Bower
- Faculty: 43 (2025)
- Grades: 9-12
- Gender: coeducational
- Colors: Royal blue and white
- Athletics conference: Philadelphia Catholic League
- Nickname: Eagles
- Accreditation: Middle States Association of Colleges and Schools
- Publication: The Secret Rose (literary magazine, defunct)
- Yearbook: Aerie
- Website: www.conwell-egan.org

Conwell–Egan Catholic High School is a coeducational, Catholic high school in Fairless Hills, Pennsylvania. It is located in the Roman Catholic Archdiocese of Philadelphia.

== History ==
The modern Conwell–Egan was formed in 1993 when the all-girls Bishop Conwell High School was closed and merged into the existing facilities of the all-boys Bishop Egan High School in Fairless Hills.

== Athletics ==
The boys' basketball team won the PIAA Class AA State Championship on March 21, 2015.

== Notable alumni ==
- Keith Armstrong (born 1963, class of 1982), Tampa Bay Buccaneers special teams coordinator
- Jim Cawley (born 1969, class of 1987), former Lieutenant Governor of Pennsylvania
- Brian Fitzpatrick (born 1973, class of 1992), 2-term U.S. House Representative (PA-8 (2016-2018), PA-1 (2018–Present))
- Mike Fitzpatrick (1963–2020, class of 1981), 4-term U.S. House Representative (PA-8)
- Larry Marshall (born 1950, class of 1968), defensive back, kick returner and wide receiver for NFL's Kansas City Chiefs and Philadelphia Eagles
- Joe McEwing (born 1972, class of 1990), former professional baseball player, current Chicago White Sox 3rd base coach
- Leo Rossi (born 1946), actor, star of such films as The Accused, Relentless and Analyze This
- Mark S. Schweiker (born 1953, class of 1970), former Governor of Pennsylvania
- Steve Slaton (born 1986, class of 2005), All-American football running back, Heisman Trophy finalist, College Football Hall of Fame Miami Dolphins running back
- Thomas G. Waites (born 1955), actor and playwright, star of such films as The Warriors, The Thing and And Justice for All
- Bob Zupcic (born 1966, class of 1984), outfielder who played in MLB for the Boston Red Sox and Chicago White Sox
