= Tech High School =

Tech High, Tech High School, or Technical High School could refer to:

Brazil

- Technical High School of Campinas
- Technical High School of Limeira

India

- Technical High School Payyoli

Jamaica

- "Technical high school", the nomenclature for secondary education in Jamaica

United States

- Arsenal Technical High School (1912–present) in Indianapolis, Indiana
- Bucks County Technical High School (1958–present) in Fairless Hills, Pennsylvania
- Hutchinson Central Technical High School (1954–present) in Buffalo, New York
- Wendell Krinn Technical High School in New Port Richey, Florida
- Greene County Technical High School in Paragould, Arkansas
- McKinley Technology High School (1926–1997; 2004–present), formerly McKinley Technical High School, in Washington, D.C.
- Memphis Technical High School (1911–1987) in Memphis, Tennessee
- Oakland Technical High School (1914–present) in Oakland, California
- Technological High School, a former name of Midtown High School (1924–present) in Atlanta, Georgia
- Technical High School (1923–present) in Omaha, Nebraska
- Technical High School (Salt Lake City), in National Register of Historic Places listings in Salt Lake City
- Technical Senior High School (1917–present) in Saint Cloud, Minnesota
- Technology High School (Rohnert Park, California) in Rohnert Park, California
- Technical High School, Springfield, Massachusetts (1905–1986)

United Kingdom

- Secondary technical school, a type of secondary school in England and Wales in the mid-20th century
