= Keith Armstrong (American football) =

American football coach (born 1963)

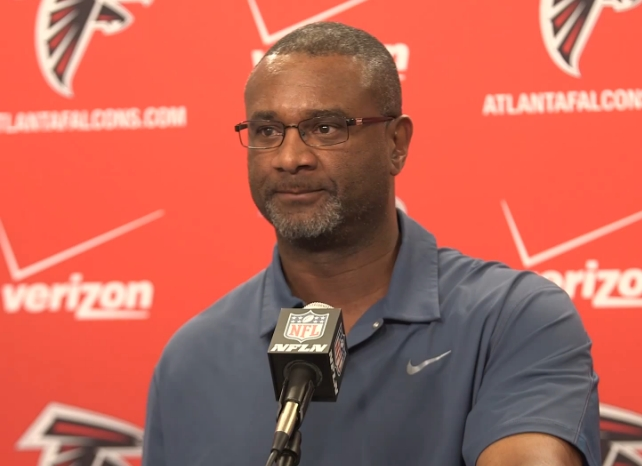
- Armstrong in 2015

Profile
- Position: Running back

Personal information
- Born: December 15, 1963 (age 62); Trenton, New Jersey, U.S.

Career information
- High school: Fairless Hills (PA) Egan
- College: Temple

Career history
- Temple (1987) Graduate assistant; Miami (FL) (1988) Special teams coordinator & assistant defensive backs coach; Akron (1989) Wide receivers coach; Oklahoma State (1990–1992) Secondary coach; Notre Dame (1993) Special teams coordinator & linebackers coach; Atlanta Falcons (1994–1995) Safeties coach; Atlanta Falcons (1996) Secondary coach; Chicago Bears (1997–2000) Special teams coordinator; Miami Dolphins (2001–2007) Special teams coordinator; Atlanta Falcons (2008–2018) Special teams coordinator; Tampa Bay Buccaneers (2019–2023) Special teams coordinator

Awards and highlights
- Super Bowl champion (LV)

Keith Armstrong (born December 15, 1963) is an American football coach. He was the special teams coordinator for the Tampa Bay Buccaneers of the National Football League (NFL) from 2019 to 2023. Armstrong has over two decades of professional coaching experience. He played college football at Temple.

On December 31, 2012, NFL.com reported that Armstrong was expected to be interviewed by the Chicago Bears for the head coaching position after Lovie Smith's firing. He also met with the Philadelphia Eagles about possibly replacing Andy Reid.

In the 2016 season, Armstrong and the Falcons reached Super Bowl LI, where they faced the New England Patriots. In the Super Bowl, the Falcons fell in a 34–28 overtime defeat.

On January 9, 2019, Armstrong agreed to become special teams coordinator of the Tampa Bay Buccaneers, rejoining the staff of Bruce Arians who was the head coach of the Temple Owls when Armstrong began his coaching career. Armstrong earned his first Super Bowl title when the Buccaneers won Super Bowl LV. He retired following the Buccaneers' 2023 season.

== Personal life ==
Armstrong grew up in Levittown, Pennsylvania, and played high school football at Bishop Egan High School in Fairless Hills, Pennsylvania. Keith and his wife, Kathleen, have two daughters, Kaitlin and Kristen.
