= Larry Marshall (American football) =

American football player (born 1950)

No. 22, 48, 20, 44
- Positions: Defensive back, kickoff returner, wide receiver

Personal information
- Born: March 2, 1950 (age 76); Philadelphia, Pennsylvania, U.S.
- Listed height: 5 ft 10 in (1.78 m)
- Listed weight: 195 lb (88 kg)

Career information
- High school: Conwell–Egan Catholic (Fairless Hills, Pennsylvania)
- College: Maryland
- NFL draft: 1972: 15th round, 387th overall pick

Career history
- Kansas City Chiefs (1972–1973); Minnesota Vikings (1974); Philadelphia Eagles (1974–1977); Kansas City Chiefs (1978); Los Angeles Rams (1978)

Career NFL statistics
- Punt return yards: 1,466
- Kick return yards: 3,396
- Fumble recoveries: 10
- Stats at Pro Football Reference

Lawrence Eugene Marshall (born March 2, 1950) is an American former professional football player who was a defensive back, kick returner, and wide receiver for seven seasons in the National Football League (NFL).

He played college football for the Maryland Terrapins. Marshall played in the NFL for the Kansas City Chiefs, Minnesota Vikings, Philadelphia Eagles, and Los Angeles Rams. He has the distinction for having 300 career touches (162 punt returns and 138 kick off returns).

Marshall attended Bishop Egan High School in Fairless Hills, Pennsylvania from 1964 to 1968, and under the direction of Coach Dick Bedesem, helped the Eagles to back-to-back Philadelphia City Title wins in 1966 and 1967.
