= Taking the Hill =

Taking the Hill is a news and commentary series broadcast on MSNBC in the United States. Hosted by Iraq War veteran and former Congress member Patrick J. Murphy, the series focused on "leadership, public service and breaking down the civil-military divide in the country". It began on November 6, 2013 as a one-hour discussion accompanying the documentary Wounded: The Battle Back Home. The show became a regular series in December 2013. Taking the Hill was broadcast on the fourth Sunday monthly.

In its multi-year run, the show generated many awards to include the CLIO Award in conjunction with the Wounded Warrior Project and Imagine Dragons, for their running series, Wounded: The Battle Back Home. Murphy also received the Sherwood Award for his role as host and executive producer of Taking the Hill.

Taking the Hill was cancelled when Murphy was nominated to serve as the Under Secretary of the Army by the Obama Administration. It was later recreated in the form of a political action committee, supporting veterans running for office in the United States.
