= Sotcher Farmhouse =

Historic house in Pennsylvania, United States

- U.S. National Register of Historic Places
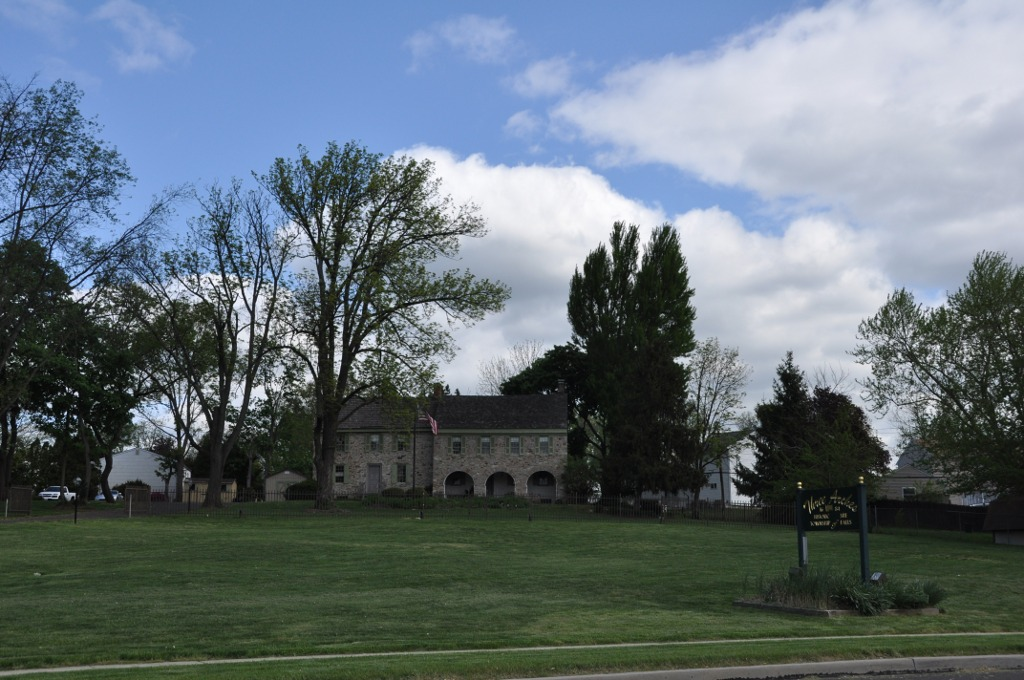
- Sotcher Farmhouse, April 2012

- Location within Pennsylvania Location within the United States
- Location: 335 Trenton Rd., Fairless Hills, Pennsylvania
- Coordinates: 40°10′41″N 74°51′27″W
- Area: 1 acre (0.40 ha)
- Built: c. 1712, c. 1760, c. 1806
- Built by: Sotcher, John
- NRHP reference No.: 77001125
- Added to NRHP: December 27, 1977

The Sotcher Farmhouse, also known as "Three Arches," is an historic home that is located in Fairless Hills, Falls Township, Bucks County, Pennsylvania, United States.

It was added to the National Register of Historic Places in 1977.

== History and architectural features ==
The original house was built circa 1712, with substantial additions made circa 1760 and 1806. The original house was likely a one-story, stone structure. The 1760 section is a two-story, three-bay fieldstone structure. The 1806 addition completely enveloped the 1712 house. It is a 2 1/2-story, four-bay fieldstone structure that incorporates the house's distinctive three arches.
