= Patrick Murphy (Pennsylvania politician) =

American politician (born 1973)

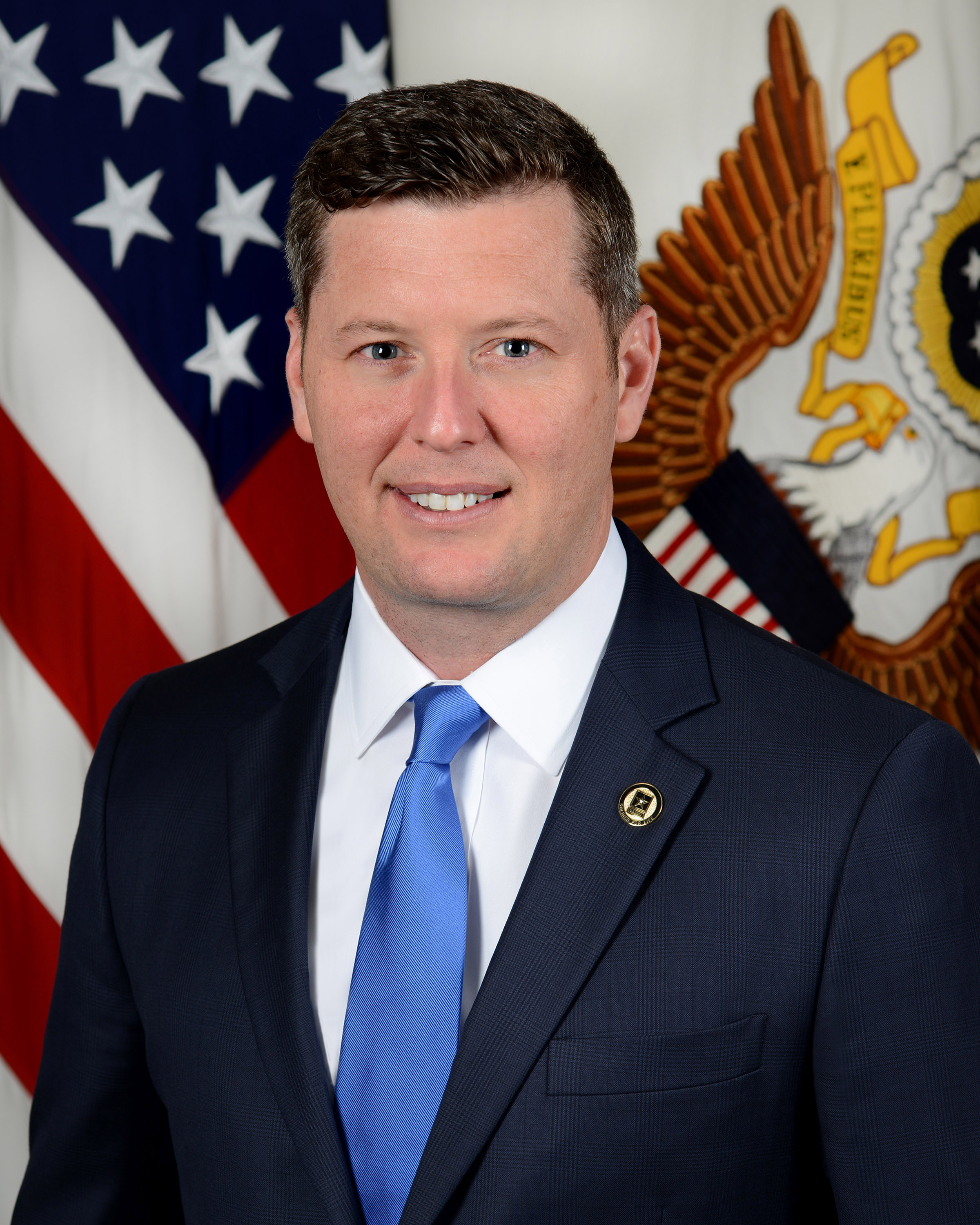
- Official portrait, 2016

32nd United States Under Secretary of the Army
- In office January 4, 2016 – January 20, 2017
- President: Barack Obama
- Preceded by: Brad Carson
- Succeeded by: Ryan D. McCarthy

United States Secretary of the Army
- Acting
- In office January 11, 2016 – May 17, 2016
- President: Barack Obama
- Preceded by: Eric Fanning (acting)
- Succeeded by: Eric Fanning

Member of the U.S. House of Representatives from Pennsylvania's 8th district
- In office January 3, 2007 – January 3, 2011
- Preceded by: Mike Fitzpatrick
- Succeeded by: Mike Fitzpatrick

Personal details
- Born: Patrick Joseph Murphy; October 19, 1973 (age 53) Philadelphia, Pennsylvania, U.S.
- Party: Democratic
- Spouse: Jennifer Safford (m. 2006; div. 2019)
- Children: 2
- Education: Kings College (BA); Widener University (JD)

Military service
- Branch/service: United States Army
- Years of service: 1996–2004
- Rank: Captain
- Unit: 82nd Airborne Division; Army Judge Advocate General's Corps
- Battles/wars: Iraq War
- Awards: Bronze Star

Patrick Joseph Murphy (born October 19, 1973) is an American politician and attorney who served as the 32nd United States Under Secretary of the Army. He was the first veteran of the Iraq War to be elected to the United States House of Representatives, representing Pennsylvania's 8th congressional district from 2007 to 2011. Murphy is a former anchor of Taking the Hill on MSNBC. Murphy is currently on the faculty of Wharton Business School and the Distinguished Chair of Innovation at the United States Military Academy.

Murphy was confirmed by voice vote as Under Secretary of the Army by the U.S. Senate on December 18, 2015, after having been nominated for the position by the President on August 5, 2015. Murphy was sworn into the post on January 4, 2016.

Murphy was considered by the leadership of the presidential transition of Joe Biden to serve as United States Secretary of Veterans Affairs, after having been considered for the same post by President Obama in 2014. Denis McDonough, former White House chief of staff was chosen instead.

== Early life and education ==
Murphy was born in Philadelphia and raised in that city's Northeast area, the son of a city police officer and a legal secretary. As a high school student, Murphy worked weekends as a security guard in the rowdy "700 Level" of Veterans Stadium during Philadelphia Eagles and Temple University football games.

Murphy graduated from Archbishop Ryan High School in Northeast Philadelphia. He attended Bucks County Community College before enrolling at King's College, Wilkes-Barre, Pennsylvania, where he was captain of the ice hockey team, Student Government President and a member of the Sigma Kappa Sigma fraternity. Murphy was a cadet in the U.S. Army ROTC at the neighboring University of Scranton, graduating from Scranton's Royal Warriors Battalion in 1996.

After earning a Bachelor of Arts degree from King's College in 1996, he was commissioned as a second lieutenant in the Army Reserve. In lieu of going directly into the active duty Army with a Reserve commission, he remained in the inactive Army Reserve while attending law school and working part-time as a legislative aide to a member of the Pennsylvania state legislature.

Murphy attended law school at the Widener University Commonwealth Law School in Harrisburg, earning a J.D. in 1999. He became a member of the Trial Advocacy Honor Society and president of the St. Thomas More Society at Widener.

== Career ==
During law school, he worked in the office of the Philadelphia District Attorney, and later as a leader in the Harrisburg Civil Law Clinic, a legal aid society serving the poor, while concurrently serving as a drilling JAG officer in the Army Reserve. He also served as the legislative aide to Thomas Tangretti, a Democratic member of the Pennsylvania House of Representatives from Westmoreland County. He taught American politics and government at Mount Saint Mary's University. After returning from active duty, Murphy joined Cozen O'Connor, a large U.S. law firm based in Philadelphia.

In 2010, Murphy joined the National Leadership Society Omicron Delta Kappa, along with Peyton Manning and Joe Paterno.

=== Military service ===
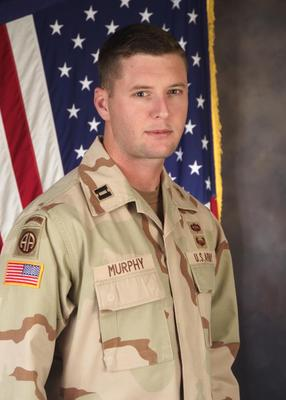
CPT Patrick Murphy in 2003.

Murphy attended The JAG School and entered U.S. Army JAG Corps. In 2000, Murphy went on active duty in the Army, serving as a judge advocate and then joining the military faculty at the U.S. Military Academy at West Point, where he taught constitutional law. He has also lectured at the U.S. Air Force Academy, the International Institute for Humanitarian Rights in Sanremo, Italy, and at Widener University. After the attacks of September 11, 2001, Murphy volunteered for overseas deployment, serving in Bosnia (2002) and in Baghdad during the Iraq War (2003–04).

While in Baghdad as a JAG Corps attorney with the U.S. 82nd Airborne Division, Murphy worked to reconstruct the justice system and helped prosecute Sheik Mohammed Ali Hassan al-Moayad, a lieutenant of Muqtada al-Sadr. Prior to being assigned to the 82nd, Murphy qualified as a Basic Parachutist and graduated the Air Assault course. He was awarded the Bronze Star Medal for meritorious service in Iraq. Following his service in Iraq, he returned to Fort Bragg and continued his service as a JAG officer before being released from active duty in 2004.

== Awards and decorations ==
Murphy's personal decorations include:

- Bronze Star Medal
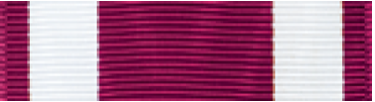
- Meritorious Service Medal
- Army Commendation Medal
- Army Achievement Medal
- National Defense Service Medal
- Armed Forces Expeditionary Medal
- Iraq Campaign Medal
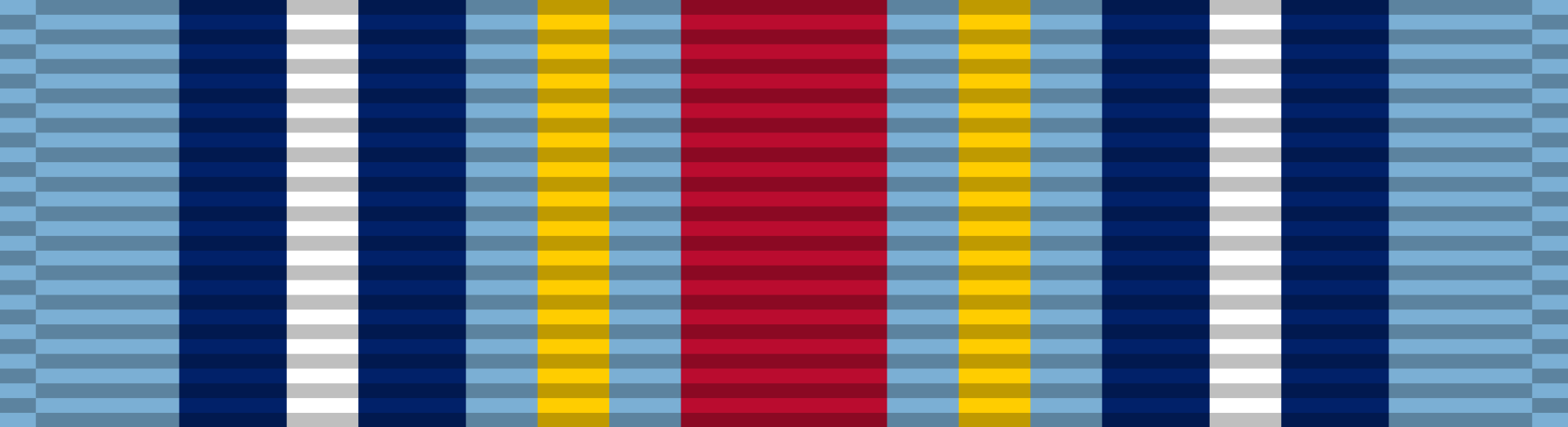
- Global War on Terrorism Expeditionary Medal
- Global War on Terrorism Service Medal
- Army Service Ribbon
- Presidential Unit Citation

== Political campaigns ==
=== 2006 election ===
In 2005, Murphy decided to challenge Republican incumbent Representative Mike Fitzpatrick in Pennsylvania's 8th congressional district as a Fighting Dem, building his campaign around "Murphy Plans" for Iraq, ethics reform, online protection, and a GI Bill of Rights.

On May 16, 2006, he won the Democratic primary with about 65% of the vote, against Andrew Warren, a former county commissioner and ex-Republican who badly trailed Murphy in campaign funds.

Polls taken in October 2006 generally showed a tight race between Murphy and Fitzpatrick. On election day, Murphy's campaign, led by campaign manager Scott Fairchild and GOTV Director Brent Welder, engaged in a massive get-out-the-vote effort with over 2000 volunteers knocking on 160,000 doors.

The resulting high turnout in Democratic lower Bucks County and Philadelphia, combined with surprisingly strong returns for Murphy in Republican upper Bucks County, was enough to push Murphy over Fitzpatrick 125,656 to 124,138. Murphy narrowly lost the Bucks County portion of the district (116,669 to 115,645), but decisively won the Philadelphia County portion (6,024 to 5,048) and the Montgomery County portion (3,987 to 2,421). Overall, he received 50.3% of the vote. Murphy was helped by a large national Democratic "wave" that swept 31 new Democrats into Congress, enabling the Democrats to win control of the U.S. House for the first time since 1994.

Murphy was only the third Democrat elected to represent Bucks County in American history. He was the first since Peter Kostmayer lost re-election in 1992.

=== 2008 election ===
Murphy faced Republican Tom Manion, a retired Marine Corps Reserve Colonel and executive at Johnson & Johnson, as well as independent Tom Lingenfelter. Significant national attention was drawn to the race because of both candidates' connections to the Iraq War. Murphy was a strong critic of Bush's war strategy, while Manion, whose son (1st Lt Travis Manion, USMC) was killed in Iraq in April 2007, supported the Iraq War Surge.

Congressman Murphy won election to a second term with 57 percent of the vote. He won re-election to a second term by increasing his margin in Democratic Lower Bucks County while at the same time winning many rural townships in Upper Bucks and keeping his margin down in Central Bucks. During the campaign, Murphy received support from many nationally known figures including George Clooney, Scarlett Johansson, and Ben Affleck.

=== 2010 election ===
Murphy was defeated by Republican nominee and former U.S. Congressman Mike Fitzpatrick, whom Murphy had defeated in 2006. Murphy lost to Fitzpatrick by 7 points.

=== 2012 Pennsylvania Attorney General race ===
On April 20, 2011, Murphy announced his candidacy for Attorney General of Pennsylvania. His announcement was accompanied by over thirty endorsements from prominent elected officials and organizations across the state.

On January 14, 2012, the Pennsylvania Democratic State Committee met in State College to determine its statewide endorsements for the 2012 primary season. No candidate got the two-thirds majority necessary to be endorsed by the state party, but Murphy led on both ballots, winning 161 votes (50.6 percent) on the first ballot and 191 votes (60.4 percent) on the second ballot. The political website PoliticsPA reported that "Murphy's strong performance can be credited to years of ground work and party building; many members spoke of times that he had visited their counties and supported their local party." Murphy was nominated by Montgomery County chairman Marcel Groen.

On April 24, 2012, Murphy was defeated 53–47 by Kathleen Kane in the primary election for Pennsylvania Attorney General. He did well in the Philadelphia area and the City of Pittsburgh but lost much of the rest of the Central and Southwestern parts of the state.

== U.S. House of Representatives ==
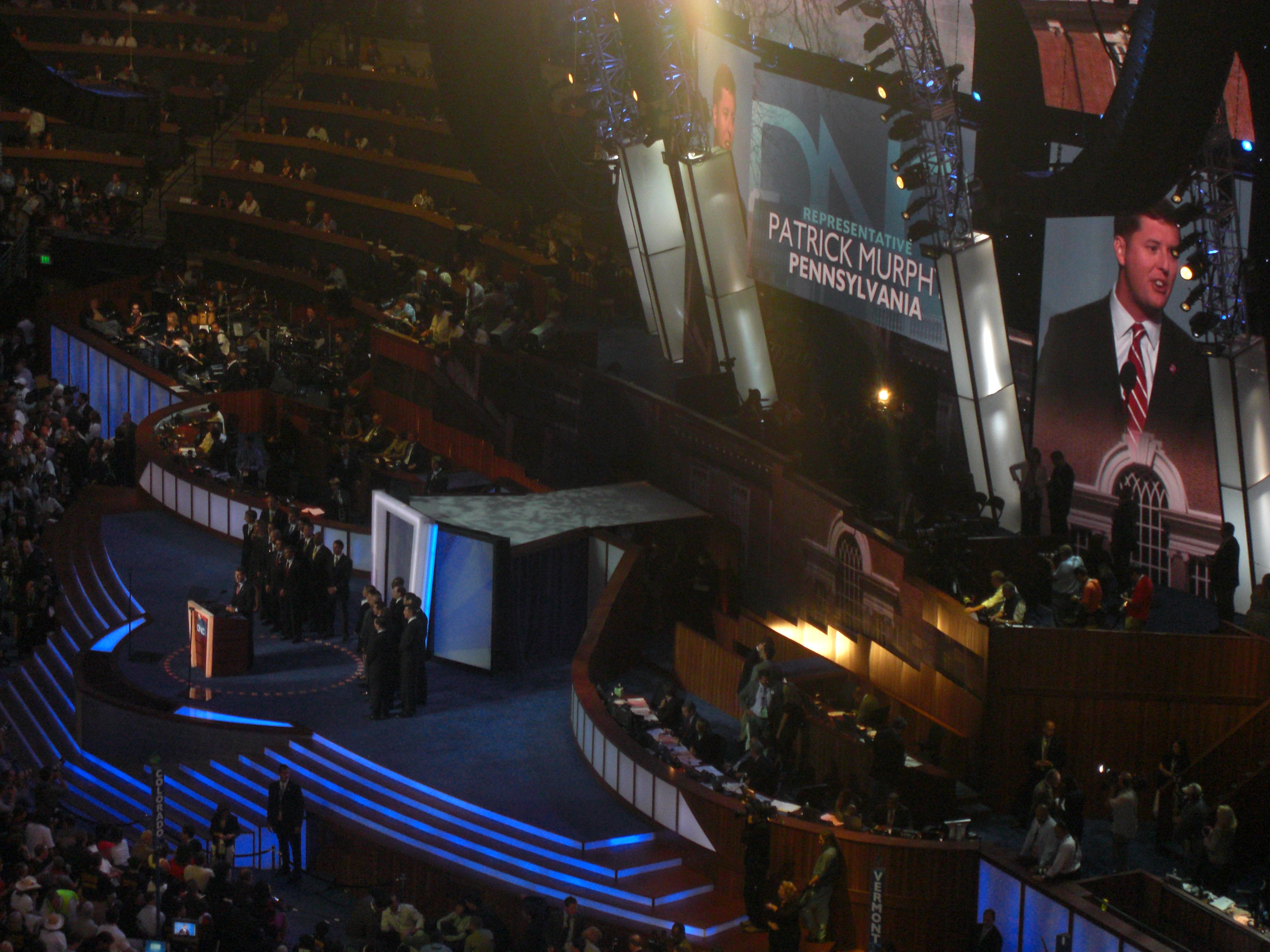
Murphy introduces military veteran candidates for Congress during the third night of the 2008 Democratic National Convention in Denver, Colorado.

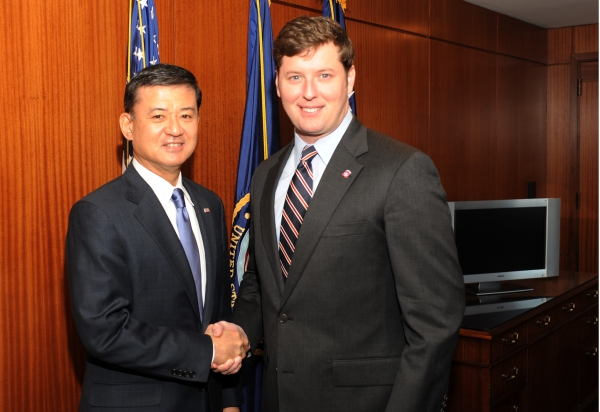
Then Congressman Murphy with Secretary of Veterans Affairs Eric Shinseki

During his time in Congress, Murphy served on the House Armed Services Committee and was on the House Permanent Select Committee on Intelligence; he later became a member of the Appropriations Committee. Murphy was a member of the Blue Dog Coalition, a group of moderate to conservative Democratic representatives. In 2008, he was not only one of the first members of Congress to support then Senator Obama; he was the first to actually campaign for him.

Murphy opposed the Iraq War troop surge of 2007. He was a cosponsor, with Senator Barack Obama and Congressman Mike Thompson (D-CA), of the Iraq War De-Escalation Act of 2007, which aimed to develop a plan to redeploy American troops out of Iraq starting May 1, 2007. The bill was incorporated into the 2008 National Defense Authorization Act, but was vetoed by President George W. Bush.

On February 13, 2008, he was the only member of the House to vote against a resolution congratulating the New York Giants for the team's victory in Super Bowl XLII. "As a former 700-level security guard and lifelong Eagles fan, I couldn't, in good conscience, vote for the New York Giants ... The only thing worse would have been a resolution honoring the Dallas Cowboys", Murphy stated.

In the 2007 congressional vote rankings by the non-partisan National Journal, Murphy scored a 56.5 liberal rating and a 43.5 conservative rating, which is considered "centrist" in the Journal's rankings.

In July 2009, Murphy became the lead advocate for a bill that would repeal the Defense Department's Don't Ask, Don't Tell policy concerning cisgender gay men and cisgender lesbians serving openly in the armed forces.

In 2008 and 2009, Murphy spearheaded an effort to build the Washington Crossing National Cemetery in Bucks County, Pennsylvania, after decades of Congressional inaction. The cemetery officially opened on December 7, 2009.

In April 2010, the IMPROVE act (Improving Medicare Policy for Reimbursements through Oversight and Efficiency) was signed into law. Murphy authored the bi-partisan bill to help eliminate fraud in the health care system and protect taxpayer dollars. The IMPROVE act was endorsed by the AARP, the National District Attorneys Association, the Credit Union National Association, and the American Bankers Association

In May 2010, the Officer Daniel Faulkner Children of Fallen Heroes Scholarship Act of 2010 passed the house. Murphy sponsored the bill which would assist children whose parent or guardian died as a result of performing service as a law enforcement officer, firefighter, or member of a rescue squad or ambulance crew.

=== Voting record ===
==== Abortion ====
Murphy supports abortion rights. He garnered a 100% rating from NARAL and "supported the interests of Planned Parenthood 100 percent in 2008."

==== Consumer protection ====
Murphy authored the Student Credit Card Transparency Act of 2009 which said students can be taken advantage of by credit card companies. The bill accomplished this goal by requiring universities and credit card companies to disclose contracts for student credit cards. Murphy garnered significant praise for his support of the creation of a Consumer Financial Protection Bureau in the face of significant special interest opposition.

Murphy's office worked with the Secret Service to secure hundreds of thousands of dollars for victims of the Bernie Madoff Ponzi scheme. Murphy received national praise for his efforts on behalf of Madoff's victims.

==== Don't Ask Don't Tell ====
Patrick Murphy was a leader in the effort to repeal the military's "Don't ask, don't tell" policy that removed 13,000 service members from the American military for their sexual orientation. Murphy worked tirelessly to convince fellow moderate Democrats to support the issue despite the political risk involved. Murphy was quoted in The Advocate as saying: “I'm a nice guy, but I'm not in this to make friends. I'm in this to make public policy to make our military stronger and keep our families safe at home. We have paratroopers going down in Baghdad who do not have Arabic translators to back them up because Congress 16 years ago didn't have the guts to do what's right. He introduced a bill in the House to repeal Don't Ask, Don't Tell on December 14, 2010.

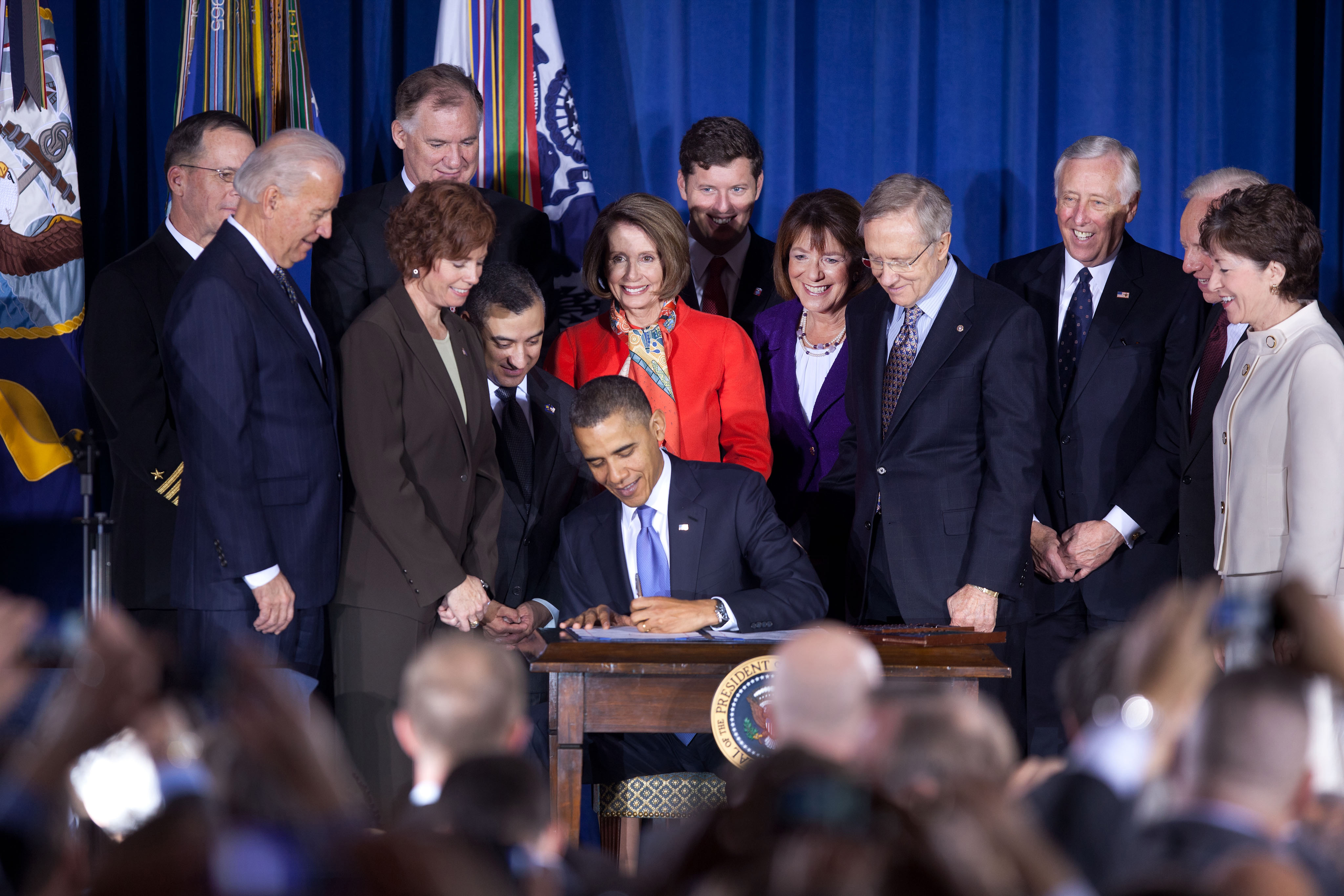
Murphy stands behind President Barack Obama as his signs the repeal of Don't Ask Don't Tell

The bill was approved in a strong bipartisan vote of 250–175 in the House, with the support of 15 House Republicans, including Murphy's home-state colleagues Todd Platts and Charlie Dent.

==== Economy ====
Murphy voted for American Recovery and Reinvestment Act of 2009.

==== Fiscal responsibility ====
In July 2010, the Improper Payments Elimination and Recovery Act was signed into law by President Obama. Congressman Murphy introduced the original bill in 2007, and partnered with Democrats and Republicans alike to get the bill passed. The bill enacted stricter standards among federal agencies to identify improper payments and recover taxpayer dollars that were misspent. By holding government agencies accountable, the law helped eliminate a significant portion of the $98 billion in wasteful government spending each year. The IPERA has cut Medicare errors in half, and has led to the recovery of over $2 billion in overpayments to contractors per year. In total, Murphy's bill has saved taxpayers over $17 billion so far. The OMB projects that the IPERA will save $50 billion over five years.

==== Gun rights ====
Murphy has a permit to carry concealed firearms and considers the right to bear arms is guaranteed by the Second Amendment to the United States Constitution, but with regulation. In 2007, he co-sponsored legislation that would re-authorize a Federal ban on assault weapons.

The following year he signed onto H.R. 861, a bill to establish national concealed-carry reciprocity. Also in 2008, Murphy was an original co-sponsor of legislation that would repeal the District of Columbia's ban on semi-automatic weapons and mandatory handgun registration.

==== Health care ====
Murphy voted for the Affordable Health Care for America Act on November 7, 2009.

Murphy authored the IMPROVE act (Improving Medicare Policy for Reimbursements through Oversight and Efficiency) to help eliminate fraud in the health care system and protect taxpayer dollars. The bill was signed into law in 2010. He co-authored the bill with a fellow Army JAG and congressman, Tom Rooney.

==== Law enforcement ====
Murphy sponsored the Officer Daniel Faulkner Children of Fallen Heroes Scholarship Act of 2010 passed the House. Congressman Patrick Murphy sponsored the bill which would assist children whose parent or guardian died as a result of performing service as a law enforcement officer, firefighter, or member of a rescue squad or ambulance crew.

Murphy voted to keep 150,000 police officers and firefighters on the job after their funding was threatened in 2010. In response to this vote, the President of the Philadelphia-area Fraternal Order of Police said: "It's thanks to Patrick Murphy and this measure that Pennsylvania cops can stay on the job, working to keep families safe"

== Department of the Army ==
Murphy was nominated for the position of Under Secretary of the Army by the President Obama on August 5, 2015. He was confirmed by voice vote on December 18, 2015, and was sworn into the post on January 4, 2016.

Shortly after being sworn in as the Under Secretary of the Army, Murphy assumed the role of Acting Secretary of the Army. Murphy served in the role for five months while Eric Fanning awaited confirmation.

During his tenure as Acting Secretary, Murphy developed a reputation for being a "Soldier's Secretary." He became well known to soldiers for visiting units across the world, participating in physical training sessions, and for engaging them directly via social media and personally written army-wide emails. Murphy often spent holidays with the troops, including serving Thanksgiving dinner to deployed Soldiers in Kuwait. A former paratrooper, Murphy rappelled off of the Fox 29 Building while being interviewed on live television.

Murphy focused on the Army's recruitment failures the previous five years, which helped the Army hit its recruitment goals of 132,000 Generation Z recruits joining the Army in 2016.

As the 32nd Under Secretary of the Army and Acting Secretary of the Army, he led the Army's 1.3 million employees and managed its $148 billion budget.

On January 29, 2016, Murphy issued a formal directive opening all combat arms positions to females. He also doubled the maternity and paternity leave available to troops to 12 weeks and was instrumental in ending the ban on transgender people serving in the Army.

After Fanning's confirmation, Murphy resumed his service as the Under Secretary of the Army.

To better connect active troops and Veterans, Murphy worked with Under Secretary of Defense Peter Levine to allow 18.8 million honorably discharged Veterans to shop online at the Army and Air Force Exchange Service (AAFES). AAFES's analysis projects total exchange sales increasing across of wide range of possibility, from a low of $226 million annually to a high of $1.13. billion This would generate $60 million to $108 million annually in added dividends to support MWR and quality of life programs, without any increase in taxpayer support of base stores.

=== Military Healthcare Executive ===
Murphy adamantly campaigned to fight the stigma within the military associated with seeking mental health treatment. Murphy's key mental health initiative was the development of multidisciplinary behavioral health teams to be embedded into Soldier work areas. The behavioral health teams streamlined mental health services for Soldiers and allowed mental health care providers to form close relationships with deployable unit leaders.

As Secretary, Murphy oversaw the implementation of the world's largest intranet platform - Army Knowledge Online 2.0.

After leaving the Department of the Army, Murphy continued to advise corporations on ways to more efficiently and effectively deliver healthcare services to Veterans. In 2020, Murphy was named Chair of the Government Advisory Board for the Cerner Corporation, facilitating a partnership with the Departments of Defense and Veterans Affairs to modernize their electronic healthcare records. Murphy also serves as a strategic advisor to Northwell Health, the largest health provider for Veterans in New York State aside from the VA, as well Penn Medicine and other healthcare entities.

Murphy joined his former Congress colleague, Patrick Joseph Kennedy, as an original board member of Psych Hub, a mental health care company focusing on connecting people with mental healthcare practitioners.

== Post-political career ==
After being defeated for re-election in November 2010, Murphy became a partner at Philadelphia law firm Fox Rothschild in the litigation department and an adjunct professor at the Widener University School of Law.

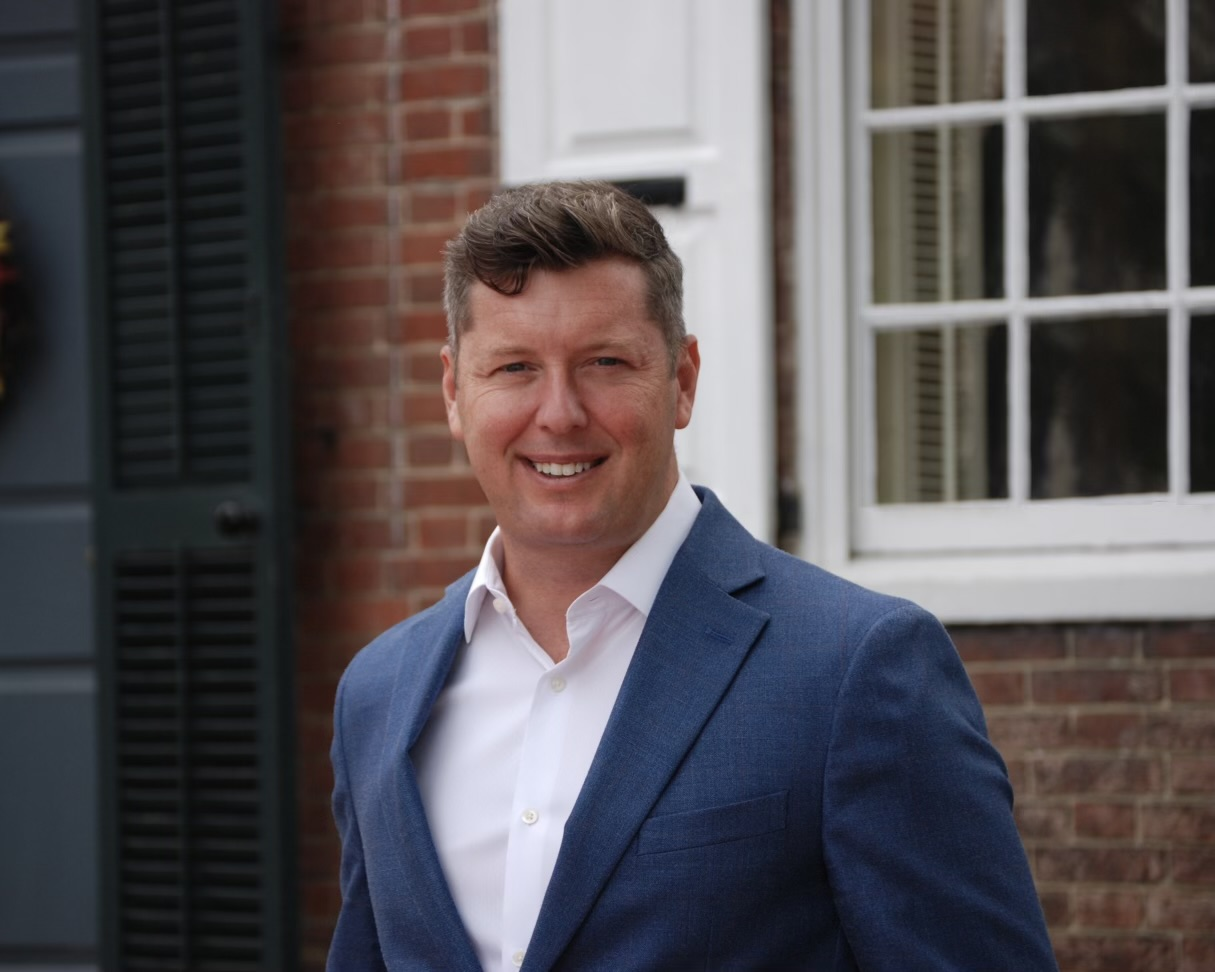
Patrick Murphy, 2022

On April 26, 2011, Murphy was awarded the John F. Kennedy Jr. Award from the Brown University Democrats.

In June 2011, President Obama appointed Murphy to the United States Military Academy's Board of Visitors.

On March 20, 2013, Murphy made his first official appearance as an MSNBC contributor on The Rachel Maddow Show. Murphy served as an expert on American politics, international affairs and military issues.

In 2016, Murphy was among the .1% of ROTC graduates to be inducted into the Army ROTC Hall of Fame, along with Colin Powell, George C. Marshall, Tammy Duckworth and Mark Milley.

Murphy serves on several boards, including the Independence Big Brothers and Big Sisters, the Widener University School of Law National Advisory Board, and he is the vice-chair of the Democratic National Committee Platform Committee.

In 2020, the Student Veterans of America honored Murphy with the Eisenhower Distinguished Public Service Award.

Murphy is on the faculty of the Wharton Business School where he lectures on "Vetrepeneurship."

On February 5, 2024, Murphy endorsed Eugene Vindman in the primary election for Virginia's 7th Congressional District.

His boutique venture capital fund has invested tens of millions of dollars in Veteran-owned companies.

=== Academia ===
Murphy served as a senior national security fellow at the Center For American Progress until his return to government service as Under Secretary of the Army.

Murphy was a fellow with the Institute of Politics at the University of Chicago in Fall 2014. Murphy has served as an adjunct professor of law at Widener University in Pennsylvania, and as a professor of constitutional law at West Point.

Murphy joined the Wharton School of the University of Pennsylvania as a lecturer in 2022.

=== Media ===
Murphy served as the host of Taking The Hill on MSNBC from 2013 to 2015.

Murphy earned an international CLIO Award in October 2014 for his partnership with Grammy Award-winning band Imagine Dragons and the Wounded Warrior Project by highlighting positive veterans stories on their road to recovery on his MSNBC show.

Murphy was featured prominently in the HBO documentary The Strange History of Don't Ask, Don't Tell. Murphy was included for his role in leading the effort to repeal the policy. He was also featured in the Discovery Channel documentary Taking The Hill, which told the story of the 50 veterans of the global war on terrorism who ran for Congress in 2006.

Ben Affleck has credited Murphy for being a major inspiration for his portrayal of the character Stephen Collins in the 2009 movie State of Play.

Murphy served as a military consultant for Thank You for Your Service (2017) and the upcoming Call of Duty film.

Murphy authored an autobiography entitled Taking the Hill: From Philly to Baghdad to the United States Congress; it was published by Henry Holt and Co. (February 19, 2008); ISBN 978-0-8050-8695-9

Murphy earned an Emmy Award for producing a Docuseries highlighting heroic nurses during COVID entitled "Side by Side: A Celebration of Service."

== Personal life ==
Murphy married Jennifer Safford on June 17, 2006, they divorced in 2019. They have two children named Jack and Maggie.

In 2010, Murphy was given the Fenn Award by the John F. Kennedy Presidential Library's New Frontier Award Committee. The award is presented to a distinguished young elected official in honor of Dan Fenn, the Kennedy Library's first director and a former member of President Kennedy's staff.

On May 12, 2015, Murphy was a survivor of the derailment of an Amtrak train in Philadelphia. He suffered minor injuries, and was credited with assisting first responders in rescuing individuals trapped in his car. Several media outlets referred to his actions as "heroic".

U.S. House of Representatives
Preceded by Mike Fitzpatrick	Member of the U.S. House of Representatives from Pennsylvania's 8th congressional district 2007–2011	Succeeded by Mike Fitzpatrick
Political offices
Preceded by Thomas Hawley; Acting	United States Under Secretary of the Army; 2016–2017	Succeeded by Karl Schneider; Acting
Preceded by Eric Fanning; Acting	United States Secretary of the Army; Acting; 2016	Succeeded by Eric Fanning
U.S. order of precedence (ceremonial)
Preceded by Chris Carney as Former U.S. Representative	Order of precedence of the United States as Former U.S. Representative	Succeeded by Joe Sestak as Former U.S. Representative
