= Bucks County Technical High School =

Coordinates: 40.1605°N 74.8529°W

Location
- 610 Wistar Rd, Fairless Hills, PA 19030, United States

Information
- School type: Public
- Established: c. 1958
- Principal: Mr. Joseph Crane
- Staff: 113 (FTE)
- Enrollment: 1,465
- Student to teacher ratio: 13:1
- Colors: Teal and White
- Mascot: Bear
- National ranking: 13,214
- Website: https://www.bcths.com/

Bucks County Technical High School (BCTHS) is a technical high school, a part of the Bucks County School District that allows students to focus on career trades alongside their academic classes. Through this process, they prepare students to find careers after high school. It is located in Fairless Hills, Pennsylvania, in the United States.

== History ==
In 1955, BCTHS was voted to start blueprinting and construction on the property off of Wistar Road. Construction started in 1957. The school was ready to start classes for 600 students by September 1958. After the opening of the school, interest in attending had increased and preparations were made to accommodate the influx of new students. The expansion of the school started in 1964 and was completed in 1965. It has multiple sending districts in Bucks County. These are Yardley Borough, Tullytown Borough, Morrisville Borough, Falls Township, Bensalem Township, Bristol Township and Lower Makefield Township.

In 2017, Bucks County Technical High School discussed possible changes to the amount it receives in funding from the sending districts. At the time, this amount was based on the size and number of students sent by each of the sending districts. The plan suggested by Bucks County Technical High School's Administrative Director Leon Poeske and Neshaminy School District Superintendent Joseph Jones III, was to make the funding only based on the number of seats available for each district, which would cause the amount funded to increase for districts like Bristol, Morrisville, and Bensalem and decrease for districts like Pennsbury, Neshaminy, and Bristol Borough. At the time, the current funding plan was to expire in August 2022, so the districts were meeting frequently to discuss a plan that satisfied each district. There was a new bond being drafted for the technical school that would pay about $30 million for improvements. However, the Pennsbury board President stated they "will not fund a bond if we don't get some sort of change" after feeling the district at been contributing more than they should have in the previous funding plan.

In January 2022, Bucks County Technical High School considered new masking requirements as COVID-19 cases continued to rise within the school. The new requirement would have students wear masks in classrooms in an attempt to limit exposure to the virus and prevent more cases. As of January 20, 2022, the school had a total of 244 cases reported since September 3, 2021. According to the school's Administrative Director, more breakouts would lead to more class cancellations and hybrid learning due to teacher shortages. A decision for the recommendations was voted on Monday, January 24, 2022.

In March 2022, BCTHS eased on mask recommendations as new CDC guidelines suggest. According to these new suggestions, students weren't required to wear masks on school transportation. Because of this and a recent decline of cases in Bucks County, the school adopted these new changes and continued to return to normal routines.

== Class structure ==
Classes at BCTHS are in intervals of six days between technical and academic sides. The academic side focuses on academics such as Mathematics, Science, Social Studies, and Language Arts. Some of these classes offer AP courses, which 8% of students participate in and 5% pass at least one of their exams.

Bucks County Technical High School also offers adult education classes that take place during the day and evening. These are primarily offered by Bucks County Community College and allow for college students to earn credits for the community college through the technical school.

=== Career explore program ===
During the first year at the technical school, students are required to participate in the career explore program, which allows them to become familiar with the different technical shops offered by Bucks County Technical High School. While students are on technical weeks, they will take two days in each program. During this time, the freshmen students are required to wear jeans with no rips, work boots, and a technical shirt to each shop. This process lasts until late February. Once students reach their final four technical shops in the career explore program, they are to choose between the ones they rate as their top five. Depending on their grades in both academic and technical sides, they will have priority on their choices. The better their grades are, the more likely a student is to get their first choice.

=== Co-op opportunities ===
Bucks County Technical High School offers co-op opportunities to students in their junior and senior year. Students can choose to find a job related to their chosen technical field that they can work at for the second half of the day while on their technical rotation. This can be for a company outside the school, or for the school itself. Co-op jobs are approved by the school first before allowing students to participate. During academic portion of a term, a student wouldn't go to work to focus on their studies.

== Technical programs ==
Bucks County Technical High School has five categories for the technical programs. These include Business, Art & Technology; Engineering & Industrial Technology - Construction; Health & Human Services; Engineering & Industrial Technology - Manufacturing; and Engineering & Industrial Technology - Transportation.

- Business, Art & Technology
  - Commercial Art & Illustration
  - Digital Photography & Imaging
  - Entrepreneurship & Small Business Development
  - Graphic Arts & Printing
  - Multimedia Digital Design & Programming
- Engineering & Industrial Technology - Construction
  - Carpentry
  - Civil Engineering Technology
  - Electrical Occupations Technology
  - Facilities Support Services
  - Fine Woodworking
  - Heating, Ventilation, Air Conditioning, & Refrigeration (HVAC)
  - Landscape & Floral Design
  - Plumbing & Heating Technology
- Health & Human Services
  - Allied Health
  - Baking & Pastry Arts
  - Child Development & Early Learning
  - Cosmetology
  - Culinary Arts
  - Dental Health
  - Emergency Services
- Engineering & Industrial Technology - Manufacturing
  - AET: Computer Systems Technology
  - AET: Electronics/Green Energy Technology

In August of 2019, the Green Energy Technology division of Applied Engineering Technology used a portion of BCTHS land as a way to introduce the students to sustainable energy. They were able to power two classrooms from six solar panels and five wind turbines. It is used as a learning opportunity for the students and the community as Bucks County Technical High School uses it as a way to conduct research on what types of sustainable energy are best in Bucks County as well as to answer any questions people in the community may have about it. The project in 2019 costed $40,000 to make, which was supplied through donations from organizations, such as Dow Chemical, who donated half the amount to the school.

  - AET: Mechatronics Technology
  - Machine Technology
  - Welding & Fabrication Technology
- Engineering & Industrial Technology - Transportation
  - Automotive Technology
  - Collision Repair Technology
  - Diesel Technology
  - Outdoor Power Equipment (OPE)
