= Bucks County Board of Commissioners =

Local government body in southeastern Pennsylvania, U.S.

Type
- Type: Unicameral

Leadership
- Board Chair: Diane M. Ellis-Marseglia, Democrat since January 2008
- Vice Chair: Robert J. Harvie Jr., Democrat since January 2020
- Minority Leader: Gene DiGirolamo, Republican since January 2020

Structure
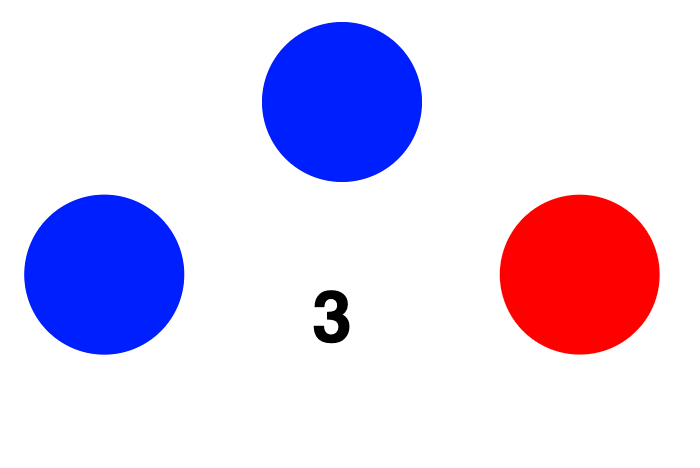
- Seats: 3
- Political groups: Majority; Democratic (2): Minority; Republican (1)

Elections
- Voting system: First-past-the-post
- Last election: November 7, 2023

Meeting place
- Bucks County Administration Building, Doylestown, Pennsylvania

The Bucks County Board of Commissioners is the legislative council and executive arm of Bucks County, Pennsylvania. Currently, it has 3 members.

Members of the Board of Commissioners are tasked with managing the county's budget, oversight of almost 2,400 full-time employees, and various county departments.

The current chair is Diane M. Ellis-Marseglia, a Democrat. The Democratic Party holds a 2–1 majority over the Republican Party on the board.

== Members ==
There are three members of the Board of Commissioners, who are elected to serve four-year terms. If there is a vacancy, the County Judges may appoint a replacement.

Holder	Party	Position
Diane M. Ellis-Marseglia	Democratic	Board Chair
Robert J. Harvie Jr.	Democratic	Vice Chair
Gene DiGirolamo	Republican	Secretary
