= Fairless Hills, Pennsylvania =

Unincorporated community in Pennsylvania, US

Fairless Hills
- Census-designated place
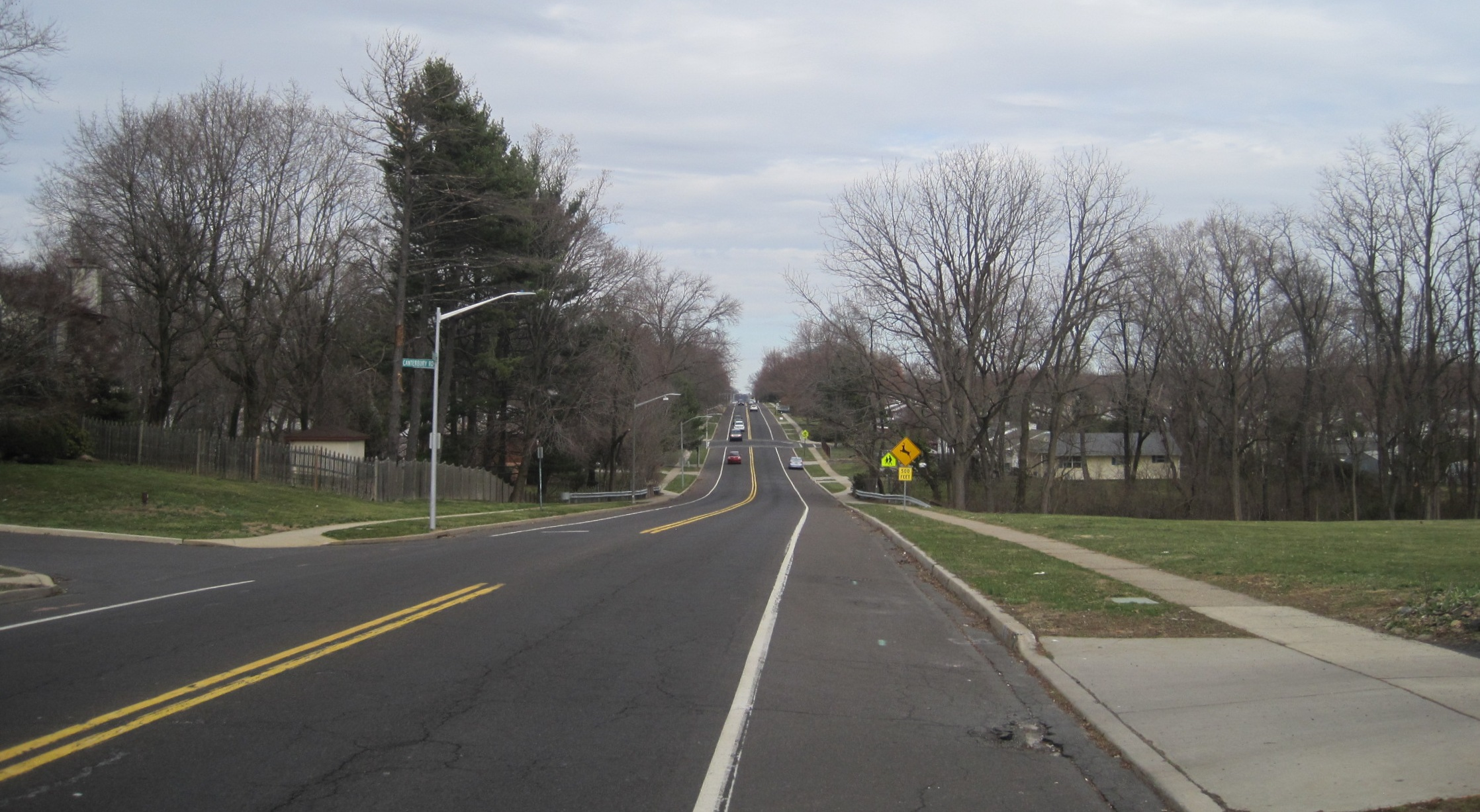
- Intersection of Trenton Road and Canterbury Road

- Location of Fairless Hills in Pennsylvania Fairless Hills (the United States)
- Coordinates: 40°10′44″N 74°51′11″W
- Country: United States
- State: Pennsylvania
- County: Bucks
- Township: Falls Township

Area
  - Total: 1.96 sq mi (5.07 km^{2})
  - Land: 1.94 sq mi (5.03 km^{2})
  - Water: 0.012 sq mi (0.03 km^{2})
- Elevation: 108 ft (33 m)

Population (2020)
  - Total: 9,041
  - Density: 4,651.6/sq mi (1,795.98/km^{2})
- Time zone: UTC-5 (EST)
  - Summer (DST): UTC-4 (EDT)
- ZIP Code: 19030
- Area codes: 215, 267 and 445
- FIPS code: 42-24712

Fairless Hills is a census-designated place (CDP) in Bucks County, Pennsylvania, United States. The CDP is located within Falls Township. The population was 9,046 at the 2020 census. That is up from 8,466 at the 2010 census.

== History ==
Fairless Hills as it is known today began in 1951, when developer Danherst Corporation began erecting prefabricated homes built by Gunnison Magichomes, Inc. Gunnison was a wholly owned subsidiary of U.S. Steel. The development was financed by U.S. Steel with a loan of $50 million. It was named in honor of Benjamin Fairless, then president of U.S. Steel, which operated the "Fairless Works" plant that employed most of Fairless Hills' homeowners at the time.

The Sotcher Farmhouse was listed on the National Register of Historic Places in 1977.

== Geography ==
Fairless Hills is located at 40°10′44″N 74°51′11″W (40.178909, -74.853044).

According to the United States Census Bureau, the CDP has a total area of 1.9 square miles (4.9 km^{2}), of which 0.52% is water. Its climate is humid subtropical (Cfa). Average monthly temperatures range from 32.3 °F in January to 76.8 °F in July. The local hardiness zone is 7a.

Some later developers of Fairless Hills designated several sections, or neighborhoods, such as Heddington, Drexelwood, and Fairbridge North.

== Demographics ==
Historical population
Census	Pop.	Note	%±
1990	9,026		—
2000	8,365		−7.3%
2010	8,466		1.2%
2020	9,041		6.8%

As of the 2010 census, Fairless Hills was 85.2% White, 3.7% Black or African American, 0.1% Native American, 5.6% Asian, 0.1% some other race, and 1.6% were two or more races. 3.6% were of Hispanic or Latino ancestry. 8.4% of the population were foreign-born.

As of the 2000 census, there were 3,220 households, out of which 33.0% had children under the age of 18 living with them, 54.0% were married couples living together, 11.8% had a female householder with no husband present, and 29.8% were non-families. 25.9% of all households were made up of individuals, and 11.2% had someone living alone who was 65 years of age or older. The average household size was 2.59 and the average family size was 3.15.

In the CDP, the population was spread out, with 24.8% under the age of 18, 7.1% from 18 to 24, 31.2% from 25 to 44, 22.5% from 45 to 64, and 14.3% who were 65 years of age or older. The median age was 37 years. For every 100 females, there were 90.8 males. For every 100 women age 18 and over, there were 88.2 men.

The median income for a household in the CDP was $45,424, and the median income for a family was $57,190. Men had a median income of $38,767 versus $31,519 for women. The per capita income for the CDP was $21,111. About 2.7% of families and 5.6% of the population were below the poverty line, including 4.9% of those under age 18 and 8.0% of those age 65 or over.
