= 1926 Pennsylvania gubernatorial election =

- November 2, 1926
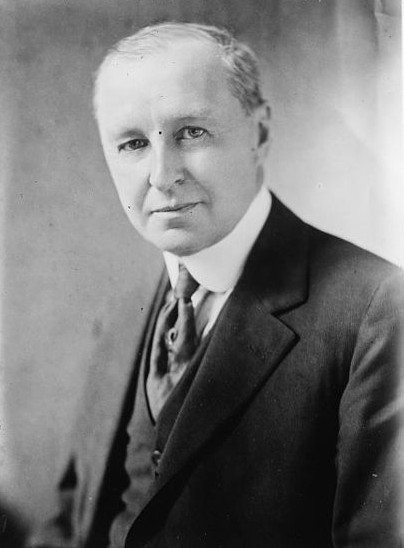

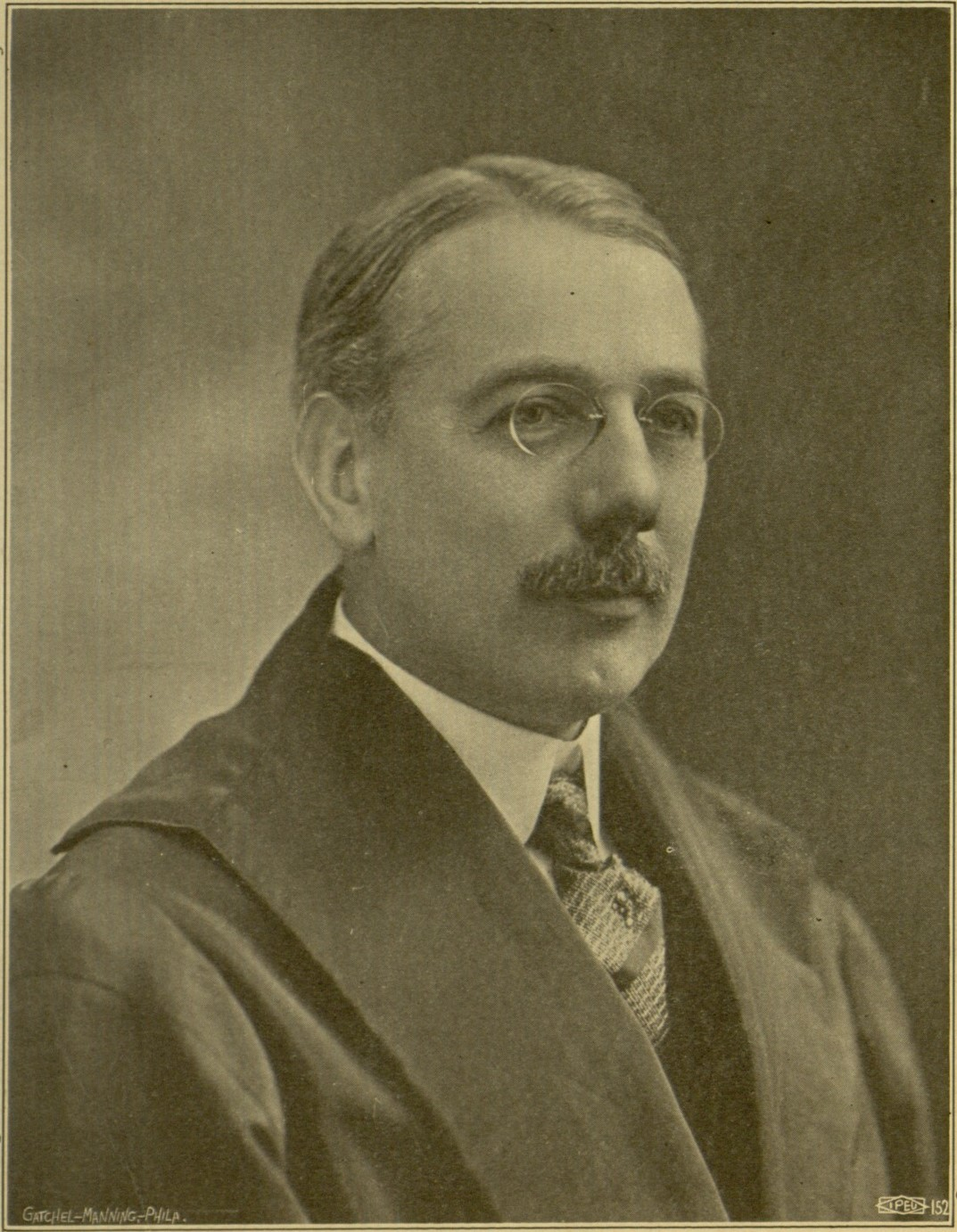
Nominee	John Fisher	Eugene C. Bonniwell
Party	Republican	Democratic
Popular vote	1,102,823	365,280
Percentage	73.35%	24.29%
- County results Fisher: 40–50% 50–60% 60–70% 70–80% 80–90% Bonniwell: 40–50%
Governor before election
Gifford Pinchot
Republican
Elected Governor
John Fisher
Republican

The 1926 Pennsylvania gubernatorial election occurred on November 2, 1926. Republican incumbent Gifford Pinchot was term-limited and constitutionally ineligible for a second consecutive term in office. Former banking commissioner John Fisher defeated Democratic judge Eugene C. Bonniwell to become governor of Pennsylvania.

Edward E. Beidleman, Thomas Wharton Phillips Jr., and John K. Tener unsuccessfully sought the Republican nomination.

== Republican primary ==
=== Candidates ===
- Edward E. Beidleman, former state senator from Harrisburg and lieutenant governor of Pennsylvania
- John Stuchell Fisher, former state banking commissioner
- Thomas W. Phillips Jr., U.S. representative from Butler
- John K. Tener, former governor

=== Results ===
Republican primary results Fisher: 40%–50%; 50%–60%; 60%–70%; 70%–80%; 80%–90%; Beidleman: 40%–50%; 50%–60%; 60%–70%; 70%–80%; Phillips: 40%–50%

Pennsylvania gubernatorial Republican primary election, 1926
Party	Candidate	Votes	%
Republican	John Stuchell Fisher	652,944	46.11
Republican	Edward E. Beidleman	634,521	44.81
Republican	Thomas W. Phillips Jr.	76,230	5.38
Republican	John K. Tener	52,272	3.69
Write-in		40	0.00
Total votes		1,416,007	100.00

== Democratic primary ==
=== Candidates ===
- Eugene C. Bonniwell, judge of the Philadelphia Municipal Court and nominee in 1918
- William E. E. Porter
- Samuel E. Shull, nominee in the 1922 United States Senate election

=== Results ===
Democratic primary results Bonniwell: 30%–40%; 40%–50%; 50%–60%; 60%–70%; Shull: 30%–40%; 40%–50%; 50%–60%; 60%–70%; 70%–80%; 90%–100%; Porter: 30%–40%; 40%–50%; 50%–60%; 60%–70%; 70%–80%; 80%–90% 90%–100%

Pennsylvania gubernatorial Democratic primary election, 1926
Party	Candidate	Votes	%
Democratic	Eugene C. Bonniwell	62,302	35.77
Democratic	Samuel E. Shull	61,692	35.42
Democratic	William E. E. Porter	48,877	28.06
Write-in		1,313	0.75
Total votes		174,184	100.00

== Prohibition primary ==
=== Candidates ===
- John Stuchell Fisher, former state banking commissioner (Note: Ran for the Republican Party nomination)
- George L. Pennock

=== Results ===
Pennsylvania gubernatorial Prohibition primary election, 1926
Party	Candidate	Votes	%
Prohibition	George L. Pennock	3,445	68.93
Prohibition	John Stuchell Fisher	1,289	25.79
Write-in		264	5.28
Total votes		4,998	100.00

== General election ==
=== Candidates ===
- Eugene C. Bonniwell, judge of the Philadelphia Municipal Court and nominee in 1918 (Democratic)
- Julian P. Hickok (Commonwealth Land)
- H. W. Hicks (Workers)
- John Stuchell Fisher, former state banking commissioner (Republican)
- George L. Pennock (Prohibition)
- John W. Slayton, labor organizer and perennial candidate (Socialist)

=== Results ===
Pennsylvania gubernatorial election, 1926
Party	Candidate	Votes	%
Republican	John Stuchell Fisher	1,102,823	73.35
Democratic	Eugene C. Bonniwell	365,280	24.29
Prohibition	George L. Pennock	19,524	1.30
Socialist	John W. Slayton	11,795	0.78
Workers	H. W. Hicks	3,256	0.22
Commonwealth Land	Julian P. Hickok	922	0.06
N/A	Others	68	0.01
Totals		1,503,600	100.00%
