= 1930 Pennsylvania gubernatorial election =

- November 4, 1930
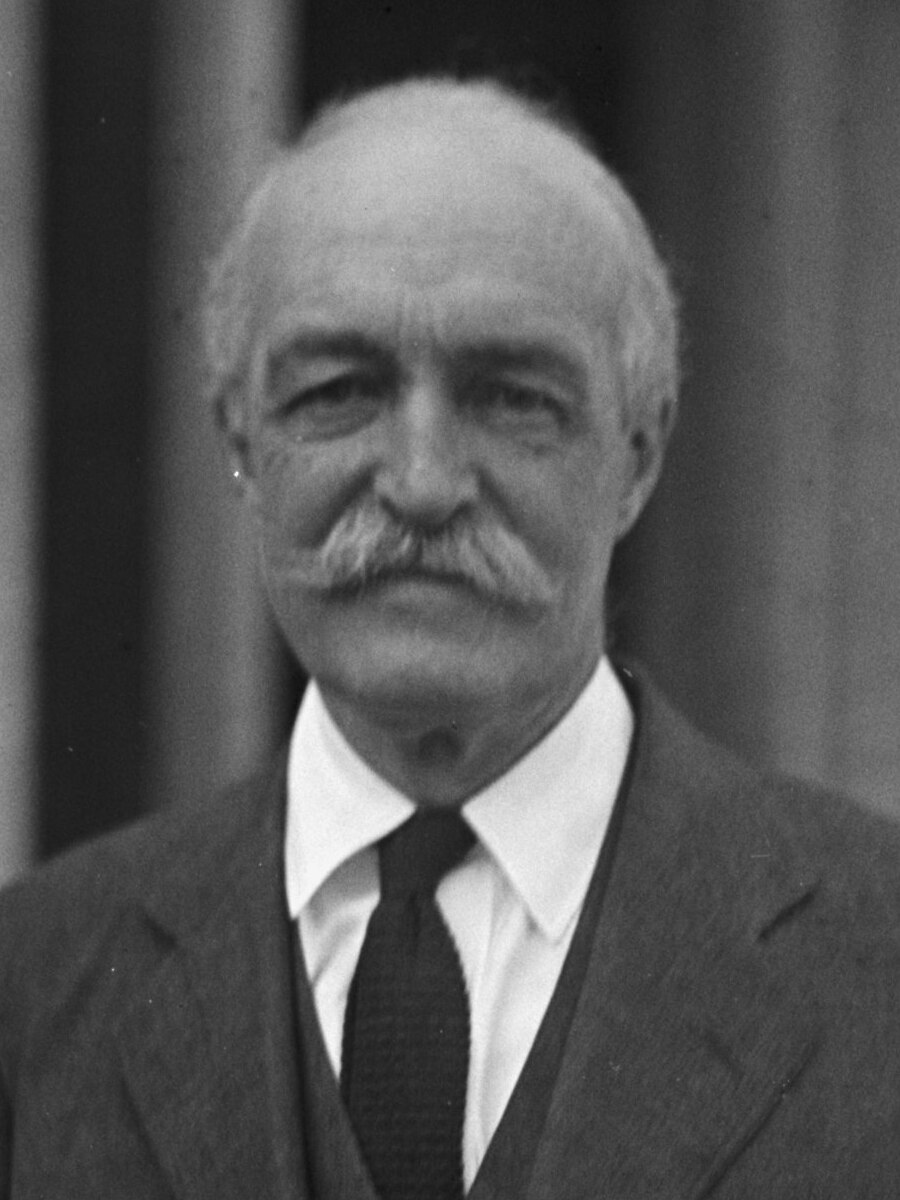

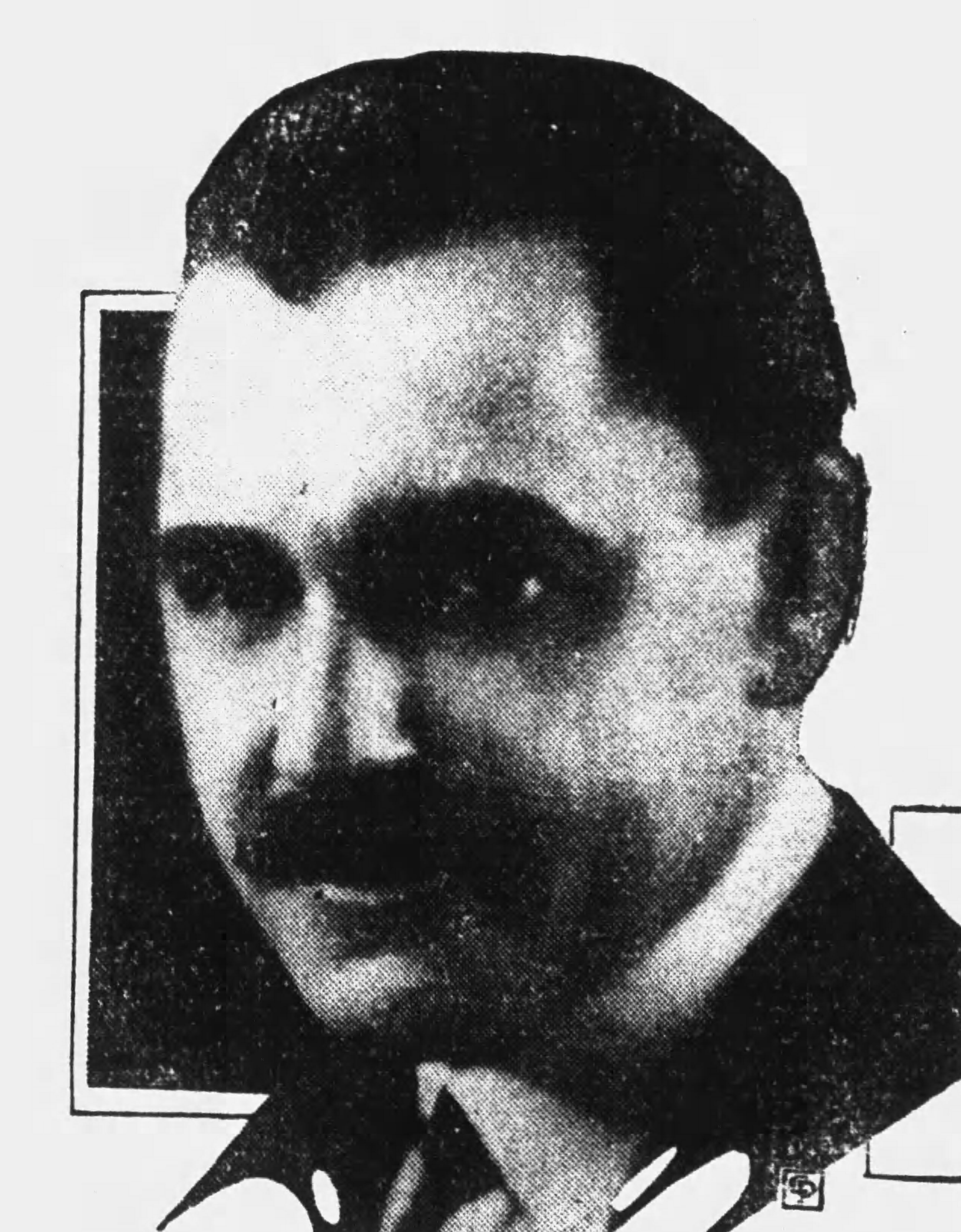
Nominee	Gifford Pinchot	John M. Hemphill
Party	Republican	Democratic
Alliance	Prohibition	Liberal
Popular vote	1,068,874	1,010,204
Percentage	50.77%	47.98%
- County results Pinchot: 50–60% 60–70% 70–80% 80–90% Hemphill: 50–60% 60–70% 70–80%
Governor before election
John Fisher
Republican
Elected Governor
Gifford Pinchot
Republican

The 1930 Pennsylvania gubernatorial election occurred on November 4, 1930. Incumbent Republican governor John Stuchell Fisher was not a candidate for re-election. Republican candidate and former governor Gifford Pinchot defeated Democratic candidate John M. Hemphill to win a second, non-consecutive term as Governor of Pennsylvania.

This was the only election from 1863 until 1950 in which the Democratic candidate carried the city and county of Philadelphia, which was controlled by a powerful Republican political machine during that time. Hemphill won the city in a landslide with the support of Philadelphia Republican boss William Scott Vare, who abandoned Pinchot over his refusal to certify Vare's election as United States Senator in 1926. Hemphill won 226,811 votes on the Liberal Party line in Philadelphia, nearly twice the vote he received on the Democratic ticket.

After Pinchot's election, Vare was ousted as party boss.

== Background ==
=== 1926 United States Senate election ===
In 1926, Gifford Pinchot (then Governor of Pennsylvania) and William Scott Vare (U.S. Representative and boss of the powerful Philadelphia political machine) both challenged incumbent United States Senator George W. Pepper in the Republican primary. Pepper carried nearly every county in the state, but Vare won the race narrowly, thanks to a 224,000 vote margin in Philadelphia County. Vare went on to win the general election by a wider margin, again relying on a large margin from Philadelphia.

Pinchot, acting in his role as governor, declined to certify the results of Vare's election. After a year-long review of the contested election, the Senate voted 58–22 not to seat Vare on the grounds that he had fraudulently and extravagantly financed his campaign against Pepper. During the lengthy investigation, Vare suffered a stroke brought on by stress.

== Republican primary ==
=== Candidates ===
- Francis Shunk Brown, former Pennsylvania Attorney General (1915–19)
- Joseph D. Herben, Philadelphia resident
- Thomas Wharton Phillips Jr., former U.S. Representative from Butler (1923–27) and candidate in 1926
- Gifford Pinchot, former Governor (1923–27)

==== Withdrew ====
- Samuel S. Lewis, former Treasurer and Auditor General
- J. Ambler Williams, Norristown judge

=== Campaign ===
To avenge his defeat in 1926, Vare and Philadelphia leaders were able to recruit Francis Shunk Brown, the former state Attorney General, to run in the primary against Pinchot. The dominant issue in the campaign was the prohibition of alcohol and Volstead Act, which set the terms of its enforcement, and a third candidate, former Representative Thomas Wharton Phillips Jr., ran the second of three campaigns for governor on an aggressive anti-prohibition platform. Brown, though privately opposed to the Volstead Act, could not openly support its repeal given his ties to the Philadelphia machine and President Herbert Hoover. Instead, he called for a state referendum on the modification of the Act, a lukewarm position in contrast to that of Pinchot, an ardent prohibitionist. However, Pinchot's previous term as Governor had been noted for a relatively permissive enforcement of prohibition laws, so some moderates were drawn to his campaign. Republican National Committeeman W. W. Atterbury, president of the Pennsylvania Railroad and a Brown supporter, unsuccessfully worked to have Representative Phillips withdraw in an effort to unify the anti-prohibition campaign behind a single candidate.

Shortly before the April 1 filing deadline, Samuel S. Lewis dropped out of the race. He had been running on an anti-machine ticket with interim Senator Joseph R. Grundy, who did not replace him. A second candidate, Norristown judge J. Ambler Williams, who had run on a "bone-dry" prohibitionist platform, dropped out on April 7.

Race also came into the campaign in April. Joseph D. Herben, who filed a last-minute campaign to run on a "Negro ticket," was invited by the Pennsylvania League of Women Voters to an open discussion of Republican issues. Though Pinchot, Phillips, and Grundy agreed to participate, Brown declined, stating, "I refuse to discuss state politics on the same platform with a Negro."

=== Results ===
Republican primary results Pinchot: 30%–40%; 40%–50%; 50%–60%; 60%–70%; 70%–80%; 80%–90%; Brown: 40%–50%; 50%–60%; Phillips: 40%–50%

1930 Republican Party gubernatorial primary
Party	Candidate	Votes	%
Republican	Gifford Pinchot	632,719	41.23
Republican	Francis Shunk Brown	612,620	39.92
Republican	Thomas W. Phillips Jr.	281,399	18.34
Republican	Joseph D. Herben	7,896	0.51
Write-in		23	0.00
Total votes		1,534,657	100.00

== Democratic nomination ==
On February 25, 1930, the Democratic state executive committee selected Lawrence H. Rupp as their candidate for Governor. Rupp, who was being considered for the position of Grand Exalted Ruler of the Benevolent and Protective Order of Elks, chose to withdraw from the gubernatorial race in March to campaign for the Elks leadership instead. W. C. Bamrbrick who was the committee's choice for Lieutenant Governor of Pennsylvania, also declined the nomination. On March 24, 1930, the executive committee selected John M. Hemphill for Governor and Guy K. Bard for Lieutenant Governor.

== General election ==
=== Candidates ===
- John M. Hemphill (Democratic and Liberal)
- James H. Maurer (Socialist)
- Frank Mozer (Communist)
- Gifford Pinchot, former Governor (Republican and Prohibition)

=== Results ===
1930 Pennsylvania gubernatorial election
Party	Candidate	Votes	%	±%
Republican	Gifford Pinchot	1,068,874	50.77	
Democratic	John M. Hemphill	1,010,204	47.98	
Socialist	James H. Maurer	21,036	1.00	
Communist	Frank Mozer	5,267	0.25	
Write-in		64	0.00	
Total votes		2,105,381	100.00	
