= Eugene C. Bonniwell =

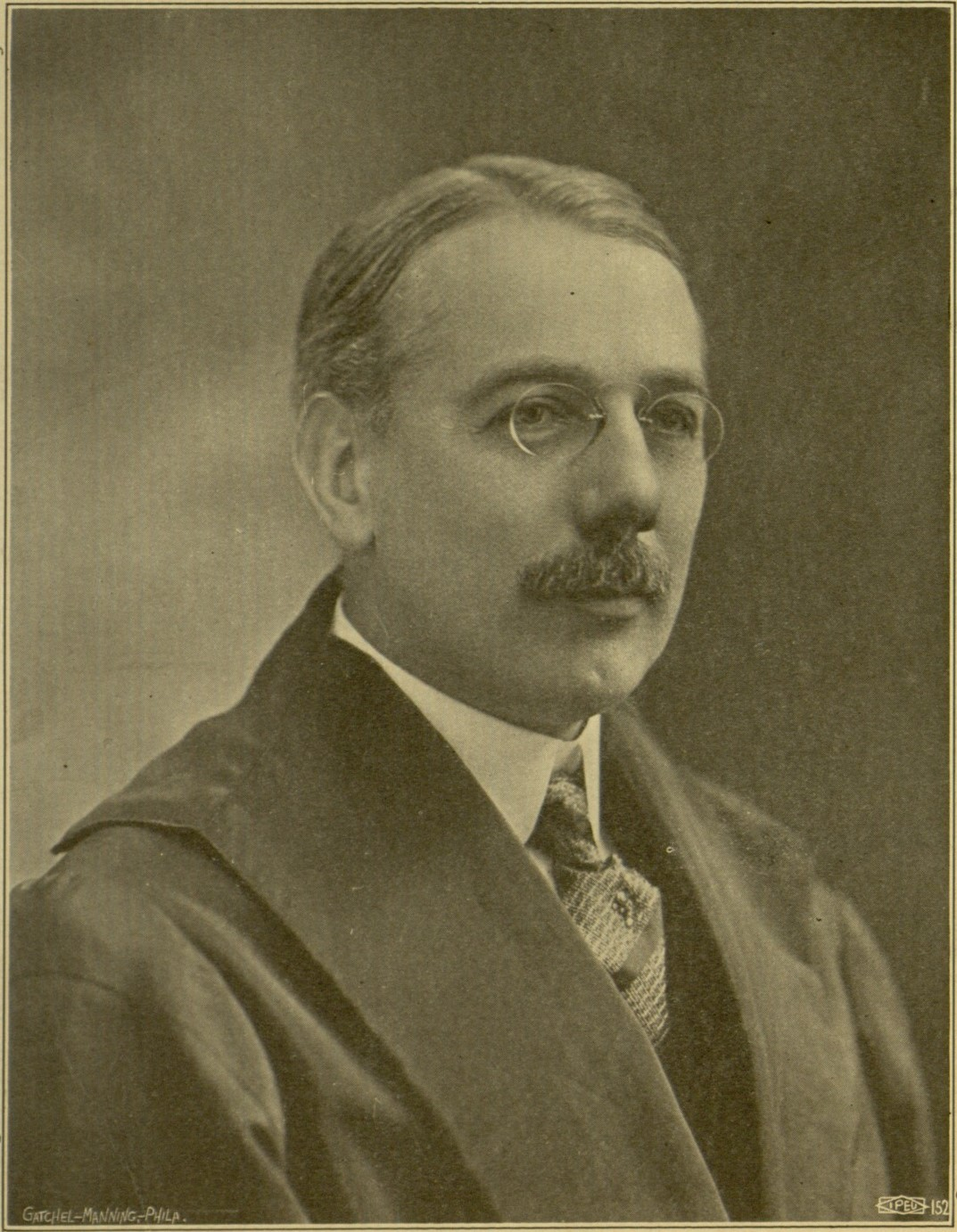

Eugene C. Bonniwell (September 25, 1872 – June 4, 1964) was an American jurist, politician, and athletic official who was a judge on the Philadelphia Municipal Court, Democratic nominee for Governor of Pennsylvania in 1918 and 1926, and officer of the Amateur Athletic Union.

== Personal life ==
Bonniwell was born in Philadelphia on September 25, 1872 to Evander Berry and Elizabeth (Doherty) Bonniwell. He attended the University of Pennsylvania, where he was a pole vaulter and distance runner. On June 5, 1900, he married Madeleine Helene Cahill. They had seven children. Madeleine Bonniwell died in 1929. On August 28, 1934, he married Roberta Curry Ranck, a gymnast 30 years his junior. The ceremony was performed in Church of St. Vincent Ferrer by Bonniwell's brother Rev. William J. Bonniwell.

Bonniwell was a member of the Knights of Columbus, Sons of the Revolution, and the Friendly Sons of St. Patrick, chancellor general Sons of the American Revolution, chairman of the Pennsylvania Commission for Irish Independence, and president of the Firemen's Association of Pennsylvania.

== Career ==
Bonniwell studied law in the office of S. Edwin Megaree and graduated from the University of Pennsylvania Law School in 1898. In 1910, he earned a Doctor of Philosophy degree from Villanova University.

Bonniwell played a leading role in the founding of the Keystone Party. During the 1910 elections, he was chairman of the committee to prevent fraud at the polls. He was an unsuccessful candidate for the United States House of Representatives in 1910 and 1912. During the 1912 campaign, a fake Knights of Columbus oath, alleging the organization's members pledged to "wage relentless war, secretly and openly, against all heretics, Protestants and Masons and to extirpate them from the face of the earth", was circulated to discredit Bonniwell. The oath was later recirculated during the 1960 United States presidential election to smear John F. Kennedy.

In 1912, he was appointed an assistant city solicitor of Philadelphia by Michael J. Ryan and assigned to cases in the dissension court. Bonniwell managed Ryan's unsuccessful campaign for the Democratic nomination in the 1914 Pennsylvania gubernatorial election.

Bonniwell was elected a judge of the Philadelphia Municipal Court in 1913. During his tenure, Bonniwell, was known for dismissing juries that acquitted suspects he felt were guilty, declared Prohibition unconstitutional, freed accused whom he believed told the truth, and held private trials for cases involving young girls to prevent them from being leered at.

In 1916 United States Senate election, Bonniwell was the candidate of the "Old Guard" Democrats who opposed the policies of A. Mitchell Palmer. He lost the Democratic primary to Ellis L. Orvis by 9,170 votes.

Bonniwell was a last minute candidate in the 1918 Democratic gubernatorial primary, running as a "wet" candidate against Joseph F. Guffey, a supporter of prohibition. Bonniwell was the first Catholic to run for governor of Pennsylvania. His supporters formed the Fair Play Party and made him their nominee for Governor. He defeated Guffey 78,208 votes to 65,876. On September 7, 1918, Palmer accused Bonniwell of receiving financial support from liquor distributors and the Republican Party and demanded he withdraw from the race. As a result, the Democratic state committee refused to endorse Bonniwell's campaign. He lost the general election to Republican William Cameron Sproul 552,537 votes to 305,315.

In 1921, Bonniwell was a write-in candidate for the Supreme Court of Pennsylvania. He won the Democratic primary, but lost the general election to Republican incumbent William I. Schaffer. In 1924, Bonniwell unsuccessfully challenged Guffey to become Pennsylvania's Democratic national committeeman. Later that year, Bonniwell ran for the state party chairmanship, but lost to John H. Bigelow.

In 1926, Bonniwell once again ran for governor. He won the Democratic primary, a three-way contest between himself, Samuel E. Shull, and William E. E. Porter, by only 610 votes. In the general election, he ran as a moderate wet against ardent dry John Stuchell Fisher. As Pennsylvania was a strong Republican state, Bonniwell was seen as a longshot. He lost the general election by over 700,000 votes.

During the 1930 Pennsylvania gubernatorial election, Bonniwell broke with his party and supported Republican Gifford Pinchot. It was believed that Bonniwell would join the Republican Party, but he remained in the Democratic Party, stating that he was "still a Democrat and I probably will be until they throw me out". Bonniwell was a Democratic candidate in the 1934 Pennsylvania gubernatorial election, but finished a distant third in the primary.

== Athletics ==
Bonniwell was a national vice president of the Amateur Athletic Association and served 10 consecutive terms as president of the Middle Atlantic A.A.U. He also served as president of the Veteran Athletes of Philadelphia. The Eugene C. Bonniwell National Football Trophy of America was presented in the United States to the college football team recognized as national champions by the directors of the Veteran Athletes of Philadelphia. During the 1940s, he formed a basketball team with his five sons.

== Later life and death ==
Bonniwell retired from the bench in 1953 and served as clerk and librarian of the municipal court until March 1964. He died on June 4, 1964 at the age of 91.

Party political offices
Preceded by Vance C. McCormick; John A. McSparran	Democratic nominee for Governor of Pennsylvania; 1918; 1926	Succeeded by John A. McSparran; John M. Hemphill
