= David J. Davis =

American politician and military officer (1870–1942)

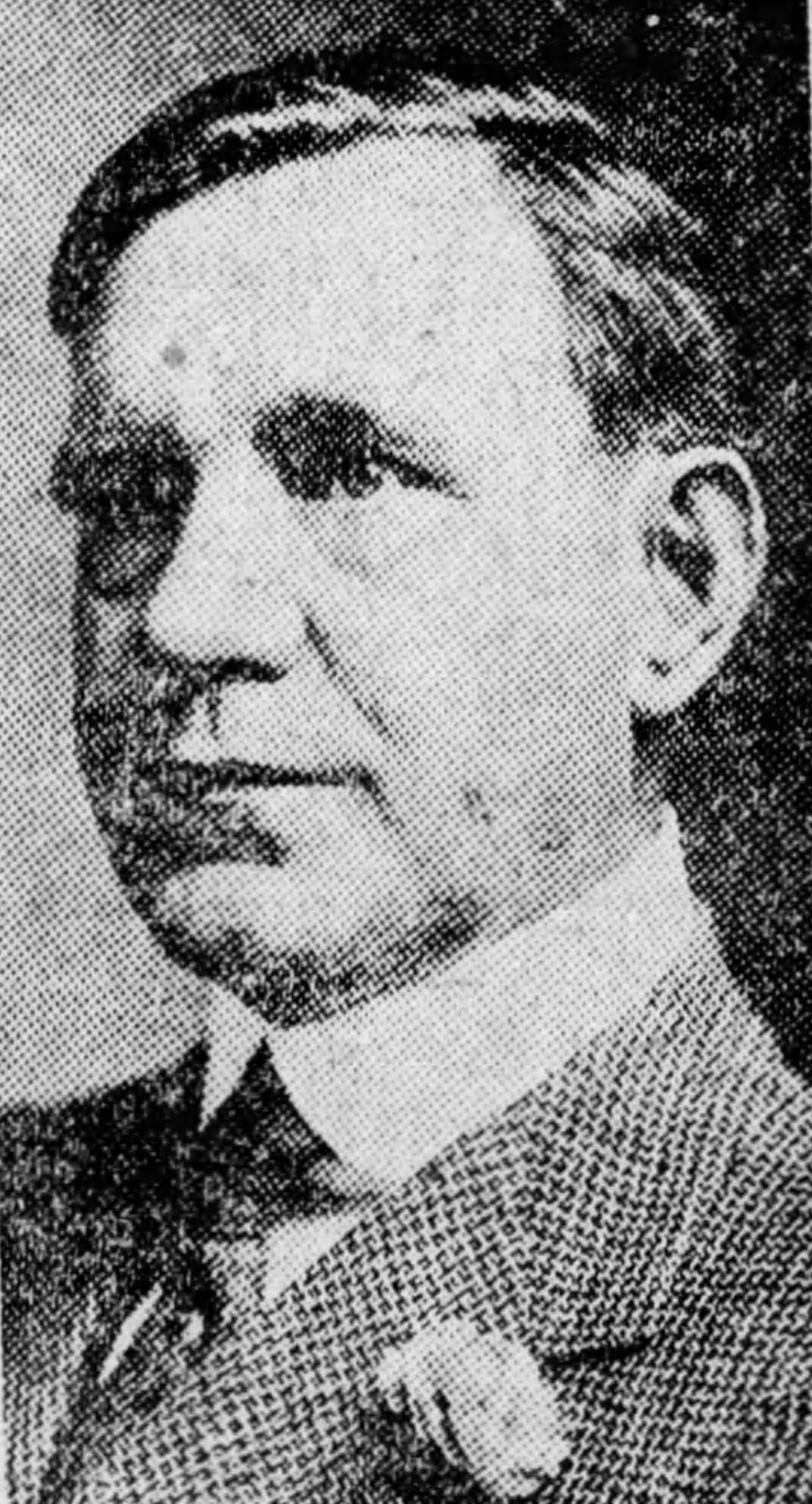

13th Lieutenant Governor of Pennsylvania
- In office January 20, 1923 – January 18, 1927
- Governor: Gifford Pinchot
- Preceded by: Edward Beidleman
- Succeeded by: Arthur James

Personal details
- Born: November 22, 1870 Scranton, Pennsylvania, US
- Died: November 19, 1942 (aged 71) Scranton, Pennsylvania
- Party: Republican
- Occupation: Politician, military officer

David J. Davis (November 22, 1870 – November 19, 1942) was an American politician and military officer who served as the 13th lieutenant governor of Pennsylvania from 1923 to 1927. Davis was a member of the Republican Party.

== Life and career ==
Davis was born and raised in Scranton, Pennsylvania. He enlisted in the United States Army in 1894, gained a commission as first lieutenant during the Spanish–American War, and deployed to the US-Mexico border in 1916. He entered World War I as a lieutenant colonel and rose to prominence by serving on the staff of General John J. Pershing and as adjutant, colonel, and chief of staff of the 28th Infantry Division. After the war, he became one of the original directors of the American Legion.

Davis served as the 13th Lieutenant Governor of Pennsylvania from 1923 to 1927 under Governor Gifford Pinchot. Following his service as lieutenant governor, Davis served for twenty years as the solicitor of Scranton and, from 1932 through 1935, he served as the adjutant general in command of the Pennsylvania National Guard. He died in Scranton at the age of 71.

Political offices
Preceded by Edward Beidleman	Lieutenant Governor of Pennsylvania; 1923–1927	Succeeded by Arthur James
Party political offices
Preceded by Edward Beidleman	Republican nominee for Lieutenant Governor of Pennsylvania; 1922	Succeeded by Arthur James
