= 1928 Socialist National Convention =

- 1928 presidential election
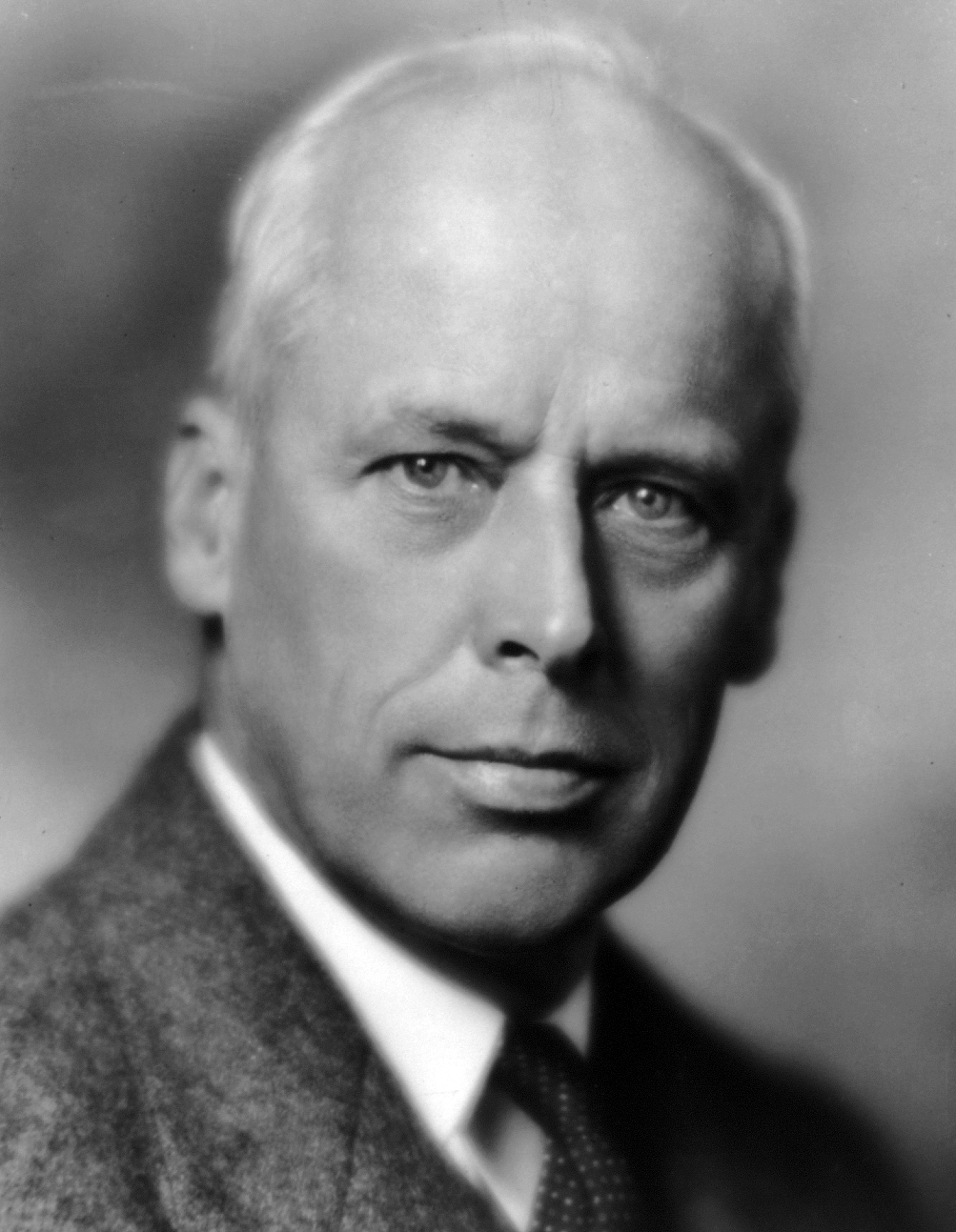
- Nominees (Thomas & Maurer)

Convention
- Dates: April 13–17, 1928
- City: Manhattan, New York City, New York
- Venue: Finnish Socialist Hall

Candidates
- Presidential nominee: Norman Thomas of New York
- Vice-presidential nominee: James H. Maurer of Pennsylvania
- Results (president): unanimous
- Results (vice president): unanimous
- Ballots: 1

The 1928 Socialist National Convention was held April 13-17, 1928, in New York City. It saw the Socialist Party of America nominate Norman Thomas for president and James H. Maurer for vice president.

== Logistics ==
Held in the Finnish Socialist Hall in New York City, it was held April 13–17, 1928 as the presidential nominating convention of the Socialist Party of America Convention.

== Nominations ==
James Maurer, a former State Representative, President of the Pennsylvania Federation of Labor and then Councilman for the city of Reading, was widely considered the frontrunner for the presidential nomination in the months prior to the convention. However, Maurer insisted that his duties as councilman precluded the possibility of any national tour that would be required of his nomination for the presidency, and this definitively declined to be a candidate for the presidential nomination on April 10. Norman Thomas, a Presbyterian minister who had been one of Maurer's boomers and had himself made it known that he was not a candidate for the Socialist nomination, rather swiftly became the new frontrunner. The day that Maurer definitively ruled out a run, efforts were mate to draft Thomas for the presidential nomination.

Thomas and Maurer were nominated unanimously for president and vice president respectively, with both men accepting their nominations.

== Platform ==
The only significant disagreement in writing the platform arose on the question of Prohibition. There remained a split in the party between those who supported the Eighteenth Amendment and those, like Convention Chair Victor L. Berger, who preferred that the party's position in the matter be handled on a state-by-state basis. In the end it was agreed that the party remain silent on the issue of Prohibition.

== Other party business ==
The convention voted to approve changes to the party constitution which were later ratified by general membership in a referendum. The changes included removing references to "class struggle" from the wording of the party's membership application; setting annual party dues at $1 (while permitting state organizations to set them higher for members in their state); and moving the party away from holding midterm-year national conventions (as it had done in 1926, thanks to a rule change at the 1924 convention) and back to only holding regularly-scheduled national conventions in presidential election years.
