= Beidleman =

Beidleman is a surname. Notable people with the surname include:

- Edward E. Beidleman (1873–1929), American politician
- Neal Beidleman (born 1960), American mountaineer and climbing guide
