= William G. Price Jr. =

United States Army general

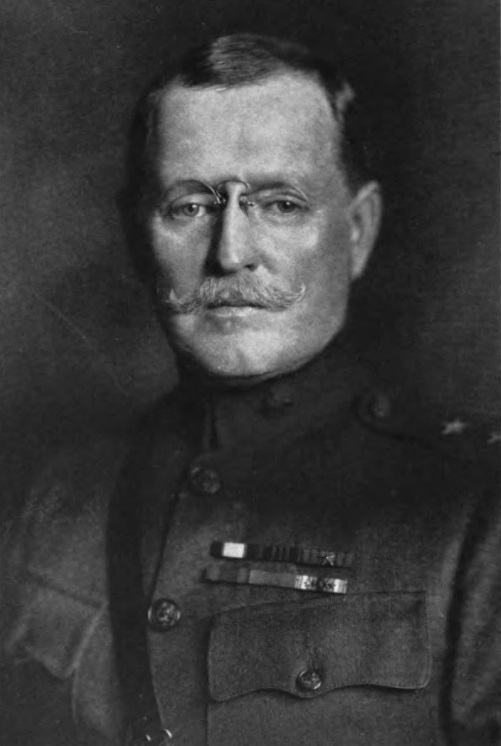
- From Volume 2 of 1921's Pennsylvania in the World War.
- Born: May 23, 1869; Chester, Pennsylvania
- Died: February 24, 1960 (aged 90) Philadelphia, Pennsylvania
- Buried: Chester Rural Cemetery; Chester, Pennsylvania
- Allegiance: United States
- Branch: United States Army (Pennsylvania National Guard)
- Service years: 1886–1933
- Rank: Major General (Army); Lieutenant General (National Guard, retired list)
- Commands: 3rd Infantry Regiment, 1st Brigade, 28th Division; 1st Infantry Brigade, 28th Division; 53rd Field Artillery Brigade, 28th Division; 28th Infantry Division
- Conflicts: Spanish–American War; Pancho Villa Expedition; World War I
- Awards: Army Distinguished Service Medal; French Croix de Guerre (with palms); French Legion of Honor; Belgian Croix de Guerre

William G. Price Jr. (May 23, 1869 – February 24, 1960) was a businessman and Pennsylvania National Guard officer. He commanded the 28th Infantry Division for 13 years between World War I and World War II.

== Early life ==
William Gray Price Jr. was born in Chester, Pennsylvania on May 23, 1869, the son of William Gray Price and Jane Campbell Price. He was educated in both public and private schools in Chester, and in 1887 began his career as a clerk with the Delaware County Trust and Title Insurance Company. He left the company in 1893, and formed his own real estate development venture while residing in Philadelphia. Price's company specialized in residential construction, and built homes and apartment houses in the Chester, Philadelphia, and Pittsburgh areas.

== Start of military career ==
Price joined the National Guard in 1886, enlisting as a private in Company B, 6th Infantry Regiment. He was promoted to corporal in 1889, and then applied for an officer's commission. In 1891 he was commissioned as a second lieutenant, and in 1892 he was promoted to first lieutenant. In 1893, Price was assigned as adjutant of the 3rd Infantry Regiment, and subsequently received promotion to captain. In 1895, he was promoted to major, and in 1898 he was named second in command of the 3rd Regiment with the rank of lieutenant colonel. During the Spanish–American War, Price's regiment was mobilized for service in Cuba; they completed training and arrived at the Tampa, Florida embarkation point, but the war ended before they could board their transport ships.

== Continued military career ==
In 1901, Price was promoted to command of the 3rd Infantry Regiment with the rank of colonel after winning an election held by the other officers in the regiment. In 1910 he was selected to command the Pennsylvania National Guard's 1st Brigade, and promoted to brigadier general. In 1916–1917, Price led his brigade and other Pennsylvania National Guard volunteers during their service on the Texas-Mexico border during the Pancho Villa Expedition.

== World War I ==
When the Pennsylvania National Guard's 28th Division was federalized for service in World War I, Price volunteered for overseas duty. In August 1917, he was appointed to command the division's 53rd Field Artillery Brigade, which he led throughout the war, including support to the 28th and 91st Divisions during the Hundred Days Offensive. Price received the Army Distinguished Service Medal, the French Croix de Guerre (with palms) and Legion of Honor, and the Belgian Croix de Guerre.

After the war, Price was one of the founders of the American Legion, and presided over its organizing convention. He later headed the Pennsylvania Battlefield Commission, a committee appointed by the governor to determine the location for the 28th Division's World War I memorial. Price's committee ultimately selected a site in Varennes-en-Argonne, where a permanent monument was constructed; the commission also oversaw the emplacement of additional monuments and memorials in Pennsylvania and in France.

== Post-World War I ==
In 1919, Price was promoted to major general and appointed as commander of the Pennsylvania National Guard. In this capacity, he worked with the state adjutant general to re-form the organization following its wartime mobilization, including implementing new tables of organization and equipment, fielding updated vehicles, weapons, and equipment, recruiting new soldiers, and appointing officers to leadership positions.

In 1920, the reorganized 28th Infantry Division was federally recognized by the War Department as a ready unit. Price was appointed as its commander, and continued to serve as a major general. During his command of the division, Price was credited with selecting Fort Indiantown Gap as the Pennsylvania National Guard's primary training site, and overseeing its construction.

== Retirement ==
Price retired in April, 1933; he was succeeded in command by Edward C. Shannon. In June 1941, Price was one of the founders of France Forever, an organization of French men and women living in the United States during World War II, which was created to provide support to the war effort in France and England. Price resided in Ridley Park, and in 1949 he was honored at a large celebration in commemoration of his 80th birthday; Governor James H. Duff presented him with the Pennsylvania Distinguished Service Medal. In 1955, Governor George M. Leader presented Price with a state promotion to lieutenant general at a ceremony during the Pennsylvania National Guard's second week of annual training.

== Death and burial ==
Price died at Naval Hospital Philadelphia on February 24, 1960. He was buried at Chester Rural Cemetery in Chester.

== Legacy ==
Price was a longtime member of the board of trustees at Valley Forge Military Academy. In January, 1960 the school began construction on a new gymnasium, which was named Price Hall in Price's honor.

== Family ==
In 1903, Price married Sallie Pennell Eyre. Their children included four sons and three daughters: Joshua, William G., Terrill, William A., Martha, Virginia, Elizabeth, and Sarah. William G. Price III was born and died in 1894.

== Sources ==
=== Books ===
- Ashmead, Henry Graham (1907). Descendants of Joseph and Mary Dodge Campbell in America. Chester, PA: Chester Times Print. pp. 65–66.
- Price, William G. (1919). Activities and Citations of the 53rd Field Artillery Brigade. Chester, PA: Chester Times. pp. 3–4.
- United States House of Representatives Committee on Foreign Affairs (1922). American Battle Monuments Commission Hearings. US Government Printing Office: Washington, DC. p. 64.
- Winter, Thomas Daniel (January 30, 1941). The Spirit of France Still Lives: Extension of Remarks in the House of Representatives. Washington, DC: U.S. Government Printing Office.

=== Newspapers ===
- "Colonel William G. Price to Command the Third". Philadelphia Inquirer. Philadelphia, PA. April 24, 1901. p. 7.
- "Shannon to Head Guards: Succeeds William G. Price, Jr., with Rank of Major-General". The Evening News. Wilkes-Barre, PA. March 22, 1933. p. 1.
- Hayes, George (March 28, 1949). "Military, Civic Leaders Pay Stirring Tribute to Gen. Price in Weekend Parade, Banquet". Delaware County Times. Chester, PA. pp. 1, 17.
- Byer, Gene (March 16, 1953). "Gen. Wm. G. Price Jr. Recalls American Legion's Founding". Delaware County Times. Chester, PA. p. 13.
- "Third Star is Pinned on Price by Gov. Leader". Delaware County Times. Chester, PA. August 22, 1955. p. 18.
- "Named for General". Delaware County Times. Chester, PA. January 11, 1960. p. 25.
- "Gen. Price Dies; Former Head of PNG". The Daily Republican. Monongahela, PA. United Press International. February 25, 1960. p. 5.

=== Internet ===
- "France Forever: France Quand Même" (PDF). Maison Francaise.org. New York, NY: Columbia University. 1941.

Military offices
Preceded by Charles Henry Muir	Commanding General of the 28th Infantry Division; 1920–1933	Succeeded by Edward C. Shannon
