= 1922 Pennsylvania gubernatorial election =

- November 7, 1922
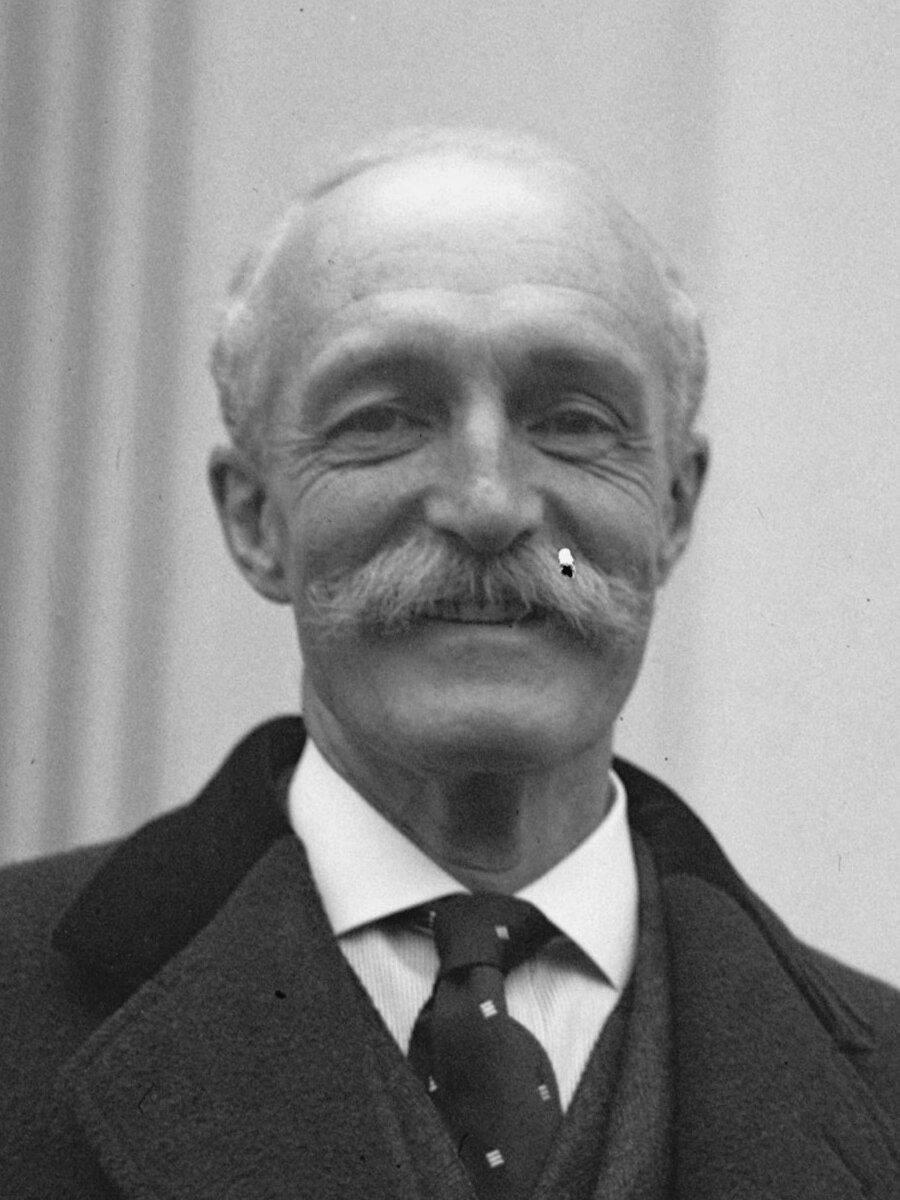

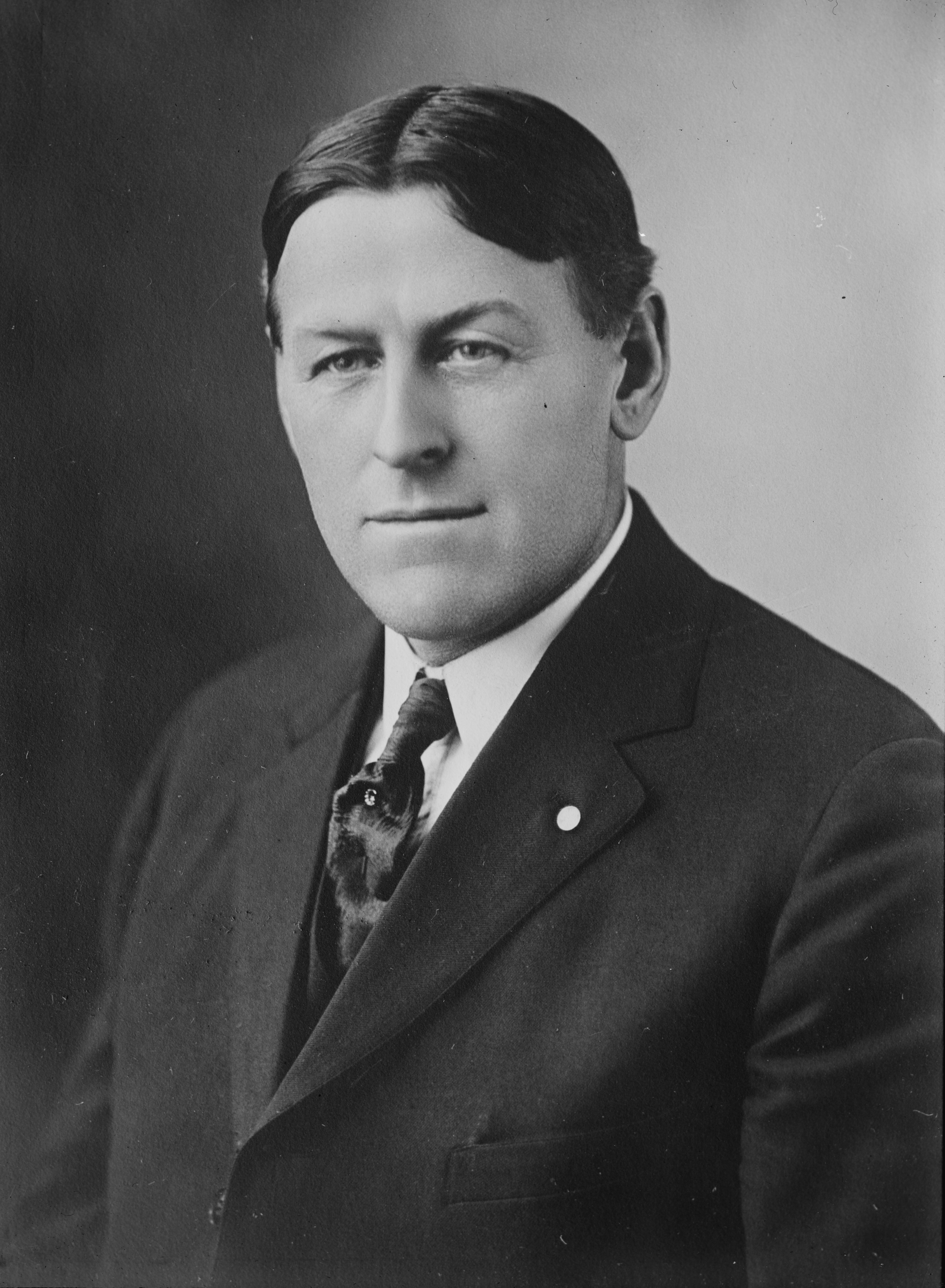
Nominee	Gifford Pinchot	John A. McSparran
Party	Republican	Democratic
Popular vote	831,696	581,625
Percentage	56.79%	39.71%
- County results Pinchot: 40–50% 50–60% 60–70% 70–80% McSparran: 40–50% 50–60% 60–70%
Governor before election
William Sproul
Republican
Elected Governor
Gifford Pinchot
Republican

The 1922 Pennsylvania gubernatorial election occurred on November 7, 1922. Incumbent Republican governor William Sproul was not a candidate for re-election. Republican candidate Gifford Pinchot defeated Democratic candidate John A. McSparran to become Governor of Pennsylvania. John Stuchell Fisher unsuccessfully sought the Republican nomination.

== Democratic primary ==
=== Candidates ===
- John A. McSparran
- Robert E. Pattison Jr., son of former Pennsylvania governor Robert E. Pattison

=== Results ===
Democratic primary results McSparran: 50%–60%; 60%–70%; 70%–80%; 90%–100%

Pennsylvania gubernatorial Democratic primary election, 1922
Party	Candidate	Votes	%
Democratic	John A. McSparran	151,087	67.60
Democratic	Robert E. Pattison Jr.	72,423	32.40
Total votes		223,510	100.00

== Republican primary ==
=== Candidates ===
- George E. Alter, incumbent Pennsylvania attorney general
- Frank P. Croft
- John Stuchell Fisher, incumbent State Commissioner of Banking
- John Clinton Parker
- Gifford Pinchot, former chief of the United States Forest Service

=== Results ===
Republican primary results Pinchot: 50%–60%; 60%–70%; 70%–80%; 80%–90%; 90%–100%; Alter: 40%–50%; 50%–60%; 60%–70%

Pennsylvania gubernatorial Republican primary election, 1922
Party	Candidate	Votes	%
Republican	Gifford Pinchot	511,377	48.79
Republican	George E. Alter	502,118	47.91
Republican	Frank P. Croft	16,484	1.57
Republican	John Stuchell Fisher	9,431	0.90
Republican	John Clinton Parker	8,702	0.83
Total votes		1,048,112	100.00

== Prohibition primary ==
=== Candidates ===
- Gifford Pinchot, former chief of the United States Forest Service (Note: Ran for the Republican Party nomination)
- William Repp

=== Results ===
Pennsylvania gubernatorial Prohibition primary election, 1922
Party	Candidate	Votes	%
Prohibition	William Repp	4,931	68.77
Prohibition	Gifford Pinchot	1,807	25.20
Write-in		432	6.03
Total votes		7,170	100.00

== Socialist primary ==
=== Candidates ===
- Gifford Pinchot, former chief of the United States Forest Service (Note: Ran for the Republican Party nomination)
- Lilith Martin Wilson

=== Results ===
Pennsylvania gubernatorial Socialist primary election, 1922
Party	Candidate	Votes	%
Socialist	Lilith Martin Wilson	601	38.75
Socialist	Gifford Pinchot	581	37.46
Write-in		369	23.79
Total votes		1,551	100.00

== Results ==
Pennsylvania gubernatorial election, 1922
Party	Candidate	Votes	%
Republican	Gifford Pinchot	831,696	56.79
Democratic	John A. McSparran	581,625	39.71
Socialist	Lilith Martin Wilson	31,748	2.17
Prohibition	William Repp	14,151	0.97
Industrialist	William H. Thomas	3,137	0.21
Single Tax	John W. Dix	2,246	0.15
N/A	Others	69	0.00
Totals		1,464,603	100.00%
