= Lawrence H. Rupp =

Lawrence Henry Rupp (September 26, 1881 – April 29, 1936) was an American attorney who was Grand Exalted Ruler of the Benevolent and Protective Order of Elks from 1930 to 1931 and was the Democratic nominee in the 1932 United States Senate election in Pennsylvania.

== Early life ==
Rupp was born in New Tripoli, Pennsylvania to Alvin and Ellen M. Rupp. His father was a schoolteacher who later served as superintendent of public instruction in Lehigh County, Pennsylvania for 25 years. Rupp graduated from Allentown High School in 1897 and Muhlenberg College in 1902. He was admitted to the bar in 1905 and began practicing in Allentown, Pennsylvania. In 1913, he formed the firm Butz and Rupp in with Reuben J. Butz.

On November 27, 1907, Rupp married Maude Estelle Berlin. They had one son, Lawrence Jr. Maude Rupp died in 1931 and, two years later, Rupp married Florence Kohl.

== Politics ==
Rupp was elected district attorney of Lehigh County in 1911 and took office on January 1, 1912. He received largest majority given a Democrat in Lehigh County to that point. He served as DA for four years and did not seek reelection. From 1918 to 1920, Rupp was chairman of the Democratic state committee.

In 1920, Rupp, backed by A. Mitchell Palmer-wing of the party, sought the Democratic nomination for United States Senate. He was opposed by Major John A. Farrell, a World War I veteran and the candidate of the Eugene C. Bonniwell supporters. Farrell narrowly defeated Rupp in the Democratic primary, then lost the general election by a wide margin.

In 1930, the Democratic state executive committee selected Rupp was their candidate for Governor of Pennsylvania. He was also sought by the Lehigh Democratic organization to run for the United States House of Representatives, but chose to run for Governor. He withdrew from the race in March to campaign for Grand Exalted Ruler of the Elks instead.

In 1932, Rupp once again ran for a seat in the U.S. Senate. He defeated Lewis C. Cassidy in the Democratic primary by a 2 to 1 margin. In the general election, Rupp lost a close race to incumbent James J. Davis, who was one of only six Republicans to win in the 1932 United States Senate elections.

== Elks ==
Rupp was a member of the Allentown Lodge of the Benevolent and Protective Order of Elks. He was president of the Pennsylvania State Elks Association in 1919 and served on the judiciary committee of the Grand Lodge. He became an honorary life member in 1922. In 1930, he was elected Grand Exalted Ruler of the Elks.

== Death ==
Rupp died at his home in Allentown on April 29, 1936, after an illness of six months.

Party political offices
Preceded by Sedgwick Kistler	Democratic nominee for U.S. Senator from Pennsylvania (Class 1); 1932	Succeeded by George Howard Earle III
