= 1932 United States Senate election in Pennsylvania =

- November 8, 1932
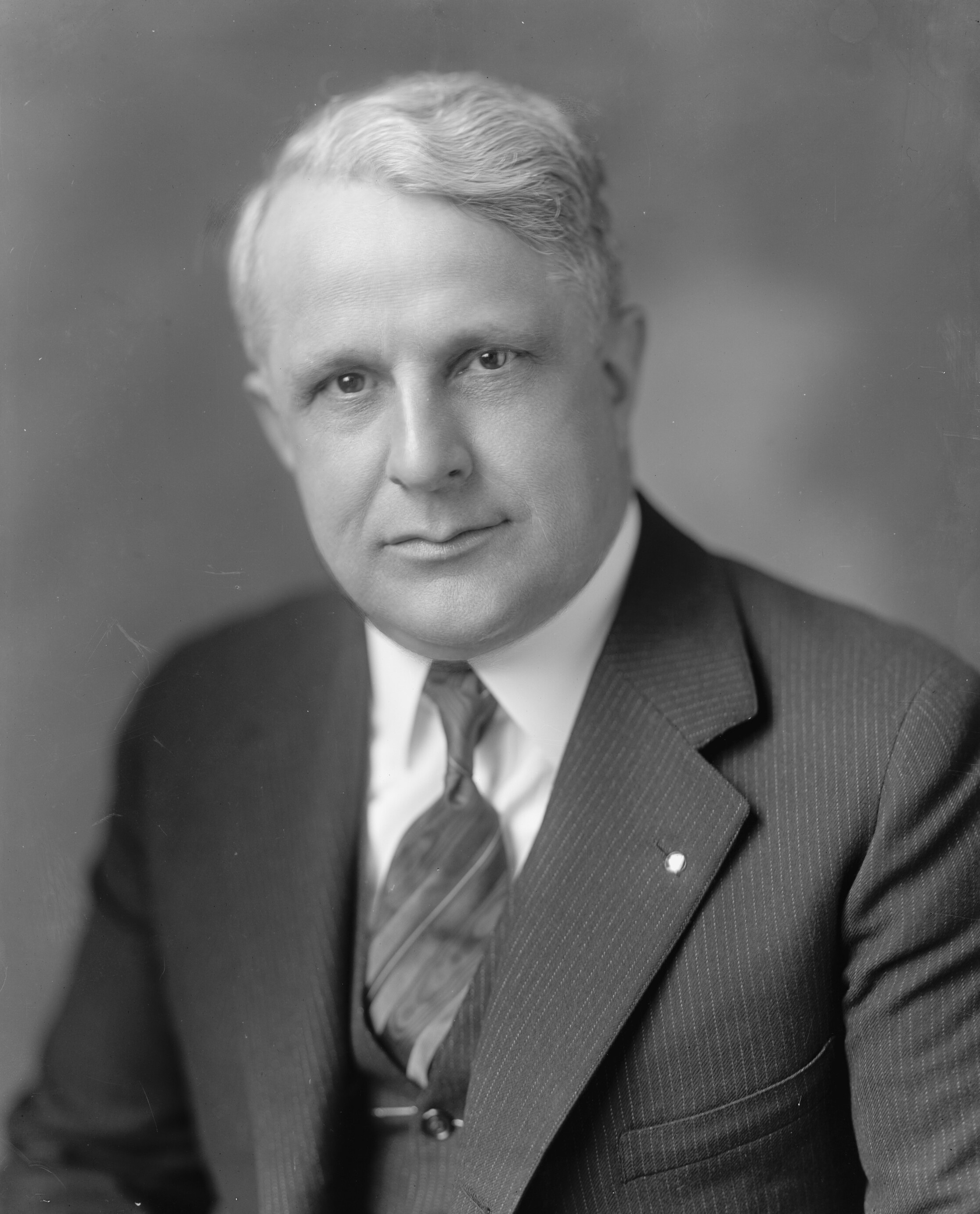

Nominee	James J. Davis	Lawrence H. Rupp
Party	Republican	Democratic
Popular vote	1,375,489	1,200,760
Percentage	49.46%	43.18%
- County results Davis: 30–40% 40–50% 50–60% 60–70% Rupp: 30–40% 40–50% 50–60% 60–70%
U.S. senator before election
James J. Davis
Republican
Elected U.S. Senator
James J. Davis
Republican

The 1932 United States Senate election in Pennsylvania was held on November 8, 1932. Incumbent Republican U.S. Senator James J. Davis successfully sought re-election, defeating Democratic nominee Lawrence H. Rupp.

== General election ==
=== Candidates ===
- James J. Davis, incumbent U.S. Senator (Republican)
- Edwin J. Fithian (Prohibition)
- Lawrence H. Rupp, Grand Exalted Ruler of the Benevolent and Protective Order of Elks. Former chairman of the Democratic state committee and district attorney of Lehigh County (Democratic)
- Harry M. Wicks (Communist)

=== Results ===
General election results
Party	Candidate	Votes	%	±%
Republican	James J. Davis (incumbent)	1,375,489	49.46%	
Democratic	Lawrence H. Rupp	1,200,760	43.18%	
Prohibition	Edwin J. Fithian	106,602	3.83%	
Socialist	William J. Van Essen	91,456	3.29%	
Communist	Harry M. Wicks	6,426	0.23%	
N/A	Others	145	0.01%	

== See also ==
- United States Senate elections, 1932 and 1933
