= Birch Wilson =

American political activist and civil servant

Birch Wilson as he appeared around the time of American entry into World War I in 1917.

L. Birch Wilson Jr. (1883–1974) was an American political activist, newspaper editor, and civic employee. Wilson is best remembered as a member of the governing National Executive Committee of the Socialist Party of America during the 1920s and the éminence grise behind the Socialist mayoral administration of J. Henry Stump in the city of Reading, Pennsylvania as well as the editor of the Reading weekly newspaper, The Labor Advocate. His wife, Lilith Martin Wilson (1887–1937), was a three term member of the Pennsylvania General Assembly during the decade of the 1930s.

== Biography ==
=== Early years ===
L. Birch Wilson Jr., publicly known by his middle name, was born February 7, 1883, in Reading, Pennsylvania, at that time a small city of about 45,000 people located in the Southeastern part of the state. Wilson's father was an iron molder and the working-class family's financial means were limited. Wilson was educated in the local public school system but was forced to drop out after completing just one year of high school. Wilson continued to read after leaving school, however, becoming a self-educated person.

After leaving school, Wilson worked as an apprentice sign painter, working 60 hours a week for 5 cents an hour, payable at the end of one year. When the year was completed, Wilson was abruptly fired and a new apprentice was taken on in his stead on similar financial terms. He later became an insurance agent for the American Casualty Company, achieving a modest financial success through his efforts.

=== Political career ===
Wilson was converted to the ideas of Socialism in 1906 when he came into contact with political pamphlets brought home by his father. In 1910 he decided to end his career as an insurance salesman to work for the socialist cause, taking a lesser-paying position as the secretary and organizer of Local Berks County, Socialist Party. He remained in this position until 1915. Wilson left the employment of the Socialist Party to become editor of The Labor Advocate, a weekly socialist newspaper published in Reading by Charles Maurer, brother of Reading's first state assemblyman elected by the Socialist Party, James H. Maurer.

An opponent of World War I, on May 12, 1917, Wilson was instrumental in the formation of a local anti-draft organization in 1917 called the American Union Opposed to Conscription. The group somewhat implausibly claimed a membership of over 1800 roughly two weeks later.

In November 1917, Wilson was a Socialist candidate for the Reading city council, running alongside future Mayor of Reading J. Henry Stump. In 1920 he was the party's candidate for the United States Senate from Pennsylvania.

Wilson was first elected the State Secretary of the Socialist Party of Pennsylvania in 1918, remaining in that post until 1923. In that year he moved to Buffalo, New York to become the business manager of The New Era, a weekly socialist paper published in that city.

During the course of his party activity, Wilson met an Indiana-born Socialist Party organizer named Lillith Martin. The pair were married in 1921. Lillith Martin Wilson became the first woman to run for Governor of Pennsylvania in 1923 and would later win election to the Pennsylvania General Assembly as a Socialist in 1930, 1932, and 1934. In 1936 she was diagnosed with breast cancer and was forced by health considerations to abandon efforts to win a fourth term of office. She died of her illness in 1937.

Wilson was active in the 1924 effort to elect Senator Robert M. La Follette President of the United States in 1924, serving as business manager for that effort.

In 1927 Wilson played a key behind-the-scenes role in the election of Henry Stump as Mayor of Reading. Wilson helped conceive the winning campaign strategy, relating to perceived inequalities in the property tax assessment process, and wrote the content of the campaign's literature. After Stump's election, Wilson went to work for the city, serving as the city's first centralized purchasing agent.

An unsuccessful effort was made by the high school dropout in the fall of 1933 to win election as a Socialist candidate to become Reading's Director of Schools. The next year Wilson stood for statewide office as the Socialist Party's nominee for Lieutenant Governor of Pennsylvania.

In 1940 Wilson filed papers to run for Pennsylvania Auditor General but he thought better of the matter and formally withdrew from the race on August 30.

=== Later years ===
Wilson retired in 1965.

=== Death and legacy ===
Birch Wilson died on February 18, 1974. He was 91 years old at the time of his death.

Wilson left an estate valued at approximately $11,000. As he had fathered no children and left no direct heirs, Wilson's estate was divided equally by a niece and two nephews, after a specified $500 was left to The Weekly People, official publication of the Socialist Labor Party of America.

== See also ==
- James H. Maurer
