= John M. Hemphill =

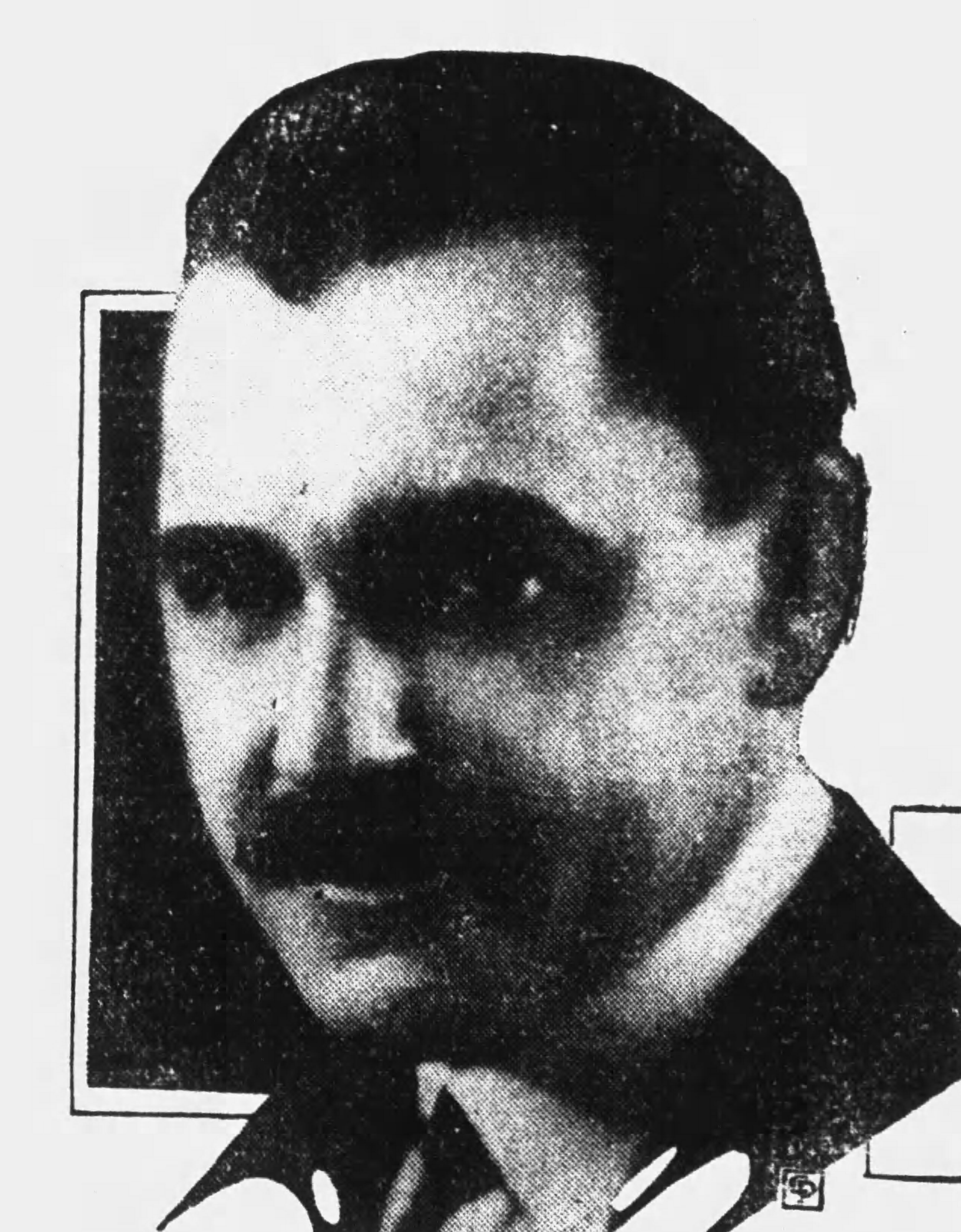
- Hemphill on October 31, 1930
- Born: September 6, 1891; Chester County, Pennsylvania
- Died: February 2, 1957 (aged 65); Stone Harbor, New Jersey
- Known for: Democratic nominee during 1930 Pennsylvania gubernatorial election
- Spouse: Ruth Hemphill
- Children: Alexander, Dellette, Robert

John Mickle Hemphill (September 6, 1891 – February 2, 1957) was an American politician best known for being the Democratic candidate for Governor of Pennsylvania during the 1930 Pennsylvania gubernatorial election.

== Early life ==
Hemphill was born in 1892 in Chester County, Pennsylvania to the local political Hemphill family, which had served as judges, district attorneys and state representatives since colonial times. He was the son of Elijah Dallett Hemphill (1845–1937) and Rebecca née Micklel Hemphill (1848–1925).

Hemphill graduated from the University of Pennsylvania law school as a member of Kappa Sigma fraternity.

== Career ==
After graduation, he quickly became involved in the local Democratic party and in organized opposition to the Eighteenth Amendment. In 1928 he was named a delegate for Pennsylvania to the Democratic National Convention, supporting Al Smith due to his anti-prohibition platform.

Hemphill served as a Captain in the United States Army during World War I, seeing combat in the Marne, Saint-Mihiel, and the Meuse–Argonne offensive. He was also a lawyer, and a partner at the offices of Hemphill & Brewster, and later Lewis, Wolff, Gourney & Hemphill, during which he legally challenged the 18th amendment and sought its repeal.

=== 1930 election ===
Incumbent Republican governor Gifford Pinchot had grown increasingly unpopular near the end of his term due to his strict enforcement of prohibition, anti-worker stances in various strikes across the state including his crackdown of the UMW general strike, as well as his attempts to rewrite the state constitution, coupled with him running afoul of Republican political boss William S. Vare saw a highly competitive campaign.

Hemphill's campaign would be swelled by anti-Pinchot and anti-prohibition Republicans, including William Winston Roper, the famous coach of the Princeton Tigers football team, however, due to his support for working with Republicans more stringent Democrats opposed his campaign, including William B. Wilson, former United States Secretary of Labor. Hemphill also saw the support from the Women's Organization for National Prohibition Reform (WONPR), a group concerned that Prohibition had, instead of reducing drunkenness in the country, increased it, and sought to pressure support for the repeal of the Eighteenth Amendment to the United States Constitution.

Hemphill would ultimately be defeated by more than 32,000 votes out of two million cast. However, he carried Philadelphia, a Republican stronghold, and received the endorsement of 47 of the 48 Republican ward leaders there.

=== Later life ===
Hemphill held a rally in Philadelphia on June 19, 1940, where he endorsed Republican Wendell Willkie for president in the 1940 election before 600,000 Democrats. Hemphill argued that Willkie was more in line with the Democratic platform of 1930 and 1932 than Franklin D. Roosevelt and that the Democratic party had become little more than a rubber stamp for Roosevelt's ambitions.

== Personal life ==
Hemphill was a member of the American, Pennsylvania, and Philadelphia bar associations. From 1928 to his death, Hemphill was named the honorary consul of Latvia in Philadelphia. He was also a member of the Rittenhouse Club, and was married to Ruth Hemphill, having two sons, Alexander and Dellett and a daughter; Robert Frisch née Hemphill.

Hemphill died in his home at Stone Harbor, New Jersey on February 2, 1957, at the age of 65.

Party political offices
Preceded by Eugene Bonniwell	Democratic nominee for Governor of Pennsylvania; 1930	Succeeded by George Earle
