= John A. McSparran =

John Aldus McSparran
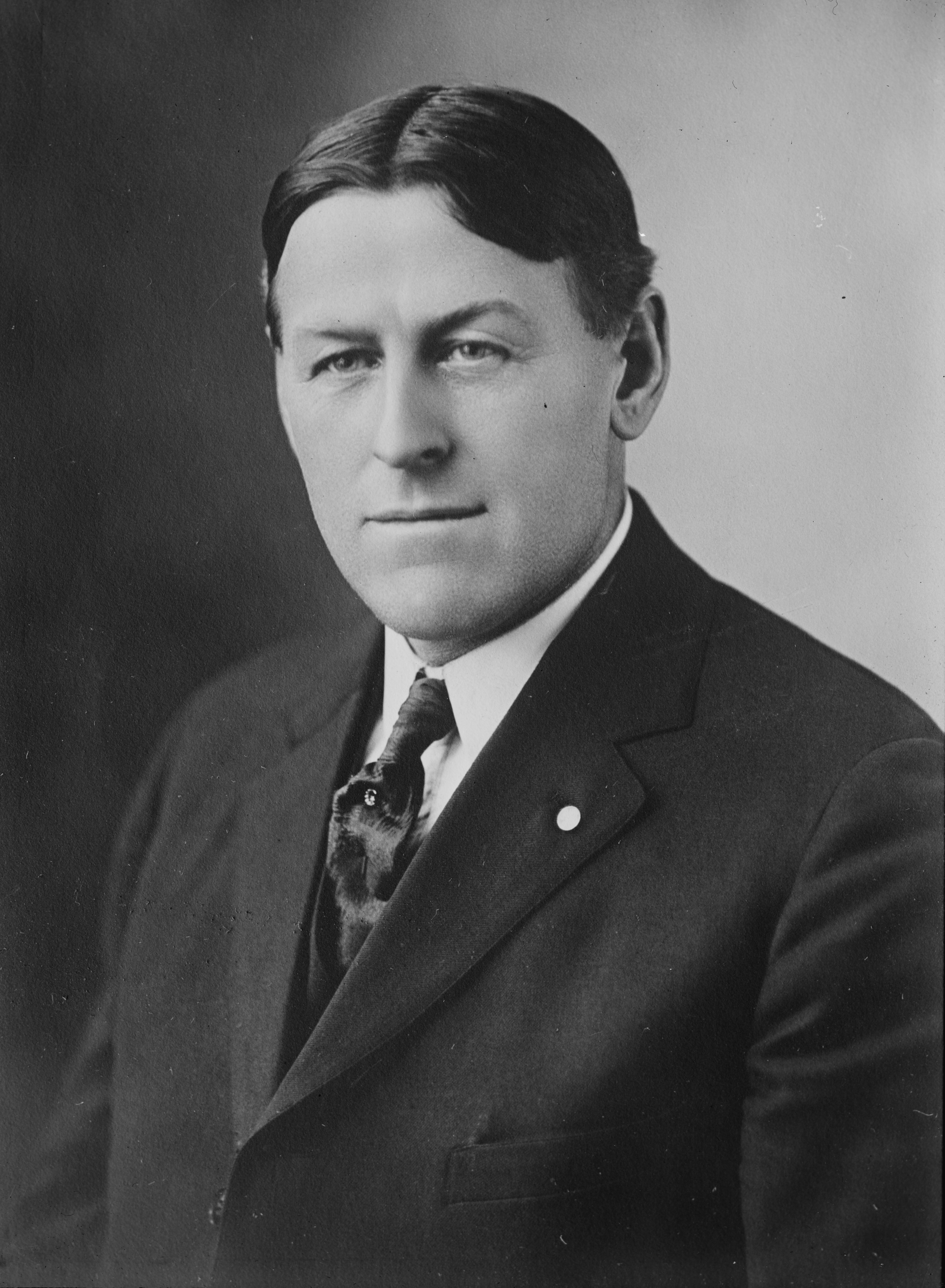
- John A. McSparran
- Born: October 22, 1873; Lancaster County, Pennsylvania, U.S.
- Died: January 28, 1944 (aged 70); Lancaster County, Pennsylvania, U.S.
- Occupation(s): Farmer, Politician

John Aldus McSparran (October 22, 1873 - January 28, 1944) was an American prominent landholder and politician from Lancaster, Pennsylvania.

McSparran was the Democratic opponent to Gifford Pinchot in the 1922 Pennsylvania gubernatorial election. McSparran attended Lafayette College and took up dairy farming in Lancaster County, where his family had long been seated. He served for years as Secretary, Treasurer and eventually Master of Pennsylvania State Grange. In 1931 Governor Gifford Pinchot appointed McSparran Secretary of Agriculture of the Commonwealth of Pennsylvania.

McSparran married first Bettie Harrison Goodwyn, the daughter of Judge Charles Frederick Goodwyn and Susan Lacy Tuggle of Nottoway, Virginia descendants of Peterson Goodwyn, Virginia burgess William Thorton and Irish immigrant William Thorton. Mrs. McSparran was also the paternal great-aunt of Charles F. G. Kuyk and authors Henry Meade Williams and Mona Williams. They were the parents of five children including J. Collins McSparran. After the death of his first wife, McSparran married Sadie Holland.

Party political offices
Preceded by Eugene Bonniwell	Democratic nominee for Governor of Pennsylvania; 1922	Succeeded by Eugene Bonniwell
