= Lilith Martin Wilson =

American politician (1886–1937)

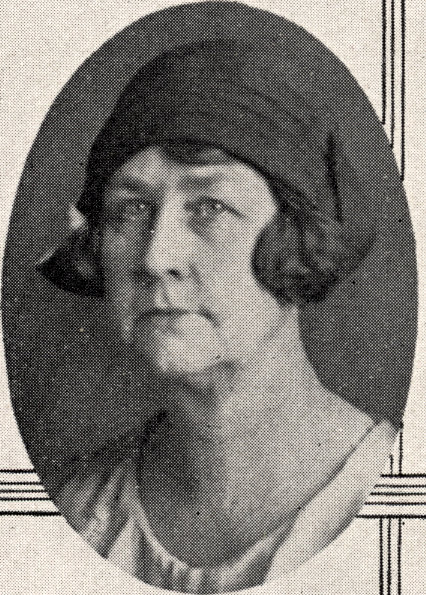
- Wilson c. 1930s

Member of the Pennsylvania House of Representatives
- In office 1930 – 1936

Personal details
- Born: September 13, 1886 Dublin, Indiana
- Died: July 8, 1937 (aged 50) Reading, Pennsylvania
- Party: Socialist Party of Pennsylvania
- Spouse: Birch Wilson (m. 1921)
- Occupation: Politician

Lilith Martin Wilson (September 13, 1886 – July 8, 1937) was an American socialist who served as a member of the Pennsylvania House of Representatives from 1930 to 1936. She was the first woman in Pennsylvania to run for governor, receiving just over two percent of the vote in the 1922 Pennsylvania gubernatorial election.

== Biography ==
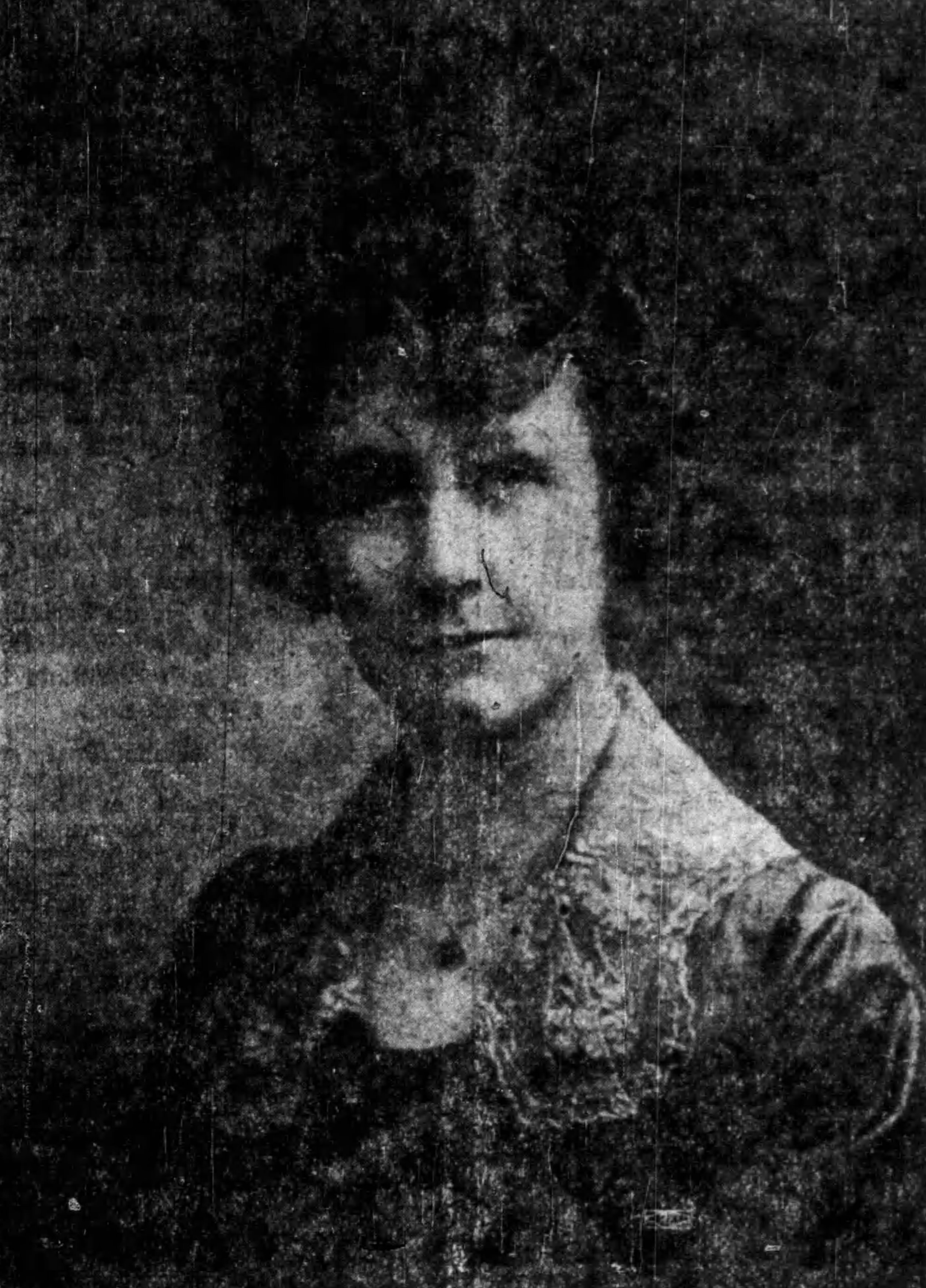
Wilson c. 1919

Wilson was born on September 13, 1886, in Dublin, Indiana, to Lida and Morris Browne. She attended high school in Kokomo, Indiana, and the Rand School of Social Science in New York.

Wilson was elected to the Pennsylvania House of Representatives in 1930, winning by a margin of 85 votes. She was subsequently reelected in the 1932 and 1934 elections, but did not run for reelection in 1936 due to failing health. As a member of the legislature, she campaigned for old age pensions, unemployment and maternity insurance, and child labor laws. She was a member of the League for Industrial Democracy, the Old Age Security League, and the Birth Control League of Berks County.

She died on July 8, 1937, at the age of 50.
