= Edward C. Shannon =

American politician

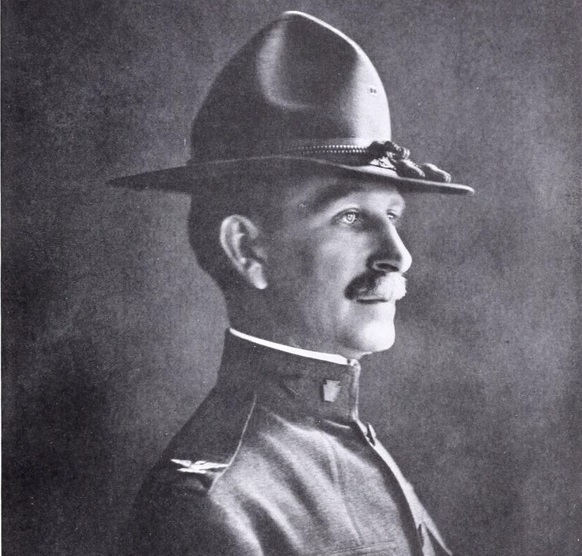
- Shannon as Colonel and commander of the 111th Infantry Regiment, 1918

15th Lieutenant Governor of Pennsylvania
- In office January 20, 1931 – January 15, 1935
- Governor: Gifford Pinchot
- Preceded by: Arthur James
- Succeeded by: Thomas Kennedy

Personal details
- Born: June 24, 1870 Phoenixville, Pennsylvania
- Died: May 20, 1946 (aged 75) Columbia, Pennsylvania
- Party: Republican

Military service
- Allegiance: United States
- Branch/service: United States Army; Pennsylvania National Guard
- Years of service: 1889–1939
- Rank: Major General
- Commands: 28th Infantry Division; 56th Infantry Brigade; 52nd Cavalry Brigade; 111th Infantry Regiment
- Battles/wars: Spanish-American War; World War I; Meuse-Argonne Offensive
- Awards: Army Distinguished Service Medal; Silver Star

Edward C. Shannon (June 24, 1870 – May 20, 1946) was the 15th lieutenant governor of Pennsylvania from 1931 to 1935.

== Biography ==
Edward Caswell Shannon was born in Phoenixville, Pennsylvania, on June 24, 1870, and grew up in Columbia, Pennsylvania. He studied metallurgical chemistry at Lehigh University and Lafayette College. He later completed a course in metallurgical chemistry in the laboratory of the Phoenix Iron Company, and then worked as a chemist and blast furnace superintendent in the iron and steel industries. In 1899 he married Maud Radcliffe Lucas (1877-1943). Shannon later worked as treasurer and general manager of Lucas Manufacturing, a clothes-making business in Columbia owned by his wife's family.

His military career began in 1889, when he enlisted in Company C, 4th Infantry Regiment, Pennsylvania National Guard. He advanced through the noncommissioned officer ranks and obtained a commission as a second lieutenant in 1893. He had attained the rank of captain and command of a company by the time he volunteered to serve in the Spanish–American War.

Shannon remained in the National Guard, and by 1915 had become commander of the 4th Infantry with the rank of colonel. He commanded his regiment on the Mexican border during the 1916 Pancho Villa Expedition. During World War I he continued in command of his regiment, which combined with other units and federalized as the 111th Infantry, 28th Division. During the war Shannon earned the nickname "Two Yard" because of the reputation he developed for leading his men from the front ("two yards" ahead) during their attacks on German positions. Shannon received the Army Distinguished Service Medal at the end of the war, the citation for which reads:

The President of the United States of America, authorized by Act of Congress, July 9, 1918, takes pleasure in presenting the Army Distinguished Service Medal to Colonel (Infantry) Edward C. Shannon, United States Army, for exceptionally meritorious and distinguished services to the Government of the United States, in a duty of great responsibility during World War I. As Commanding Officer of the 111th Infantry, 28th Division, Colonel Shannon proved himself a forceful and capable military leader. Maintaining at all times a high degree of efficiency in his regiment, he contributed materially to the success achieved by the 28th Division in its operations against the enemy, rendering services of distinction to the American Expeditionary Forces.

He was also awarded the Silver Star, with the citation reading:

By direction of the President, under the provisions of the act of Congress approved July 9, 1918 (Bul. No. 43, W.D., 1918), Colonel (Infantry) Edward C. Shannon, United States Army, is cited by the Commanding General, American Expeditionary Forces, for gallantry in action and a silver star may be placed upon the ribbon of the Victory Medals awarded him. Colonel Shannon distinguished himself by gallantry in action while serving as Commanding Officer, 111th Infantry Regiment, 28th Division, American Expeditionary Forces, in action 24 July 1918, at the Foret de Fere, France, in personally reconnoitering in front of his lines under intense machine gun fire.

After World War I Shannon was promoted to brigadier general as commander of Pennsylvania's 1st Infantry Brigade. He later commanded the 52nd Cavalry Brigade.

In 1919 he was elected prothonotary of Lancaster County. From 1930 to 1935 he served as lieutenant governor. Shannon unsuccessfully sought the Republican nomination for governor in 1934.

From 1933 to 1939 Shannon served as major general and commander of the 28th Infantry Division. He succeeded William G. Price Jr., and was succeeded by Edward Martin. During World War II Shannon was chairman of his local draft board.

Shannon died in Columbia on May 20, 1946. He was buried at Laurel Hill Memorial Gardens in Columbia.

Political offices
Preceded by Arthur James	Lieutenant Governor of Pennsylvania; 1931–1935	Succeeded by Thomas Kennedy
Party political offices
Preceded by Arthur James	Republican nominee for Lieutenant Governor of Pennsylvania; 1930	Succeeded by Harry Scott
