= Socialist Party of Pennsylvania =

American political party

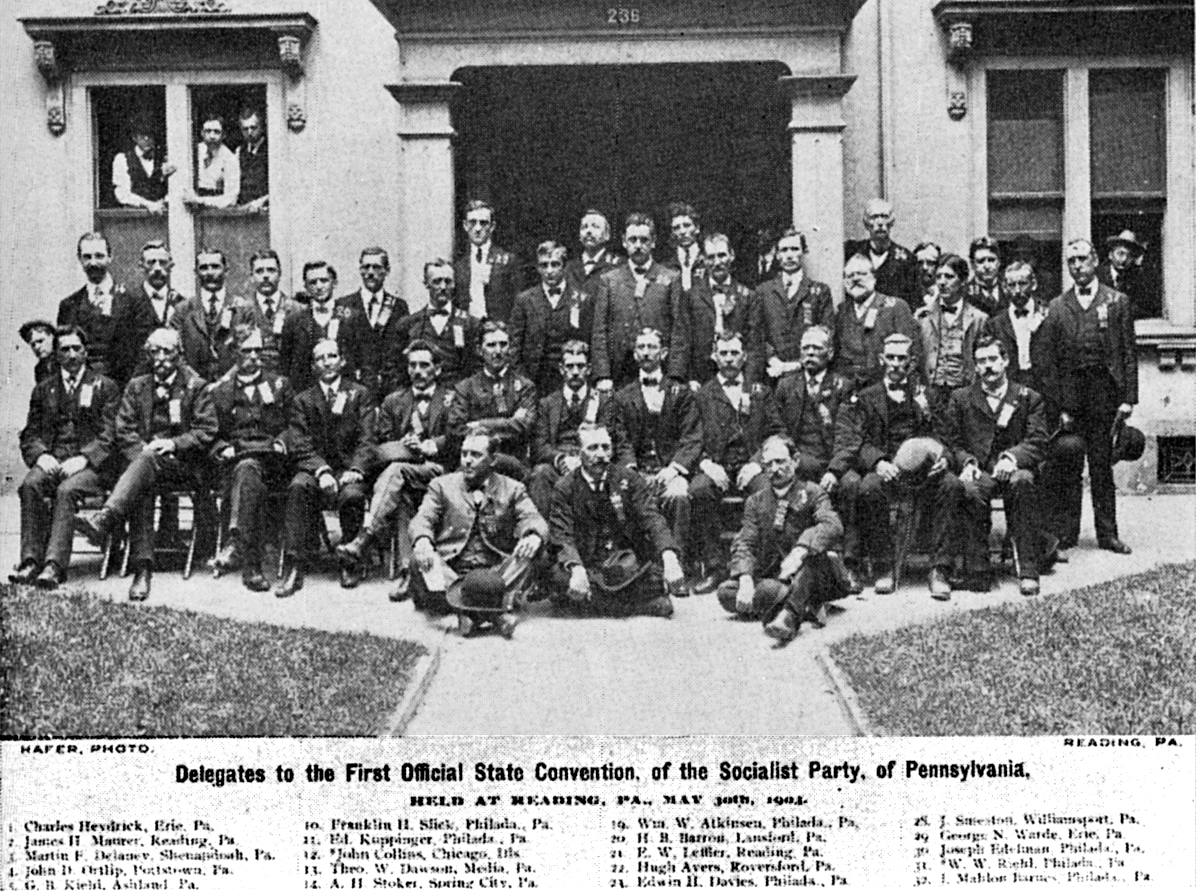
Delegates to the First Official State Convention of the Socialist Party in Pennsylvania in Reading, May 30, 1901.

The Socialist Party of Pennsylvania was a socialist political party in the U.S. state of Pennsylvania. It was founded in 1901 in Reading, Pennsylvania and received a state charter from the Socialist Party of America the following year. Reading was one of three cities which found considerable electoral success. Readings Socialists elected multiple state legislators, city councilors as well as mayor J. Henry Stump. The Socialist Party of America nominated former Pennsylvania Representative and SPA member Darlington Hoopes for president in 1952 and 1956. In 1965, the Reading chapter of the party was down to approximately 25 members. The national party was renamed Social Democrats, USA in 1972.

A successor organization, the Socialist Party USA, was formed in 1973 by the Debs caucus of the old SPA, a group which still supported independent socialist political action. As of 2016 the SPUSA has one local in the state, located in Philadelphia.

== Notable party members ==
- J. Mahlon Barnes, Executive Secretary of the Socialist Party of America (1905–1911)
- Andrew Biemiller, professor at the University of Pennsylvania and chairman of the education and literature committee of the Philadelphia County Socialist Party
- Ella Reeve Bloor, political activist and candidate for Governor of Pennsylvania
- Ben Fletcher, labor leader and co-founder of the Local 8 branch of the IWW’s Marine Transport Workers Industrial Union
- Darlington Hoopes, member of the Pennsylvania House of Representatives and two-time Socialist Party of America nominee for President (1952, 1956)
- Alice F. Liveright, Pennsylvania State Secretary of Welfare
- James H. Maurer, member of the Pennsylvania House of Representatives and two-time Socialist Party of America nominee for Vice President
- George M. Rhodes, member of the U.S. House of Representatives
- John W. Slayton, candidate for Governor of Pennsylvania in 1902, 1910, and 1926
- J. Henry Stump, mayor of Reading
- Birch Wilson, member of the National Executive Committee of the Socialist Party of America during the 1920s
- Lilith Martin Wilson, member of the Pennsylvania House of Representative and candidate for Governor of Pennsylvania; also the first woman to run for Governor of Pennsylvania
- Baruch Charney Vladeck, Philadelphia city manager of The Jewish Daily Forward and candidate for Judge of the Philadelphia Orphans' Court
- Raymond Hofses, member of the Reading School Board
- W. R. Hollinger, Reading City Controller
- George S. Snyder, member of the Reading City Council
- George D. Snyder, member of the Reading School Board
- Walter V. Tyler, mayor of New Castle
