= Edward E. Beidleman =

American politician (1873–1929)

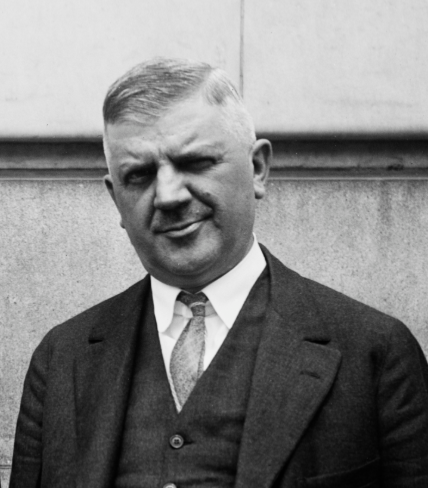
- Beidleman in 1926

12th Lieutenant Governor of Pennsylvania
- In office January 20, 1919 – January 15, 1923
- Governor: William Sproul
- Preceded by: Frank McClain
- Succeeded by: David J. Davis

Member of the Pennsylvania Senate from the 15th district
- In office January 7, 1913 – January 20, 1919
- Preceded by: John Fox
- Succeeded by: Frank Smith

Member of the Pennsylvania House of Representatives from the Dauphin County district
- In office January 3, 1905 – February 15, 1906

Personal details
- Born: July 8, 1873 Harrisburg, Pennsylvania, U.S.
- Died: April 9, 1929 (aged 55) Harrisburg, Pennsylvania, U.S.
- Resting place: Harrisburg Cemetery, Harrisburg, Pennsylvania, U.S.
- Party: Republican

Edward Ensinger Beidleman (July 8, 1873 – April 9, 1929) was an American politician from Pennsylvania who served as a Republican member of the Pennsylvania House of Representatives for Dauphin County from 1905 to 1908, the Pennsylvania Senate for the 15th district from 1913 to 1918, and as the 12th Lieutenant Governor of Pennsylvania from 1919 to 1923.

== Early life and education ==
Beidleman was born in Harrisburg, Pennsylvania, to Thomas and Susan (Ensinger) Beidleman. He attended the public schools, graduated from Harrisburg High School in 1892 and received a degree from the Keystone Business College.

He studied law under Samuel McCarrell and was accepted to the Dauphin County bar on January 28, 1898.

== Business career ==
He worked as a labor foreman for Lochiel Iron Works from 1867 to 1889, as an assistant at the Lochiel Merchandise Company from 1889 to 1900, and as a lawyer for Beidleman & Hull.

== Political career ==
He served as a member of the Pennsylvania House of Representatives for Dauphin County from 1905 to 1908. He served as a member of the Pennsylvania State Senate from 1913 to 1919, including as President pro tempore from 1917 to 1918. He was a delegate to the Republican National Convention from Pennsylvania in 1924. He had an unsuccessful campaign for Governor of Pennsylvania in 1928.

He died on April 9, 1929, in Harrisburg of a heart attack and was interred at Harrisburg Cemetery.

Political offices
Preceded by Frank McClain	Lieutenant Governor of Pennsylvania; 1919–1923	Succeeded by David Davis
Pennsylvania State Senate
Preceded by John Fox	Member of the Pennsylvania Senate for the 15th District; 1913–1919	Succeeded by Frank Smith
Pennsylvania House of Representatives
Preceded by	Member of the Pennsylvania House of Representatives, Delaware County; 1905–1906	Succeeded by
Party political offices
Preceded by Frank McClain	Republican nominee for Lieutenant Governor of Pennsylvania; 1918	Succeeded by David Davis
