= 1918 Pennsylvania gubernatorial election =

- November 5, 1918
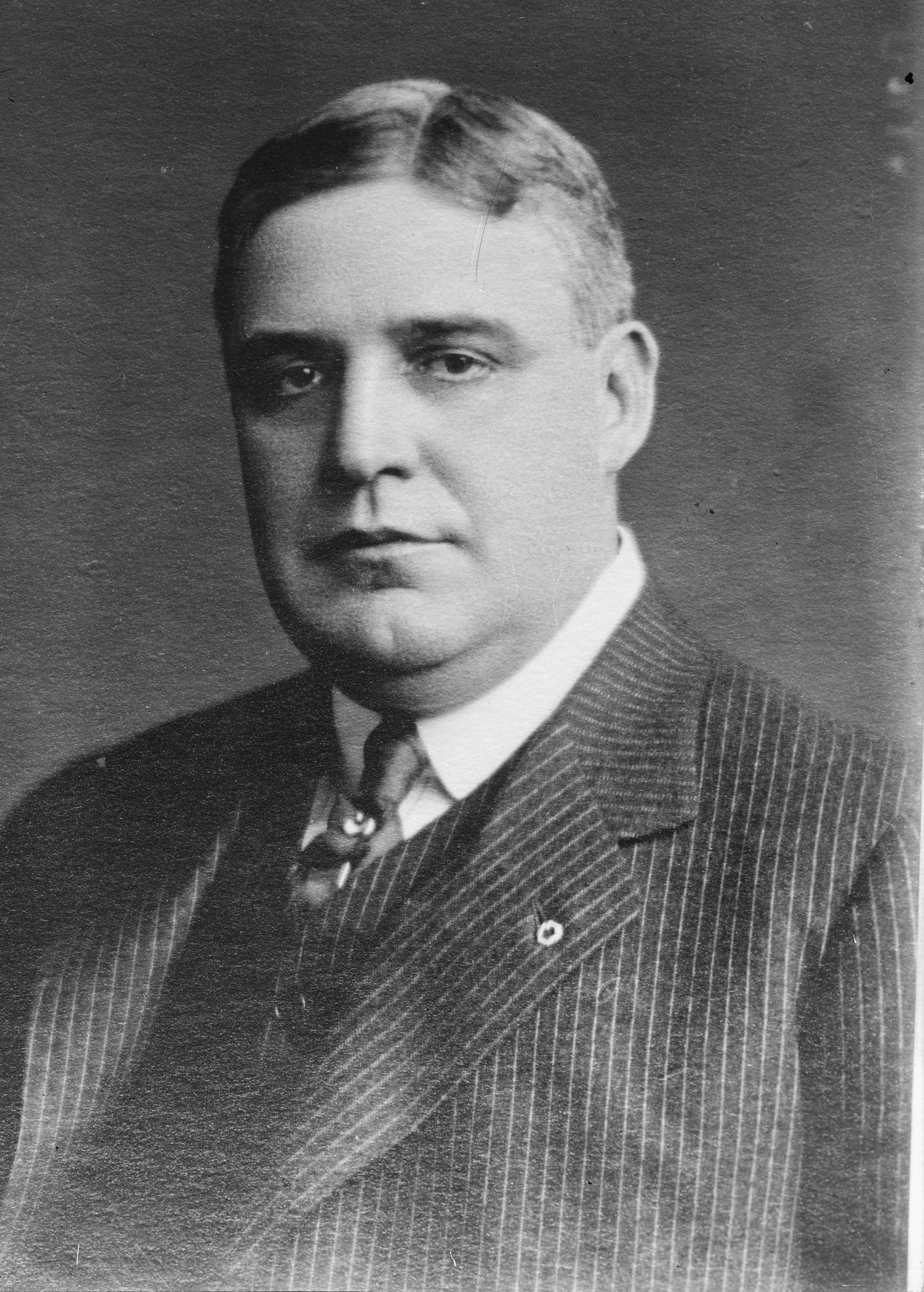

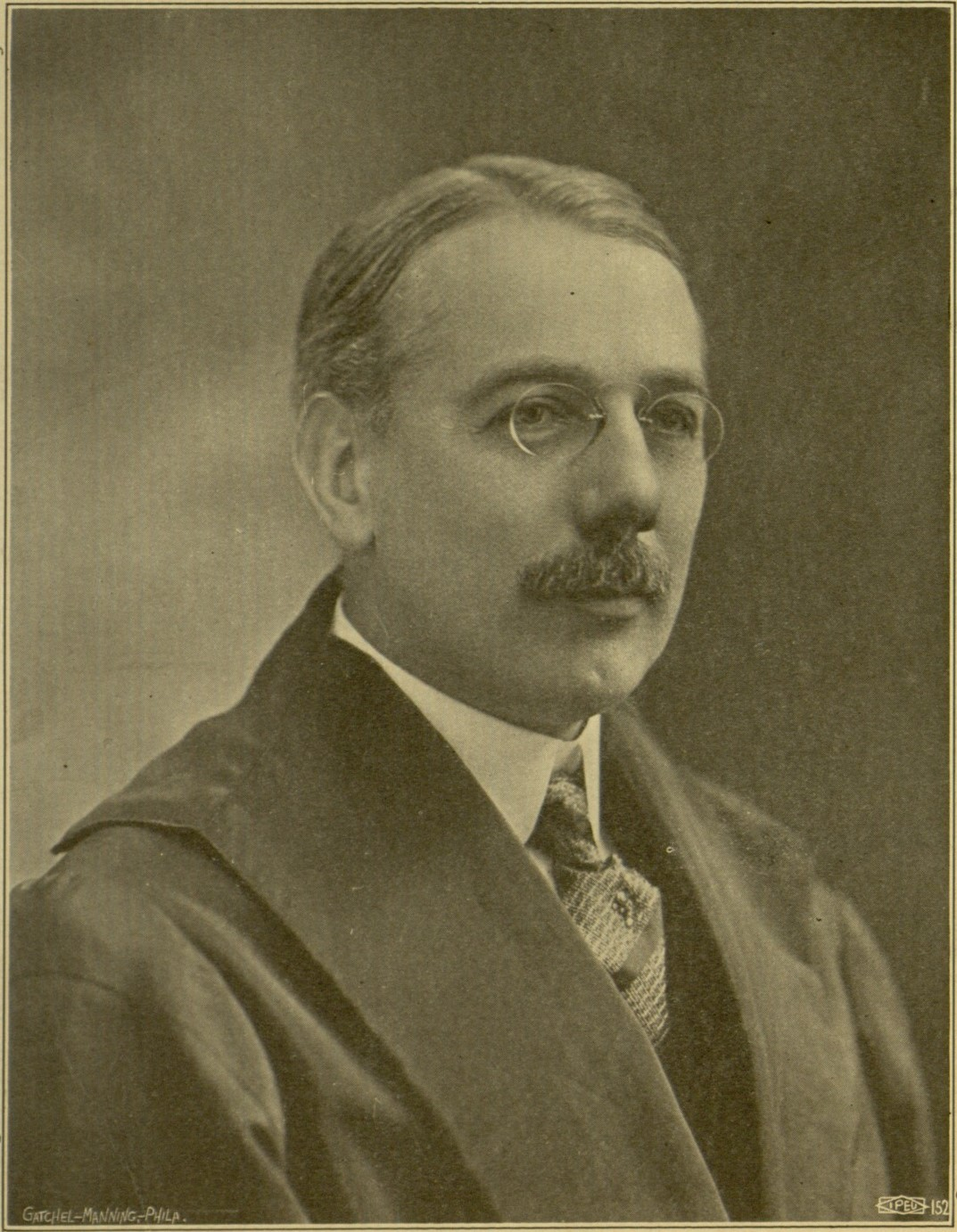
Nominee	William Sproul	Eugene C. Bonniwell
Party	Republican	Democratic
Popular vote	552,537	305,315
Percentage	61.05%	33.74%
- County results Sproul: 40–50% 50–60% 60–70% 70–80% 80–90% Bonniwell: 40–50% 50–60%
Governor before election
Martin G. Brumbaugh
Republican
Elected Governor
William Sproul
Republican

The 1918 Pennsylvania gubernatorial election occurred on November 5, 1918. Incumbent Republican governor Martin Brumbaugh was not a candidate for re-election. Republican candidate William Sproul defeated Democratic candidate Eugene C. Bonniwell to become Governor of Pennsylvania.

== Democratic primary ==
=== Candidates ===
- Eugene C. Bonniwell, judge of the Philadelphia Municipal Court
- Joseph F. Guffey, business executive
- John Butch McDevitt

=== Results ===
Democratic primary results Bonniwell: 40%–50%; 50%–60%; 60%–70%; 70%–80%; 80%–90%; Guffey: 40%–50%; 50%–60%; 60%–70%; 70%–80%; Tie: 40%–50%

Pennsylvania gubernatorial Democratic primary election, 1918
Party	Candidate	Votes	%
Democratic	Eugene C. Bonniwell	78,208	51.33
Democratic	Joseph F. Guffey	65,876	43.24
Democratic	John Butch McDevitt	8,007	5.26
Write-in		259	0.17
Total votes		152,350	100.00

== Republican primary ==
=== Candidates ===
- Robert Patton Habgood
- J. Denny O'Neil
- William Sproul, member of the Pennsylvania State Senate
- Asa A. Weimer

=== Results ===
Republican primary results Sproul: 40%–50%; 50%–60%; 60%–70%; 70%–80%; 80%–90%; 90%–100%; O'Neil: 40%–50%; 50%–60%; 60%–70%

Pennsylvania gubernatorial Republican primary election, 1918
Party	Candidate	Votes	%
Republican	William Sproul	353,711	66.46
Republican	J. Denny O'Neil	150,459	28.27
Republican	Robert Patton Habgood	18,807	3.53
Republican	Asa A. Weimer	9,110	1.71
Write-in		127	0.02
Total votes		532,214	100.00

== Results ==
Pennsylvania gubernatorial election, 1918
Party	Candidate	Votes	%
Republican	William Cameron Sproul	552,537	61.05
Democratic	Eugene C. Bonniwell	305,315	33.74
Prohibition	Edwin J. Fithian	27,359	3.02
Socialist	Charles Sehl	18,714	2.07
Single Tax	Robert Colvin Macauley, Jr.	4,031	0.36
N/A	Others	33	0.00
Total votes		905,035	100.00
