= James H. Maurer =

American politician (1864–1944)

James Maurer
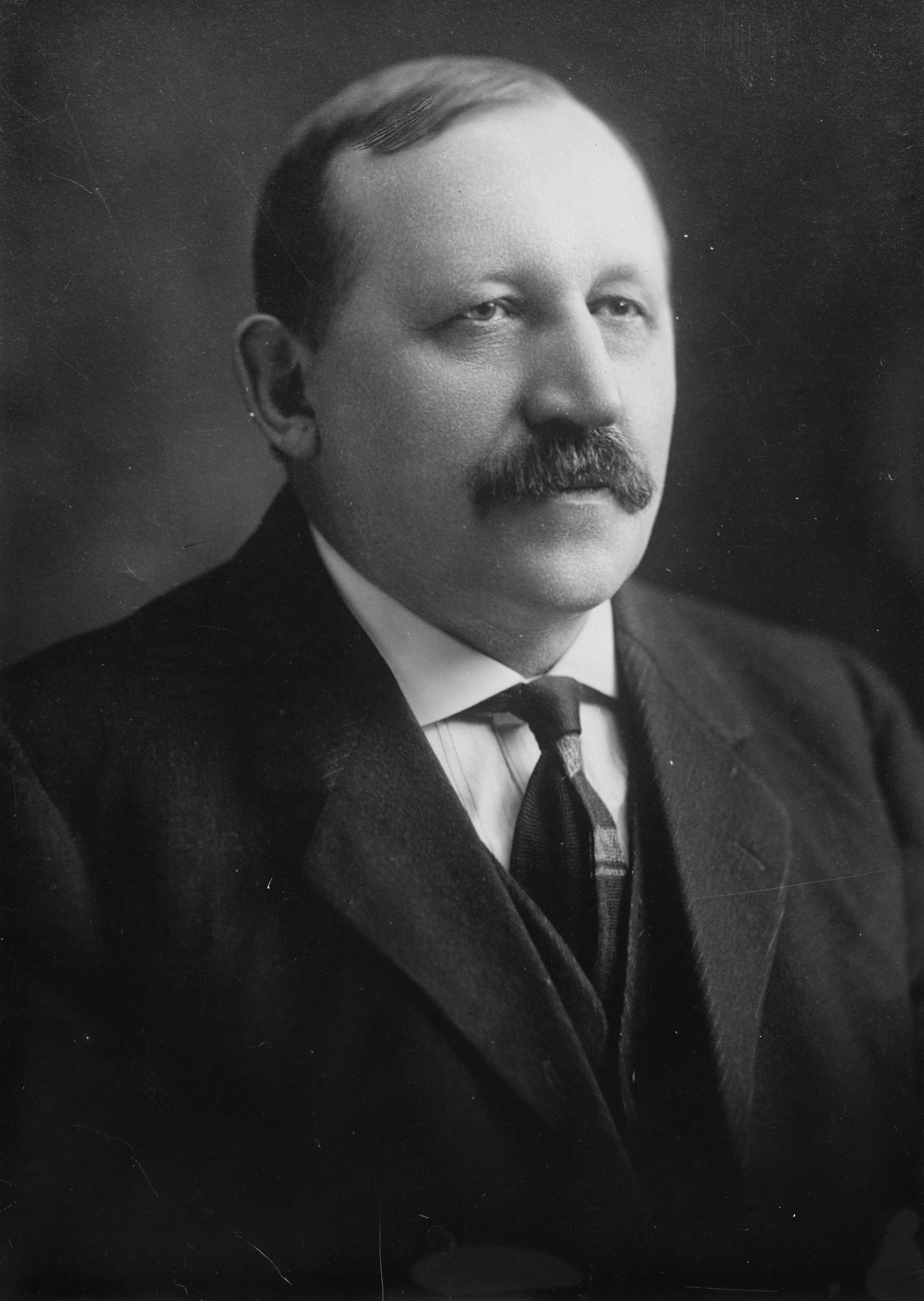
- Maurer c. 1919

President of the Pennsylvania Federation of Labor
- In office March 16, 1912 – May 11, 1928
- Preceded by: Elmer Ellsworth Greenawalt
- Succeeded by: John J. Casey

Member of the Pennsylvania House of Representatives from the Berks County district
- In office January 5, 1915 – January 7, 1919
- Preceded by: Multi-member district
- Succeeded by: Multi-member district
- In office January 3, 1911 – January 7, 1913
- Preceded by: Multi-member district
- Succeeded by: Multi-member district

Member of the Reading City Council
- In office January 3, 1927 – January 4, 1931
- Preceded by: Fred G. Hodges
- Succeeded by: William J. Smith

Personal details
- Born: James Hudson Maurer; April 15, 1864 Reading, Pennsylvania, U.S.
- Died: March 6, 1944 (aged 79) Reading, Pennsylvania, U.S.
- Party: Populist (1891–1899); Socialist Labor (1899–1901); Socialist (1901–1944)

James Hudson Maurer (April 15, 1864 – March 16, 1944) was a prominent American socialist politician and trade unionist who twice ran for the office of vice president of the United States on the ticket of the Socialist Party of America. He served three non-consecutive terms in the Pennsylvania House of Representatives between 1911 and 1919, and as President of the Pennsylvania Federation of Labor from 1912 to 1928.

== Biography ==
=== Early years ===
Maurer was born in Reading, Pennsylvania, on April 15, 1864, and was one of three brothers. His father, James D. Maurer, was a shoemaker who later served as a Police officer in Reading. Maurer first went to work at the age of 6 as a newsboy, becoming an assistant to a plumber at the age of 10, later becoming a full-fledged plumber. The Maurers were of Pennsylvania Dutch ethnic extraction and the family had ancestors in America dating back nearly two centuries.

=== Socialist and labor politics ===
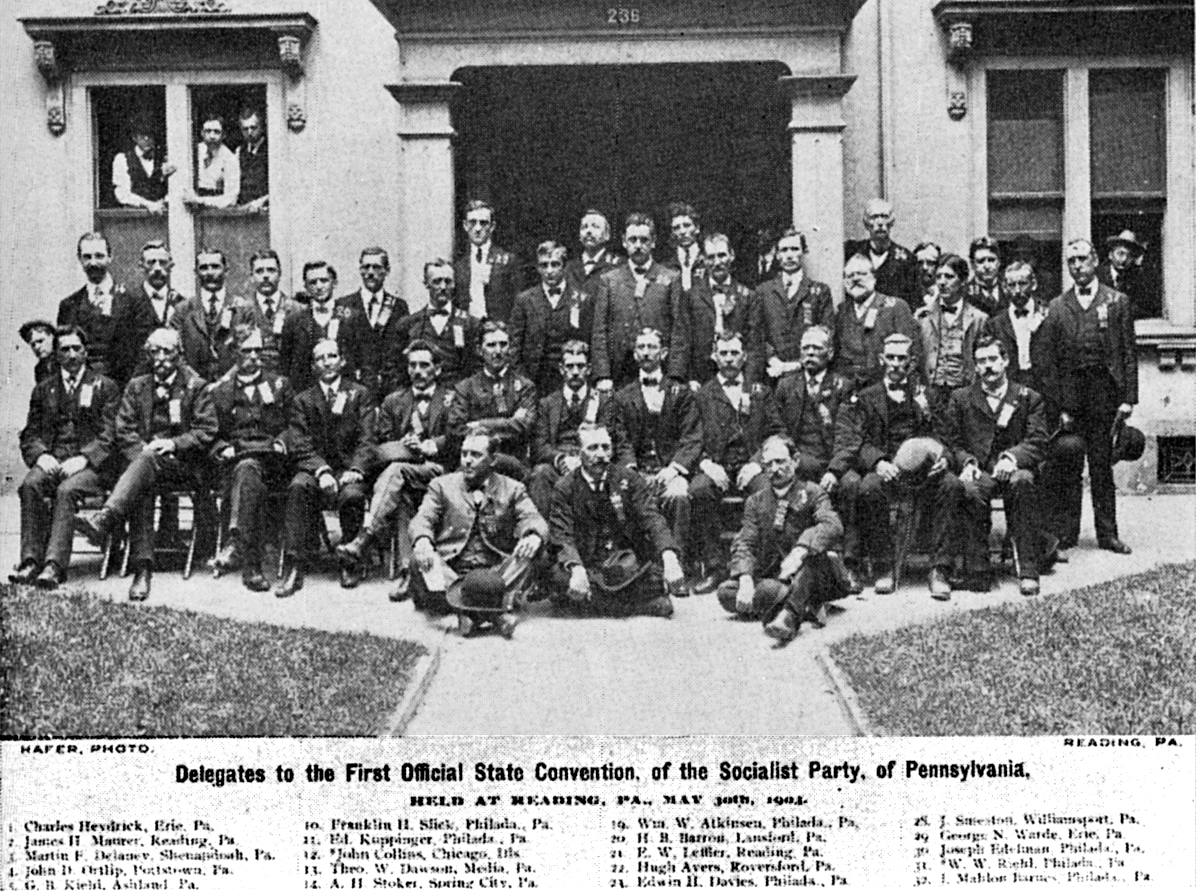
Maurer (seated, center) amongst delegates to the first official state convention of the Socialist Party of Pennsylvania in Reading, May 30, 1901.

Maurer joined the Knights of Labor labor union on his 16th birthday in April 1880. He was also active in the Single Tax movement associated with Henry George. In the early 1890s, he joined the People's Party, a populist political organization which attempted in particular to advance the cause of the country's farmers. He was introduced to socialist ideas near the end of the decade, taking nearly a year to read Karl Marx's Capital before joining the Socialist Labor Party of America (SLP) in 1899. Maurer helped to organize Section Hamburg, Pennsylvania SLP, in February of that year.

From 1901, Maurer was a member of the Plumbers and Steamfitters Union. Throughout his later life, he was strongly supportive of the American Federation of Labor and he came to strongly disapprove of the SLP's efforts to establish a competing socialist trade union to the AF of L, the Socialist Trade and Labor Alliance, and left the SLP to join the Socialist Party of America (SPA) in 1901 over this issue. He ran for governor of Pennsylvania on the Socialist Party ticket in 1906, receiving nearly 26,000 votes.

In November 1910, Maurer was elected as a Socialist to the Pennsylvania House of Representatives, serving during 1912. During his term in the legislature, Maurer fought for the passage of a plan for Old Age Pensions and attempted to prevent the establishment of a State Constabulary, which was seen as a mechanism for the armed and organized breaking of strikes.

Also in 1912, Maurer was elected as president of the Pennsylvania Federation of Labor, a post which he held until 1930. Defeated in his bid for re-election to the Pennsylvania House in 1913, he came back from the loss to win election to two more terms, in 1915 and 1917. During his second and third terms of office, he was instrumental in working for the passage of child labor and workmen's compensation legislation in the state.

=== Anti-militarist activities ===
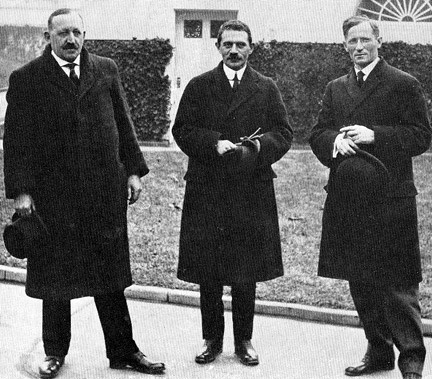
SPA leaders Jim Maurer, Morris Hillquit, and Meyer London after a meeting with President Wilson, January 26, 1916.

In January 1916, Maurer was part of a three-person delegation to President Woodrow Wilson to advocate part of the Socialist Party's peace program, proposing that "the President of the United States convoke a congress of neutral nations, which shall offer mediation to the belligerents and remain in permanent session until the termination of the war". A resolution to this effect had been offered in the House of Representatives by the SPA's only congressman, Meyer London of New York, and Wilson received London, Maurer and the party leader, Morris Hillquit, at the White House, along with various other delegations.

Maurer was the only member of the Pennsylvania legislature to vote against a resolution supporting American severance of diplomatic relations with Germany in the run up to American entry into the war. When he attempted to explain his voting rationale on the floor, Maurer was rudely shouted down by his colleagues and ruled out of order by the chair.

Hillquit later recalled that Wilson was at first "inclined to give us a short and perfunctory hearing" but as the Socialists made their case to him, the session "developed into a serious and confidential conversation". Wilson told the group that he had already considered a similar plan but chose not to put it into effect because he was not sure of its reception by other neutral nations. "The fact is," Wilson claimed, "that the United States is the only important country that may be said to be neutral and disinterested. Practically all other neutral countries are in one way or another tied up with some belligerent power and dependent on it."

On July 30, 1917, a public Maurer speaking event in Seattle was the scene of a near riot when his speech on the topic "Is Conscription Constitutional?" was broken up by khaki-clad soldiers. At an "open air mass meeting" held under the auspices of the People's Council of America, Maurer had spoken for about 15 minutes when a group of soldiers began heckling him. Maurer briefly tried to shame the hecklers into silence, but instead the soldiers rushed the speaker's platform and forcibly brought his oration to a close. According to a contemporary news report, only the quick action of a local socialist activist, Kate Sadler, prevented the tense situation from degenerating into a riot, when she leaped to her feet, scolded the young soldiers, and abruptly launched into a short fundraising speech that defused the situation and allowed for an orderly termination of the meeting.

Maurer's outspoken opposition to the war hampered his support among his legislative constituents and he found his re-election efforts further challenged by a ban on public meetings enacted in an effort to slow the spread of deadly influenza. As a result, Maurer was defeated in his November 1918 bid to win another term in the legislature at Reading.

=== Post-war political career ===
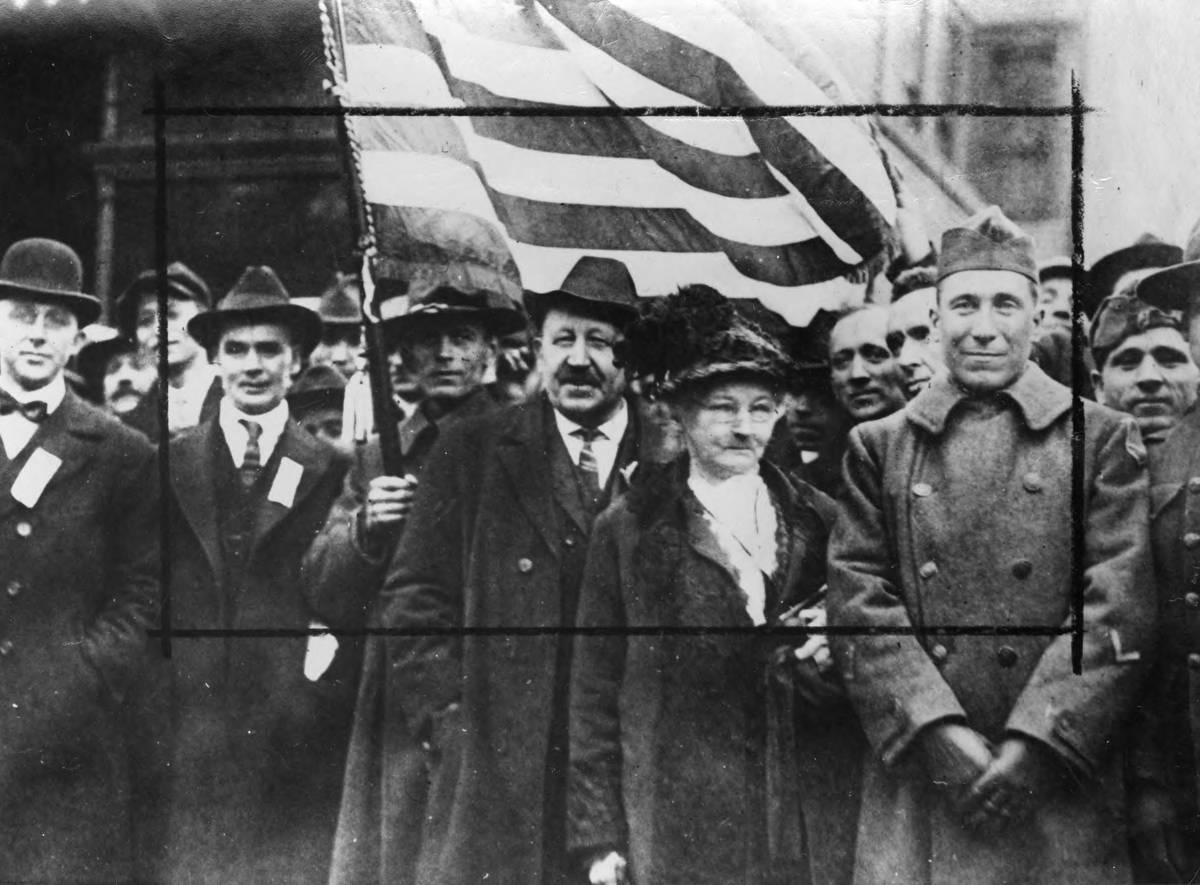
Maurer (in box, center), Philip Murray, Mother Jones and William Z. Foster surrounded by steel workers and unionists in uniform during the 1919 General Steel Strike

In his capacity as head of the Pennsylvania Federation of Labor, Maurer was very active in the steel strike of 1919 in Pittsburgh, helping to organize workers to win the right of collective bargaining with their employers.

Maurer was elected multiple times to the governing National Executive Committee of the SPA. He was also president of the Workers' Education Bureau of America and Brookwood Labor College from 1921. He was on the governing National Committee of the Conference for Progressive Political Action (CPPA) from 1922. He was strongly supportive of Robert LaFollette's 1924 presidential campaign.

In September 1927, Maurer, as its chairman, headed an American workers' delegation and visited the Soviet Union. He exchanged opinions with its leader, Joseph Stalin. Maurer was elected to the Reading City Council in November 1927, part of a sweep by the Socialist Party which won the administration of the city. He was re-elected in 1929, but was defeated in 1931 in a landslide Fusion victory.

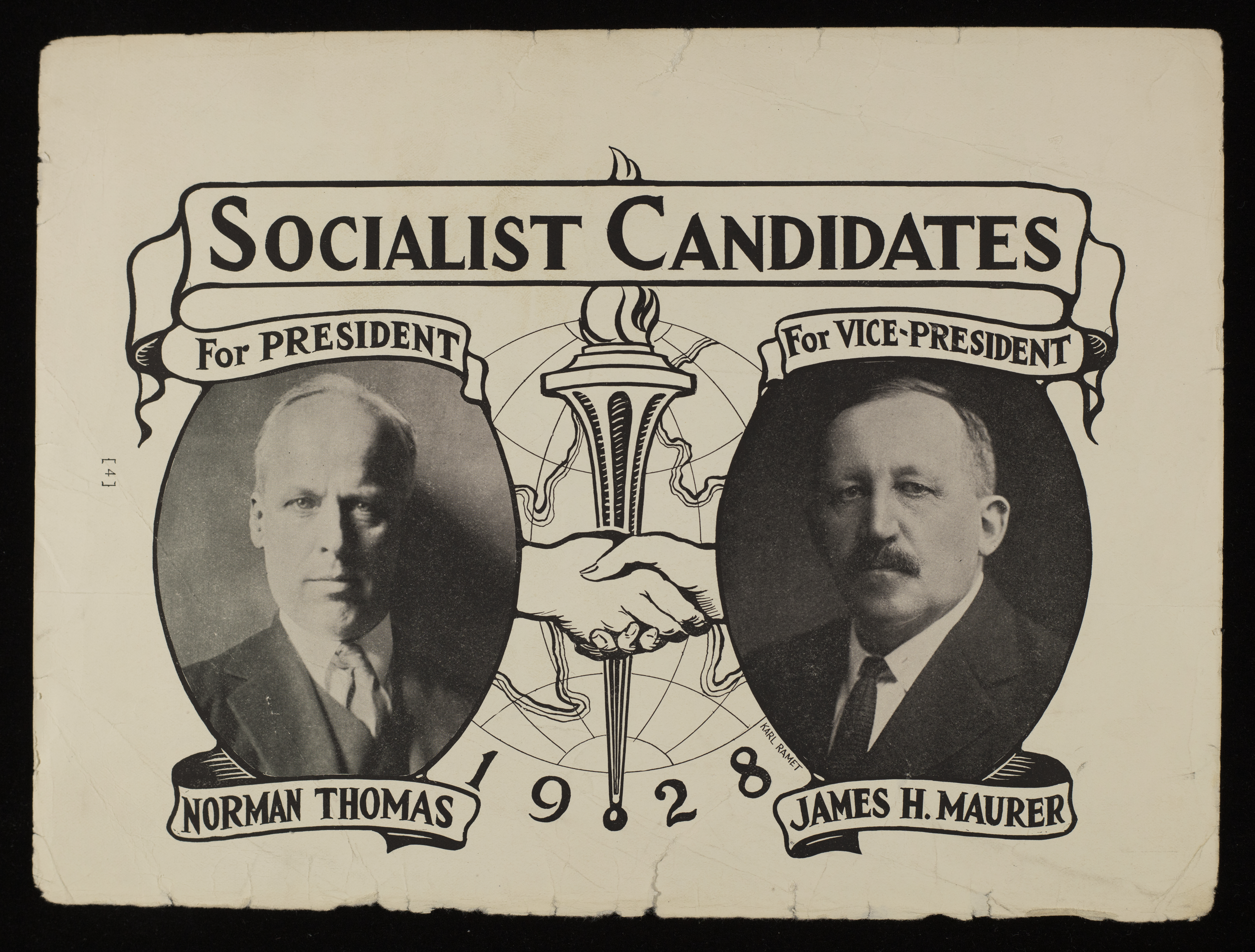
Norman Thomas and James H. Maurer as candidates for President and Vice President, 1928.

In 1928, Maurer was selected by the party convention to join Norman Thomas on the Socialist Party's presidential ticket. He ran a second time for governor of Pennsylvania in 1930. In 1932, he was selected once again as Thomas' running mate in the SPA's presidential campaign. In 1934, Maurer made his final electoral run as a candidate for US Senate from Pennsylvania.

In 1938, the Social Democratic Federation-affiliated Rand School Press published Maurer's autobiography, It Can Be Done.

Maurer retained his faith in socialism into the New Deal of President Franklin D. Roosevelt, writing in 1938:

There can be no doubt that if the cards were dealt honestly and the game played on the level without marked cards, the New Deal would be a vast improvement over the Old. But if President Roosevelt believes that those who profited under the old deal and never played the game square in their lives will now play fair with him, he is due for a rude awakening. I believe President Roosevelt is sincere and that he really hopes to lift the suffering masses out of their desperate poverty and yet save capitalism ...

Just how President Roosevelt and his advisers hope to lift the exploited and oppressed out of the mire by increasing profits and raising the cost of living is too deep for me. If they believe employers will increase wages as their profits increase, then they believe the leopard can change his spots. They should know that increased profits only increase the appetite for profits. The desire for the accumulation of great wealth seems like a disease, and disease has never been cured by increasing its virulence. ...[T]he one lasting solution is the end of the profit system.

== Death ==
Maurer died on March 16, 1944, in Reading, Pennsylvania. The eulogy at his funeral was delivered by Birch Wilson, a long-time party comrade from Reading. Maurer's family were Lutherans.

== Works ==
- Unemployment and the Mechanical Man Our strike-breaking governments n.d.
- The Far East (PDF). Reading, Pa.: Press of Sentinel Print. Co. 1912.
- The Constabulary of Pennsylvania. Reading, Pa. (with Charles Maurer)
- The American Cossack, Pennsylvania Federation of Labor, 1915.
- Things We Care About. (with others) [New York : People's Council of America for Democracy and Peace, 1917.
- Report of the Pennsylvania Commission on Old Age Pensions, March, 1919. Harrisburg, Penn.: J.L.L. Kuhn, Printer to the Commonwealth. 1919.
- A Heart to Heart Talk with Trade Unionists Chicago: Socialist Party National Office, 1920.
- Report on the Workers' Educational Classes in Pennsylvania during 1920-1921 Reading, PA: Peoples Printing Company, 1921.
- The Open Shop? Harrisburg, Pa., Pennsylvania Federation of Labor 1921.
- Report of the Pennsylvania commission on old age pensions. February, 1921 Harrisburg, Penna., J.L.L. Kuhn, Printer to the commonwealth, 1921.
- Report of the Pennsylvania Commission on Old Age Pensions, January, 1927. Harrisburg, PA: 1927.
- Unemployment and the mechanical man Chicago: Socialist Party of America, 1930.
- Socialism vs. capitalism Brooklyn: Socialist Party, Kings County, 1932.
- It Can Be Done: The Autobiography of James Hudson Maurer. New York: Rand School Press. 1938.

== See also ==
- Socialist Party of Pennsylvania
- Birch Wilson

Party political offices
Preceded by Burton K. Wheeler	Socialist nominee for Vice President of the United States; 1928, 1932	Succeeded by George A. Nelson
