= John Stuchell Fisher =

American politician

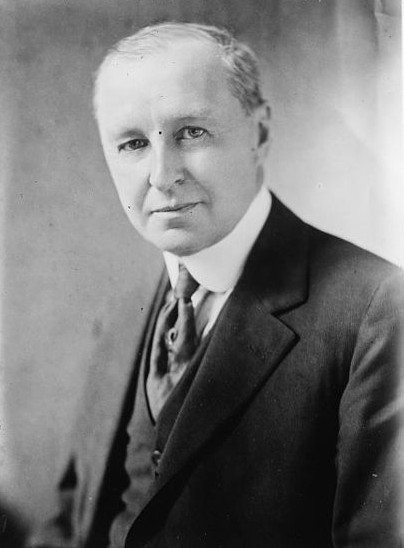

29th Governor of Pennsylvania
- In office January 18, 1927 – January 20, 1931
- Lieutenant: Arthur James
- Preceded by: Gifford Pinchot
- Succeeded by: Gifford Pinchot

Member of the Pennsylvania Senate from the 37th district
- In office January 1, 1901 – May 16, 1907
- Preceded by: James Mitchell
- Succeeded by: Theodore Kurtz

Personal details
- Born: May 25, 1867 South Mahoning Township, Pennsylvania
- Died: June 25, 1940 (aged 73) Pittsburgh, Pennsylvania
- Party: Republican
- Spouse: Hapsie Miller (1893–1922; her death)
- Profession: Teacher, Politician

John Stuchell Fisher (May 25, 1867 – June 25, 1940) was an American politician who served as the 29th governor of Pennsylvania from 1927 until 1931. A Republican, he had previously served as a Pennsylvania State Senator from 1901 until 1907.

== Life and career ==
Fisher was born in South Mahoning Township, Pennsylvania, in 1867. Fisher graduated from Pennsylvania's Indiana State Normal School (now Indiana University of Pennsylvania) and began his career as a teacher; he then served as principal for schools in Plumville and Indiana, Pennsylvania.

In 1893, Fisher finished his law degree, was admitted into the Pennsylvania Bar, and set up a private practice. He won his first major office, to the Pennsylvania State Senate, in 1900. He was re-elected in 1904 but did not seek re-election in 1908. He later served on the state's Commission on Constitutional Revision. From 1919 to 1922 he served in the cabinet of Governor William Cameron Sproul as State Commissioner of Banking. He was elected Governor in 1926.

As governor, Fisher focused on fiscal policy, public works, and conservation. Partly due to his efforts to eliminate voting fraud, the state began using mechanical voting machines. The Department of Revenue was established during his term. Fisher's term was marked by major investments in public works, most notably the Soldiers and Sailors Memorial Bridge in Harrisburg. Fisher was nicknamed "The Builder"; during his administration nearly 500,000 acres (2,000 km^{2}) was added to Pennsylvania's state forests. According to Major Israel McCreight, "Without his vigorous strokes for justice and fair play there would not now be the Cook Forest State Park."

After leaving office, Fisher became a consultant to his son's law firm. In addition to his political career, Fisher was vice president of the Clearfield Bituminous Coal Corporation, a captive subsidiary of the New York Central Railroad, where he played a significant role in the company's operations and development. He also served on the boards of several financial establishments, Indiana Hospital, Indiana State Normal School, and Pennsylvania State College. He died in Pittsburgh in 1940.

== Sources ==
- National Governors Association
- Pennsylvania Historical and Museum Commission
- ExplorePAHistory.com
- William Ainsworth Cornell, The Political Career of John S. Fisher, Governor of Pennsylvania 1927-1931 (Indiana, Pennsylvania: MA thesis: State Teachers College, 1947).

Political offices
Preceded by Gifford Pinchot	Governor of Pennsylvania; 1927–1931	Succeeded by Gifford Pinchot
Pennsylvania State Senate
Preceded by James Mitchell	Member of the Pennsylvania Senate for the 37th District; 1901–1907	Succeeded by Theodore Kurtz
Party political offices
Preceded by Gifford Pinchot	Republican nominee for Governor of Pennsylvania; 1926	Succeeded by Gifford Pinchot
