= Philadelphia Municipal Court =

Court in Pennsylvania, United States

- Location: Philadelphia
- Composition method: Partisanly elected and retained
- Authorised by: Pennsylvania Constitution
- Appeals to: Philadelphia Court of Common Pleas
- Number of positions: 28
- Website: www.courts.phila.gov

President Judge
- Currently: Hon. T. Francis Shields
- Since: January 2019

The Philadelphia Municipal Court is a trial court of limited jurisdiction seated in Philadelphia, Pennsylvania. It has 27 judges elected by the voters of Philadelphia. The Municipal Court has three divisions: the Criminal Division, the Civil Division, and the Traffic Division. Within the Unified Judicial System of Pennsylvania, it serves as a substitute for the magisterial district courts that serve the rest of the Commonwealth. It is a part of the First Judicial District of Pennsylvania.

The Criminal Division hears trials for misdemeanors and summary offenses. It also hears preliminary matters in felony cases before they are transferred to the Philadelphia Court of Common Pleas. The Criminal Division is seated at the Justice Juanita Kidd Stout Center for Criminal Justice.

The Civil Division has jurisdiction over small claims, landlord tenant evictions, and civil enforcement claims by the City of Philadelphia for violations of the Philadelphia Code. The maximum principal amount allowed to be filed for in most cases is $12,000. However, the City of Philadelphia may seek up to $15,000 in delinquent real estate tax debt and up to $12,500 in other delinquent taxes or utilities debt. There is also no limit for landlord tenant evictions in cases that leave the landlord with back rent and damages. The Civil Division is seated at the Widener Building at 1339 Chestnut Street (adjoining One South Broad).

The Traffic Division of Municipal Court was established by Act 17 of 2013 of the Pennsylvania General Assembly which abolished the former Philadelphia Traffic Court and transferred its jurisdiction to the Municipal Court. The Traffic Division is seated at the Traffic Court's former facilities at 800 Spring Garden Street, making it the only courthouse in Philadelphia outside Center City (at least by some definitions).

== See also ==
- Judiciary of Pennsylvania
- Supreme Court of Pennsylvania
- City court
