= List of Pennsylvania gubernatorial elections =

The election of the Governor of the Commonwealth of Pennsylvania occurs when voters in the U.S. Commonwealth of Pennsylvania select the Governor and Lieutenant Governor for the ensuing four years beginning at noon on the third Tuesday of January following the election. Pennsylvania gubernatorial elections were held triennially beginning with the first election in 1790 until 1878. Gubernatorial elections have been held quadrennially since the election of 1882. Gubernatorial general elections are held on Election Day, coinciding with various other federal, statewide, and local races.

Per Article II of the 1790 Pennsylvania Constitution, gubernatorial elections were held triennially on the second Tuesday of October, with the three-year term commencing on the third Tuesday of December immediately following the election. Incumbents were permitted to serve for a maximum of nine years out of any period of twelve years. Ties were to be resolved, pursuant to the same document, by a joint vote of the Pennsylvania General Assembly, consisting of the House of Representatives and the Senate. The 1874 Pennsylvania Constitution mandated the date of gubernatorial elections to be likewise that of the general election on Election Day in November and extended the term to four years, beginning on the third Tuesday of January following the election. In the original text of the 1874 Constitution, an incumbent governor was prohibited from running for a second successive term, but this was amended in 1967 to permit an incumbent to do so. The next gubernatorial election in Pennsylvania is scheduled to be held on November 5, 2030.

The list below contains election returns from all sixty-eight gubernatorial elections in Pennsylvania sorted by year, beginning with the first in 1790 and ending with the most recent in 2026. Incumbent governors are listed as well as elected governors and runner(s)-up in each election, including major third-party candidates (garnering 5% or more of the popular vote). Parties are color-coded to the left of a Governor's or candidate's name according to the key below. The popular vote and percentage margins listed in the "Margin" column are the differences between the total votes received and percentage of the popular vote received by the top two finishers in the corresponding election (i.e. the margin-of-victory of an elected governor over the nearest competitor).

== List of elections ==
Parties (Note: As listed on the ballot and in election returns.)

Independent Federalist Democratic-Republican Democratic National Republican Anti-Masonic Independent Democrat Whig Know Nothing/American Republican Greenback Independent Republican Prohibition Constitution

Election	Incumbent governor	Elected governor	Votes	Runner(s)-up	Votes	Margin	Notes
1790	Office established	Thomas Mifflin	27,974 (90.71%)	Arthur St. Clair	2,864 (9.29%)	25,110 (81.42%)	
1793	Thomas Mifflin*	Thomas Mifflin	20,479 (65.47%)	Frederick Muhlenberg	10,802 (34.53%)	9,677 (29.94%)	
1796	Thomas Mifflin	Thomas Mifflin	30,020 (96.31%)	Frederick Muhlenberg	1,011 (3.24%)	29,009 (93.07%)	
1799	Thomas Mifflin	Thomas McKean	37,244 (53.29%)	James Ross	32,643 (46.71%)	4,601 (6.58%)	
1802	Thomas McKean	Thomas McKean	47,879 (73.76%)	James Ross	17,037 (26.24%)	30,842 (47.52%)	
1805	Thomas McKean	Thomas McKean	43,644 (53.14%)	Simon Snyder	38,483 (46.86%)	5,161 (6.28%)	
1808	Thomas McKean	Simon Snyder	67,975 (60.93%)	James Ross	39,575 (35.48%)	28,400 (25.45%)	
1811	Simon Snyder	Simon Snyder	52,319 (93.55%)	William Tilghman	3,609 (6.45%)	48,710 (87.1%)	
1814	Simon Snyder	Simon Snyder	51,099 (63.35%)	Isaac Wayne	29,566 (36.65%)	21,533 (26.7%)	
1817	Simon Snyder	William Findlay	66,331 (52.81%)	Joseph Hiester	59,272 (47.19%)	7,059 (5.62%)	
1820	William Findlay	Joseph Hiester	67,905 (50.60%)	William Findlay	66,300 (49.40%)	1,605 (1.2%)	
1823	Joseph Hiester	John Andrew Shulze	89,928 (59.24%)	Andrew Gregg	64,211 (42.30%)	25,717 (16.94%)	
1826	John Andrew Shulze	John Andrew Shulze	72,710 (96.87%)	John Sergeant	1,175 (3.13%)	71,535 (93.74%)	
1829	John Andrew Shulze	George Wolf	78,219 (60.17%)	Joseph Ritner	51,776 (39.83%)	26,443 (20.34%)	
1832	George Wolf	George Wolf	91,335 (50.88%)	Joseph Ritner	88,165 (49.12%)	3,170 (1.76%)	
1835	George Wolf	Joseph Ritner	94,023 (46.91%)	George Wolf	65,804 (32.83%)	28,219 (14.08%)	
1835	George Wolf	Joseph Ritner	94,023 (46.91%)	Henry A. P. Muhlenberg	40,586 (20.25%)	28,219 (14.08%)	
1838	Joseph Ritner	David R. Porter	127,821 (51.10%)	Joseph Ritner	122,325 (48.90%)	5,496 (2.2%)	
1841	David R. Porter	David R. Porter	136,504 (54.60%)	John Banks	113,473 (45.40%)	23,031 (9.2%)	
1844	David R. Porter	Francis R. Shunk	160,959 (50.69%)	Joseph Markle	156,562 (49.31%)	4,397 (1.38%)	
1847	Francis R. Shunk	Francis R. Shunk	146,181 (50.86%)	James Irvin	128,148 (44.58%)	17,976 (6.28%)	
1848	William F. Johnston	William F. Johnston	168,522 (50.04%)	Morris Longstreth	168,225 (49.96%)	302 (0.08%)	(Note: As speaker of the state senate, Johnston filled the unexpired term following the death of Francis Shunk, and was subsequently elected governor in his own right.)
1851	William F. Johnston	William Bigler	186,499 (51.16%)	William F. Johnston	178,034 (48.84%)	8,465 (2.32%)	
1854	William Bigler	James Pollock	204,008 (54.99%)	William Bigler	167,001 (45.01%)	37,007 (9.98%)	
1857	James Pollock	William F. Packer	188,887 (52.01%)	David Wilmot	146,136 (40.24%)	42,751 (11.77%)	
1857	James Pollock	William F. Packer	188,887 (52.01%)	Isaac Hazlehurst	28,132 (7.75%)	42,751 (11.77%)	
1860	William F. Packer	Andrew Curtin	262,353 (53.26%)	Henry Foster	230,239 (46.74%)	32,114 (6.52%)	
1863	Andrew Curtin	Andrew Curtin	269,506 (51.46%)	George Woodward	254,171 (48.54%)	15,335 (2.92%)	
1866	Andrew Curtin	John W. Geary	307,274 (51.44%)	Hiester Clymer	290,096 (48.56%)	17,178 (2.88%)	
1869	John W. Geary	John W. Geary	290,552 (50.40%)	Asa Packer	285,956 (49.60%)	4,596 (0.8%)	
1872	John W. Geary	John F. Hartranft	353,387 (52.55%)	Charles R. Buckalew	317,760 (49.60%)	35,627 (2.95%)	
1875	John F. Hartranft	John F. Hartranft	304,175 (49.90%)	Cyrus L. Pershing	292,145 (47.93%)	12,030 (1.97%)	
1878	John F. Hartranft	Henry M. Hoyt	319,567 (45.51%)	Andrew H. Dill	297,061 (42.31%)	22,506 (3.2%)	
1878	John F. Hartranft	Henry M. Hoyt	319,567 (45.51%)	Samuel R. Mason	81,758 (11.64%)	22,506 (3.2%)	
1882	Henry M. Hoyt	Robert E. Pattison	355,791 (47.80%)	James A. Beaver	315,589 (42.40%)	40,202 (5.4%)	(Note: This was the first Pennsylvania gubernatorial election to be held in the modern quadrennial cycle.)
1882	Henry M. Hoyt	Robert E. Pattison	355,791 (47.80%)	John Stewart	43,743 (5.88%)	40,202 (5.4%)	(Note: This was the first Pennsylvania gubernatorial election to be held in the modern quadrennial cycle.)
1886	Robert E. Pattison	James A. Beaver	412,285 (50.33%)	Chauncey F. Black	369,634 (45.12%)	42,651 (5.21%)	
1890	James A. Beaver	Robert E. Pattison	464,209 (50.02%)	George W. Delamater	447,655 (45.12%)	16,554 (4.9%)	(Note: Pattison was elected for his second, non-contiguous term as Governor in 1890.)
1894	Robert E. Pattison	Daniel H. Hastings	574,801 (60.31%)	William M. Singerly	334,404 (34.98%)	241,397 (25.33%)	
1898	Daniel H. Hastings	William A. Stone	476,206 (49.01%)	George A. Jenks	358,300 (36.87%)	117,906 (12.14%)	
1898	Daniel H. Hastings	William A. Stone	476,206 (49.01%)	Silas C. Swallow	132,931 (13.68%)	117,906 (12.14%)	
1902	William A. Stone	Samuel W. Pennypacker	593,328 (54.20%)	Robert E. Pattison	450,978 (41.19%)	142,350 (13.01%)	(Note: Former Governor Pattison ran for a third non-consecutive term.)
1906	Samuel W. Pennypacker	Edwin Stuart	506,418 (50.31%)	Lewis Emery Jr.	458,064 (45.51%)	48,354 (4.8%)	
1910	Edwin Stuart	John K. Tener	415,614 (41.63%)	William H. Berry	382,127 (38.27%)	33,487 (3.36%)	(Note: Berry appeared on the ballot as the candidate of the Keystone Party.)
1910	Edwin Stuart	John K. Tener	415,614 (41.63%)	Webster Grim	129,395 (12.96%)	33,487 (3.36%)	(Note: Berry appeared on the ballot as the candidate of the Keystone Party.)
1914	John K. Tener	Martin Brumbaugh	588,705 (52.98%)	Vance C. McCormick	453,880 (40.84%)	134,825 (12.14%)	
1918	Martin Brumbaugh	William Sproul	552,537 (61.05%)	Eugene C. Bonniwell	305,315 (33.74%)	247,222 (27.31%)	
1922	William Sproul	Gifford Pinchot	831,696 (56.79%)	John A. McSparran	581,625 (39.71%)	250,071 (17.08%)	
1926	Gifford Pinchot	John Fisher	1,102,823 (73.35%)	Eugene C. Bonniwell	365,280 (24.29%)	737,543 (49.06%)	
1930	John Fisher	Gifford Pinchot	1,068,874 (50.77%)	John M. Hemphill	1,010,204 (47.98%)	58,670 (2.79%)	(Note: Pinchot was elected for his second, non-contiguous term as Governor in 1930.)
1934	Gifford Pinchot	George Earle	1,476,377 (50.04%)	William A. Schnader	1,410,138 (47.80%)	66,239 (2.24%)	
1938	George Earle	Arthur James	2,035,340 (53.39%)	Charles Jones	1,756,192 (46.07%)	279,148 (7.32%)	
1942	Arthur James	Edward Martin	1,367,531 (53.67%)	F. Clair Ross	1,149,897 (45.13%)	217,634 (8.54%)	
1946	John C. Bell, Jr.	James H. Duff	1,828,462 (58.53%)	John S. Rice	1,270,947 (40.68%)	557,515 (17.85%)	(Note: Governor Martin resigned to assume a seat in the United States Senate. Accordingly, Lt. Gov. Bell finished the remainder of the term.)
1950	James H. Duff	John S. Fine	1,796,119 (50.74%)	Richardson Dilworth	1,710,355 (48.31%)	85,764 (2.43%)	
1954	John S. Fine	George M. Leader	1,990,266 (53.58%)	Lloyd H. Wood	1,717,070 (46.23%)	273,196 (7.35%)	
1958	George M. Leader	David L. Lawrence	2,024,852 (50.79%)	Arthur T. McGonigle	1,948,769 (48.88%)	76,083 (1.91%)	
1962	David L. Lawrence	William Scranton	2,424,918 (55.39%)	Richardson Dilworth	1,938,627 (44.28%)	486,291 (11.11%)	
1966	William Scranton	Raymond P. Shafer	2,110,349 (52.10%)	Milton Shapp	1,868,719 (46.13%)	241,630 (5.97%)	
1970	Raymond P. Shafer	Milton Shapp	2,043,029 (55.22%)	Raymond J. Broderick	1,542,854 (41.70%)	500,175 (13.52%)	
1974	Milton Shapp	Milton Shapp	1,878,252 (53.66%)	Andrew L. Lewis, Jr.	1,578,917 (45.11%)	299,335 (11.96%)	
1978	Milton Shapp	Dick Thornburgh	1,966,042 (52.54%)	Peter F. Flaherty	1,737,888 (46.44%)	228,154 (6.1%)	
1982	Dick Thornburgh	Dick Thornburgh	1,872,784 (50.84%)	Allen E. Ertel	1,772,353 (46.44%)	100,431 (4.4%)	
1986	Dick Thornburgh	Robert P. Casey	1,717,484 (50.69%)	William Scranton III	1,638,268 (48.35%)	79,216 (2.34%)	
1990	Robert P. Casey	Robert P. Casey	2,065,281 (67.65%)	Barbara Hafer	987,463 (32.35%)	1,077,818 (35.3%)	
1994	Robert P. Casey	Tom Ridge	1,627,976 (45.40%)	Mark Singel	1,430,099 (39.89%)	197,877 (5.51%)	
1994	Robert P. Casey	Tom Ridge	1,627,976 (45.40%)	Peg Luksik	460,269 (12.84%)	197,877 (5.51%)	
1998	Tom Ridge	Tom Ridge	1,736,844 (57.42%)	Ivan Itkin	938,745 (31.03%)	798,099 (26.39%)	
1998	Tom Ridge	Tom Ridge	1,736,844 (57.42%)	Peg Luksik	315,761 (10.44%)	798,099 (26.39%)	
2002	Mark S. Schweiker	Ed Rendell	1,913,235 (53.41%)	Mike Fisher	1,589,408 (44.37%)	323,827 (9.04%)	(Note: Governor Ridge resigned in October 2001 to become Homeland Security Advisor to President George W. Bush. Lt. Gov. Schweiker filled the unexpired term and did not seek election to a full term.)
2006	Ed Rendell	Ed Rendell	2,470,517 (60.36%)	Lynn Swann	1,622,135 (39.64%)	848,382 (20.72%)	
2010	Ed Rendell	Tom Corbett	2,172,763 (54.49%)	Dan Onorato	1,814,788 (45.51%)	357,975 (8.98%)	
2014	Tom Corbett	Tom Wolf	1,920,355 (54.93%)	Tom Corbett	1,575,511 (45.07%)	344,844 (9.86%)	
2018	Tom Wolf	Tom Wolf	2,895,652 (57.77%)	Scott Wagner	2,039,882 (40.70%)	855,770 (17.07%)	
2022	Tom Wolf	Josh Shapiro	3,031,137 (56.05%)	Doug Mastriano	2,238,477 (41.07%)	792,660 (14.40%)	
2026	Josh Shapiro	Josh Shapiro	3,034,792 (60.54%)	Stacy Garrity	1,913,175 (38.17%)	1,121,617 (22.37%)	

== See also ==
- List of governors of Pennsylvania
- List of United States Senate elections in Pennsylvania
- List of United States presidential elections in Pennsylvania
- Elections in Pennsylvania
- Government of Pennsylvania
