= List of governors of Pennsylvania =

Governor of the Commonwealth of Pennsylvania
- Seal of the governor

- Flag of the governor

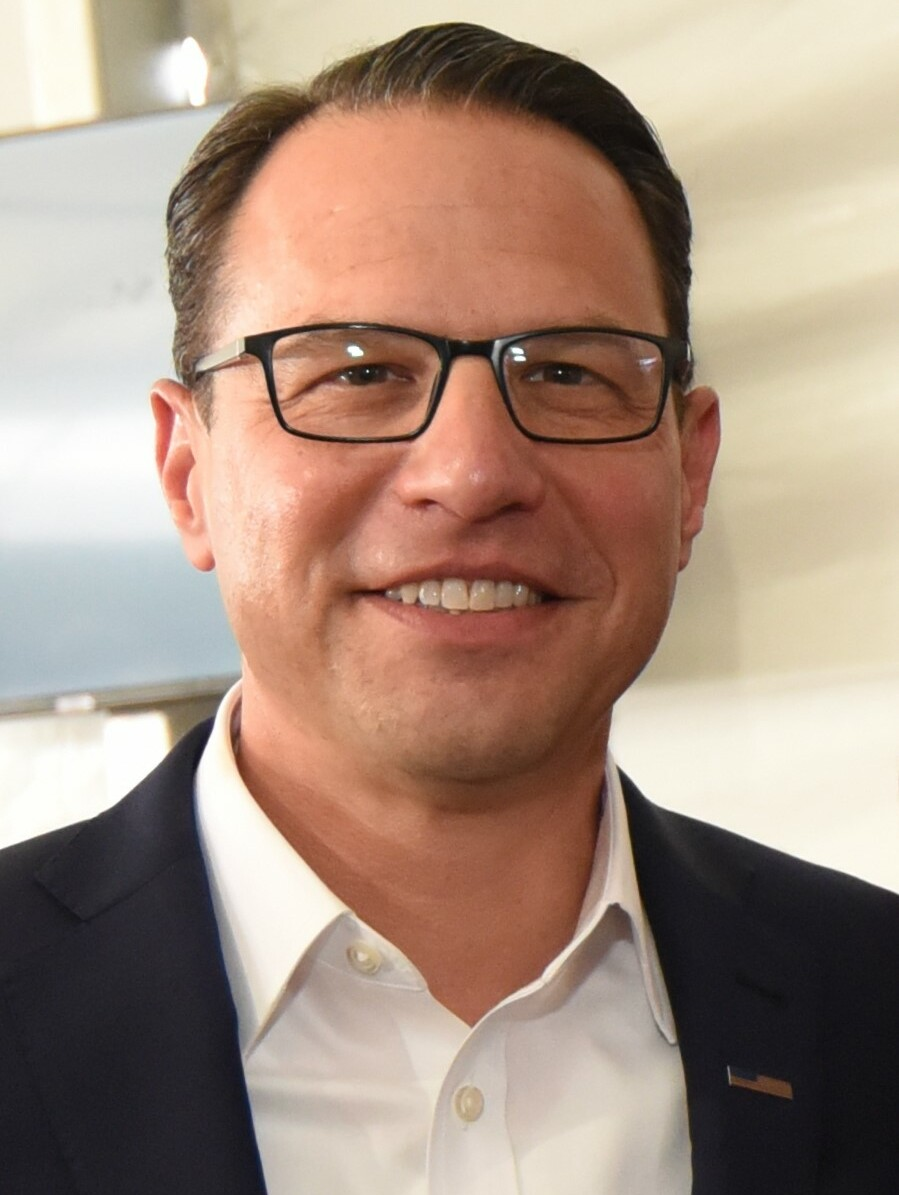
- Incumbent; Josh Shapiro since January 17, 2023
- Government of Pennsylvania
- Style: Governor (informal); The Honorable (formal)
- Status: Head of state; Head of government
- Residence: Governor's Residence
- Term length: Four years, renewable once consecutively
- Inaugural holder: Thomas Mifflin
- Formation: December 21, 1790
- Succession: Line of succession
- Deputy: Lieutenant Governor of Pennsylvania
- Salary: $213,026 (2022)
- Website: Official website

The governor of Pennsylvania is the head of government of the Commonwealth of Pennsylvania. There have been seven presidents and 48 governors of Pennsylvania, with two governors (Robert E. Pattison and Gifford Pinchot) serving non-consecutive terms, totaling 55 terms in both offices. The longest term was that of the first governor, Thomas Mifflin, who served three full terms as governor in addition to two years as President of the Continental Congress. The shortest term belonged to John C. Bell Jr., who served only 19 days as acting governor after his predecessor, Edward Martin, resigned.

The current governor is Democrat Josh Shapiro, who took office on January 17, 2023.

== Governors ==
Pennsylvania was one of the original Thirteen Colonies and was admitted as a state on December 12, 1787. Before it declared its independence, Pennsylvania was a colony of the Kingdom of Great Britain.

=== Presidents of the Supreme Executive Council ===
The Pennsylvania Constitution of 1776 created the Supreme Executive Council as the state's executive branch, with a president as its head. The president was chosen annually by the council, though with no specific term dates.

The constitution created the position of "vice-president", though no provision was made if the office of the president became vacant, which occurred four times. Contemporary sources continue to label the chief executive in such times as the vice-president, without any notion of succeeding in the presidency. One acting president, George Bryan, was subsequently recognized later as a full-fledged governor, due to his acting as president for over six months.

Presidents of the Supreme Executive Council of Pennsylvania
No.	President	Term in office	Vice-president
1	Thomas Wharton Jr. (1735–1778)	March 5, 1777 – May 23, 1778 (445 days; died in office)	George Bryan
2	George Bryan (1731–1791)	May 23, 1778 – December 22, 1778 (214 days; retired)	acting as president (Note: Four vice-presidents acted as president at various times; however, Bryan's lengthy term has caused his term to since be recognized as being equivalent to president. Contemporary sources listed him only as vice president, acting out the duties of president.)
3	Joseph Reed (1741–1785)	December 22, 1778 – November 15, 1781 (1060 days; term-limited) (Note: Members of the executive council who served three successive years were ineligible to hold the office for four years afterward.)	George Bryan (resigned October 11, 1779)
3	Joseph Reed (1741–1785)	December 22, 1778 – November 15, 1781 (1060 days; term-limited)	Matthew Smith (resigned November 15, 1779)
3	Joseph Reed (1741–1785)	December 22, 1778 – November 15, 1781 (1060 days; term-limited)	William Moore
4	William Moore (1735–1793)	November 15, 1781 – November 7, 1782 (358 days; retired)	James Potter
5	John Dickinson (1732–1808)	November 7, 1782 – October 18, 1785 (1077 days; term-limited)	James Ewing
5	John Dickinson (1732–1808)	November 7, 1782 – October 18, 1785 (1077 days; term-limited)	James Irvine (resigned October 10, 1785)
5	John Dickinson (1732–1808)	November 7, 1782 – October 18, 1785 (1077 days; term-limited)	Charles Biddle
6	Benjamin Franklin (1706–1790)	October 18, 1785 – November 5, 1788 (1115 days; term-limited)	Charles Biddle
6	Benjamin Franklin (1706–1790)	October 18, 1785 – November 5, 1788 (1115 days; term-limited)	Peter Muhlenberg (resigned October 14, 1788)
6	Benjamin Franklin (1706–1790)	October 18, 1785 – November 5, 1788 (1115 days; term-limited)	David Redick
7	Thomas Mifflin (1744–1800)	November 5, 1788 – December 21, 1790 (777 days; elected state governor)	George Ross

=== Governors of the Commonwealth of Pennsylvania ===
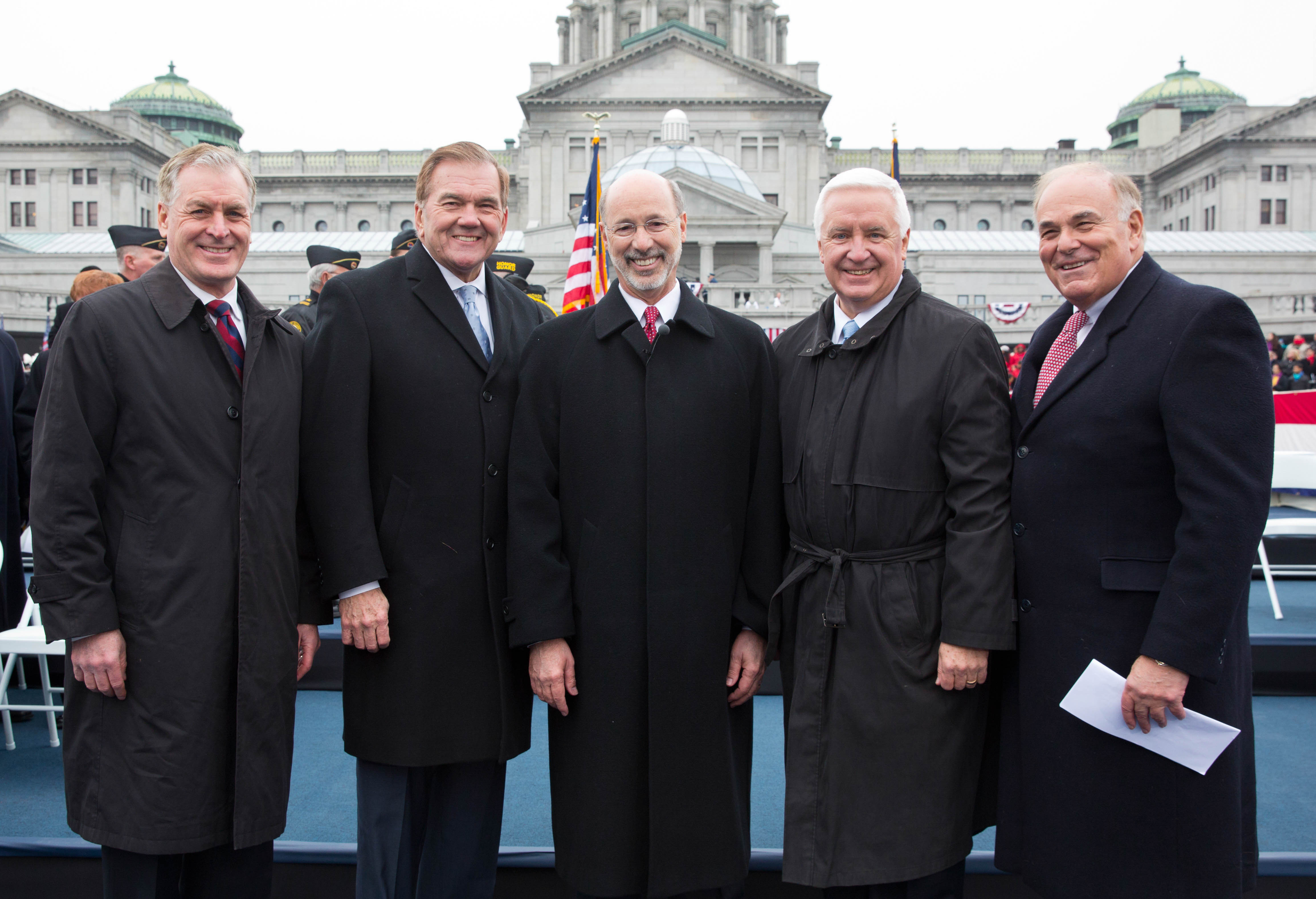
Five governors of the Commonwealth of Pennsylvania who have served since 1995, (left to right): Mark Schweiker, Tom Ridge, Tom Wolf, Tom Corbett and Ed Rendell, pose in front of the east facade of the Pennsylvania State Capitol in Harrisburg at Wolf's January 2015 gubernatorial inauguration

The 1790 constitution abolished the council and replaced the president with a governor, and established a three-year term for governor commencing on the third Tuesday of the December following the election, with governors not allowed to serve more than nine out of any twelve years. The 1838 constitution moved the start of the term to the third Tuesday of the January following the election, and allowed governors to only serve six out of any nine years. The 1874 constitution lengthened the term to four years, and prohibited governors from succeeding themselves. The current constitution of 1968 changed this to allow governors to serve two consecutive terms, with no lifetime limit.

Under the 1968 constitution, Milton Shapp was the first governor to serve two terms, and Tom Corbett was the first incumbent governor to lose a reelection bid.

If the office of governor becomes vacant through death, resignation, or conviction on impeachment, the lieutenant governor becomes governor for the remainder of the term; if the office is only temporarily vacant due to disability of the governor, the lieutenant governor only acts out the duties of governor. Should both offices be vacant, the president pro tempore of the state senate becomes governor. The position of a lieutenant governor was created in the 1874 constitution; prior to then, the speaker of the senate would act as governor in cases of vacancy. Originally, the lieutenant governor could only act as governor; it was not until the 1968 constitution that the lieutenant governor could actually become the sitting governor in that fashion. The office of governor has been vacant for an extended period once before, a 17-day gap in 1848 between the resignation of the previous governor and the swearing in of his acting successor. Governors and lieutenant governors are elected on the same political party ticket.

Governors of the Commonwealth of Pennsylvania
No.	Governor	Term in office	Party	Election	Lt. Governor (Note: The office of lieutenant governor was created in 1873, first being filled in 1875.) (Note: Lieutenant governors represented the same party as their governor unless noted.)
1	Thomas Mifflin (1744–1800)	December 21, 1790 – December 17, 1799 (3284 days; term-limited) (Note: Under the 1790 constitution, governors were ineligible to hold the office longer than nine in any term of twelve years.)	None (Note: The Federalist and Democratic-Republican parties jointly nominated Mifflin, but he himself carried no party label.)	1790	Office did not exist
1	Thomas Mifflin (1744–1800)	December 21, 1790 – December 17, 1799 (3284 days; term-limited)	Democratic- Republican	1793	Office did not exist
1	Thomas Mifflin (1744–1800)	December 21, 1790 – December 17, 1799 (3284 days; term-limited)	Democratic- Republican	1796	Office did not exist
2	Thomas McKean (1734–1817)	December 17, 1799 – December 20, 1808 (3291 days; term-limited)	Democratic- Republican (Note: Dubin and Kallenbach label McKean a Democratic-Republican for 1799 and 1802, and an Independent Democratic-Republican for 1805.)	1799	Office did not exist
2	Thomas McKean (1734–1817)	December 17, 1799 – December 20, 1808 (3291 days; term-limited)	Democratic- Republican	1802	Office did not exist
2	Thomas McKean (1734–1817)	December 17, 1799 – December 20, 1808 (3291 days; term-limited)	Constitutionalist	1805	Office did not exist
3	Simon Snyder (1759–1819)	December 20, 1808 – December 16, 1817 (3284 days; term-limited)	Democratic- Republican	1808	Office did not exist
3	Simon Snyder (1759–1819)	December 20, 1808 – December 16, 1817 (3284 days; term-limited)	Democratic- Republican	1811	Office did not exist
3	Simon Snyder (1759–1819)	December 20, 1808 – December 16, 1817 (3284 days; term-limited)	Democratic- Republican	1814	Office did not exist
4	William Findlay (1768–1846)	December 16, 1817 – December 19, 1820 (1100 days; lost election)	Democratic- Republican	1817	Office did not exist
5	Joseph Hiester (1752–1832)	December 19, 1820 – December 16, 1823 (1093 days; retired)	Federalist (Note: Hiester is labeled an Independent Republican by Dubin, and an Independent Democratic-Republican and Federalist by Glashan.)	1820	Office did not exist
6	John Andrew Shulze (1775–1852)	December 16, 1823 – December 15, 1829 (2192 days; retired)	Democratic- Republican	1823	Office did not exist
6	John Andrew Shulze (1775–1852)	December 16, 1823 – December 15, 1829 (2192 days; retired)	Jacksonian	1826	Office did not exist
7	George Wolf (1777–1840)	December 15, 1829 – December 15, 1835 (2192 days; lost election)	Democratic	1829	Office did not exist
7	George Wolf (1777–1840)	December 15, 1829 – December 15, 1835 (2192 days; lost election)	Democratic	1832	Office did not exist
8	Joseph Ritner (1780–1869)	December 15, 1835 – January 15, 1839 (1128 days; lost election)	Anti-Masonic	1835	Office did not exist
9	David R. Porter (1788–1867)	January 15, 1839 – January 21, 1845 (2199 days; term-limited) (Note: Under the 1838 constitution, governors were ineligible to hold the office longer than six in any term of nine years.)	Democratic	1838	Office did not exist
9	David R. Porter (1788–1867)	January 15, 1839 – January 21, 1845 (2199 days; term-limited)	Democratic	1841	Office did not exist
10	Francis R. Shunk (1788–1848)	January 21, 1845 – July 9, 1848 (1266 days; resigned) (Note: Shunk resigned due to illness; he died of tuberculosis 11 days later.)	Democratic	1844	Office did not exist
10	Francis R. Shunk (1788–1848)	January 21, 1845 – July 9, 1848 (1266 days; resigned)	Democratic	1847	Office did not exist
11	William F. Johnston (1808–1872)	July 9, 1848 (Note: Shunk resigned on July 9, and as Speaker of the Senate, Johnston became acting governor. He arrived in Harrisburg to be formally sworn in on July 26.) – January 20, 1852 (1291 days; lost election)	Whig	Speaker of the Senate acting	Office did not exist
11	William F. Johnston (1808–1872)	July 9, 1848 – January 20, 1852 (1291 days; lost election)	Whig	1848	Office did not exist
12	William Bigler (1814–1880)	January 20, 1852 – January 16, 1855 (1093 days; lost election)	Democratic	1851	Office did not exist
13	James Pollock (1810–1890)	January 16, 1855 – January 19, 1858 (1100 days; retired)	Whig (Note: Pollock also represented the American Party.)	1854	Office did not exist
14	William F. Packer (1807–1870)	January 19, 1858 – January 15, 1861 (1093 days; retired)	Democratic	1857	Office did not exist
15	Andrew Gregg Curtin (1815–1894)	January 15, 1861 – January 15, 1867 (2192 days; term-limited)	Republican	1860	Office did not exist
15	Andrew Gregg Curtin (1815–1894)	January 15, 1861 – January 15, 1867 (2192 days; term-limited)	Republican	1863	Office did not exist
16	John W. Geary (1819–1873)	January 15, 1867 – January 21, 1873 (2199 days; term-limited)	Republican	1866	Office did not exist
16	John W. Geary (1819–1873)	January 15, 1867 – January 21, 1873 (2199 days; term-limited)	Republican	1869	Office did not exist
17	John F. Hartranft (1830–1889)	January 21, 1873 – January 21, 1879 (2192 days; term-limited) (Note: Under the 1874 constitution, governors were ineligible to the office for the next succeeding term.)	Republican	1872	Office did not exist
17	John F. Hartranft (1830–1889)	January 21, 1873 – January 21, 1879 (2192 days; term-limited)	Republican	1875	John Latta
18	Henry M. Hoyt (1830–1892)	January 21, 1879 – January 16, 1883 (1457 days; term-limited)	Republican	1878	Charles W. Stone
19	Robert E. Pattison (1850–1904)	January 16, 1883 – January 18, 1887 (1464 days; term-limited)	Democratic	1882	Chauncey Forward Black
20	James A. Beaver (1837–1914)	January 18, 1887 – January 20, 1891 (1464 days; term-limited)	Republican	1886	William T. Davies
19	Robert E. Pattison (1850–1904)	January 20, 1891 – January 15, 1895 (1457 days; term-limited)	Democratic	1890	Louis Arthur Watres
21	Daniel H. Hastings (1849–1903)	January 15, 1895 – January 17, 1899 (1464 days; term-limited)	Republican	1894	Walter Lyon
22	William A. Stone (1846–1920)	January 17, 1899 – January 20, 1903 (1464 days; term-limited)	Republican	1898	John P. S. Gobin
23	Samuel W. Pennypacker (1843–1916)	January 20, 1903 – January 15, 1907 (1457 days; term-limited)	Republican	1902	William M. Brown
24	Edwin Sydney Stuart (1853–1937)	January 15, 1907 – January 17, 1911 (1464 days; term-limited)	Republican	1906	Robert S. Murphy
25	John K. Tener (1863–1946)	January 17, 1911 – January 19, 1915 (1464 days; term-limited)	Republican	1910	John Merriman Reynolds
26	Martin Grove Brumbaugh (1862–1930)	January 19, 1915 – January 21, 1919 (1464 days; term-limited)	Republican	1914	Frank B. McClain
27	William Cameron Sproul (1870–1928)	January 21, 1919 – January 16, 1923 (1457 days; term-limited)	Republican	1918	Edward E. Beidleman
28	Gifford Pinchot (1865–1946)	January 16, 1923 – January 18, 1927 (1464 days; term-limited)	Republican	1922	David J. Davis
29	John Stuchell Fisher (1867–1940)	January 18, 1927 – January 20, 1931 (1464 days; term-limited)	Republican	1926	Arthur James
28	Gifford Pinchot (1865–1946)	January 20, 1931 – January 15, 1935 (1457 days; term-limited)	Republican	1930	Edward C. Shannon
30	George Howard Earle III (1890–1974)	January 15, 1935 – January 17, 1939 (1464 days; term-limited) (Note: Earle, being term-limited, had already lost election to the United States Senate when his term ended.)	Democratic	1934	Thomas Kennedy
31	Arthur James (1883–1973)	January 17, 1939 – January 19, 1943 (1464 days; term-limited)	Republican	1938	Samuel S. Lewis
32	Edward Martin (1879–1967)	January 19, 1943 – January 2, 1947 (1445 days; resigned) (Note: Martin resigned, having been elected to the United States Senate.)	Republican	1942	John C. Bell Jr.
33	John C. Bell Jr. (1892–1974)	January 2, 1947 – January 21, 1947 (20 days; retired)	Republican	Succeeded from lieutenant governor	Vacant
34	James H. Duff (1883–1969)	January 21, 1947 – January 16, 1951 (1457 days; term-limited) (Note: Duff, being term-limited, had already been elected to the United States Senate when his term ended.)	Republican	1946	Daniel Strickler
35	John S. Fine (1893–1978)	January 16, 1951 – January 18, 1955 (1464 days; term-limited)	Republican	1950	Lloyd H. Wood
36	George M. Leader (1918–2013)	January 18, 1955 – January 20, 1959 (1464 days; term-limited)	Democratic	1954	Roy E. Furman
37	David L. Lawrence (1889–1966)	January 20, 1959 – January 15, 1963 (1457 days; term-limited)	Democratic	1958	John Morgan Davis
38	William Scranton (1917–2013)	January 15, 1963 – January 17, 1967 (1464 days; term-limited)	Republican	1962	Raymond P. Shafer
39	Raymond P. Shafer (1917–2006)	January 17, 1967 – January 19, 1971 (1464 days; term-limited)	Republican	1966	Raymond J. Broderick
40	Milton Shapp (1912–1994)	January 19, 1971 – January 16, 1979 (2920 days; term-limited) (Note: Under a 1967 amendment to the constitution, governors may succeed themselves for one additional term.)	Democratic	1970	Ernest Kline
40	Milton Shapp (1912–1994)	January 19, 1971 – January 16, 1979 (2920 days; term-limited)	Democratic	1974	Ernest Kline
41	Dick Thornburgh (1932–2020)	January 16, 1979 – January 20, 1987 (2927 days; term-limited)	Republican	1978	William Scranton III
41	Dick Thornburgh (1932–2020)	January 16, 1979 – January 20, 1987 (2927 days; term-limited)	Republican	1982	William Scranton III
42	Bob Casey Sr. (1932–2000)	January 20, 1987 – January 17, 1995 (2920 days; term-limited)	Democratic	1986	Mark Singel (Note: Singel acted as governor from June 14 to December 21, 1993, while Casey recovered from a heart-liver transplant.)
42	Bob Casey Sr. (1932–2000)	January 20, 1987 – January 17, 1995 (2920 days; term-limited)	Democratic	1990	Mark Singel
43	Tom Ridge (b. 1945)	January 17, 1995 – October 5, 2001 (2454 days; resigned) (Note: Ridge resigned, having been appointed Director of the Office of Homeland Security.)	Republican	1994	Mark Schweiker
43	Tom Ridge (b. 1945)	January 17, 1995 – October 5, 2001 (2454 days; resigned)	Republican	1998	Mark Schweiker
44	Mark Schweiker (b. 1953)	October 5, 2001 – January 21, 2003 (474 days; retired)	Republican	Succeeded from lieutenant governor	Robert Jubelirer
45	Ed Rendell (b. 1944)	January 21, 2003 – January 18, 2011 (2920 days; term-limited)	Democratic	2002	Catherine Baker Knoll (died November 12, 2008)
45	Ed Rendell (b. 1944)	January 21, 2003 – January 18, 2011 (2920 days; term-limited)	Democratic	2006	Catherine Baker Knoll (died November 12, 2008)
45	Ed Rendell (b. 1944)	January 21, 2003 – January 18, 2011 (2920 days; term-limited)	Democratic	2006	Joe Scarnati (Note: Represented the Republican Party) (acting)
46	Tom Corbett (b. 1949)	January 18, 2011 – January 20, 2015 (1464 days; lost election)	Republican	2010	Jim Cawley
47	Tom Wolf (b. 1948)	January 20, 2015 – January 17, 2023 (2920 days; term-limited)	Democratic	2014	Mike Stack
47	Tom Wolf (b. 1948)	January 20, 2015 – January 17, 2023 (2920 days; term-limited)	Democratic	2018	John Fetterman (resigned January 3, 2023)
47	Tom Wolf (b. 1948)	January 20, 2015 – January 17, 2023 (2920 days; term-limited)	Democratic	2018	Kim Ward (acting)
48	Josh Shapiro (b. 1973)	January 17, 2023 – Incumbent (Note: Shapiro's term will expire on January 19, 2027; he was elected to a second term on November 3, 2026.) (in office 1406 days)	Democratic	2022	Austin Davis
48	Josh Shapiro (b. 1973)	January 17, 2023 – Incumbent (in office 1406 days)	Democratic	2026	Austin Davis

== Timeline ==
Timeline of Pennsylvania governors

== See also ==
- Gubernatorial lines of succession in the United States § Pennsylvania
- List of Pennsylvania gubernatorial elections
- First ladies of Pennsylvania
- Lieutenant Governor of Pennsylvania
- List of colonial governors of Pennsylvania
- List of Pennsylvania state legislatures

== Sources ==
- "Former Pennsylvania Governors". National Governors Association.
- "Pennsylvania Constitution". State Democracy Research Initiative. University of Wisconsin Law School.
- Dubin, Michael J. (2003). United States Gubernatorial Elections, 1776–1860: The Official Results by State and County. McFarland. ISBN 0-7864-1439-1 – via Internet Archive.
- Glashan, Roy R. (1979). American Governors and Gubernatorial Elections, 1775-1978. Meckler Books. ISBN 0-7201-1511-6 – via Internet Archive.
- Kallenbach, Joseph E.; Kallenbach, Jessamine S. (1977). American State Governors, 1776-1976. Oceana Publications. ISBN 978-0-379-00665-0 – via Internet Archive.
- Mullaney, Marie Marmo (1994). Biographical Directory of the Governors of the United States, 1988–1994. Greenwood Publishing Group. ISBN 0-313-28312-5 – via Internet Archive.
- Sobel, Robert; Raimo, John (1978). Biographical Directory of the Governors of the United States, 1789-1978. Vol. 3. Meckler Books. ISBN 0-930466-01-2 – via Internet Archive.
- Thorpe, Francis Newton, ed. (1909). The Federal and State Constitutions, Colonial Charters, and Other Organic Laws of the States, Territories, and Colonies Now or Heretofore Forming the United States of America. Vol. 5. United States Government Publishing Office – via Internet Archive.
