= John Bannister Gibson =

American judge

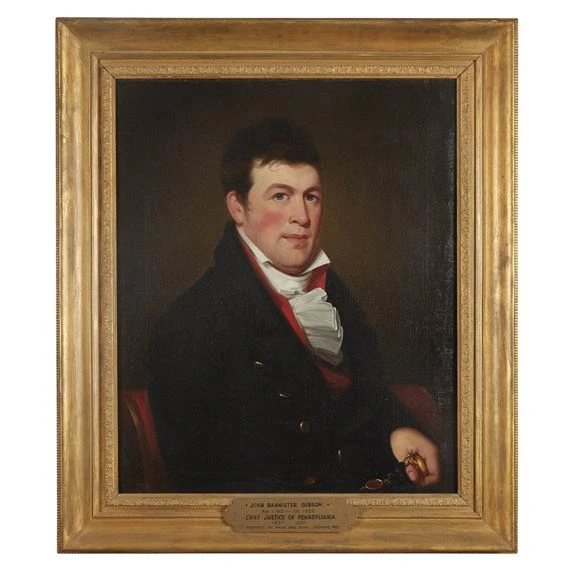

Chief Justice of the Supreme Court of Pennsylvania
- In office 1827–1851
- Preceded by: William Tilghman
- Succeeded by: Jeremiah S. Black

Associate Justice of the Supreme Court of Pennsylvania
- In office 1816–1827
- In office 1851–1853

Member of the Pennsylvania House of Representatives
- In office 1810–1812
- Constituency: Cumberland County

Chair of the Pennsylvania House Judiciary Committee
- In office 1811–1812

Personal details
- Born: November 8, 1780 Cumberland County, Pennsylvania, US
- Died: May 3, 1853 (aged 72) Philadelphia, Pennsylvania
- Party: Democratic
- Spouse: Sarah Work Galbraith
- Relations: General George Gibson (brother)
- Children: Eight
- Education: Dickinson College

John Bannister Gibson (November 8, 1780 – May 3, 1853) was a Pennsylvania jurist. He served on the Pennsylvania Supreme Court from 1816 to his death in 1853, and was chief justice on the court for 24 years. "During his highly influential career, he wrote more than twelve hundred opinions and was known for maintaining a generally restrictive view of judicial authority, [and] aiding measures for internal improvements and public works"[.] With some reluctance, Gibson also strictly followed precedent and legal text to deny the franchise to Pennsylvania’s free persons of African descent (Hobbs v. Fogg, 6 Watts 553 (Pa. 1837)).

== Early life ==
Born in what is now Perry County, Pennsylvania (in 1780 it was part of Cumberland County), Gibson was named for John Banister, a Virginia hero of the American Revolution. Gibson's father, George Gibson, also fought in the war and remained in service after its end. George Gibson was killed at St. Clair's defeat in an expedition to the Great Black Swamp in northwest Ohio during the Northwest Indian Wars, when his son John was eleven years old.

In 1795 or 1796, Gibson was sent to Dickinson College in Carlisle, Pennsylvania, where he remained about four years. Apparently Gibson did not take his degree. Justice Hugh Brackenridge of the state Supreme Court, who lived in Carlisle, took some notice of the tall and awkward young student, and gave him the use of his library, the best in the town, which Gibson greatly appreciated.

On leaving college, Gibson read law in Carlisle, in the office of Thomas Duncan. In 1803, Gibson was admitted to the bar in Cumberland County, and later in the same year at Pittsburgh. In 1804, he was admitted in Beaver County, and he also practiced for a short time in Hagerstown, Maryland.

== Service in General Assembly ==
In 1809, Gibson was elected as a Democrat from Cumberland County to the House of Representatives of the Pennsylvania General Assembly, and again in 1810. He served for the 1810-1811, and 1811-1812 terms of the Assembly. As chairman of the House Judiciary Committee, he secured the passage of the Act of 1812, abolishing survivorship as an incident of joint tenancy (Pennsylvania Act of Mar. 31, 1812, P.L. 259, No. 194, Cl. 68).

While serving in the Assembly, Gibson represented an enslaved four-year-old boy named John, arguing that he should be freed under Pennsylvania Law (Commonwealth v. Blaine, 4 Binn. 186 (Pa. 1811)) because "[t]he most strict conformity with the Pennsylvania Act for the Gradual Abolition of Slavery . . . should be required in favor of liberty." The state supreme court, however, ruled in favor of John's enslaver.

== Personal ==
Gibson was married in 1812 to Sarah Work Galbraith of Carlisle. They had eight children, five of whom survived to adulthood. He was active in his local Episcopal Church and was grand master of the Grand Lodge of Pennsylvania in 1824.

== Judicial career ==
In 1813, Governor Simon Snyder appointed Gibson as judge of the trial-level Court of Common Pleas of the new Eleventh judicial district, which included Tioga, Bradford, Susquehanna, and Luzerne counties. Gibson took up his residence at Wilkes-Barre, where he first held court in a log-house.

=== Pennsylvania Supreme Court service ===
On June 27, 1816, he was appointed by Governor Simon Snyder as an associate-justice of the Supreme Court, to fill the place vacated by the death of his friend, Hugh Brackenridge. He joined Chief Justice William Tilghman and Justice Jasper Yeates. Placed, at the age of thirty-six, in so responsible and dignified a position, and brought into close contact with the wide learning and experience of these veteran justices, Gibson quickly realized his deficiencies. He studied laboriously during the first years of his service on the supreme bench, and became engrossed in the law. He acquired a vast and accurate knowledge which gave him, as the years passed, a sureness and mastery, rarely equaled by any judge, in dealing with all questions presented.

Gibson's first opinion on the supreme court was a concurrence that the Pennsylvania-born child of a fugitive slave from Maryland was free, and that neither she nor her mother could be returned to the mother's former enslaver. (Commonwealth (ex rel. Eliza) v. Holloway, 2 Serg. & Rawl. 305, 308 (Pa. 1816)).

In 1817, on the death of Justice Yeates, Thomas Duncan was appointed to the vacancy, largely, it is supposed, through the influence of Gibson. He served with his preceptor on the bench as his junior associate. Gibson was promoted to Chief Justice in 1827.

A constitutional amendment in 1838 changed the tenure of office of the Supreme Court justices from life to a term of fifteen years. It provided that the commissions of the justices then in office should expire at intervals of three years, in the order of their seniority as of January 1, 1839. Justice Gibson had opposed this change on broad grounds of public policy. At the suggestion of his associates, he resigned and was reappointed by Governor Joseph Ritner in 1838, thus prolonging his term by several years. This action was criticized by the newspapers.

An 1850 state constitutional amendment provided that the justices of the Supreme Court should be elected instead of being appointed by the governor. At the Democratic Party convention in 1851, the only member of the existing court who was placed upon the ticket was Chief Justice Gibson.

"The nomination," says Judge Porter, "was an act of high homage to his character. It was the result of that feeling. He was more than seventy years of age, too old, if he had been willing, to accomplish by his own energy anything to promote his nomination, and as unacquainted as a child with partisan politics and with party leaders. In one sense, the nomination was a rebuke to himself. He had seldom lost an opportunity to express his want of confidence in popular action, and his disapprobation of every movement designed to enlarge the boundaries of popular power. He took as little pains to conceal his sentiments on this point as on all others, and while he expressed them decorously he uttered them boldly. It must, therefore, have cost him some surprise, if not compunction, to find that carrying into effect the very movement of which he had most horror, the people, through their representatives, chose to retain their hold of him as one of their most important public servants."

The justices drew lots for the terms, the law providing that one of them should go out of office every three years. Jeremiah Black drew the shortest term, and with it the office of chief justice. Gibson was commissioned as associate in the court where he had sat as chief justice for twenty-four years.

=== Honors ===
Gibson received an honorary LL.D. from the University of Pennsylvania in 1838, and another from Harvard University in 1847. Gibson was posthumously honored by inclusion of his name on a mosaic in the Thomas Jefferson Building of the Library of Congress in Washington, D.C., along with nine other highly-distinguished American lawyers and judges (see picture in gallery, below).

== Death and memorial ==
Soon after his election as justice, Gibson became severely ill. His mind was sharp, but he was physically frail. In the spring of 1853, he went to Philadelphia, against the advice of his physicians, to attend the meeting of the court. He died there on May 3, in his room in the United States Hotel, which formerly occupied what is now 419-423 Chestnut Street. Gibson was buried at the Old Graveyard in Carlisle, close to the graves of his colleagues, justices Brackenridge and Duncan.

There are inscriptions on three sides of the four-sided obelisk marking his burial place:

JOHN BANNISTER GIBSON, L.L.D.
for many years
Chief Justice of Pennsylvania
Born Nov. 8, 1780
Died May 3, 1853
=
His intimate Friends
Forget the fame of his Judicial career
In the more cherished recollection
of his Social Character
And his bereaved Family
Dedicate this stone
To the perpetual memory
of
The affectionate Husband
and
The kind Father
=
In the various knowledge
which forms the perfect SCHOLAR
He had no superior
Independent, upright, and able
He had all the highest qualities
of a great JUDGE
In the difficult science of Jurisprudence
He mastered every Department
Discussed almost every question, and
Touched no subject which he did not adorn
He won in early manhood
And retained to the close of a long life
The affection of his Brethren on the Bench
The respect of the Bar
And the confidence of the People

== Papers ==
Some of Gibson's correspondence can be found in the Library of Congress.

== Gallery ==
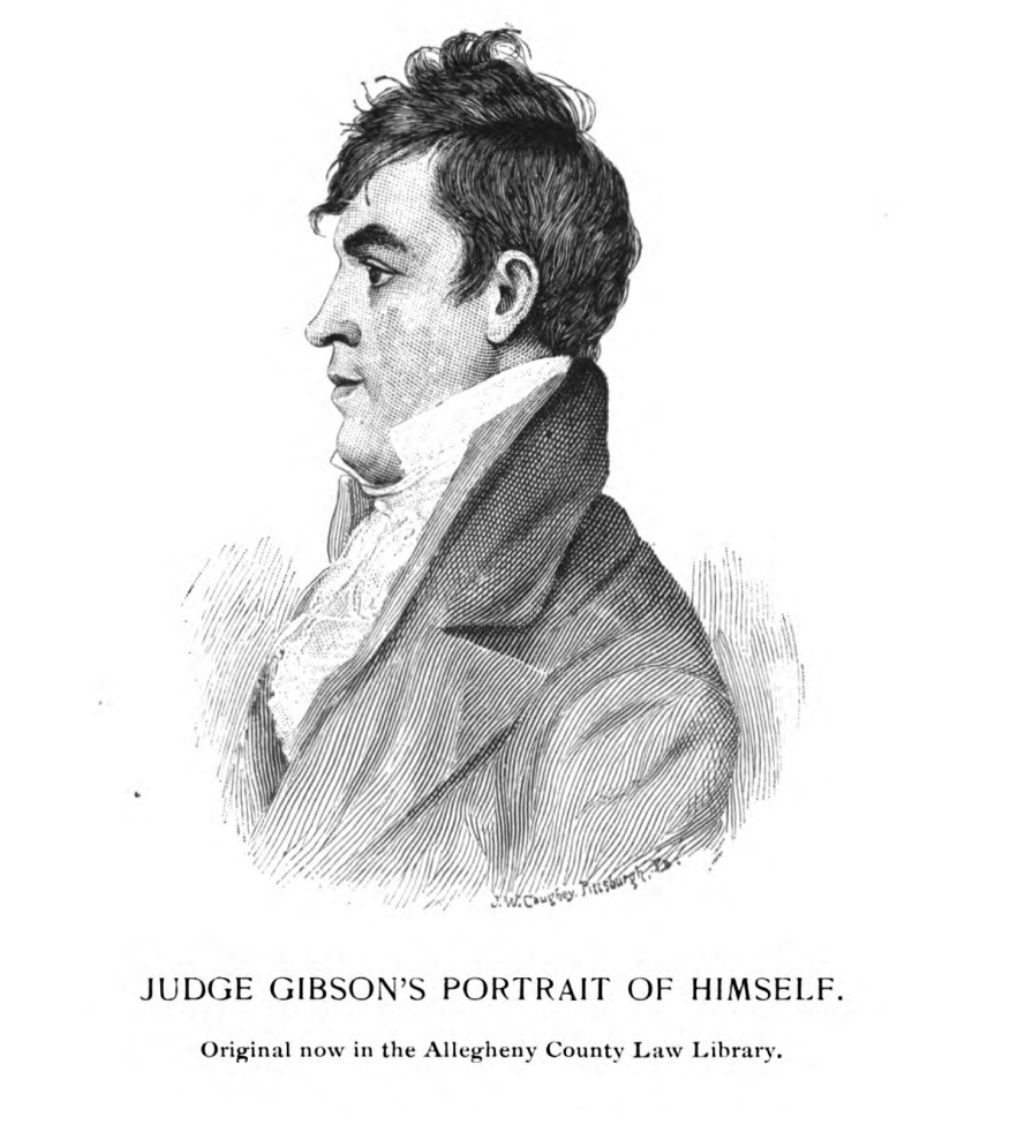
Self-portrait by Gibson at about age 21, ca. 1801

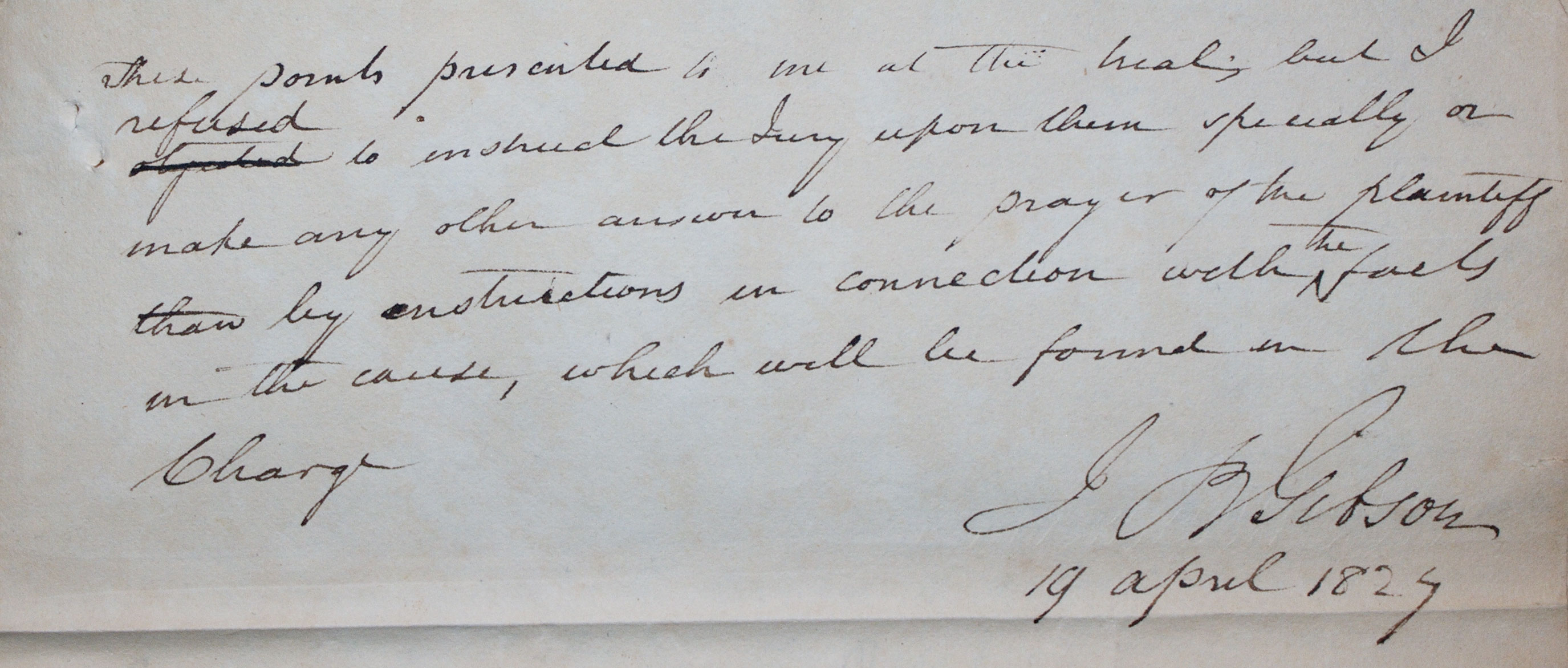
Signature of Gibson on a paper regarding jury instructions, April 19, 1827. (From the private collection of H. Blair Howell.)

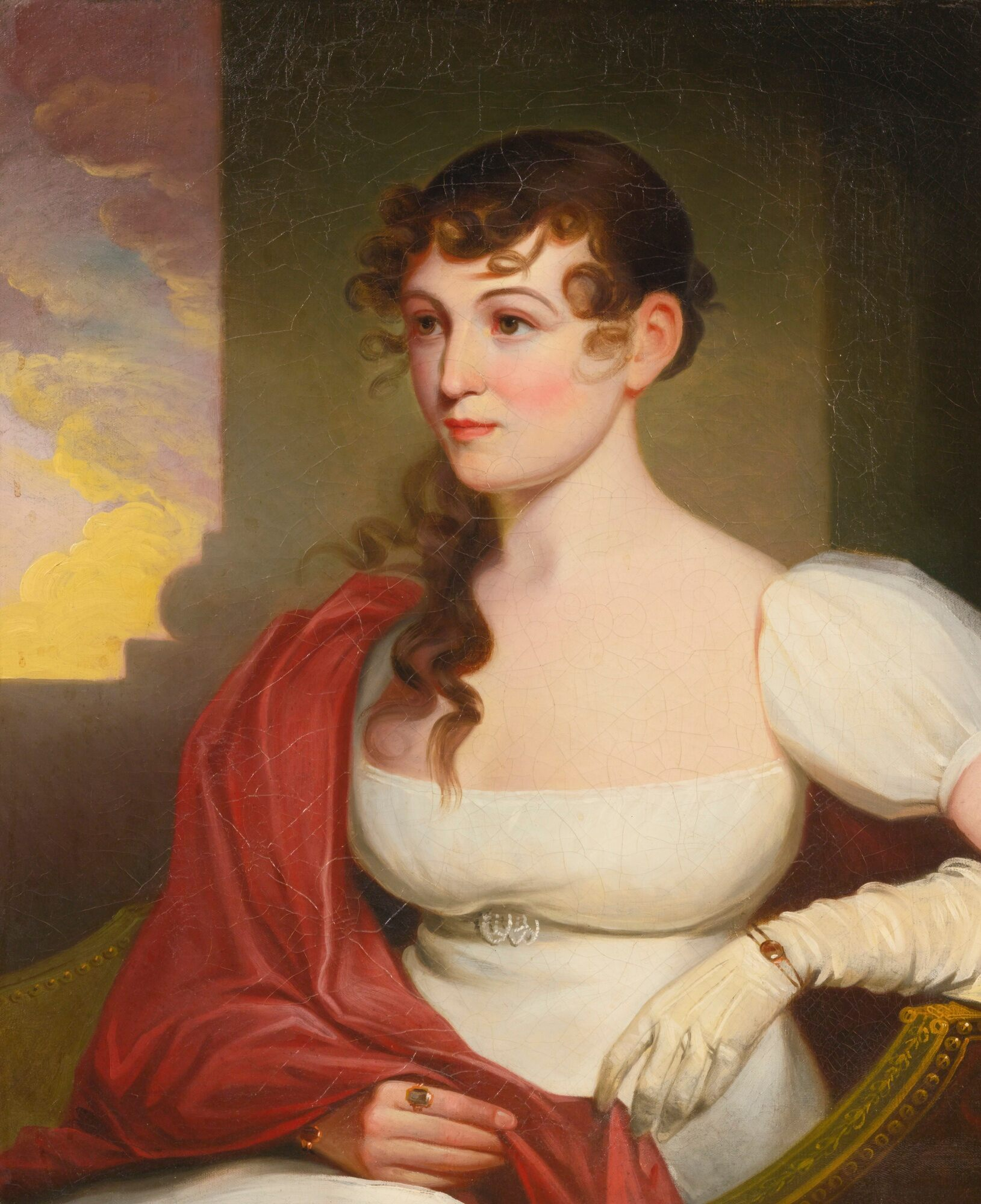
Gibson's wife Sarah Work Galbraith, by Jacob Eichholtz, ca. 1820

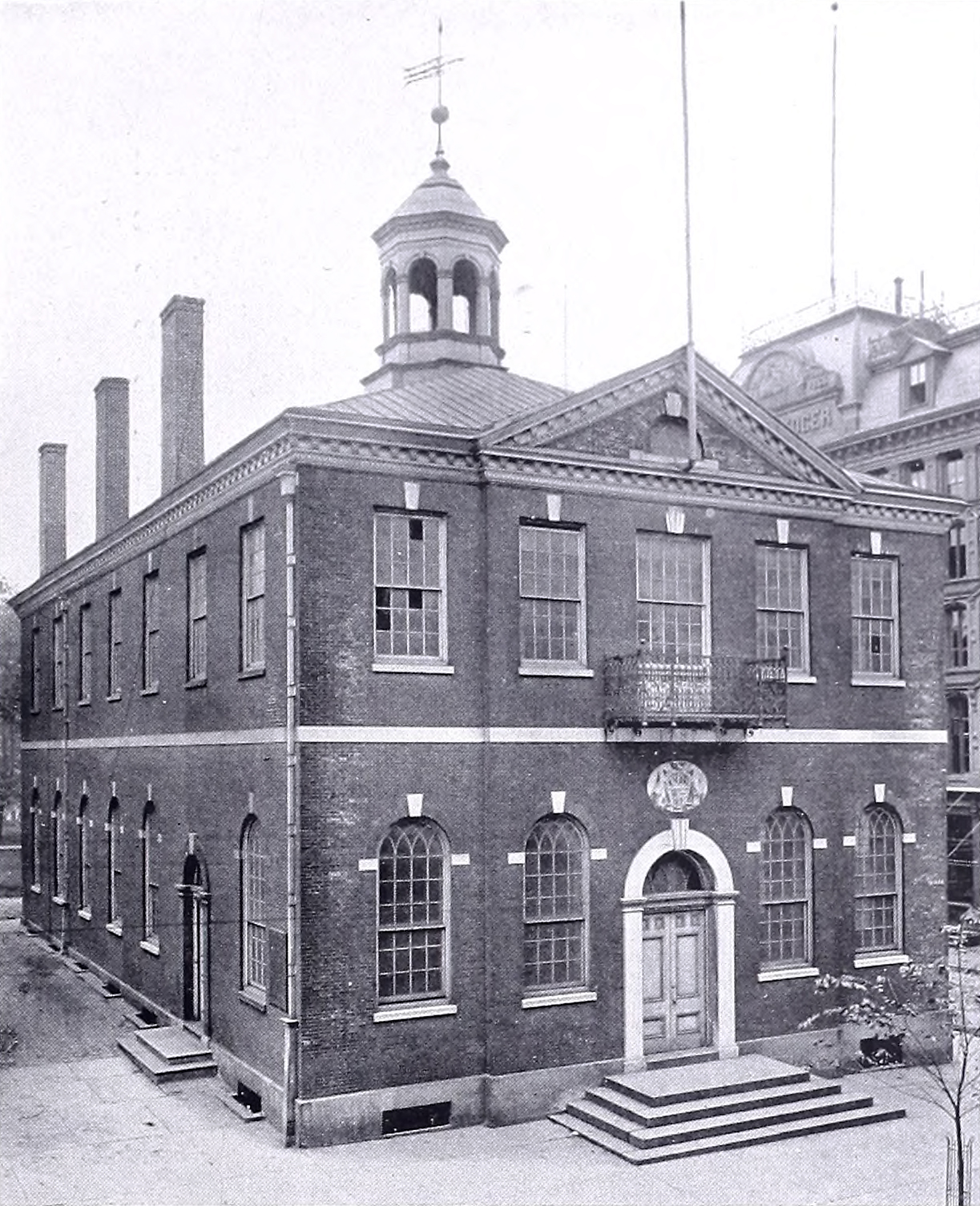
Congress Hall in Philadelphia, home of the state supreme court from 1824 to the end of Gibson's term. During the first years of his judicial service the court met in Independence Hall.

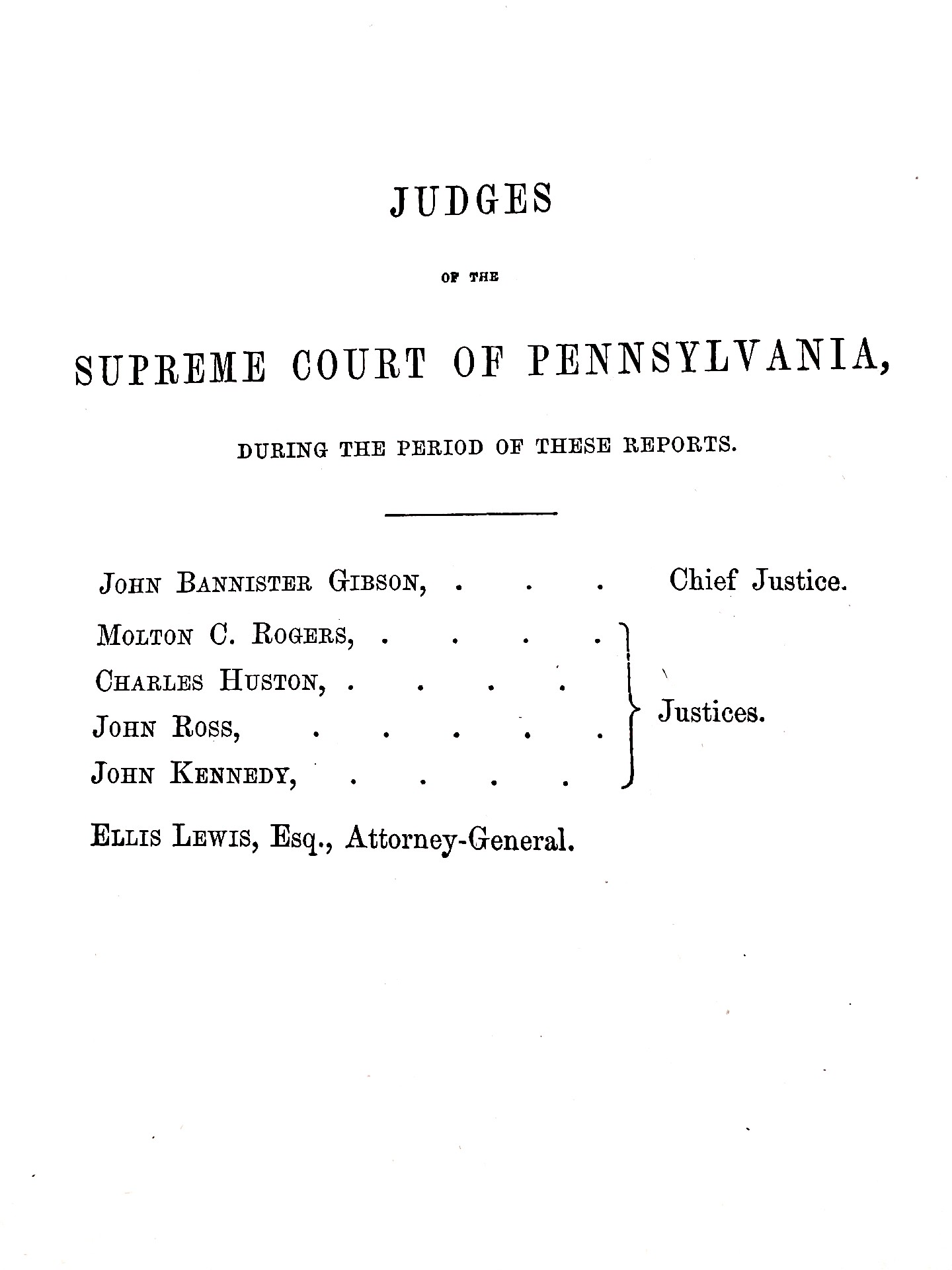
Frontispiece of published opinions of the Pennsylvania Supreme Court ca. 1831 showing Gibson as Chief Justice

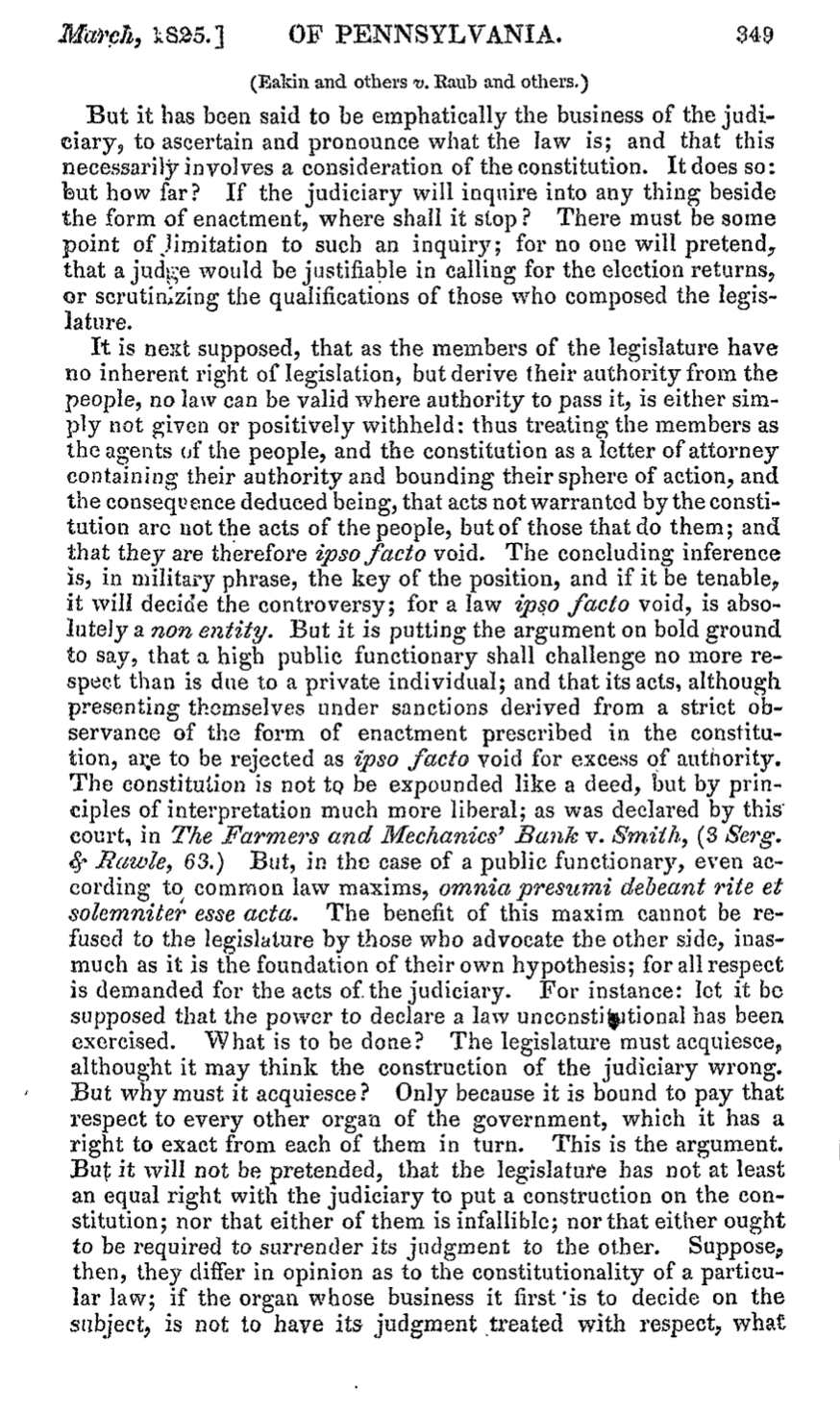
Part of Gibson's dissent in Eakin v. Raub (1825)

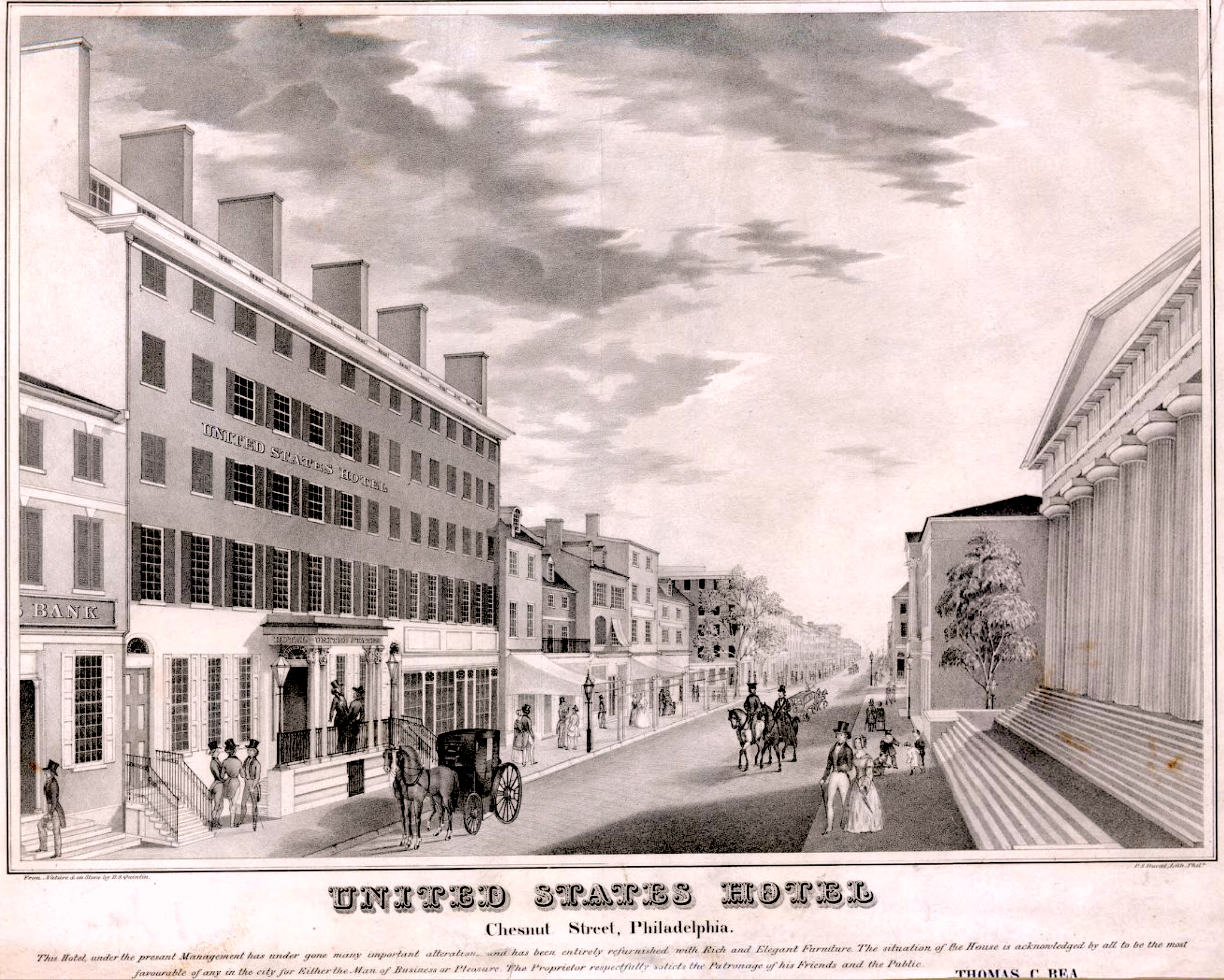
The United States Hotel (left), Philadelphia, site of Gibson's death in 1853

Library of Congress ceiling mosaic naming Gibson (upper left) along with other distinguished American lawyers and judges, by Frederick Dielman, Thomas Jefferson Building, East Corridor, Great Hall, ca. 1897

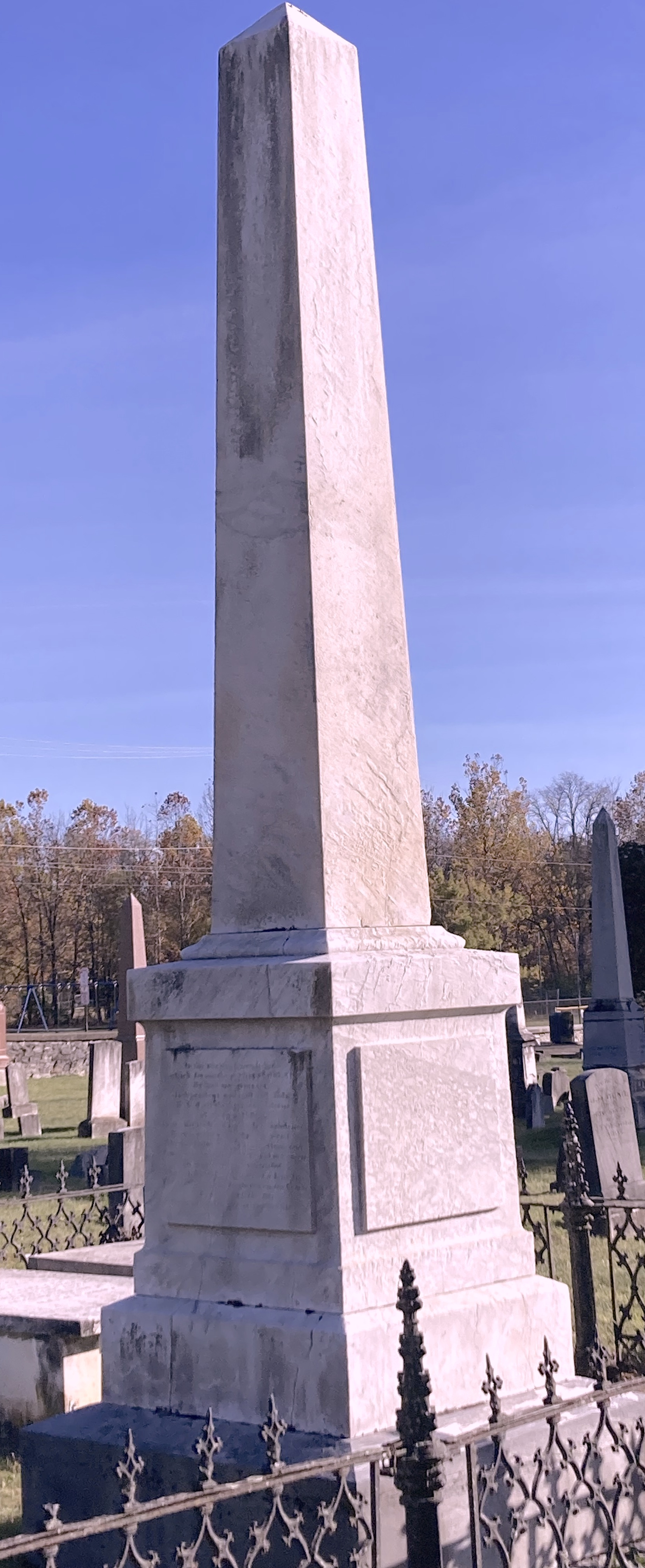
Gibson's grave monument at the Old Graveyard in Carlisle, Pennsylvania.

== See also ==
- Eakin v. Raub
- Black suffrage in Pennsylvania

== Sources ==
This work incorporates material from Samuel Dreher Matlack, "JOHN BANNISTER GIBSON. 1780-1853" in William Draper Lewis, Great American Lawyers (1909), pp. 351–404.

Legal offices
Preceded by William Tilghman	Chief Justice of the Pennsylvania Supreme Court; 1827 – 1851	Succeeded by Jeremiah S. Black
