= Governor Snyder =

Governor Snyder may refer to:

- Rick Snyder (born 1958), Governor of Michigan (2011–2019)
- Simon Snyder (1759–1819), Governor of Pennsylvania (1808–1817)
