= Eakin v. Raub =

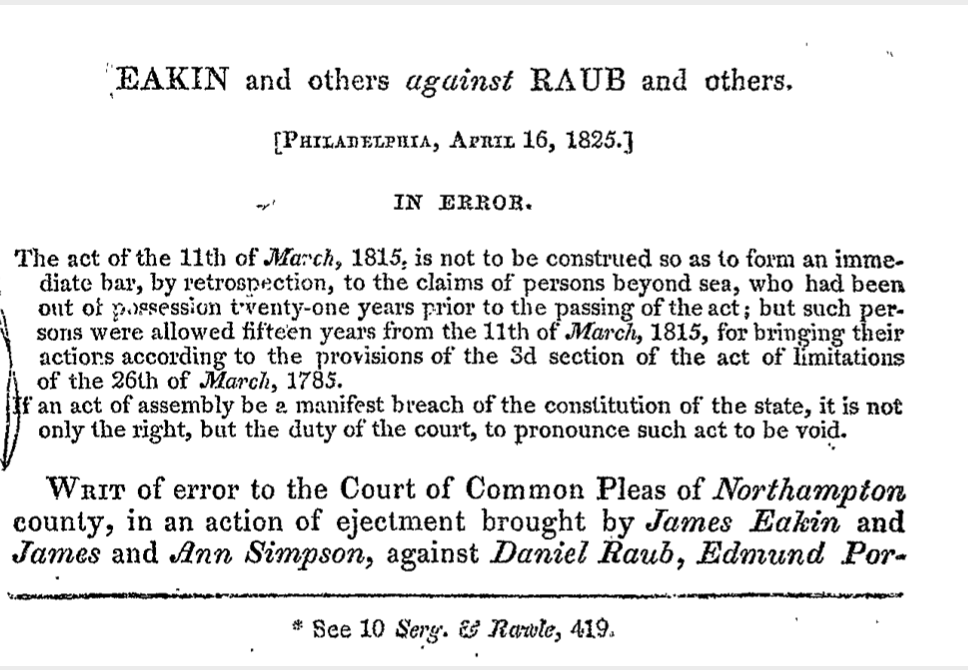
Start of the Pennsylvania supreme court opinions in Eakin v. Raub (1825)

Eakin v. Raub, 12 Sergeant & Rawle 330 (Pa. 1825), was a Pennsylvania Supreme Court case that ruled that the state supreme court had the right to review legislative acts and declare those acts as void if they contradict the state's constitution. Through this decision, the court adopted an approach to judicial review consistent with the 1803 ruling of Marbury v. Madison. The case is most notable for the dissent of Judicial Review from Justice John Bannister Gibson, which challenged the position that a supreme court should be the final arbiter of constitutional questions.

The case was initially filed in the Court of Common Pleas for Northampton County, Pennsylvania, by James Eakin and Ann Simpson in an attempt to achieve an ejectment of Daniel Raub, Edmund Porter, Samuel Sitgreaves, Hugh Ross, John Lippens and John Ross, who owned property in Pennsylvania while residing overseas.
