= William Tilghman =

American judge (1756–1827)

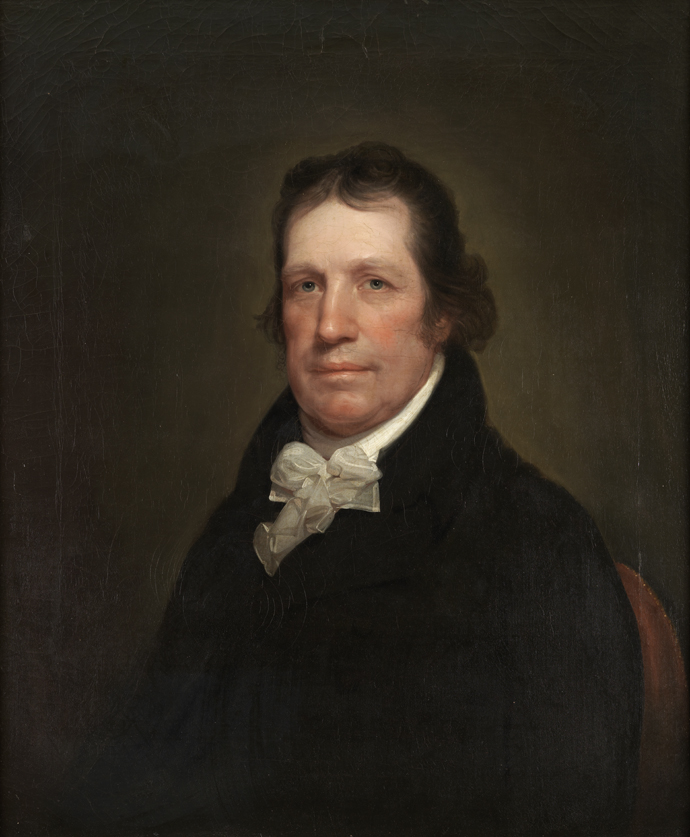
- portrait by Rembrandt Peale

Chief Justice of the Supreme Court of Pennsylvania
- In office 1806–1827
- Preceded by: Edward Shippen IV
- Succeeded by: John Bannister Gibson

Chief Judge of the United States Circuit Court for the Third Circuit
- In office March 3, 1801 – March 8, 1802
- Appointed by: John Adams
- Preceded by: Seat established by 2 Stat. 89
- Succeeded by: Seat abolished

Personal details
- Born: William Tilghman; August 12, 1756 Talbot County, Province of Maryland, British America
- Died: April 29, 1827 (aged 70) Philadelphia, Pennsylvania
- Relatives: Matthew Tilghman; Tench Tilghman
- Education: University of Pennsylvania (A.B., M.A.) read law

William Tilghman (August 12, 1756 – April 29, 1827) was the Chief United States circuit judge of the United States Circuit Court for the Third Circuit and chief justice of the Supreme Court of Pennsylvania.

== Education and career ==
Born on August 12, 1756, in Talbot County, Province of Maryland, British America, Tilghman received an Artium Baccalaureus degree in 1772 from the College of Philadelphia (now the University of Pennsylvania), received a Master of Arts degree from the same institution and read law in 1783. He entered private practice in Talbot County, Maryland from 1783 to 1788. He was a delegate to the Maryland State Convention of 1788, to vote whether Maryland should ratify the proposed Constitution of the United States. He was a member of the Maryland House of Delegates from 1788 to 1790. He was a member of the Maryland Senate from 1791 to 1793. He resumed private practice in Philadelphia, Pennsylvania from 1794 to 1801.

== Federal judicial service ==
Tilghman was nominated by President John Adams on February 26, 1801, to the United States Circuit Court for the Third Circuit, to the new Chief Judge seat authorized by 2 Stat. 89. He was confirmed by the United States Senate on March 2, 1801, and received his commission on March 3, 1801. His service terminated on July 1, 1802, due to abolition of the court.

== Later career ==
Following his departure from the federal bench, Tilghman resumed private practice in Philadelphia from 1802 to 1805. He was President Judge of the Pennsylvania Court of Common Pleas for the First Judicial District in 1805. He was a Judge of the Pennsylvania High Court of Errors and Appeals until 1806. He was chief justice of the Supreme Court of Pennsylvania from 1806 to 1827.

=== Rulings on slavery and emancipation ===
In 1780, Pennsylvania had passed a law for gradual abolition of slavery, and Tilghman as a justice ruled in several freedom suits. The law required the registration of existing slaves at the time, who were considered "servants for life," and of children born in future years to former slave women now considered servants for life. While legally free at birth, such children were required to provide 28 years of what was effectively indentured service to their mother's master before attaining full freedom as adults. Questions related to registration and its influence on freedom of individuals came to be settled by judicial interpretation. Tilghman eventually dominated the court.

Before him, justices had argued that the registration requirements of gradual emancipation law should be strictly construed, and resolved in favor of liberty for plaintiffs. Tilghman disagreed and as early as 1810, began to move the court to a more neutral stance that gave more weight to property rights. After about a decade, he appeared to consider the act to be in aid of "adjustment of interests." In two freedom suits, he demonstrated his agreement with the "legislative recognition of masters' qualified property rights." When John Bannister Gibson succeeded Tilghman as Chief Justice, he argued more in favor of liberty in such cases.

In 1811, perhaps because of his campaign for election as governor, Tilghman began emancipating slaves he still held on plantations in Maryland, but he was overall a weak anti-slavery figure.

== Death ==
Coat of Arms of William Tilghman

Tilghman died on April 29, 1827, in Philadelphia.

== Family ==
Tilghman was the nephew of Matthew Tilghman and brother of Tench Tilghman.

== Memberships ==
In 1816, Tilghman was elected a member of the American Antiquarian Society. In 1805, he was elected a member of the American Philosophical Society in Philadelphia and served as its president from 1824 to his death in 1827.

== See also ==
- Freedom suits

Party political offices
Preceded by James Ross	Federalist nominee for Governor of Pennsylvania; 1811	Succeeded by Isaac Wayne
Legal offices
Preceded by Seat established by 2 Stat. 89	Chief Judge of the United States Circuit Court for the Third Circuit; 1801–1802	Succeeded by Seat abolished
Preceded by Edward Shippen IV	Chief Justice of the Supreme Court of Pennsylvania; 1806–1827	Succeeded by John Bannister Gibson
