= Tertium quids =

Various dissident factions in the 19th-century Democratic-Republican Party

Old Republicans
- Leaders: Morgan Lewis; John Randolph; John Taylor; Nathaniel Macon
- Founded: c.1801; 225 years ago
- Dissolved: c.1828; 198 years ago
- Merged into: Jacksonian Democrats
- Ideology: Anti-corruption; Anti-expansionism; Classical liberalism Conservatism; Jeffersonianism; Republicanism
- Political position: Center-right
- National affiliation: Democratic-Republican Party

The tertium quids (usually shortened to quids) were various factions of the Democratic-Republican Party in the United States during the early 19th century, which gradually faded into political obscurity by the 1820s. Most were active in Pennsylvania or New York.

In Latin, tertium quid means "a third something". Initially, quid was a disparaging term that referred to cross-party coalitions of Federalists and moderate Republicans, such as those who supported the election of Thomas McKean as governor of Pennsylvania in 1805. However, by the 1810s, the term would more famously be used to refer to the radical faction of the Democratic-Republican Party. The group, which was also called the Old Republicans, was more strongly opposed to the Federalist Party's policies than was the emerging moderate leadership of the Democratic-Republican Party.

== Pennsylvania ==
Between 1801 and 1806, rival factions of Jeffersonian Republicans in Philadelphia, Pennsylvania, engaged in intense public debate and vigorous political competition, which pitted radical Democrats against moderate ones, who defended the traditional rights of the propertied classes. The radicals, led by William Duane, the publisher of the Jeffersonian Aurora, agitated for legislative reforms that would increase popular representation and the power of the poor and the laboring classes. The moderates successfully outmaneuvered their opponents and kept the Pennsylvania legislature friendly to the emerging liberal capitalism.

The term "tertium quids" was first used in 1804 to refer to the moderates, especially a faction of the Republican Party that called itself the Society of Constitutional Republicans. The faction gathered Federalist support and in 1805 re-elected Governor Thomas McKean, who had been elected by a united Republican Party in 1802 but had broken with the party's majority wing.

== New York State ==
In New York State, the term was applied to the faction of the Republican Party that remained loyal to Governor Morgan Lewis after he had been repudiated by the party's majority, which was led by DeWitt Clinton.

The New York State and the Pennsylvania Quid factions had no connection with each other at the federal level, and both of them supported US President Thomas Jefferson.

== Virginia ==
Virginia Representative John Randolph was the leader of the Quid faction of the Democratic-Republican Party.

When Virginia Representative John Randolph of Roanoke broke with Jefferson and James Madison in 1806, his faction was called the "Quids". Randolph was the leader of the Old Republican faction, which insisted on strict adherence to the US Constitution. He summarized Old Republican principles as "love of peace, hatred of offensive war, jealousy of the state governments toward the general government; a dread of standing armies; a loathing of public debts, taxes, and excises; tenderness for the liberty of the citizen; jealousy, Argus-eyed jealousy of the patronage of the President"

Randolph made no effort to align with either Quid faction in the states and made no effort to build a third party at the federal level. He supported James Monroe against Madison during the runup to the presidential election of 1808. However, the state Quids supported Madison and were led by Randolph, who had started as Jefferson's leader in the House but later became his most bitter enemy. Randolph denounced the compromise on the Yazoo Purchase in 1804 as totally corrupt. After Randolph failed to impeach a Supreme Court justice in 1805, he became embittered with Jefferson and Madison and complained: "Everything and everybody seem to be jumbled out of place, except a few men who are steeped in supine indifference, whilst meddling fools and designing knaves are governing the country." He refused to help fund Jefferson's secret purchase of Florida from Spain.

Increasingly, Randolph felt that Jefferson was adopting Federalist policies and betraying the true party spirit. In 1806, he wrote to an ally that "the Administration... favors federal principles, and, with the exception of a few great rival characters, federal men.... The old Republican party is already ruined, past redemption. New men and new maxims are the order of the day."

Randolph's increasingly-strident rhetoric limited his influence, and he was never able to build a coalition to stop Jefferson. However, many of his supporters lived on and, by 1824, had looked to Andrew Jackson to resurrect what they called "Old Republicanism".

== See also ==
- Agrarianism
- American gentry
- Anti-Federalism
- Classical liberalism
- Classical republicanism
- Democratic-Republican Party
- First Party System
- Jacksonian democracy
- Jeffersonian democracy
