= 1869 Pennsylvania gubernatorial election =

- October 12, 1869
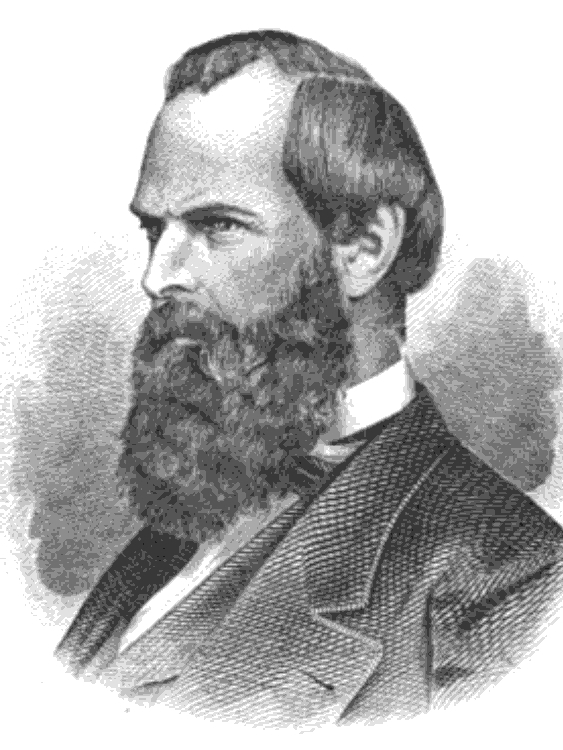

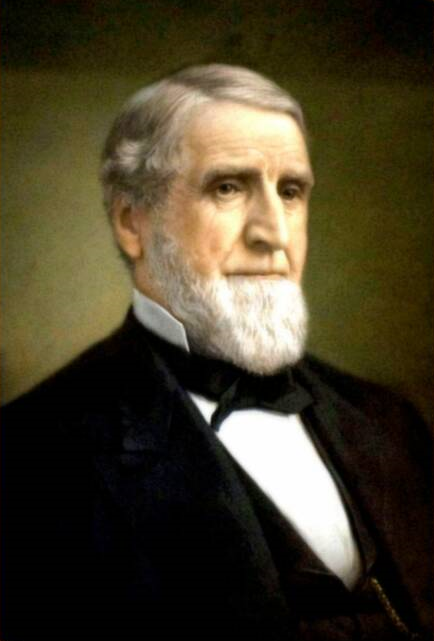
Nominee	John W. Geary	Asa Packer
Party	Republican	Democratic
Popular vote	290,552	285,956
Percentage	50.40%	49.60%
- County results Geary: 50–60% 60–70% 70–80% Packer: 50–60% 60–70% 70–80% 80–90%
Governor before election
John W. Geary
Republican
Elected Governor
John W. Geary
Republican

The 1869 Pennsylvania gubernatorial election occurred on October 12, 1869. Incumbent governor John W. Geary, a Republican, was a candidate for re-election. Geary defeated Democratic candidate Asa Packer to win another term.

== Results ==
Pennsylvania gubernatorial election, 1869
Party	Candidate	Votes	%
Republican	John W. Geary (incumbent)	290,552	50.40
Democratic	Asa Packer	285,956	49.60
Total votes		576,508	100.00
