= 1796 Pennsylvania gubernatorial election =

- October 11, 1796
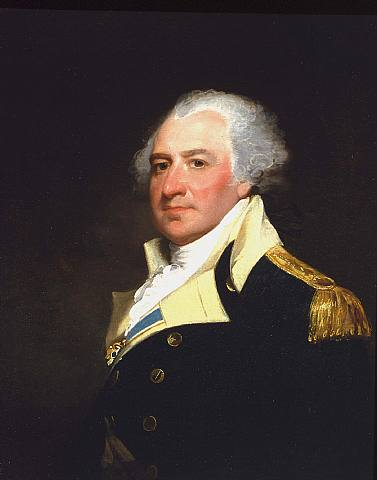

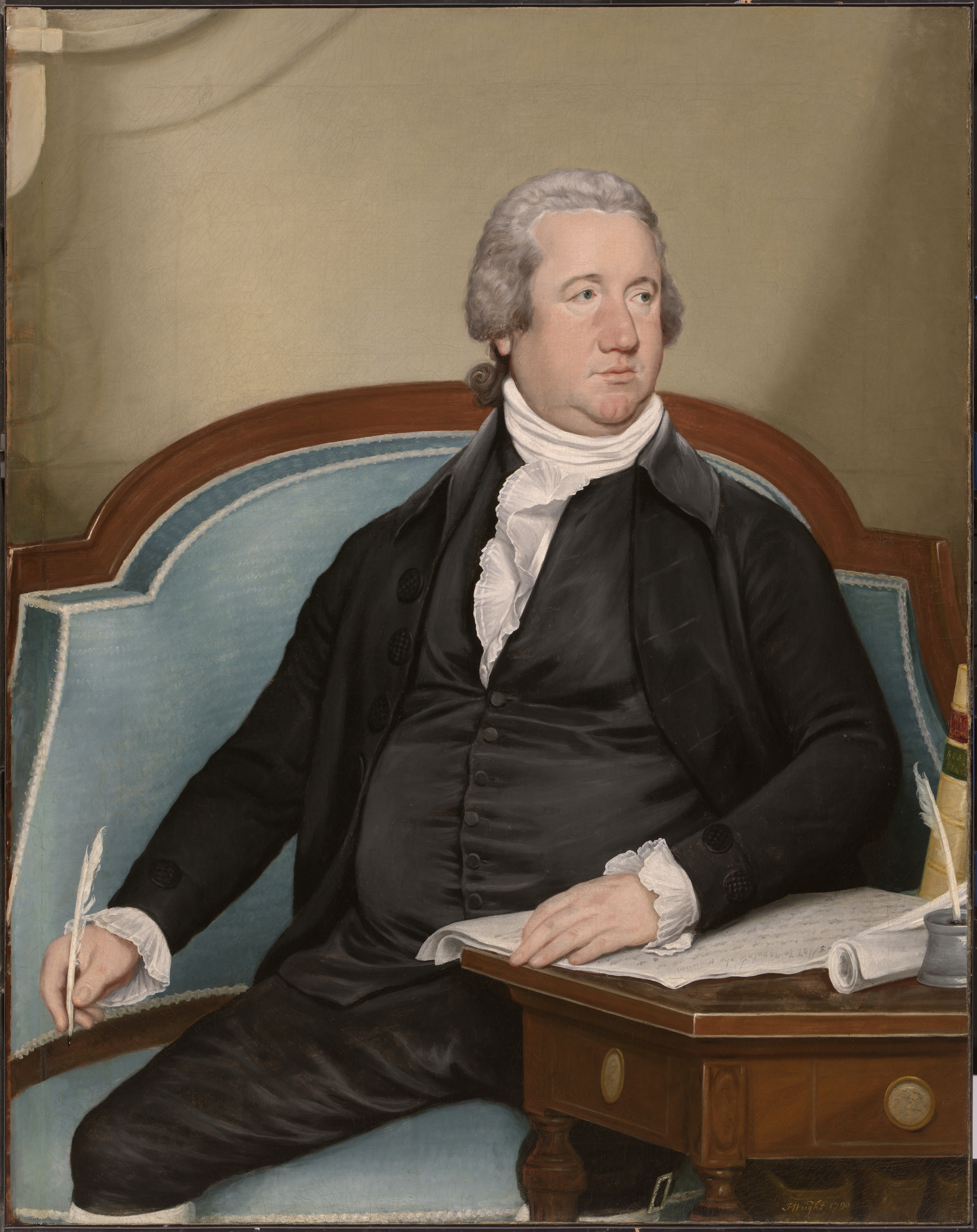
Nominee	Thomas Mifflin	Frederick Muhlenberg
Party	Democratic-Republican	Federalist
Popular vote	30,020	1,011
Percentage	96.31%	3.24%
- County Results; Mifflin: 70–80% 80–90% 90–100%
Governor before election
Thomas Mifflin
Democratic-Republican
Elected Governor
Thomas Mifflin
Democratic-Republican

The 1796 Pennsylvania gubernatorial election occurred on October 11, 1796. Incumbent Democratic-Republican governor Thomas Mifflin successfully sought re-election to a third term. For the second consecutive election, he was victorious over U.S. Representative Frederick Muhlenberg, the Federalist candidate, by a wide margin.

== Results ==
Pennsylvania gubernatorial election, 1796
Party	Candidate	Votes	%
Democratic-Republican	Thomas Mifflin (incumbent)	30,020	96.31
Federalist	Frederick Muhlenberg	1,011	3.24
Federalist	Anthony Wayne	139	0.45
Total votes		31,170	100.00
