= 1814 Pennsylvania gubernatorial election =

- October 11, 1814
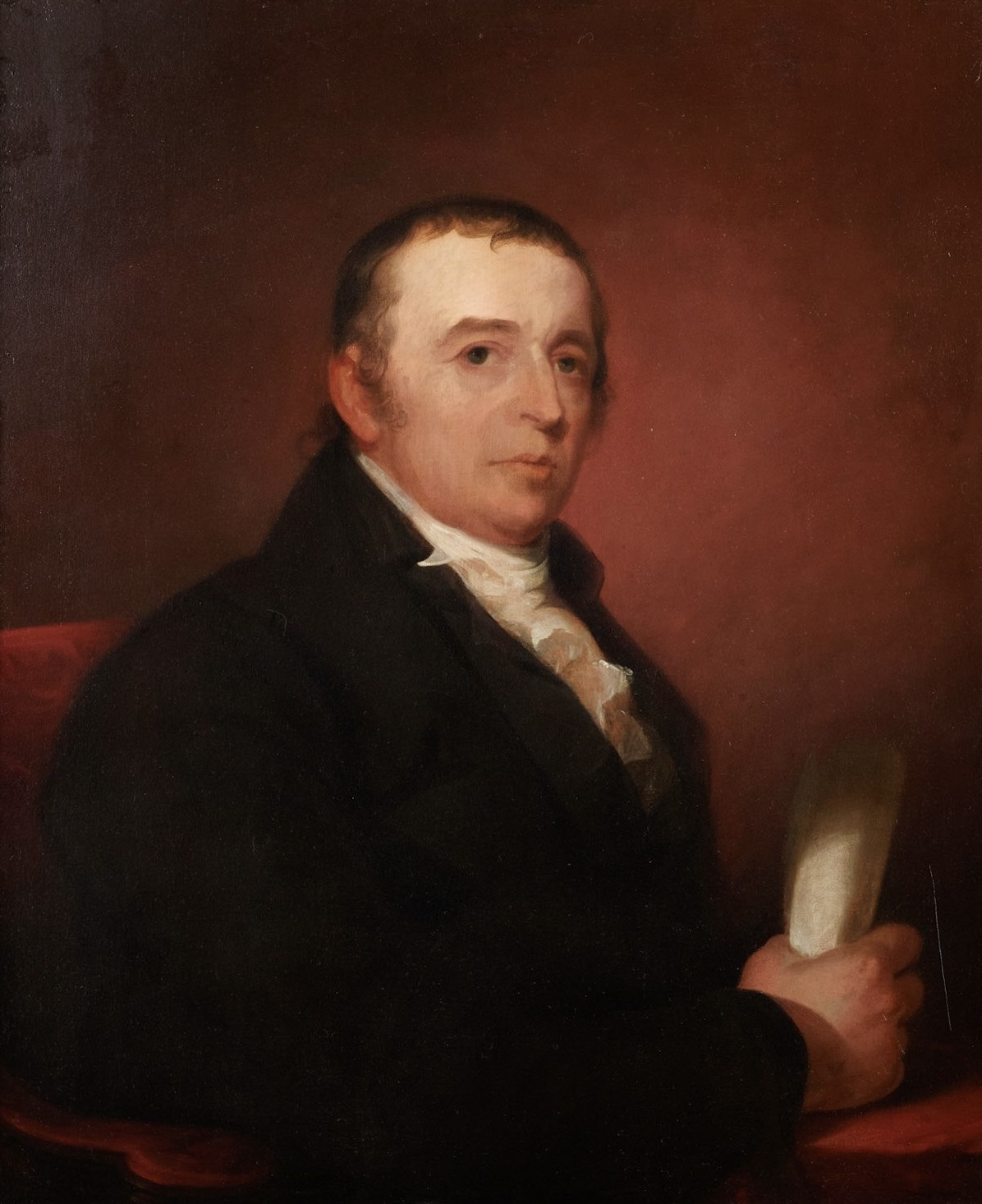
Nominee	Simon Snyder	Isaac Wayne
Party	Democratic-Republican	Federalist
Popular vote	51,099	29,566
Percentage	62.63%	36.24%
- County Results; Snyder: 50–60% 60–70% 70–80% 80–90% 90–100% Wayne: 50–60% 60–70% 70–80%
Governor before election
Simon Snyder
Democratic-Republican
Elected Governor
Simon Snyder
Democratic-Republican

The 1814 Pennsylvania gubernatorial election occurred on October 11, 1814. After contemplating retirement, incumbent Democratic-Republican governor Simon Snyder instead chose to run for reelection. He earned a third term as the state's executive after defeating Federalist candidate Isaac Wayne, a former member of the Pennsylvania State Senate.

== Results ==
Pennsylvania gubernatorial election, 1814
Party	Candidate	Votes	%
Democratic-Republican	Simon Snyder (incumbent)	51,099	62.63
Federalist	Isaac Wayne	29,566	36.24
Federalist	George Latimer*	910	1.12
N/A	Others	18	0.02
Total votes		81,593	100.00

*Note: Although Latimer ran as a Federalist, Wayne was the only Federalist to carry any counties, as shown on the map.
