= 1811 Pennsylvania gubernatorial election =

- October 8, 1811
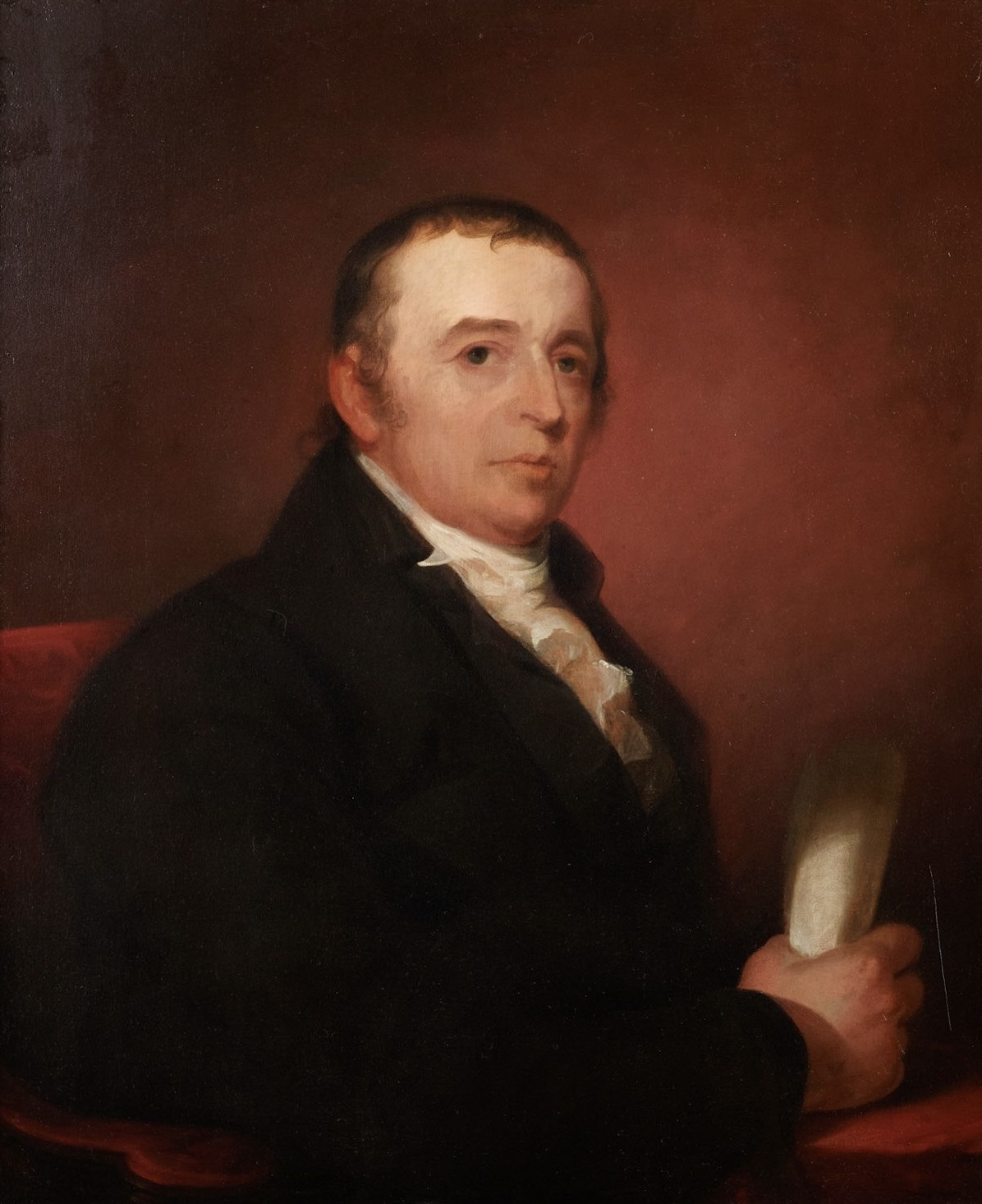

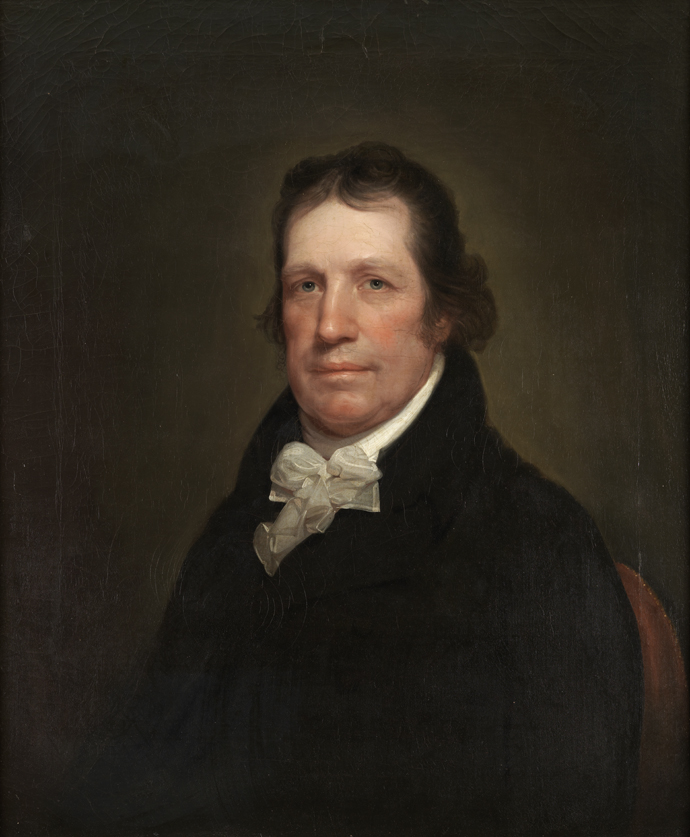
| Nominee | Simon Snyder | William Tilghman |
| Party | Democratic-Republican | Federalist |
| Popular vote | 52,319 | 3,609 |
| Percentage | 90.83% | 6.27% |
- County Results; Snyder: 50–60% 60–70% 70–80% 80–90% 90–100% No Data/Vote
Governor before election
Simon Snyder
Democratic-Republican
Elected Governor
Simon Snyder
Democratic-Republican

The 1811 Pennsylvania gubernatorial election occurred on October 8, 1811. Incumbent Democratic-Republican governor Simon Snyder won re-election over Federalist candidate William Tilghman, the Chief Justice of the Pennsylvania Supreme Court, by a wide margin. Two of the major policy goals on which Snyder campaigned were increasing spending for infrastructural upgrades and authorizing the transfer of governmental operations from Lancaster to Harrisburg.

== Results ==
Pennsylvania gubernatorial election, 1811
| Party | Candidate | Votes | % |
|---|---|---|---|
| Democratic-Republican | Simon Snyder (incumbent) | 52,319 | 90.83 |
| Federalist | William Tilghman | 3,609 | 6.27 |
| N/A | Others | 1,675 | 2.91 |
| Total votes | | 57,603 | 100.00 |
