= 1805 Pennsylvania gubernatorial election =

- October 8, 1805
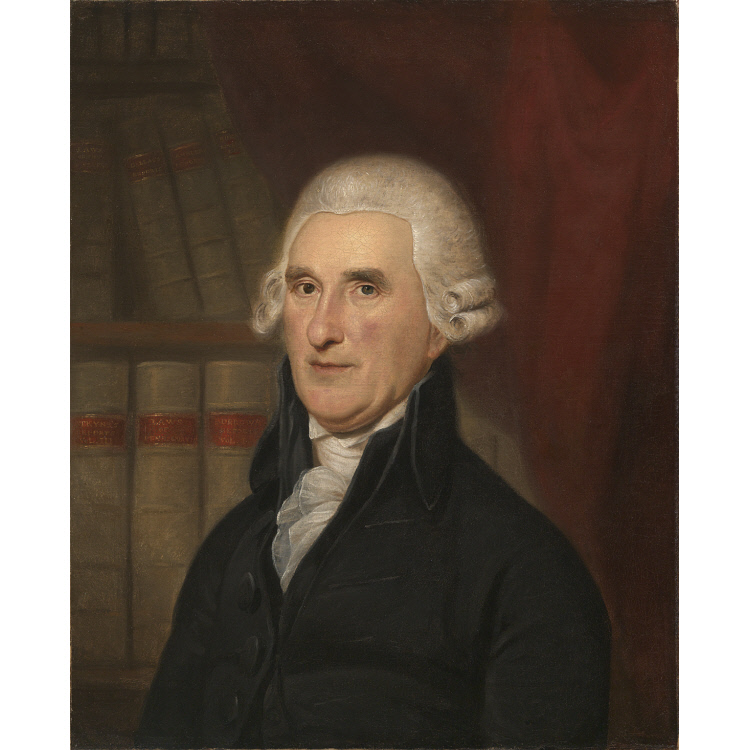

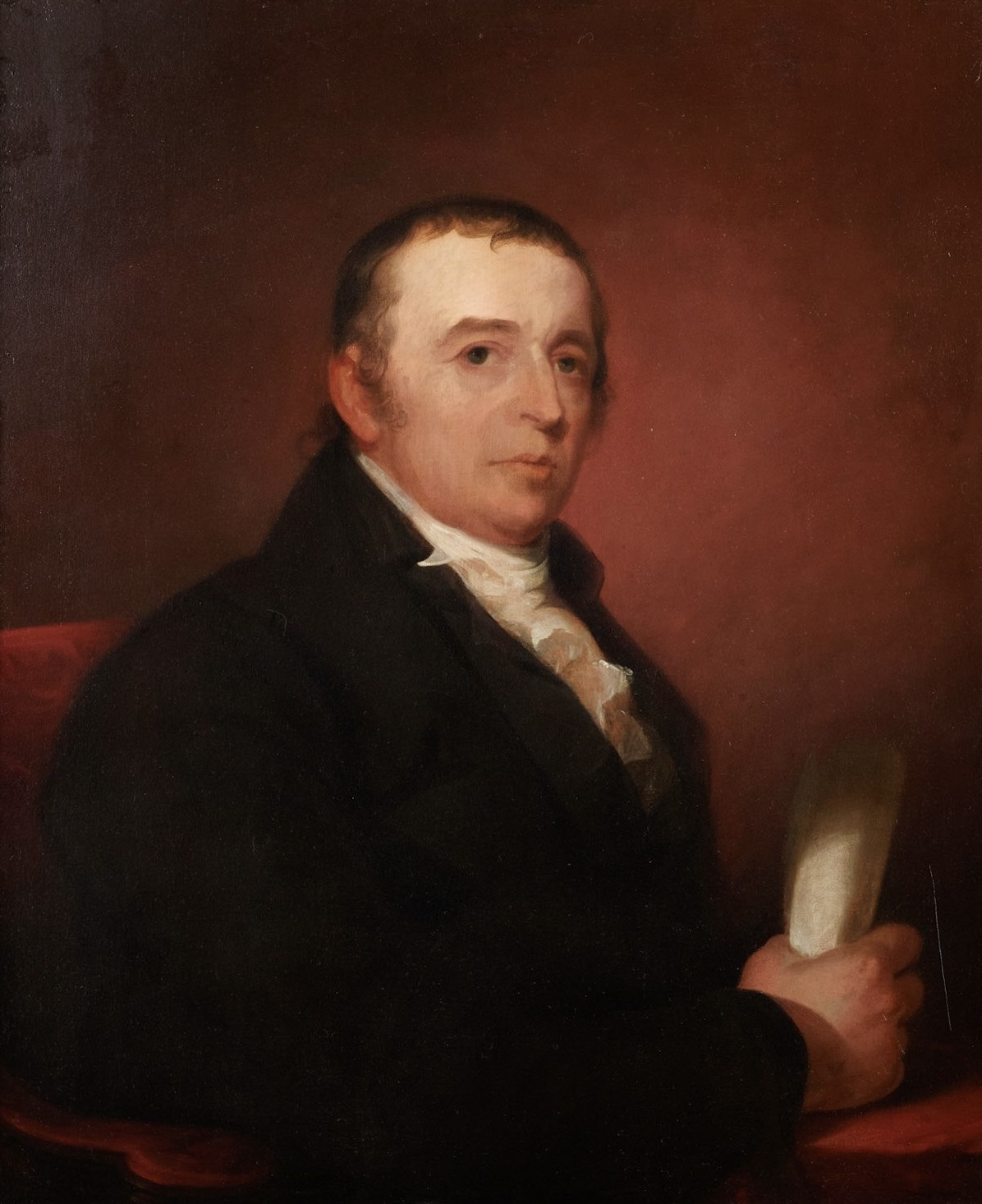
| Nominee | Thomas McKean | Simon Snyder |
| Party | Constitutionalist | Democratic-Republican |
| Alliance | Federalist |
| Popular vote | 43,674 | 38,529 |
| Percentage | 53.02% | 46.78% |
- County Results; McKean: 50–60% 60–70% 70–80% 80–90% Snyder: 50–60% 60–70% 70–80% 80–90% Unknown/No Vote
Governor before election
Thomas McKean
Constitutionalist
Elected Governor
Thomas McKean
Constitutionalist

The 1805 Pennsylvania gubernatorial election occurred on October 8, 1805. Incumbent governor Thomas McKean won a contentious election over the endorsed Democratic-Republican candidate, Speaker of the Pennsylvania House of Representatives Simon Snyder.

Although the Democratic-Republicans united behind the McKean ticket in each of the prior two election cycles, by 1805, the party had divided into moderate and radical wings. The former sought to balance the political power of the traditional elite and the lower classes; this group additionally supported liberal economic policies. The latter sought to directly increase political and economic opportunities for poor and working men. After the radicals took control of the state legislature under Snyder, they clashed with the moderate aligned McKean. Democratic-Republican newspapers were dominated by radical interests, and the press vociferously denounced McKean's support for strong executive and judicial power. The governor formed a working alliance with the Federalists called "the quids" and began to purge radicals from appointed offices. McKean ultimately won reelection by a six-point margin.

== Results ==
Pennsylvania gubernatorial election, 1805
| Party | Candidate | Votes | % |
|---|---|---|---|
| Quids | Thomas McKean (incumbent) | 43,674 | 53.02 |
| Democratic-Republican | Simon Snyder | 38,529 | 46.78 |
| None | James Ross | 17 | 0.02 |
| None | Robert Rhea | 8 | 0.01 |
| None | Benjamin Perry | 7 | 0.01 |
| None | Conrade Snyder | 7 | 0.01 |
| None | William Crawford | 6 | 0.01 |
| None | John Spear | 6 | 0.01 |
| None | Benjamin Beaty | 4 | 0.00 |
| None | John MacGinley | 4 | 0.00 |
| None | Simon MacKean | 2 | 0.00 |
| None | Gideon Ousterhout | 2 | 0.00 |
| None | Hugh Patterson | 2 | 0.00 |
| None | Jacob Rider | 2 | 0.00 |
| None | Jacob Sherman | 2 | 0.00 |
| None | Samuel Smith | 2 | 0.00 |
| None | John P. Arndt | 1 | 0.00 |
| None | Jacob Bower | 1 | 0.00 |
| None | Thomas Carothers | 1 | 0.00 |
| None | Robert Coleman | 1 | 0.00 |
| None | Joseph Debinder | 1 | 0.00 |
| None | William Duane | 1 | 0.00 |
| None | Hugh A. Dwyer | 1 | 0.00 |
| None | John Franklin | 1 | 0.00 |
| None | William Gilliland | 1 | 0.00 |
| None | Joseph Gray | 1 | 0.00 |
| None | Richard Gregory | 1 | 0.00 |
| None | Jonathan Hood | 1 | 0.00 |
| None | Thomas Jones | 1 | 0.00 |
| None | John Loughead | 1 | 0.00 |
| None | Moses MacClean | 1 | 0.00 |
| None | John MacGinnis | 1 | 0.00 |
| None | Thomas Meredith | 1 | 0.00 |
| None | Peter Muhlenberg | 1 | 0.00 |
| None | Thomas Paine | 1 | 0.00 |
| None | Anthony Sheetz | 1 | 0.00 |
| None | Edward Shippen | 1 | 0.00 |
| None | Anthony Swifford | 1 | 0.00 |
| None | William Walker | 1 | 0.00 |
| None | David Watts | 1 | 0.00 |
| None | Thomas Woriman | 1 | 0.00 |
| None | William Woriman | 1 | 0.00 |
| None | Blank or fictitious names | 68 | 0.08 |
| Total votes | | 82,368 | 100.00 |
