= 1793 Pennsylvania gubernatorial election =

- October 8, 1793
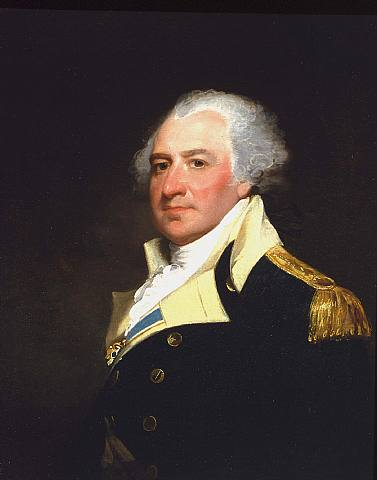

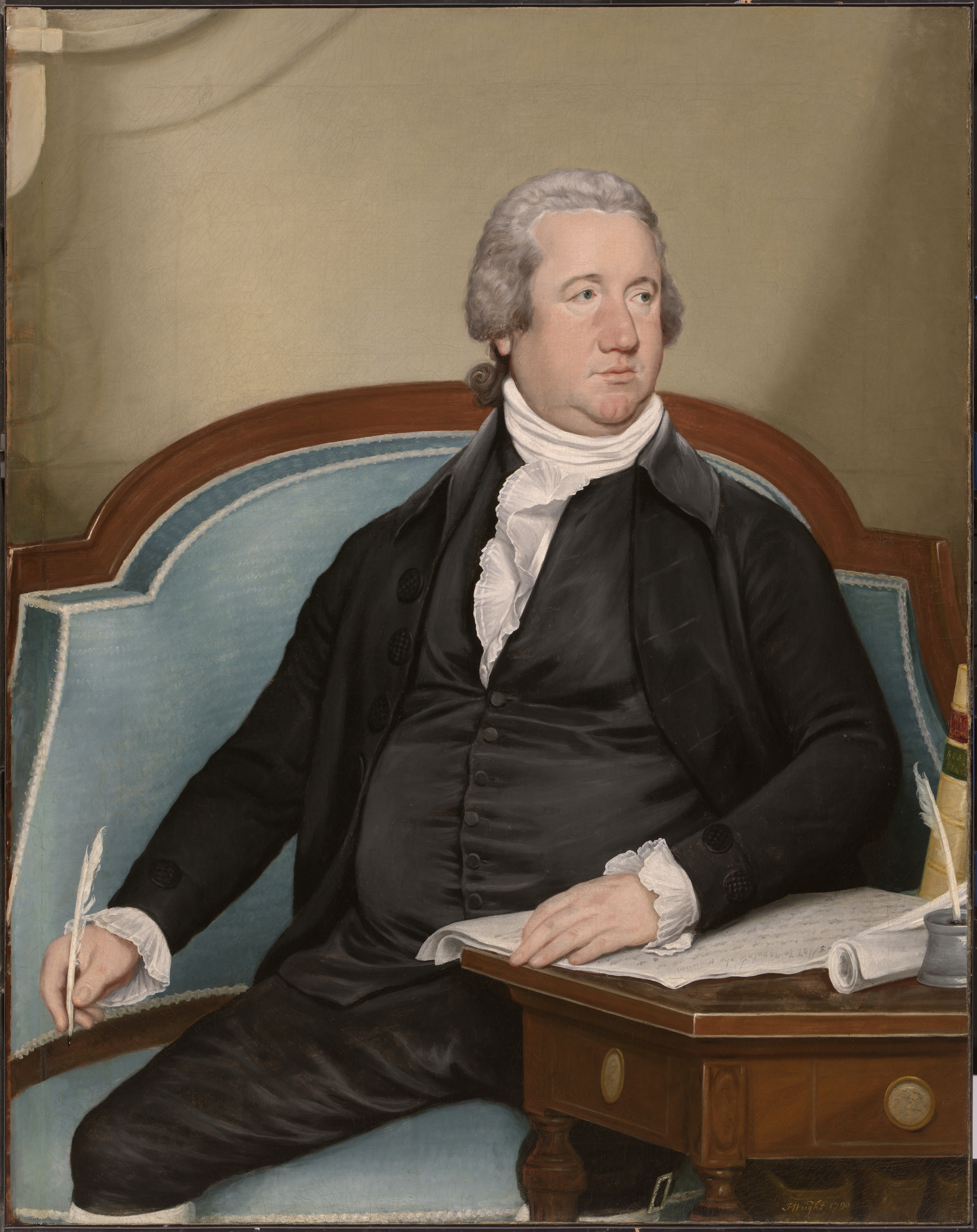
Candidate	Thomas Mifflin	Frederick Muhlenberg
Party	Democratic-Republican	Federalist
Popular vote	20,479	10,803
Percentage	65.43%	34.51%
- County Results; Mifflin: 50–60% 60–70% 70–80% 80–90% 90–100% Muhlenberg: 50–60% 60–70%
Governor before election
Thomas Mifflin
Democratic-Republican
Elected Governor
Thomas Mifflin
Democratic-Republican

The 1793 Pennsylvania gubernatorial election occurred on October 8, 1793. Incumbent Democratic-Republican governor Thomas Mifflin sought re-election to another term, defeating Federalist candidate and U.S. Representative Frederick Muhlenberg. Muhlenberg won only two counties: York and Bedford. However, Mifflin's 2–1 vote margin was down from his 10–1 victory margin in the 1790 gubernatorial election.

== Results ==
Pennsylvania gubernatorial election, 1793
Party	Candidate	Votes	%
Democratic-Republican	Thomas Mifflin (incumbent)	20,479	65.43
Federalist	Frederick Muhlenberg	10,803	34.51
Independent	Alexander McDowell	8	0.03
N/A	Others	11	0.04
Total votes		31,301	100.00
