= 1808 Pennsylvania gubernatorial election =

- October 11, 1808
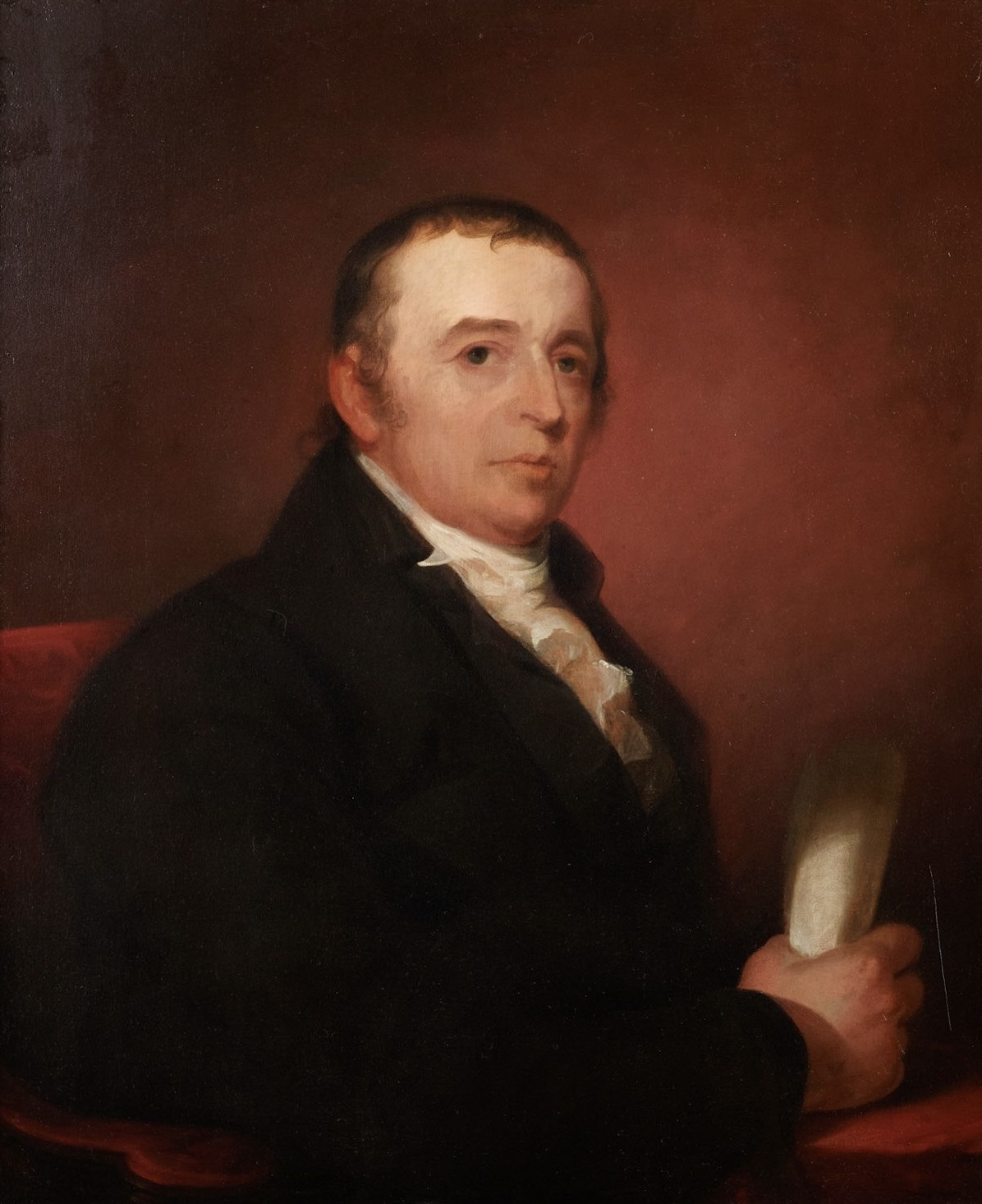

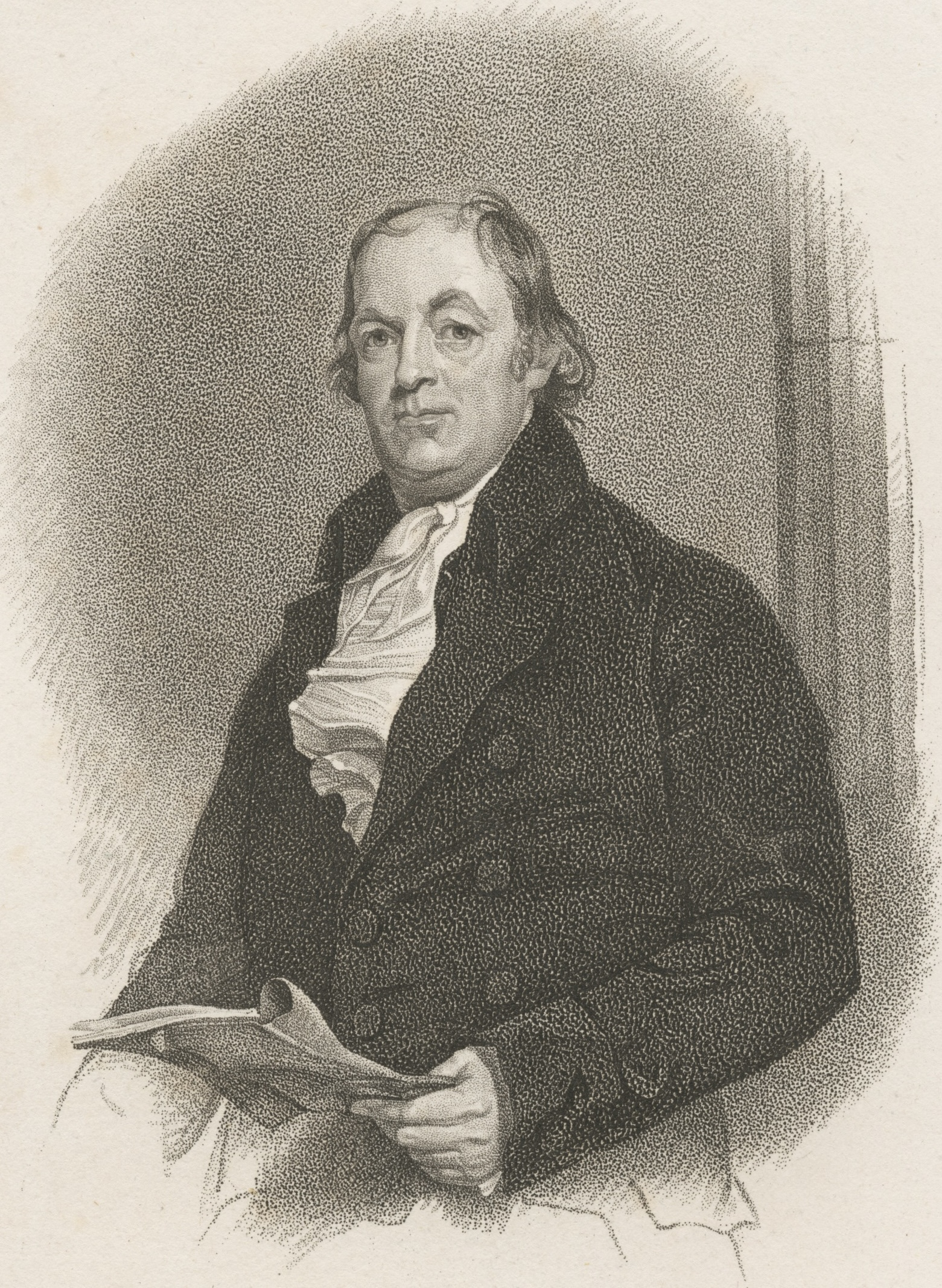
Nominee	Simon Snyder	James Ross
Party	Democratic-Republican	Federalist
Popular vote	67,975	39,575
Percentage	60.93%	35.47%
- County Results; Snyder: 50–60% 60–70% 70–80% 80–90% Ross: 40–50% 50–60% 60–70%
Governor before election
Thomas McKean
Independent
Elected Governor
Simon Snyder
Democratic-Republican

The 1808 Pennsylvania gubernatorial election occurred on October 11, 1808. Incumbent governor Thomas McKean, a former Democratic Republican who had faced impeachment by members of his own party during the prior term, was not a candidate. Democratic-Republican candidate Simon Snyder, former Speaker of the Pennsylvania House of Representatives defeated Federalist candidate and former U.S. Senator James Ross to become Governor of Pennsylvania. Snyder, with the aid of a supportive press, campaigned as a "New School Democrat" and attempted to ally himself with James Madison. He painted the former McKean administration as elitist and advocated for popular democracy, governmental intervention in the economy, and infrastructural support for Western Pennsylvania counties.

== Results ==
Pennsylvania gubernatorial election, 1808
Party	Candidate	Votes	%
Democratic-Republican	Simon Snyder	67,975	60.93
Federalist	James Ross	39,575	35.47
Federalist	John Spayd*	4,006	3.59
N/A	Others	8	0.01
Total votes		111,564	100.00

*Note: Although Spayd ran as a Federalist, Ross was the only Federalist to carry any counties, as shown on the map.
