= Simon Snyder =

3rd Governor of Pennsylvania

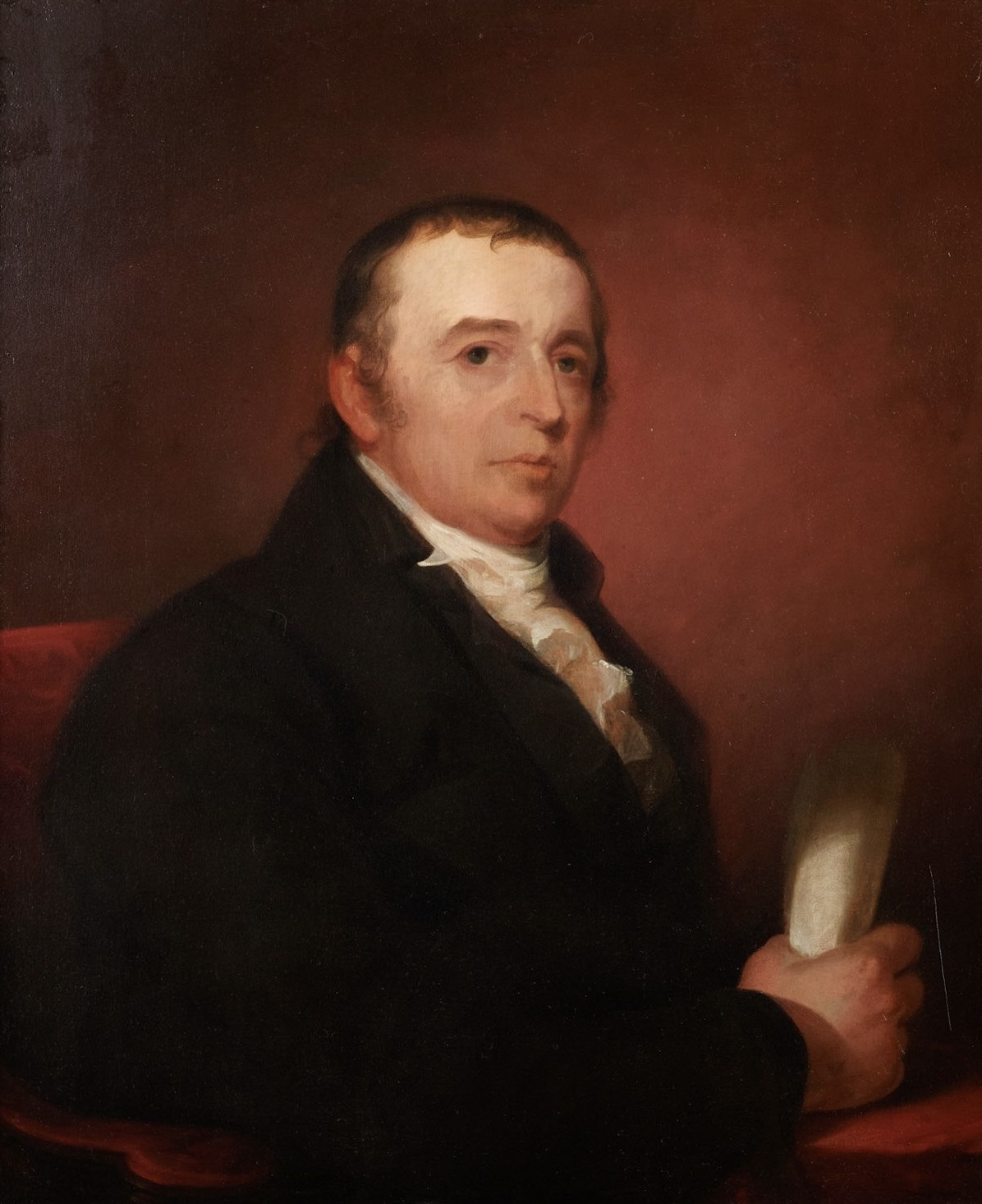
- Portarit by Thomas Sully, c. 1809

3rd Governor of Pennsylvania
- In office December 20, 1808 – December 16, 1817
- Preceded by: Thomas McKean
- Succeeded by: William Findlay

Personal details
- Born: November 5, 1759 Lancaster, Province of Pennsylvania, British America
- Died: November 9, 1819 (aged 60) Selinsgrove, Pennsylvania, U.S.
- Party: Democratic-Republican
- Spouses: Elizabeth Michael (m. 1790; died 1794) Catherine Antes (m. 1796; died 1810) Mary Slough Scott (m. 1814)
- Children: 7

Simon Snyder (November 5, 1759 – November 9, 1819) was the third governor of Pennsylvania, serving three terms from 1808 to 1817. He led the state through the War of 1812.

Born in Lancaster, Pennsylvania, Snyder established a gristmill in Selinsgrove, Pennsylvania. He was elected as a justice of the peace and served as a delegate to the 1790 Pennsylvania constitutional convention. He served in the Pennsylvania House of Representatives from 1797 to 1807, and won election as Speaker of the House. A member of the Democratic-Republican Party, he ran for governor in 1805 but was defeated by Thomas McKean.

He won election as governor in 1808 and won re-election in 1811 and 1814. He was the first governor elected in Pennsylvania who was of German descent, and was also the first governor of Pennsylvania to issue a Thanksgiving Proclamation.

Snyder presided over the establishment of Harrisburg as the state capital. He strongly supported the War of 1812 and was a candidate for the Democratic-Republican vice presidential nomination in the 1816 presidential election. Following the conclusion of his third term, he was elected to the Pennsylvania State Senate for the 9th Senatorial District but died of typhoid fever in 1819 before he began to serve.

== Early life ==
Snyder was born on November 5, 1759, in Lancaster in the Province of Pennsylvania. His parents were ethnic Germans. Anton Schneider and Agnesa Krämer (née Knippenberg) Schneider reared him in the Lutheran church. His father was a mechanic, and had immigrated to Pennsylvania in 1744 from Germany, part of a large wave of immigrants from there in the 18th century. The family was for many years associated with the Moravian Church in Lancaster, consistently listed in membership catalogs of the congregation during the 1760s and 1770s. After his father's death in 1774, when Snyder was 15, the youth became apprenticed to a tanner in York, Pennsylvania, in order to learn a trade. He used his limited leisure time for study.

In 1784, Snyder moved to Selinsgrove, Pennsylvania, where he opened a gristmill. He was elected as justice of the peace, serving for twelve years. His residence still stands at 121 North Market Street and is now known as the Gov. Simon Snyder Mansion; it is listed on the National Register of Historic Places.

== Marriage and family ==
In 1790, Snyder married Elizabeth Michael. They had two children. Elizabeth died in 1794 and her widowed husband was left to raise their young children.

Snyder quickly remarried, as was common in those days, to Catherine Antes on July 12, 1796. He and his second wife had another five children together. Catherine Antes Snyder died on March 15, 1810, in Selinsgrove and is buried at the First Reformed Church Memorial Garden in Lancaster, Pennsylvania.

In 1814, Snyder married Mary Slough Scott, a widow. They remained together until his death in 1819.

== Early political career ==
Snyder began his political career as a justice of the peace. In 1789 he was elected as a delegate to revise Pennsylvania's state constitution in 1790. Following this, he was elected to the Pennsylvania House of Representatives, serving from 1797 to 1807. During this time, he was elected three times as the speaker of the House: in 1804, in 1805, and in 1807.

While in the House, Snyder sought the governorship as a Jeffersonian Democrat in 1805, but he was defeated by the incumbent governor Thomas McKean, also a Jeffersonian Democrat. A lack of public recognition in comparison to the incumbent contributed to Snyder's losing the election.

Snyder sponsored the "Hundred-dollar Act," which embodied the arbitration principle. It provided for the trial of civil cases only when the amount in question was more than one hundred dollars.

== Governorship ==
In 1808, the Jeffersonians united behind Snyder, and he won the election for governor. Snyder ran again in the succeeding elections of 1811 and 1814, easily winning reelection against the Federalist candidates William Tilghman, Chief Justice of the Pennsylvania Supreme Court, and Isaac Wayne, respectively. In 1812, Snyder suggested relocating the capital city of the commonwealth from Lancaster to its present, more central location in Harrisburg. The General Assembly approved this proposal.

== War of 1812 ==
Snyder supported the War of 1812 wholeheartedly despite Federalist cries of dissent. With the United States emerging undefeated at the end of the war, this criticism subsided. After the war, John Binns supported elevating Snyder to consideration for the vice-presidential slot on President James Madison's ticket, but later the governor was disregarded as a possible candidate.

== Post governorship ==
Snyder was elected by the people of Union County, Pennsylvania, to the Pennsylvania State Senate in 1818. He died from typhoid fever in Selinsgrove on November 9, 1819, before taking office. He is buried at the Old Lutheran Cemetery in Selinsgrove.

== Legacy and honors ==
- His gravesite at Old Lutheran Cemetery of Sharon Lutheran Church in Selinsgrove is marked by a monument topped by his bust.
- His house at Selinsgrove, known as the Gov. Simon Snyder Mansion, was listed on the National Register of Historic Places in 1978. It is now a brewery.
- Sy Snyder is a pseudonym for the publishers of PoliticsPA, a website dedicated to Pennsylvania politics.
- Snyder County, Pennsylvania, is named in his honor.
- Snyder Avenue in South Philadelphia, is named in his honor.
- A residence hall at Penn State University is named in his honor.

== See also ==
- Speaker of the Pennsylvania House of Representatives

== Sources ==
- PHMC: Governors of Pennsylvania

Party political offices
Preceded by Thomas McKean	Democratic-Republican nominee for Governor of Pennsylvania; 1805, 1808, 1811, 1814	Succeeded by William Findlay
Political offices
Preceded by Thomas McKean	Governor of Pennsylvania; December 20, 1808 – December 16, 1817	Succeeded by William Findlay
