= Pennsylvania Democratic Party =

Pennsylvania affiliate of the Democratic Party

- Abbreviation: PADems
- Chairperson: Eugene DePasquale
- Governor of Pennsylvania: Josh Shapiro
- Lieutenant Governor of Pennsylvania: Austin Davis
- Senate Leader: Jay Costa
- House Speaker: Joanna McClinton
- House Leader: Matthew Bradford
- Founded: 1792
- Headquarters: 229 State Street Harrisburg, Pennsylvania 17101
- Student wing: Pennsylvania College Democrats of America; High School Democrats of Pennsylvania
- Youth wing: Pennsylvania Young Democrats
- Women's wing: Pennsylvania Federation of Democratic Women
- Membership (2026): ▲3,842,840
- National affiliation: Democratic Party
- Colors: Blue
- U.S. Senate seats: 1 / 2
- U.S. House seats: 7 / 17
- Statewide executive offices: 2 / 5
- Senate of Pennsylvania: 23 / 50
- Pennsylvania House of Representatives: 103 / 203
- Supreme Court of Pennsylvania: 4 / 7

Election symbol

Website
- www.padems.org

The Pennsylvania Democratic Party (PADems) is the Pennsylvania affiliate of the Democratic Party. Along with the Pennsylvania Republican Party, it is one of the two major political parties in the U.S. state of Pennsylvania. The party is headquartered in Harrisburg and is chaired by Eugene DePasquale.

The party currently holds the governorship and lieutenant governorship, one of Pennsylvania's two seats in the United States Senate, seven of its 17 seats in the United States House of Representatives, and a majority in the Pennsylvania House of Representatives. Democrats are in the minority in the Pennsylvania State Senate.

== Platform ==
The state Democratic Party has recently made economic factors a major component of its platform, with advocacy for middle class workers of particular prominence. The party has also opposed Republican-sponsored legislation to require a photo ID for voting, asserting that such a requirement would discourage minorities, youth, and those with low incomes from voting because they are less likely to possess a state-issued ID. Additionally, the party has committed itself to maintaining the social safety net and encouraging more transparency in state government.

Key issues for the party include affordable healthcare, jobs and wages, support for workers and unions, fairer taxes, strong public education, retirement security, civil rights, environmental protection, marijuana legalization, and criminal justice reform.

A priority for Pennsylvania Democrats in the 2010s and 2020s has been increasing the minimum wage.

== History ==
=== Early history ===
The Pennsylvania Democratic Party traces its history to 1792 claiming to be a continuation of the original Republican Party. Pennsylvania Democrat James Buchanan was elected president in 1856 but did not seek re-election four years later, when Abraham Lincoln, a Republican, was elected president. Buchanan's rise and fall from political prominence coincided with that of the Democratic Party in Pennsylvania; for much of the late nineteenth and early twentieth century, the party was largely out of power.

=== Recent history ===
The party held the governorship from 2003 to 2011 with the election of Ed Rendell in 2002 and his re-election in 2006. The party lost control of the governorship following the election of Republican Tom Corbett in 2010. The party picked up a U.S. Senate seat in 2006 with the election of Bob Casey Jr. Pennsylvania Democrats also briefly held both of the state's U.S. Senate seats following Arlen Specter's party-switch. However, Joe Sestak defeated Specter in the May 2010 Democratic primary before losing the fall general election to Republican Pat Toomey. On the state legislative level, the party won a majority in the Pennsylvania House of Representatives in 2006 and in 2008 but lost its majority in the 2010 election.

Republican governor Tom Corbett was defeated for re-election to a second term by Democrat Tom Wolf. This marked the first time an incumbent governor lost re-election in Pennsylvania. Wolf was re-elected in 2018.

== Current officeholders ==
The party controls two of five statewide executive offices, including the governorship, and is in the minority in the Pennsylvania State Senate. Democrats hold one of the state's U.S. Senate seats, seven of the state's 17 U.S. House seats, and the Pennsylvania House of Representatives.

=== Federal ===
==== U.S. Senate ====
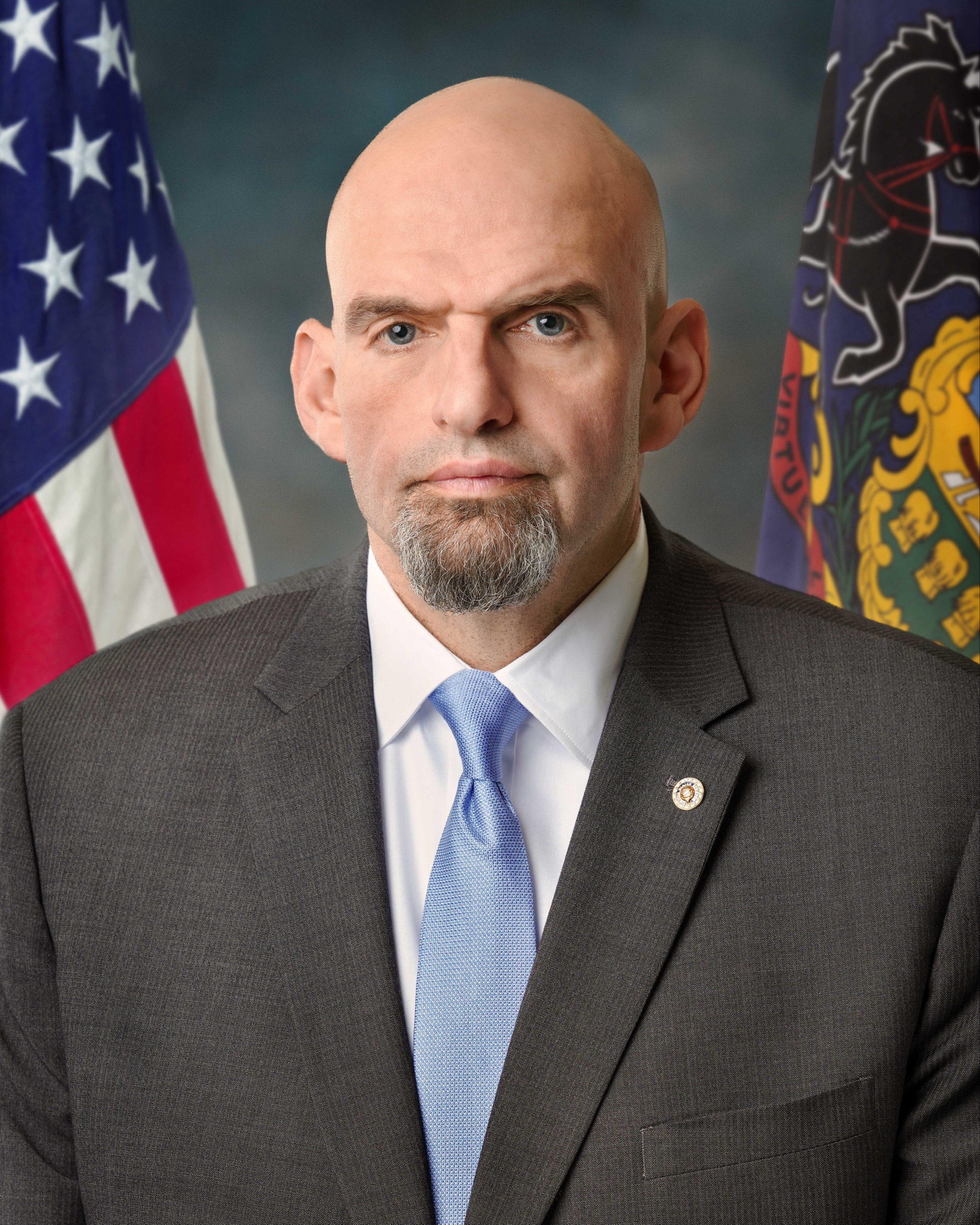
Senior U.S. Senator John Fetterman

==== U.S. House of Representatives ====
District	Member	Photo
1st	Bob Harvie (elect)	
2nd	Brendan Boyle	
3rd	Dwight Evans	
3rd	Chris Rabb (elect)	
4th	Madeleine Dean	
5th	Mary Gay Scanlon	
6th	Chrissy Houlahan	
7th	Bob Brooks (elect)	
8th	Paige Cognetti (elect)	
10th	Janelle Stelson (elect)	
12th	Summer Lee	
17th	Chris Deluzio	

=== State ===
==== Executive ====
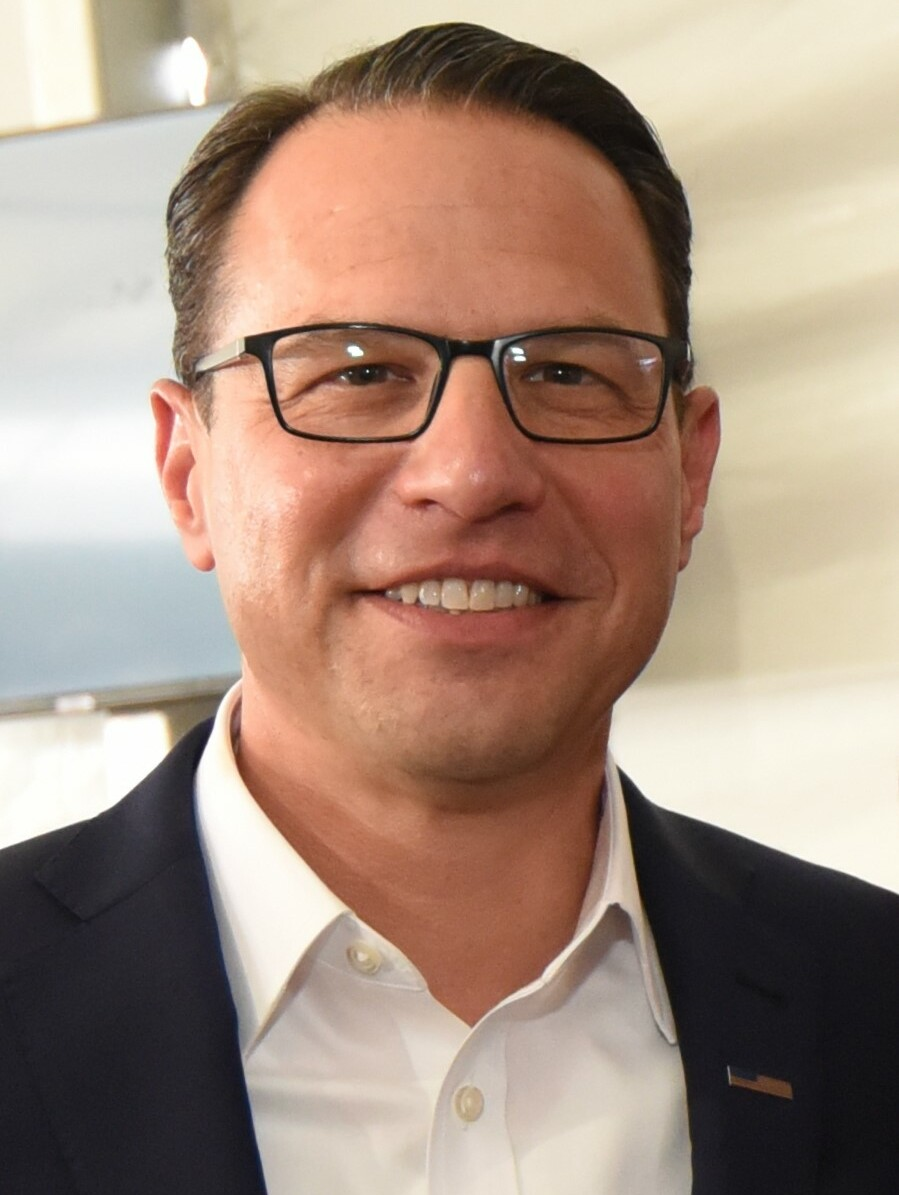
Governor Josh Shapiro

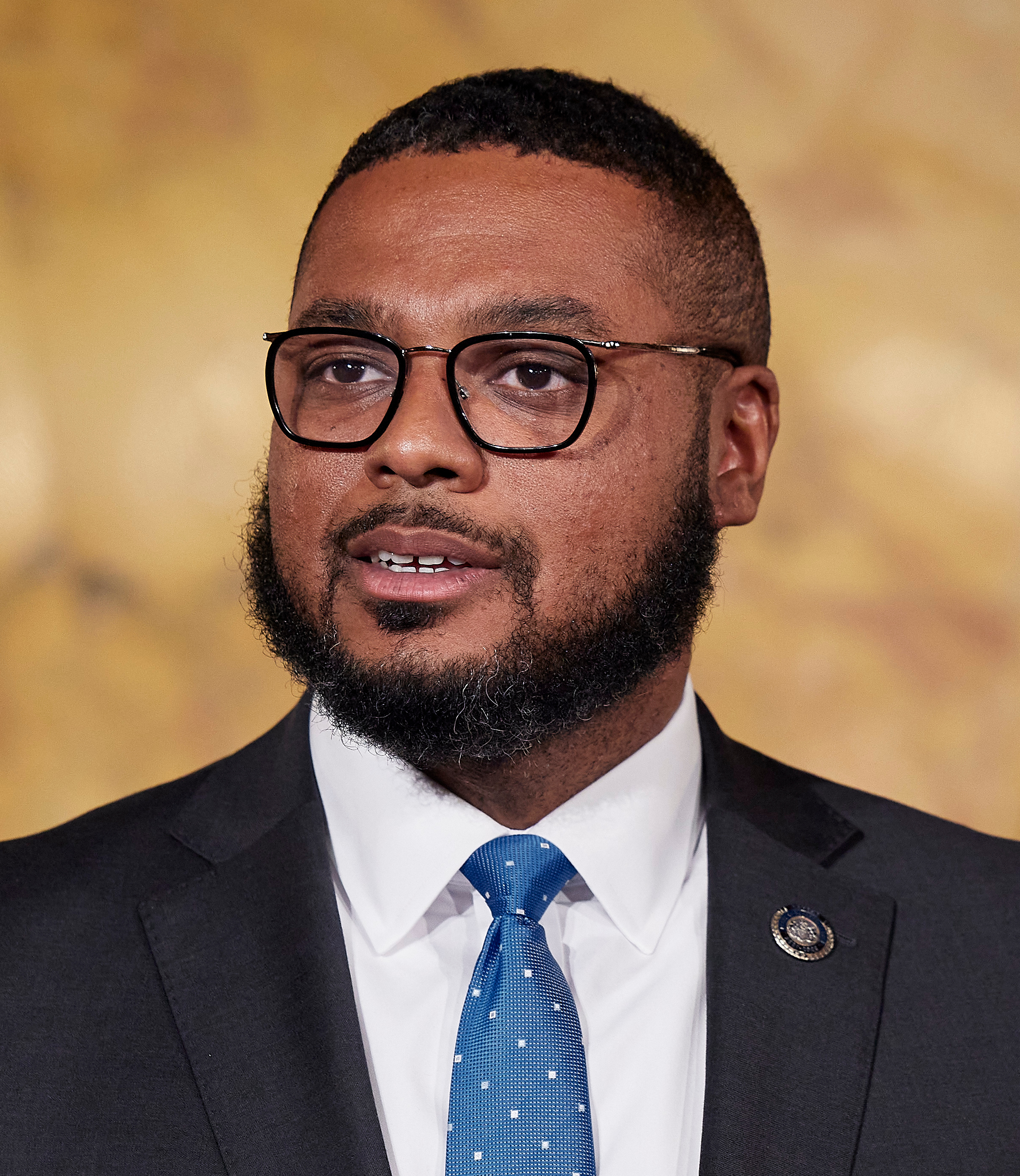
Lieutenant Governor Austin Davis

==== Legislature ====
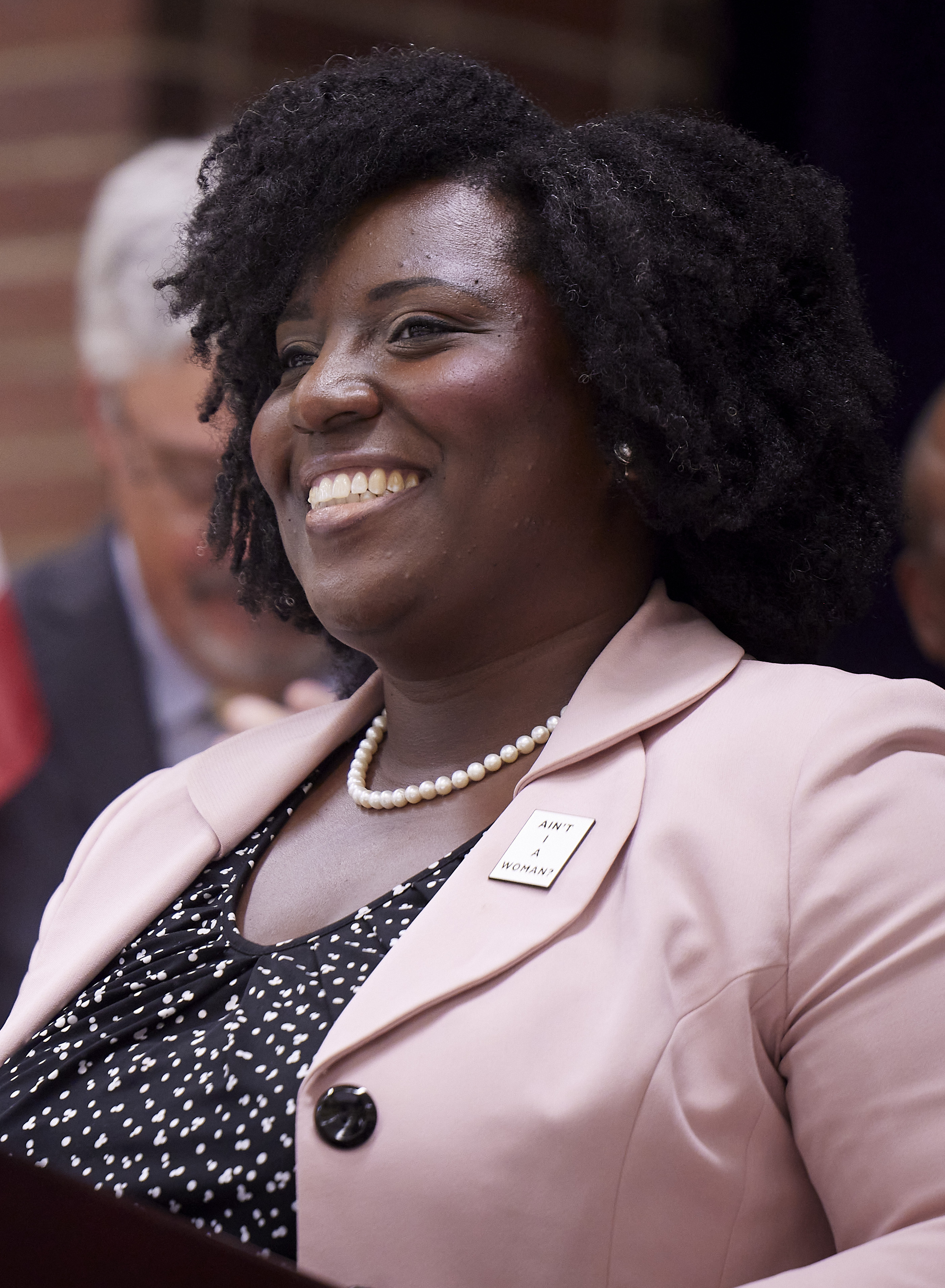
Speaker of the Pennsylvania House of Representatives Joanna McClinton

===== Floor leaders =====
As of 19 November 2024:

Senate	Leadership Position	House
Jay Costa	Floor Leader	Matthew Bradford
Christine Tartaglione	Whip	Mike Schlossberg
Maria Collett	Caucus Chairperson	Robert Matzie
Steve Santarsiero	Caucus Secretary	Tina Davis
Vincent Hughes	Appropriations Committee Chairman	Jordan Harris
Judy Schwank	Caucus Administrator	Leanne Krueger
Nick Miller	Policy Committee Chairman	Ryan Bizzarro

==== Mayors ====
- Philadelphia: Cherelle Parker (1)
- Pittsburgh: Corey O'Connor (2)
- Allentown: Matthew Tuerk (3)
- Reading: Eddie Moran (4)
- Erie: Daria Devlin (5)
- Scranton: Paige Cognetti (7)
- Bethlehem: J. William Reynolds (8)
- Lancaster: Danene Sorace (11)
- Harrisburg: Wanda Williams (15)

== Leadership ==
- Chair: Eugene DePasquale
- Vice-Chair: Jamila Winder
- Treasurer: Amanda Hammock

=== Former chairs ===
- Lawrence H. Rupp (1918–1920)
- John R. Collins (1928–1932)
- Warren Van Dyke (1932–1934)
- David L. Lawrence (1934–1940, 1942–1945)
- Meredith Meyers (1940–1942)
- Warren Mickle (1945–1948)
- Philip Mathews (1948–1949)
- Maurice Splain Jr. (1949–1954)
- Joseph M. Barr (1954–1959)
- John S. Rice (1959–1961, 1965–1966)
- Otis B. Morse (1961–1965)
- Thomas Z. Minehart (1966–1970)
- John N. Scales (1970–1972)
- Dennis "Harvey" Thiemann (1972–1979)
- Alex Debreczeni (1979–1981)
- Edward Mezvinsky (1981–1986)
- Harris Wofford (1986)
- Larry Yatch (1986–1991)
- J. William Lincoln (1991–1994)
- Linda Rhodes (1994–1995)
- Mark Singel (1995–1997)
- Christine Tartaglione (1998–2002)
- Allen Kukovich (2002–2003)
- T. J. Rooney (2003–2010)
- Jim Burn (2010–2015)
- Marcel Groen (2015–2018)
- Nancy Patton Mills (2018–2022)
- Sharif Street (2022–2025)

== Election results ==
=== Federal ===
==== U.S. House ====
Election	Votes	%	Seats (PA)	±	%
2016	2,625,157	45.70	5 / 18	0	1.24
2018	2,712,665	55.03	9 / 18	▲3	9.33
2020	3,346,712	49.37	9 / 18	0	5.66
2022	2,436,919	47.30	9 / 17	0	2.07
2024	3,338,371	48.95	7 / 17	▼2	1.65
2026	2,827,708	56.73	11 / 17	▲4	7.68

=== State ===
==== Executive offices ====
Governor
Election	Candidate	Votes	%	Result
1826	John Andrew Shulze	72,710	96.87%	Won ✓
1829	George Wolf	78,219	60.17%	Won ✓
1832	George Wolf	91,335	50.88%	Won ✓
1835	Henry A. P. Muhlenberg	40,586	20.25%	Lost ✗
1838	David R. Porter	127,821	51.10%	Won ✓
1841	David R. Porter	136,504	54.44%	Won ✓
1844	Francis R. Shunk	160,322	50.27%	Won ✓
1847	Francis R. Shunk	146,081	50.84%	Won ✓
1848	Morris Longstreth	168,225	49.95%	Lost ✗
1851	William Bigler	186,489	50.89%	Won ✓
1854	William Bigler	166,991	44.77%	Lost ✗
1857	William F. Packer	188,846	52.00%	Won ✓
1860	Henry Donnel Foster	230,230	46.74%	Lost ✗
1863	George Washington Woodward	254,171	48.54%	Lost ✗
1866	Hiester Clymer	290,096	48.56%	Lost ✗
1869	Asa Packer	285,956	49.60%	Lost ✗
1872	Charles R. Buckalew	317,700	47.26%	Lost ✗
1875	Cyrus L. Pershing	292,145	47.93%	Lost ✗
1878	Andrew H. Dill	297,060	42.31%	Lost ✗
1882	Robert E. Pattison	355,791	47.83%	Won ✓
1886	Chauncey Forward Black	369,634	45.12%	Lost ✗
1890	Robert E. Pattison	464,209	50.01%	Won ✓
1894	William M. Singerly	333,404	34.98%	Lost ✗
1898	George A. Jenks	358,300	36.87%	Lost ✗
1902	Robert E. Pattison	450,978	41.19%	Lost ✗
1906	Lewis Emery Jr.	458,054	45.51%	Lost ✗
1910	Isaac Webster Grim	129,395	12.96%	Lost ✗
1914	Vance McCormick	453,880	40.84%	Lost ✗
1918	Eugene C. Bonniwell	305,315	33.74%	Lost ✗
1922	John A. McSparran	581,625	39.71%	Lost ✗
1926	Eugene C. Bonniwell	365,280	24.29%	Lost ✗
1930	John M. Hemphill	1,010,204	47.98%	Lost ✗
1934	George Howard Earle III	1,476,377	50.04%	Won ✓
1938	Charles Alvin Jones	1,756,192	46.07%	Lost ✗
1942	F. Clair Ross	1,149,897	45.13%	Lost ✗
1946	John S. Rice/John Herman Dent	1,270,947	40.68%	Lost ✗
1950	Richardson Dilworth/Michael Musmanno	1,710,355	48.31%	Lost ✗
1954	George M. Leader/Roy Furman	1,996,266	53.66%	Won ✓
1958	David L. Lawrence/John Morgan Davis	2,024,852	58.85%	Won ✓
1962	Richardson Dilworth/Stephen McCann	1,938,627	44.28%	Lost ✗
1966	Milton Shapp/Leonard Staisey	1,868,719	46.13%	Lost ✗
1970	Milton Shapp/Ernest Kline	2,043,029	55.30%	Won ✓
1974	Milton Shapp/Ernest Kline	1,878,252	53.66%	Won ✓
1978	Peter F. Flaherty/Robert P. Casey	1,737,888	46.44%	Lost ✗
1982	Allen E. Ertel/James R. Lloyd	1,772,353	48.11%	Lost ✗
1986	Bob Casey Sr./Mark Singel	1,717,484	50.69%	Won ✓
1990	Bob Casey Sr./Mark Singel	2,065,244	67.63%	Won ✓
1994	Mark Singel/Tom Foley	1,430,099	39.88%	Lost ✗
1998	Ivan Itkin/Marjorie Margolies	938,745	31.03%	Lost ✗
2002	Ed Rendell/Catherine Baker Knoll	1,913,235	53.41%	Won ✓
2006	Ed Rendell/Catherine Baker Knoll	2,470,517	60.36%	Won ✓
2010	Dan Onorato/Scott Conklin	1,814,788	45.51%	Lost ✗
2014	Tom Wolf/Mike Stack	1,920,355	54.93%	Won ✓
2018	Tom Wolf/John Fetterman	2,895,652	57.74%	Won ✓
2022	Josh Shapiro/Austin Davis	3,031,137	56.49%	Won ✓
2026	Josh Shapiro/Austin Davis	3,035,072	60.53%	Won ✓

== See also ==
- Politics of Pennsylvania
- Elections in Pennsylvania
- Political party strength in Pennsylvania
- Pennsylvania Republican Party
