= Daniel H. Hastings =

American politician (1849–1903)

Daniel Hartman Hastings
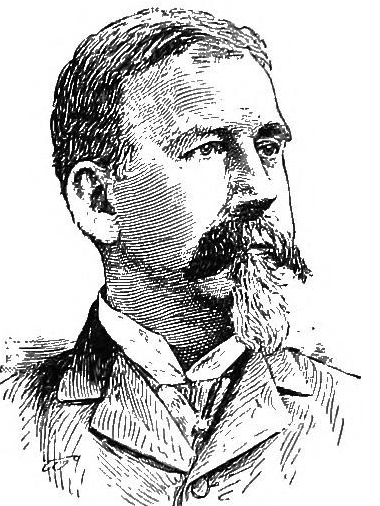

21st Governor of Pennsylvania
- In office January 15, 1895 – January 17, 1899
- Lieutenant: Walter Lyon
- Preceded by: Robert E. Pattison
- Succeeded by: William A. Stone

Personal details
- Born: February 26, 1849 Salona, Pennsylvania, U.S.
- Died: January 9, 1903 (aged 53) Bellefonte, Pennsylvania, U.S.
- Party: Republican
- Spouse: Jane Armstrong Rankin (married 1877)
- Profession: Teacher; Principal; Attorney; Military officer

Daniel Hartman Hastings (February 26, 1849 – January 9, 1903) was the 21st governor of Pennsylvania, serving from 1895 to 1899.

== Biography ==
Daniel H. Hastings was born in Salona, Pennsylvania, on February 26, 1849. He was educated locally, and worked on his father's farm. He tried several times to run away to join the Union Army for the American Civil War, following the example of his three older brothers, but his father stopped him each time.

== Early career ==
At age 14, Hastings became a school teacher in Clinton County, Pennsylvania, a job he held for four years. Named principal of Bellefonte High School at age 18, Hastings carried out the responsibilities of this position while furthering his own education, attending Bellefonte Academy and studying law.

Hastings was admitted to the bar in 1875 and established a successful practice. He also became involved in several businesses, including coal mines and banking. In addition, he was editor of the Bellefonte Republican newspaper.

Involved in local government and civic institutions, Hastings served on the Bellefonte school board, as a town Burgess, a trustee of Bellefonte's Methodist Episcopal Church, and a trustee of Pennsylvania State College and Dickinson College. Daniel Hastings was initiated into Bellefonte Lodge # 268 of Free and Accepted Masons in September 1874. He became their Worshipful Master of in 1878. He was a member of the Bellefonte Chapter # 241 of Royal Arch masons. He became the Eminent Commander of Constans Commandery #33 Knights Templar of Bellefonte in 1886.

== Political career ==
Active in politics as a Republican, in 1878 he managed the successful Congressional campaign of his law partner, Seth Hartman Yocum, a Republican running as a Greenbacker.

In 1882 he was active in the unsuccessful campaign of James A. Beaver for governor. In 1886, he was a delegate to the state Republican convention, and gave the nominating speech for Beaver, who ran successfully for governor. In 1887 he was chairman of the state Republican convention.

Hastings was a delegate to the 1888 Republican National Convention, and gave the nominating speech for John Sherman. He also gave a seconding speech for Levi P. Morton after Morton was nominated for Vice President.

== Military career ==
In July 1877 Hastings joined the Pennsylvania State Militia as paymaster of the 5th Regiment with the rank of Captain. Within a year he had been appointed Lieutenant Colonel and second-in-command of his regiment, and soon afterwards he was appointed assistant adjutant of the Pennsylvania Militia's 2nd Brigade. By 1880 he had been promoted to commander of the 5th Regiment with the rank of colonel.

In 1887, governor and fellow Bellefonte resident James A. Beaver named Hastings as Adjutant General of the state Militia with the rank of major general.

In his role as adjutant general, Hastings led relief efforts following the 1889 Johnstown Flood, for which he gained statewide attention and praise.

== Governor of Pennsylvania ==
Hastings was a candidate for governor in 1890, but Matthew S. Quay, leader of the state Republican Party, succeeded in obtaining the nomination for George W. Delamater, defeating Hastings by only 11 votes.

As a wealthy banker affiliated with Standard Oil, Delamater proved unpopular with many Republicans, who gave him lukewarm support or supported the Democratic nominee, former governor Robert E. Pattison. Pattison had been elected in 1882, and served from 1883 to 1887. Pattison was barred by law to an additional consecutive term and so could not run for reelection. James Beaver defeated Chauncey Forward Black in the 1886, and served from 1887 to 1891. Pattison running again then defeated Delamater in 1890, and served from 1891 to 1895.

Hastings sought the Republican gubernatorial again in 1894. He obtained it, and defeated the Democratic nominee, William M. Singerly. Hastings served one term, 1895 to 1899.

As governor, in 1895 Hastings appointed the first seven judges to the newly created Pennsylvania Superior Court, including former governor Beaver. In addition, his administration included the creation of the Pennsylvania State Game Commission, State Forestry Commission, and Pennsylvania Department of Agriculture. He also signed into a law a measure to replace state property taxes with a tax on corporate profits.

Also in 1895, Hastings enacted the Pennsylvania Capitol Police, the first Pennsylvania police agency under Commonwealth jurisdiction and the second oldest state police organization in the United States, after the Texas Rangers.

In 1897, the State Capitol Building in Harrisburg was destroyed in a fire, and the Hastings administration started efforts to erect a replacement, which was completed in 1906.

Hastings directed the state's response during the Spanish–American War, working with the state legislature to raise troops, supplies and equipment and transport them to mobilization sites, and then taking steps to return soldiers to Pennsylvania and demobilize them at the end of the war.

== Death and burial ==
Following his term, Hastings returned to his law practice and business interests. He died from pneumonia in Bellefonte on January 9, 1903, and was buried at Union Cemetery in Bellefonte.

== Legacy ==
Hastings Hall on the University Park campus of Penn State is named for him.

In 1889 Hastings founded the town of Hastings, Pennsylvania, as part of his coal mining interests, and it was named for him. He also founded the mining towns of Spangler and Bakerton.

In 1895 Hastings received an honorary LL.D. from Dickinson College.

Party political offices
Preceded by George Delamater	Republican nominee for Governor of Pennsylvania; 1894	Succeeded by William A. Stone
Political offices
Preceded by Robert E. Pattison	Governor of Pennsylvania; 1895–1899	Succeeded by William A. Stone
