= John P. S. Gobin =

American politician

7th Lieutenant Governor of Pennsylvania
- In office January 17, 1899 – January 20, 1903
- Governor: William Stone
- Preceded by: Walter Lyon
- Succeeded by: William Brown

President pro tempore of the Pennsylvania Senate
- In office May 28, 1891 – June 1, 1893
- Preceded by: Boies Penrose
- Succeeded by: Wesley Thomas

Member of the Pennsylvania Senate from the 17th district
- In office January 6, 1885 – January 17, 1899
- Preceded by: Cyrus Lantz
- Succeeded by: Samuel Weiss

Personal details
- Born: January 21, 1837 Sunbury, Pennsylvania, U.S.
- Died: May 1, 1910 (aged 73) Lebanon, Pennsylvania, U.S.
- Resting place: Mt. Lebanon Cemetery, Lebanon, Pennsylvania, U.S.
- Party: Republican
- Spouse: Annie M. Howe (1841–1913) (m. 1865)
- Occupation: Attorney; Soldier; Politician

Military service
- Allegiance: United States; Union
- Branch/service: United States Army; Union Army; Pennsylvania National Guard
- Years of service: 1861–1866 (Union Army); 1870–1907 (National Guard)
- Rank: Colonel (USV); Bvt. Brigadier General; Major General (National Guard)
- Commands: 47th Pennsylvania Infantry Regiment; 2nd Brigade, 1st Division, XIX Corps; Coleman Guards; 8th Regiment, Pennsylvania National Guard; 3rd Brigade, Pennsylvania National Guard; Pennsylvania National Guard Division
- Battles/wars: American Civil War; Spanish–American War

John Peter Shindel Gobin (January 21, 1837 – May 1, 1910) was an American politician from Pennsylvania who served as an officer in the Union Army during the Civil War, as a member of the Pennsylvania State Senate for the 17th district from 1885 to 1898 and as the seventh lieutenant governor of Pennsylvania.

Cited for valor multiple times during the Civil War, Gobin was promoted repeatedly, becoming the final commanding officer of the 47th Pennsylvania Infantry Regiment, which was the only regiment from Pennsylvania to serve during the Union's 1864 Red River Campaign across Louisiana.

== Early life and education ==
Gobin was born in Sunbury, Pennsylvania, on January 21, 1837, the oldest of four children of Samuel and Susanna Gobin Shindel. He was educated locally and became an apprentice at the Sunbury American newspaper, where he was trained as a printer. He then read law with M. L. Shindel and John K. Clement, the father of Charles M. Clement, with whom Gobin later served in the National Guard. Gobin was admitted to the bar in 1858, and began to practice in Sunbury.

== Career ==
=== American Civil War ===
In 1861, Gobin enlisted for the American Civil War and was commissioned a first lieutenant in Company F of the 11th Pennsylvania Infantry. After the unit's three-month term of service expired Gobin organized Company C of the 47th Pennsylvania Infantry, which he commanded as a captain.

The 47th Pennsylvania served throughout the rest of the war, primarily in Florida, South Carolina and Virginia, and Gobin rose through the ranks to become the regiment's colonel and commander. Major General Philip H. Sheridan rewarded Gobin for his performance at the Battle of Pocotaligo in South Carolina by recommending him for the brevet rank of brigadier general.

=== Post-civil war ===
On July 6, 1866, U.S. President Andrew Johnson nominated Gobin for appointment to the grade of brevet brigadier general of volunteers, to rank from March 13, 1865, and the United States Senate confirmed the appointment on July 23, 1866. Near the end of the war, he commanded 2nd Brigade, 1st Division, XIX Corps. After the surrender of the Confederacy, Gobin served as a Provost Marshal in South Carolina and Georgia until he was mustered out of the service on January 9, 1866.

After the Civil War, Gobin moved to Lebanon, Pennsylvania, where he resumed the practice of law. He was also active in the Grand Army of the Republic and the Military Order of the Loyal Legion of the United States. From 1897 to 1898 he was the G.A.R.'s national commander.

In addition to practicing law, Gobin was active in several businesses, including the local gas lighting company, the First National Bank of Lebanon, the City Mutual Fire Insurance Company and the Cornwall & Lebanon Railroad.

Gobin also carried out several civic responsibilities, including member of the board of trustees of Pennsylvania's Soldiers' and Sailors' Home, member of the board of commissioners of the Soldiers' Orphans Home, and member of the board of commissioners of the Gettysburg Monument Association.

== Political career ==
A Republican, Gobin was elected to the Pennsylvania State Senate for the 17th district in 1884 and served from 1885 to 1899. He was the body's President pro tempore from 1891 through 1893.

In 1898, Gobin was elected lieutenant governor, and he served from 1899 to 1903.

== Continued military service ==
In 1870 Gobin returned to military service as a member of the Pennsylvania Army National Guard, commanding a company in Lebanon called the Coleman Guards with the rank of captain. In 1874 he was named commander of the 8th Regiment with the rank of colonel. In 1885 he was promoted to brigadier general as commander of the 3rd Brigade.

In 1898 Gobin was appointed to command his brigade when it was federalized for the Spanish–American War. He led his brigade during mobilization and training near Augusta, Georgia, but resigned in order to run for lieutenant governor, and returned to National Guard service in Pennsylvania.

In 1906 he was promoted to major general as commander of the Pennsylvania National Guard Division, succeeding Charles Miller. He commanded the division until he retired in 1907, and was succeeded by John A. Wiley.

== Additional activities ==
Gobin was also a member of the Freemasons, Knights Templar, and Odd Fellows. He served as Grand Master of the Grand Encampment of Knights Templar in North America from 1889 to 1892.

== Death and burial ==
Gobin died in Lebanon on May 1, 1910. He was interred at Mt. Lebanon Cemetery in Lebanon, Pennsylvania.

== See also ==
- List of American Civil War brevet generals (Union)

Political offices
Preceded by Walter Lyon	Lieutenant Governor of Pennsylvania; 1899–1903	Succeeded by William Brown
Preceded by Boies Penrose	President pro tempore of the Pennsylvania Senate; 1891–1893	Succeeded by Wesley Thomas
Pennsylvania State Senate
Preceded by Cyrus Lantz	Member of the Pennsylvania Senate for the 17th District; 1885–1899	Succeeded by Samuel Weiss
Party political offices
Preceded by Walter Lyon	Republican nominee for Lieutenant Governor of Pennsylvania; 1898	Succeeded by William Brown
