= General Blair =

General Blair may refer to:

- Chandos Blair (1919–2011), British Army lieutenant general
- Charles F. Blair Jr. (1909–1978), U.S. Air Force brigadier general
- Charles W. Blair (1829–1899), Union Army brevet brigadier general
- Francis Preston Blair Jr. (1821–1875), Missouri Volunteers major general in the Civil War
- James Blair (Indian Army officer) (1828–1905), British Indian Army general
- James Blair (South Carolina politician) (1786–1834), South Carolina Militia general
- William H. Blair (1821–1888), Pennsylvania Volunteer Infantry post-service brevet brigadier general

== See also ==
- Attorney General Blair (disambiguation)
