= Louis Arthur Watres =

American politician (1851–1937)

Louis A. Watres
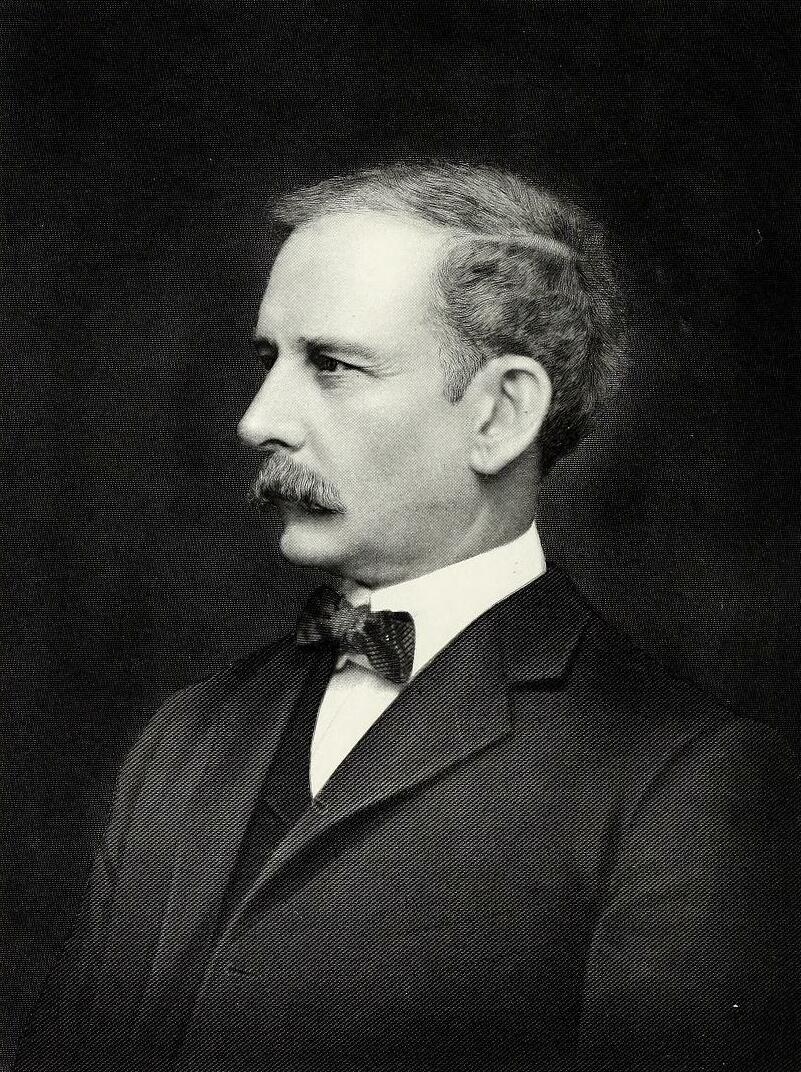

5th Lieutenant Governor of Pennsylvania
- In office January 20, 1891 – January 23, 1895
- Governor: Robert E. Pattison
- Preceded by: William T. Davies
- Succeeded by: Walter Lyon

Member of the Pennsylvania Senate for the 20th district
- In office 1883–1890
- Preceded by: George B. Seamons
- Succeeded by: Michael E. McDonald

Personal details
- Born: April 21, 1851 Jessup, Pennsylvania, US
- Died: June 28, 1937 (aged 86) Pennsylvania, US
- Party: Republican
- Spouse: Effie J. Hawley
- Children: 3, incl. Laurence
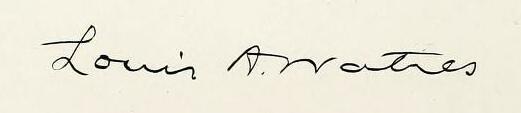
- Signature

Louis Arthur Watres (April 21, 1851 – June 28, 1937) was an American politician from Pennsylvania who served as a Republican member of the Pennsylvania State Senate for the 20th district from 1883 to 1890 and as the fifth lieutenant governor of Pennsylvania from 1891 to 1895.

== Biography ==
Watres was born on April 21, 1851, in Jessup, Pennsylvania (known as the borough of Winton at the time) to Lewis S. Watres, a pioneer developer of the Lackawanna Valley. He later moved with his family to Scranton, Pennsylvania.

In 1877, he joined the Pennsylvania National Guard as a private. He served as captain of Company A of the 13th Regiment, Colonel of the 11th Regiment, judge advocate of the Division Staff, general inspector of rifle practice on the staff of Governor James A. Beaver and as commander of the 13th Regiment after the unit returned from duty in the Spanish-American War. He became the first president of the Pennsylvania National Guard and served in that capacity for two years. He was a member of the Armory Board of Pennsylvania and a key sponsor for the construction of the 109th Regiment Armory in Scranton, Pennsylvania.

He studied law and was admitted to the Lackawanna County bar in 1878. Watres served as the solicitor for Lackawanna County government from 1881 to 1890. He served as a member of the Pennsylvania State Senate for the 20th district from 1883 to 1890. He was a member of the Judiciary General and Appropriations committees. He served as Lieutenant Governor from 1891 to 1895.

He was a successful businessman and worked as president of the Scranton Passenger Railway Company, the County Savings Bank, the Title Guarantee and Trust Company, the Economy Light, Heat and Power Company, the Pittston Slate Company and the Boulevard Company. He was a partner in the development of the Springbrook Water Company. He was the owner of the Mansfield Water Company and promoted the construction of the Wilsonville Dam on Wallenpaupack Creek which created Lake Wallenpaupack.

He purchased the Scranton Truth newspaper in 1908 and The Scranton-Tribune Republican in 1915. He merged the two newspapers and continued working as editor until 1934 when he sold it to Frank D. Schroth.

In 1913, Watres purchased 15,000 acres along the Wallenpaupack Creek for $15,000. The land purchase included Lacawac, the estate previously owned by Congressman William Connell, which Watres used as a summer home.

From 1916 through 1917, he served as Grand Master of the Grand Lodge of Pennsylvania, Free and Accepted Masons. From 1934 to 1937 Watres served as the Executive Officer of the Order of DeMolay in Pennsylvania, later serving as Grand Master of the International Supreme Council of the Order of DeMolay in 1936–1937. He was a key member of the committee established to construct the George Washington Masonic National Memorial in Alexandria, Virginia.

== Legacy ==
In 1925, Lafayette College conferred the honorary degree of LL.D to Watres.

He died on July 28, 1937.

The 109th Regiment Armory in Scranton, Pennsylvania, is known as the "Watres Armory".

His second son, Laurence Hawley Watres, became a U.S. Representative for Pennsylvania's 11th congressional district.

Party political offices
| Preceded by William T. Davies | Republican nominee for Lieutenant Governor of Pennsylvania; 1890 | Succeeded by Walter Lyon |
Pennsylvania State Senate
| Preceded by George B. Seamons | Member of the Pennsylvania Senate, 20th district 1883-1890 | Succeeded by Michael E. McDonald |
Political offices
| Preceded by William T. Davies | Lieutenant Governor of Pennsylvania; 1891–1895 | Succeeded by Walter Lyon |
Masonic offices
| Preceded by J. Henry Williams | Grand Master of the Grand Lodge of Pennsylvania; 1916–1917 | Succeeded by James B. Krause |
