= Jean Milko =

Chairperson of the Allegheny County Democratic Party
- In office March 31, 2005 – June 11, 2006
- Preceded by: Tom Flaherty
- Succeeded by: Jim Burn

Personal details
- Born: 1934 (age 91–92) Braddock, Pennsylvania, United States
- Party: Democratic Party

Jean Ann Milko is an American politician who has served as vice chair of the Pennsylvania Democratic Party.

A member of the Democratic National Committee from the Commonwealth of Pennsylvania in 2004, she previously served as a delegate from Pennsylvania to the Democratic National Convention in 1972 and 2000. She then continued her service as a delegate in 2004 and 2008.

== Biography ==
Jean A. Milko was born in Braddock, Pennsylvania in 1934.

Milko was a delegate to the Democratic National Convention from Pennsylvania in 1972, 2000, 2004, and 2008, and a member of the Democratic National Committee from Pennsylvania in 2004.

Between 1974 and 2000, she was the only jury commissioner in Allegheny County, Pennsylvania who was a member of the Democratic Party. In May 2001, she defeated Stephen Bokor to win the Democratic primary election for the Allegheny County jury commissioner's seat. She then ran unopposed in the November general election that year.
