= Walter Lyon (politician) =

American politician (1853–1933)

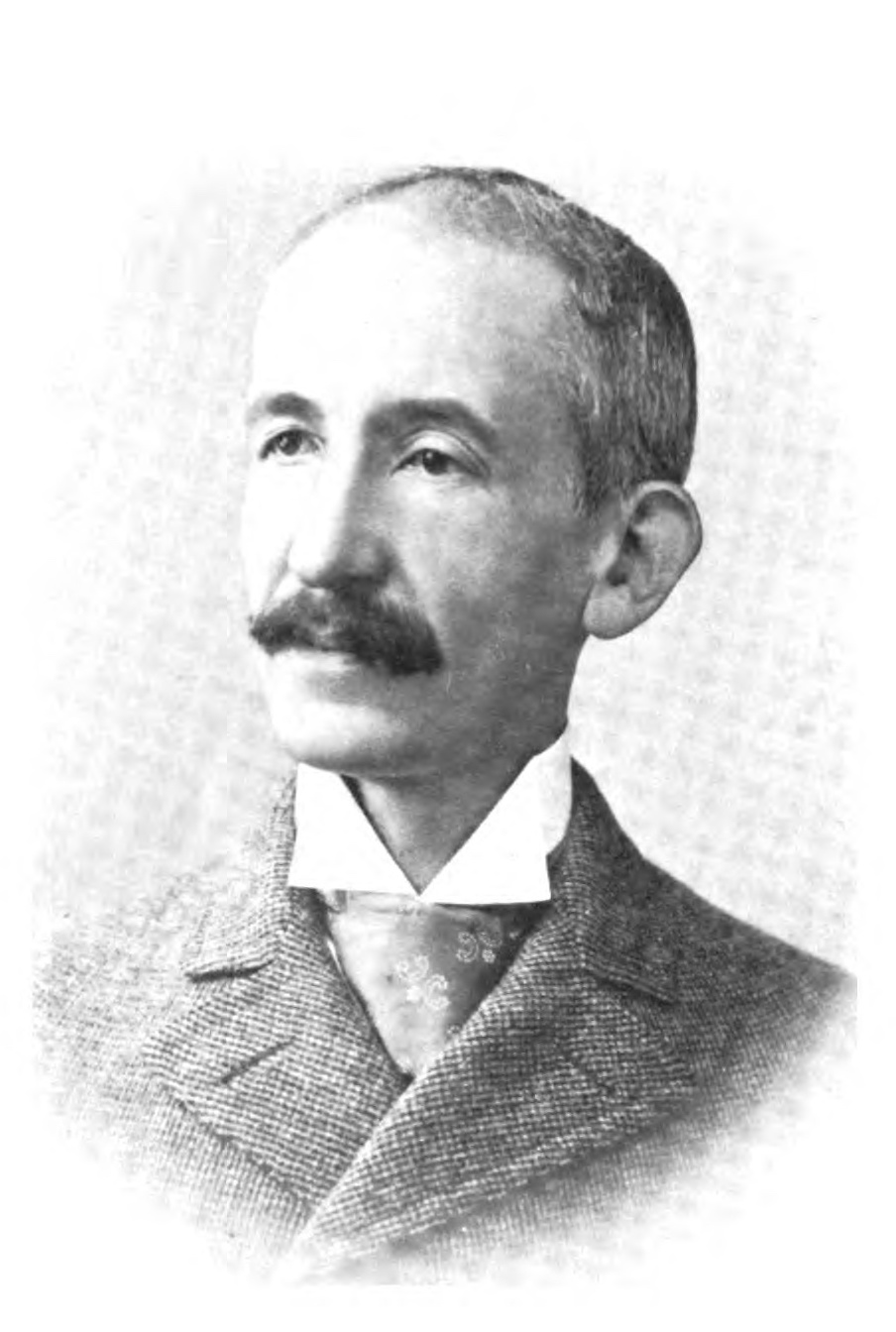

6th Lieutenant Governor of Pennsylvania
- In office January 20, 1895 – January 15, 1899
- Governor: Daniel H. Hastings
- Preceded by: Louis Arthur Watres
- Succeeded by: John P. S. Gobin

Member of the Pennsylvania Senate
- In office 1893

Personal details
- Born: April 27, 1853
- Died: March 21, 1933 (aged 79)
- Party: Republican

Walter Lyon (April 27, 1853 – March 21, 1933) was an American lawyer and politician who served as the sixth lieutenant governor of Pennsylvania as a Republican from 1895 to 1899.

Lyon was born in Shaler Township, Pennsylvania. He was educated at the Wakeam Academy and was admitted to the bar as an attorney in 1876. In 1889, he was appointed as United States District Attorney for the Western District of Pennsylvania. He resigned from this position in 1893 to run for Pennsylvania State Senate; he served in this body for one term until his election as Lieutenant Governor. After leaving politics, he founded the Pittsburgh law firm of Lyon, Hunter & Burke. He later retired to Sewickley, Pennsylvania.

Party political offices
Preceded by Louis Arthur Watres	Republican nominee for Lieutenant Governor of Pennsylvania; 1894	Succeeded by John P. S. Gobin
Political offices
Preceded by Louis A. Watres	Lieutenant Governor of Pennsylvania; 1895–1899	Succeeded by John P. S. Gobin
