= 1894 Pennsylvania gubernatorial election =

- November 6, 1894
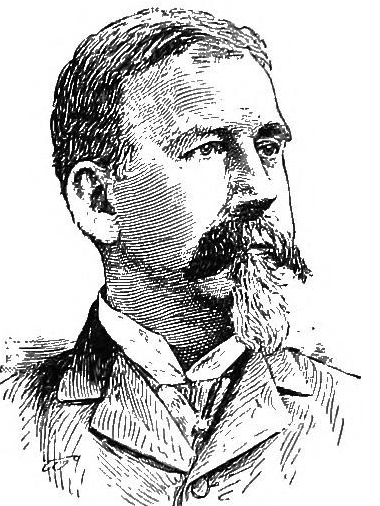

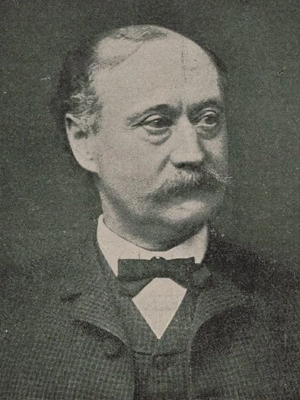
Nominee	Daniel H. Hastings	William M. Singerly
Party	Republican	Democratic
Popular vote	574,801	333,404
Percentage	60.31%	34.98%
- County results Hastings: 40–50% 50–60% 60–70% 70–80% Singerly: 40–50% 50–60% 60–70%
Governor before election
Robert E. Pattison
Democratic
Elected Governor
Daniel H. Hastings
Republican

The 1894 Pennsylvania gubernatorial election occurred on November 6, 1894. Republican candidate Daniel H. Hastings defeated Democratic candidate William M. Singerly to become Governor of Pennsylvania.

== Results ==
Pennsylvania gubernatorial election, 1894
Party	Candidate	Votes	%
Republican	Daniel H. Hastings	574,801	60.31
Democratic	William M. Singerly	333,404	34.98
Prohibition	Charles L. Hawley	23,433	2.46
Populist	Jerome T. Ailman	19,464	2.04
Socialist Labor	Thomas H. Grundy	1,733	0.18
Independent	James B. Corey	122	0.01
N/A	Other	60	0.01
Total votes		953,017	100.00
