= Attorney General Blair =

Attorney General Blair may refer to:

- Charles A. Blair (1854–1912), Attorney General of Michigan
- Francis Preston Blair Jr. (1821–1875), Attorney General for the New Mexico Territory
- Frank S. Blair (1839–1899), Attorney General of Virginia
- James Blair (Australian judge) (1870–1944), Attorney-General of Queensland

== See also ==
- General Blair (disambiguation)
