= Marcel Groen =

American politician (born 1945)

Chair of the Pennsylvania Democratic Party
- In office September 12, 2015 – February 2, 2018
- Preceded by: Jim Burn
- Succeeded by: Nancy Patton Mills

Personal details
- Born: November 2, 1945 (age 81) Amsterdam, Netherlands
- Party: Democratic
- Education: Temple University (BA, JD)

Marcel L. Groen (Born November 2, 1945) is an American lawyer and the former chairman of the Pennsylvania Democratic Party from 2015 until his resignation on February 2, 2018. Before being selected as the state party chairman, Groen's political experience in Pennsylvania included as Finance Chair of the Bucks County and Montgomery County Democratic Parties as well as Chairman of Montgomery County Democratic Committee since 1994.

== Early life and education ==
Groen was born November 2, 1945, in Amsterdam, Netherlands, the son of Rabbi Nardus and Sipora Groen, a holocaust survivor. Groen and his family came to America when he was 10 years old.

Groen graduated from Walnut Hills High School, Cincinnati, Ohio, in 1963. He received a BA from Temple University in 1967 and a JD from Temple University School of Law in 1970.

== Career ==
Groen was the founding partner of Groen, Laveson, Goldberg & Rubenstone in Bucks County, Pennsylvania. He is a member of the Pennsylvania Bar Association, Montgomery County Bar Association, Bucks County Bar Association. Groen was a partner at Fox Rothschild LLP working out of the Montgomery County, Pennsylvania office.

=== Controversy ===
In 2017 and 2018, Groen came under fire for his alleged failure to respond to calls to address what female party leaders and local activists have characterized as a culture of sexual predation within the party. Critics cite Groen's silence on sexual misconduct allegations against prominent state politicians, his failure to fulfill a commitment to create a party sexual misconduct policy after the alleged sexual assault of a state party delegate at the 2016 DNC, and his anger over calls to dismiss a close aide's controversial statements about the #MeToo movement as evidence of Groen's unwillingness to address sexual misconduct within the party.

Party political offices
Preceded by Jim Burn	Chair of the Pennsylvania Democratic Party; 2015–2018	Succeeded by Jack Hanna; Acting
