= William T. Davies =

American politician (1831–1912)

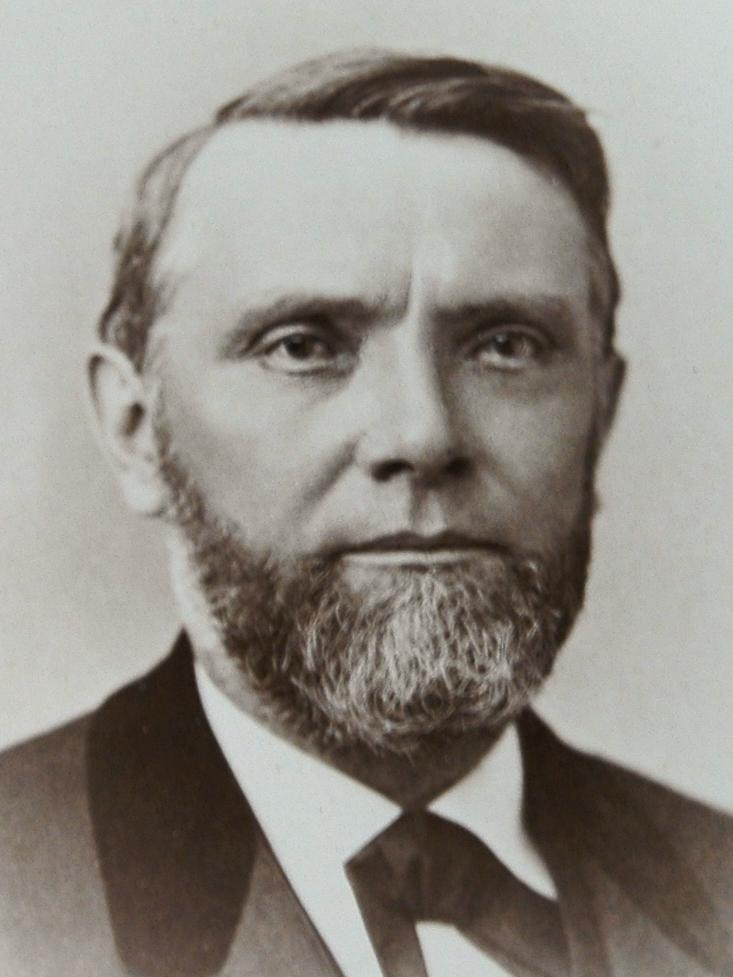
- Davies circa 1901

4th Lieutenant Governor of Pennsylvania
- In office January 18, 1887 – January 20, 1891
- Governor: James A. Beaver
- Preceded by: Chauncey Forward Black
- Succeeded by: Louis Arthur Watres

Member of the Pennsylvania House of Representatives
- In office 1877-1885

Personal details
- Born: William Tecumseh Davies; December 20, 1831 Glamorgan, Wales
- Died: September 21, 1912 (aged 80) Towanda, Pennsylvania, US
- Party: Republican
- Occupation: Lawyer, politician

William Tecumseh Davies (December 20, 1831 – September 21, 1912) was an American lawyer and politician who served as a Pennsylvania state senator and as the fourth lieutenant governor of Pennsylvania from 1887 to 1891.

Davies was born in Glamorgan, Wales. His family emigrated to Towanda, Pennsylvania, in his youth. He volunteered to serve in the Union Army in the American Civil War and rose to the rank of captain but received a medical discharge in 1863. He was admitted to the bar as an attorney in 1861 and was elected as district attorney of Bradford County, Pennsylvania, in 1865.

A member of the Republican Party, Davies was later elected to two terms as a member of the Pennsylvania State Senate representing Bradford and Wyoming counties from 1877 to 1885.

Party political offices
Preceded by Charles W. Stone	Republican nominee for Lieutenant Governor of Pennsylvania; 1882, 1886	Succeeded by Louis Arthur Watres
Political offices
Preceded by Chauncey Forward Black	Lieutenant Governor of Pennsylvania; 1887–1891	Succeeded by Louis Arthur Watres
