= Jim Burn =

American politician

Chair of the Pennsylvania Democratic Party
- In office June 19, 2010 – 2015
- Preceded by: T. J. Rooney
- Succeeded by: Marcel Groen

President of the Allegheny County Council
- In office March 1, 2011 – January 3, 2012
- Preceded by: Rich Fitzgerald
- Succeeded by: Charles Martoni

Member of the Allegheny County Council from the 3rd District
- Incumbent
- Assumed office January 3, 2006
- Preceded by: Edward Kress

Chairperson of the Allegheny County Democratic Party
- In office June 11, 2006 – January 2, 2012
- Preceded by: Jean Milko
- Succeeded by: Nancy Mills

Personal details
- Party: Democratic Party
- Spouse: Lori
- Children: 2-James Edward, Brandon Patrick
- Education: Duquesne University; University of Dayton
- Profession: Attorney, Martial Arts Instructor

James R. Burn, Jr. is an American attorney and martial arts instructor. Over a 22-year period of public service, he has served as mayor of Millvale Borough in Allegheny County, Allegheny County Council Chairman of the Allegheny County Democratic Committee and the Pennsylvania Democratic Party.

Burn graduated from Duquesne University in 1985 and obtained his J.D. at the University of Dayton in 1988, where he was president of the Student Bar Association and the Phi Delta Phi fraternity.

Burn was mayor of Millvale, Pennsylvania from 1994 to 2005 and served on the Allegheny County Council from 2006 to 2013, with a term as its president in 2011. He has chaired the Millvale Democratic Committee, Allegheny County Democratic Committee, and the Pennsylvania Democratic Party, where he served a five-year term.
