= 1890 Pennsylvania gubernatorial election =

- November 4, 1890
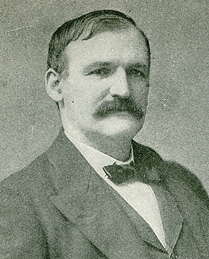

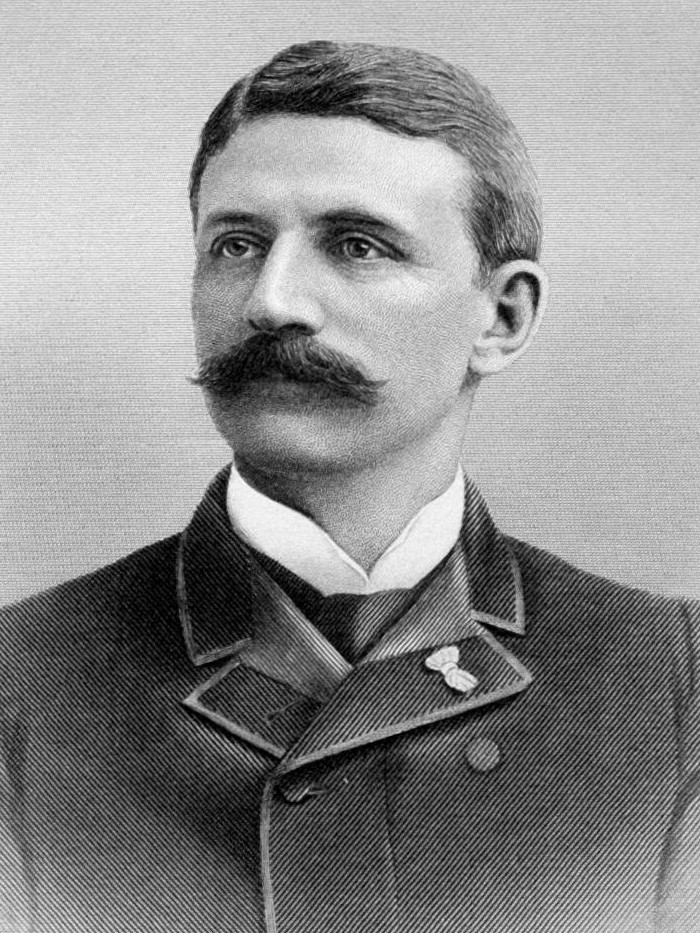
Nominee	Robert E. Pattison	George Delamater
Party	Democratic	Republican
Popular vote	464,209	447,655
Percentage	50.01%	48.23%
- County results Pattison: 40–50% 50–60% 60–70% 70–80% Delamater: 40–50% 50–60% 60–70%
Governor before election
James A. Beaver
Republican
Elected Governor
Robert E. Pattison
Democratic

The 1890 Pennsylvania gubernatorial election occurred on November 4, 1890. Democratic candidate and former Governor Robert E. Pattison defeated Republican candidate George W. Delamater to become Governor of Pennsylvania.

As of the 2022 midterm elections, this is the last presidential, gubernatorial, or senatorial election in Pennsylvania where the Democratic candidate won the state without carrying Allegheny County. William A. Wallace and Chauncey Forward Black unsuccessfully sought the Democratic nomination.

== Results ==
Pennsylvania gubernatorial election, 1890
Party	Candidate	Votes	%
Democratic	Robert E. Pattison	464,209	50.01
Republican	George W. Delamater	447,655	48.23
Prohibition	John E. Gill	16,108	1.74
Socialist Labor	Theodore P. Rynder	224	0.02
N/A	Other	3	0.00
Total votes		928,199	100.00
