= George W. Harris =

- Born: March 6, 1835; Schuylkill County, Pennsylvania, US
- Died: January 30, 1921 (aged 85); Bellefonte, Pennsylvania, US
- Burial place: Union Cemetery, Bellefonte, Pennsylvania
- Military career
- Allegiance: United States; Union
- Branch: United States Army; Union army
- Service years: 1862 - 1865
- Rank: Private
- Units: Company B, 148th Pennsylvania Infantry
- Conflicts: American Civil War: Battle of Chancellorsville; Battle of Gettysburg; Battle of Wapping Heights; Mine Run Campaign; Battle of Spotsylvania Court House; Battle of Cold Harbor; Siege of Petersburg; First Battle of Deep Bottom; Battle of the Crater; Second Battle of Deep Bottom; Second Battle of Ream's Station; Battle of White Oak Road
- Awards: Medal of Honor

George W. Harris (March 6, 1835 – January 30, 1921) was a United States soldier who fought with the Union army during the American Civil War as a private with Company B of the 148th Pennsylvania Infantry, a regiment which "was present in every battle of the Army of the Potomac from Chancellorsville to the surrender at Appomattox and was in the hottest fighting of all of them except the Wilderness".

On December 1, 1864, he received his nation's highest award for valor, the U.S. Medal of Honor, for capturing the enemy's flag while engaged in hand-to-hand combat with the enemy during the Battle of Spotsylvania Court House on May 12, 1864.

== Formative years ==
Harris was born on March 6, 1835, in Schuylkill County, Pennsylvania. During the early years of the American Civil War, he was employed as a sailor.

== Civil War ==
=== 1862 ===
On August 15, 1862, at the age of 33, Harris enrolled for Civil War military service at Milesburg, Centre County, Pennsylvania. He then officially mustered in for duty at Camp Curtin in Harrisburg as a private with Company B of the 148th Pennsylvania Infantry on August 29.

Transported to Cockeysville, Maryland, from September 9–10, 1862, Harris and his fellow 148th Pennsylvania Volunteers remained there until December 9 when they were transported to the field, by way of Baltimore and Washington, D.C. Marched to the front lines of the war on December 11, they were assigned to the First Brigade, First Division, Second Corps upon reaching the Army of the Potomac's headquarters in Falmouth, Virginia, on December 17. The regiment was provided with tents on Christmas Day, 1862.

=== 1863 ===
They were equipped with Springfield rifles on January 17, 1863. On April 7, they participated in a review of Union army troops by President Abraham Lincoln. By the end of that month, they were engaged in their first major test of combat — the Battle of Chancellorsville. After burying the last of their casualties on June 16, they marched for Pennsylvania where, from July 1–3, they fought in the Battle of Gettysburg. Afterward, they marched for Maryland and then Virginia where, on July 23, they supported the U.S. Army's Third Corps in the Battle of Wapping Heights. Engaged in the Union army's Port Conway Expedition from August 31-September 4, they continued to pursue enemy troops throughout Virginia during the months of September and October. On September 24, they were transferred to the Third Brigade. On October 14, they fought in the battles of Auburn Mills/Coffee Hill and Bristoe Station. In late November, they embarked on the Mine Run Campaign.

=== 1864 ===
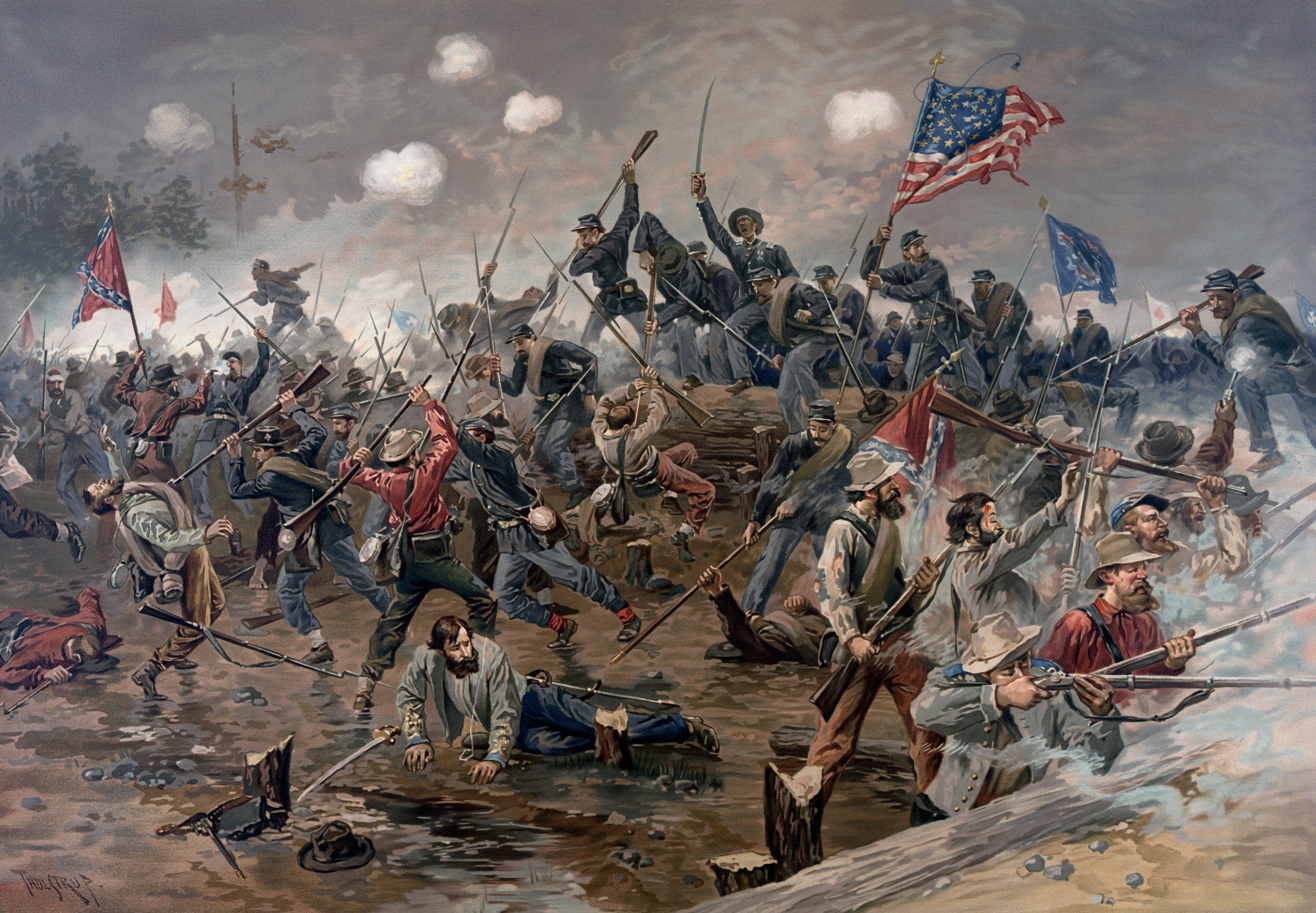
Battle of Spottsylvania, March 12, 1864 (Thure de Thulstrup, 1886).

After emerging from winter quarters in March 1864, Harris and his fellow 148th Pennsylvanians were attached to the Fourth Brigade. On April 22, they marched in the Grand Review overseen by Union General Ulysses S. Grant. Marching for the Wilderness on May 4, they next engaged the enemy in the Battle of Po River on May 10 near Spottsylvania. Two days later, on May 12, 1864, Harris performed the act of valor for which he would later receive the U.S. Medal of Honor. While engaged with his regiment in charging the "Mule Shoe", a salient exposed during the Battle of Spottsylvania, he wrested the enemy's flag from a Confederate States Army color-bearer, and then shot a second CSA officer who attempted to retrieve it.

Engaging the enemy again near Spottsylvania on May 18, Harris and the 148th Pennsylvania then fought in the Battle of Cold Harbor on June 3. After the regiment buried the last of its dead, they withdrew to Wilcox Landing and, beginning June 16, participated with other Union troops in the Siege of Petersburg. Engaged in the Battle of Hare House on June 16 and the fighting at Fort Stedman against the second line of Confederate General Robert E. Lee, they also skirmished with the enemy three days later near Williams House. On July 27, 1864, they captured a Confederate artillery battery in the First Battle of Deep Bottom, fought in the Battle of the Crater (July 30), fought in the Second Battle of Deep Bottom (August 14–20), helped to destroy the Weldon Railroad (August 22), fought in the Second Battle of Ream's Station (August 25), and then skirmished off and on with the enemy while stationed in and around Forts Stedman, Rice and Morton during the months of September and October. On December 1, Harris and his fellow B Company soldiers were assigned with those from the 148th Pennsylvania's D, E, H, and I companies to garrison Fort Gregg. Five days later, on December 6, the U.S. Medal of Honor was presented to Harris personally by Major-General George Meade, commanding officer of the U.S. Army of the Potomac, during a formal ceremony in front of the 148th Pennsylvania and other Union troops near Petersburg, Virginia at the Peebles' House, which had been taken over by the Union for use as the headquarters of the U.S. Second Army Corps.

=== 1865 ===
After departing their winter quarters in early February 1865, Harris and his fellow 148th Pennsylvanians captured an enemy position near Tucker House on February 5 as part of the ongoing Richmond-Petersburg Campaign, engaged the enemy a mile outside of Fort Cummings (March 25), supported their brigade's operations along the Boydton Plank Road (March 29–30), and then fought in the Battle of White Oak Road at Gravelly Road near Five Forks on March 31, 1865. Also known as the Battle of Hatcher's Run, it was here that Harris was grievously wounded in action. Having sustained a gunshot wound to the chest which impacted his lungs, he was treated at a Union army hospital before being transferred to the U.S. Veteran Reserve Corps (also known as the "invalid corps").

After a brief period of service with the VRC, Harris was then discharged honorably on May 11, 1865.

== Post-war life ==
Following his honorable discharge from the military, Harris returned home to Pennsylvania. In 1871, he wed Centre County native Hannah Stratton. Childless for the duration of their marriage, the couple resided in Milesburg, Pennsylvania, during the 1880s, 1890s and early part of the new century. By 1904, they were residing in Runville, Pennsylvania, near Bellefonte in Centre County.

Preceded in death by his wife in 1906, Harris died in Bellefonte roughly fifteen years later at age 85, and was buried in that community's Union Cemetery. Although his original headstone was carved with an incorrect death year (1920), a newer, government-issued headstone was carved with the correct death date of January 30, 1921, which was documented in his U.S Civil War Pension file and the U.S. Veterans Administration Pension Payment Cards maintained by the U.S. National Archives. The latter record system also documented the steady increase in his pension rate from $15 per month in 1907 to $72 per month at the time of his death.

== Medal of Honor citation ==
Rank and organization: Private, Company B, 148th Pennsylvania Infantry. Place and date: At Spotsylvania, Va., May 12, 1864. Entered service at: Bellefonte, Pa. Birth: Schuylkill, Pa. Date of issue: December 1, 1864. Citation:

Capture of flag, wresting it from the color bearer and shooting an officer who attempted to regain it.

== See also ==
- List of American Civil War Medal of Honor recipients: G–L
- Pennsylvania in the American Civil War
- Battle of Chancellorsville
- Battle of Gettysburg
- Battle of Wapping Heights
- Mine Run Campaign
- Battle of Spotsylvania Court House
- Battle of Cold Harbor
- Siege of Petersburg
- First Battle of Deep Bottom
- Battle of the Crater
- Second Battle of Deep Bottom
- Second Battle of Ream's Station
- Battle of White Oak Road
