= Union Cemetery (Bellefonte, Pennsylvania) =

Coordinates: 40.9140°N 77.7722°W

- Interactive map of Union Cemetery

Details
- Established: 1795
- Location: East Howard Street, Bellefonte, Pennsylvania, U.S.

Union Cemetery located on East Howard Street in Bellefonte, Pennsylvania was established in 1795. Burials at the cemetery began in 1808, and the cemetery was formally chartered in 1856.

The cemetery is the final resting place of several prominent residents of Pennsylvania, including Bellefonte's founding families, Pennsylvania governors and their wives, U.S. Congressmen, war heroes, and veterans, including Black soldiers from the Union's Army of the James during the American Civil War. Evan Pugh, the first president of the Pennsylvania State University is buried in the cemetery.

== Notable interments ==
Notable people buried at the Union Cemetery:

Name	Notable event or occupation
Andrew G. Curtin	Governor of Pennsylvania; U.S. Congressman; U.S. Ambassador to Russia
William W. Potter	U.S. Congressman
John I. Curtin	American Civil War Union Brevet Brigadier General
John Blanchard	U.S. Congressman
James Irvin	U.S. Congressman
Thomas Burnside	U.S. Congressman; Supreme Court of Pennsylvania Associate Justice; Pennsylvania State Senator
Andrew Gregg	U.S. Congressman; U.S. Senator; President pro tempore of the United States Senate; Secretary of State of Pennsylvania
Evan Pugh	President of the Pennsylvania State University
James T. Hale	U.S. Congressman
James A. Beaver	American Civil War Union Brevet Brigadier General; Governor of Pennsylvania; President of the Pennsylvania State University
Hiram M. Hiller	Medical missionary and ethnographer
Daniel H. Hastings	Governor of Pennsylvania
George W. Harris	Union Army American Civil War Medal of Honor Recipient
William H. Blair	American Civil War Union Brevet Brigadier General
