= Lieutenant Governor of Pennsylvania =

Constitutional officer of the Commonwealth of Pennsylvania

Lieutenant Governor of the Commonwealth of Pennsylvania
- Flag of Pennsylvania

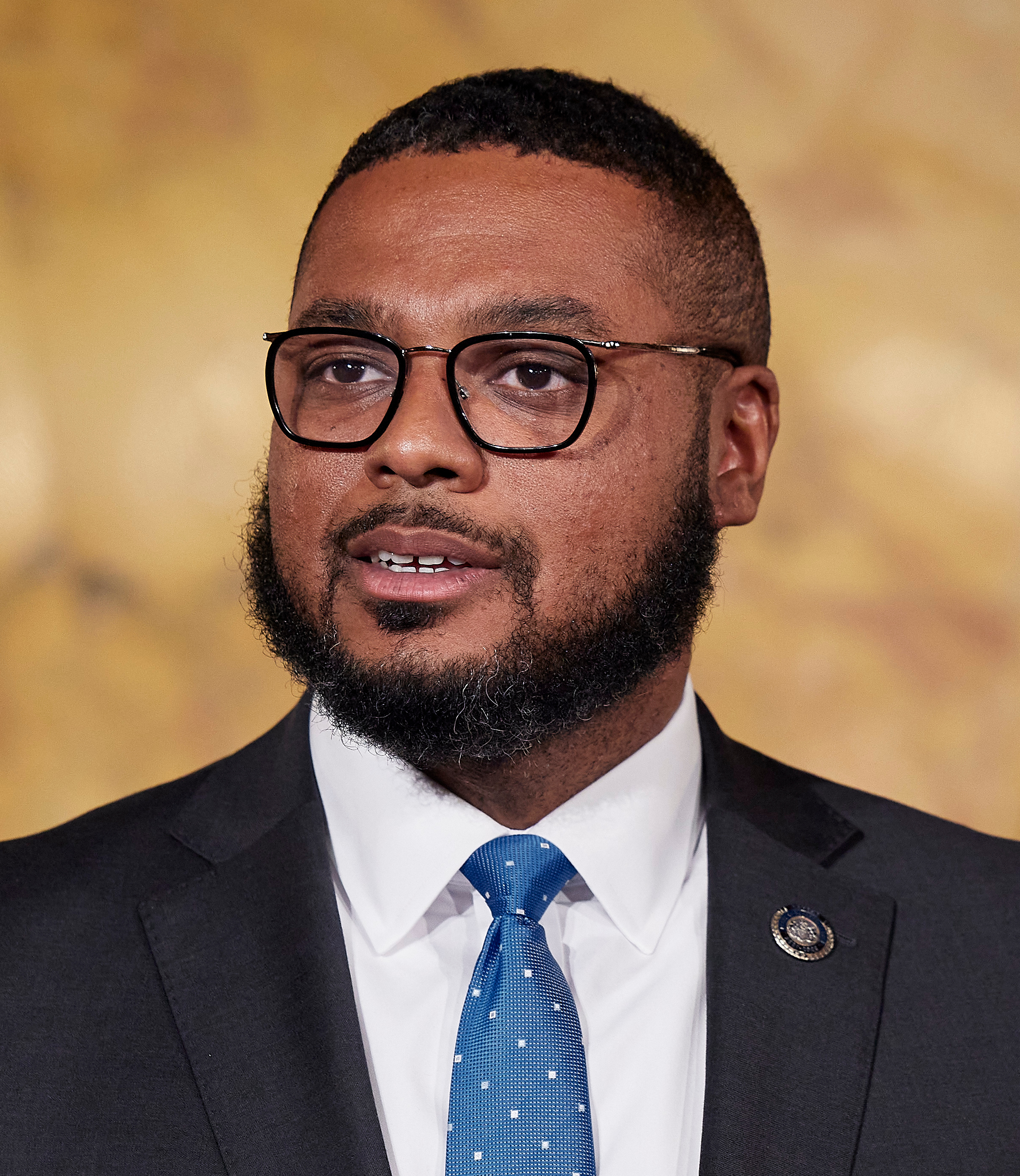
- Incumbent; Austin Davis since January 17, 2023
- Residence: Private; State House (1971–2019)
- Term length: Four years, renewable once consecutively
- Inaugural holder: John Latta
- Formation: 1873
- Succession: First
- Salary: $157,765 (2014)
- Website: Official website

The lieutenant governor of Pennsylvania is a constitutional officer of the Commonwealth of Pennsylvania. The lieutenant governor is elected for a four-year term in the same year as the governor. Each party picks a candidate for lieutenant governor independently of the gubernatorial primary. The winners of the party primaries are then teamed together as a single ticket for the fall general election. The lieutenant governor presides in the Pennsylvania State Senate and is first in the line of succession to the governor; in the event the governor dies, resigns, or otherwise leaves office, the lieutenant governor becomes governor. The lieutenant governor casts tie breaking votes in the State Senate on procedural matters, but not final passage of bills.

The office of lieutenant governor was created by the Constitution of 1873. As with the governor's position, the Constitution of 1968 made lieutenant governors eligible to succeed themselves for one additional four-year term. The position's only official duties are serving as president of the State Senate and chairing the Board of Pardons and the Pennsylvania Emergency Management Council. Lieutenant governors often work on additional projects and have a full schedule of community and speaking events.

Until 2019, Pennsylvania was the only state that provided an official residence, State House at Fort Indiantown Gap, for its lieutenant governor. Constructed in 1940 and previously the governor's "summer residence", it became available for Pennsylvania's lieutenant governor in 1968 when the current governor's residence was completed in Harrisburg. It was transferred to the state's Department of Military and Veterans Affairs after legislation to do so passed in 2019.

The current lieutenant governor is Austin Davis, who took office on January 17, 2023.

== List of lieutenant governors ==
Parties

Democratic (11) Republican (24)

No.	Image	Name	Party	Took office	Left office	Governor(s) served under	Party
1		John Latta	Democratic	January 19, 1875	January 21, 1879	John F. Hartranft	Republican
2		Charles W. Stone	Republican	January 21, 1879	January 16, 1883	Henry M. Hoyt	Republican
3		Chauncey Forward Black	Democratic	January 16, 1883	January 12, 1887	Robert E. Pattison	Democratic
4		William T. Davies	Republican	January 18, 1887	January 20, 1891	James A. Beaver	Republican
5		Louis Arthur Watres	Republican	January 20, 1891	January 23, 1895	Robert E. Pattison	Democratic
6		Walter Lyon	Republican	January 20, 1895	January 15, 1899	Daniel H. Hastings	Republican
7		John P. S. Gobin	Republican	January 17, 1899	January 20, 1903	William A. Stone	Republican
8		William M. Brown	Republican	January 20, 1903	January 15, 1907	Samuel W. Pennypacker	Republican
9		Robert S. Murphy	Republican	January 15, 1907	January 17, 1911	Edwin Sydney Stuart	Republican
10		John Merriman Reynolds	Republican	January 17, 1911	January 19, 1915	John K. Tener	Republican
11		Frank B. McClain	Republican	January 20, 1915	January 15, 1919	Martin Grove Brumbaugh	Republican
12		Edward E. Beidleman	Republican	January 20, 1919	January 15, 1923	William Cameron Sproul	Republican
13		David J. Davis	Republican	January 20, 1923	January 18, 1927	Gifford Pinchot	Republican
14		Arthur James	Republican	January 18, 1927	January 20, 1931	John Stuchell Fisher	Republican
15		Edward C. Shannon	Republican	January 20, 1931	January 15, 1935	Gifford Pinchot	Republican
16		Thomas Kennedy	Democratic	January 15, 1935	January 17, 1939	George Howard Earle III	Democratic
17		Samuel S. Lewis	Republican	January 17, 1939	January 19, 1943	Arthur James	Republican
18		John C. Bell Jr.	Republican	January 20, 1943	January 2, 1947	Edward Martin	Republican
19		Daniel Strickler	Republican	January 21, 1947	January 16, 1951	James H. Duff	Republican
20		Lloyd H. Wood	Republican	January 16, 1951	January 18, 1955	John S. Fine	Republican
21		Roy E. Furman	Democratic	January 18, 1955	January 20, 1959	George M. Leader	Democratic
22		John Morgan Davis	Democratic	January 20, 1959	January 15, 1963	David L. Lawrence	Democratic
23		Raymond P. Shafer	Republican	January 15, 1963	January 17, 1967	William Scranton	Republican
24		Raymond J. Broderick	Republican	January 17, 1967	January 19, 1971	Raymond P. Shafer	Republican
25		Ernest Kline	Democratic	January 19, 1971	January 16, 1979	Milton Shapp	Democratic
26		William Scranton III	Republican	January 16, 1979	January 20, 1987	Dick Thornburgh	Republican
27		Mark Singel	Democratic	January 20, 1987	January 17, 1995	Bob Casey Sr.	Democratic
28		Mark Schweiker	Republican	January 17, 1995	October 5, 2001	Tom Ridge	Republican
29		Robert Jubelirer	Republican	October 5, 2001	January 21, 2003	Mark Schweiker	Republican
30		Catherine Baker Knoll	Democratic	January 21, 2003	November 12, 2008	Ed Rendell	Democratic
31		Joe Scarnati	Republican	December 3, 2008	January 18, 2011	Ed Rendell	Democratic
32		Jim Cawley	Republican	January 18, 2011	January 20, 2015	Tom Corbett	Republican
33		Mike Stack	Democratic	January 20, 2015	January 15, 2019	Tom Wolf	Democratic
34		John Fetterman	Democratic	January 15, 2019	January 3, 2023	Tom Wolf	Democratic
35		Austin Davis	Democratic	January 17, 2023	Incumbent	Josh Shapiro	Democratic

=== List of acting lieutenant governors ===
- Jake Corman – From May 17, 2022, to May 23, 2022, Corman served as acting lieutenant governor while lieutenant governor John Fetterman had a pacemaker implanted and recovered.
- Kim Ward – John Fetterman resigned as lieutenant governor to serve in the United States Senate on January 3, 2023, Ward served as acting lieutenant governor until January 17, 2023, when lieutenant governor-elect Austin Davis was sworn in.

== Vice-presidents of Pennsylvania ==
From 1777 to 1790, the executive branch of Pennsylvania's state government was headed by a Supreme Executive Council consisting of a representative of each county and of the City of Philadelphia. The vice president of the Council—also known as the vice-president of Pennsylvania—held a position analogous to the modern office of lieutenant governor. Presidents and vice-presidents were elected to one-year terms and could serve up to three years—the full length of their regular term as counsellor. Ten men served as vice-president during the time of the Council's existence.

- George Bryan, 1777–1779
- Matthew Smith, 1779
- William Moore, 1779–1781
- James Potter, 1781–1782
- James Ewing, 1782–1784
- James Irvine, 1784–1785
- Charles Biddle, 1785–1787
- Peter Muhlenberg, 1787–1788
- David Redick, 1788
- George Ross, 1788–1790
