= William M. Singerly =

American newspaper publisher (1832-1898)

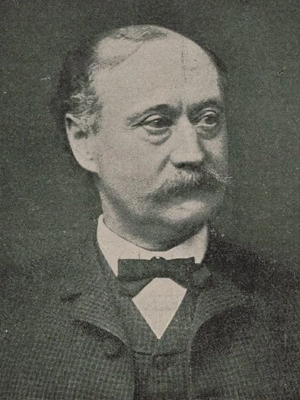
- Singerly c. 1898
- Born: December 27, 1832; Philadelphia, Pennsylvania, U.S.
- Died: February 27, 1898 (aged 65)
- Resting place: Laurel Hill Cemetery, Philadelphia, Pennsylvania, U.S.
- Occupations: Newspaper publisher, banker, real estate developer

William Miskey Singerly (December 27, 1832 – February 27, 1898) was an American businessman and publisher of The Philadelphia Record newspaper.

== Early life and education ==
Singerly was born in Philadelphia on December 27, 1832. His father Joseph Singerly was instrumental in the creation of the city's street car system. Singerly graduated from high school in 1850.

== Career ==
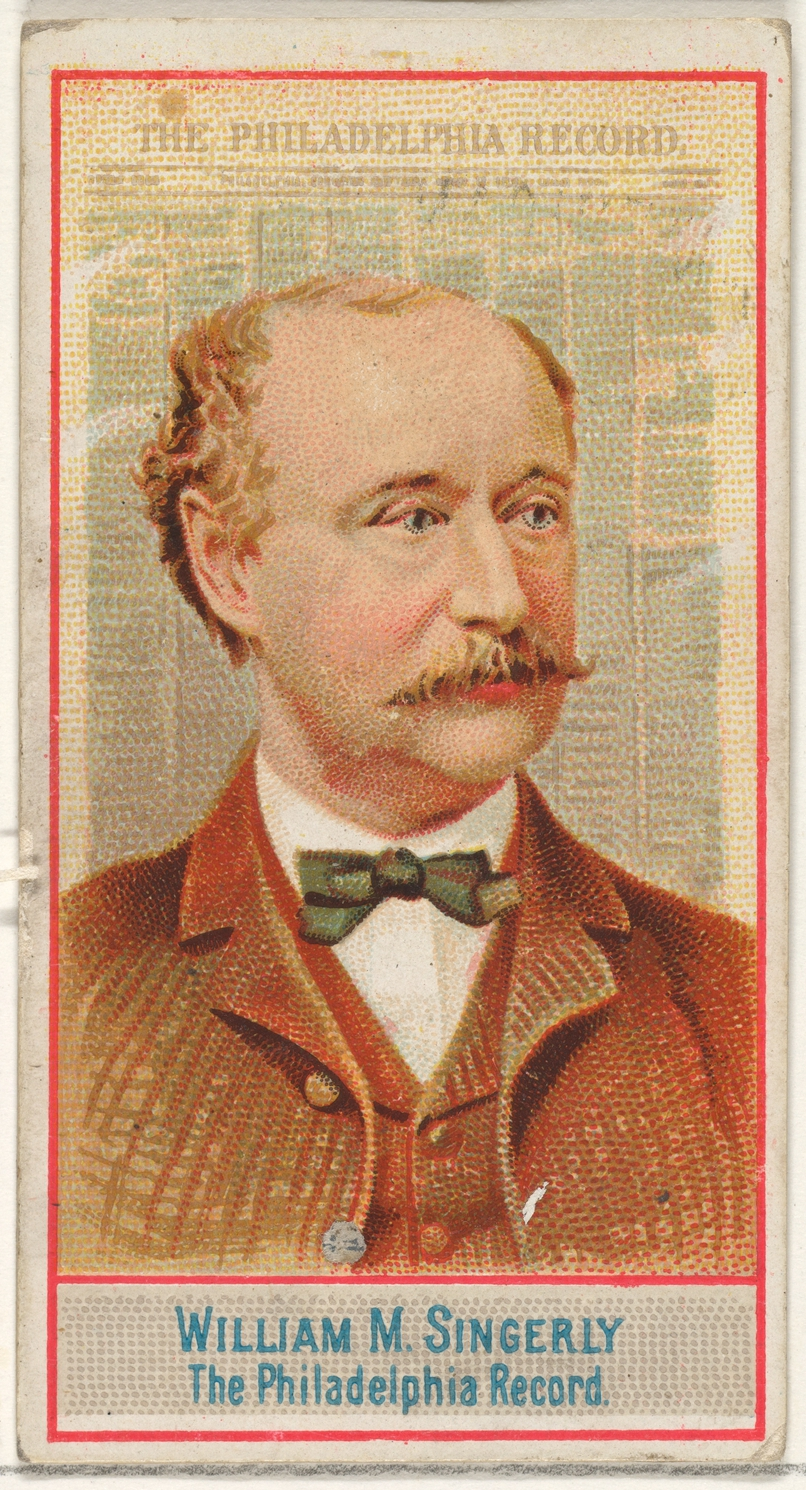
Allen & Ginter cigarette card from 1887 featuring Singerly

He worked for the J. Palmer & Company commission merchant company for ten years and founded a commission merchant business in Chicago, Illinois. He returned to Pennsylvania and worked for the Germantown Passenger Railway company and inherited stock worth $750,000 when his father died.

On June 1, 1877, Singerly purchased The Philadelphia Record newspaper from William J. Swain, the son of William Moseley Swain. It was a small newspaper with a circulation of only about 5,000 daily. He transformed it into a popular one-cent newspaper with a daily circulation of approximately 163,000.

In 1887, he established the Chestnut Street Bank and served as president. He was also president of the Chestnut Street Trust and Savings Fund Company. He had investments in the Brighton Knitting Mills in Philadelphia, a factory in Norristown, Pennsylvania, and a paper-mill in Fair Hills, Maryland. He was involved in real estate development in Northwest Philadelphia and oversaw the construction of over 1,000 new homes and businesses. His wealth was estimated to fluctuate between $5 and $10 million at various times in his life.

A staunch Democrat, he ran for Pennsylvania governor in 1894 but was defeated by Daniel H. Hastings.

== Horse racing and livestock breeding ==
Singerly bred and raced Standardbred and Thoroughbred horses. His best known was Morello who won the 1892 Coney Island Futurity Stakes at Sheepshead Bay Race Track, the then richest and most important event in Thoroughbred racing. Morello raced under the name of Singerly's nom de course Elkton Stable as well as his trainer Frank Van Ness. The colt would earn both American Co-Champion Two-Year-Old Male Horse and Three-Year-Old Co-Champion honors.

He owned a 600-acre farm in Gwynedd, Pennsylvania, where he raised Holstein cattle and Cotswold sheep. In 1879, Singerly joined the Association of Breeders of Thoroughbred Holstein Cattle. He also owned Elkton Stock Farm, a 300-acre farm outside Elkton, Maryland, which he used to breed and race standard-bred and thoroughbred horses. When he purchased the Elkton Stock Farm, he had 14 "high blooded young stock" in Lexington, Kentucky, which he desired to have trained near Philadelphia.

== Financial reversals and death ==
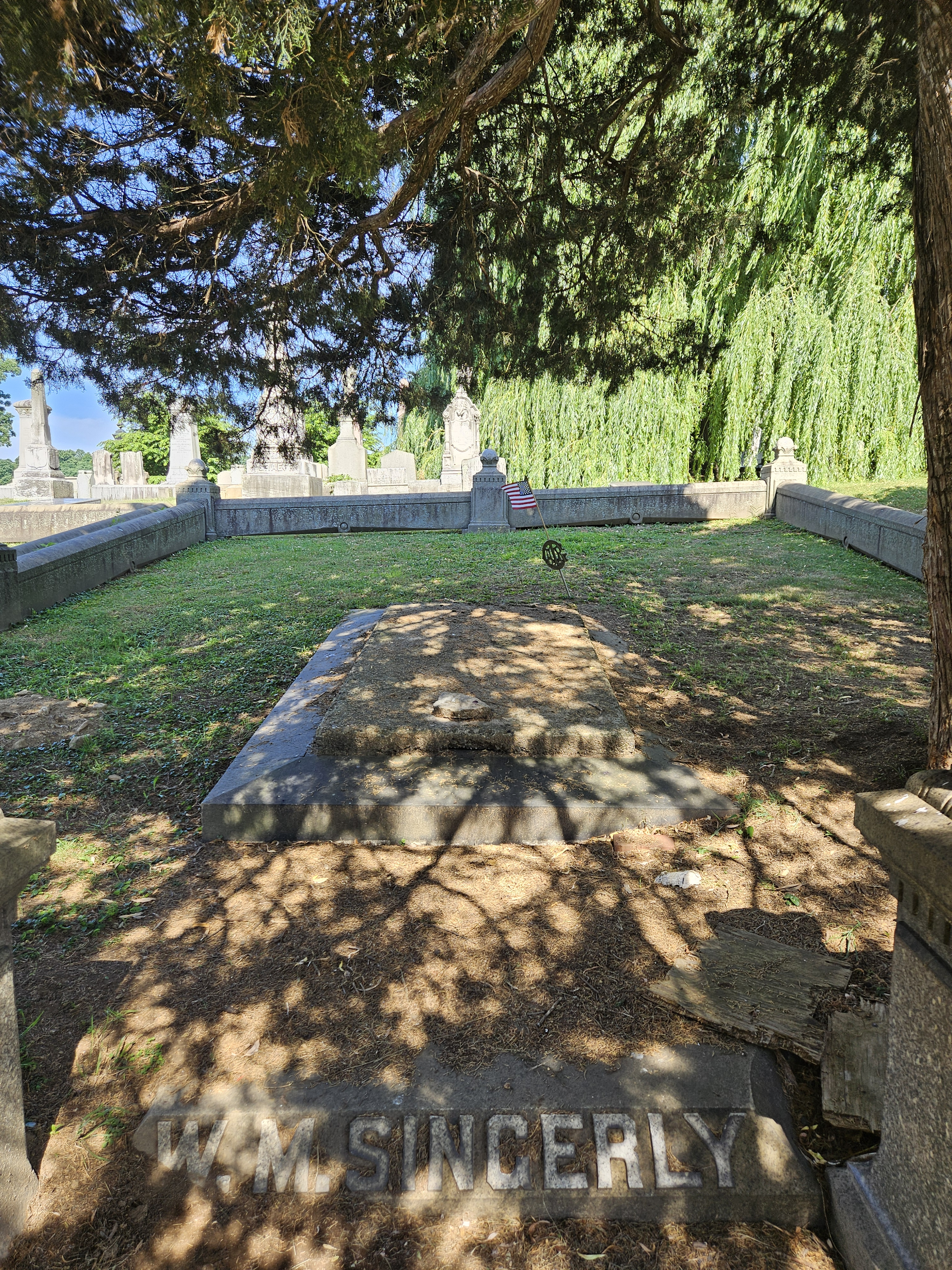
William M. Singerly Grave in Laurel Hill Cemetery

He suffered significant financial difficulties including the failure of the Chestnut Street National Bank in December 1897. He died on February 27, 1898, of heart disease and was interred in Laurel Hill Cemetery in Philadelphia.

== Legacy ==
The Singerly Fire Company in Elkton, Maryland, is named in his honor due to his $100 donation in the 1890s. The Singerly Fire Company today has three stations (Station 3, Station 13, Station 14), serves 89 square miles, and responds to over 6000 service calls annually.
