= William H. Blair =

William H. Blair (July 16, 1821 – December 7, 1888) was a Union Army captain and company commander in the 51st Pennsylvania Volunteer Infantry Regiment, and a colonel and commander of the 179th Pennsylvania Volunteer Infantry Regiment during the American Civil War. After his service, he was appointed to the grade of brevet brigadier general in recognition of his service at the Battle of Antietam.

== Early life ==
William H. Blair was born in Milesburg, Pennsylvania, on July 16, 1821. He attended Allegheny College. He was a lawyer and newspaper editor.

== American Civil War ==
William H. Blair began his Union Army service as a first lieutenant in the 4th Pennsylvania Infantry Regiment, a 90-day regiment, on April 19, 1861. He was mustered out of the volunteers with the regiment on July 27, 1861. On October 4, 1861, Blair was appointed 1st lieutenant of the 51st Pennsylvania Volunteer Infantry Regiment. He was promoted to captain on February 12, 1862. On December 8, 1862, he was appointed colonel of the 179th Pennsylvania Volunteer Infantry Regiment. He was mustered out of the volunteers on July 27, 1863.

On May 31, 1866, President Andrew Johnson nominated Blair for appointment to the grade of brevet brigadier general of volunteers, to rank from March 13, 1865, for his service at the Battle of Antietam, and the United States Senate confirmed the appointment on July 23, 1866.

== Death ==
William H. Blair died on December 7, 1888, in Bellefonte, Pennsylvania. He was buried at the Union Cemetery in Bellefonte.

== See also ==
- List of American Civil War brevet generals (Union)
