= 1902 Pennsylvania gubernatorial election =

- November 4, 1902
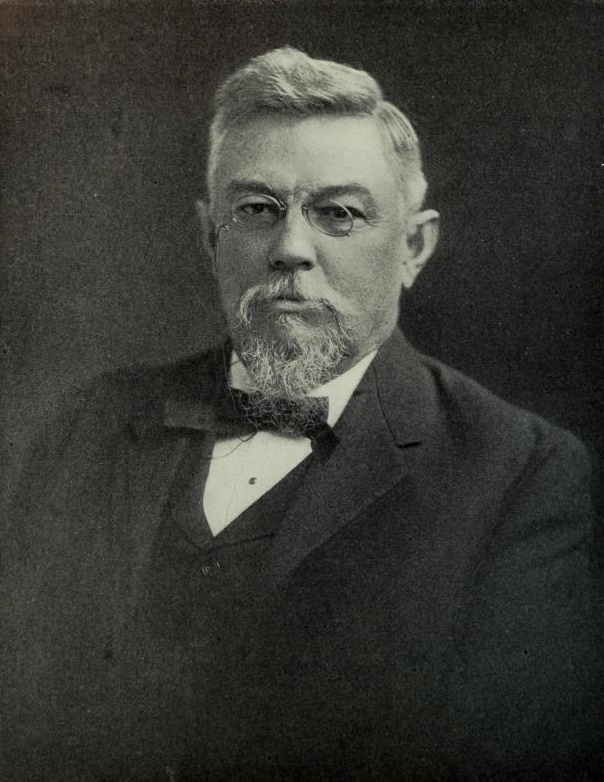

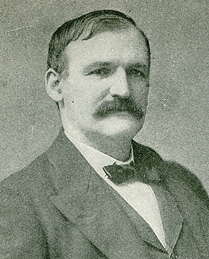
Nominee	Samuel W. Pennypacker	Robert E. Pattison
Party	Republican	Democratic
Popular vote	593,328	450,978
Percentage	54.20%	41.19%
- County results Pennypacker: 40–50% 50–60% 60–70% Pattison: 40–50% 50–60% 60–70% 70–80%
Governor before election
William A. Stone
Republican
Elected Governor
Samuel W. Pennypacker
Republican

The 1902 Pennsylvania gubernatorial election occurred on November 4, 1902. Republican candidate Samuel W. Pennypacker defeated Democratic candidate and former Governor Robert E. Pattison to become Governor of Pennsylvania. James Kerr and George W. Guthrie unsuccessfully sought the Democratic nomination.

== Results ==
Pennsylvania gubernatorial election, 1902
Party	Candidate	Votes	%
Republican	Samuel W. Pennypacker	593,328	54.20
Democratic	Robert E. Pattison	450,978	41.19
Prohibition	Silas C. Swallow	23,327	2.13
Socialist	John W. Slayton	21,910	2.00
Socialist Labor	William Adams	5,155	0.47
Independent	John P. Elkin	15	0.00
N/A	Other	58	0.01
Total votes		1,094,771	100.00
