= 1886 Pennsylvania gubernatorial election =

- November 2, 1886
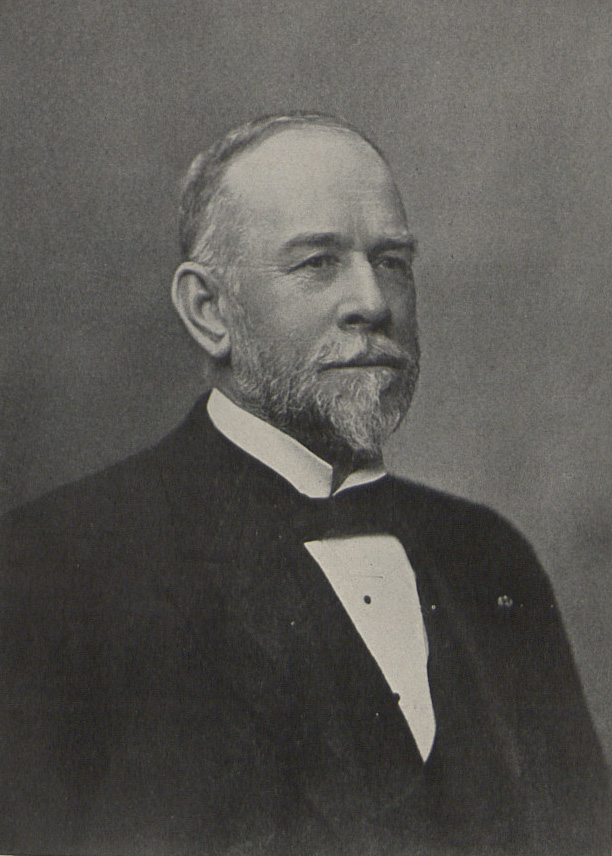

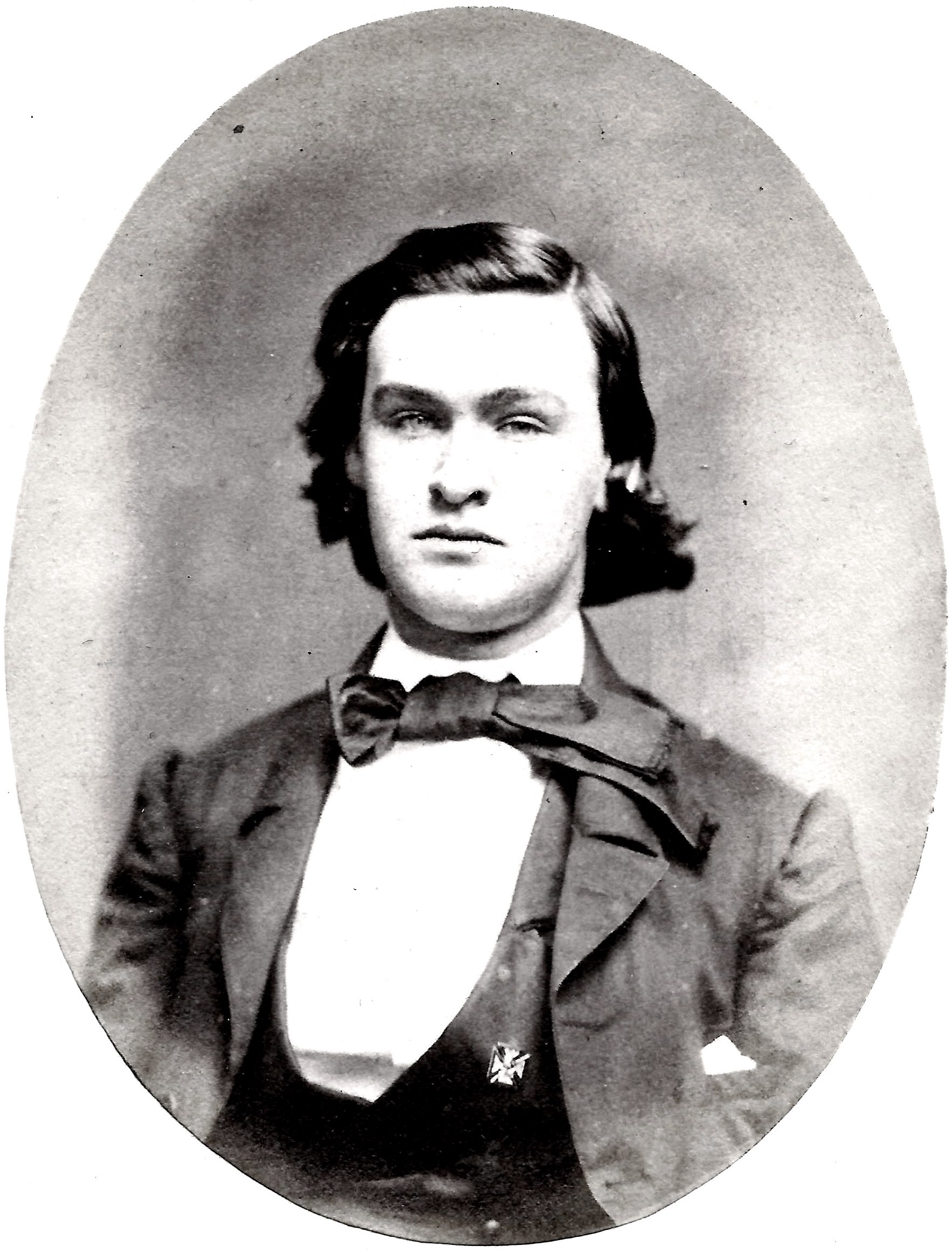
Nominee	James A. Beaver	Chauncey Forward Black
Party	Republican	Democratic
Popular vote	412,285	369,634
Percentage	50.33%	45.12%
- County results Beaver: 40–50% 50–60% 60–70% Black: 40–50% 50–60% 60–70% 70–80%
Governor before election
Robert E. Pattison
Democratic
Elected Governor
James A. Beaver
Republican

The 1886 Pennsylvania gubernatorial election occurred on November 2, 1886. Republican candidate James A. Beaver defeated Democratic candidate Chauncey Forward Black to become Governor of Pennsylvania. William A. Wallace unsuccessfully sought the Democratic nomination.

== Results ==
Pennsylvania gubernatorial election, 1886
Party	Candidate	Votes	%
Republican	James A. Beaver	412,285	50.33
Democratic	Chauncey Forward Black	369,634	45.12
Prohibition	Charles S. Wolf	32,458	3.96
Greenback	Robert J. Houston	4,835	0.59
N/A	Other	1	0.00
Total votes		819,213	100.00
