= Charles W. Thomas (politician) =

American politician (1860–1907)

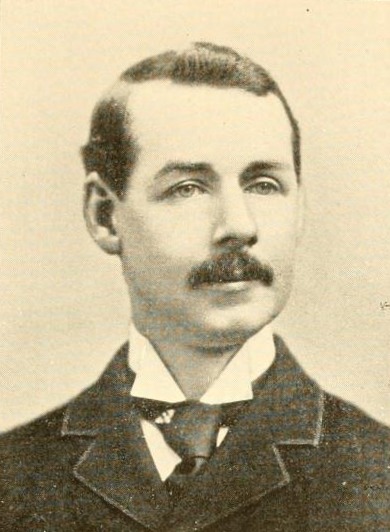
- Thomas in a 1895 publication

Member of the Pennsylvania Senate from the 4th district
- In office 1890 – March 19, 1898
- Preceded by: John J. MacFarlane
- Succeeded by: J. Bayard Henry

Member of the Pennsylvania House of Representatives from the Philadelphia County district
- In office 1885 – December 1, 1889

Personal details
- Born: Charles Wesley Thomas; June 6, 1860 Philadelphia, Pennsylvania, U.S.
- Died: June 14, 1907 (aged 47) Linwood, New Jersey, U.S.
- Resting place: West Laurel Hill Cemetery; Bala Cynwyd, Pennsylvania, U.S.
- Party: Republican
- Spouse: Mattie R. Conard (m. 1886)
- Occupation: Politician; clerk; real estate

Charles Wesley Thomas (June 6, 1860 – June 14, 1907) was an American politician from Pennsylvania. He served as a member of the Pennsylvania House of Representatives from 1885 to 1889 and as a member of the Pennsylvania Senate from 1890 to 1898. He was president pro tempore of the senate from 1893 to 1896.

== Early life ==
Charles Wesley Thomas was born on June 6, 1860, to Martha A. and Benjamin Thomas in Philadelphia. His father was a grocer. He attended public schools in Philadelphia.

== Career ==
Thomas worked in a grocery store. He then became an accounting clerk at the general office of the Pennsylvania Railroad at South 4th Street. For a time, he worked in real estate.

Thomas was a Republican. He served as a member of the Pennsylvania House of Representatives, representing Philadelphia County from 1885 to 1889. He resigned on December 1, 1889, to work as the private secretary to Thomas Valentine Cooper, the collector of the Port of Philadelphia from 1889 to 1890. He was elected to the Pennsylvania Senate, representing the 4th district, in 1890, defeating John S. Golback. He succeeded John J. MacFarlane. He was re-elected in 1894 and served until his resignation on March 19, 1898. In 1893, he was elected president pro tempore of the senate and was re-elected in 1895. He served in the role until 1896. He was chairman of the corporations committee in the senate. He was a leader of the movement for abolition of the Public Building Commission of Philadelphia. He was assistant secretary of the Republican State Committee in 1887 and secretary in charge of the committee in 1888. He was a delegate to the Republican State Convention in 1888 and 1892.

Thomas was appointed to succeed Thomas Valentine Cooper as collector of customs of the United States Customs Service in Philadelphia. He served from 1898 to 1907. In 1906, he helped Philadelphia's port get an A-1 rating for "instituting reform programs and cost efficiency systems".

== Personal life ==
Thomas married Mattie R. Conard in 1886.

Thomas died of a heart attack on June 14, 1907, at his summer home in Linwood, New Jersey. He was interred in West Laurel Hill Cemetery in Bala Cynwyd, Pennsylvania.
