= Chauncey Forward Black =

American politician (1839–1904)

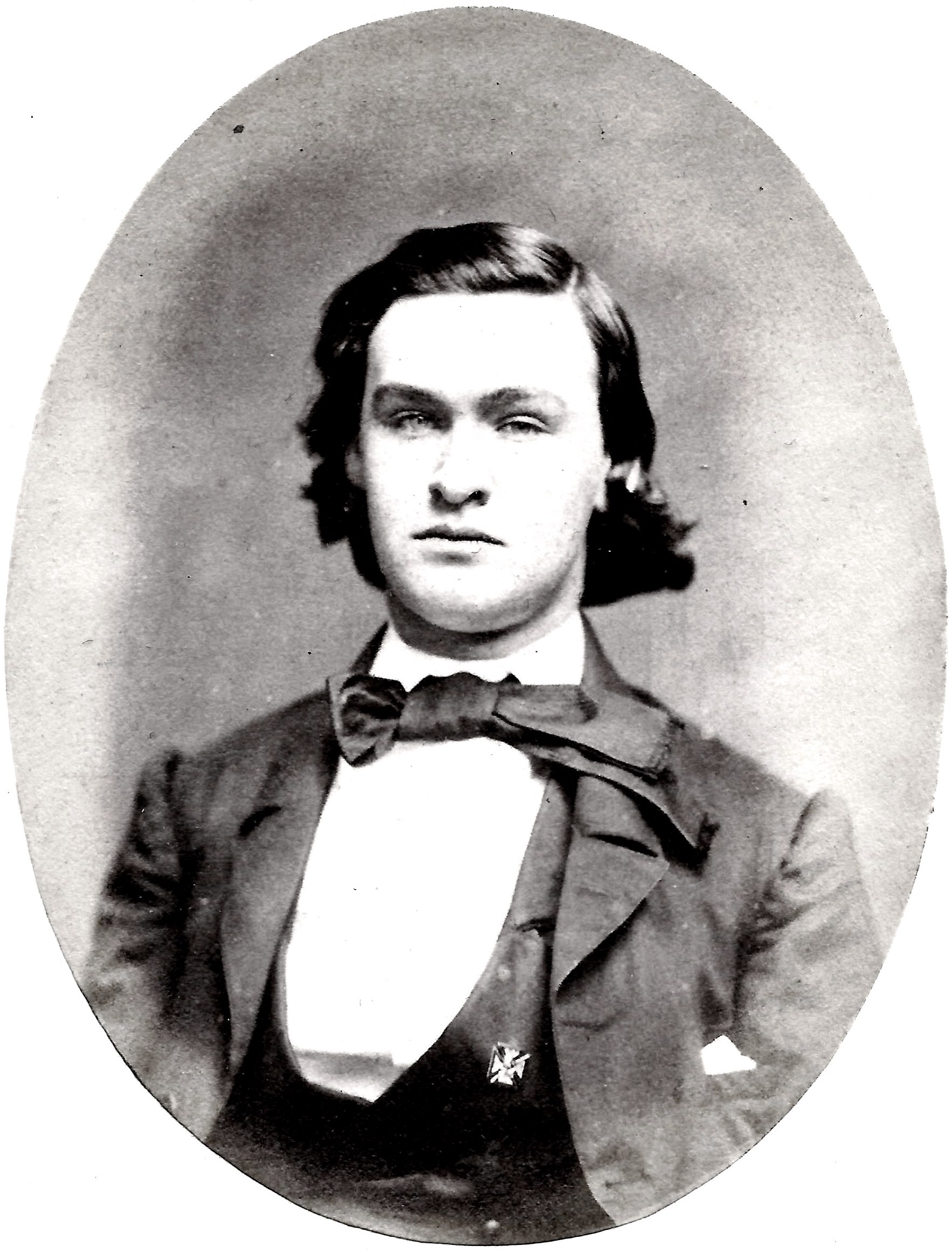
- Black in 1859

3rd Lieutenant Governor of Pennsylvania
- In office January 16, 1883 – January 12, 1887
- Governor: Robert E. Pattison
- Preceded by: Charles W. Stone
- Succeeded by: William T. Davies

Personal details
- Born: Chauncey Forward Black; November 24, 1839 York, Pennsylvania, U.S.
- Died: December 2, 1904 (aged 65) York, Pennsylvania, U.S.
- Resting place: Prospect Hill Cemetery, York, Pennsylvania, U.S.
- Spouse: Mary Clarke Dawson Black
- Children: 4
- Parent(s): Jeremiah Sullivan Black; Mary Forward Black

Chauncey Forward Black (November 24, 1839 – December 2, 1904) was the third lieutenant governor of Pennsylvania from 1883 to 1887. He was an unsuccessful candidate for Governor of Pennsylvania in 1886.

== Biography ==
Born in Glades, Pennsylvania on November 24, 1839, he was the son of justice for the Supreme Court of Pennsylvania, U.S. Attorney General and U.S. Secretary of State Jeremiah S. Black and Mary (Forward) Black, and the grandson of Representative Henry Black and Mary (Sullivan) Black. His maternal grandfather was Representative Chauncey Forward. He married Mary Clarke Dawson and they had four children.

Black was educated at Hiram College, where he met and developed a close personal friendship with future president James Garfield. He later attended Washington & Jefferson College. Black entered the field of journalism, where he wrote primarily for The New York Sun. Black was also an author best known for ghostwriting a biography of Abraham Lincoln for his bodyguard Ward Hill Lamon titled The Life of Abraham Lincoln; from his Birth to his Inauguration as President published in 1872. Because of his reformist zeal, Black was chosen to run on the ticket of Robert E. Pattison in 1882. He served as Lieutenant Governor of Pennsylvania from 1883 to 1887 and ran unsuccessfully for governor in 1886.

Chauncey Forward Black died in York, Pennsylvania, on December 2, 1904, at the age of 65. He was buried in Prospect Hill Cemetery, York, Pennsylvania.

Party political offices
Preceded by John Fertig	Democratic nominee for Lieutenant Governor of Pennsylvania; 1882	Succeeded by R. Bruce Ricketts
Preceded by Robert E. Pattison	Democratic nominee for Governor of Pennsylvania; 1886	Succeeded by Robert E. Pattison
Preceded by R. Bruce Ricketts	Democratic nominee for Lieutenant Governor of Pennsylvania; 1890	Succeeded by John S. Rilling
Political offices
Preceded by Charles W. Stone	Lieutenant Governor of Pennsylvania; 1883–1887	Succeeded by William T. Davies
