= 1882 Pennsylvania gubernatorial election =

- November 7, 1882
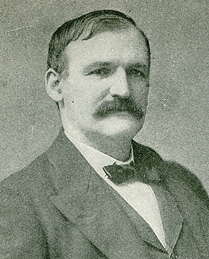

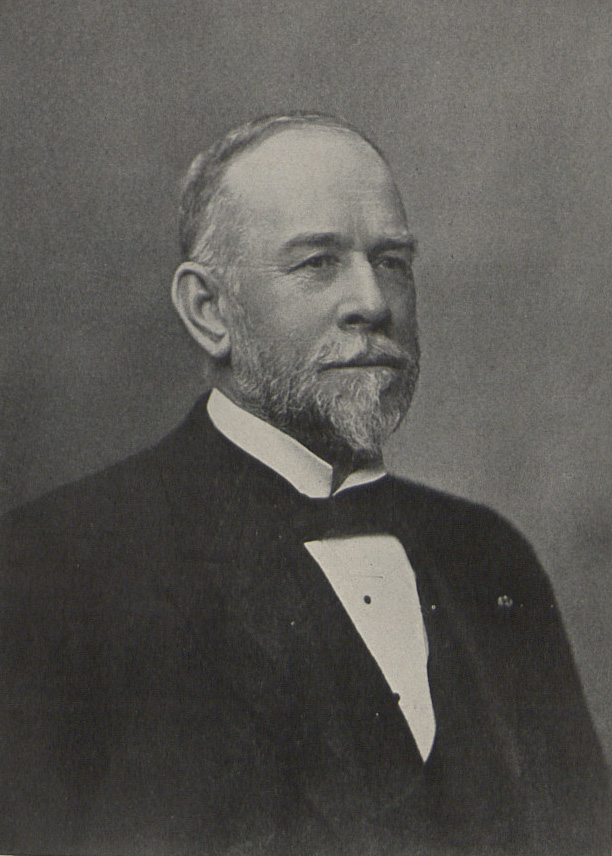

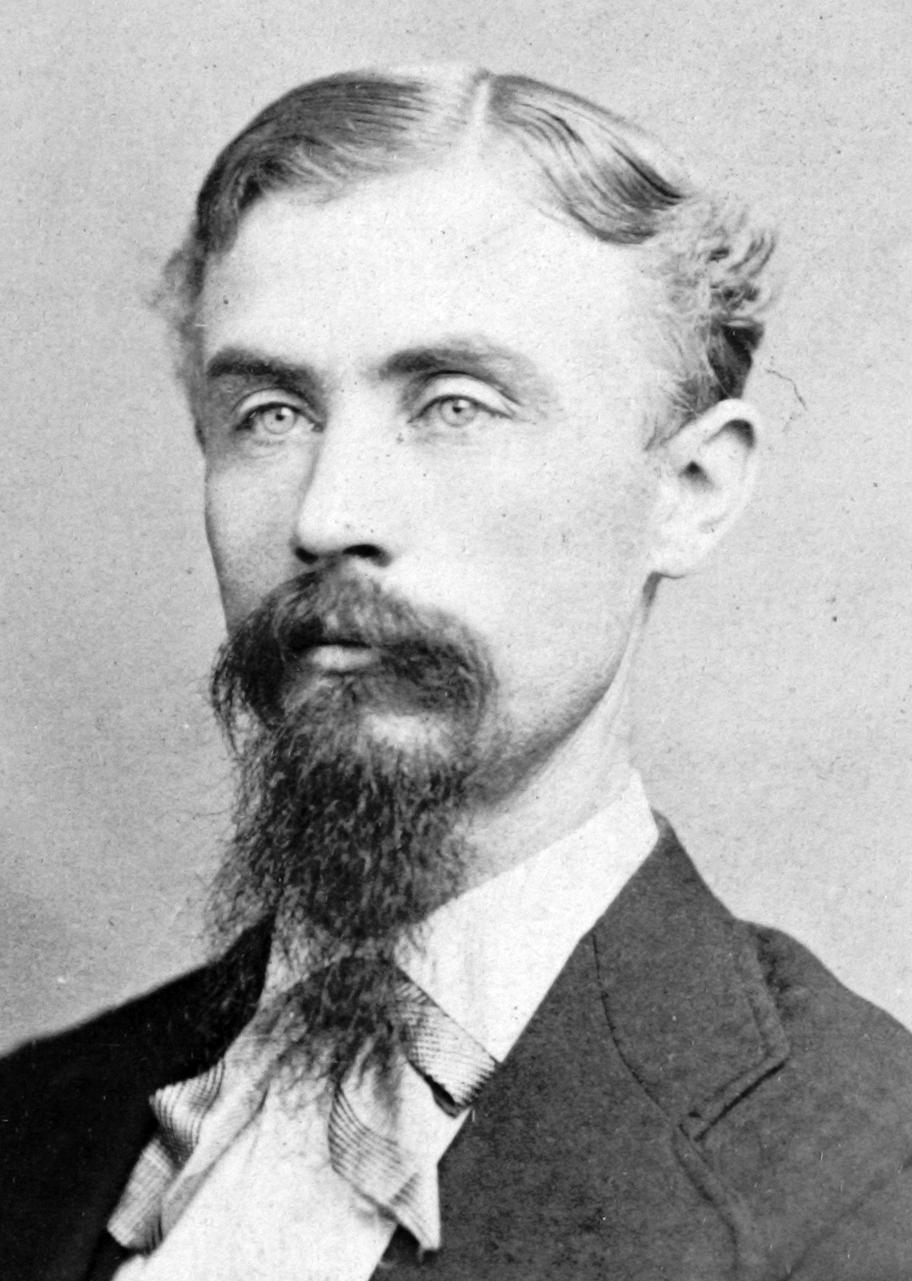
Nominee	Robert E. Pattison	James A. Beaver	John Stewart
Party	Democratic	Republican	Independent Republican
Popular vote	355,791	315,589	43,743
Percentage	47.83%	42.43%	5.88%
- County Results Pattison: 30–40% 40–50% 50–60% 60–70% 70–80% 80–90% Beaver: 20–30% 30–40% 40–50% 50–60%
Governor before election
Henry M. Hoyt
Republican
Elected Governor
Robert E. Pattison
Democratic

The 1882 Pennsylvania gubernatorial election occurred on November 7, 1882. Incumbent governor Henry M. Hoyt, a Republican, was not a candidate for re-election.

Democratic candidate Robert E. Pattison defeated Republican candidate James A. Beaver to become Governor of Pennsylvania. James Herron Hopkins, Simon Peter Wolverton, and William Watts Hart Davis unsuccessfully sought the Democratic nomination.

== Results ==
Pennsylvania gubernatorial election, 1882
Party	Candidate	Votes	%
Democratic	Robert E. Pattison	355,791	47.83
Republican	James A. Beaver	315,589	42.43
Independent Republican	John Stewart	43,743	5.88
Greenback	Thomas A. Armstrong	23,484	3.16
Prohibition	Alfred C. Petit	5,196	0.70
N/A	Other	1	0.00
Total votes		743,804	100.00
