= James A. Beaver =

American politician (1837–1914)

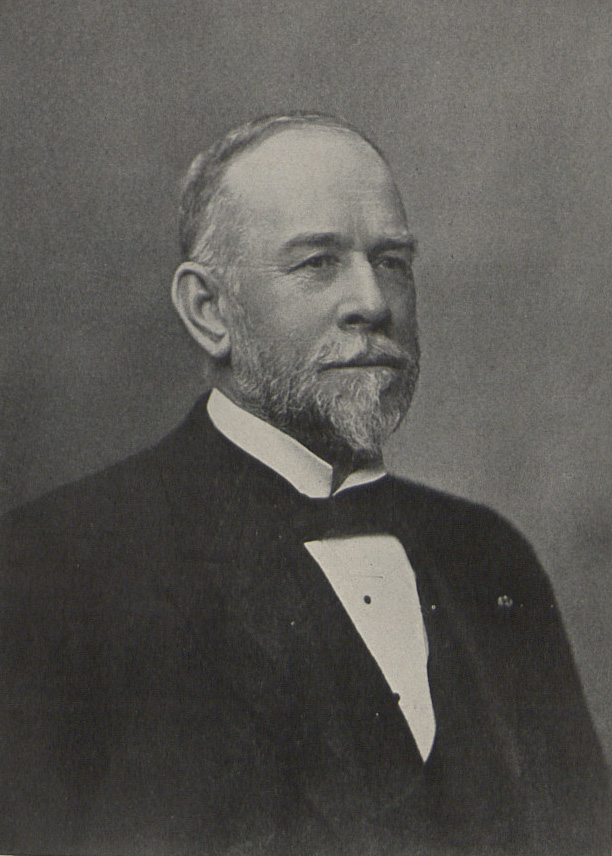
- Beaver pictured in La Vie 1908, Penn State yearbook

20th Governor of Pennsylvania
- In office January 18, 1887 – January 20, 1891
- Lieutenant: William T. Davies
- Preceded by: Robert E. Pattison
- Succeeded by: Robert E. Pattison

President of the Pennsylvania State University Acting
- In office 1906–1908
- Preceded by: George W. Atherton
- Succeeded by: Edwin Erle Sparks

Personal details
- Born: October 21, 1837 Millerstown, Pennsylvania
- Died: January 31, 1914 (aged 76) Bellefonte, Pennsylvania
- Party: Republican
- Spouse: Mary McAllister
- Children: 5
- Occupation: Politician; lawyer; academic; military officer

James Addams Beaver (October 21, 1837 – January 31, 1914) was an American attorney, recruiter and field commander of Pennsylvania Infantry who was wounded four times during the American Civil War, and politician who served as the 20th governor of Pennsylvania from 1887 to 1891. He also served as the acting president of the Pennsylvania State University from 1906 to 1908.

== Early life and education ==
Born in Millerstown, Pennsylvania, James was educated by his mother (his father having died in 1840) until 1846, when the family removed to Belleville, and he was sent to school. In 1852 he entered Pine Grove Academy, and in 1854 joined the junior class in Jefferson College. Beaver graduated from Jefferson College in Canonsburg, Pennsylvania (now Washington & Jefferson College), in 1856.

After graduation, he read law in the office of H.N. McAllister, at Bellefonte, Pennsylvania, and was taken into partnership by him almost as soon as he was of age. During this period of his life, he joined a local military company — the "Bellefonte Fencibles," under Capt. Andrew G. Curtin, afterward war governor of Pennsylvania. He made a thorough study of tactics, and, when President Abraham Lincoln called for volunteers to suppress the rebellion in 1861, he was second lieutenant of the company which promptly marched for the defence of the national capital.

== Military service ==
On the organization of the 45th Pennsylvania volunteers, he became its lieutenant-colonel, and first saw active service in the neighborhood of Hilton Head and Port Royal, South Carolina. A new call for volunteers was issued in 1862 and Lieut-Col. Beaver was commissioned colonel of the 148th Pennsylvania volunteers, recruited in the vicinity of his home. He had by this time developed high qualities as a disciplinarian, and his men made it their boast that they were often mistaken for regulars. The regiment joined the army of the Potomac just after the Battle of Fredericksburg, was assigned to Hancock's corps, and first met the enemy at the Battle of Chancellorsville (2 and 3 May 1863), where it held an advanced position, and lost very heavily, Col. Beaver being among the wounded.

He had not recovered when the third call for troops was issued; but, at his own request, he was placed on recruiting service, in command of Camp Curtin. He was able to rejoin his regiment just before the Battle of Gettysburg, but, still weak from his wound, was not permitted to take command during the fight. He led his regiment throughout the Wilderness Campaign in May 1864, and took part in the successful assault upon the confederate works at Spottsylvania Court House, his regiment being among the first to scale the earthworks. At the Battle of Cold Harbor (3 June 1864) he was left in command of the brigade, Gen. Brooke being wounded, and later he was himself slightly wounded, but not disabled, and remained at his post during the rest of the day, holding an advanced position close to the enemy's works, and constantly under fire.

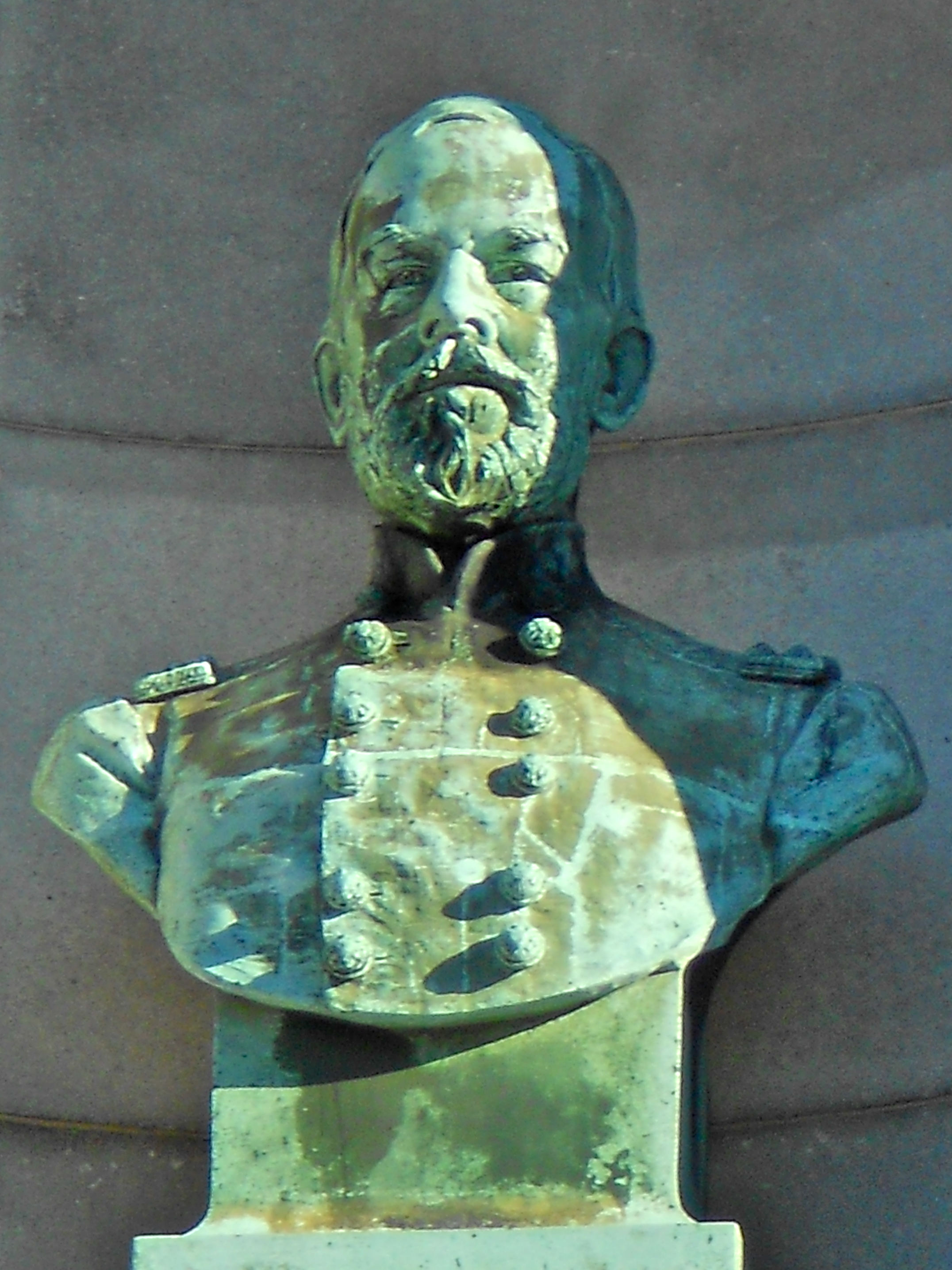
Bust of Beaver on Smith Memorial Arch

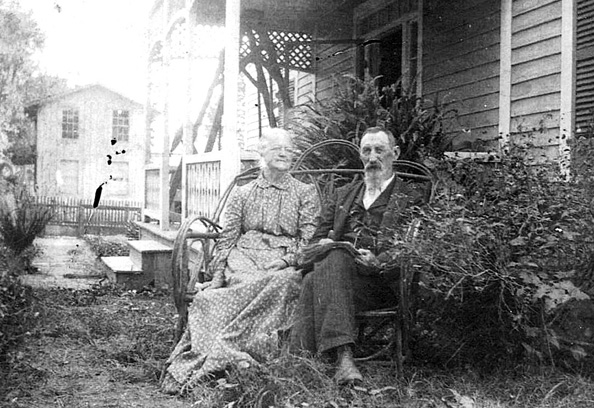
Beaver with his wife Mary McAllister

On 16 June 1864, he was again wounded while leading his brigade in the first assault upon the works at Petersburg. Returning to duty before his wound was fairly healed, he rode to the battlefield of Ream's Station in an ambulance, and had scarcely reached the front and assumed command at the advanced line when his right leg was shattered by a rifle ball. Amputation of the right leg followed, and, although his life was saved, the 26-year-old was no longer capable of active military service. He was brevetted brigadier general of volunteers, 10 November 1864, and mustered out of service at his own request on 22 December of that year, refusing to remain in the army on light duty as he was urged to do. He repeatedly declined promotion that would have taken him away from his own regiment, feeling bound to remain with the men whom he had enlisted.

== Political career and later life ==
Following the war, Beaver pursued his law career. He was elected a member of the board of trustees of the Pennsylvania State College in 1873, and took active part as a speaker in the campaigns of the Republican Party. He declined offers to run for public office until 1881 (including a spot as vice president on James Garfield's Republican ticket). He lost to Robert Pattison, but, because the new state constitution of 1874 prohibited governors from serving multiple consecutive terms, Beaver ran again and served as governor for the four years between Pattison's two non-consecutive terms. In 1895, he was appointed as one of the judges of the first state Superior Court, an office he held until his death in 1914. He was buried in Union Cemetery in Bellefonte. He was a prominent member of the Grand Army of the Republic.

Beaver Stadium and Beaver Hall, located on the University Park campus of Pennsylvania State University, as well as Beaver Avenue in State College are all named in his honor.

Party political offices
Preceded by Henry M. Hoyt	Republican nominee for Governor of Pennsylvania; 1882, 1886	Succeeded by George Delamater
Political offices
Preceded by Robert E. Pattison	Governor of Pennsylvania; January 18, 1887 – January 20, 1891	Succeeded by Robert E. Pattison
Academic offices
Preceded by George W. Atherton	Pennsylvania State University President; Interregnum; 1906–1908	Succeeded by Edwin Erle Sparks
