= Robert E. Pattison =

American politician (1850–1904)

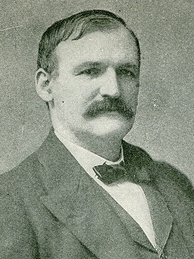

19th Governor of Pennsylvania
- In office January 20, 1891 – January 15, 1895
- Lieutenant: Louis A. Watres
- Preceded by: James A. Beaver
- Succeeded by: Daniel H. Hastings
- In office January 16, 1883 – January 18, 1887
- Lieutenant: Chauncey F. Black
- Preceded by: Henry M. Hoyt
- Succeeded by: James A. Beaver

Personal details
- Born: Robert Emory Pattison; December 8, 1850 Quantico, Maryland, U.S.
- Died: August 1, 1904 (aged 53) Philadelphia, Pennsylvania, U.S.
- Party: Democratic

Robert Emory Pattison (December 8, 1850 – August 1, 1904) was an American attorney and politician who served as the 19th governor of Pennsylvania from 1883 to 1887 and 1891 to 1895. Pattison was the only Democratic Governor of Pennsylvania between the start of the American Civil War and the start of the Great Depression.

== Life and career ==
Robert E. Pattison was born at Quantico in Somerset County, Maryland, on December 8, 1850. His family had been in Dorchester County, Maryland, for three generations. His parents were Robert Henry Pattison, a Methodist Episcopalian minister, and Catherine Woolford. He moved with his family to Philadelphia when he was five and was educated in the public schools, graduating from the high school of that city as the valedictorian of his class. He practiced law from 1872 to 1877 and was elected Controller of the city of Philadelphia in 1880. He was the Democratic candidate for governor at the young age of 32, and, with little experience in public office, took the governor's office back from a succession of Republican administrations. Under the constitution of 1874, Pennsylvania governors, now serving a 4-year term, were prevented from seeking two consecutive terms. Pattison's opponent in the 1882 election, James Addams Beaver, held the post for a term before Pattison sought the office once again in 1890. During his second term, he ordered state militia to halt the Homestead Strike.

A key to Pattison's success was his close relationship with the Democratic leader of Philadelphia, attorney Lewis Cassidy. He studied law under Cassidy, and was admitted to the bar at the age of 21. Although he campaigned as an anti-political machine reformer, he appointed Cassidy as Attorney General of Pennsylvania. He did constant battle with machine interests, and in his second term enacted legislation providing for a secret ballot for voters in all elections.

A number of other reforms were carried out under Pattison.

Pattison's feat of being elected to a state governorship at the age of 31 was matched in the 20th century only by Harold Stassen, elected governor of Minnesota in 1938. Bill Clinton was elected Governor of Arkansas at the age of 32.

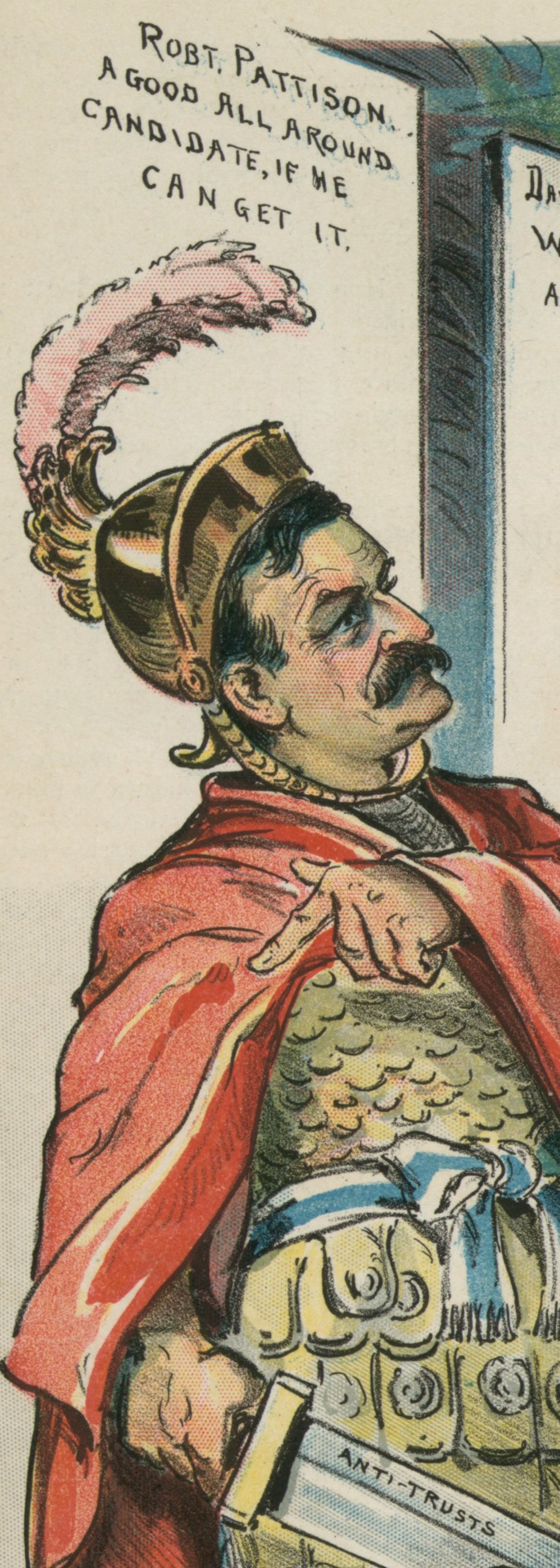
Robert E. Pattison in a Puck magazine cartoon about potential Presidential candidates

Pattison's success at a young age led him to be promoted for other offices. He was the unsuccessful Democratic nominee for Mayor of Philadelphia in 1895, an unsuccessful candidate for the Democratic Presidential nomination at the Democratic National Convention in 1896, and an unsuccessful Democratic gubernatorial nominee for a third term as governor in 1902.

Pattison was an elected member of the American Philosophical Society.

He died at his home in the Overbrook neighborhood of Philadelphia on August 1, 1904. The New York Times obituary of Pattison credited the stress of his final gubernatorial campaign against Samuel W. Pennypacker with leading to his death. He is buried at West Laurel Hill Cemetery in Bala Cynwyd, Pennsylvania.

== Legacy ==
Pattison Avenue in South Philadelphia is named after him. In the late 1970s, an award to a graduating senior at Central High School of Philadelphia was established in his honor. Pattison graduated from Central High School and was the valedictorian for his class.

Party political offices
Preceded by Andrew H. Dill	Democratic nominee for Governor of Pennsylvania; 1882	Succeeded by Chauncey Forward Black
Preceded by Chauncey Forward Black	Democratic nominee for Governor of Pennsylvania; 1890	Succeeded by William M. Singerly
Preceded by George A. Jenks	Democratic nominee for Governor of Pennsylvania; 1902	Succeeded by Lewis Emery Jr.
Political offices
Preceded by Henry M. Hoyt	Governor of Pennsylvania; 1883–1887	Succeeded by James A. Beaver
Preceded by James A. Beaver	Governor of Pennsylvania; 1891–1895	Succeeded by Daniel H. Hastings
