= 1838 Pennsylvania gubernatorial election =

- October 9, 1838
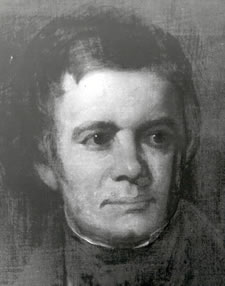

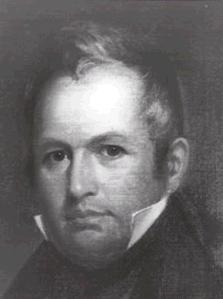
Nominee	David R. Porter	Joseph Ritner
Party	Democratic	Anti-Masonic
Popular vote	127,821	122,325
Percentage	51.10%	48.90%
- County Results; Porter: 50–60% 60–70% 70–80% 80–90% Ritner: 50–60% 60–70% 70–80%
Governor before election
Joseph Ritner
Anti-Masonic
Elected Governor
David R. Porter
Democratic

The 1838 Pennsylvania gubernatorial election was a statewide contest for the office of Governor of the Commonwealth of Pennsylvania in the United States.

Incumbent Governor Joseph Ritner, who was the last governor to serve under Pennsylvania's Constitution of 1790, ran as an Anti-Masonic candidate. He was defeated by Jacksonian Democrat David R. Porter by less than 5,500 votes, following a divisive campaign marred by rising public prejudice against Freemasonry and a disinformation campaign that distributed biographical booklets with inaccurate information about Porter.

Unhappy with the election's outcome, a group of Ritner supporters subsequently challenged the election results, sparking statewide violence that culminated in the Buckshot War.

== History ==
The last governor to serve under Pennsylvania's Constitution of 1790, incumbent Governor Joseph Ritner, ran for re-election as an Anti-Masonic candidate against Jacksonian Democrat David R. Porter, who as a member of the Huntingdon Lodge of the Freemasons, had risen to the levels of Grand Master of his lodge and Deputy Grand Master of the Masonic district in which his lodge was located.

The campaign was an unusually divisive one, fueled by disinformation about Porter that was spread by Ritner supporters, public prejudice against Freemasonry that had been increasing since the 1833 passage of a new state law which made it illegal for fraternal organizations to require their members to keep their rituals secret from the public, the rise of anti-abolitionist groups across Pennsylvania whose members were opposed to ending the practice of chattel slavery in America, and accusations of voter fraud. When Ritner was defeated by Porter by less than 5,500 results, supporters of Ritner challenged the election results, sparking statewide violence that culminated in the Buckshot War, which was finally ended by legislative action, enabling Porter to take office as the first governor under the State Constitution of 1838.

== Results ==
Pennsylvania gubernatorial election, 1838
Party	Candidate	Votes	%
Democratic	David R. Porter	127,821	51.10
Anti-Masonic	Joseph Ritner (incumbent)	122,325	48.90
Total votes		250,146	100.00

== See also ==
- Buckshot War
