= James Irvin (politician) =

American politician

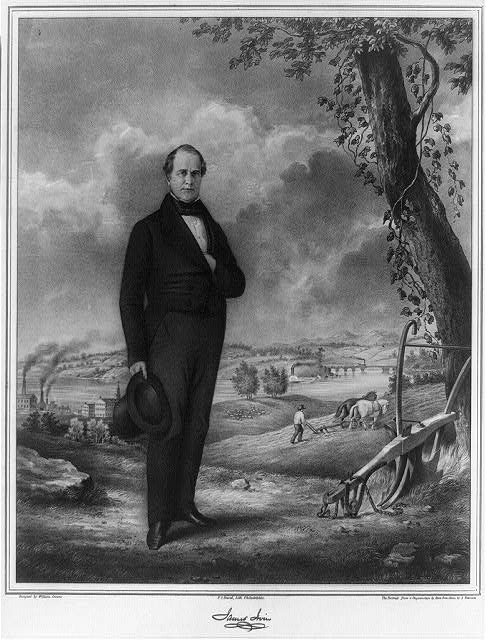
- An 1847 illustration of Irvin

Member of the U.S. House of Representatives from Pennsylvania
- In office March 4, 1841 – March 3, 1845
- Preceded by: George McCulloch (14th); Almon Heath Read (17th)
- Succeeded by: Alexander Ramsey (14th); John Blanchard (17th)
- Constituency: 14th district (1841-43); 17th district (1843-45)

Personal details
- Born: February 18, 1800 Centre County, Pennsylvania, U.S.
- Died: November 28, 1862 (aged 62) Centre County, Pennsylvania, U.S.
- Party: Whig

James Irvin (February 18, 1800 – November 28, 1862) was an American politician. Irvin was a prominent agriculturalist and ironmaster in Centre County, Pennsylvania. Irvin represented Pennsylvania's 14th congressional district in the 27th and 28th Congresses. Irvin unsuccessfully ran for governor of Pennsylvania in 1847, losing to incumbent governor Francis Rawn Shunk.

== Biography ==
In 1855, the General Assembly of the Commonwealth of Pennsylvania chartered the Farmer's High School. The school's trustees decided to build the school on 200 acres (0.81 km^{2}) of Centre County land donated by Irvin. That Farmer's High School is now Pennsylvania State University. Irvin Hall, one of Penn State's oldest residential halls, is named in his honor.

Irvin died from a case of Smallpox in Hecla, Centre County, Pennsylvania, on November 28, 1862. He is buried in Union Cemetery in Bellefonte, Pennsylvania.

The Oak Hall Historic District, associated with his dwelling in College Township, Pennsylvania, was added to the National Register of Historic Places in 1977. Also on the Register is the Monroe Furnace, which he established in 1849.

== Bibliography ==
- United States Congress. "James Irvin (id: I000033)". Biographical Directory of the United States Congress.

Party political offices
Preceded by Joseph Markle	Whig nominee for Governor of Pennsylvania; 1847	Succeeded by William F. Johnston
U.S. House of Representatives
Preceded by George McCulloch	Member of the U.S. House of Representatives from Pennsylvania's 14th congressional district 1841–1843	Succeeded by Alexander Ramsey
Preceded by Almon Heath Read	Member of the U.S. House of Representatives from Pennsylvania's 17th congressional district 1843–1845	Succeeded by John Blanchard
