= 1829 Pennsylvania gubernatorial election =

- October 13, 1829
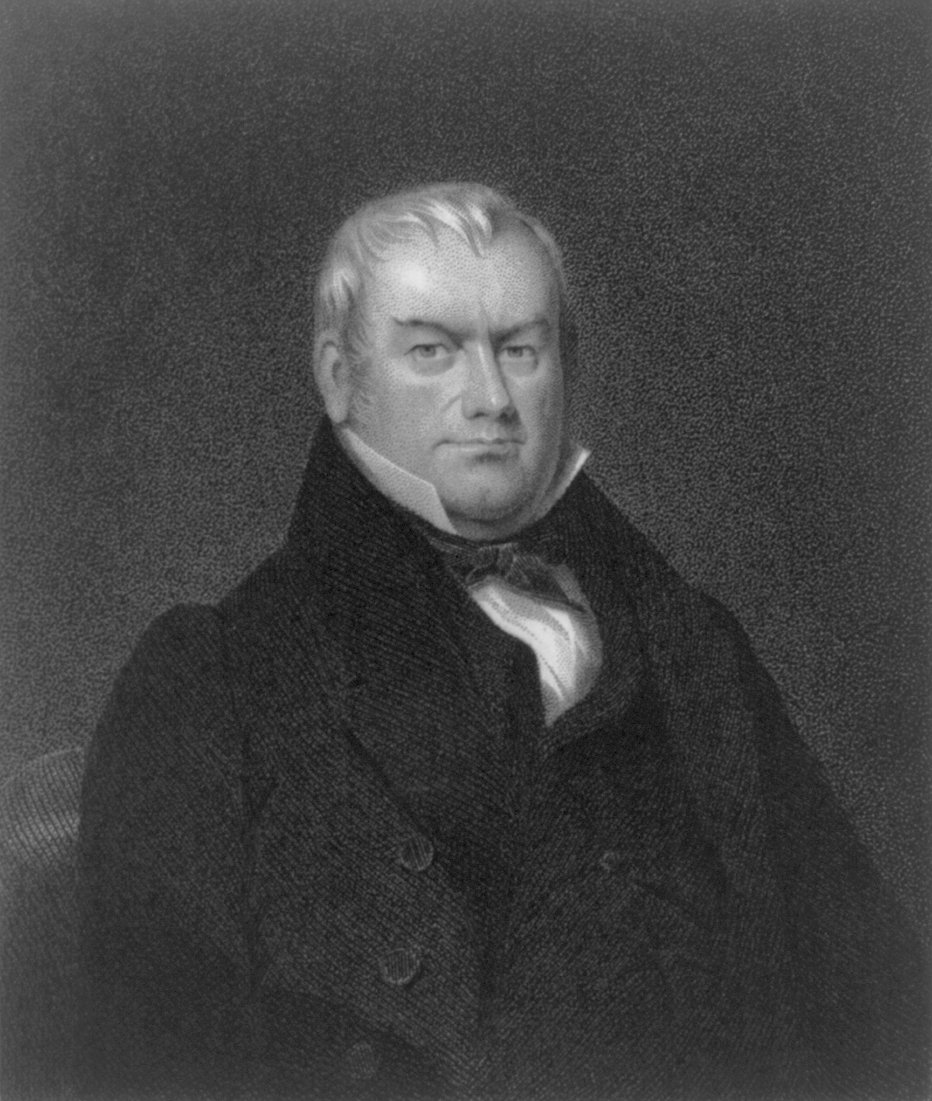

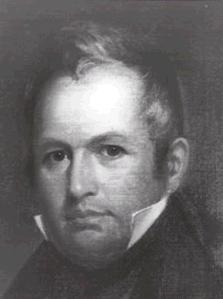
Nominee	George Wolf	Joseph Ritner
Party	Democratic	Anti-Masonic
Popular vote	78,219	51,776
Percentage	60.17%	39.83%
- County Results; Wolf: 50–60% 60–70% 70–80% 80–90% 90–100% Tie: 50% Ritner: 50–60% 60–70%
Governor before election
John Andrew Shulze
Democratic
Elected Governor
George Wolf
Democratic

The 1829 Pennsylvania gubernatorial election occurred on October 13, 1829. U.S. Representative George Wolf, a Democrat, defeated Anti-Masonic candidate Joseph Ritner to win the election. Delaware County would continuously vote against the Democratic candidate for the next 157 years until 1986.

== Results ==
Pennsylvania gubernatorial election, 1829
Party	Candidate	Votes	%
Democratic	George Wolf	78,219	60.17
Anti-Masonic	Joseph Ritner	51,776	39.83
Total votes		129,995	100.00
