= Francis R. Shunk =

American politician and 10th Governor of Pennsylvania

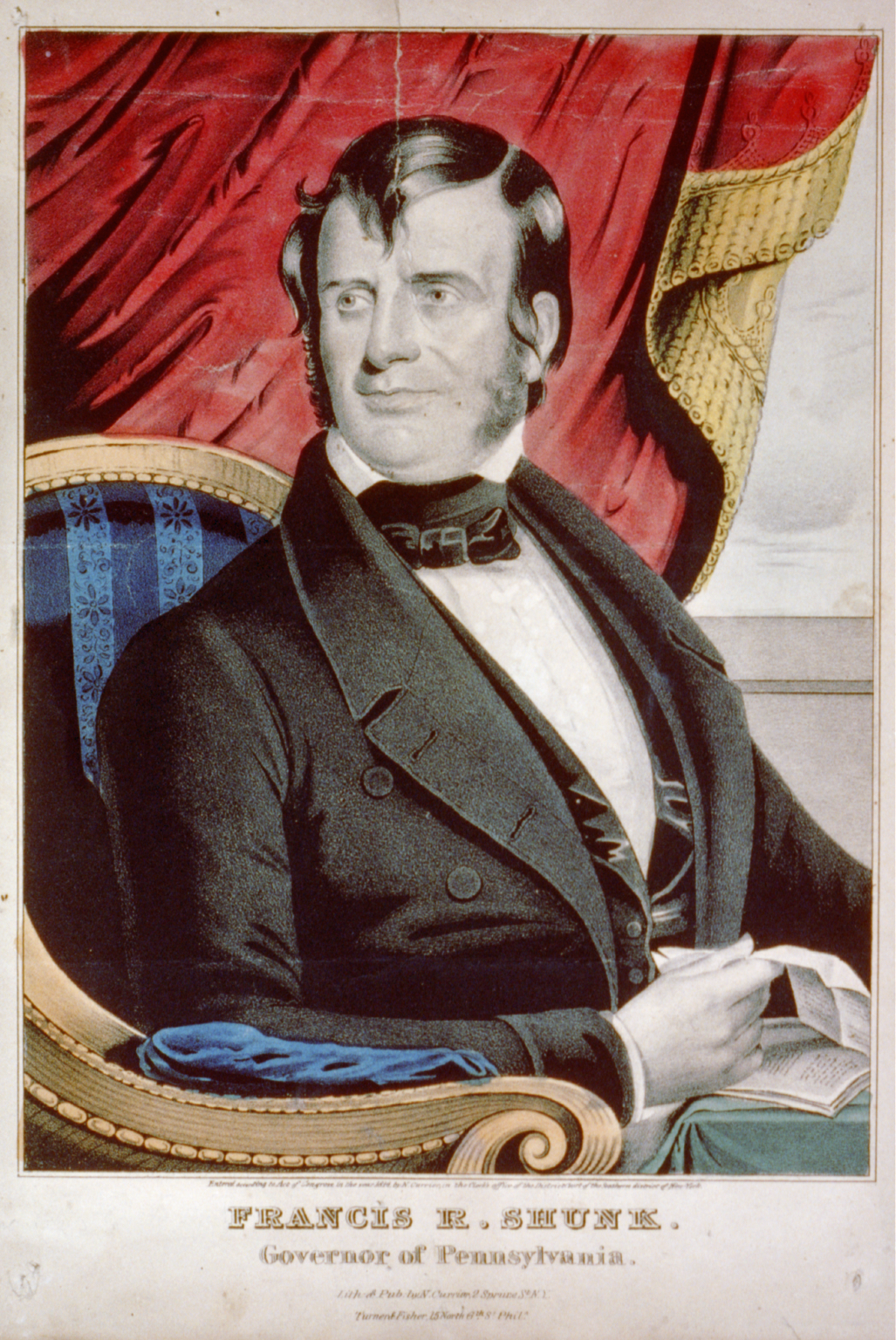

10th Governor of Pennsylvania
- In office January 21, 1845 – July 9, 1848
- Preceded by: David R. Porter
- Succeeded by: William F. Johnston

Personal details
- Born: Francis Rawn Shunk; August 7, 1788 Trappe, Pennsylvania, U.S.
- Died: July 20, 1848 (aged 59) Harrisburg, Pennsylvania, U.S.
- Party: Democratic
- Spouse: Jane Findlay (1820–1848)

Francis Rawn Shunk (August 7, 1788 – July 20, 1848) was the tenth governor of Pennsylvania from 1845 to 1848.

== Early career ==
Shunk was born on August 7, 1788, in Trappe, Pennsylvania, to a poor farming family of German descent. He began working on his father's farm at age 10. He continued to attend school, and by age 16 had received his qualification as a teacher and started working in the schools.

Originally a Democratic-Republican in politics, and later a Democrat, in 1812 Shunk was appointed Clerk to state Surveyor General Andrew Porter, the father of Governor David R. Porter. Shunk served in the Pennsylvania militia during the War of 1812, and took part in the 1814 defense of Baltimore.

After the war, Shunk was appointed Principal Clerk of the Pennsylvania House of Representatives. In 1820, he married Jane Findlay, daughter of Pennsylvania Governor and Senator, William Findlay, and Pennsylvania First Lady Nancy Irwin Findlay.

From 1829 to 1839, Shunk served as Secretary of the state Canal Commission, a critical position in the government during a period when major canal, railroad and other public works projects were planned and constructed.

In 1839, Shunk was appointed Secretary of the Commonwealth, and he served until 1842.

== Governor of Pennsylvania ==
When Democratic gubernatorial candidate Henry A. P. Muhlenberg unexpectedly died in August 1844, Shunk was selected as the party's replacement nominee. He narrowly defeated Whig candidate Joseph Markle. A large crowd attended Shunk's inaugural ceremonies, which were held during a snowstorm on January 21, 1845.

Reelected during the 1847 Pennsylvania gubernatorial election, he was compelled to retire before his second term was complete due to failing health caused by tuberculosis. He resigned on July 9, 1848, and died in Harrisburg on July 20, 1848, just eleven days after tendering his resignation. Shunk was buried at the Augustus Lutheran Church Cemetery in Trappe, Pennsylvania.

== Legacy ==
- Shunk Hall on the University Park campus of the Pennsylvania State University is named in his honor.
- Shunk Street in Philadelphia is also named for him, as is Governor F.R. Shunk Avenue in Carlisle.
- The village of Shunk in Fox Township, Sullivan County, home to the Endless Winds Volunteer Fire Department is also named for him.

Party political offices
Preceded by David R. Porter	Democratic nominee for Governor of Pennsylvania; 1844, 1847	Succeeded by Morris Longstreth
Political offices
Preceded by Thomas Henry Burrowes	Secretary of the Commonwealth of Pennsylvania; 1839–1842	Succeeded by Anson V. Parsons
Preceded by David R. Porter	Governor of Pennsylvania; 1845–1848	Succeeded by William F. Johnston
