= George Wolf =

American politician, 7th Governor of Pennsylvania (1777–1840)

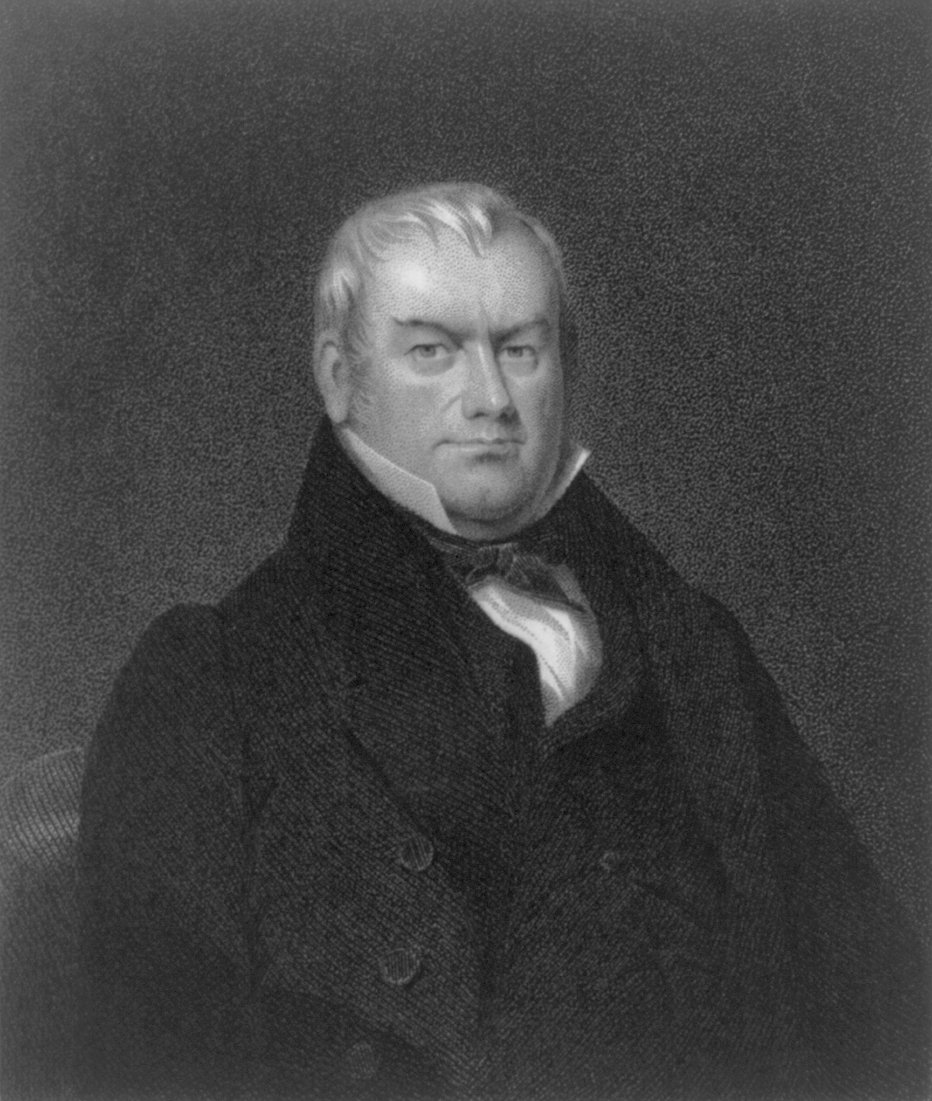
- Portrait of Wolf now housed at the Library of Congress

7th Governor of Pennsylvania
- In office December 15, 1829 – December 15, 1835
- Preceded by: John Andrew Shulze
- Succeeded by: Joseph Ritner

Member of the U.S. House of Representatives from Pennsylvania's 8th district
- In office December 9, 1824 – 1829
- Preceded by: Thomas J. Rogers, Samuel D. Ingham
- Succeeded by: Peter Ihrie, Jr., Samuel A. Smith

Member of the Pennsylvania House of Representatives
- In office 1814

Personal details
- Born: August 12, 1777 Allen Township, Pennsylvania, U.S.
- Died: March 11, 1840 (aged 62) Philadelphia, Pennsylvania, U.S.
- Resting place: Harrisburg Cemetery, Harrisburg, Pennsylvania, U.S.
- Party: Democratic
- Spouse: Mary Erb (1798–1833; her death)

George Wolf (August 12, 1777 – March 11, 1840) was the seventh governor of Pennsylvania from 1829 to 1835. On June 29, 1888, he was recognized as the "father of the public-school system" in Pennsylvania by the erection of a memorial gateway at Easton.

== Early life and education ==
Wolf was born in Allen Township, Northampton County, Pennsylvania, in present-day Northampton County, Pennsylvania, to George and Mary Wolf, who immigrated to the United States from Alsace, then part of France, in 1751. Wolf was educated at a classical school, taught for some time, and then studied law. He was admitted to the bar in 1799 and commenced practice in Easton, Pennsylvania.

== Career ==
=== Pennsylvania state politics ===
Wolf became a member of the Democratic Republican Party at the beginning of Thomas Jefferson's administration, and was appointed postmaster of Easton, where he served n 1802 and 1803. He was a clerk of the orphans' court of Northampton County, Pennsylvania, from 1803 to 1809, and a member of the Pennsylvania House of Representatives in 1814.

=== U.S. House of Representatives ===
Wolf was elected without opposition to the United States House of Representatives in 1824 to the Eighteenth Congress to fill the vacancy caused by the resignation of Thomas J. Rogers. He was reelected to the Nineteenth, Twentieth, and Twenty-first Congresses. He took the protectionist side in debates on the tariff. during his second term he chaired the Committee on Revolutionary Claims.

=== Governor of Pennsylvania ===
As member of the Jacksonian Democratic Party, Wolf defeated Joseph Ritner in both 1829 and 1832 to become the Governor of Pennsylvania. A large crowd attended his inaugural ceremonies on December 15, 1829. Wolf was in office during the 1834 Philadelphia race riot.

He lost the governor's seat to the Anti-Mason candidate Ritner in 1835, owing to the defection of a part of the Democrats, who voted for Henry A. Muhlenberg.

As governor, Wolf persuaded the legislature to construct canals and impose new taxes for the liquidation of debts that had already been incurred on account of internal improvements. Wolf advocated the establishment of a general system of common schools, and by strenuous efforts accomplished this reform where former governors had failed. In the wake of the hanging of Charles Getter in Easton, which was viewed by up to 20,000 people, Wolf signed a law on April 10, 1834, banning public executions.

=== Lafayette College ===
From 1827 to 1840, Wolf was a trustee of Lafayette College in Easton, Pennsylvania.

=== Final years ===
In 1836, Andrew Jackson appointed him as First Comptroller of the Treasury. Two years later, President Martin Van Buren appointed him as Collector of Customs for the District of Philadelphia in a job swap with James Nelson Barker. He held this office until his death.

== Personal life ==
Wolf married Mary Erb (1781–1833) of Lancaster, Pennsylvania, on June 5, 1798. The couple had eight sons and one daughter.

== Legacy ==
Buildings, schools, and streets named for Wolf include:

- Governor Wolf Building, built in 1893 as the first Easton High School in Easton, Pennsylvania
- George Wolf Elementary School in Bath, Pennsylvania
- Governor Wolf Elementary School in Bethlehem, Pennsylvania
- Governor Wolf Historical Society and Wolf Academy, where Wolf received a classical education, in Bath, Pennsylvania
- Wolf Hall at Pennsylvania State University. Wolf's name is also inscribed on the Burrowes Building the university
- Wolf Street in Philadelphia
- Wolf Township in Lycoming County, Pennsylvania

Party political offices
| Preceded by John Andrew Shulze | Democratic nominee for Governor of Pennsylvania; 1829, 1832 | Succeeded by Henry A. P. Muhlenberg |
U.S. House of Representatives
| Preceded by Thomas J. Rogers, Samuel D. Ingham | Member of the U.S. House of Representatives from Pennsylvania's 8th congressional district 1824–1829 alongside: Samuel D. Ingham | Succeeded by Peter Ihrie, Jr., Samuel A. Smith |
Political offices
| Preceded by John Andrew Shulze | Governor of Pennsylvania; 1829–1835 | Succeeded by Joseph Ritner |
