= Henry Muhlenberg =

German-born clergyman and missionary (1711–1787)

The Reverend Henry Muhlenberg
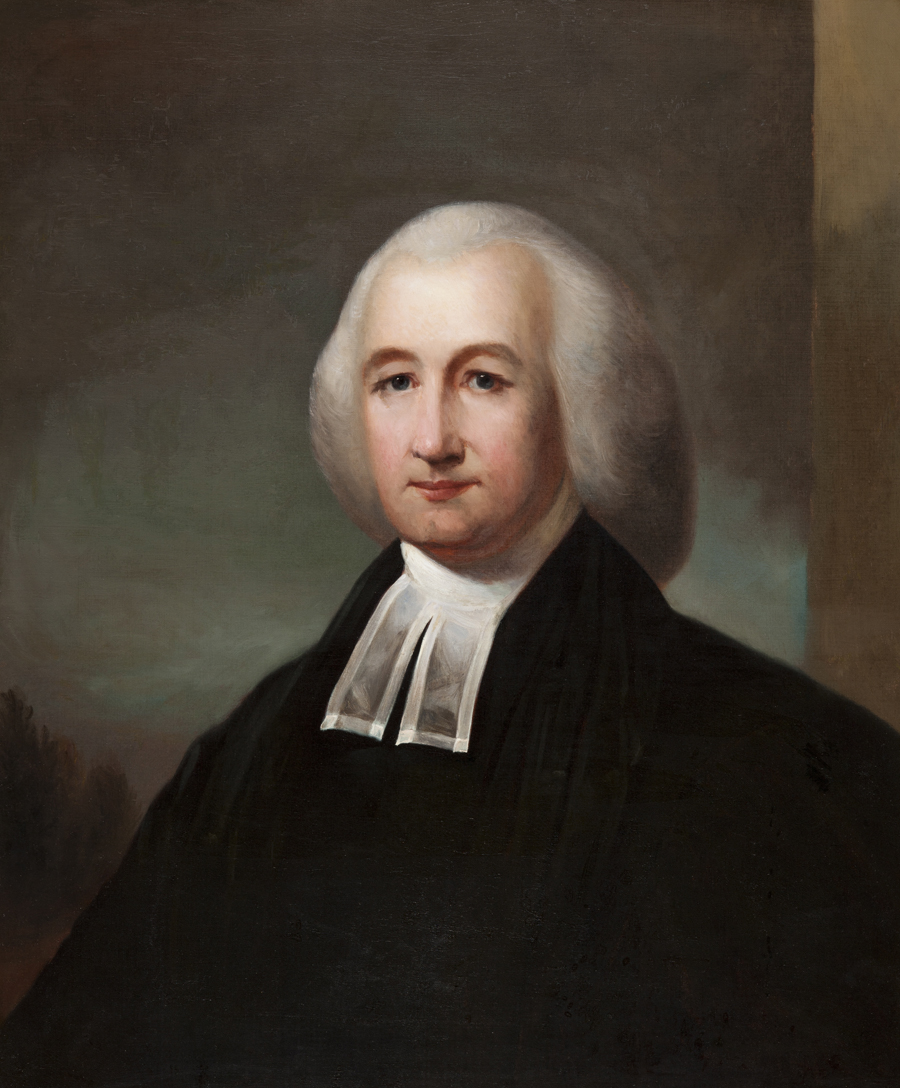
- c. 1780 portrait of Muhlenberg
- Born: Heinrich Melchior Mühlenberg; September 6, 1711; Einbeck, Electorate of Hanover, Holy Roman Empire
- Died: October 7, 1787 (aged 76); Trappe, Pennsylvania, U.S.
- Education: University of Halle
- Children: See Muhlenberg family
- Church: Pennsylvania Ministerium
- Title: Patriarch of the Lutheran church in America

Henry Melchior Muhlenberg (born Heinrich Melchior Mühlenberg; September 6, 1711 – October 7, 1787), was a German-born Lutheran clergyman and missionary. Born in Einbeck, Muhlenberg immigrated to the Province of Pennsylvania in response to demands from Lutherans for missionary work in the colony. Muhlenberg was integral to the founding of the first Lutheran church body or denomination in North America, and is considered the patriarch of the Lutheran Church in the United States.

Muhlenberg and his wife Anna Maria had a large family, and they and their descendants had a significant impact on colonial life in North America as pastors, military officers, and politicians. He and Anna Maria's descendants continued to be active in Pennsylvania and national political life.

== Early life and education ==
Henry Muhlenberg's coat of arms

Muhlenberg was born on September 6, 1711, in Einbeck in the Electorate of Hanover, Germany, to Nicolaus Melchior Mühlenberg and Anna Maria Kleinschmid. He studied theology at the University of Göttingen. As a student, Muhlenberg came under the influence of the Pietist movement through fellow students from Einbeck who had worked at the Francke Foundations in Halle, an important Pietist institution. With two other men, Muhlenberg started a charity school in Göttingen that eventually became an orphanage.

== Career ==
After completing his studies in the spring 1738, Muhlenberg secured a teaching position at the Francke Foundation's Historic Orphanage. Its director, the theologian Gotthilf August Francke was the son and successor of the Foundation's founder, August Hermann Francke and a professor at the University of Halle.

Muhlenberg was ordained in Leipzig in 1739, and served as assistant minister and director of the orphanage at Grosshennersdorf from 1739 to 1741. In 1741, Gotthilf August Francke encouraged Muhlenberg to accept a call from German-speaking Lutherans in Pennsylvania. Accordingly, in 1742 Muhlenberg emigrated across the Atlantic Ocean, where he essentially organized the Lutheran Church as an institution in North America.

=== Lutheran Church in Pennsylvania and New Jersey ===
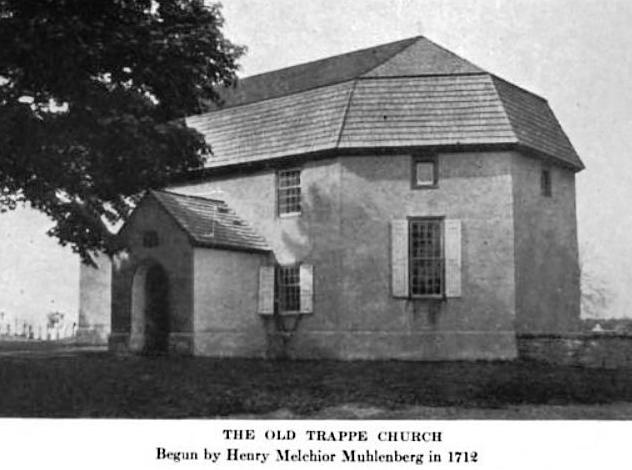
Exterior of the Old Trappe Church founded by Henry Muhlenberg

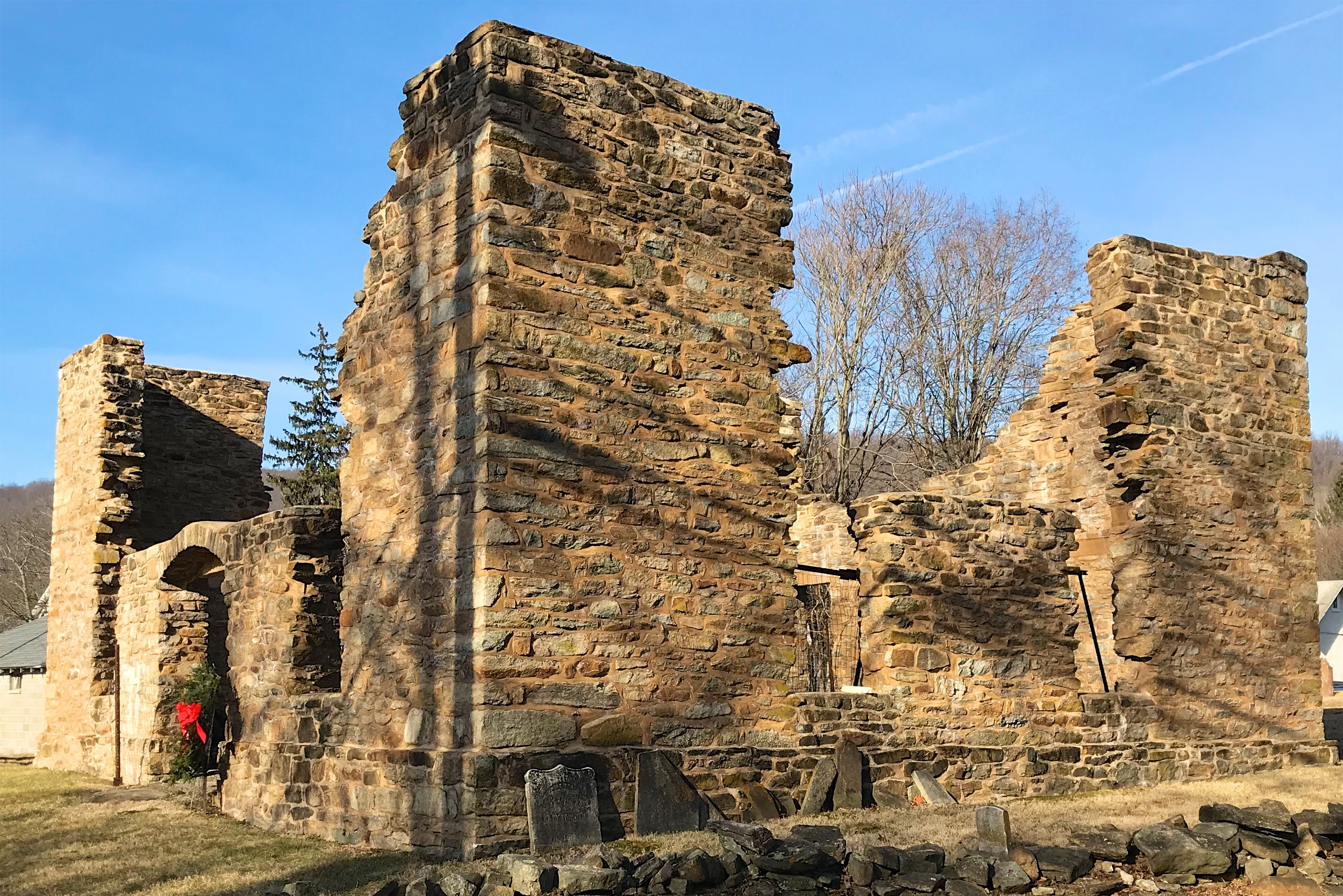
Ruins of the Old Stone Union Church in German Valley, New Jersey

The Lutheran churches in Pennsylvania had largely been founded by lay ministers. After Nicolaus Zinzendorf was successful in winning a number of converts to the Moravian Church, the Lutherans asked German churches for formally trained clergy.

In 1742, Muhlenberg immigrated to Philadelphia, responding to the 1732 request by Pennsylvania Lutherans. He took charge Augustus Lutheran Church in present-day Trappe, Pennsylvania. He also provided leadership to a series of congregations elsewhere, including those from Maryland to New York, where he worked to secure control over less qualified pastors and started new congregations among the settlers of the region.

In 1748, he formed the Pennsylvania Ministerium, the first permanent Lutheran synod in the United States. He helped prepare a uniform liturgy the same year and wrote basic tenets for an ecclesiastical constitution, which most of the churches adopted in 1761. He did much work on a hymnal, published by the Ministerium in 1786.

The dedication stone of the Augustus Lutheran Church, above its door, is dedicated to Muhlenberg and its other founders. It reads, in Latin, translated into English: "Under the auspices of Christ, Henry Melchior Muhlenberg with his Council, J.N.Crosman, F.Marsteller, A.Heilman, J.Mueller, H.Haas, and H.Rebner, erected from the very foundation this building dedicated by the Society of the Augsburg Confession. A.D.1743." The name of the first church—Augustus—was adopted in honor of Herman Augustus Francke, founder of the Halle Institutions, whose son, Gotthilf, had persuaded Muhlenberg to accept the call of the three United Congregations in America.

Muhlenberg frequently traveled beyond the three congregations assigned to him. During his 45-year ministry, his journeys reached from New York to Georgia. He ministered to the German language populations he was assigned to, and also to colonists from the Netherlands and Great Britain in their native languages. His colleagues requested his help in arbitrating disputes among Lutherans, or in some cases, with other religious groups.

Muhlenberg worked to recruit new ministers from Europe and to develop more ministers from the colonists. Built in 1774 in Washington Township, New Jersey, the Old Stone Union Church housed a congregation largely organized by Muhlenberg. His eldest son, Peter Gabriel Muhlenberg, also served as pastor there and served as a major general in the Continental Army.

Poor health forced him into limited activity and retirement. On October 7, 1787, Muhlenberg died at his home in Trappe, Pennsylvania, at age 76. He is interred in the rear of Augustus Lutheran Church, as are his wife Anna Maria and their son Peter. At his request, he was buried next to the grave of his good friend, sponsor, and Augustus Church co-founder, Frederick Ludwig Marsteller.

== Legacy ==
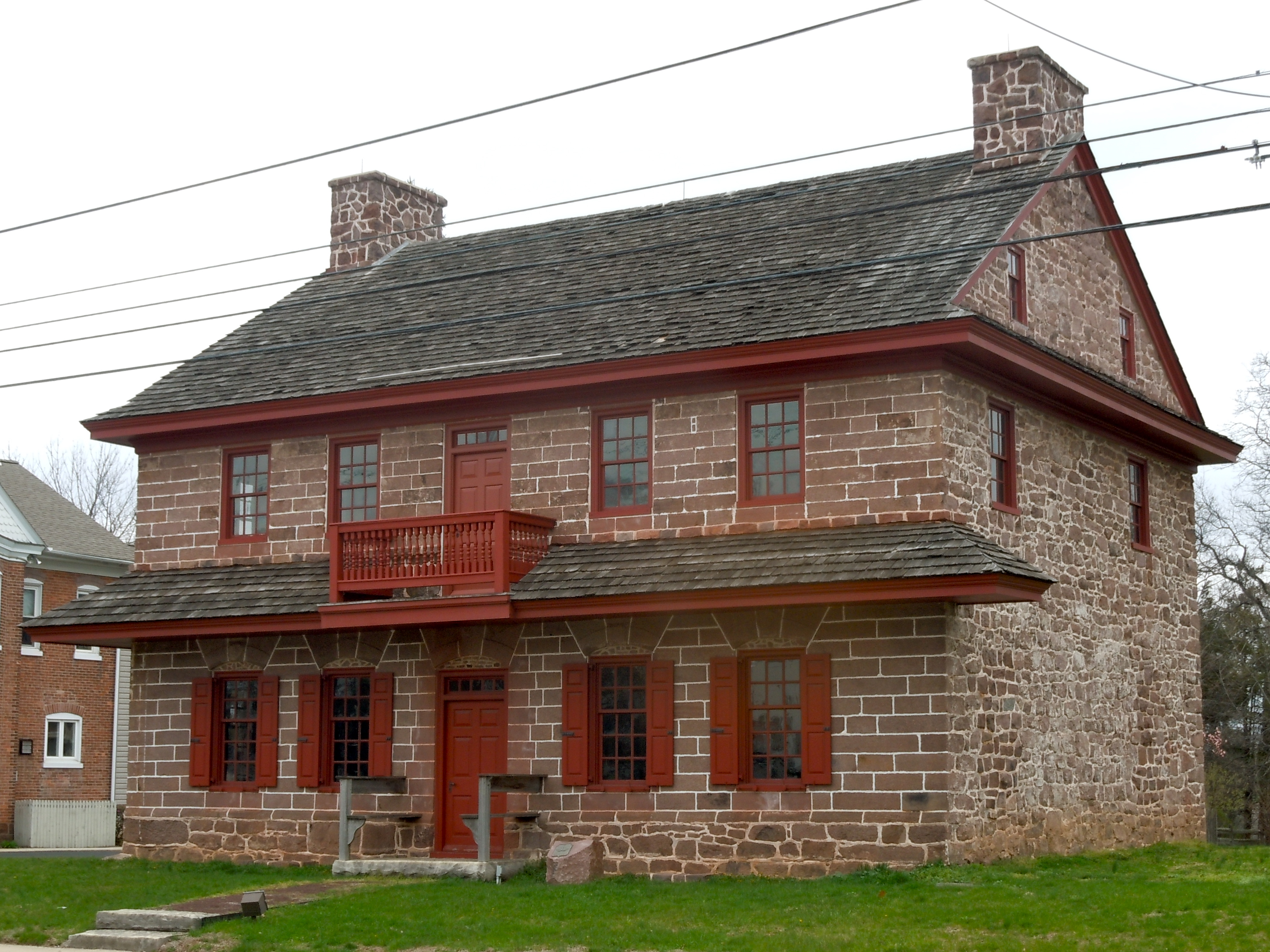
The Henry Melchior Muhlenberg House in Trappe, Pennsylvania, named in Muhlenberg's honor

Soon after arriving in Pennsylvania in 1745, Muhlenberg married Anna Maria Weiser, the daughter of colonial leader Conrad Weiser. The couple had eleven children and founded the Muhlenberg Family dynasty, generations of which were active in the U.S. military, politics, academia, and ministry.

Among his children, three sons entered the ministry and became prominent in other fields, a fourth, Peter, became a scientist and academic, a Major General in the Continental Army, and later was elected to the United States Congress; Frederick served as the first Speaker of the House in the U.S. Congress after his election to office; Henry, Jr. became pastor of the Zion Lutheran Church at Oldwick, New Jersey; and Henry Ernst was an early scientist and the first president of Franklin College, which is now Franklin & Marshall College.

His daughter Elisabeth married future general Francis Swaine. Maria Salome ("Sally") married the future U.S. Congressman Matthias Richards. Eve married Emmanuel Shulze, and their son John Andrew Schulze was elected Governor of Pennsylvania.

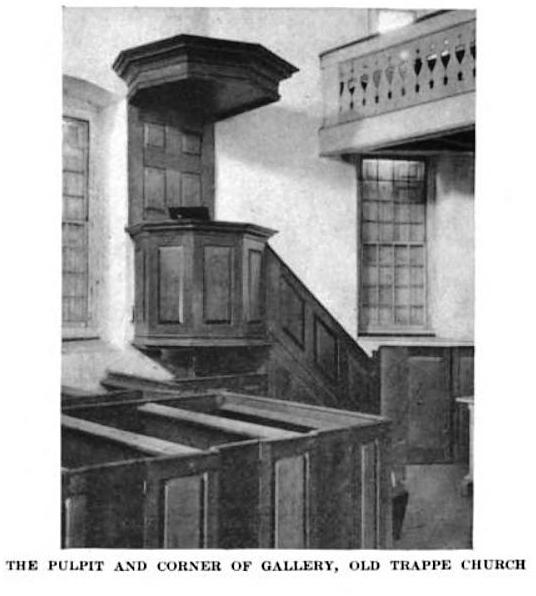
Interior of the Old Trappe Church

== Legacy and honors ==
- Henry Melchior Muhlenberg is commemorated on October 7 in the Calendar of Saints in worship books and hymnals such as the Lutheran Book of Worship, Lutheran Worship, Evangelical Lutheran Worship, Lutheran Service Book, and in supplementary ecumenical common liturgies and lectionaries used by most Lutheran congregations in the United States and Canada.
- Muhlenberg College, an ELCA-affiliated institution in Allentown, Pennsylvania is named in his honor.
- The "Muhlenberg Monument", named Man of Vision and sculpted by American artist Stanley Wanlass, is located on the campus of Muhlenberg College.
- Lake Muhlenberg, located near the college in Allentown, is named in his honor.
- The Henry Melchior Muhlenberg House was added to the National Register of Historic Places, maintained by the National Park Service of the U.S. Department of the Interior, in 2000.
- The Muhlenberg Building at 13th & Spruce Streets in Center City Philadelphia and the Muhlenberg Building at 2900 Queens Lane in Northwest Philadelphia. The former is a 1922 Collegiate Gothic high-rise designed by Clarence Edmond Wunder that served as the headquarters for the United Lutheran Publication House (ULPH)--the official press of the United Lutheran Church in America (ULCA) until the 1960s; the latter is a distinctive U-shaped two-story structure of Georgian and Federal architectural style with red brick, white wood, and limestone trim that served as the headquarters of ULPH's successors Muhlenberg Press and then its successor, Fortress Press of the Lutheran Church in America (LCA). Both contained the editorial offices of The Lutheran, the bi-monthly magazine of both the ULCA and the LCA. The former building now functions as an apartment complex, while the latter is now part of Drexel University's College of Medicine.

== See also ==
- Muhlenberg family
- Johann Christopher Kunze

== Other sources ==
- Mann, William J. Life and Times of Henry Melchior Muhlenberg, Philadelphia: G.W. Frederick. 1888
- Wolf, Edmund Jacob. The Lutherans in America; a story of struggle, progress, influence and marvelous growth, New York: J.A. Hill. 1889
- Frick, William K. Henry Melchior Muhlenberg, Patriarch of the Lutheran Church in America, Lutheran Publication Society, 1902
- Hermann Wellenreuther / Thomas Müller-Bahlke / A. Gregg Roeber: The Transatlantic World of Heinrich Melchior Mühlenberg in the Eighteenth Century. Publisher: Otto Harrassowitz (January 9, 2013), ISBN 978-3447069632
