= Henry Melchior Muhlenberg House =

Historic house in Pennsylvania, United States

- U.S. National Register of Historic Places
- Pennsylvania Historical Marker
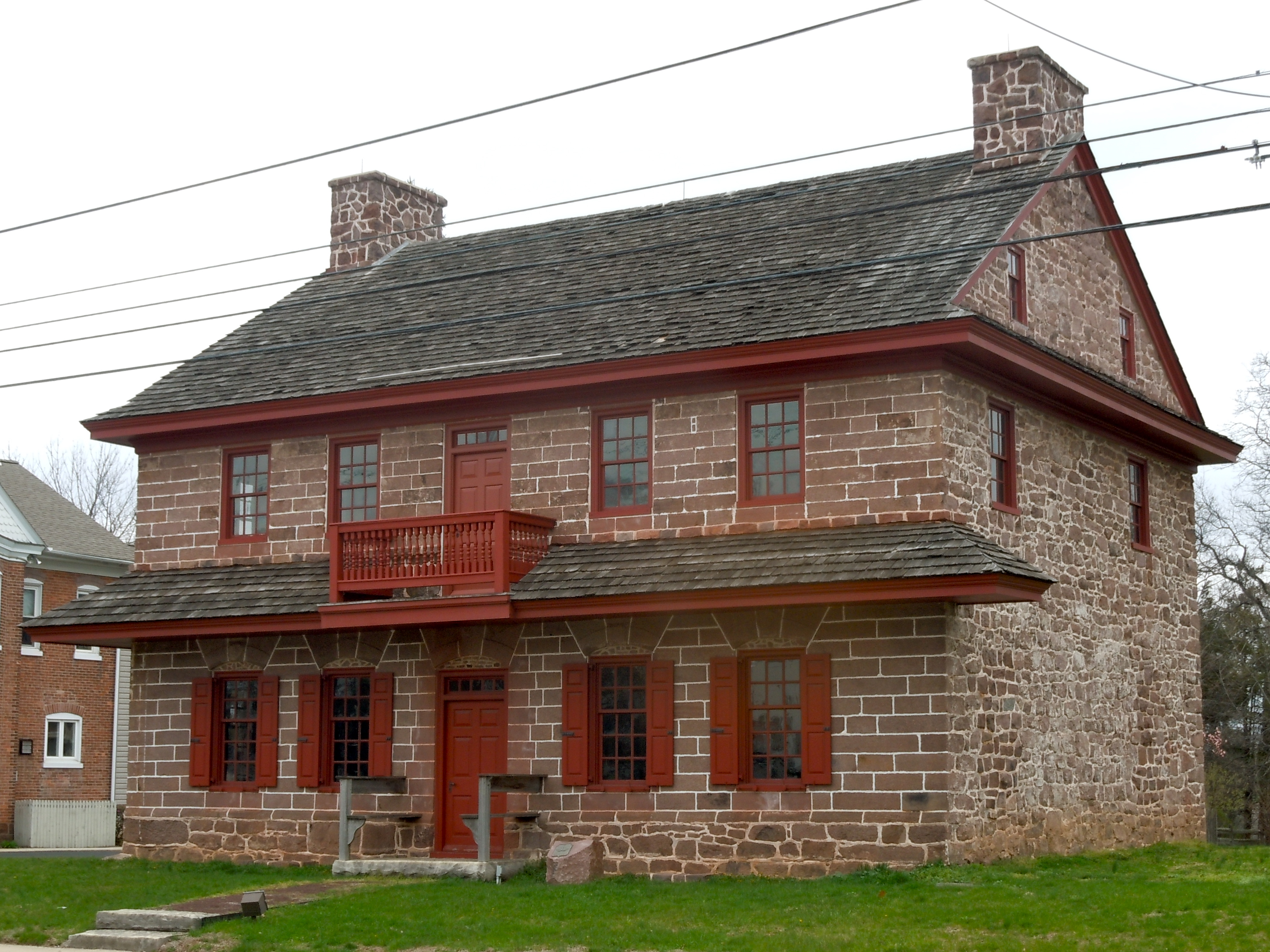
- Henry Melchior Muhlenberg House, April 2011

- Location within Pennsylvania Location within the United States
- Location: 201 W. Main St., Trappe, Pennsylvania
- Coordinates: 40°11′47″N 75°28′13″W
- Area: 1.7 acres (0.69 ha)
- Built: c. 1720-1787
- Architectural style: Colonial
- NRHP reference No.: 00000060

Significant dates
- Added to NRHP: February 18, 2000
- Designated PHMC: April 28, 1960

The Henry Melchior Muhlenberg House, also known as the John J. Schrack House, is an historic home which is located in Trappe, Montgomery County, Pennsylvania.

A Pennsylvania historical marker which documents this structure's significance was dedicated on April 28, 1960. The house was subsequently added to the National Register of Historic Places in 2000.

== History and architectural features ==
Built circa 1755, this historic house is a 2 1/2-story, five-bay, stone dwelling with a gable roof. It measures approximately thirty-nine feet by thirty-one feet. Between 1994 and 1998, the house was restored to its 1776-1787 appearance, which was the period of residency by Rev. Henry Melchior Muhlenberg (1711-1787), patriarch of the Lutheran Church in the United States, and father of Peter Muhlenberg (1746-1807) and Frederick Muhlenberg (1750-1801).

Also located on the property are the remains of a pottery kiln which dates to roughly 1720. It is the oldest intact pottery kiln known in the Commonwealth of Pennsylvania.

The house is owned by the Trappe Historical Society and open as a historic house museum.
