= 1832 Pennsylvania gubernatorial election =

- October 9, 1832
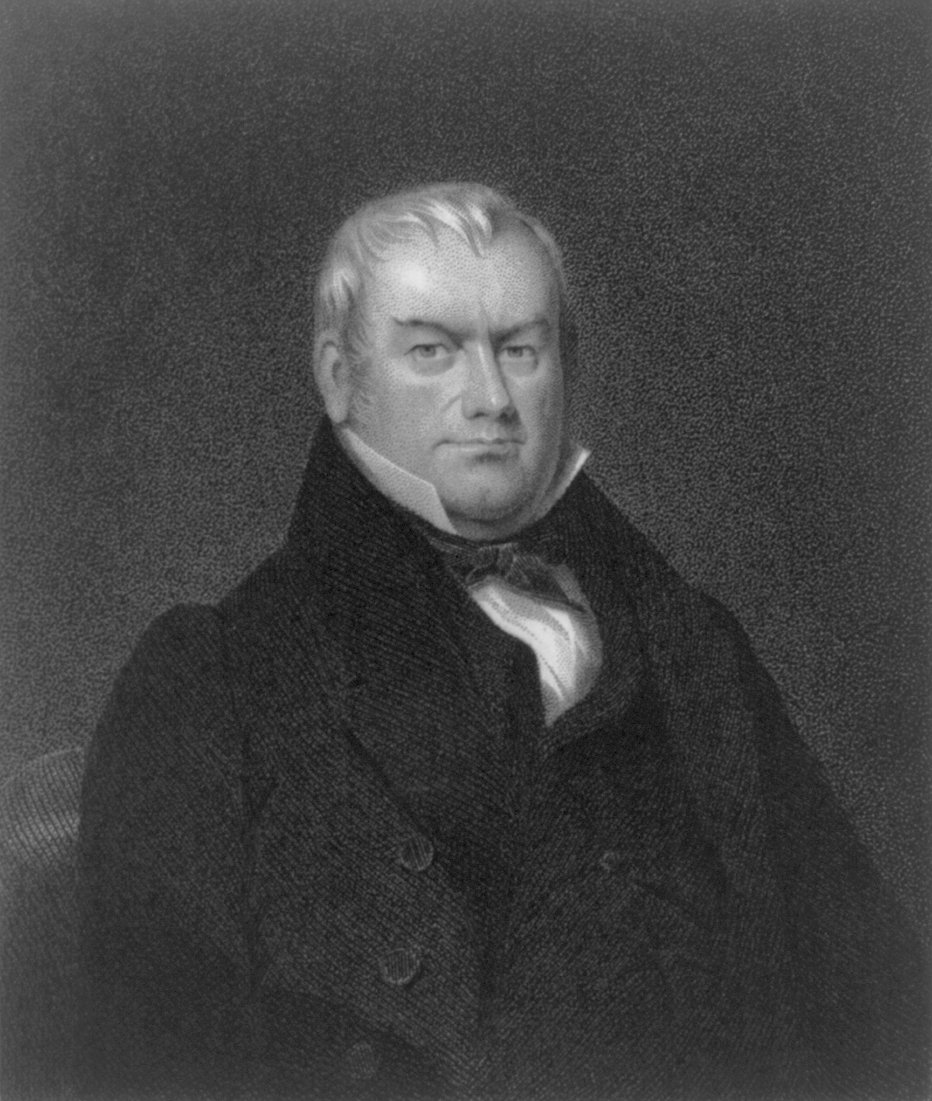

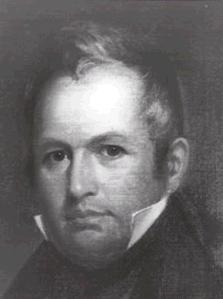
Nominee	George Wolf	Joseph Ritner
Party	Democratic	Anti-Masonic
Popular vote	91,335	88,165
Percentage	50.88%	49.12%
- County Results; Wolf: 50–60% 60–70% 70–80% 80–90% 90–100% Ritner: 50–60% 60–70%
Governor before election
George Wolf
Democratic
Elected Governor
George Wolf
Democratic

The 1832 Pennsylvania gubernatorial election occurred on October 9, 1832. Incumbent Governor George Wolf, a Democrat, defeated Anti-Masonic candidate Joseph Ritner to win re-election.

== Results ==
Pennsylvania gubernatorial election, 1832
Party	Candidate	Votes	%
Democratic	George Wolf (incumbent)	91,335	50.88
Anti-Masonic	Joseph Ritner	88,165	49.12
Total votes		179,500	100.00
