= 1835 Pennsylvania gubernatorial election =

- October 13, 1835
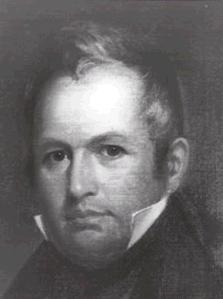

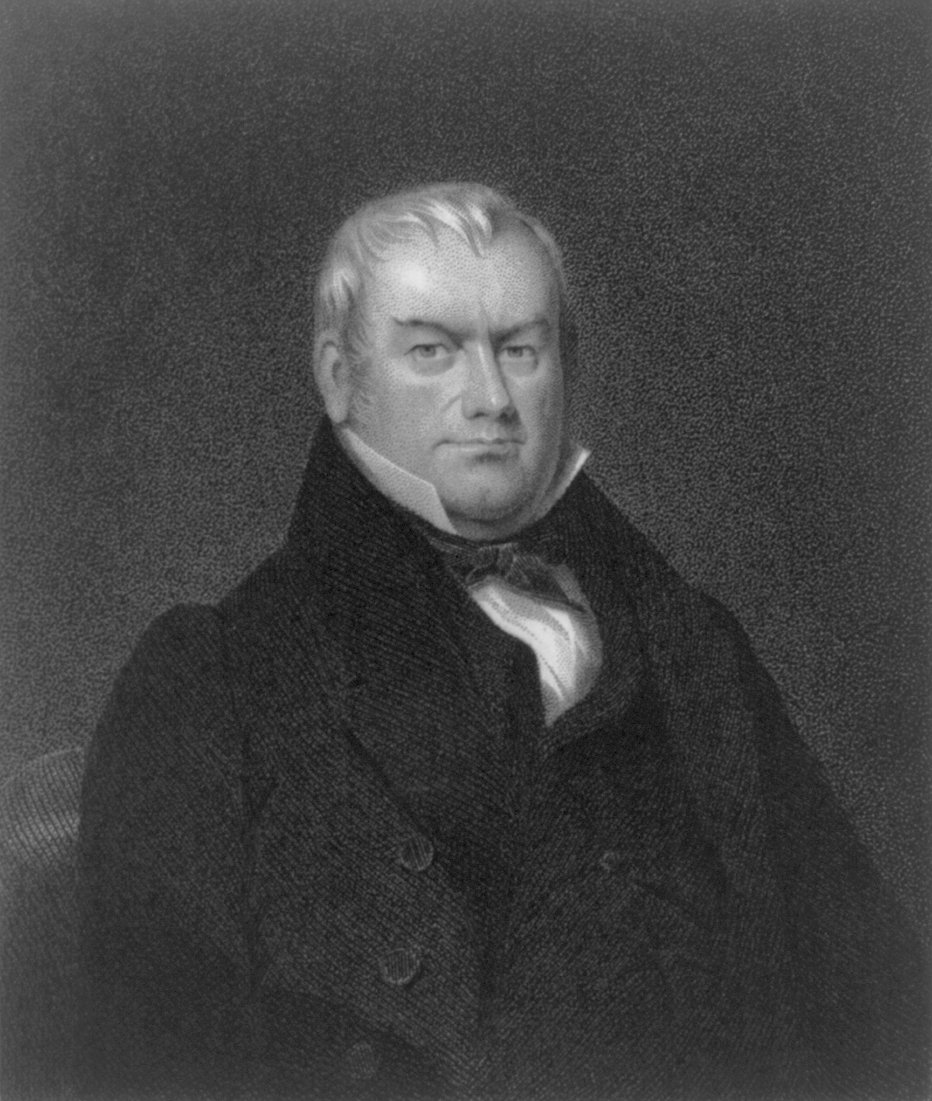

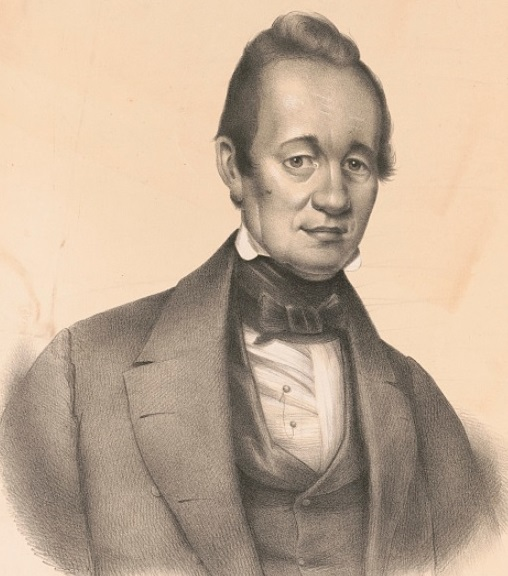
Nominee	Joseph Ritner	George Wolf	Henry A. P. Muhlenberg
Party	Anti-Masonic	Independent Democrat	Democratic
Popular vote	94,023	65,804	40,586
Percentage	46.91%	32.83%	20.25%
- County Results; Ritner: 30–40% 40–50% 50–60% 60–70% 70–80% Wolf: 30–40% 40–50% 50–60% 60–70% 70–80% 80–90% Muhlenberg: 30–40% 40–50%
Governor before election
George Wolf
Democratic
Elected Governor
Joseph Ritner
Anti-Masonic

The 1835 Pennsylvania gubernatorial election was among three candidates. Incumbent Governor George Wolf ran as an Independent Democrat. In the end Joseph Ritner won the election and became Pennsylvania's only Anti-Masonic governor.

== Democratic schism ==
In March 1835 factionalism came to a head in Pennsylvania's dominant Democratic party as it convened at Harrisburg to nominate its candidate for governor. The supporters of the incumbent Wolf and those of Lutheran pastor Henry Muhlenberg, known respectively as the "Wolves" and the "Mules", deadlocked and adjourned to reconvene at Lewistown in May. The Wolf delegates, however, remained at Harrisburg and in a rump convention renominated the governor. The outraged "Mules" then proceeded as scheduled to Lewistown to nominate Muhlenberg.

The resulting split Democratic vote enabled the Anti-Masons, with Whig support, to finally elect Ritner, who had lost the previous two elections.

Tension between the "Wolves" and the "Mules" lasted until the mid-1840s.

== Results ==
Pennsylvania gubernatorial election, 1835
Party	Candidate	Votes	%
Anti-Masonic	Joseph Ritner	94,023	46.91
Independent Democrat	George Wolf (incumbent)	65,804	32.83
Democratic	Henry A. P. Muhlenberg	40,586	20.25
Total votes		200,413	100.00
