= Getter's Island =

Island in the Delaware River off Pennsylvania, USA

- Location within Pennsylvania

Geography
- Location: In the Delaware River, off Easton, Pennsylvania
- Coordinates: 40°41′51″N 75°12′09″W
- Area: 2.3 ha (5.7 acres)

Administration
- United States

Demographics
- Population: Uninhabited

Getter's Island, previously known as Abel's Island, is a small island in the Delaware River in Easton, Pennsylvania. It is best known as the location of the execution of Charles Getter, the last person to be publicly executed in Pennsylvania.

== History ==
=== Execution of Charles Getter ===
The island is named after Charles Getter, a farmhand who was hanged on the island in 1833 for the murder of Margaret Lawall, a woman he married to avoid prosecution for impregnating her outside of wedlock. Getter's execution was initially scheduled to take place at Center Square in Easton, but it was moved to the island — then known as Abel's Island — to accommodate the crowds.

An estimated 15,000 to 20,000 people, some of whom traveled hundreds of miles, gathered in the town to view the execution. An initial attempt to hang him failed, forcing a second attempt, which resulted in his death. A reporter who witnessed the scene was horrified at how little the crowd was affected by the execution, and called on lawmakers to take action against such public executions.

Governor George Wolf agreed with the reporter and signed a law banning public execution on April 10, 1834. As a result, Getter was the last person in Pennsylvania to be publicly executed.

=== Recent history ===
In the decades after the execution, Getter's Island was purchased by a lumber company that installed a mill there, while Wilson Dam at the southern end of the island provided a pool of water that was used by young people for swimming. The mill burned down in the 1920s.

After the burning of the mill, the island was sold to Dr. Leo H. Cericola, who built a 100-foot-long suspension bridge to the island and created a small amusement park called Tropical Island in the 1940s. The amusement park, which offered swimming, picnicking and pony rides, was abandoned when a flood destroyed the bridge in 1944.

The island was sold to the family of Lee and Mary Heilman in the late 1950s, who used it for recreational purposes.

The island was put on sale in July 2018, with an asking price of $150,000. It was again put up for sale in 2021, this time with an asking price of $200,000, which was reduced to $175,000 by 2023. In 2025, it was relisted for just $3,000.

== See also ==
- List of islands of the United States
