= Joseph Ritner =

American politician

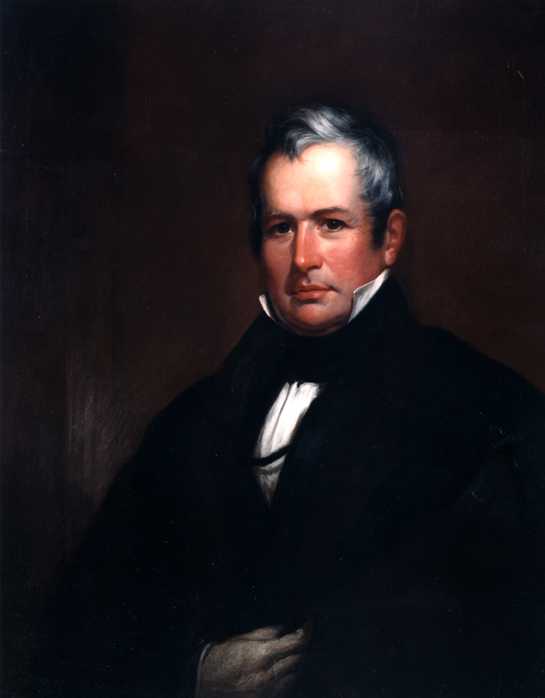

8th Governor of Pennsylvania
- In office December 15, 1835 – January 15, 1839
- Preceded by: George Wolf
- Succeeded by: David R. Porter

17th Speaker of the Pennsylvania House of Representatives
- In office 1826–1828
- Preceded by: Joel Barlow Sutherland
- Succeeded by: Ner Middleswarth

Member of the Pennsylvania House of Representatives
- In office 1820–1826

Personal details
- Born: March 25, 1780 Reading, Pennsylvania, U.S.
- Died: October 16, 1869 (aged 89) Cumberland County, Pennsylvania, U.S.
- Party: Democratic-Republican (before 1828); Anti-Masonic (1828–1839); Whig (1839–1854); Republican (1854–1869)
- Spouse: Susan Alter (m. 1801; died 1852)
- Profession: Farmer

Joseph Ritner (March 25, 1780 – October 16, 1869) was the eighth governor of Pennsylvania, and was a member of the Anti-Masonic Party. Elected governor during the 1835 Pennsylvania gubernatorial election, he served from 1835 to 1839.

Controversy surrounding his defeat in the 1838 Pennsylvania gubernatorial election sparked the Buckshot War.

In 1856, Governor Ritner served as a delegate to the first Republican National Convention in Philadelphia.

== Early life ==
Ritner was born in Reading, Pennsylvania, on March 25, 1780. His parents were of German heritage, and Ritner was primarily self-educated, including learning to read and write in English, while also acquiring a working knowledge of German. He moved to Cumberland County as a teenager, where he worked as a farm hand and laborer until he purchased a farm of his own in Washington County. In 1801, Ritner married Susan Alter, and they were the parents of 10 children. The Washington County farm had been owned by Ritner's wife's uncle, and included a large library, which enabled Ritner to continue his efforts at self-study.

During the War of 1812, Ritner served first as commander of a Washington County militia company, the Rifle Rangers. He later served as a private with his regiment in western Pennsylvania and Ohio.

== Political career ==
In 1820, Ritner was elected road supervisor in Washington County. Later that year he was elected to the Pennsylvania House of Representatives as a Democratic-Republican. He was reelected five times, and was Speaker in his final two terms.

Ritner became involved with the Anti-Masonic movement in the late 1820s, and after two defeats by George Wolf in his bids to become governor, he was finally successful during the 1835 election. A large crowd attended his inaugural ceremonies on December 15, 1835.

When the Second Bank of the United States lost its federal charter in 1836, Ritner signed legislation giving it a state charter. As a supporter of public education, Ritner prevented repeal of Pennsylvania's Public School Law of 1834, and succeeded in passage of an enhanced public school measure in 1836.

An ardent opponent of slavery, Ritner was the inspiration for an abolitionist poem by John Greenleaf Whittier, 1836's Ritner, in which Whittier praised the anti-slavery sentiment of the governor's annual message to the state legislature.

Toward the end of his tenure as governor, major changes were effected in Pennsylvania's system of state governance. The Pennsylvania State Constitution was amended, all White freemen over the age of twenty-one were given the right to vote, and the practice of awarding official positions as "life offices" was abolished.

Ritner's reputation, however, was negatively affected by Anti-Masonic efforts to gerrymander state legislative districts for their benefit. In addition, as Anti-Masons attempted to expand their support by taking positions on other issues, including expanded construction of public works. During this time, Ritner was criticized for allegedly using public rail and canal projects as a source of patronage.

When he ran for a second term as a Whig Party-supported, Anti-Masonic candidate during the controversial 1838 Pennsylvania gubernatorial election, which grew increasingly heated as anti-Masonic and anti-abolitionist rhetoric rose, he narrowly lost to Democratic nominee David Rittenhouse Porter, who, as a Grand Master of the Huntingdon Lodge of the Freemasons, had risen to the level of Deputy Grand Master of his Masonic district. Ritner and his supporters then unsuccessfully attempted to contest the election, including an effort by Ritner to mobilize the state militia, which sparked the Buckshot War. (The militia were to be armed with buckshot, thus giving the event its name.)

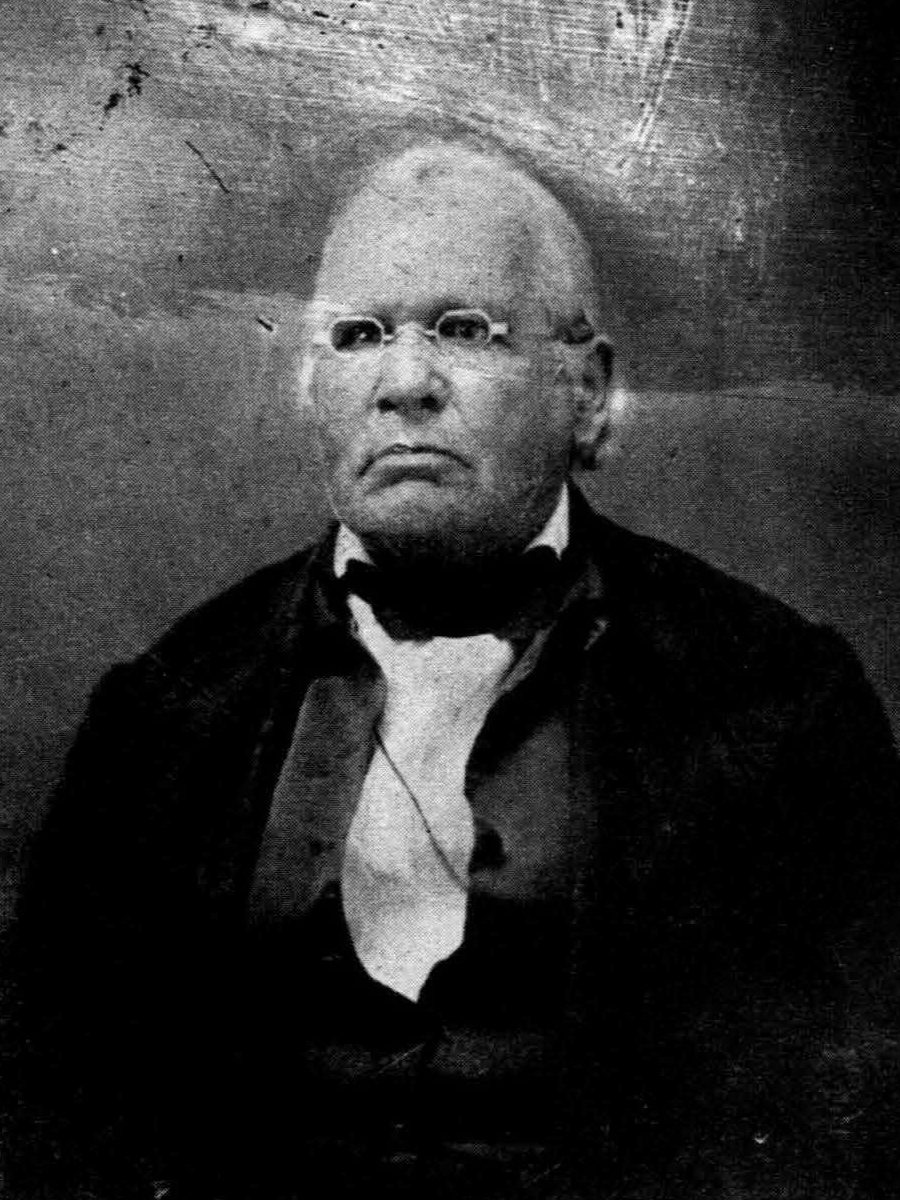
Daguerreotype by William W. Stoey c. 1840s

After leaving office, Ritner settled on a farm in Cumberland County. He suffered from cataracts, and surgery in 1839 restored the sight in his right eye, though he remained blind in his left.

With the end of the Anti-Masonic Party, Ritner actively supported the Whigs. In 1849 newly elected Whig President Zachary Taylor nominated Ritner for the post of Director of the United States Mint, then in Philadelphia. Taylor died before the nomination was acted on, so Ritner was never confirmed.

Ritner joined the Republican Party when it was founded in the mid-1850s, and was a delegate to the 1856 Republican National Convention.

== Death and interment ==
He died on October 16, 1869, and was buried at Mount Rock Cemetery in Mount Rock, Pennsylvania.

== Legacy ==
Governor Ritner has a residence hall named in his honor on the University Park campus of Penn State. Ritner Street in Philadelphia is also named in his honor.

In 1938, the state of Pennsylvania dedicated the Governor Ritner Highway, which connects Carlisle and Shippensburg along Route 11 in Cumberland County.

== See also ==
- Speaker of the Pennsylvania House of Representatives

Party political offices
First	Anti-Masonic nominee for Governor of Pennsylvania; 1829, 1832, 1835, 1838	Succeeded by None
Political offices
Preceded by George Wolf	Governor of Pennsylvania; 1835–1839	Succeeded by David R. Porter
