= 1841 Pennsylvania gubernatorial election =

- October 12, 1841
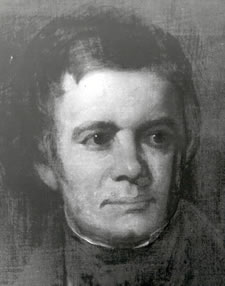

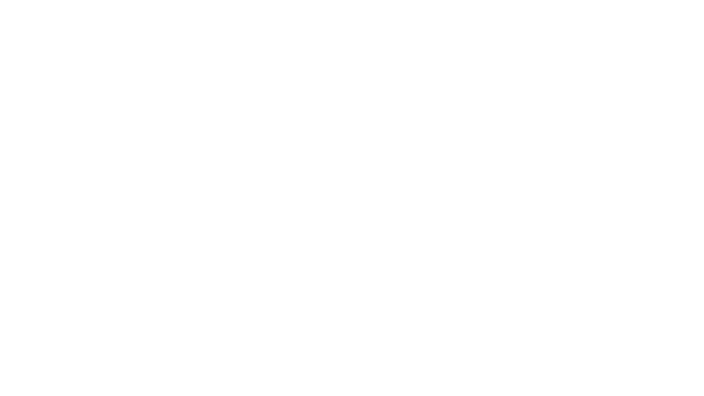
Nominee	David R. Porter	John Banks
Party	Democratic	Whig
Popular vote	136,504	113,473
Percentage	54.44%	45.25%
- County Results; Porter: 50–60% 60–70% 70–80% 80–90% Banks: 50–60% 60–70% 70–80%
Governor before election
David R. Porter
Democratic
Elected Governor
David R. Porter
Democratic

The 1841 Pennsylvania gubernatorial election was between two candidates. Incumbent Governor David R. Porter ran for the Democratic Party, and defeated John Banks.

== Results ==
Pennsylvania gubernatorial election, 1841
Party	Candidate	Votes	%
Democratic	David R. Porter (incumbent)	136,504	54.44
Whig	John Banks	113,473	45.25
Liberty	Francis Julius LeMoyne	763	0.30
N/A	Others	23	0.01
Total votes		250,763	100.00
