= 1844 Pennsylvania gubernatorial election =

- October 9, 1844
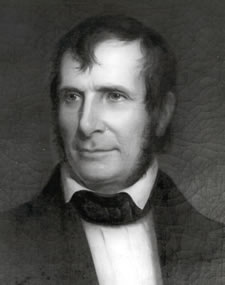

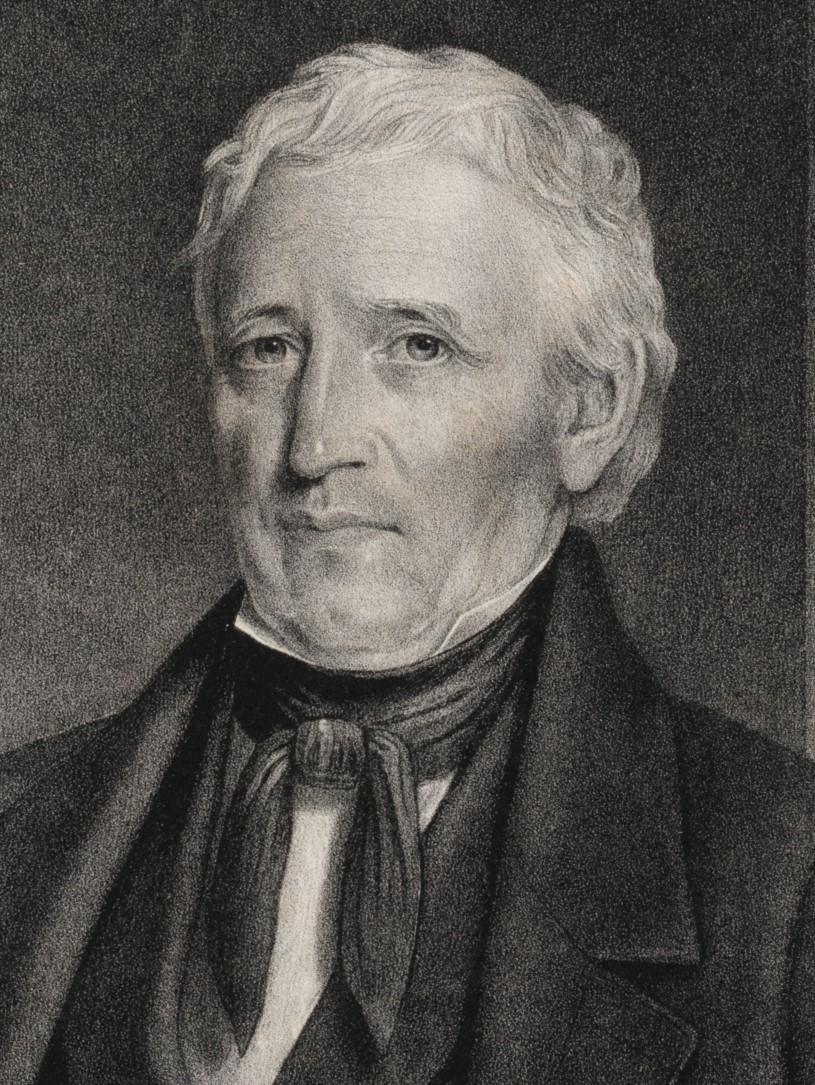
Nominee	Francis R. Shunk	Joseph Markle
Party	Democratic	Whig
Popular vote	160,322	156,040
Percentage	50.27%	48.93%
- County Results Shunk: 40–50% 50–60% 60–70% 70–80% 80–90% Markle: 40–50% 50–60% 60–70% 70–80% Unknown/No Vote
Governor before election
David R. Porter
Democratic
Elected Governor
Francis R. Shunk
Democratic

The 1844 Pennsylvania gubernatorial election occurred on October 9, 1844. Incumbent Democratic governor David R. Porter was not a candidate for re-election. Democratic candidate Francis R. Shunk defeated Whig candidate Joseph Markle to become Governor of Pennsylvania. This was the last time until 2022 that Democrats won more than two gubernatorial elections in a row in Pennsylvania.

== Results ==
Pennsylvania gubernatorial election, 1844
Party	Candidate	Votes	%
Democratic	Francis R. Shunk	160,322	50.27
Whig	Joseph Markle	156,040	48.93
Liberty	Francis Julius LeMoyne	2,566	0.81
N/A	Others	4	0.00
Total votes		318,932	100.00
