= Buckshot War =

1838 post-election civil unrest in Pennsylvania

Coordinates: 40.26446°N 76.88352°W

The Buckshot War was the outbreak of unrest in Harrisburg, Pennsylvania that transpired after the Pennsylvania gubernatorial and legislative elections in 1838 when both the Whig and Democratic parties claimed control over the Pennsylvania House of Representatives.

== The election of 1838 ==
After being elected governor of Pennsylvania in 1835, Anti-Masonic and Whig candidate Joseph Ritner served a successful term. With the cooperation of his unofficial advisor Thaddeus Stevens and Secretary of Commonwealth Thomas H. Burrowes, Ritner used Public Works as an instrument of political patronage, providing thousands of jobs. Thus it came as a shock to Whigs and Anti-Masons that Ritner was defeated for re-election by the Democratic Party candidate David Rittenhouse Porter. The campaign was considered very bitter, with Porter winning by a slim majority of 5,496 in a total vote of 250,146. This election was significant in regards to financial patronage as, if the sitting governor and his party could gain control both houses of the legislature, they would have the ability to control all appointments at a state level. The Whigs and Anti-Masons set out to contest Porter's election; having already gained a majority in the Pennsylvania Senate, they only needed to secure a majority in the House of Representatives to further their aims.

=== The Whig returns ===
In order to secure the majority in the House of Representatives, Burrowes, who was also the Chairman of the Whig Committee, used claims made by Charles J. Ingersoll to maneuver a tactical plan. Ingersoll, a Democrat, was defeated in Congress and blamed his defeat on Whig frauds in the Northern Liberties District (Now known simply as Northern Liberties) in Philadelphia. He was able to persuade the Board of Return judges to disregard all 5000 votes from that polling place. The seven Whig judges on the Board, however, met separately and made certificates to their party candidates in Congress and in the state legislature. They recognized the four Whig candidates in the Northern Liberties District, which in turn would give the majority of the House of Representatives to the Whigs. This majority was crucial to the party. With it they would have control of both branches of the Legislature. This would allow them the ability to control all appointments if Porter's election was successfully contested. When the returns were received by Burrowes, he immediately claimed them as the legal and official returns and sent them to the House of Representatives.

== The night of December 4, 1838 ==
=== In the House of Representatives ===
The House of Representatives met on the night of December 4, where the Clerk of the House, Francis R. Shunk began with the usual roll call. However, after the names of the members from Philadelphia were read, Charles Pray, a claimed member from Philadelphia, said that the four members from the Northern Liberties District were not legally elected. He later produced his own set of election returns, which had been legally certified. The Whigs demanded that the names of the four Philadelphia members be given their seats. On the other side, the Democrats claimed that Burrowes had prepared legal returns that benefited only his party. In response to the two sets of returns being produced, Thaddeus Stevens, the leader of the Whig and Anti-Masonic party in Legislature, made a motion that the House proceed to elect a speaker. Amidst the confusion the two bodies elected a speaker, with the Democrats electing William Hopkins on a roll call and the party behind Stevens electing Thomas S.S Cunningham by a viva voce vote. After both parties adjourned until the next day, Stevens's party went to the Senate, with a Whig majority.

=== Unrest in the Senate ===
While at the Senate, the atmosphere became that of negativity towards Stevens and his party. While organizing the chamber, a contested seat caught the attention of the large crowd surrounding the ground. Charles Brown, a Democrat, contested the seat of James Hanna, a Whig, on the account of gross fraud. However, the speaker of the Senate Charles B. Penrose admitted Hanna to his seat, which subsequently outraged Democrats in the crowd for not recognizing or legitimatizing Brown's allegation. It was claimed that the crowd could be heard shouting, "Kill Burrowes!", "Kill Stevens!", "Kill Penrose!" After much aggravation, the crowd broke through the bar of the Senate and headed towards the three Whigs. It was at this time that they had already escaped through the back window of the Senate, in fear of their safety. It is believed that the riot was led by the infamous "Balty" Sowers, a gang member from Philadelphia. Democrats denied any involvement with Sowers, however, a variety of sources state that his mission was to assassinate Stevens, Burrowes and Penrose- all avid Whig enthusiasts. Hence, suspicions arose around whether Democrats in Pennsylvania were trying to sabotage their opponents.

== Militia and aftermath ==
After the commotion in the Senate Chamber, both parties still had no quorum, and remained at odds. The party under Stevens was forced to stay at Wilson's Hotel for their meetings, and out of fear continued aggravation, Governor Ritner demanded militia be brought in to the Capitol. In the fourth article of the United States Constitution, it declares that every state in the Union will be provided aid against domestic violence. Thus, Ritner looked at a federal level for assistance. He asked federal troop leader Captain Sumner to bring his troops to Harrisburg, however, the Captain refused on the grounds that the commotion was strictly a result of the political issues belonging to the state. When Ritner tried again to insist for help, this time from President Martin Van Buren himself, he was once again refused, with the president stating that interfering was beyond the federal government's legal duties and would be considered improper as it would be favouring one political party over the other. In addition, the riots had not resulted in any sort of physical violence and consequently did not appear to be a threat to the welfare of Pennsylvania's citizens. Just as in the Dorr Rebellion, when President John Tyler refused to send troops to Rhode Island after the insurrection led by Thomas Wilson Dorr, the federal government refused to intervene in the Buckshot War because the domestic violence did not seem to be of a great enough threat, and therefore should be dealt with by the state itself. Thus, the Buckshot War was not just a political issue within its boundaries, but it also addressed the role that the federal government played in less-threatening state political issues, which was very minimal.

After being denied federal troops, Ritner then ordered the state militia under the command of General Robert Patterson to control any violent mobs. Without being supplied any proper ammunition from federal sources, Ritner ordered that the state troops be given thirteen rounds of buckshot cartridges, giving the incident its name. His plan was disrupted, however, when a group of citizens under the command of General Diller, member of the Committee of Safety, took control of the militia's arsenal and began using it against the Governor and his supporters. It was at this time that support for Ritner and Stevens had declined. The proprietor of Wilson's hotel closed his door to Cunningham's party, with three of the party's members- Chester Butler, John Montelius and John Sturdevant, leaving later that week to go to Hopkins's party. As a result of this switch, the Hopkins party now had a quorum, and slowly the latter party declined, with only the four members from Philadelphia and Thaddeus Stevens claiming its legality. On December 25, 1838, the Senate recognized that the Hopkins party was the legal body of the House of Representatives, subsequently ending the Buckshot War.

The Buckshot War increased Democratic support in Pennsylvania, which is reflected in the Pennsylvania gubernatorial election of 1841. During this election, Porter was re-elected over the Whig candidate, John Banks. The election demonstrates the sentiments that the state citizens felt over the controversial events in December 1838. In Burrowes's plan to use a second set of returns made by Whig judges and Ritner's call for state militia to protect his party, both men did what they could to protect the interests of their own party, rather than thinking about the state citizens as a whole. As a result of their un-democratic ideals, the gubernatorial election reflects how citizens decided to turn their support to the opposing party.
