= 1847 Pennsylvania gubernatorial election =

- October 12, 1847
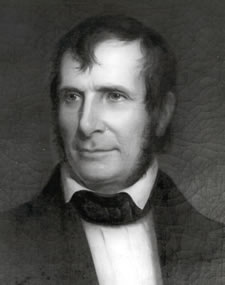

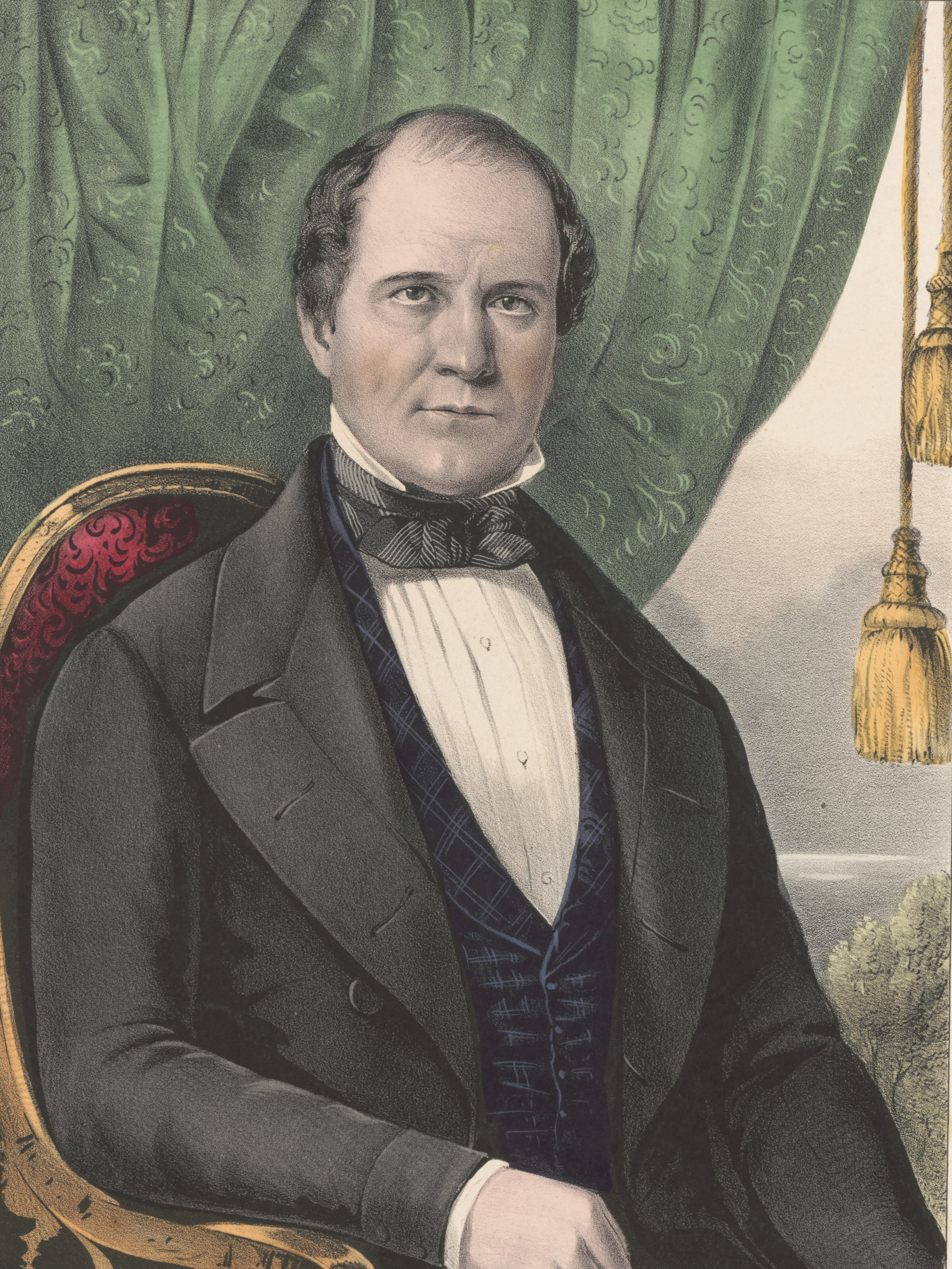
Nominee	Francis R. Shunk	James Irvin
Party	Democratic	Whig
Popular vote	146,081	128,148
Percentage	50.84%	44.60%
- County Results; Shunk: 40–50% 50–60% 60–70% 70–80% 80–90% Irvin: 40–50% 50–60% 60–70% 70–80%
Governor before election
Francis R. Shunk
Democratic
Elected Governor
Francis R. Shunk
Democratic

The 1847 Pennsylvania gubernatorial election occurred on October 12, 1847. Incumbent Democratic governor Francis R. Shunk defeated Whig candidate James Irvin to win re-election.

== Results ==
Pennsylvania gubernatorial election, 1847
Party	Candidate	Votes	%
Democratic	Francis R. Shunk (incumbent)	146,081	50.84
Whig	James Irvin	128,148	44.60
Know Nothing	Eman C. Reigart	11,247	3.91
Liberty	Francis Julius LeMoyne	1,861	0.65
Write-in	Abijah Morrison	3	0.00
N/A	Others	3	0.00
Total votes		287,343	100.00
