= Francis Julius LeMoyne =

American physician

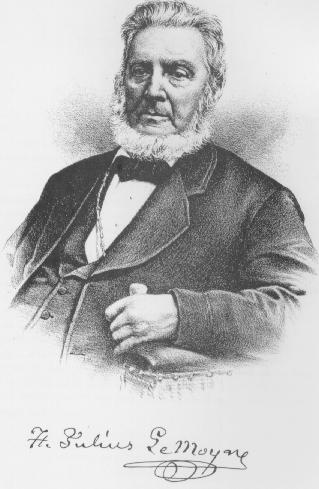
- F. Julius LeMoyne, M.D.
- Born: September 4, 1798; Washington, Pennsylvania, United States
- Died: October 14, 1879 (aged 81); Washington, Pennsylvania, United States
- Resting place: LeMoyne Crematory
- Education: Washington College; M.D. University of Pennsylvania School of Medicine matriculant and Jefferson Medical College graduate
- Occupations: Medical Doctor, Philanthropist
- Title: Dr.
- Spouse: Madeleine Romaine Bureau
- Parent: John Julius LeMoyne (father)

Francis Julius LeMoyne (September 4, 1798 – October 14, 1879) was a 19th-century American medical doctor and philanthropist from Washington, Pennsylvania. Responsible for creating the first crematory in the United States, he was also an abolitionist, founder of Washington's first public library (known as Citizen's Library), co-founder of the Washington Female Seminary, and an instrumental benefactor to the LeMoyne Normal and Commercial School (now LeMoyne-Owen College), to which he made a $20,000 (~$436,452 in 2024) donation in 1870.

== Career ==
LeMoyne was the son of Nancy McCuly and John Julius LeMoyne.

He graduated from Washington College (now Washington & Jefferson College) in 1815 and Jefferson Medical College in 1826 but first matriculated in 1821 as member of University of Pennsylvania School of Medicine's Class of 1825.

LeMoyne was active in the abolitionist movement in Pennsylvania, serving as a manager of the American Anti-Slavery Society from 1837 to 1840, and later as vice president of the American and Foreign Anti-Slavery Society. He was an agent of the Underground Railroad. His opposition to slavery led him to leave his New School Presbyterian church. LeMoyne was nominated for vice president in the 1840 United States presidential election by an abolitionist meeting at Warsaw, New York, but declined. He subsequently ran for governor of Pennsylvania on the Liberty Party ticket in 1841, 1845, and 1847, without success. He supported Gerrit Smith in the 1848 United States presidential election, but afterward joined the more moderate Free Soil Party. He joined the Republican Party following the collapse of the Free Soilers in 1854.

== Death ==
On October 14, 1879, Julius LeMoyne died of a heart attack at Washington, Pennsylvania, United States at the age 81. His body was cremated at LeMoyne Crematory.

== Crematory ==
Deducing that decomposing bodies in local cemeteries were contaminating the water supplies and making the citizens sick, Dr. Lemoyne set out to build the first crematory in the United States. The crematory was finished in 1876 on his own land, perched atop a location known locally as Gallow's Hill. The first cremation took place on December 6, 1876. In 1901, after 41 more cremations were performed (with Dr. LeMoyne being the third), the crematory was closed.

Today, the structure can be found in the same location off of South Main Street.

== Lemoyne House ==
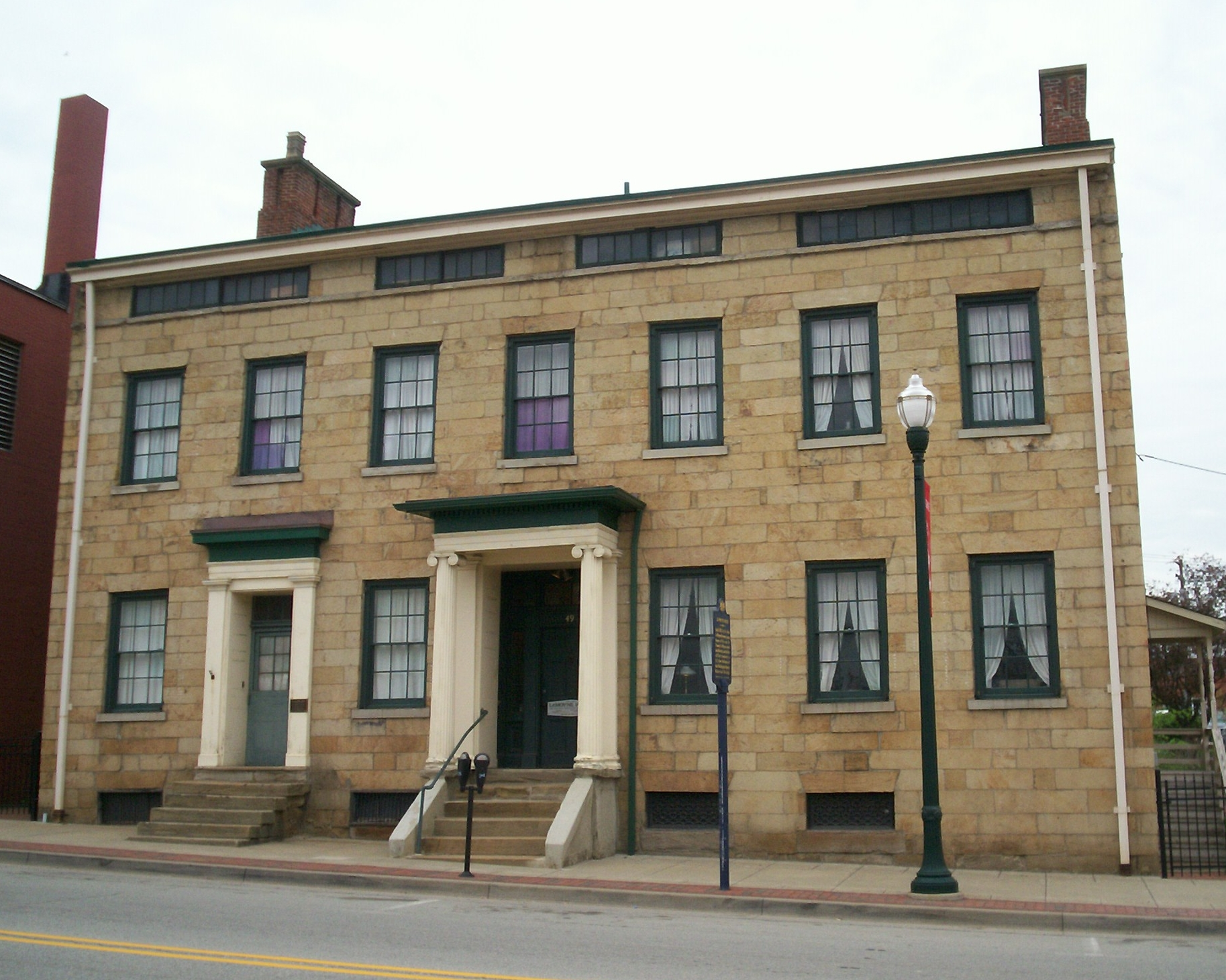
LeMoyne House in Washington, Pennsylvania

The LeMoyne house, built by father John Julius LeMoyne in 1812, was a stop on the Underground Railroad. It was Pennsylvania's first of six National Historic Landmarks of the Underground Railroad to be registered. It still stands today at 49 East Maiden Street, near the campus of Washington & Jefferson College, where it has been converted into a museum. The house also serves as the center of the Washington County Historical Society.

== Marriage and Descendants ==
LeMoyne married Madeleine Romaine Bureau. Their descendants include:

- John Valcoulon LeMoyne (17 Nov 1828 - 27 Jul 1918), U.S. Congressman, married Julia Nancy Murray (10 May 1828 - 17 Jun 1902), daughter of Magnus Miller Murray, former Mayor of Pittsburgh and his wife Mary Wilkins (23 Oct 1788 - 16 Feb 1872), daughter of Quartermaster General John Wilkins Jr. Their children included:
  - Francis Julius Lemoyne (1854 - 26 Feb 1937), who late in life married Mary I. Clark (Dec 1873 - 9 Jul 1973), daughter of George Dorsey Clark (1844-1900) and Alice Ann Linthicum (1848-1929); no issue.
  - William M. Lemoyne (29 Jun 1855 - 16 May 1931), lawyer, married about 1890 to Gertrude M. McKennan (11 Feb 1856 - 11 Nov 1935); no issue.
  - Madeleine Romaine LeMoyne (b. 14 Nov 1856), married 21 Jul 1890 to Charles Ellis Ellicott and had issue:
    - Charles Ellis Ellicott Jr. (1892-1988), married Ann K. Murray and had issue:
      - Nancy Ellicott (b. abt. 1921 (possibly 22 Oct 1920 - 1 Feb 2005 and married twice))
      - Dr. Charles Ellis Ellicott III (23 Feb 1923 - 25 Dec 2008), married Marjorie Foote (2 Nov 1923 - 3 Oct 1975)
      - Madeleine LeMoyne Ellicott (19 Mar 1926 - 7 May 1995), married Alan D. Chesney
    - Dr. Valcoulon Le Moyne Ellicott (15 Nov 1893 - 10 Feb 1983), married Mary Purnell Gould (28 Sep 1897 - 30 Nov 2006), daughter of lawyer Clarendon Ivan Theodore Gould (10 Nov 1862 - 23 Apr 1948) and Grace Purnell (7 Jun 1870 - 21 Dec 1951), and had issue:
      - John Valcoulon Le Moyne Ellicott (b. 26 May 1929), married Mary Lou Ulery (1931-1995)
      - Jacqueline Ellicott (b. abt. 1931)
      - Clarendon "Don" Gould Ellicott (b. abt. 1934)
  - Mary Ann LeMoyne (Aug 1858 - 17 Jan 1937), married George Dole Forrest and had issue:
    - Julie Murray Forrest (5 May 1894 - 15 Apr 1990), on 25 Sep 1920 married banker Spottswood Page Nelson (13 Jul 1896 - 20 Apr 1980) and had issue:
    - Julie Murray Nelson (b. abt. 1924), married Edward Monroe Williams and had issue.
    - Spotswood Page Nelson (b. 11 Dec 1925)
    - Katharine Forrest Kendrick (4 June 1888 - 29 December 1989)
  - Louis Valcoulon LeMoyne (4 Jan 1860 - 1928), landscape architect, author
  - Julia LeMoyne (1 Jul 1863 - 6 Aug 1953), who married William Brown McIlvaine and had issue.
  - Katharine Le Moyne (b. 19 Sep 1866), married Janon Fisher (b. Sep 1837) and had issue:
    - Janon Fisher Jr. (4 Jan 1898 - 26 Mar 1979), married Margie James (4 Jul 1900 - 6 May 1987), daughter of lumber merchant Norman James, and had issue.
    - Katharine Le Moyne Fisher Jr. (b. 21 Mar 1900)
  - Romaine LeMoyne (1870-1968), who married Austin McLanahan (31 Oct 1871 - 3 Apr 1946). They are ancestors of actress Julie Bowen.
- Anne LeMoyne, married coal dealer Vachel Harding. Their children included:
  - Charles Vachel Harding (15 Oct 1856 - 19 Apr 1947), married Belle Galbraith (b. 1858), then remarried in 1886 to Amanda Virginia Hupp by whom he had issue:
    - Carolene H. Harding (25 Sep 1887 - 13 Apr 1960)
    - Madeleine S. Harding (b. 22 Jan 1891)
  - Madaline LeMoyne Harding (b. abt. 1859)
  - Annie LeMoyne Harding (26 Mar 1864 - 30 Dec 1937)
- Romaine LeMoyne (Apr 1831 - 17 Feb 1922), married Nicholas King Wade (1823-1899). Their children included:
  - Madeleine Romaine Wade (Jun 1855 - 2 Dec 1925), married investment broker Robert Warner Poindexter (1849-1927). Their children were:
    - Robert Wade Poindexter (4 Mar 1887 - 15 Mar 1943), manufacturing chemist and plant breeder, on 5 Feb 1916 married Irene M. Mersereau and had issue.
    - Romaine LeMoyne Poindexter (2 Jul 1889 - 26 Aug 1977), no issue.
  - Susan Wade (1859-1945), married Ernest Pryce Mitchell (1862 - 5 Feb 1947), no issue.
  - Julia Frances Wade (1861 - 25 Mar 1944), no issue.
  - William Nicholas Wade M.D. (1863-1917), married, no issue.
- Jane LeMoyne (24 Feb 1834 - 3 Sep 1917), married about 1887 to Prof. James Snodgrass Simonton (20 Mar 1829 - 27 Dec 1921), elder brother of Ashbel Green Simonton. No issue.
- Julius LeMoyne (29 Aug 1836 - 2 Apr 1911), President and Treasurer of the Washington County Fire Insurance Co., on 4 Mar 1862 he married Annie H. Kuhn (b. Mar 1839), daughter of Adam Kuhn (8 Mar 1801 - 27 Oct 1872), a bank president, and his wife Priscilla Wheeler (28 Jan 1805 - 27 May 1850). Their six children include:
  - Rose M. LeMoyne (b. abt. 1866), who on 11 Oct 1902 married George M. Kelley M.D. No issue.
  - Francis Julius LeMoyne (5 Jan 1867 - 3 Aug 1953), married on 7 June 1899 to Catharine Murray Guthrie (29 Dec 1872 - 5 Jan 1940) (daughter of Robert Walker Guthrie and Priscilla Sellers), granddaughter of John Brandon Guthrie, former Mayor of Pittsburgh, and niece of George W. Guthrie, future Mayor of Pittsburgh and Ambassador to Japan. They had one daughter:
    - Marcia LeMoyne (16 May 1904 - 12 Sep 1975)
  - Anna (Annie) Kuhn LeMoyne (Mar 1873 - 22 Jan 1919), married financial clerk Joseph C. Baird (18 Jun 1864 - 26 Oct 1950). Their son was:
    - John Julius Baird (16 Jun 1907 - Aug 1983), musician, married Margaret (b. abt. 1910) and had issue.
  - Mary LeMoyne (about 1874 - before 1900)
  - Madelaine Romaine LeMoyne (Nov 1877 - 17 Feb 1928), who on 10 Jun 1915 married Thomas Rush Alexander Jr. No issue.
- Dr. Francis "Frank" Julius LeMoyne Jr. (4 Apr 1839 - 1 Dec 1913), Lucretia O. Lewis (20 Jun 1849 - 21 Jul 1925), daughter of Abraham Kirkpatrick "Kirk" Lewis and Mary Orth.
  - Romaine LeMoyne (1882 - 1970) married Dr. Frederic Tremaine "Josh" Billings (1873 - 1933)
    - Dr. Frederic Tremaine "Josh" Billings, Jr. (1912 - )
    - Lucretia Billings Fisher (1913 - )
    - Kirk LeMoyne "Lem" Billings (1916 - May 28, 1981)
- Madeleine LeMoyne (8 May 1843 - 26 Oct 1943), remained single until at the age of 63 on 2 Mar 1907 in California she married George W. Reed. No issue.

In episode 2 of season 8 of the genealogy television show Who_Do_You_Think_You_Are, a short biography is presented, and actress Julie Bowen is shown to be a direct descendant.
