= Augustus Lutheran Church =

Historic church in Pennsylvania, United States

- U.S. National Register of Historic Places
- U.S. National Historic Landmark
- Pennsylvania state historical marker
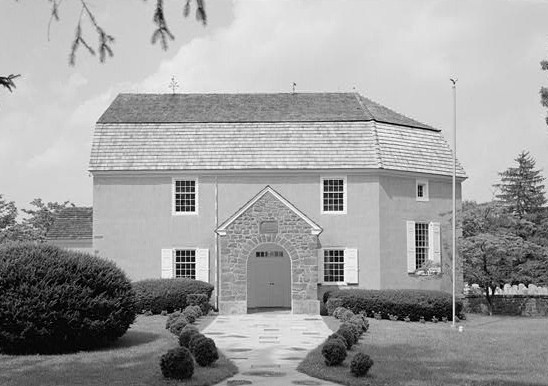
- Augustus Lutheran Church

- Location within Pennsylvania Location within the United States
- Location: 717 Main Street, Trappe, Pennsylvania
- Coordinates: 40.2019°N 75.4805°W
- Built: 1743; 283 years ago
- Architect: Heinrich Melchior Muhlenburg
- NRHP reference No.: 67000019

Significant dates
- Added to NRHP: December 24, 1967; 58 years ago
- Designated NHL: December 24, 1967; 58 years ago
- Designated PHMC: September 3, 1947; 79 years ago

Augustus Lutheran Church is a historic church and Lutheran congregation at 717 West Main Street in Trappe, Pennsylvania. Consecrated in 1745, it is the oldest extant Lutheran church building in the United States, and was founded primarily by Pennsylvania Germans. During the American Revolutionary War, the church served as a field hospital and provisions center for George Washington’s Continental Army during the Philadelphia campaign. It continues to be used by the founding congregation for services on Christmas Eve and during the summer. Augustus Lutheran was designated a National Historic Landmark in 1967.

== History ==
The Trappe area was settled in 1717 by Germans who worshipped informally or under itinerant preachers until the arrival of Heinrich Melchior Mühlenberg in 1742. Their first church, which cost 200 pounds sterling, was designed by Mühlenberg. All of the interior fittings were fabricated from local materials, including the pulpit, which is made of American black walnut. The building is constructed of red sandstone (now faced with stucco); the east end of the building is formed into a three-sided apse. Above the south entrance is a date stone inscribed in Latin with the names of the church's founders, including Henry Melchior Muhlenberg, Frederick Marsteller, John Nicholas Cressman, Anthony Heilman (Hallman), Jacob Miller, Henry Haas, and George Kebner. The roof is framed with oak rafters and covered in cedar shingles. The cemetery at the rear of the building contains tombstones dating from 1736 and earlier, as well as the graves of Muhlenberg, his wife Anna Maria Weiser, and their daughter Mary Swaine and son, Continental Army General Peter Muhlenberg.

Although the shell of the building was finished in 1743, the church was not consecrated until 1745. It was named after August Hermann Francke, founder of the Francke Foundations in Halle, Germany, a center of Lutheran Pietism where Henry Melchior Muhlenberg had trained. During the American Revolution, the building was used as a camping site and hospital for the Continental Army. A monument at the west end of the church commemorates unknown Revolutionary War soldiers buried in the cemetery.

By the mid-1800s, the congregation had outgrown the old building, and a new brick church was built. This structure was consecrated in 1852, whereupon the old building became used for Sunday School classes. A freak thunderstorm in 1860 severely damaged the roof; however, it was decided to restore the building rather than tear it down. A cast-iron stove was then added to the previously unheated building. Renovations in the 1920s restored the building to its original appearance. In the late 1950s, services were once again held in the Old Church in the summer and on Christmas Eve, a tradition which continues to the present day. A digital organ was placed in the original organ case in the early 1990s.

The church was declared a National Historic Landmark on December 24, 1967.

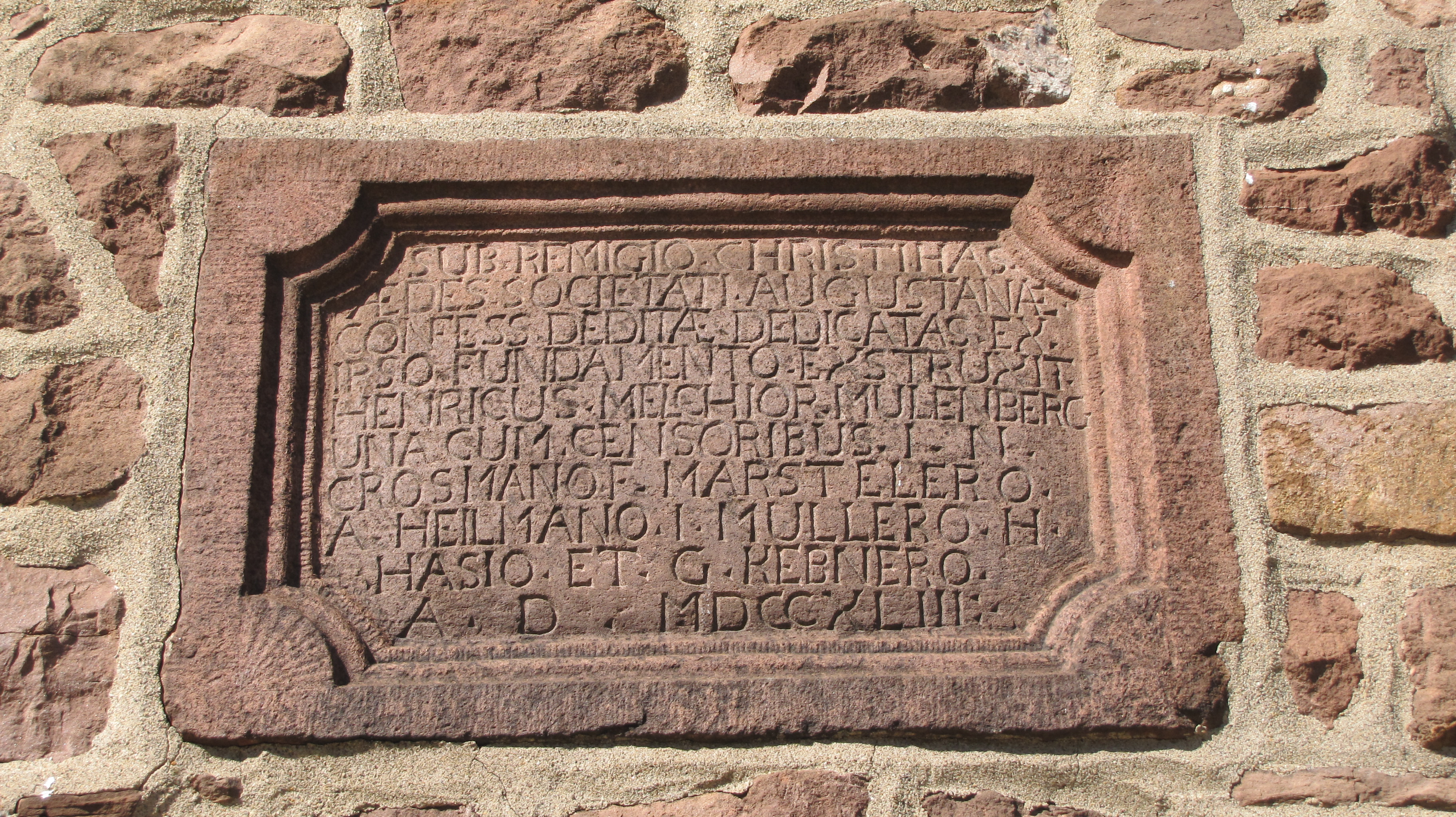
Datestone in Latin

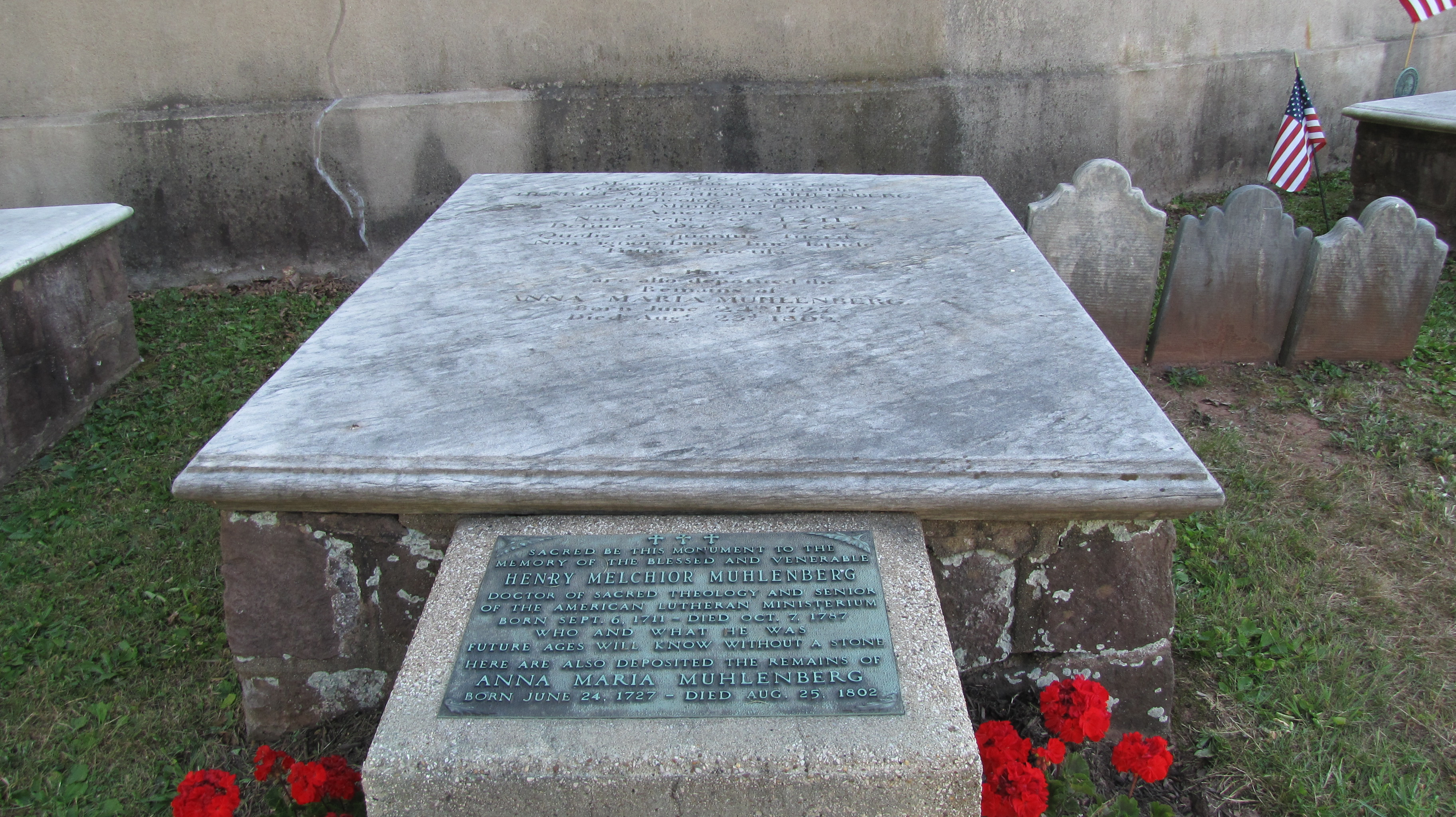
Grave of Henry M. Muhlenberg

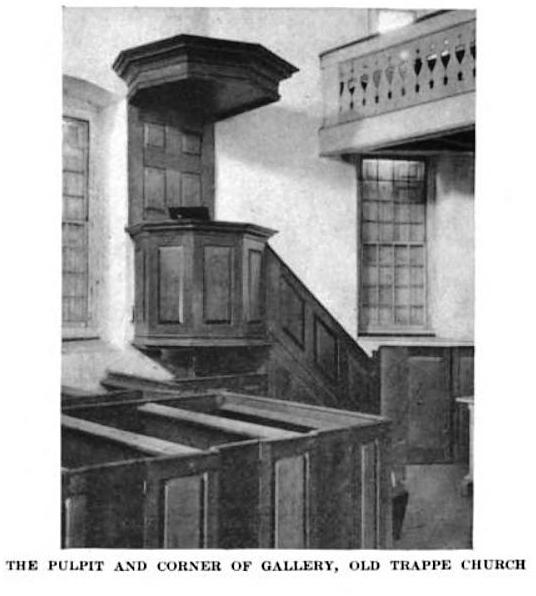
Pulpit in 1919

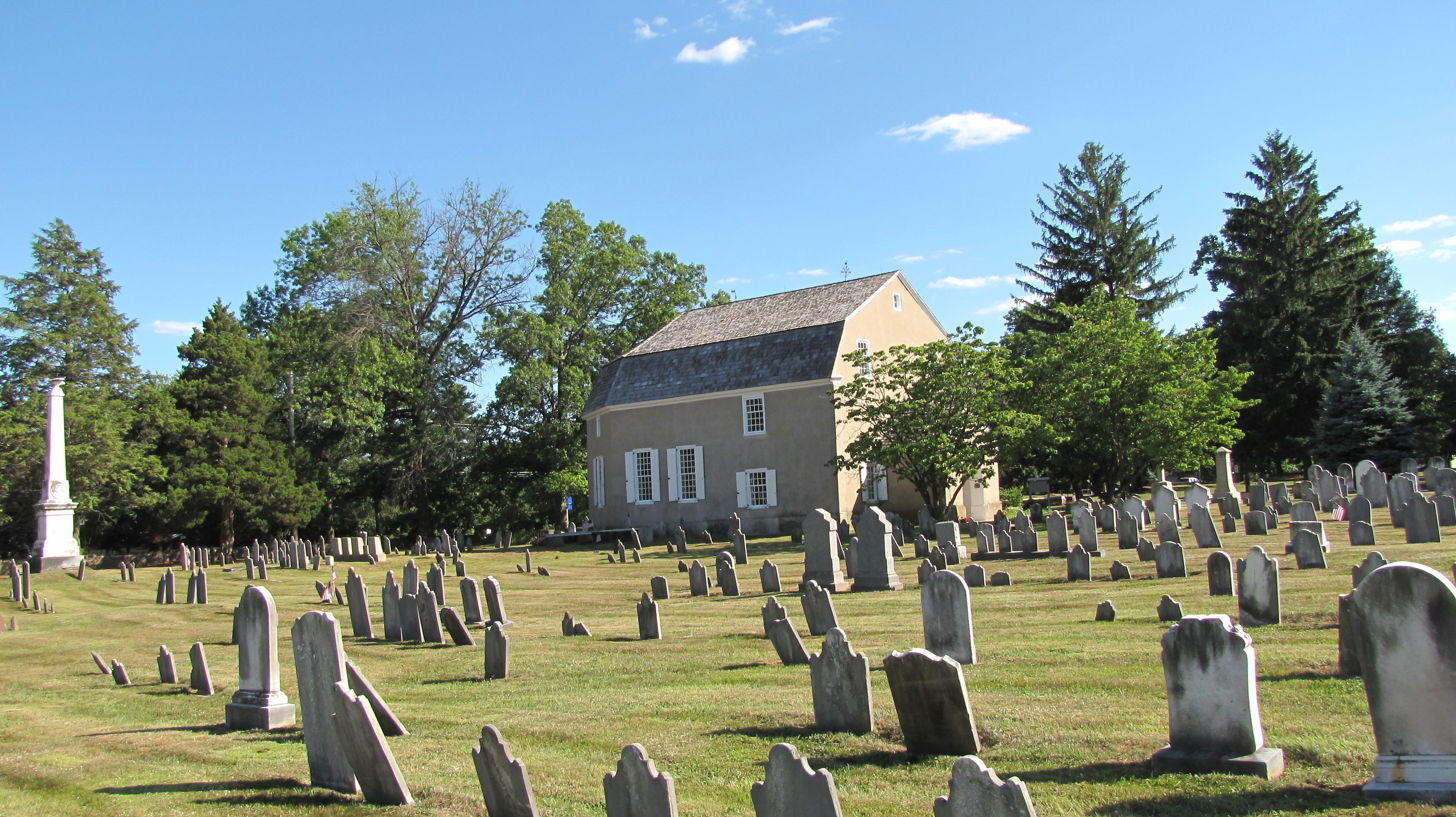
Cemetery and church

== See also ==
- List of the oldest buildings in Pennsylvania
- List of National Historic Landmarks in Pennsylvania
- National Register of Historic Places listings in Montgomery County, Pennsylvania
