= Trappe, Pennsylvania =

Borough in Pennsylvania, US

Borough of Trappe Drapp
- Borough
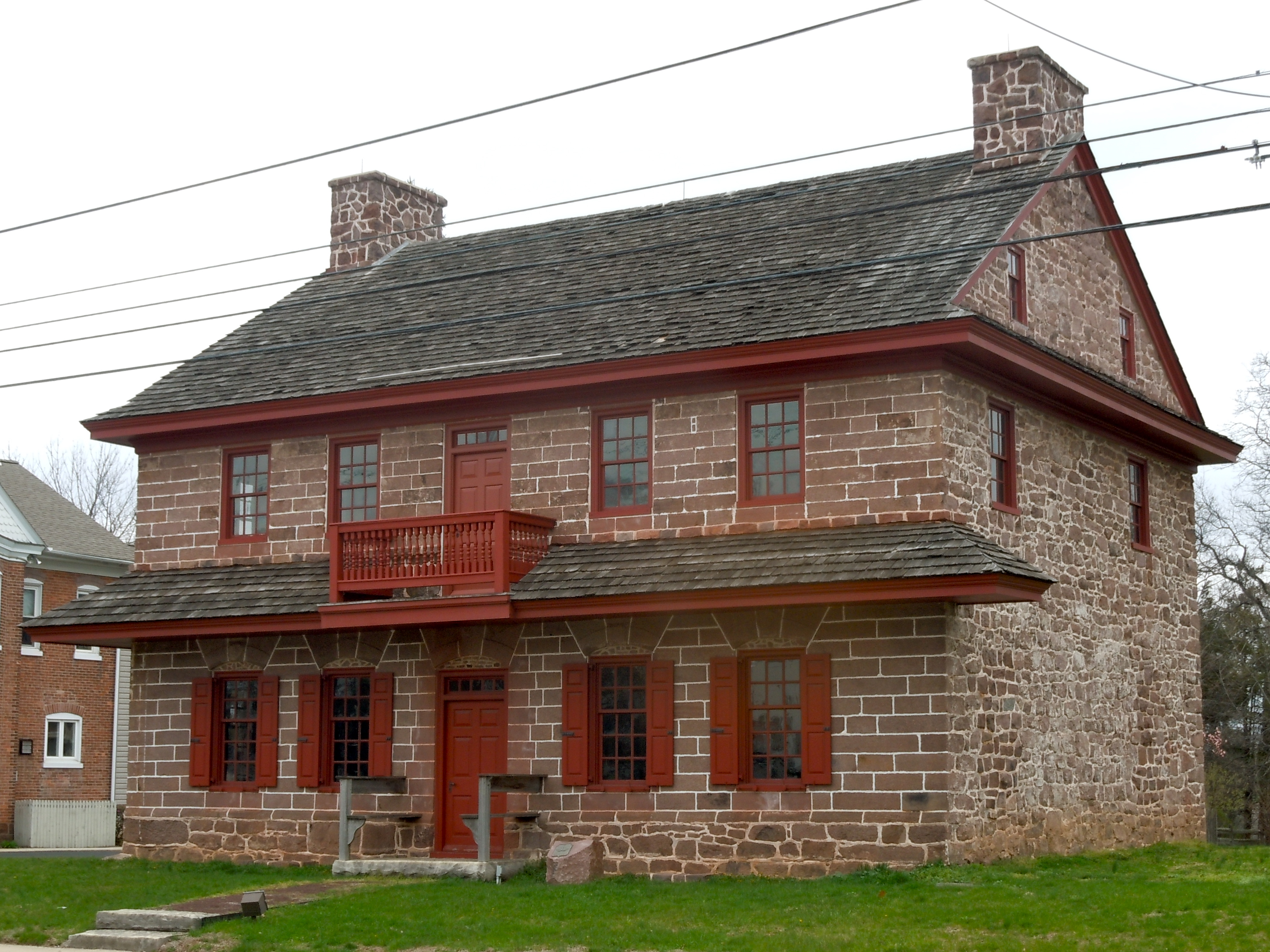
- Muhlenberg House, c. 1720–1787

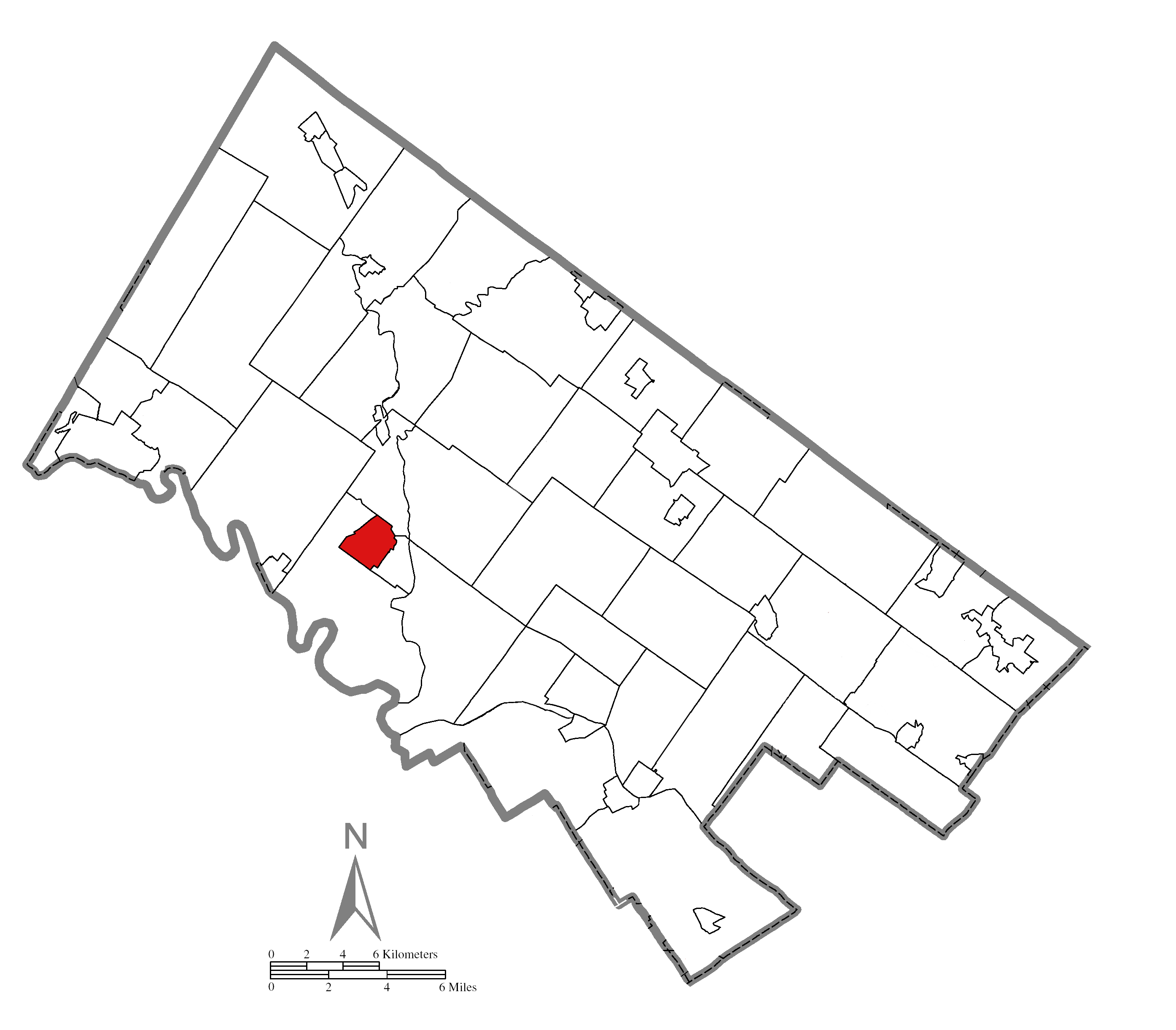
- Location of Trappe in Montgomery County, Pennsylvania

- Location of Trappe in Pennsylvania Trappe (the United States)
- Coordinates: 40°12′N 75°29′W
- Country: United States
- State: Pennsylvania
- County: Montgomery

Government
  - Type: Council–manager
  - Mayor: Heather Blumenthal

Area
  - Total: 2.06 sq mi (5.34 km^{2})
  - Land: 2.06 sq mi (5.34 km^{2})
  - Water: 0 sq mi (0.00 km^{2})
- Elevation: 272 ft (83 m)

Population (2010)
  - Total: 3,509
  - Estimate (2019): 3,725
  - Density: 1,807.4/sq mi (697.84/km^{2})
- Time zone: UTC-5 (EST)
  - Summer (DST): UTC-4 (EDT)
- ZIP Code: 19426
- Area codes: 610 and 484
- FIPS code: 42-77304
- Website: trappeborough.com

Trappe (Pennsylvania German: Drapp) is a borough in Montgomery County, Pennsylvania, United States. As of the 2020 census, Trappe had a population of 4,002. Augustus Lutheran Church, built in 1743, is the oldest unchanged Lutheran church building in the United States in continuous use by the same congregation. It has been designated a National Historic Landmark.

== Geography ==
Trappe is located at 40°12′N 75°29′W (40.197111, -75.475244).

According to the United States Census Bureau, the borough has a total area of 2.1 square miles (5.4 km^{2}), all land.

== Schools ==
Trappe falls within the boundaries of the Perkiomen Valley School District. South Elementary school lies in the borough, as does the old Collegeville-Trappe high school.

== History ==
European migrants settled in Trappe starting in 1717 and included many German immigrants. They had landed at the port of Philadelphia and moved west, where land was available.

One of the oldest extant buildings in town is Augustus Lutheran Church. Construction of the old church began in 1743 following the arrival of Lutheran minister Henry Melchior Muhlenberg, who emigrated from Germany in 1742. After a severe storm on February 16, 1860 that damaged the colonial building, it was saved and restored by his grandson William Augustus Muhlenberg. It is the oldest unchanged Lutheran church building in the US in continuous use by the same congregation and has been designated a National Historic Landmark.

A c. 1830 building across from Augustus Lutheran Church served as the US Post Office until 1929, when operations were moved to a larger regional location. The post office/general store is now a private residence.

Trappe is also home to the Henry Melchior Muhlenberg House, which is listed on the National Register of Historic Places. The building has been restored and is operated as a museum by the Historical Society of Trappe, Collegeville, Perkiomen Valley, Inc.

The Speaker's House, home of Frederick Muhlenberg, is another historic site in Trappe that is open to the public. It is currently undergoing restoration.

== Transportation ==
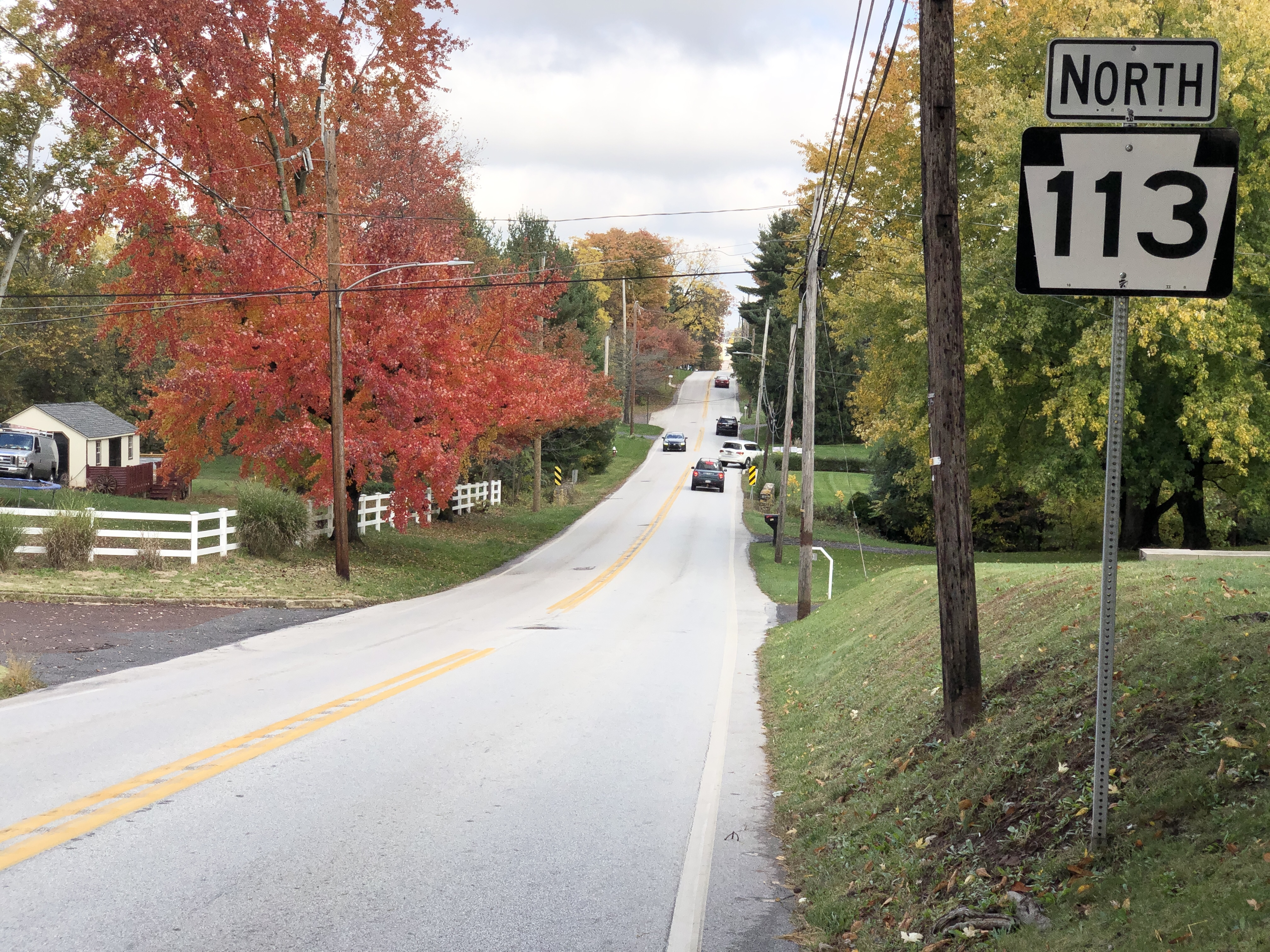
PA 113 northbound in Trappe

As of 2015 there were 14.60 miles (23.50 km) of public roads in Trappe, of which 3.68 miles (5.92 km) were maintained by the Pennsylvania Department of Transportation (PennDOT) and 10.92 miles (17.57 km) were maintained by the borough.

The main highway serving Trappe is Pennsylvania Route 113. It traverses the borough on a general northeast-southwest alignment following Third Avenue.

SEPTA provides Suburban Bus service to Trappe along Route 93, which runs between the Norristown Transportation Center in Norristown and Pottstown.

== Demographics ==
Historical population
Census	Pop.	Note	%±
1900	324		—
1910	398		22.8%
1920	412		3.5%
1930	410		−0.5%
1940	497		21.2%
1950	773		55.5%
1960	1,264		63.5%
1970	1,676		32.6%
1980	1,800		7.4%
1990	2,115		17.5%
2000	3,210		51.8%
2010	3,509		9.3%
2020	4,002		14.0%

=== 2000 census ===
As of the census of 2000, there were 3,210 people, 1,292 households, and 886 families residing in the borough. The population density was 1,547.1 inhabitants per square mile (597.3/km^{2}). There were 1,351 housing units at an average density of 651.1 per square mile (251.4/km^{2}). The racial makeup of the borough was 94.02% White, 2.40% African American, 0.22% Native American, 1.37% Asian, 0.34% from other races, and 1.65% from two or more races. Hispanic or Latino of any race were 1.18% of the population.

There were 1,292 households, out of which 32.8% had children under the age of 18 living with them, 60.0% were married couples living together, 6.3% had a female householder with no husband present, and 31.4% were non-families. 24.2% of all households were made up of individuals, and 4.9% had someone living alone who was 65 years of age or older. The average household size was 2.48 and the average family size was 3.00.

In the borough the population was spread out, with 24.7% under the age of 18, 4.5% from 18 to 24, 41.0% from 25 to 44, 19.8% from 45 to 64, and 10.0% who were 65 years of age or older. The median age was 35 years. For every 100 females there were 99.3 males. For every 100 females age 18 and over, there were 95.5 males.

The median income for a household in the borough was $67,500, and the median income for a family was $76,544. Males had a median income of $52,337 versus $37,212 for females. The per capita income for the borough was $31,281. About 0.6% of families and 0.8% of the population were below the poverty line, including none of those under the age of eighteen or sixty-five or over.

=== 2010 census ===
As of the 2010 census, 89.2% White, 3.2% Black or African American, 0.3% Native American, 4.5% Asian, and 2.0% were two or more races. 2.7% of the population were of Hispanic or Latino ancestry.

=== 2020 census ===
As of the 2020 census, Trappe had a population of 4,002. The median age was 39.9 years. 22.7% of residents were under the age of 18 and 13.7% of residents were 65 years of age or older. For every 100 females there were 90.6 males, and for every 100 females age 18 and over there were 89.2 males age 18 and over.

100.0% of residents lived in urban areas, while 0.0% lived in rural areas.

There were 1,566 households in Trappe, of which 34.8% had children under the age of 18 living in them. Of all households, 54.2% were married-couple households, 14.2% were households with a male householder and no spouse or partner present, and 25.5% were households with a female householder and no spouse or partner present. About 24.7% of all households were made up of individuals and 9.0% had someone living alone who was 65 years of age or older.

There were 1,643 housing units, of which 4.7% were vacant. The homeowner vacancy rate was 1.7% and the rental vacancy rate was 9.1%.

Racial composition as of the 2020 census
Race	Number	Percent
White	3,219	80.4%
Black or African American	186	4.6%
American Indian and Alaska Native	12	0.3%
Asian	288	7.2%
Native Hawaiian and Other Pacific Islander	0	0.0%
Some other race	87	2.2%
Two or more races	210	5.2%
Hispanic or Latino (of any race)	182	4.5%

== Politics and government ==
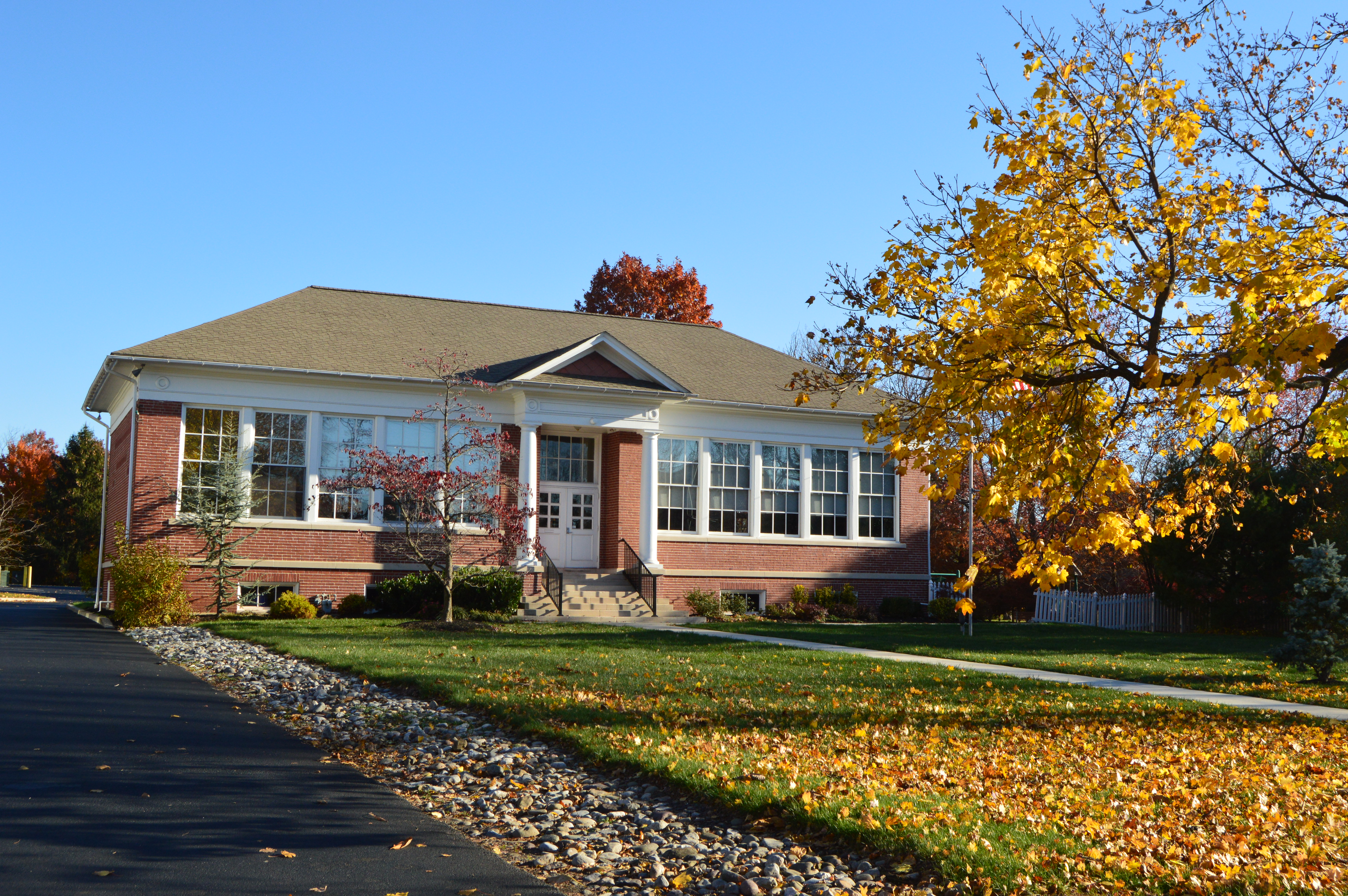
Trappe Borough Hall

Trappe has a borough manager form of government with a mayor and a seven-member borough council. The mayor is Heather Blumenthal. The current borough council members are Liz Cady (president), Ben Ratkiewicz (vice-president), Scott Martin, Mallory Perlin, Stuart Strauss, Heather Gustafson and Eric Fabiszewski.

The borough is part of the 4th congressional district (represented by Madeleine Dean), the 150th state house district (represented by Joe Webster) and the 24th state senate district (represented by Tracy Pennycuick).

Presidential election results
Year	Republican	Democratic
2024	43.5% 1,106	55.3% 1,408
2020	42.0% 1,032	57.0% 1,401
2016	47.0% 921	47.9% 939
2012	52.8% 994	46.3% 872
2008	46.1% 886	53.2% 1,023
2004	52.9% 992	46.6% 875
2000	54.9% 790	43.4% 624

== Education ==
Trappe is part of the Perkiomen Valley School District.

Residents are zoned to South Elementary School, Middle School East, and Perkiomen Valley High School.

== Notable people ==
- Trappe is the birthplace of Frederick Muhlenberg, US Congressman and the first Speaker of the United States House of Representatives.
- Jimmy Pop from the comedy rock band, Bloodhound Gang
- William Rudolph Smith (1787–1868), Pennsylvania State Representative and Senator, Attorney General of Wisconsin
