= Charles G. Nicholson =

American politician (1919–2003)

Member of the Pennsylvania House of Representatives from the 152nd district
- In office January 7, 1969 – November 30, 1970
- Preceded by: District created
- Succeeded by: Charlotte Fawcett

Personal details
- Born: October 31, 1919 Philadelphia, Pennsylvania
- Died: April 13, 2003 (aged 83) Hatboro, Pennsylvania
- Party: Republican
- Spouse: Joan Billman
- Children: Bruce A. Nicholson; Craig G. Nicholson
- Education: Wharton School of Business
- Occupation: Business Executive; Certified Financial Planner

Charles Glanz Nicholson (October 31, 1919 – April 13, 2003) is a former Republican member of the Pennsylvania House of Representatives.

== Biography ==
A native of Philadelphia, Pennsylvania, Charles G. Nicholson was a graduate of Olney High School and soon went to work in the wholesale carpet firm of Glanz, Behm & Herring, a business concern founded by his grandfather. In 1946, he earned a Certificate in Accounting and Administration from the Evening School of the Wharton School of Business of the University of Pennsylvania. He rose to the position of president of the company, of which he was co-owner. He remained at his post until he sold the company in 1976. He then worked another twenty years as a Certified Financial Planner until his retirement.

After serving on the Upper Moreland Township board of commissioners in 1964, Nicholson was elected to the Pennsylvania State House of Representatives, serving three terms. During his tenure there, he was active on issues concerning student transportation, infrastructure, and roads. A member of various committees, he served as vice-chair of the committee on law and order. Citing increasing business responsibilities, in 1970 Nicholson declined to stand for re-election and retired into private life, although he stayed active in local affairs.

After the State House of Representatives's legislative districts were created, Charles Nicholson represented the 152nd District.

== Death ==
Nicholson died in Hatboro, Pennsylvania on April 13, 2003.
