= 1860 Pennsylvania gubernatorial election =

- October 9, 1860
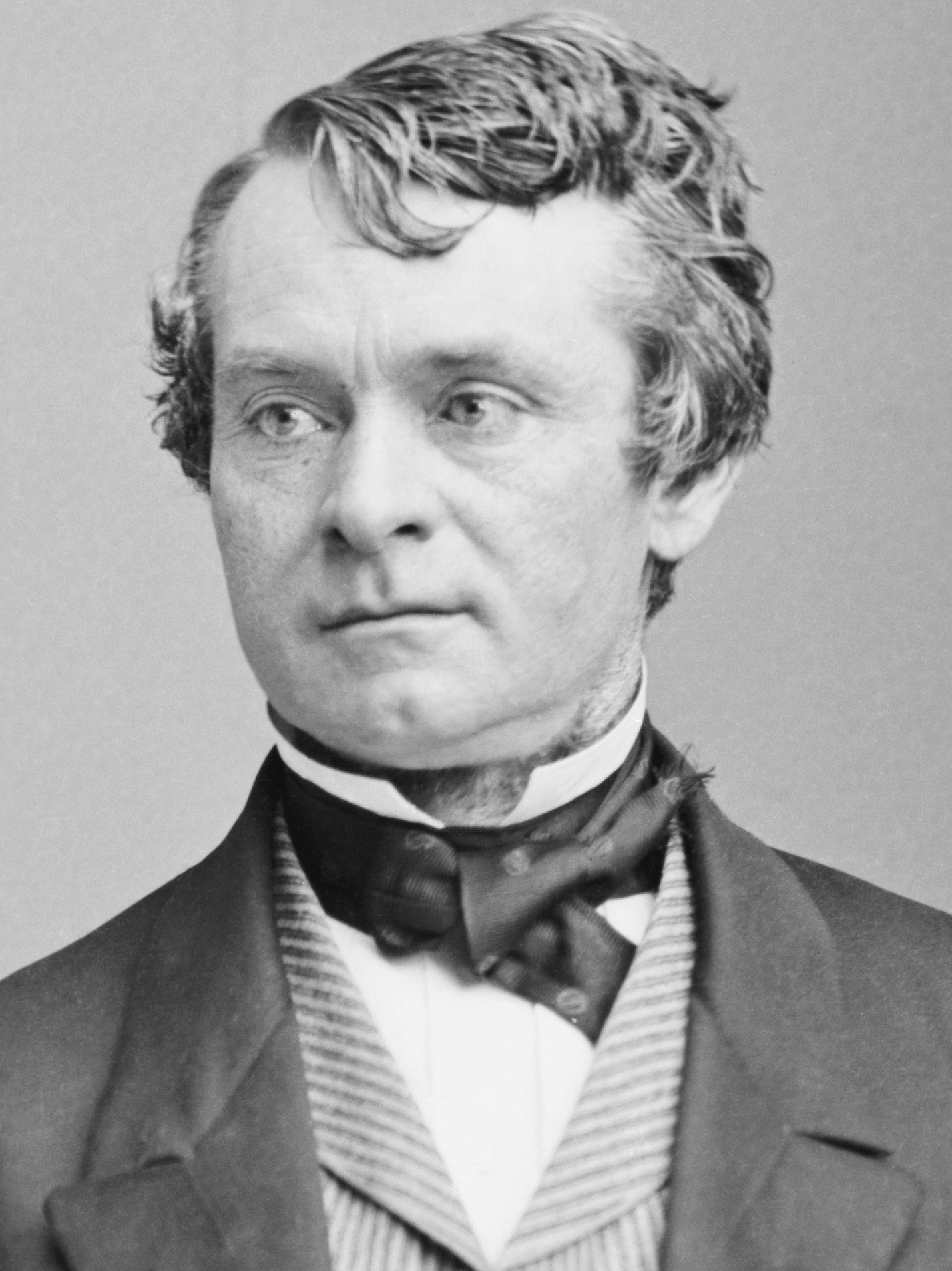

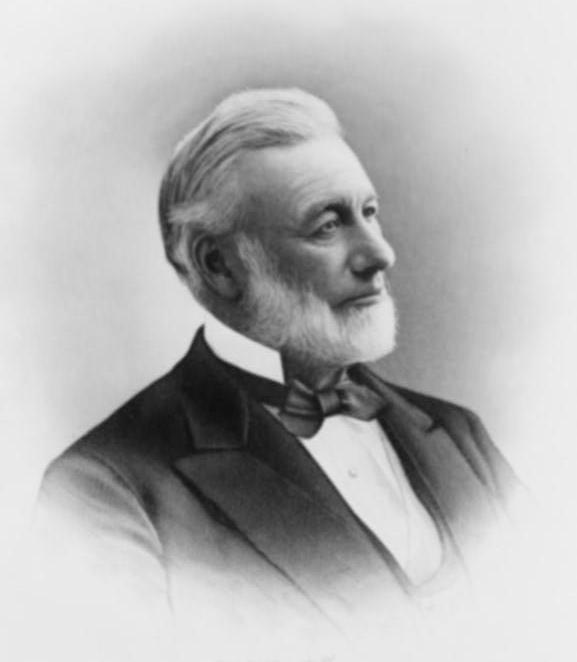
Nominee	Andrew Gregg Curtin	Henry Donnel Foster
Party	Republican	Democratic
Popular vote	262,346	230,230
Percentage	53.26%	46.74%
- County results Curtain: 50–60% 60–70% 70–80% Foster: 50–60% 60–70% 70–80%
Governor before election
William F. Packer
Democratic
Elected Governor
Andrew Curtin
Republican

The 1860 Pennsylvania gubernatorial was held on October 9, almost one month before Presidential election. Andrew Curtin of the newly formed Republican Party won the governor's mansion over Democrat Henry Donnel Foster.

Curtin would go on to become an important figure in the history of the Commonwealth of Pennsylvania and the United States. Pennsylvania's 15th governor and a strong supporter of President Abraham Lincoln, he was inaugurated on January 15, 1861. One of the first state governors to send military units to Washington, D.C. in response to Lincoln's call for help to defend the nation's capital in April of that same year, he was the eponym of Camp Curtin, which became one of the largest staging grounds for the Union Army after it opened on April 18, 1861. In 1863, following the Battle of Gettysburg, Curtin led the state and nation in creating a national cemetery for the Union Army's fallen soldiers. Post-war, he led the creation of a state-funded system of more than forty soldiers' orphans' schools to educate and care for children across Pennsylvania whose fathers had been killed during the war.

== Candidates ==
=== Democratic ===
- Henry Donnel Foster, former U.S. Congressman (from Westmoreland County)

=== Republican ===
- Andrew Curtin, former Secretary of the Commonwealth (from Centre County)

== Campaign ==
As in most of the country, the growing tension over the expansion of slavery was the dominant electoral issue. Although outgoing Governor William F. Packer had been lauded for expanding public education and for aiding the state's iron and glass industries through tough economic times, his reputation was tainted by a strong connection to President James Buchanan. Nonetheless, the state Democratic Party remained strong, and, despite the national split, leadership united behind Foster. By contrast, the Republicans, which had participated in only one prior gubernatorial election, was marked by division. Although Abraham Lincoln was emerging as the party's presidential candidate, state party bosses had hoped to nominate Simon Cameron; it took some time for the party establishment to unify around Curtin, a Lincoln supporter, and his campaign got off to somewhat of a slow start.

Although both candidates discussed similar issues in their campaign, particularly public education and industrial development, local issues were totally overshadowed by the impending threat of war. While Democrats, who backed the Stephen A. Douglas and the Northern plank of their national party almost unanimously, rallied hard behind Foster, the problems with the party's national machinery caught up with their candidate. Curtin, a powerful speaker, was able to convince voters that choosing the Republican line was the only way to keep the nation from division, a message that allowed him to achieve a narrow victory.

== Results ==
Pennsylvania gubernatorial election, 1860
Party	Candidate	Votes	%
Republican	Andrew Gregg Curtin	262,346	53.26
Democratic	Henry Donnel Foster	230,230	46.74
Total votes		492,576	100.00
Turnout			64.60
