= Hatboro, Pennsylvania =

Borough in Pennsylvania, US

- Borough
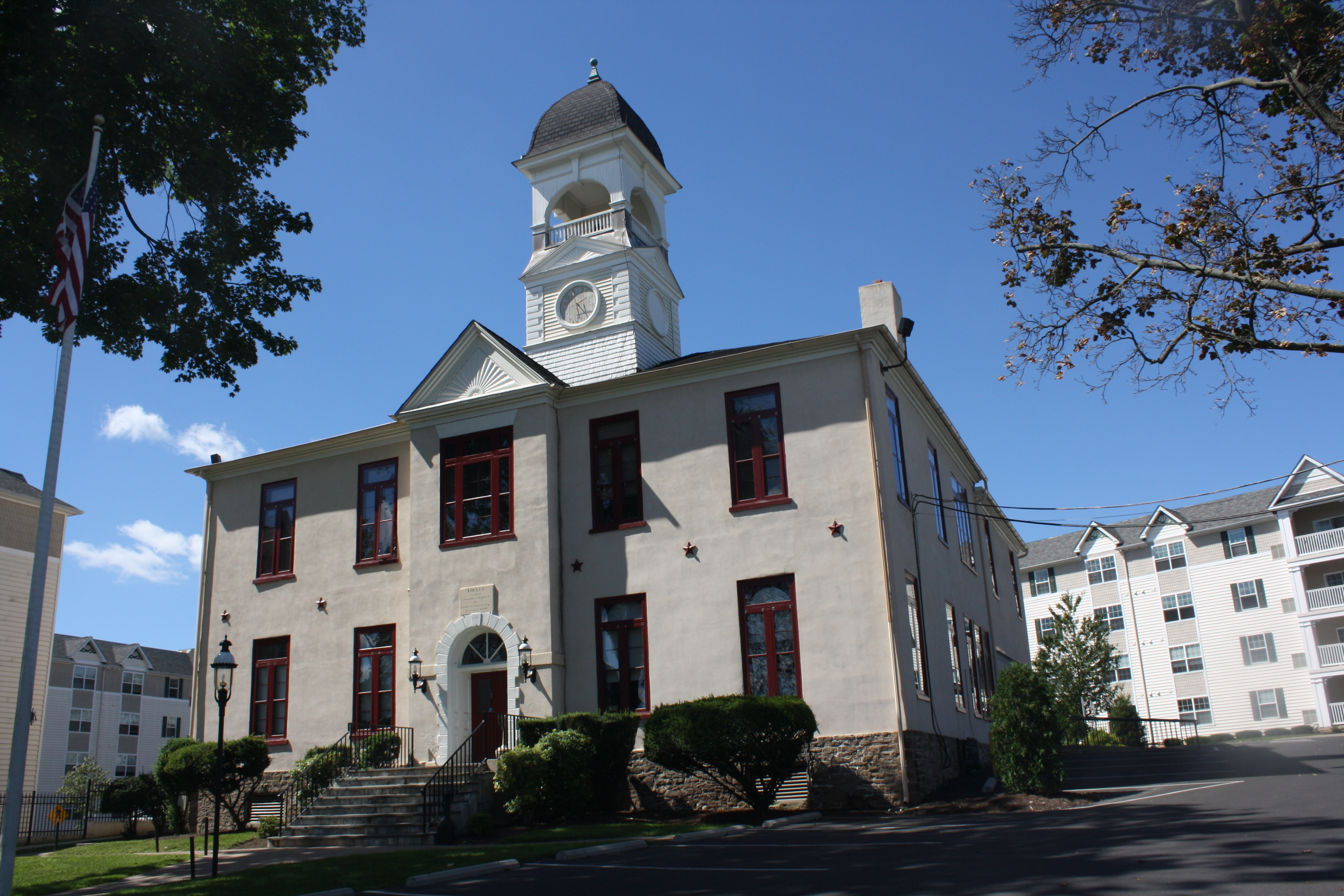
- Loller Academy in Hatboro in September 2017

- Seal

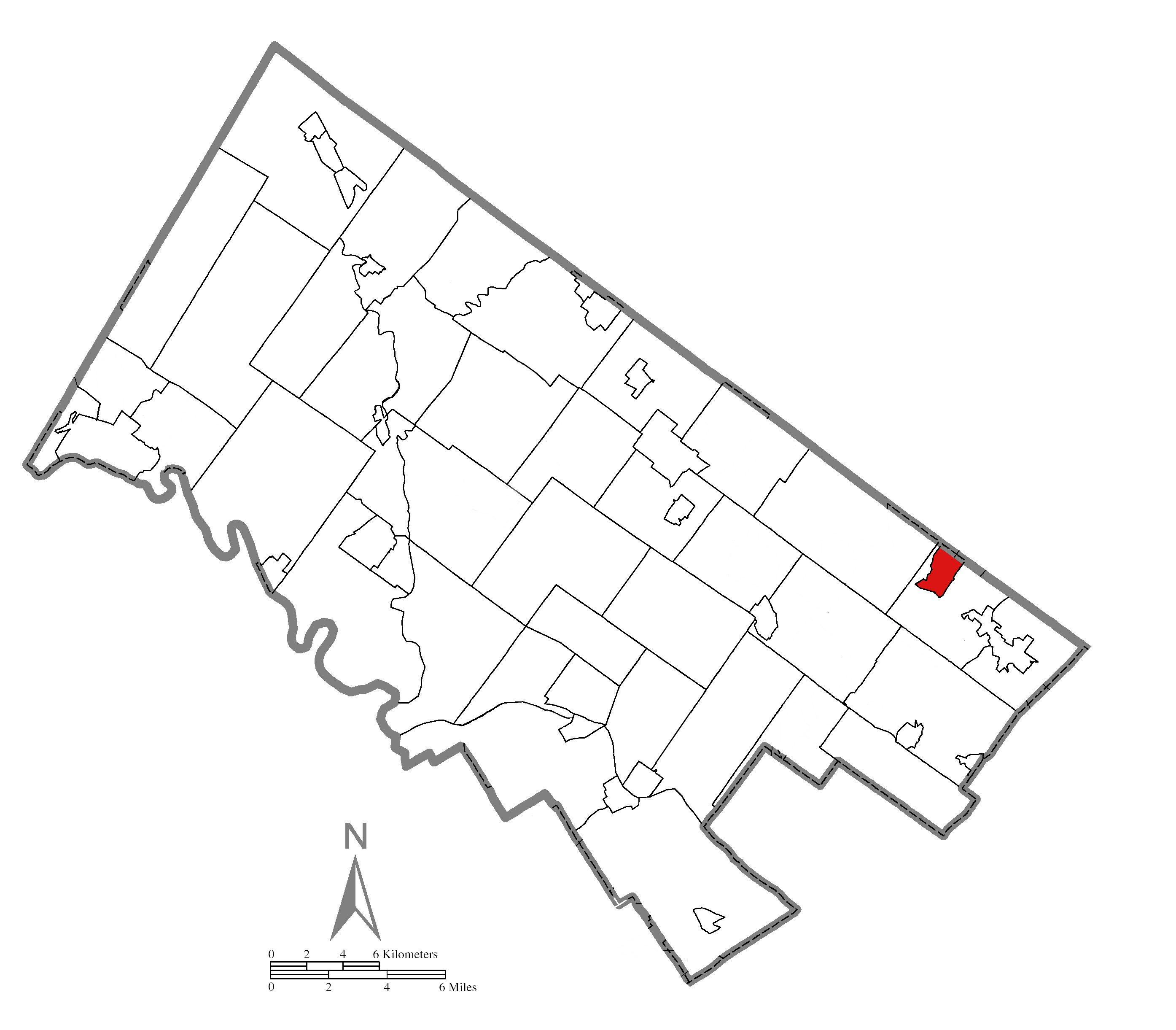
- Location of Hatboro in Montgomery County, Pennsylvania

- Location of Hatboro in Pennsylvania Hatboro (the United States)
- Coordinates: 40°10′27″N 75°06′25″W
- Country: United States
- State: Pennsylvania
- County: Montgomery
- Founded: 1715

Government
  - Mayor: Tim Schultz (D)

Area
  - Total: 1.42 sq mi (3.68 km^{2})
  - Land: 1.42 sq mi (3.68 km^{2})
  - Water: 0 sq mi (0.00 km^{2})
- Elevation: 223 ft (68 m)

Population (2020)
  - Total: 8,238
  - Density: 5,794.2/sq mi (2,237.17/km^{2})
- Time zone: UTC-5 (EST)
  - Summer (DST): UTC-4 (EDT)
- ZIP Code: 19040
- Area codes: 215, 267, and 445
- FIPS code: 42-33088
- Website: myhatboro.org

Hatboro (known locally as the Boro) is a borough in Montgomery County, Pennsylvania, United States. The population was 8,238 at the 2020 census.

== History ==
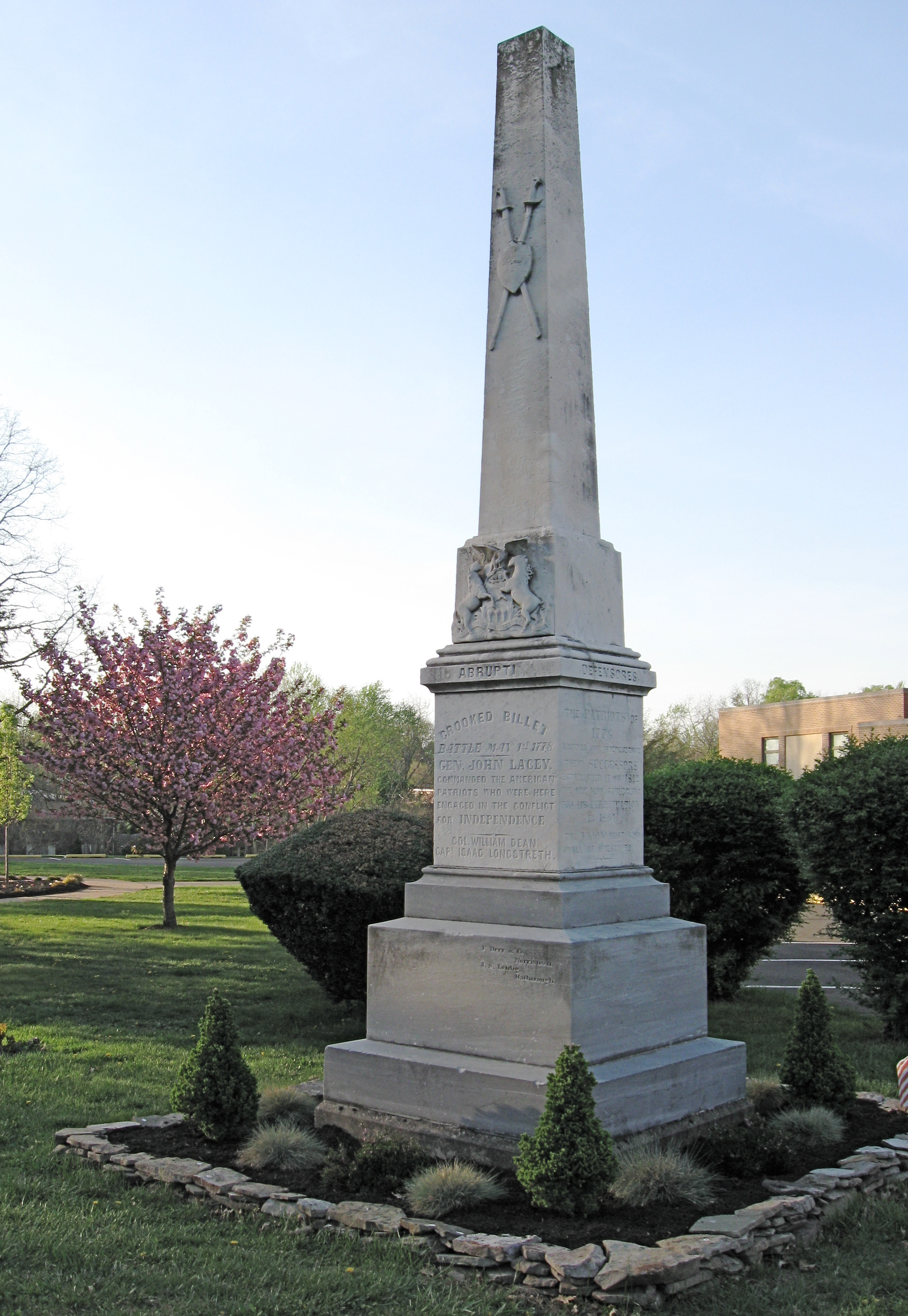
Battle of Crooked Billet Monument

The town of Hatboro is located on land purchased from William Penn by the family of Nicholas More around 1705. The first land titles in town were issued in 1711. Original construction by early residents of the town occurred between 1715 and 1719. Early settlement pre-dating the Hatboro name occurred in the Crooked Billet area east of York Road, between Moreland Avenue and Byberry Road.

Early resident John Dawson entertained guests at the Crooked Billet Inn as well as manufacturing a line of hats. When the post office opened in 1809 the town was officially called Hatborough. U.S. Postmaster General John Wanamaker officially changed the name of the town in 1889 to Hatboro.

The Union Library Company of Hatboro, the third library company to be founded in Pennsylvania, was formed in 1755. This building still stands on its original site today and still serves as a library. George Washington and his troops passed through the town numerous times during 1777 in pursuit of British Troops. The Battle of Crooked Billet was fought in 1778.

The year 1811 saw the construction of the Loller Academy, the first bank was built in 1873, and railroad service connected to Hatboro in 1874.

The Loller Academy, Roberts and Mander Stove Company Buildings, and Union Library Company are listed on the National Register of Historic Places.

== Geography ==
Hatboro is located at 40°10′39″N 75°6′16″W (40.177635, −75.104424). According to the U.S. Census Bureau, the borough has a total area of 1.4 square miles (3.6 km^{2}), all land.

The Borough of Hatboro is a small municipality that is surrounded by Upper Moreland Township in Montgomery County to the west, south, and east; and Warminster Township in Bucks County to the north. The Pennypack Creek runs through the center of town under Pennsylvania Route 263 (York Road) and through the municipality.

=== Climate ===
The climate in this area is characterized by hot, humid summers and generally mild to cool winters. According to the Köppen Climate Classification system, Hatboro has a humid subtropical climate, abbreviated "Cfa" on climate maps.

Hatboro is Plant Hardiness Zone 7a (0 °F to 5 °F) for both the 2012 and 2023 Plant Hardiness Maps, with a +3F change from 2012 to 2023.

Climate data for Hatboro, Pennsylvania
Month	Jan	Feb	Mar	Apr	May	Jun	Jul	Aug	Sep	Oct	Nov	Dec	Year
Mean daily maximum °F (°C)	39 (4)	43 (6)	52 (11)	63 (17)	74 (23)	82 (28)	87 (31)	85 (29)	77 (25)	66 (19)	55 (13)	44 (7)	64 (18)
Mean daily minimum °F (°C)	24 (−4)	25 (−4)	33 (1)	42 (6)	52 (11)	61 (16)	66 (19)	65 (18)	57 (14)	45 (7)	37 (3)	29 (−2)	45 (7)
Average precipitation inches (mm)	3.9 (99)	3.0 (76)	4.2 (110)	3.9 (99)	4.8 (120)	3.6 (91)	4.7 (120)	4.3 (110)	4.7 (120)	3.4 (86)	3.7 (94)	3.8 (97)	48 (1,222)
Source: The Weather Channel

== Demographics ==
Historical population
Census	Pop.	Note	%±
1880	586		—
1890	781		33.3%
1900	823		5.4%
1910	963		17.0%
1920	1,102		14.4%
1930	2,651		140.6%
1940	2,605		−1.7%
1950	4,788		83.8%
1960	7,315		52.8%
1970	8,880		21.4%
1980	7,579		−14.7%
1990	7,382		−2.6%
2000	7,393		0.1%
2010	7,360		−0.4%
2020	8,238		11.9%
2021 (est.)	8,239	▲	0.0%
Sources: 2020 Census

=== 2010 census ===
As of the census of 2010, the borough was 92.4% White, 2.7% Black or African American, 0.3% Native American, 1.6% Asian, and 1.6% were two or more races. 4.3% of the population were of Hispanic or Latino ancestry

== Parks and recreation ==
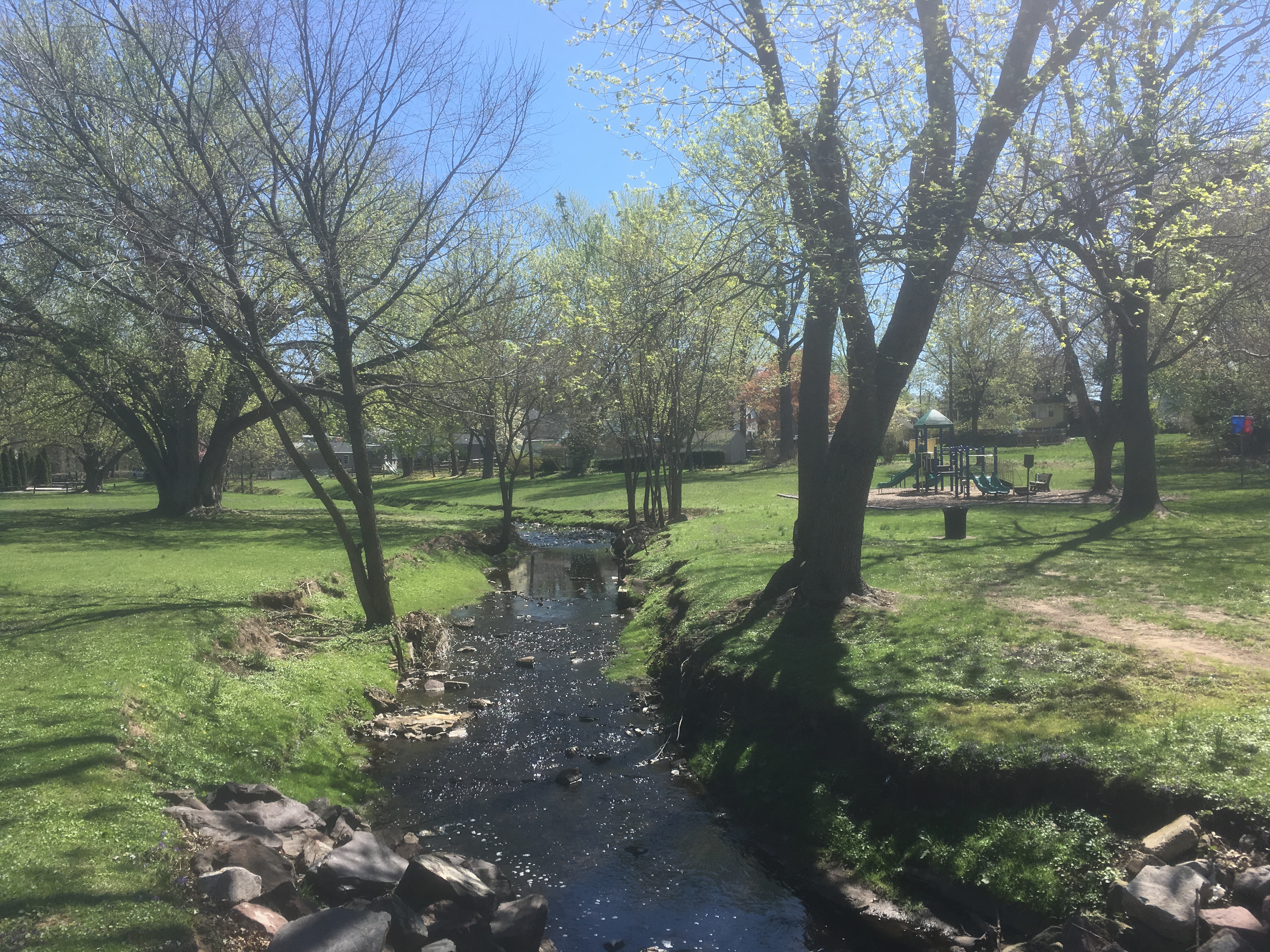
Hatboro Memorial Park

Public parks serving the borough of Hatboro include Hatboro Memorial Park, Eaton Park, Tanner Park, Miller Meadow, Blair Mill Park, home of the Hatboro Little League baseball fields, which is owned by Upper Moreland Township but is in Horsham Township, Celano Park, and Pennypack Park (on the grounds of the now-closed Pennypack Elementary School).

The Hatboro Memorial Pool is located adjacent to Hatboro Memorial Park and is open during the summer from Memorial Day weekend to Labor Day weekend. The pool offers a water slide, a baby pool, and a dew drop. The Hatboro Memorial Pool offers day passes and season memberships, with lower rates for borough residents, and has a swim team, the Hatboro Storm.

== Politics and government ==
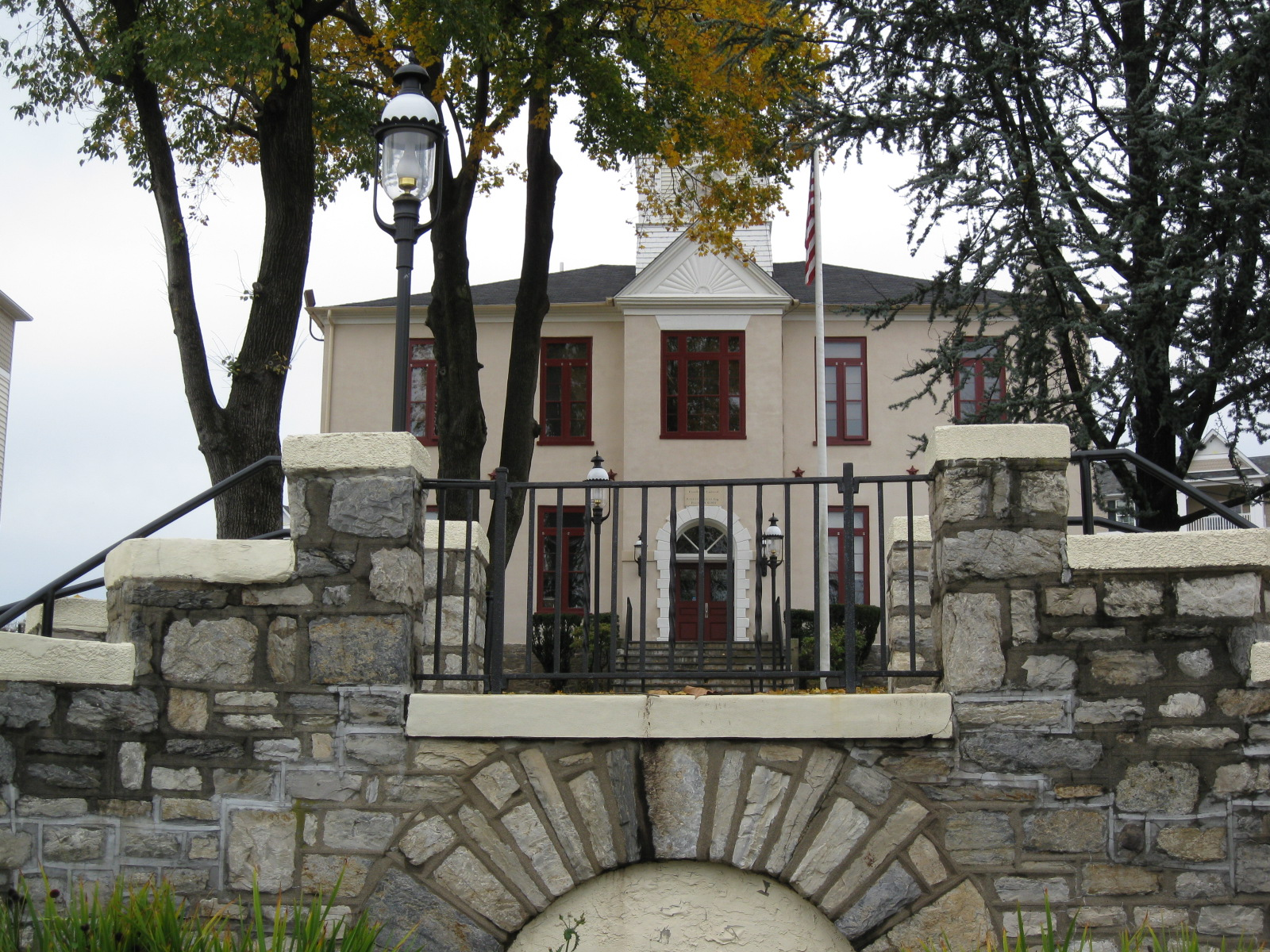
Hatboro borough hall

Presidential elections results
Year	Republican	Democratic
2020	40.0% 1,883	58.7% 2,763
2016	41.2% 1,677	54.1% 2,206
2012	42.1% 1,551	56.1% 2,065
2008	39.8% 1,452	58.7% 2,142
2004	45.8% 1,632	53.5% 1,906
2000	46.6% 1,383	49.2% 1,461

Hatboro has a city manager form of government with a mayor and a seven-member borough council.

- Mayor – Tim Schultz (D)
- Council President – George Bollendorf Jr. (D)
- Council Vice President – Nicole Reichner (D)
- Councilperson – Todd A'Harrah (R)
- Councilperson – Nicole Shay (D)
- Councilperson – Jennifer Hendrickson (D)
- Councilperson – Alex Myers (D)
- Councilperson – Amanda Jacobus (D)

The Borough Manager is Diane Hegele.

The borough is part of the:

- Fourth Congressional District (represented by Rep. Madeleine Dean)
- Pennsylvania's 152nd State House District (represented by Rep. Nancy Guenst)
- Pennsylvania's 12th State Senate District (represented by Sen. Maria Collett)

The borough maintains the Hatboro Police Department, which provides police services to Hatboro. The Hatboro Police Department is composed of the Chief of Police, five Sergeants, eight Patrol Officers, three Police Operations Clerks, a Secretary, and five school crossing guards. Fire protection in Hatboro is provided by the Enterprise Fire Company of Hatboro, a volunteer fire company. Emergency Medical Services in Hatboro and surrounding areas is provided by the Second Alarmers Rescue Squad, which maintains a station in the borough.

== Education ==
Hatboro is served by the Hatboro-Horsham School District, along with Horsham Township. One of the district's elementary schools, Crooked Billet Elementary School, is located in the borough. The remainder of the schools, including Keith Valley Middle School and Hatboro-Horsham High School, are in Horsham Township.

== Infrastructure ==
=== Transportation ===
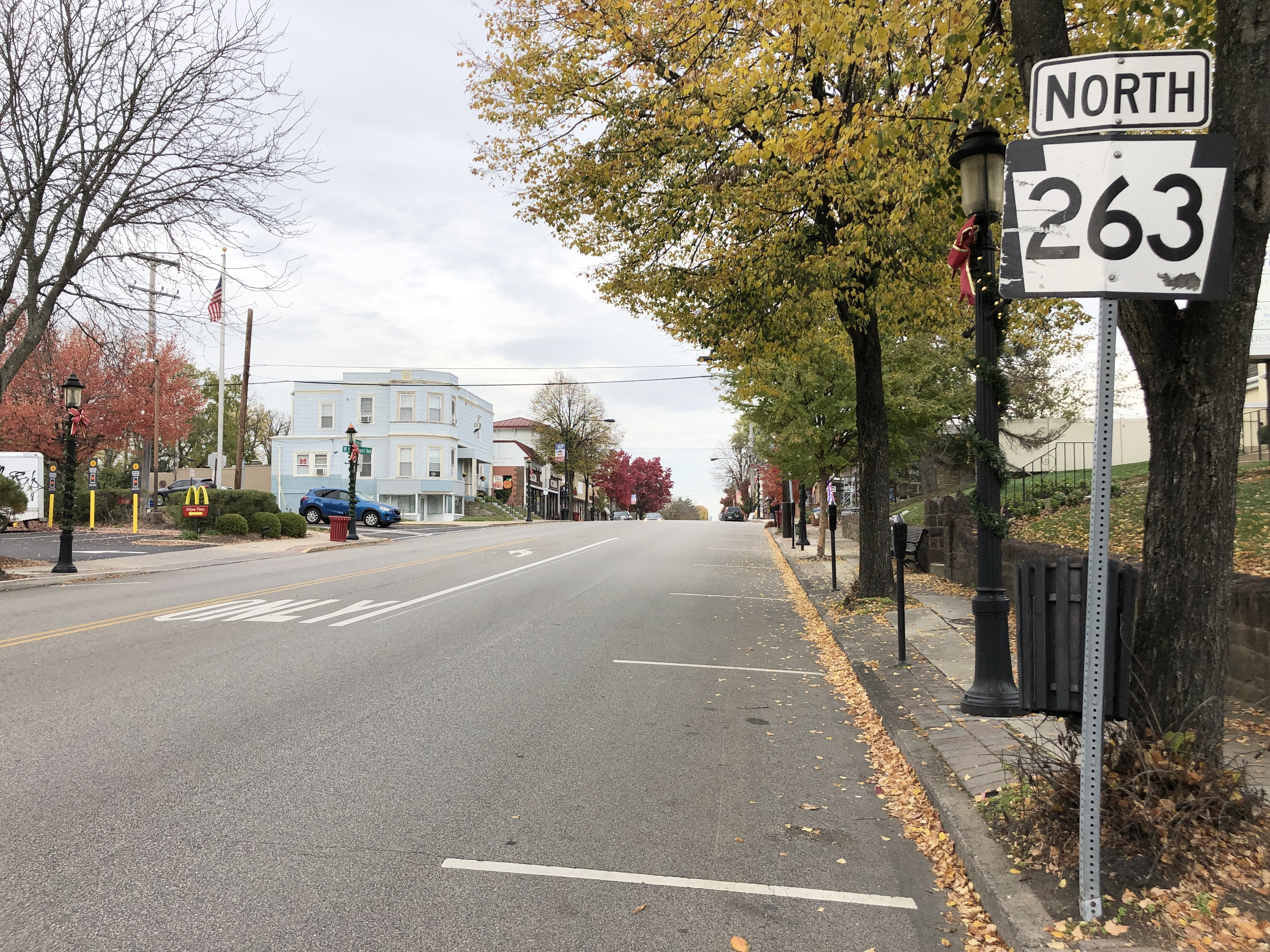
PA 263 just north of PA 332 in Hatboro

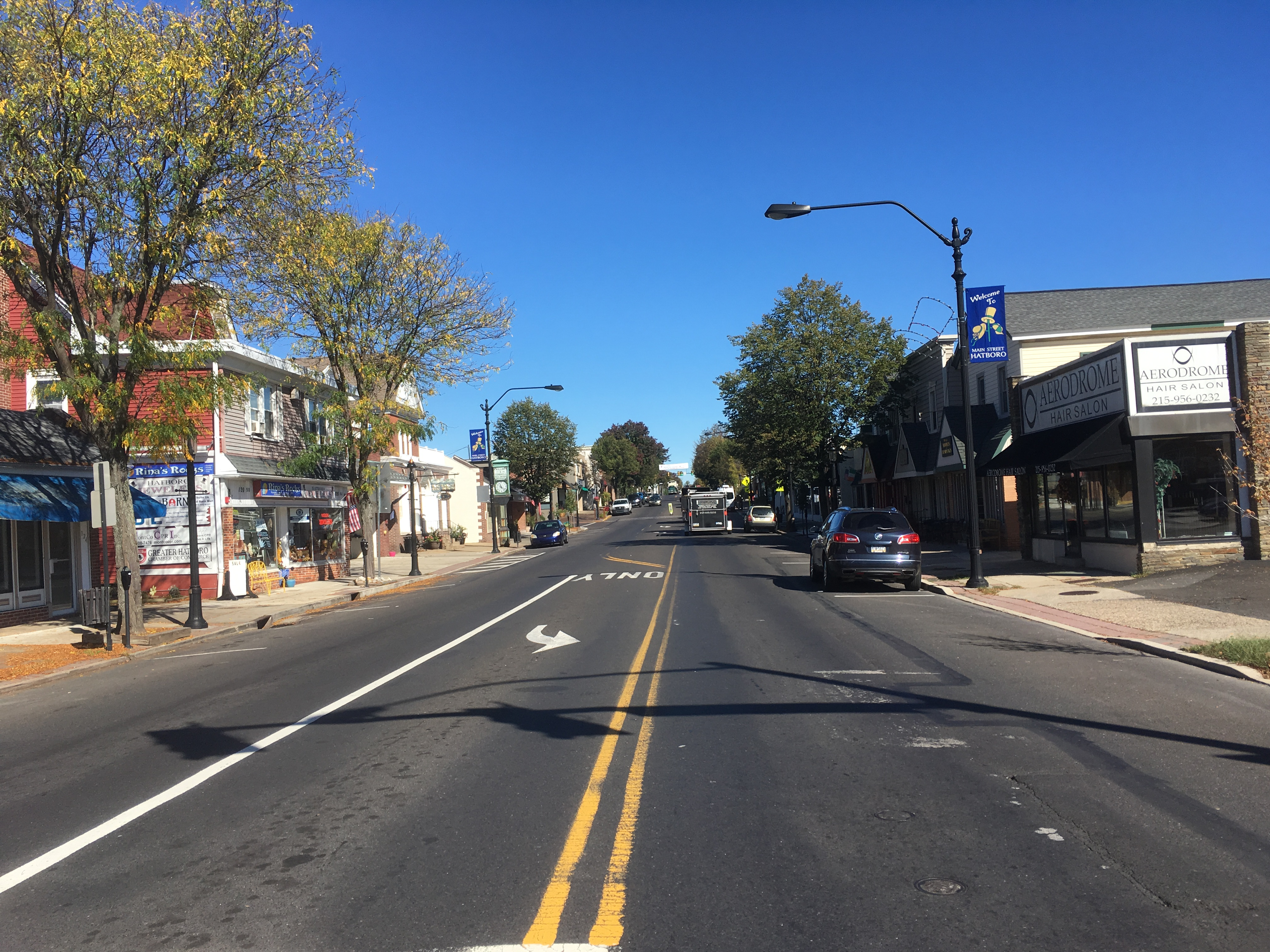
York Road northbound in Downtown Hatboro

As of 2017 there were 21.91 miles (35.26 km) of public roads in Hatboro, of which 4.47 miles (7.19 km) were maintained by the Pennsylvania Department of Transportation (PennDOT) and 17.44 miles (28.07 km) were maintained by the borough.

The main north–south road in Hatboro is Pennsylvania Route 263 (York Road), which serves as the town's main street. Pennsylvania Route 332 begins at PA 263 in Hatboro and heads east on Montgomery Avenue and northeast on Jacksonville Road. The main east–west street in Hatboro is Moreland Avenue. Other important roads in Hatboro include County Line Road (which runs along the northern border with Warminster Township in Bucks County) (SR 2038), Warminster Road (which runs along the eastern border with Upper Moreland Township) (SR 2040), Byberry Road (formerly PA 763 and now SR 2009, and Horsham Road. The Willow Grove interchange of the Pennsylvania Turnpike (Interstate 276) is nearby in Upper Moreland Township.

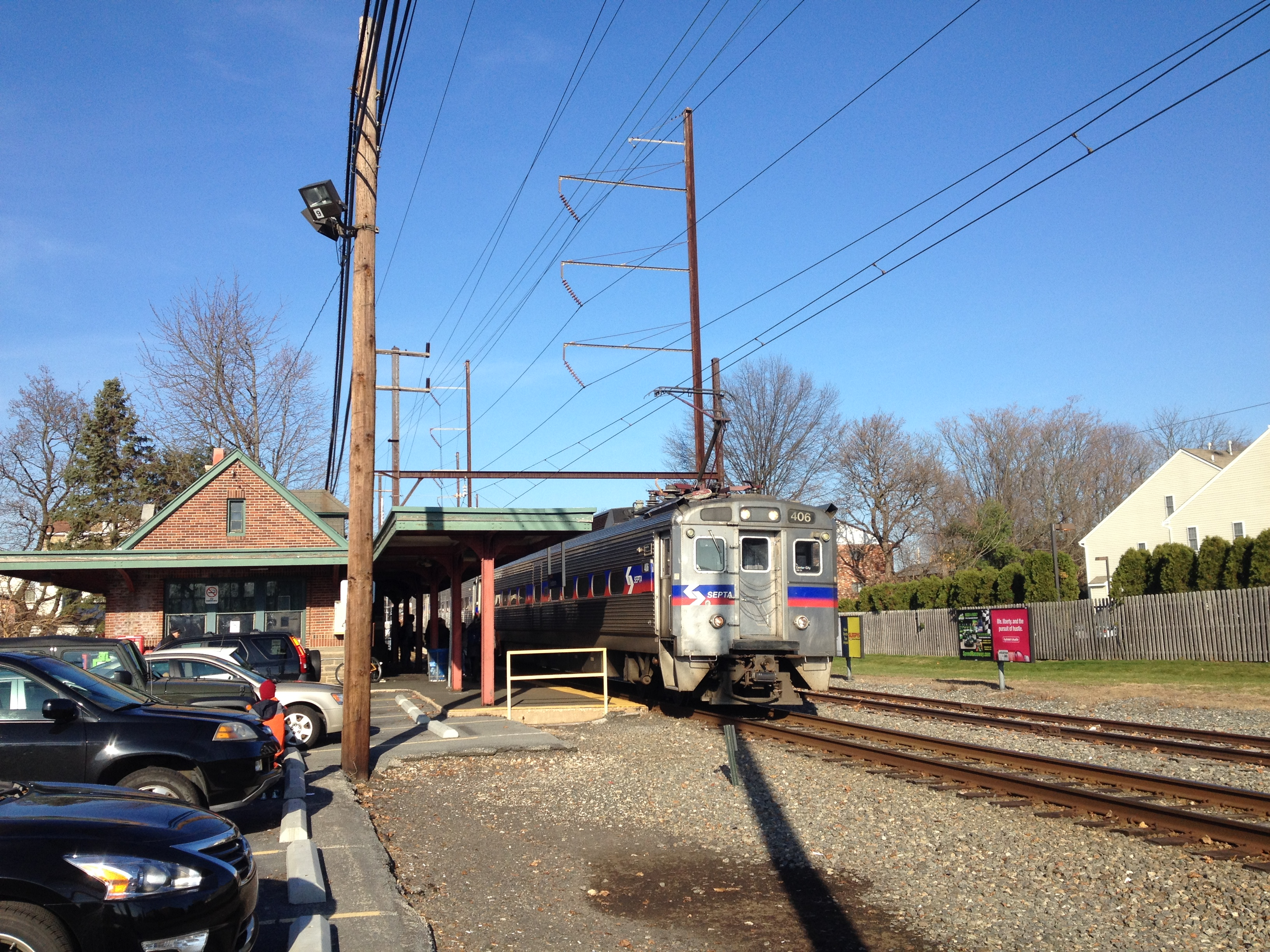
A SEPTA Regional Rail train on the Warminster Line at Hatboro station

SEPTA provides Regional Rail service to the borough at the Hatboro station along the Warminster Line which runs between Warminster and Center City Philadelphia. SEPTA City Bus Route 22 serves Hatboro along York Road, running between Warminster and the Olney Transportation Center in North Philadelphia.

Parking in the downtown area of Hatboro is regulated by on-street parking meters and public off-street parking lots using multi-space parking meters. The borough also maintains a paid parking lot for commuters near the Hatboro station along with on-street parking meters along Jacksonville Road near the train station.

=== Utilities ===
Electricity and natural gas in Hatboro is provided by PECO Energy Company, a subsidiary of Exelon. Water in Hatboro is provided by Aqua Pennsylvania, a subsidiary of Aqua America. The Upper Moreland-Hatboro Joint Sewer Authority provides sewage service to Hatboro along with neighboring Upper Moreland Township. The Hatboro Borough Public Works Department provides trash and recycling collection to the borough. Cable, telephone, and internet service to the area is provided by Xfinity and Verizon. Hatboro is served by area codes 215, 267, and 445.

== Notable people ==
- Jill Biden, First Lady of the United States
- Roy Cornell, former Pennsylvania State Representative
- Susan Cornell, daughter of Roy Cornell and former Pennsylvania State Representative
- Séamus Egan, Irish musician
- Greg Erwin, former crew chief for Wood Brothers Racing driver Matt DiBenedetto in the NASCAR Cup Series
- Isaac Newton Evans, former U.S. Representative
- Nancy Guenst, former Pennsylvania State Representative and Hatboro mayor
- Tom Murt, former Pennsylvania State Representative
- Kurt Volker, former United States Ambassador to NATO
- Steve Yerkes, former professional baseball player, Boston Red Sox, Chicago Cubs, and Pittsburgh Rebels
