= Pennsylvania's 12th Senate district =

American legislative district

Pennsylvania's 12th State Senate district
Senator
Maria Collett; D–Lower Gwynedd Township
- Population (2021): 263,688

Pennsylvania State Senate District 12 includes part of Montgomery County. It is currently represented by Democrat Maria Collett.

== District profile ==
The district includes the following areas:

- Ambler
- Bryn Athyn
- Franconia Township
- Hatboro
- Hatfield
- Hatfield Township
- Horsham Township
- Lansdale
- Lower Gwynedd Township
- Lower Moreland Township
- Montgomery Township
- Plymouth Township
- Salford Township
- Souderton
- Telford (Montgomery County portion)
- Upper Dublin Township
- Upper Moreland Township
- Whitpain Township
- Worcester Township

== Senators ==
Representative	Party	Years	District home	Note
Alexander Dysart	Democratic-Republican	1815 – 1820		
Michael Wallace	Democratic-Republican	1819 – 1822		
Henry Winter	Democratic	1831 – 1832		
Henry King	Jackson Democrat	1825 – 1830		U.S. Representative for Pennsylvania's 7th congressional district from 1831 to 1833 and Pennsylvania's 8th congressional district from 1833 to 1835
William G. Scott	Democratic	1827 – 1830		
Walter Copake Livingston	Democratic	1831 – 1832		
Jacob Kern	Buchanan Democrat	1831 – 1836		
Peter Newhard	Democratic	1833 – 1836		Pennsylvania State Representative from 1817 to 1819, 1824 to 1825 and 1829. U.S. Representative for Pennsylvania's 8th congressional district from 1839 to 1843
Peter S. Michler	Anti-Masonic	1835 – 1836		
Robert P. Fleming	Democratic	1839 – 1842		
Joseph Fearon Quay Sr.	Whig	1843 – 1844		
Jesse C. Horton	Democratic	1851 – 1852		
William Harris	Whig	1847 – 1848		
Henry Fulton	Democratic	1851 – 1852		Pennsylvania State Senator for the 17th district from 1849 to 1850
William Fisher Packer	Democratic	1851 – 1852		Pennsylvania State Representative in 1847. 14th Governor of Pennsylvania from 1858 to 1861
Jacob Samils Haldeman	Democratic-Republican	1853 – 1856		Pennsylvania State Representative from 1850 to 1851. Minister Resident of the United States at Stockholm from 1861 to 1864
Henry Johnson	Republican	1861 – 1864		
Jasper Billings Stark	Democratic	1865 – 1866		
Lazarus D. Shoemaker	Republican	1867 – 1870		U.S. Representative for Pennsylvania's 12th congressional district from 1871 to 1875
Samuel G. Turner	Democratic	1869 – 1870		
Jacob George Heilman	Republican	1873 – 1874		
Williams Anders Yeakle	Republican	1873 – 1876		
Jones Detwiler	Democratic	1877 – 1878		
Lewis Royer	Republican	1879 – 1882		
William Henry Sutton	Democratic	1883 – 1885		
Henry Riehle Brown	Republican	1889 – 1890		
Arthur D. Markley	Democratic	1891 – 1894		
Henry D. Saylor	Republican	1895 – 1898		
John Adams Wentz	Democratic	1899 – 1902		
Algernon B. Roberts	Republican	1903 – 1908		
Thomas B. Harper	Republican	1909 – 1910		
Joseph Heacock	Democratic	1911 – 1914		
Frank Penrose Croft	Republican	1915 – 1916		
James Slingluff Boyd	Republican	1919 – 1922		
Wilbur Fletcher Stites	Republican	1923 – 1926		
Theodore Lane Bean	Republican	1935 – 1938		
Franklin Spencer Edmonds	Republican	1939 – 1944		
Lloyd H. Wood	Republican	1947 – 1950		Pennsylvania State Representative for Montgomery County from 1939 to 1946. 20th Lieutenant Governor of Pennsylvania from 1951 to 1955
Henry J. Propert	Republican	1951 – 1964		
Morton Fetterolf	Republican	1964 – 1964	Blue Bell	Pennsylvania State Representative for the Montgomery County district from 1957 to 1964. Elected to the Pennsylvania State Senate on April 28, 1964 and resigned on July 2, 1964
Wilmot E. Fleming	Republican	1964 – 1978		Pennsylvania State Representative for Montgomery County from 1963 to 1964
Stewart J. Greenleaf	Republican	1979 – 2019	Upper Moreland Township	Pennsylvania State Representative for the 152nd district from 1977 to 1978
Maria Collett	Democratic	2019 – present	Lower Gwynedd Township	On November 6, 2018, Maria Collett (D) defeated Stewart Greenleaf Jr. in his bid to succeed his retiring father.

== Recent election results ==
PA Senate election, 2022
Party	Candidate	Votes	%
Democratic	Maria Collett (incumbent)	76,749	59.7
Republican	Robert Davies	51,803	40.3
Total votes		128,552	100.0
Democratic hold			

PA Senate election, 2018
Party	Candidate	Votes	%
Democratic	Maria Collett	62,069	52.7
Republican	Stewart Greenleaf, Jr.	55,742	47.3
Total votes		117,811	100.0
Democratic gain from Republican			

PA Senate election, 2014
Party	Candidate	Votes	%
Republican	Stewart Greenleaf (incumbent)	50,319	63.3
Democratic	Ruth Damsker	29,123	36.7
Total votes		79,442	100.0
Republican hold			

PA Senate election, 2010
Party	Candidate	Votes	%
Republican	Stewart Greenleaf (incumbent)	61,802	64.0
Democratic	Ruth Damsker	34,745	36.0
Total votes		96,547	100.0
Republican hold			
