= Roberts and Mander Stove Company Buildings =

- U.S. National Register of Historic Places
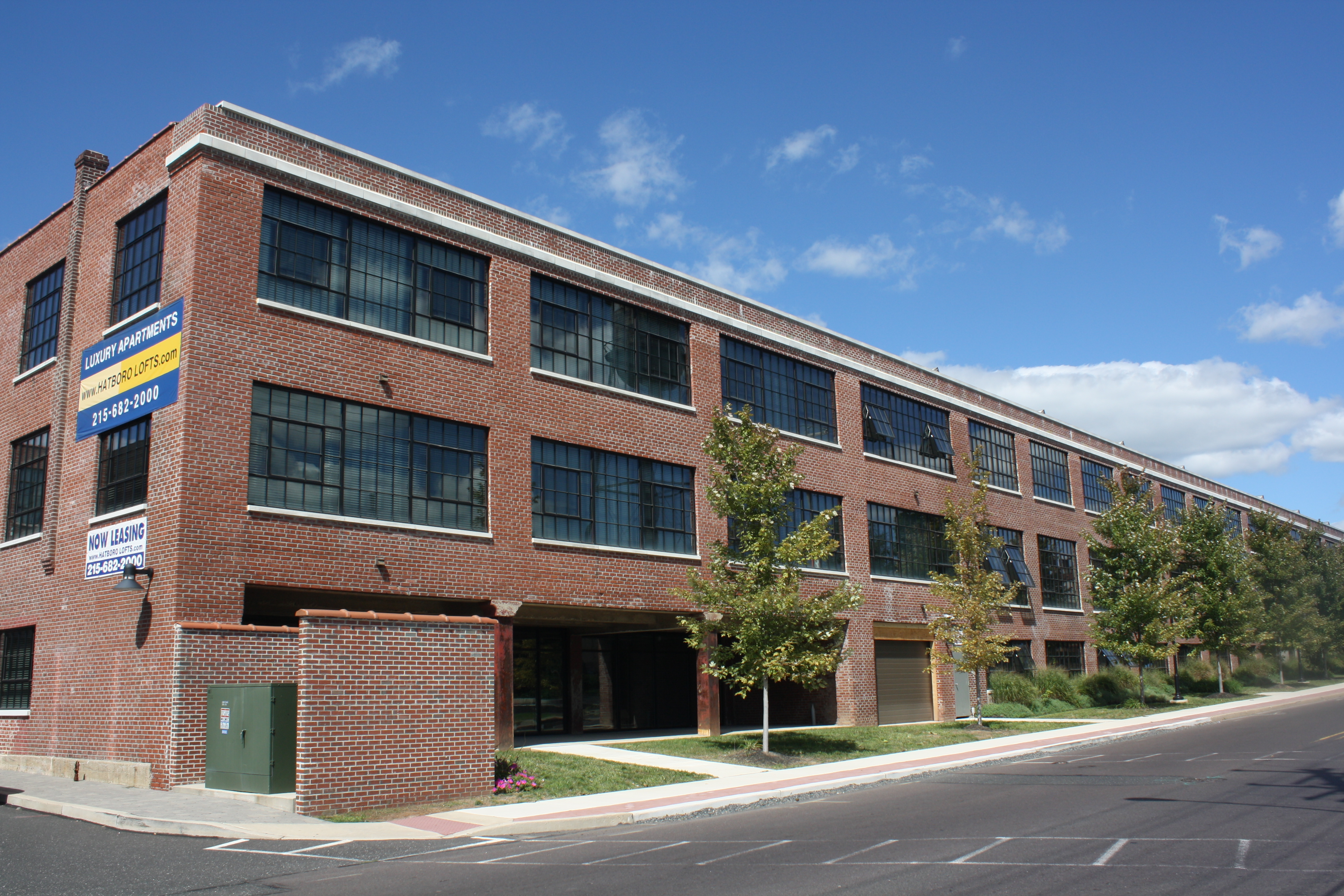
- Roberts and Mander Stove Co, Main Building in September 2012, now the Hatboro Lofts apartments.

- Location within Pennsylvania Location within the United States
- Location: Roughly along Jacksonville Rd., Tanner Ave., and Lincoln Ave., Hatboro, Pennsylvania
- Coordinates: 40°10′59″N 75°05′54″W
- Area: 11.7 acres (4.7 ha)
- Built: c. 1915-1944
- Architectural style: Early Commercial
- NRHP reference No.: 05000799
- Added to NRHP: August 7, 2005

The Roberts and Mander Stove Company Buildings complex is an historic factory site in Hatboro, Montgomery County, Pennsylvania, United States.

It was added to the National Register of Historic Places in 2005.

== History and architectural features ==
This complex consists of six contributing buildings and one contributing structure. They are the foundry building (c. 1915, c. 1960), the main manufacturing building (1915-1944), the gate house (c. 1925), the transformer house (c. 1925), the smelter (c. 1925), the garage (c. 1925), and the water tank.

The buildings are one-and-one-half-story, brick structures with flat roofs and large window openings. The Roberts and Mander Stove Company acquired the existing Hatboro Foundry buildings in 1918, and operated until 1950.

A portion of the site has been converted into apartments known as the Hatboro Lofts. The water tank was torn down in November 2017.

== Gallery ==
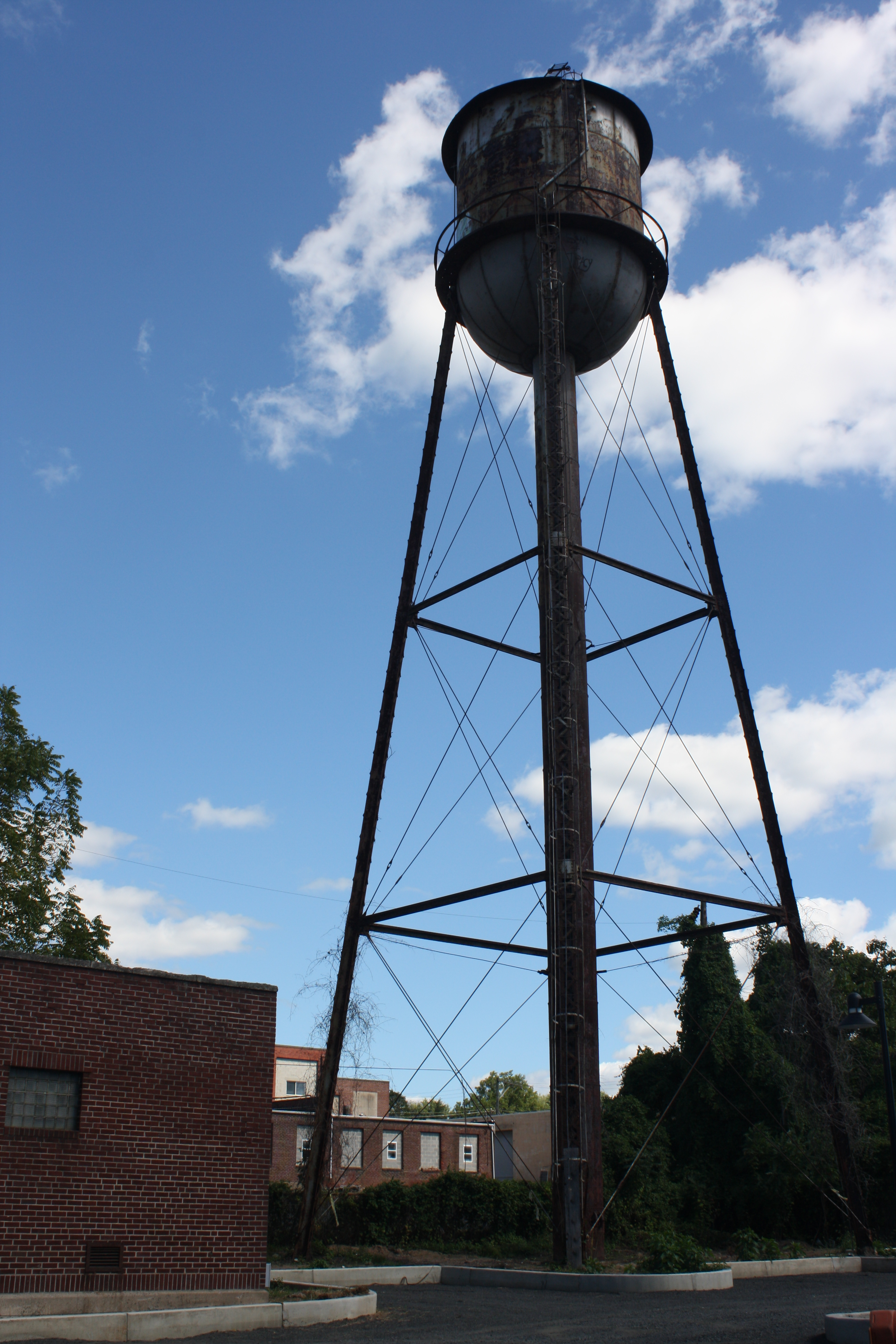
Water Tank of Roberts and Mander Stove
