= Charlotte Fawcett =

American politician

Charlotte D. Fawcett

Member of the Pennsylvania House of Representatives from the 152nd district
- In office January 5, 1971 – November 30, 1976
- Preceded by: Charles Nicholson
- Succeeded by: Stewart Greenleaf

Personal details
- Born: April 20, 1911 Delaware County, Iowa, United States
- Died: July 1, 1998 (aged 87) Palm Harbor, Florida, United States
- Party: Republican
- Spouse: Cecil C. Fawcett
- Children: Kennedy C. Fawcett, Kaye C. (Fawcett) Benson
- Education: Upper Iowa University

Charlotte Madge Durey Fawcett (April 20, 1911 – July 1, 1998) was a Republican member of the Pennsylvania House of Representatives.

== Formative years ==
Born in Delaware County, Iowa on April 20, 1911, Charlotte Madge Durey was the oldest of sixteen children born to Floyd A. Durey and Cora (Rolfe) Durey. She graduated from Lamont High School in 1929, and then attended Upper Iowa College (now Upper Iowa University) from 1928 to 1929.

== Public service and political career ==
A member of the committee which established the first library in Lower Moreland Township in Pennsylvania, she also served as that committee's secretary and personnel chair before becoming president of the library board. She also then chaired the joint committee which oversaw that library's merger with the Norristown Library. A charter member and subsequent president of the Huntingdon Valley Women's Club, she also served as a trustee of the Southeast District American Library Association and Pennsylvania Library Association.

A member of the Republican Committee, Charlotte D. Fawcett also chaired the Lower Moreland Township Republican Committee, served as the parliamentarian for the Eastern Montgomery County Council of Republican Women, and served as the chair of Republican Area 11 for Montgomery County from 1968 to 1969. A delegate to Pennsylvania's Constitutional Convention in 1968, she was then elected to the Pennsylvania House of Representatives for its 1971, 1973, and 1975 terms, but did not run for reelection during the 1977 term. She represented the House's 152nd district.

== Death and interment ==
Fawcett died at the Mease Countryside Hospital near her home in Palm Harbor, Florida on July 1, 1998. She was survived by her husband, Cecil Fawcett, and children, son Kennedy Fawcett, and daughter Kaye C. (Fawcett) Benson, as well as multiple siblings and grandchildren.
