= Morton Fetterolf =

American politician

Morton H. Fetterolf, Jr.

Member of the Pennsylvania Senate from the 12th district
- In office April 28, 1964 – July 2, 1964
- Preceded by: Henry Propert
- Succeeded by: Wilmot E. Fleming

Member of the Pennsylvania House of Representatives from the Montgomery County district
- In office January 1, 1957 – April 28, 1964

Personal details
- Born: April 18, 1912
- Died: November 4, 1997 (aged 85)
- Party: Republican

Morton H. Fetterolf, Jr. (April 18, 1912 – November 4, 1997) was an American politician from Pennsylvania who served as a Republican member of the Pennsylvania House of Representatives for the Montgomery County district from 1957 to 1964 including as Majority Whip from 1963 to 1964. He also served in the Pennsylvania State Senate for the 12th district in 1964. He was elected to the state senate on April 28, 1964 and resigned on July 2, 1964.

== Early life and education ==
Fetterolf was born in Rydal, Pennsylvania and attended the William Penn Charter School, The Hill School, and Yale University.

He served in the U.S. Navy during World War II from 1943 to 1946.

== Business career ==
He worked as vice president and director of the Millfield Coal and Mining Company and as director of the Sugar Creek Coal and Mining Company. He was a stock broker for Newburger and Company and owner of the Philadelphia Bulldogs, a professional football team. He also served as executive vice-president of the Continental Football League.

He resigned the state senate in 1964 to join the stock brokerage firm Newburger & Company where he worked until retirement.

He died on November 4, 1997.
