= Roy Cornell =

American politician

Roy W. Cornell

Member of the Pennsylvania House of Representatives from the 152nd district
- In office January 2, 1979 – January 1, 2004
- Preceded by: Stewart Greenleaf
- Succeeded by: Susan Cornell

Personal details
- Born: December 5, 1943 Abington, Pennsylvania, U.S.
- Died: January 1, 2004 (aged 60) Harrisburg, Pennsylvania, U.S.
- Party: Republican
- Education: Temple University

Roy W. Cornell (December 5, 1943 – January 1, 2004) was a Republican member of the Pennsylvania House of Representatives.

== Education ==
He was a 1961 graduate of Hatboro-Horsham High School and attended Santa Ana Junior College. He graduated from Temple University and from the North Philadelphia Board of Realtors School.

== Career ==
He was first elected to represent the 152nd legislative district in the Pennsylvania House of Representatives in 1978. He was the House Republican Caucus Secretary from 1993 to 1994 and was elected Republican Policy Chairman in 1997.

== Death ==
Cornell died on January 1, 2004, of a brain tumor.

== Legacy ==
In 2006, Pennsylvania Route 263 (York Road) through Hatboro was named the Roy W. Cornell Memorial Highway in his honor.
