= Tom Murt =

American politician

Thomas P. Murt
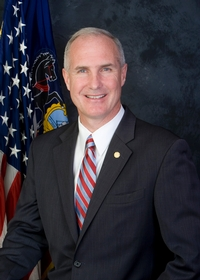

Member of the Pennsylvania House of Representatives from the 152nd district
- In office January 2, 2007 – November 30, 2020
- Preceded by: Sue Cornell
- Succeeded by: Nancy Guenst

Personal details
- Born: 1960 (age 65–66) Abington, Pennsylvania
- Party: Republican
- Spouse: Maria Murt
- Children: 3 children
- Education: Archbishop Wood High School; Penn State (BS); La Salle University (MA); Gwynedd Mercy University (Teacher Certificate); Temple University (EdD)

Military service
- Allegiance: United States
- Branch/service: U.S. Army Reserve
- Years of service: 1990—2008
- Rank: Staff Sergeant
- Unit: 656th Area Support Group, and 4th Infantry Division

Thomas P. Murt (born 1960) is a Republican former member of the Pennsylvania House of Representatives, representing the 152nd legislative district. He was first elected in 2006.

== Early life, education, and career ==
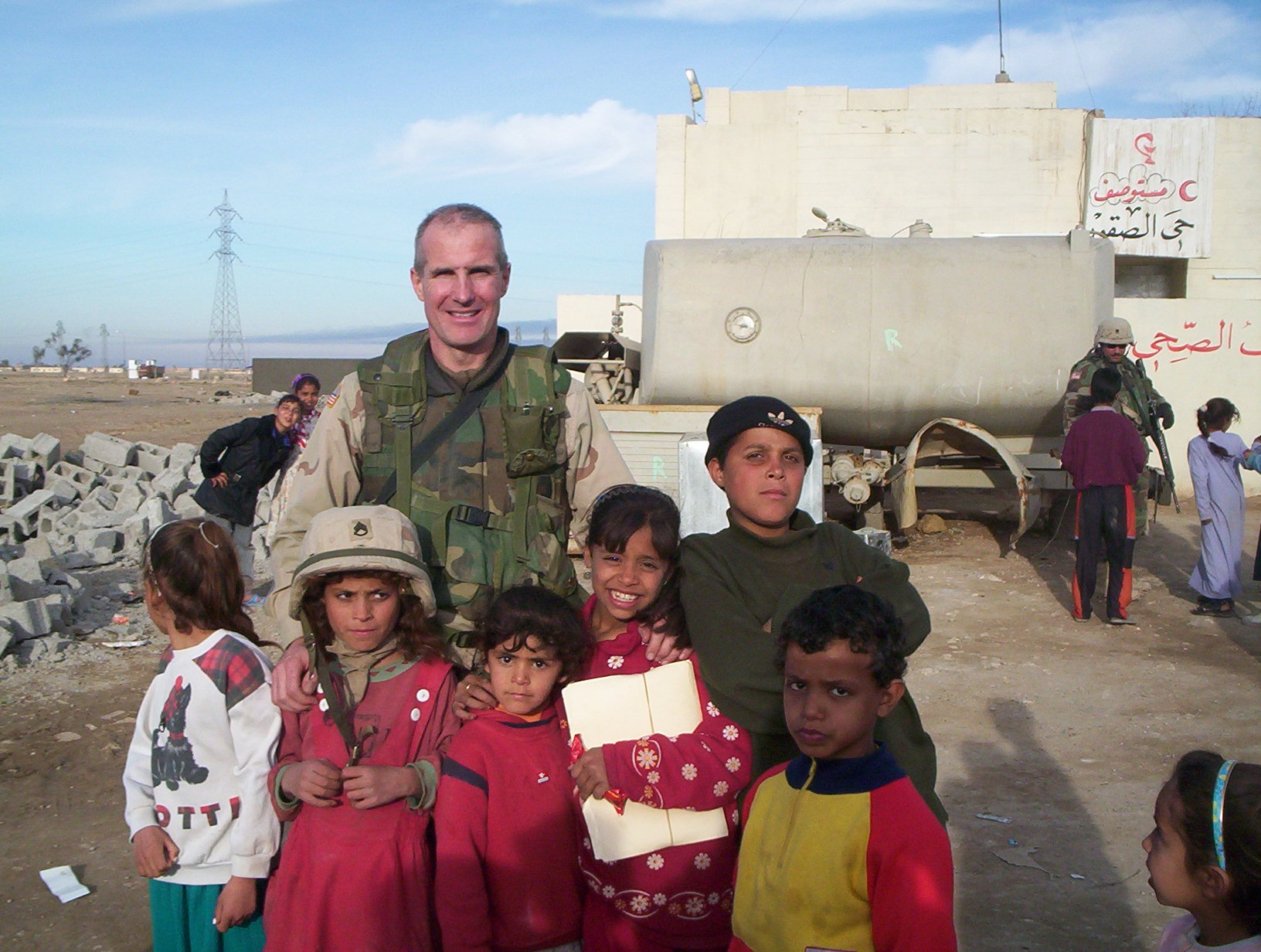
Representative Murt alongside Iraqi children

Tom Murt is a native of Hatboro, Pennsylvania, and graduated from Archbishop Wood High School. His wife, Maria Murt, received a Ph.D. from Widener University and is a professor of nursing at Widener University.

Murt has a bachelor's degree in economics from Penn State University and a master's degree in education from La Salle University. He also earned a Teaching Certificate from Gwynedd-Mercy College. He completed graduate economics coursework at Temple University and received a doctorate in education there.

Murt served in the U.S. Army Reserve from 1991 to 2009. In 2003, he was called to active duty and served for fourteen months with the U.S. Army's 4th Infantry Division in Iraq. Following his deployment in Operation: Iraqi Freedom, Murt returned to the U.S. Army Reserve with the 656th Area Support Group. Murt was nominated for the Army Commendation Medal and the Humanitarian Service Medal for outstanding service during Operation: Iraqi Freedom and Operation: Enduring Freedom.

Prior to elected office, he was assistant coordinator for the Counseling and Advising Center at Penn State Abington, where he currently teaches business classes part-time. Murt was elected to the Upper Moreland Township Board of Commissioners in 1993 and served for ten years but resigned after he was called to active duty in the Army. He also served on the board of the Upper Moreland School District.

== Athletic career ==
In 1983, Murt was appointed as the Head Wrestling Coach at La Salle University. He was only twenty-three at the time and was the youngest Division I Head Coach of any sport in the United States. Murt took over a program at LaSalle that had not won a dual meet in two seasons and had never won a tournament. As Head Coach, Murt led the team to seven victories in his first season. In his second year as Head Wrestling Coach at La Salle University, Murt led the program to its first ever winning season. During the 1985-86 season, Murt led the LaSalle Wrestling program to a record-setting fourteen-win season, a record that still stands. The season featured a dual-meet victory over Division I powerhouse Seton Hall University and a team championship at the Explorer Wrestling Classic Tournament held in Philadelphia. Murt resigned as Head Wrestling Coach at La Salle University when he was elected to the Upper Moreland School Board in 1989.

== Political career ==
In 2006, Murt ran for the Pennsylvania State House against incumbent Sue Cornell in the Republican primary. He benefited from voter anger over the 2005 legislative pay raise. Even though Cornell won the party endorsement and had support from other State Representatives Murt prevailed in the primary with 55% of the vote. Murt went on to defeat Democrat Michael Paston in the general election with 54% of the vote.

During the 2016 Pennsylvania House of Representative elections, Murt was re-elected to his seat after defeating Democratic nominee Albert J. DerMovsesian, Sr. Murt won his 2016 re-election with 64.22% of the vote.

In April 2019, Murt was named in an investigation by USA TODAY, The Arizona Republic and the Center for Public Integrity as having introduced or supported more model legislation than any other state legislator in the United States. According to the report, Murt introduced one bill and sponsored seventy-one others that "came from ALEC, its liberal counterpart ALICE, the State Innovation Exchange, Council of State Governments, Goldwater Institute and other groups that specialize in writing copycat bills". In response, Murt said he supports good legislation, whether it comes from a constituent, a colleague, or groups that advocate for causes he believes in.

In January 2020, Murt was named chairman of the House Human Services Committee by Speaker of the House Mike Turzai. He assumed this position after former chairman Gene DiGirolamo resigned.

In January 2020, Murt announced he would retire at the end of his current term and not seek reelection in 2020, wanting to spend "30 more years with my family and friends" and write a book about Harrisburg.

== Legislation ==
Murt authored a comprehensive update of Pennsylvania's Child Labor Law after holding numerous hearings.
