= Stewart Greenleaf =

American politician (1939–2021)

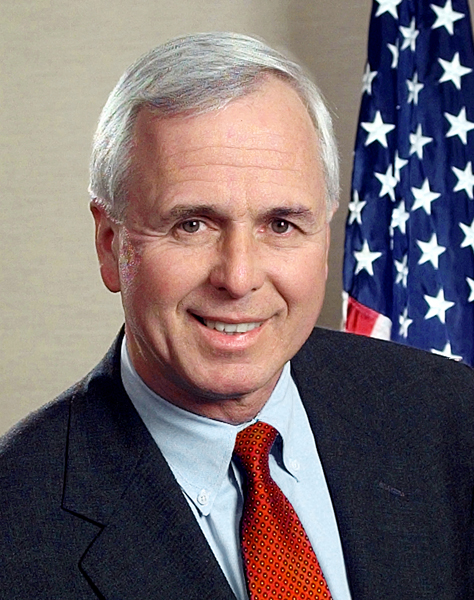

Member of the Pennsylvania Senate from the 12th district
- In office January 2, 1979 – January 1, 2019
- Preceded by: Wilmot Fleming
- Succeeded by: Maria Collett

Member of the Pennsylvania House of Representatives from the 152nd district
- In office January 4, 1977 – November 30, 1978
- Preceded by: Charlotte Fawcett
- Succeeded by: Roy Cornell

Personal details
- Born: Stewart John Greenleaf; October 4, 1939 Montgomery County, Pennsylvania, U.S.
- Died: February 9, 2021 (aged 81) Meadowbrook, Pennsylvania, U.S.
- Party: Republican
- Spouse: Kelly Greenleaf
- Education: University of Pennsylvania (BA); University of Toledo College of Law (JD)

Stewart John Greenleaf Sr. (October 4, 1939 – February 9, 2021) was an American politician and attorney who served as a member of the Pennsylvania State Senate from 1979 to 2019. Greenleaf represented the 12th District, which includes portions of eastern Montgomery County and southern Bucks County.

== Early life and education ==
Greenleaf is a 1961 graduate of the University of Pennsylvania and received his J.D. from the University of Toledo College of Law.

== Career ==
He served as an assistant district attorney in Montgomery County from 1970 to 1977 and as an assistant public defender in Bucks County.

In 1971, Greenleaf was elected as a Commissioner for his hometown of Upper Moreland Township, Pennsylvania. After one term, Greenleaf was elected to a seat in the Pennsylvania House of Representatives in 1976. He served a single term in the house before winning his bid for the State Senate in 1978. He was reelected seven times.

Greenleaf considered a run for U.S. Congress in 1993, briefly forming an exploratory committee to challenge Marjorie Margolies. However, he dropped out before the county endorsement convention. In 2000, Greenleaf ran for Congress against incumbent Joe Hoeffel. Greenleaf had represented much of the eastern portion of the congressional district for almost a quarter-century. Ultimately, Hoeffel won the race with nearly 53% of the vote to Greenleaf's 46%. Greenleaf did not have to give up his state senate seat to run for Congress; Pennsylvania state senators serve staggered four-year terms, and Greenleaf was not up for reelection until 2002.

In his last term, Greenleaf was Chairman of the Senate Judiciary Committee and served on the Appropriations, Banking & Insurance, Consumer Protection & Professional Licensure and Environmental Resources & Energy Committees.

Greenleaf chose not to run for re-election in 2018. He endorsed his son, former Montgomery County controller Stewart Greenleaf Jr., as his successor. However, Stewart Jr. was defeated by Democratic challenger Maria Collett.

Greenleaf continued to serve as a partner in his law firm, Elliott Greenleaf, whose attorneys include Montgomery County Commissioner Bruce Castor and former State Rep. Melissa Murphy Weber.

=== 2012 presidential election ===
Greenleaf signed up to be on the presidential ballot for the Republican Party's New Hampshire primary. He explained that he did so to focus the debate of the election on the balancing of the federal budget. He filed with the FEC on December 29, and received a total of 24 votes in the primary, 21st place amongst ballot candidates. He won four write-in votes in the Democratic primary, all of which he received in Canaan. Including other write-ins, this tied him with Mitt Romney for third place in the town, behind only Barack Obama and Ron Paul.

== Death ==
Greenleaf died at Holy Redeemer Hospital in Meadowbrook, Pennsylvania, on February 9, 2021, at age 81.
