= Jacob S. Haldeman =

American politician

Jacob Samils Haldeman (October 13, 1821 – November 1889) was an American banker, politician and ambassador from Pennsylvania who served as Minister Resident of the United States at Stockholm from 1861 to 1864. He also served as a Democratic-Republican member of the Pennsylvania House of Representatives from 1850 to 1851 and the Pennsylvania Senate for the 12th district from 1853 to 1856.

== Early life ==
Haldeman was born in Lancaster, Pennsylvania to Jacob Miller and Eliza Ewing. He worked as a farmer and a banker-financier.

== Political career ==
He served as a Democratic-Republican member of the Pennsylvania House of Representatives from 1850 to 1851 and the Pennsylvania Senate for the 12th district from 1853 to 1856.

== Ambassador to Sweden ==
In March 1861, Abraham Lincoln nominated Haldeman as Minister to Sweden and Norway following a suggestion by Simon Cameron.

In May 1861, Haldeman left his home in Harrisburg and traveled to Stockholm with his family. At his arrival in June 1861 he was greeted by the Swedish foreign minister who took the opportunity to express his government's sympathy for the Union cause. On June 14, 1861, Haldeman wrote that "from the limited opportunity I have had to judge, I have no hesitation in the declaration of opinion that the sympathy of the entire North of Europe is almost unanimously in favor of the existing government in the United States. The emigration of this part of Europe having been to the Northern or free States, they speak of it as if they would like to give active aid to their friends, relations, and countrymen. The public voice of the nation represented by a free press is clearly and emphatically in favor of my government."

During the course of the war, Haldeman sent reports to the United States Secretary of State, William H. Seward. The reports concerned immigration from the Scandinavian countries, rumors regarding Confederate activities in the kingdoms of Sweden and Norway and the attitudes of the Swedish people and government towards the Union. When it was rumored that Confederate representatives were seeking recognition from Sweden, Seward wrote to Haldeman: "The president confidentially relies upon your well-known vigilance and activity as well as upon the friendly disposition of the Swedish government to prevent the carrying into effect of any such design". Haldeman also suggested to Seward that the U.S. should open a consulate in Kristiania (Oslo) in Norway. He also played a role in helping a Swedish army officer to gain a commission in the Union army.

Haldeman's wife, Caroline Haldeman, frequently met with the famous Swedish author Fredrika Bremer, who described the minister's wife as "a lady of most uncommon sense, cleverness and knowledge of American affairs". During a visit to Norway Caroline bought a gift to Seward's daughter. During periods of his stay in Stockholm Haldeman was sick.

In early 1864 Haldeman was recalled from his post. Although he was an official U.S. diplomat, Haldeman spoke quite openly about his sympathies for the Confederacy, which may have been the reason for William Seward's dissatisfaction with him, according to a letter from Swedish foreign minister Ludvig Manderström to Swedish minister Count Piper in 1864.

Haldeman was replaced by James Hepburn Campbell, a fellow Pennsylvanian and outspoken abolitionist. In the fall of 1864 Haldeman had left Stockholm and traveled to Hamburg, en route for America, there he was arrested and imprisoned by Hamburg authorities. On 5 October, Haldeman was allowed to proceed on his journey. As a result of the treatment he received, he protested to the syndicus of foreign affairs.

Haldeman attempted to gain a new diplomatic post from Seward; in 1867 he wrote to Seward asking for a diplomatic mission to Europe. It is uncertain whether Haldeman was given any new posts; no further correspondence between Haldeman and Seward is preserved.

Haldeman died in 1889.

== Personal life ==
He was married to Caroline Rosina Hummel (1825-1905), with whom he had two daughters, Elizabeth and Anna Mary. They also had a third child, who died in infancy. During the inauguration of Abraham Lincoln both Jacob and Caroline were present.

Pennsylvania House of Representatives
Preceded by	Member of the Pennsylvania House of Representatives; 1850-1851	Succeeded by
Pennsylvania State Senate
Preceded by William Fisher Packer	Member of the Pennsylvania Senate, 12th district 1853-1856	Succeeded by Henry Johnson
Diplomatic posts
Preceded by Benjamin F. Angel	U.S. Ambassador to Sweden; 1861–1864	Succeeded by James Hepburn Campbell
