= Loller Academy =

- U.S. National Register of Historic Places
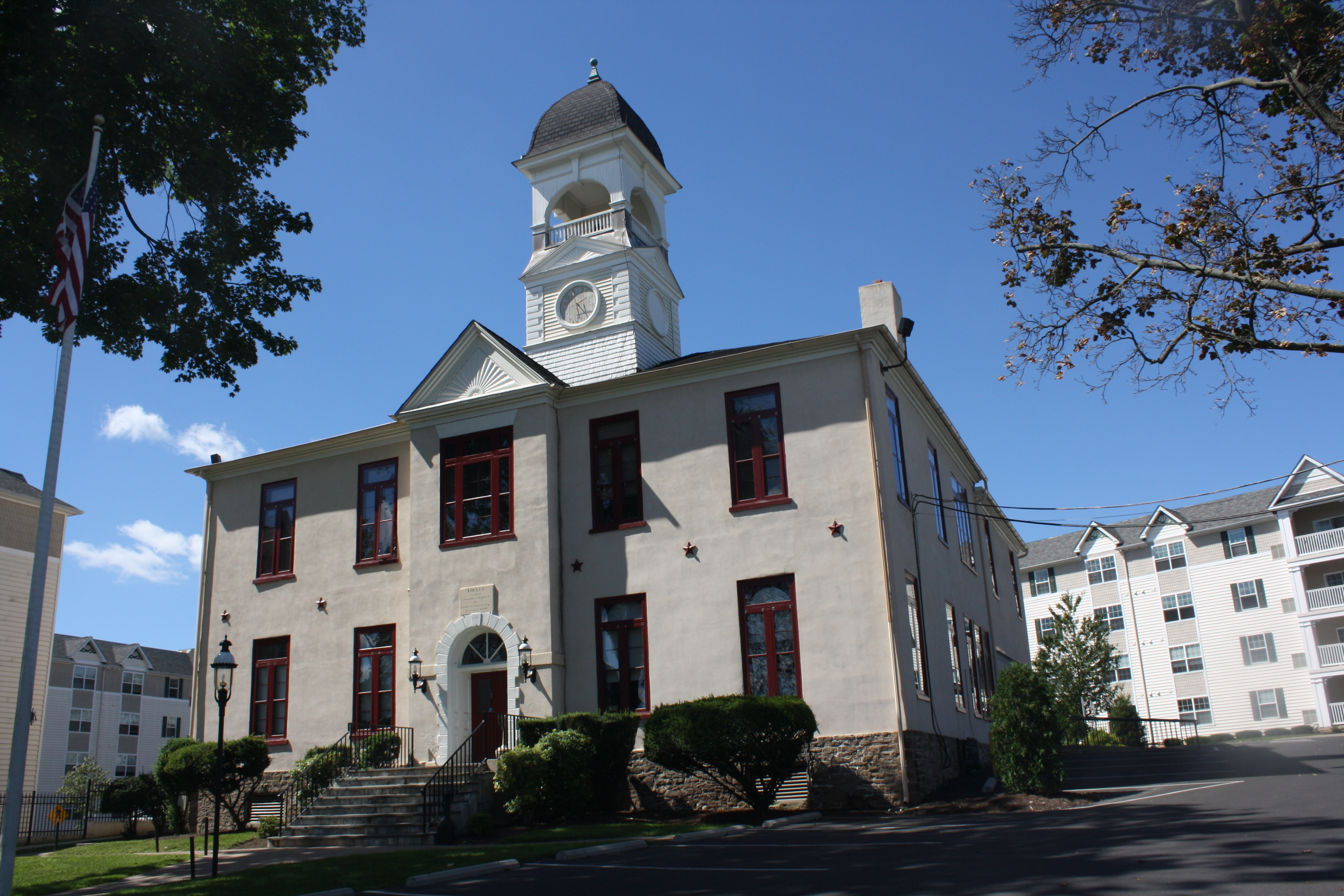
- Loller Academy in Hatboro. September 2012.

- Location within Pennsylvania Location within the United States
- Location: 424 S. York Rd., Hatboro, Pennsylvania
- Coordinates: 40°10′16″N 75°6′39″W
- Area: 1 acre (0.40 ha)
- Built: 1811
- NRHP reference No.: 78002435
- Added to NRHP: August 24, 1978

The Loller Academy is an historic school building in Hatboro, Montgomery County, Pennsylvania, United States.

Now the Borough Hall of the Borough of Hatboro, it was added to the National Register of Historic Places in 1978.

== History and architectural features ==
The original section was built in 1811, and is a two-story, stucco building measuring sixty-five feet wide by fifty-six feet long. It has a hipped roof and a forty-foot-square cupola. The building also has a later, two-story rear addition that measures twenty-four feet by seventy-two feet. The building features a belfry with clock, and housed a school until 1960.
