= Wilmot Fleming =

American politician

Wilmot E. Fleming

Member of the Pennsylvania Senate from the 12th district
- In office November 16, 1964 – May 20, 1978
- Preceded by: Morton Fetterolf
- Succeeded by: Stewart Greenleaf

Member of the Pennsylvania House of Representatives from the Montgomery County district
- In office January 1, 1963 – November 16, 1964

Personal details
- Born: December 20, 1916
- Died: May 20, 1978 (aged 61)

Wilmot E. Fleming (December 20, 1916 – May 20, 1978) was an American politician who served as a Republican member of the Pennsylvania House of Representatives for the Montgomery County district from 1963 to 1964 and the Pennsylvania State Senate for the 12th district from 1964 to 1978.

== Early life and education ==
Fleming was born in Philadelphia, Pennsylvania, to Wilmot and Lillie F. (Bains) Fleming. He graduated from Cheltenham Township High School and the Wharton School at the University of Pennsylvania.

== Business career ==
He worked in manufacturing as a partner in the Wilmot Fleming Engineering Company.

== Political career ==
He served as a member of the Pennsylvania House of Representatives for Montgomery County from 1963 to 1964. He was elected to the Pennsylvania State Senate for the 12th district in a special election and served from November 16, 1964 until his death in office due to a heart attack on May 20, 1978.

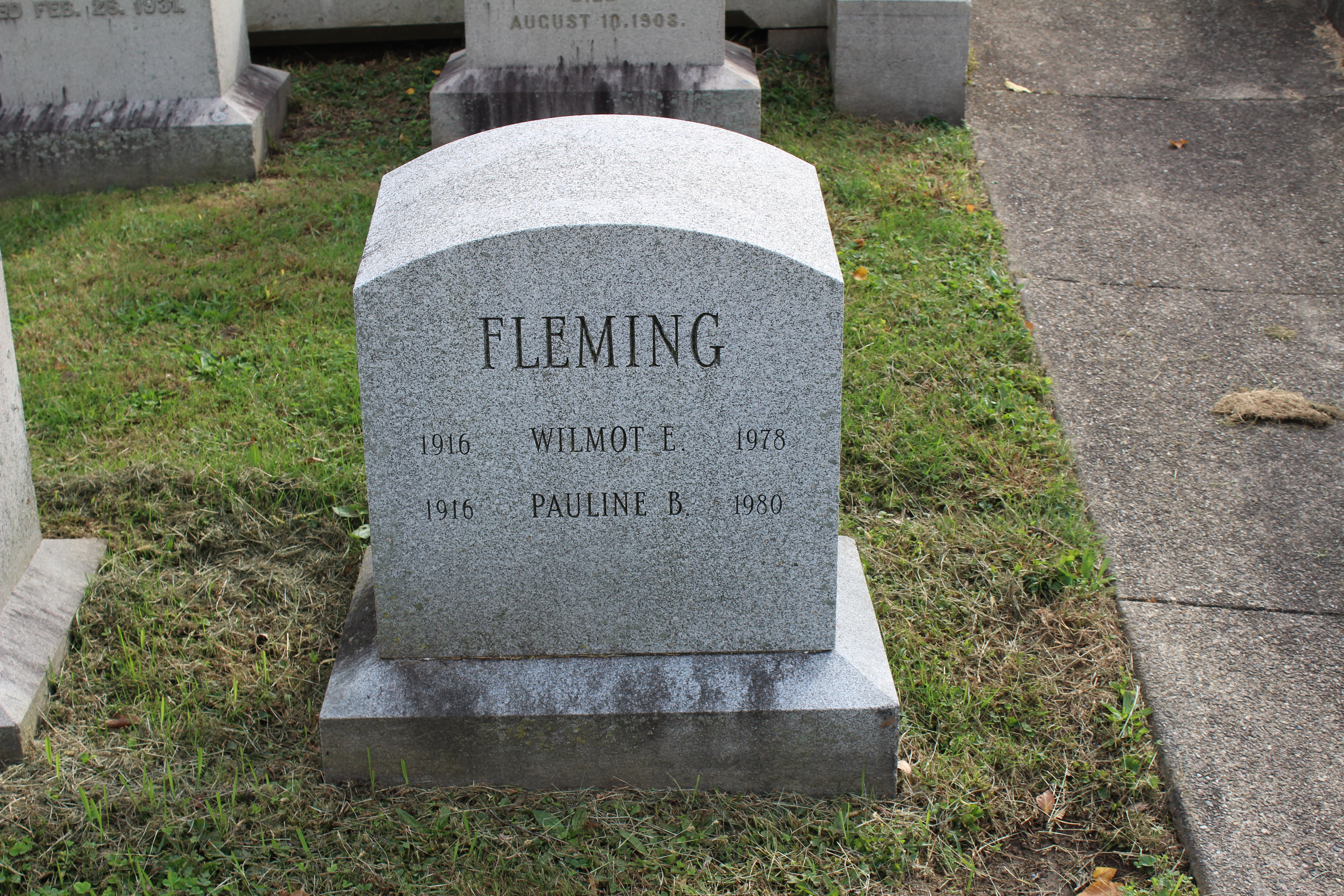
Wilmot E. Fleming tombstone in Laurel Hill Cemetery

He is interred at Laurel Hill Cemetery in Philadelphia, Pennsylvania.
