= Nancy Guenst =

American politician

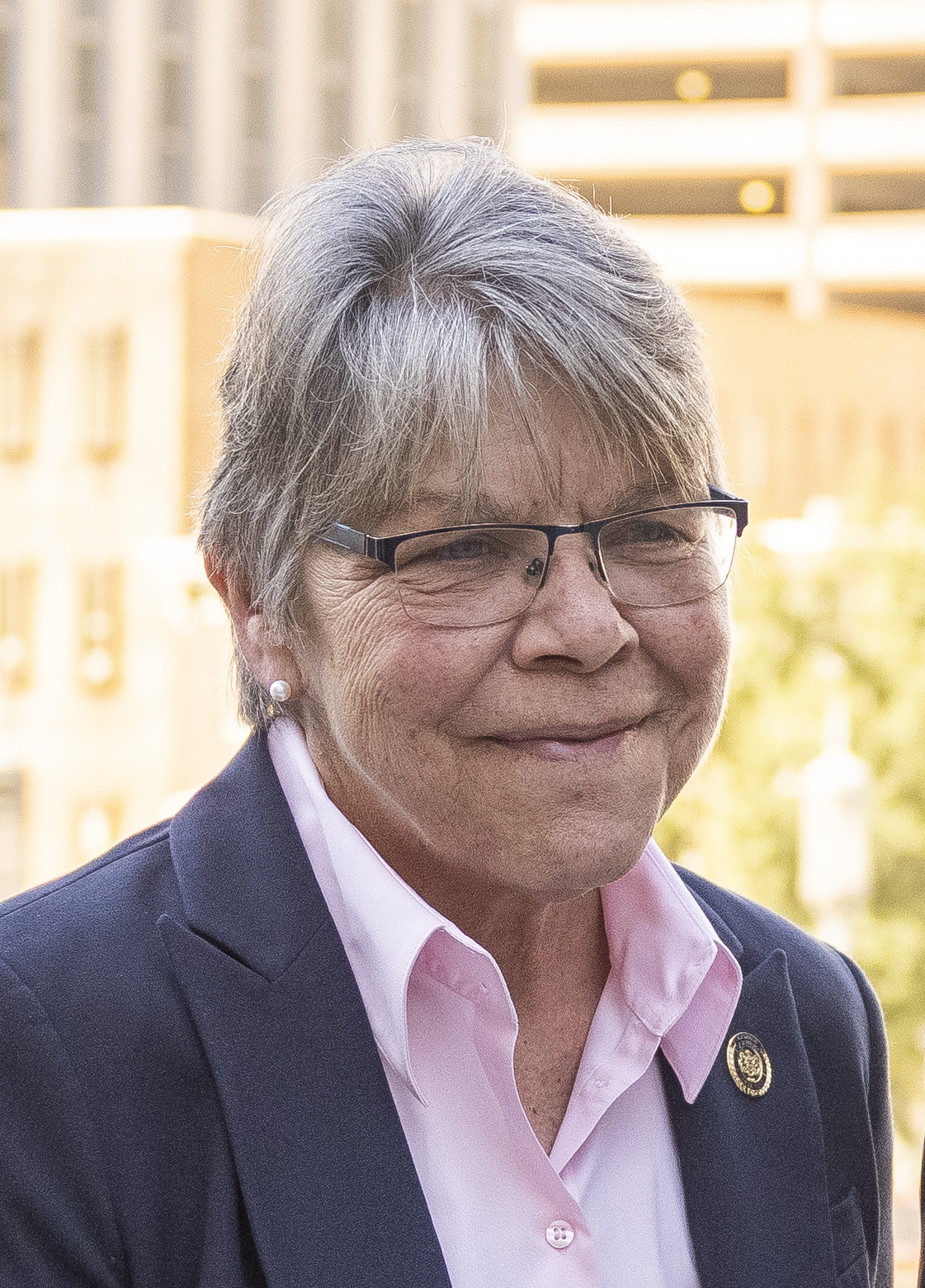

Member of the Pennsylvania House of Representatives from the 152nd district
- Incumbent
- Assumed office January 3, 2021
- Preceded by: Tom Murt

Personal details
- Born: Abington, Pennsylvania, U.S.
- Party: Democratic

Military service
- Branch/service: United States Army
- Years of service: 1977–1979

Nancy Guenst is an American politician serving as a member of the Pennsylvania House of Representatives from the 152nd district. Elected in November 2020, she assumed office on December 1, 2020.

== Early life and education ==
Guenst was born in Abington Township, Montgomery County, Pennsylvania. She attended Montgomery County Community College. From 1977 to 1979, Guenst served as an intelligence specialist and German linguist in the United States Army.

== Career ==
Guenst was the founder and owner of Designs In Stone, Inc., an engraving business based in Hatboro, Pennsylvania. She served as a member of the Hatboro Borough Council from 2006 to 2012 and as mayor from 2018 until 2020.

Guenst was elected to the Pennsylvania House of Representatives in November 2020 and assumed office on December 1, 2020. She currently sits on the Agriculture & Rural Affairs, Children & Youth, Game & Fisheries, and Human Services committees.
