= Union Library Company =

- U.S. National Register of Historic Places
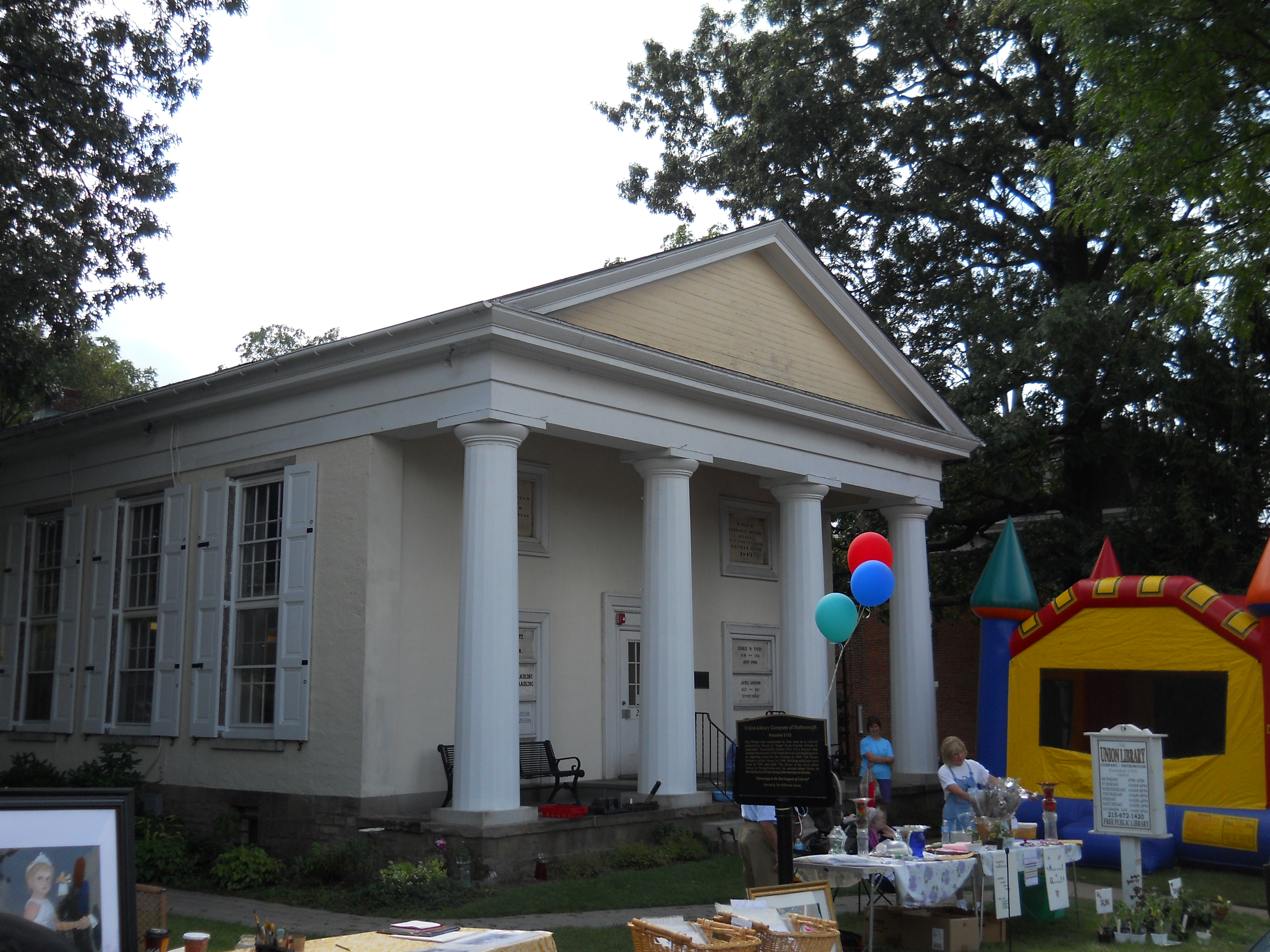
- Union Library Company in September 2012

- Location within Pennsylvania Location within the United States
- Location: 243 S. York Rd., Hatboro, Pennsylvania, U.S.
- Coordinates: 40.1753°N 75.1065°W
- Area: 1 acre (0.40 ha)
- Built: 1755, 1851
- Architect: Multiple
- Architectural style: Greek Revival
- NRHP reference No.: 80003579
- Added to NRHP: November 20, 1980

The Union Library Company is an historic library building in Hatboro, Pennsylvania, United States.

It was added to the National Register of Historic Places in 1980.

== History and architectural features ==
The Union Library Company was founded c. 1755, and is the third-oldest library in Pennsylvania. Built in 1851, this historic structure is a 2 1/2-story, rectangular, stuccoed stone building with a 2 1/2-story rear wing. The front facade features a colonnaded porch with four Doric order columns and was designed in the Greek Revival style. The rear wing has side porches.
