= Pennsylvania House of Representatives, District 152 =

American legislative district

Pennsylvania's 152nd State House of Representatives district
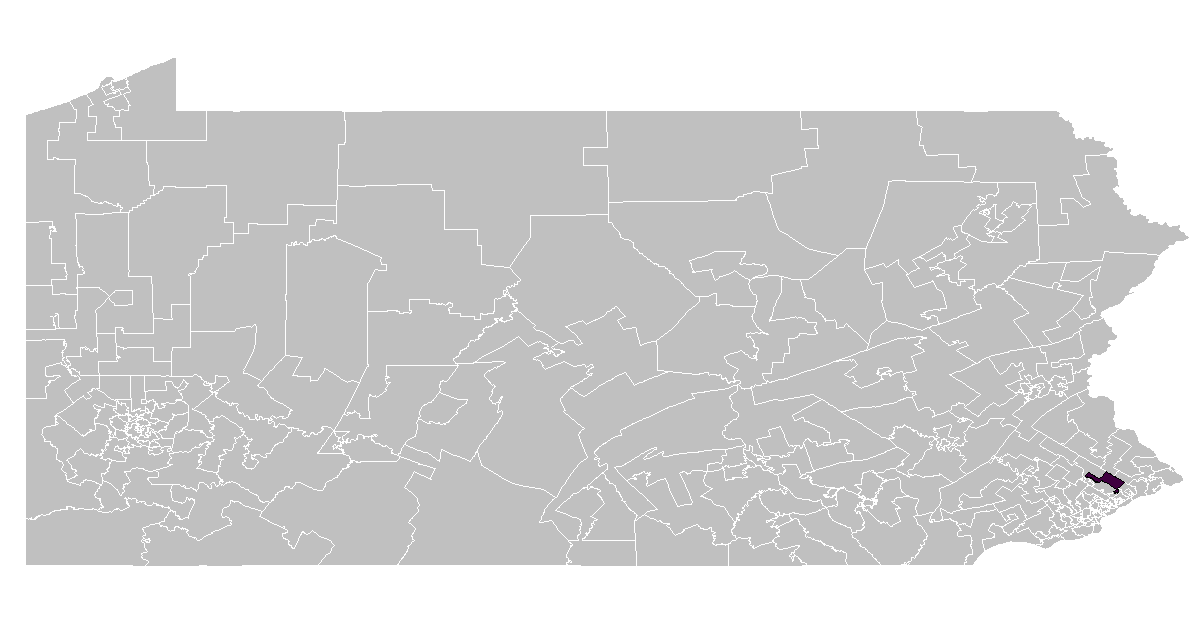
Representative
Nancy Guenst; D–Hatboro

The 152nd Pennsylvania House of Representatives District is located in Montgomery County and Philadelphia and includes the following areas:

- Montgomery County
  - Bryn Athyn
  - Hatboro
  - Lower Moreland Township
  - Upper Dublin Township (PART, Districts 03, 06 and 07)
  - Upper Moreland Township
- Philadelphia (PART, Ward 63 [PART, Divisions 16, 17, 18, 19, 20, 21 and 24])

== Representatives ==
Representative	Party	Years	District home	Note
Prior to 1969, seats were apportioned by county.
Charles G. Nicholson	Republican	1969 – 1970		
Charlotte D. Fawcett	Republican	1971 – 1976		
Stewart J. Greenleaf	Republican	1977 – 1978		
Roy W. Cornell	Republican	1979 – 2004		Died January 1, 2004.
Susan Cornell	Republican	2004 – 2006		Elected on March 9, 2004 to fill vacancy
Tom Murt	Republican	2007 – 2020	Hatboro	
Nancy Guenst	Democratic	2020 – present	Hatboro	Incumbent
