= Andrew Gregg Curtin =

American lawyer and politician (1815–1894)

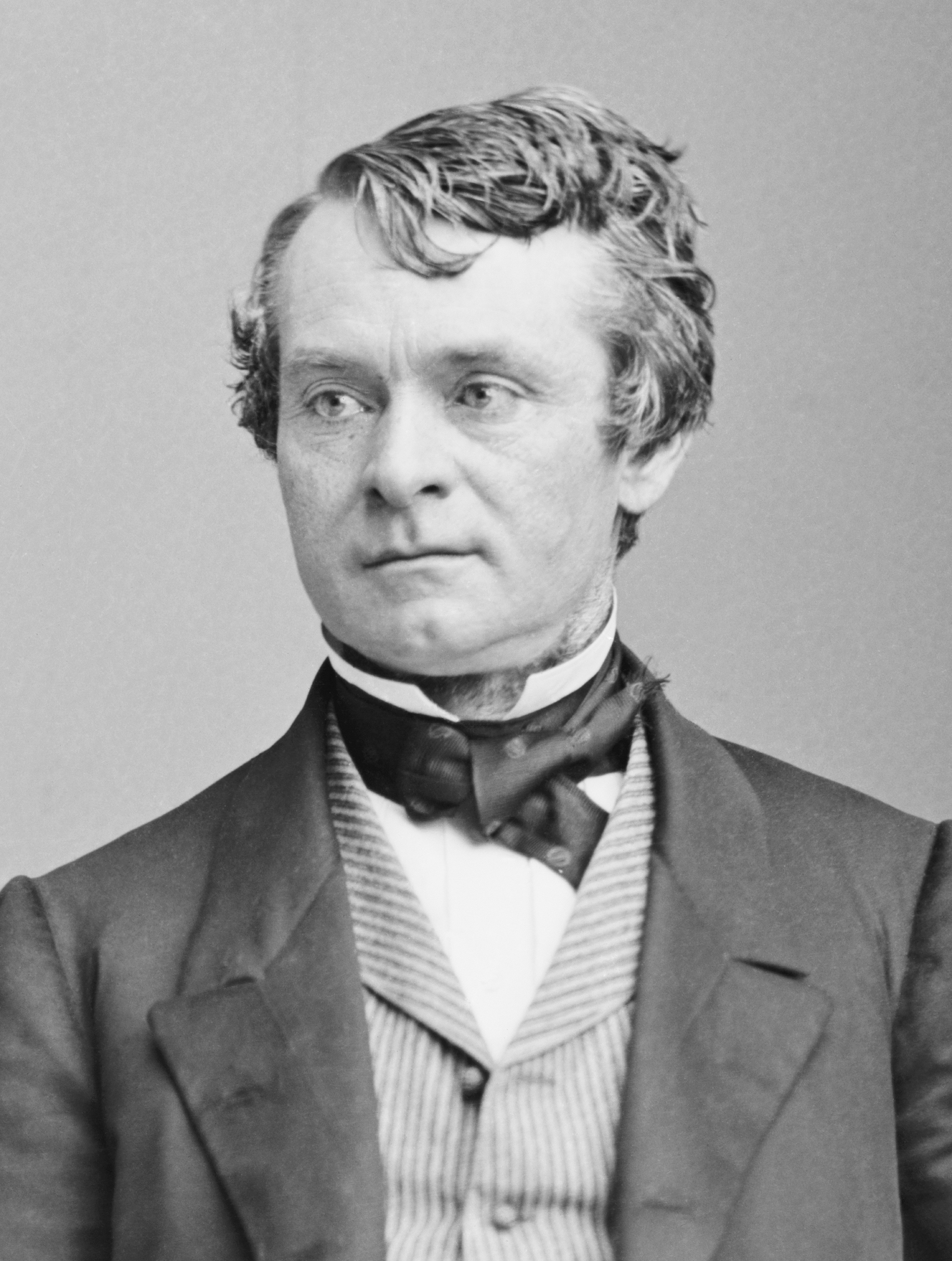
- Curtin between 1855 and 1865

15th Governor of Pennsylvania
- In office January 15, 1861 – January 15, 1867
- Preceded by: William F. Packer
- Succeeded by: John W. Geary

Member of the U.S. House of Representatives from Pennsylvania's 20th district
- In office March 4, 1881 – March 3, 1887
- Preceded by: Seth Hartman Yocum
- Succeeded by: John Patton

United States Ambassador to Russia
- In office October 28, 1869 – July 1, 1872
- President: Ulysses S. Grant
- Preceded by: Cassius Marcellus Clay
- Succeeded by: James Lawrence Orr

Personal details
- Born: April 22, 1815 or April 22, 1817 Bellefonte, Pennsylvania, U.S.
- Died: October 7, 1894 (aged 77 or 79) Bellefonte, Pennsylvania, U.S.
- Party: Whig, Republican, Democratic
- Spouse: Katharine Irvine Wilson
- Children: 5
- Profession: Politician, lawyer

Pennsylvania Historical Marker
- Designated: October 9, 1950
- Location: Bellefonte

Andrew Gregg Curtin (April 22, 1815 – October 7, 1894) was an American lawyer and politician. He served as the 15th governor of Pennsylvania during the American Civil War, helped defend his state during the Gettysburg campaign, and oversaw the creation of the National Cemetery and the ceremony in which Abraham Lincoln delivered his famous Gettysburg Address.

== Early life and education ==
Curtin was born in Bellefonte, Pennsylvania. Sources vary as to his birth date. Some list April 22, 1815; others list April 22, 1817. Curtin's gravestone uses the 1815 date. His parents were Roland Curtin Sr., a wealthy Irish-born iron manufacturer from County Clare, and Jane (née Gregg) Curtin, the daughter of U.S. Senator Andrew Gregg. Along with Miles Boggs, Curtin's father established Eagle Ironworks at Curtin Village in 1810.

Curtin's family was prominent in Pennsylvania politics and in the American Civil War. He was the great-grandson of James Potter, the vice president of Pennsylvania, and was the grandson of Andrew Gregg, a prominent Pennsylvania politician. He was the uncle of John I. Gregg and cousin of David McMurtrie Gregg, both Union generals in the Civil War. His cousin was Colonel John I. Curtin.

Curtin attended Bellefonte Academy, Dickinson College, and Dickinson School of Law.

== Career ==
After law school, Curtin began practicing law. He first entered politics during the 1840 election, campaigning for Whig presidential candidate William Henry Harrison.

In 1855, Pennsylvania governor James Pollock appointed Curtin Superintendent of Public Schools.

=== Governor of Pennsylvania ===
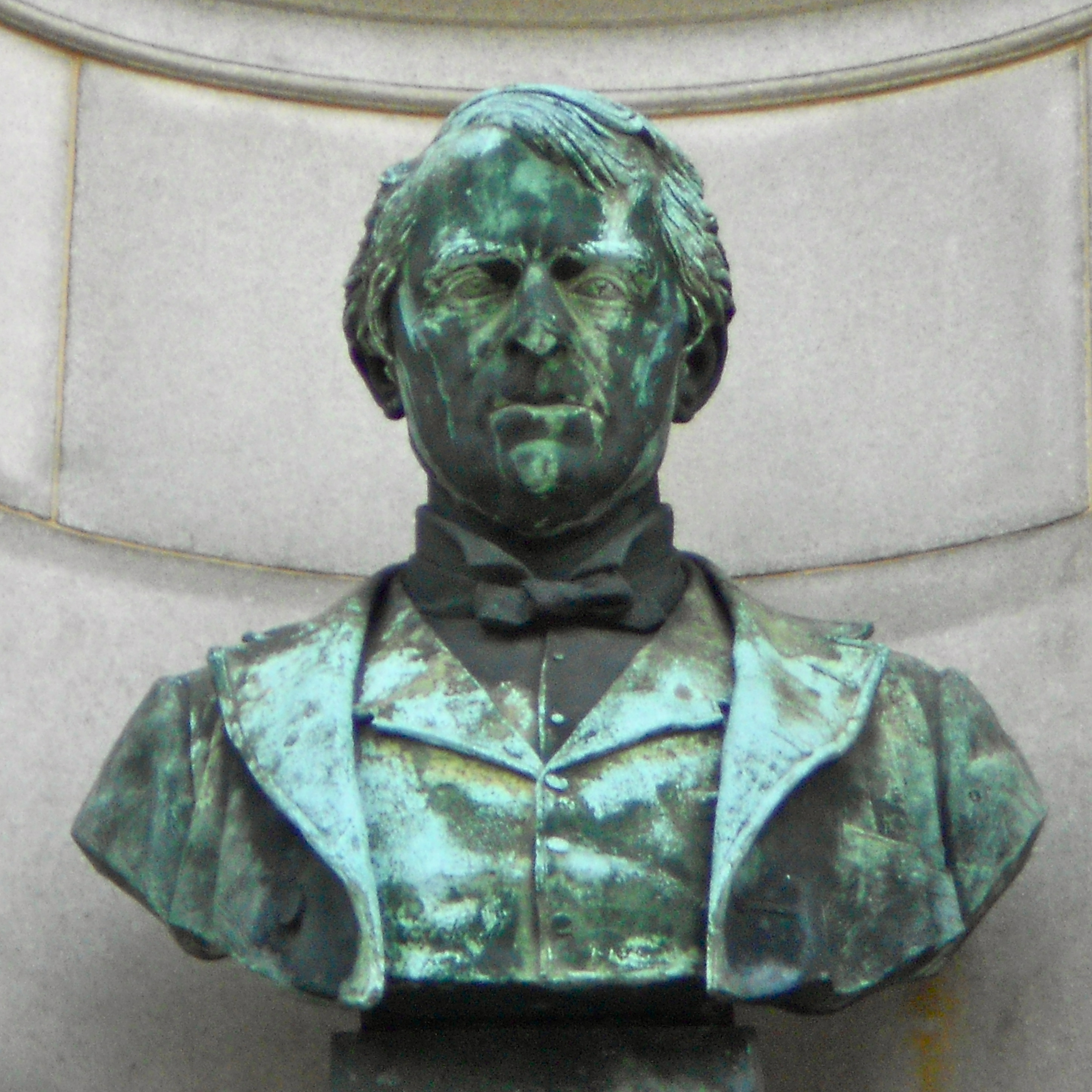
Bust of Andrew Gregg Curtin, a 1912 statue by Moses Jacob Ezekiel on display at Smith Memorial Arch in Philadelphia

With the collapse of the Whig Party, Curtin switched to the newly formed Republican Party and successfully ran for governor of Pennsylvania in 1860. At the same time, he helped Abraham Lincoln win the Republican nomination for president. A large crowd attended Curtin's inaugural ceremonies on January 15, 1861.

Curtin was a strong supporter of President Lincoln's policies in the Civil War, and Curtin committed Pennsylvania to the war effort, which he presumed would be over in a matter of three months. Curtin organized the Pennsylvania Reserves into combat units, and oversaw the construction of the first Union military camp for training militia. It opened in an agricultural school nearby Harrisburg as Camp Curtin on April 18, 1861, and more than 300,000 men were drilled there during 4 years. In the years that followed, Curtin became a close friend and confidant of Abraham Lincoln, visiting the White House several times in order to converse about the status of the war effort.

Curtin was very active during the Gettysburg Campaign, working with Major General Darius N. Couch and Major Granville O. Haller to delay Robert E. Lee's Army of Northern Virginia and prevent it from crossing the Susquehanna River. Major General George G. Meade, a Pennsylvania officer whom Curtin had recommended for brigadier general and command of one of the Pennsylvania reserve brigades in 1861, defeated Lee in the Battle of Gettysburg.

Following the Battle of Gettysburg, Governor Curtin was the principal force behind the establishment of the National Cemetery there. Through his agent, David Wills, Curtin persuaded President Abraham Lincoln to attend the dedication of the cemetery. Governor Curtin was sitting with Lincoln on the platform on November 19, 1863, when Lincoln delivered his famed Gettysburg Address.

In his first term, Governor Curtin suffered a severe breakdown from the stresses of war. Secretary of State Eli Slifer handled governmental affairs during the increasingly frequent periods when Curtin was incapacitated. President Lincoln offered the governor a diplomatic position abroad, but he chose to run for reelection in 1863.

To coordinate Union war efforts, Curtin convened the Loyal War Governors' Conference on September 24 and 25, 1862, in Altoona. This event was one of his most significant contributions to the Union war effort. He formed the Pennsylvania State Agency in Washington, and another branch in Nashville, Tennessee, to provide support for wounded soldiers on the battlefield and returned home. He also founded the state-funded Orphan's School to aid and educate children of military men who had died for the Union cause.

Soon after the war, Curtin was elected to the honorary position of a 3rd Class Companion of the Military Order of the Loyal Legion of the United States in recognition of his support for the Union during the war.

As governor, from 1858 to 1860, Curtin also served as president of the Tyrone and Clearfield Railroad.

=== Ambassador to Russia ===
After the Civil War, Curtin lost his party's Senate nomination to Simon Cameron, and was appointed Ambassador to Russia by President Ulysses S. Grant.

=== U.S. Representative ===
Curtin later switched to the Democratic Party, and served as a U.S. Representative from 1881 until 1887.

== Personal life ==
On May 30, 1844, Curtin was married to Katharine Irvine Wilson (1821–1903), a daughter of Dr. William Irvine Wilson and Mary (née Potter) Wilson. Together, they were the parents of:

- Mary Curtin (1845–1927), who married George Fairlamb Harris.
- Martha Irvin Curtin (1848–1935), who married Captain Kidder Randolph Breese.
- Myron Stanley Curtin (1854–1857), who died young.
- Katherine Irvine Wilson Curtin (1859–1930), who married Moses Dewitt Burnet.
- Bessie Elliott Curtin (1865–1866), who died young.

== Death ==
Curtin died at his birthplace on October 7, 1894, in Bellefonte, Pennsylvania, and is buried there in Union Cemetery.

== Legacy ==
The World War II Liberty Ship SS Andrew G. Curtin was named in his honor.

== Notes ==
Party political offices
Preceded by David Wilmot	Republican nominee for Governor of Pennsylvania; 1860, 1863	Succeeded by John W. Geary
Political offices
Preceded by William Packer	Governor of Pennsylvania; 1861–1867	Succeeded by John W. Geary
Diplomatic posts
Preceded by Cassius Marcellus Clay	United States Ambassador to Russia; 1869–1872	Succeeded by James Lawrence Orr
U.S. House of Representatives
Preceded by Seth Hartman Yocum	Member of the U.S. House of Representatives from Pennsylvania's 20th congressional district 1881–1887	Succeeded by John Patton
