= Susan Cornell =

American politician

Susan E. Cornell

Member of the Pennsylvania House of Representatives from the 152nd district
- In office March 23, 2004 – November 30, 2006
- Preceded by: Roy Cornell
- Succeeded by: Tom Murt

Personal details
- Born: July 26, 1971 (age 55) Hatboro, Pennsylvania, U.S.
- Party: Republican
- Education: Temple University

Susan E. Cornell (born July 26, 1971) is a former Republican member of the Pennsylvania House of Representatives.

She earned a degree in history from Temple University in 2000.

She was first elected to represent the 152nd legislative district in the Pennsylvania House of Representatives in a special election on March 9, 2004 to fill the remainder of her late father's term.
