= 1863 Pennsylvania gubernatorial election =

- October 13, 1863
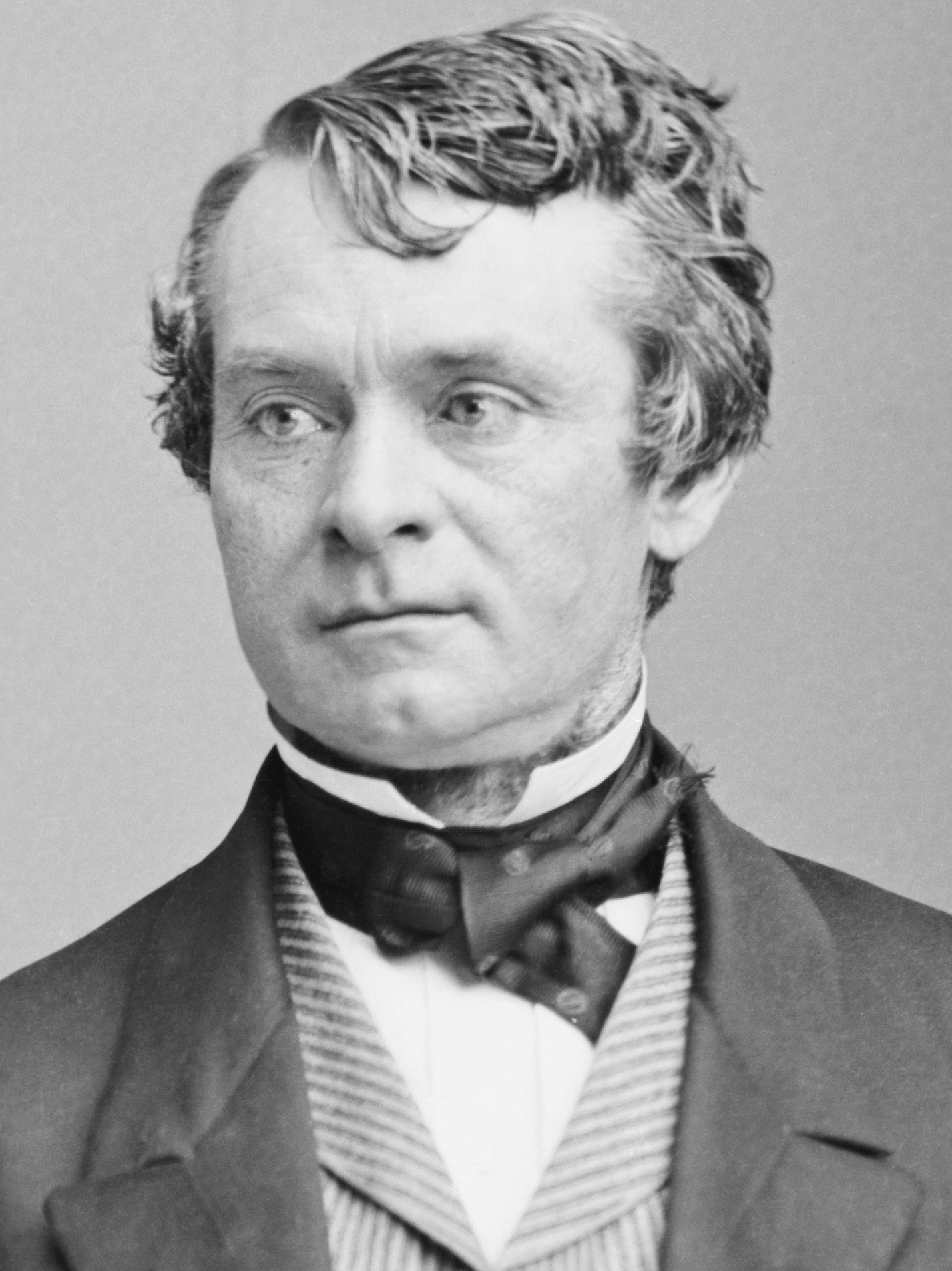

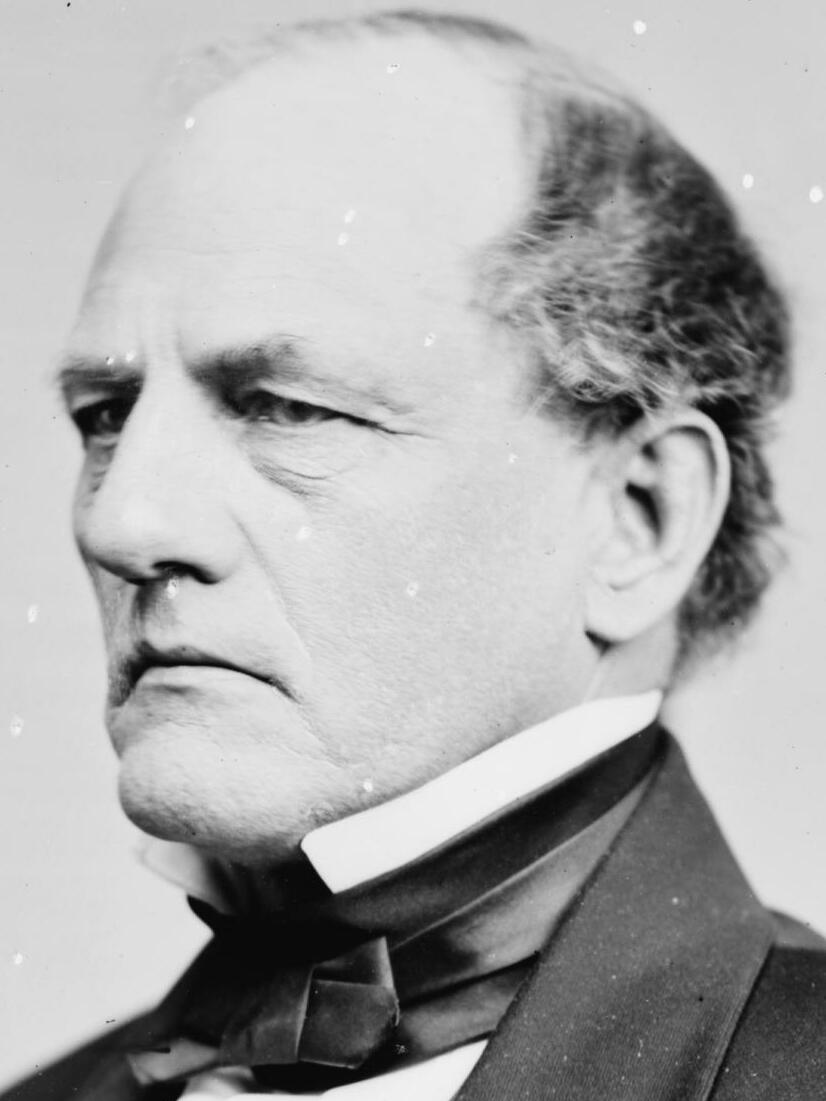
Nominee	Andrew Gregg Curtin	George Washington Woodward
Party	National Union	Democratic
Popular vote	269,506	254,171
Percentage	51.46%	48.54%
- County results Curtin: 50–60% 60–70% 70–80% Woodward: 50–60% 60–70% 70–80% 80–90%
Governor before election
Andrew Gregg Curtin
Republican
Elected Governor
Andrew Gregg Curtin
National Union

The 1863 Pennsylvania gubernatorial election occurred on October 13, 1863. The Union incumbent governor Andrew Gregg Curtin defeated the Democratic candidate George Washington Woodward.

Pennsylvania's 15th governor and a strong supporter of President Abraham Lincoln, Curtin was first inaugurated on January 15, 1861, and ultimately became known as "Pennsylvania's War Governor" because he was governor when the American Civil War broke out and then continued to serve as governor for the duration of the war. In April 1861, he had been one of the first state governors to send military units to Washington, D.C. in response to Lincoln's call for help to defend the nation's capital and was the eponym of Camp Curtin, which became one of the largest staging grounds for the Union Army after it opened that same month. Following the Battle of Gettysburg, which had been waged on Pennsylvania soil barely three months before Curtin's reelection and helped turn the tide of the war in favor of preserving the Union, Curtin led the state and nation in establishing a national cemetery for the Union Army's fallen soldiers. Post-war, he led the commonwealth in building a state-funded system of more than forty soldiers' orphans' schools to educate and care for children across Pennsylvania whose fathers had been killed during the war.

== Results ==
Pennsylvania gubernatorial election, 1863
Party	Candidate	Votes	%
National Union	Andrew Gregg Curtin (incumbent)	269,506	51.46
Democratic	George Washington Woodward	254,171	48.54
N/A	Others	2	0.00
Total votes		523,679	100.00
