= 1857 Pennsylvania gubernatorial election =

- October 13, 1857
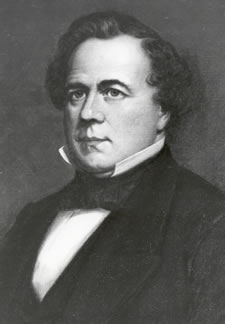

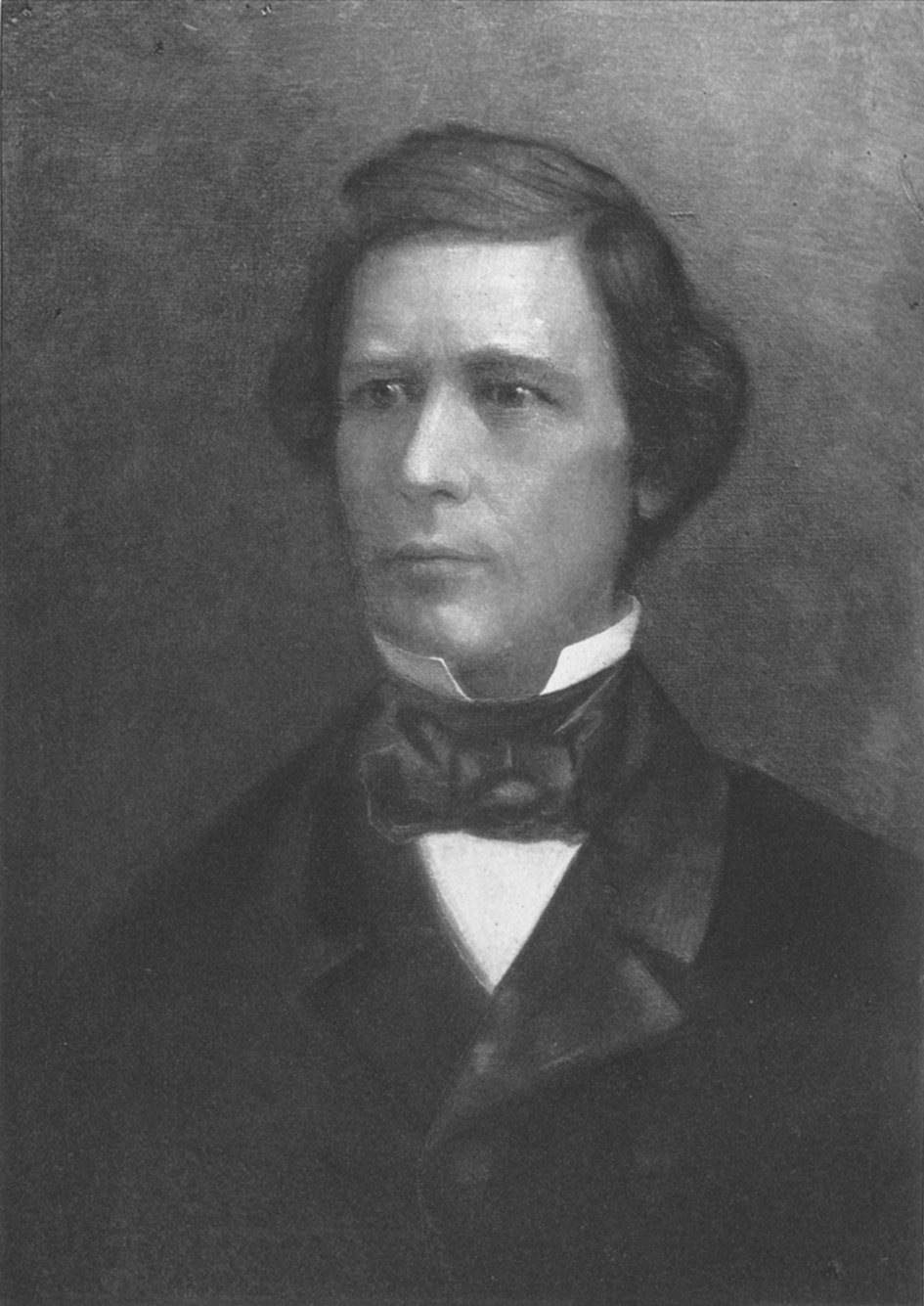

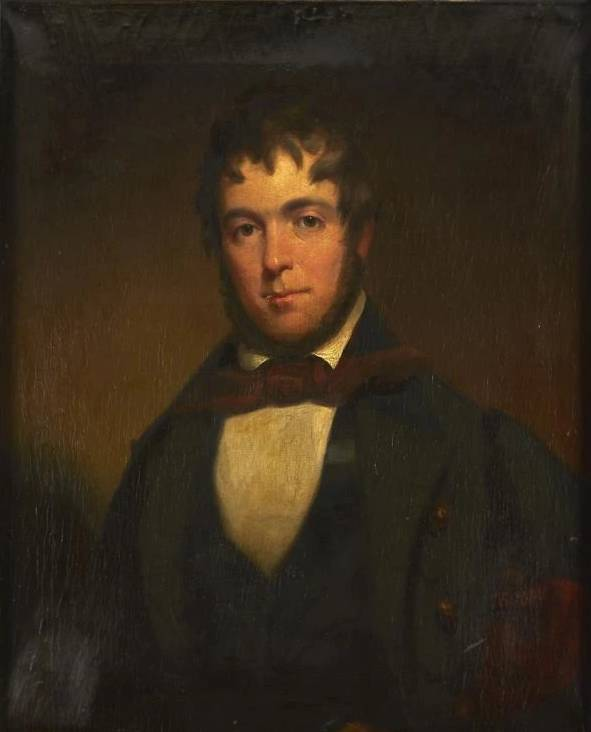
Nominee	William F. Packer	David Wilmot	Isaac Hazlehurst
Party	Democratic	Republican	Know Nothing
Popular vote	188,846	146,139	28,168
Percentage	52.00%	40.24%	7.76%
- County results Packer: 40–50% 50–60% 60–70% 70–80% 80–90% Wilmot: 40–50% 50–60% 60–70% 70–80%
Governor before election
James Pollock
Whig
Elected Governor
William F. Packer
Democratic

The 1857 Pennsylvania gubernatorial election occurred on October 13, 1857. Incumbent governor James Pollock, a Whig, was not a candidate for re-election. Democratic candidate William F. Packer defeated Republican candidate David Wilmot and American Party candidate Isaac Hazlehurst to become Governor of Pennsylvania.

== Results ==
Pennsylvania gubernatorial election, 1857
Party	Candidate	Votes	%
Democratic	William F. Packer	188,846	52.00
Republican	David Wilmot	146,139	40.24
Know Nothing	Isaac Hazlehurst	28,168	7.76
Total votes		363,153	100.00
