= William F. Packer =

American politician (1807–1870)

William Fisher Packer
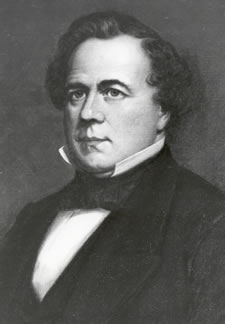

14th Governor of Pennsylvania
- In office January 19, 1858 – January 15, 1861
- Preceded by: James Pollock
- Succeeded by: Andrew Gregg Curtin

7th Auditor General of Pennsylvania
- In office 1842–1845
- Governor: David R. Porter
- Preceded by: George R. Espy
- Succeeded by: John N. Purviance

Member of the Pennsylvania House of Representatives
- In office 1847

Member of the Pennsylvania Senate for the 12th district
- In office 1851–1852
- Preceded by: Henry Fulton
- Succeeded by: Jacob Samils Haldeman

Personal details
- Born: April 2, 1807 Howard, Pennsylvania, US
- Died: September 27, 1870 (aged 63) Williamsport, Pennsylvania, US
- Party: Democratic
- Spouse: Mary W. Vanderbilt (m. 1829–?)
- Children: 10

William Fisher Packer (April 2, 1807 – September 27, 1870) was an American politician from Pennsylvania who served as the 14th governor of Pennsylvania from 1858 to 1861.

== Early and personal life ==
Packer was born in Howard, Pennsylvania to James and Charity Packer. When William was seven years old, his father died, leaving him and his four siblings to help run the house.

At the age of 13 he began work as a printer's apprentice at the Sunbury Public Inquirer and later at the Bellefonte Patriot. He also worked as a journeyman at Simon Cameron's newspaper the Pennsylvania Intelligencer in Harrisburg.

Packer studied law in Williamsport, Pennsylvania, under future member of Congress Joseph Biles Anthony but did not practice, choosing instead to stay in the newspaper business. In 1829 he purchased a controlling share and became the editor of the Lycoming Gazette which he published until 1836. While working at the Lycoming Gazette, he began an early foray into politics as a major supporter of the construction of the West Branch of the Pennsylvania Canal. The state legislators in Philadelphia had opposed funding the construction and Packer penned an address to Philadelphia to raise public support for the project. The campaign worked and the Philadelphia delegation reversed their position to support the canal.

Packer married Mary W. Vanderbilt on December 24, 1829. The couple had ten children.

== Entry into politics ==
Packer's support for the canal did not go unnoticed and in 1832, he was appointed by the Canal Commission to serve as Superintendent of the canals. The position was abolished in 1835 and Packer spent most of that year working for the re-election of Governor George Wolf and running for the Pennsylvania State Senate. A schism in the Democratic Party cost Wolf re-election and Packer a Senate seat.

In 1836, Packer co-founded The Keystone, a Democratic newspaper published in Harrisburg. Packer, through the Keystone, was a supporter of David R. Porter for Governor against Joseph Ritner in the election of 1838. His support of Porter's successful bid helped him earn an appointment to the Board of Canal Commissioners, a powerful post at the time. After he was re-elected, Porter appointed Packer to the post of Pennsylvania Auditor General in 1842.

After an unsuccessful bid for the Pennsylvania House of Representatives in 1845, Packer won a seat in Pennsylvania House of Representatives in 1847 and served as Speaker of the House in 1848 and 1849. Packer won re-election in 1848 and then served as a member of the Pennsylvania State Senate for the 12th district from 1851 to 1852.

In the State Senate, Packer was an ardent supporter of railroad development in Central Pennsylvania, working towards the establishment of the Susquehanna Railroad. At the time, state policy was to restrain railroad development in southern Pennsylvania which would benefit Baltimore rather than Philadelphia. The act to authorize the railroad connected the York and Cumberland Railroad to cities like Williamsport and Sunbury and increased their access to regional trade. In 1852, Packer became the first President of the Susquehanna, stepping aside after the line was consolidated into the Northern Central Railway.

During the 1856 Presidential Election, friend and fellow Pennsylvanian James Buchanan ran for the Democratic nomination against incumbent Franklin Pierce and Senator Stephen Douglas. Packer worked hard for his nomination and election. Buchanan won the nomination at the 1856 Democratic National Convention in Cincinnati, Ohio, and went on to win the Presidency over Republican John C. Frémont and Know Nothing candidate and former President Millard Fillmore.

== Governor ==
In 1857, Packer was nominated as the Democratic Party Candidate for Governor. He was opposed by David Wilmot, author of the Wilmot Proviso which aimed to ban the expansion of slavery to territories acquired from Mexico, and Isaac Hazlehurst of the Native American Party. The Panic of 1857 had crippled the nation's economy, including the Pennsylvania iron industry. With strong support for tariffs in more normal times, the Panic increased Pennsylvania's support for high tariffs, a stance which hurt the pro-free trade Wilmot. The question of the day, however, remained the issue of slavery in Kansas. Packer forwarded a letter to his friend, President Buchanan, supporting the Kansas-Nebraska Act, but opposing an expansion of slavery in that state without a free and open process. The split of the Republicans and Know Nothings made it difficult to defeat the united Democrats and Packer swept into office.

A large crowd attended his inaugural ceremonies on January 19, 1858.

In dealing with the economic crisis caused by the Panic, Packer vehemently blamed banks and the free issue of paper money over gold and silver coinage. As part of a recovery plan, the Governor approved legislation to requiring state banks to limit the issue of paper currency to amounts covered by real security deposited with the state.

In 1859, Packer sought to end the state's involvement in construction and management of canals and railroads, selling off the state's investments to the Sunbury and Erie Railroad.

Governor Packer was a proponent of public schools and supported the new public school system with funds for teacher training. Packer also used his veto power to stop attacks on the new public education system by forces in the legislature.

As his term came to an end, southern states had begun seceding from the union. Packer recommended that the nation's differences be addressed in a national convention. He opposed secession and, in his final address to the General Assembly, he stated, "It is therefore clear, that there is no Constitutional right of secession. Secession is only another form of nullification. Either, when attempted to be carried out by force, is rebellion, and should be treated as such, by those whose sworn duty it is to maintain the supremacy of the Constitution and laws of the United States."

Packer retired from public life after the end of his term and died September 27, 1870, in Williamsport. He is interred at Williamsport Cemetery.

== Places named for William F. Packer ==
Packer Park - A neighborhood along Packer Avenue in South Philadelphia.

Packer Hall - A residence hall on the University Park campus of the Pennsylvania State University.

Packer Street Williamsport PA

== See also ==
- Speaker of the Pennsylvania House of Representatives

Party political offices
Preceded by William Bigler	Democratic nominee for Governor of Pennsylvania; 1857	Succeeded by Henry Donnel Foster
Political offices
Preceded by James Pollock	Governor of Pennsylvania; 1858–1861	Succeeded by Andrew Gregg Curtin
