= Maria Collett =

American politician (born 1974)

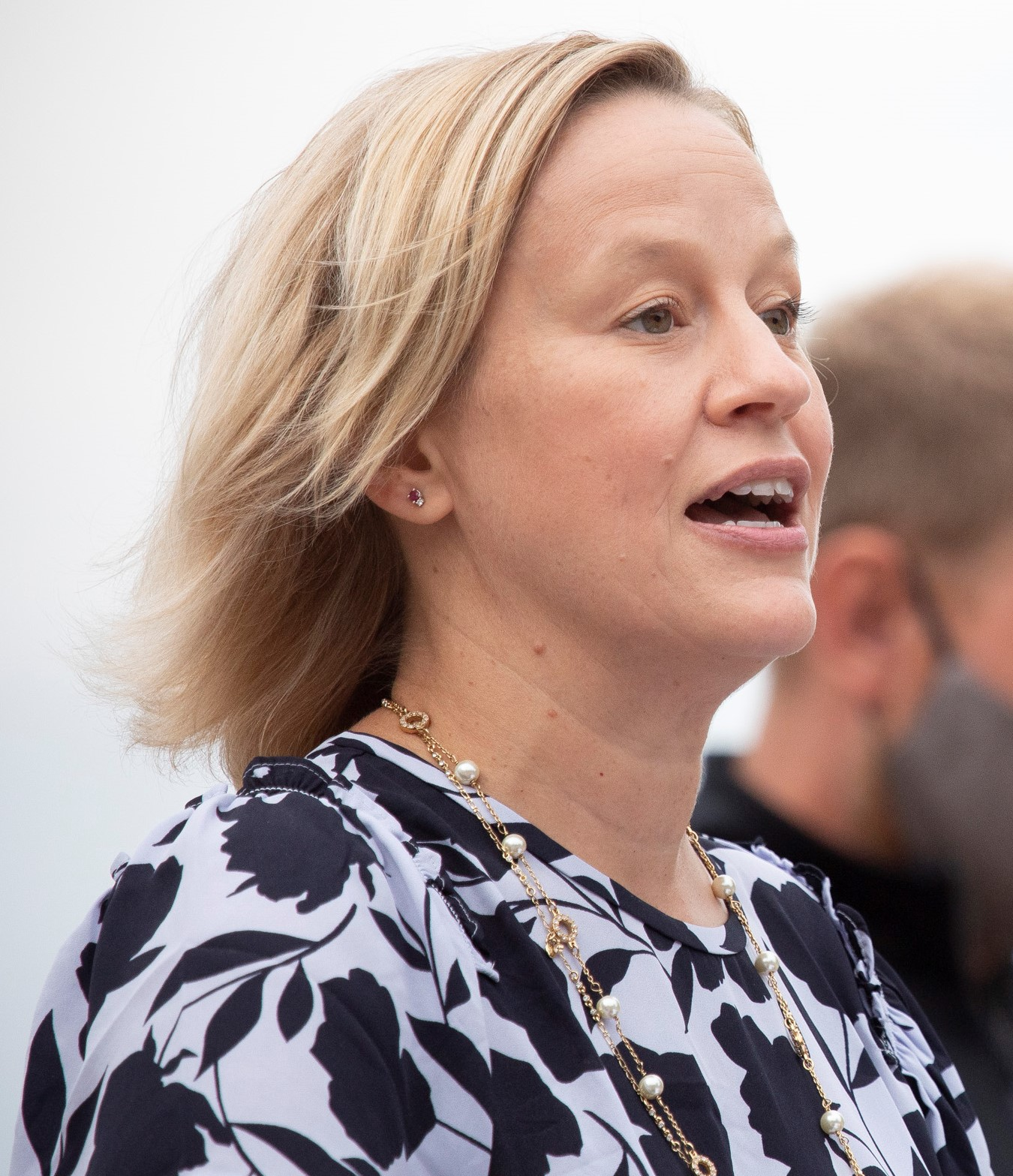

Member of the Pennsylvania Senate from the 12th district
- Incumbent
- Assumed office January 1, 2019
- Preceded by: Stewart Greenleaf

Personal details
- Born: July 21, 1974 (age 52) Athens, Greece
- Party: Democratic
- Spouse: Len Collett
- Education: University of Maryland, College Park (BA); Rutgers University, Camden (JD); Drexel University (BS)
- Website: Official website

Maria Collett (born July 21, 1974) is a Greek-born American politician serving as a Democratic member of the Pennsylvania State Senate who represents the 12th District. Her district includes portions of eastern Montgomery County and southern Bucks County. Collett is the first Greek American woman to serve in the Pennsylvania State Senate.

== Political career ==
=== Elections ===
==== 2018 ====
In 2018, Collett ran unopposed in the Democratic primary for the election to succeed retiring state senator Stewart Greenleaf, who had represented the 12th District since 1979. Collett defeated Stewart Greenleaf Jr., Greenleaf's son and a former controller for Montgomery County, in the November 6 general election. Her victory was part of the "blue wave" that increased Democratic and female representation in the Pennsylvania General Assembly and Congressional delegation.

=== Committee assignments ===
For the 2021-2022 Session Collett sat on the following committees in the Senate:

- Aging and Youth - Minority Chair
- Community, Economic, and Recreational Development
- Judiciary
- Local Government
- Rules & Executive Nominations

For the 2025-2026 Session Collett sits on the following committees in the Senate:

- Aging & Youth (Minority Chair)
- Health & Human Services
- Institutional Sustainability & Innovation
- Judiciary
- Rules & Executive Nominations

=== Caucuses ===
Collett is a member of the following caucuses:

- Senate Arts & Culture
- Autism & Intellectual Disabilities
- Senate Brain Injury
- Climate
- Film Industry
- LGBT Equality
- PA Safe
- Rare Disease
- Senate Women's Health Caucuses.

=== Councils and task forces ===
Collett serves on the following councils, committees, and task forces:

- Asian American Coalition for Healthcare Services Advisory Board
- Joint Legislative Air and Water Pollution Control and Conservation Committee
- Legislative Audit Advisory Commission
- Montgomery County Aging and Adult Services Council
- Pennsylvania Advisory Council on Elder Justice in the Courts
- Pennsylvania Children's Health Advisory Council
- Pennsylvania Long-Term Care Council
- Special Education Funding Commission
- Suicide Prevention Task Force

=== Legislative priorities ===
As a state senator, Collett has focused on the issues of PFAS contamination throughout her district, nurse staffing ratios, the statute of limitations for sexual crimes, gender equity, and firearm regulation.

== Career ==
Collett began her career as an attorney representing the interests of children victimized by abuse and neglect as a deputy attorney general in Camden County, New Jersey. She then transitioned to a career in nursing, where she worked at the bedside as a Level I trauma nurse, in pediatric home health and in long-term care working with aging adults. Most recently, she worked as a nurse educator, helping other nurses understand how to administer Medicaid programs.

During the 2021-2022 Legislative Session, Collett was elected by her colleagues in the Senate Democratic Caucus to the position of caucus secretary.

== Education ==
Collett attended the University of Maryland, College Park where she earned a Bachelor of Arts in English literature, going on to earn a Juris Doctor from Rutgers Law School at Rutgers University, Camden, and then a Bachelor of Science in Nursing from Drexel University College of Nursing and Health Professions.
