= Miles Horst =

American politician (1891–1968)

Chairman of the Republican State Committee of Pennsylvania
- In office 1954–1956
- Preceded by: M. Harvey Taylor
- Succeeded by: George I. Bloom

Pennsylvania Secretary of Agriculture
- In office 1943–1954
- Governor: Edward Martin; John C. Bell Jr. James H. Duff
- Preceded by: John H. Light
- Succeeded by: W. S. Hagar

Personal details
- Born: May 25, 1891 Schaefferstown, Pennsylvania
- Died: April 5, 1968 (aged 76) Hagerstown, Maryland
- Party: Republican
- Education: Millersville State Normal School; Pennsylvania State College; Columbia University

Miles Horst (May 25, 1891 – April 5, 1968) was an American politician who was a member of the Pennsylvania House of Representatives (1933–1936), Pennsylvania Secretary of Agriculture (1943–1953), and chairman of the Republican State Committee of Pennsylvania (1954–1956).

== Early life ==
Horst was born in Schaefferstown, Pennsylvania on May 25, 1891. He graduated from Millersville State Normal School in 1909, Pennsylvania State College in 1914, and Columbia University in 1915. He was president of his class at Penn State. Prior to holding elected office, Horst was a farmer, field editor of the Pennsylvania Farmer, and secretary of the Pennsylvania Potato Growers' Association.

== Career ==
From 1933 to 1936, Horst was a member of the Pennsylvania House of Representatives. He was chairman of the legislative committee to investigate public relief during his second term. He did not run for reelection in 1936. After leaving office, Horst was secretary of the Pennsylvania State Grange and editor of the Pennsylvania Farmer. In 1943, he was appointed secretary of agriculture by Governor Edward Martin. He was retained by Governors John C. Bell Jr. and James H. Duff.

On June 19, 1954, Horst was unanimously elected chairman of the Republican state committee after receiving the support of Lieutenant Governor and 1954 gubernatorial nominee Lloyd H. Wood. Wood was upset by George M. Leader, becoming the first Republican to lose a Pennsylvania gubernatorial election since 1954. In 1956, Horst, a member of the James H. Duff-faction of the party, was opposed for reelection by George I. Bloom, a supporter of Joseph R. Grundy. Horst chose not to run for another term and instead endorsed Henry W. Lark. Lark withdrew shortly before the election and Bloom was elected unopposed.

On May 24, 1956, Horst was appointed staff assistant to United States Secretary of Agriculture Ezra Taft Benson. In 1962, Horst was chosen to coordinate the primary campaigns of the party-backed gubernatorial and United States Senate candidates William Scranton and James E. Van Zandt. It was believed that Horst would be able to counteract the rural support of Scranton's opponent, J. Collins McSparran, who was master of the Pennsylvania state grange. Scranton was able to defeat McSparran and win the general election. After taking office, he appointed Horst to the newly-created position of special advisor on agribusiness.

== Death ==
On April 5, 1968, Horst died suddenly while visiting relatives in Hagerstown, Maryland. He had been hospitalized three years prior and had not been in great health since.
