= Pennsylvania Republican Party =

Pennsylvania affiliate of the Republican Party

- Abbreviation: PAGOP
- Chairperson: Greg Rothman
- Senate President pro tempore: Kim Ward
- House Leader: Jesse Topper
- Founder: David Wilmot
- Founded: November 27, 1854; 171 years ago Towanda, Pennsylvania
- Headquarters: 112 State Street, Harrisburg, Pennsylvania 17101
- Membership (2026): ▼3,635,181
- Ideology: Conservatism
- National affiliation: Republican Party
- Colors: Red
- Seats in the U.S. Senate: 1 / 2
- Seats in the U.S. House: 10 / 17
- Statewide Executive Offices: 3 / 5
- Seats in the Pennsylvania Senate: 27 / 50
- Seats in the Pennsylvania House: 101 / 203
- Seats on the Pennsylvania Supreme Court: 2 / 7

Election symbol

Website
- pagop.org

The Pennsylvania Republican Party (PAGOP) is the affiliate of the Republican Party in the state of Pennsylvania, headquartered in Harrisburg. Its chairman is state senator Greg Rothman.

Along with the Pennsylvania Democratic Party, it is one of the two major political parties in the state. It currently controls one of Pennsylvania's U.S. Senate seats, 10 of the state's 17 U.S. House seats, three of the five statewide offices, and holds a majority in the Pennsylvania Senate.

== History ==
=== Founding ===
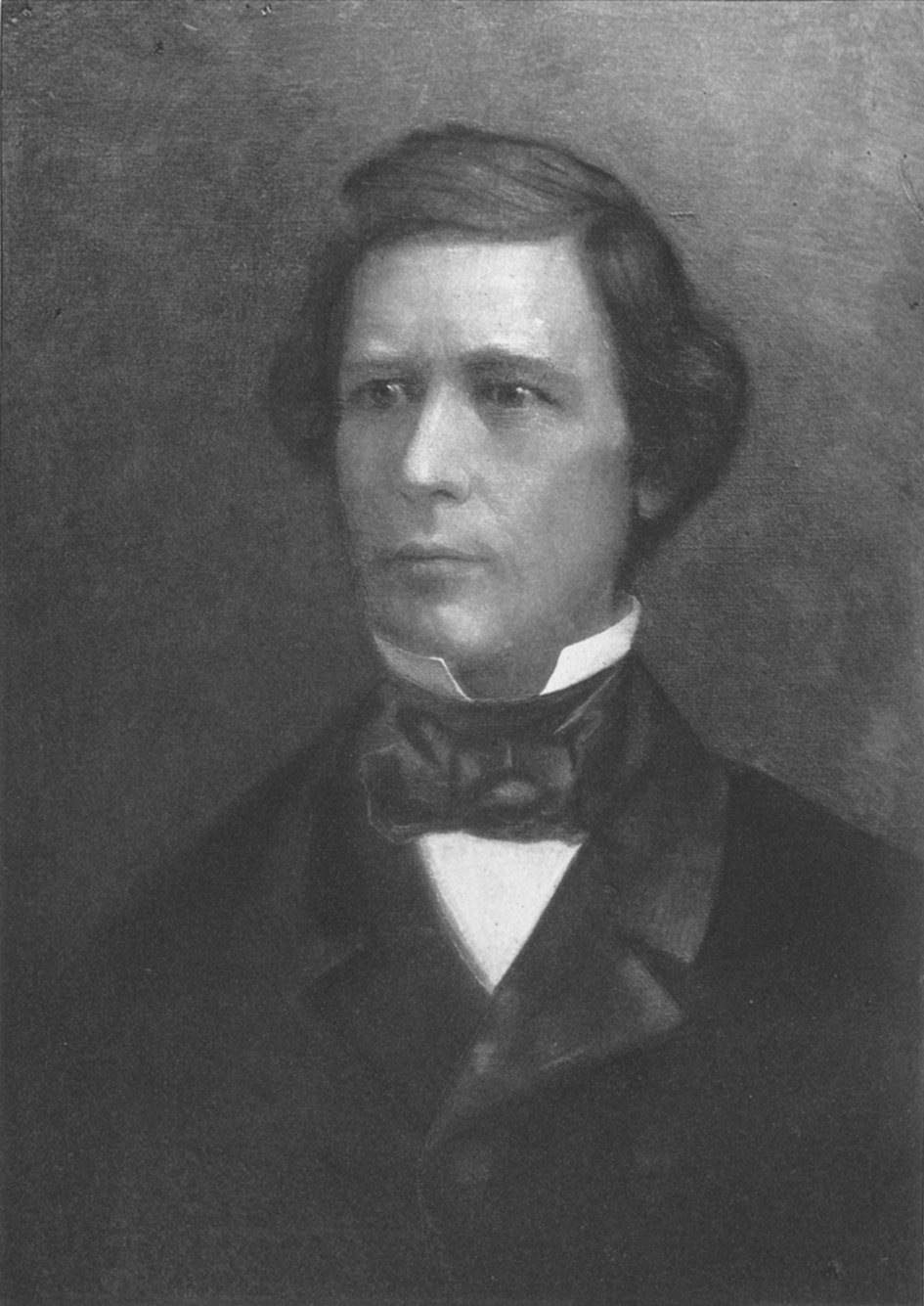
David Wilmot, party founder

The party was founded on November 27, 1854, in Towanda, Pennsylvania, by former Congressman David Wilmot. Wilmot invited political leaders and a small group of friends to the organization's first meeting, which took place in his home. Among the attendees were Senator Simon Cameron, Congressman Thaddeus Stevens, future governor Andrew Gregg Curtin, and Colonel Alexander McClure. Wilmot convinced the group to form local Republican clubs in their home counties.

Following the 1856 election, Pennsylvania Republicans reorganized as the People's Party. The change in name helped to welcome former Know Nothings who had supported Millard Fillmore over the Republican presidential candidate, John C. Frémont. The People's Party sent delegates to the 1860 Republican National Convention, where the Pennsylvanians voted for Cameron on the first ballot. During the American Civil War, leaders in the People's Party joined War Democrats to organize the Union Party. After 1868, the party was known as the National Union Republican, or Republican, party.

In 1959, party chairman George I. Bloom made the Republican Party a statewide organization. He had the headquarters located in Harrisburg, where it remains to this day.

=== Overview ===
Pennsylvania was dominated politically by the Democratic Party until around 1856. This is at least partially attributed to the desire of many in the state to promote its growing industries by raising taxes. From the period immediately preceding the Civil War until the mid-1930s, political dominance in the state largely rested with the Republican Party. The party was led by a series of bosses, including Simon Cameron, J. Donald Cameron, Matthew Quay, and Boies Penrose. Quay in particular was one of the dominant political figures of his era, as he served as chairman of the Republican National Committee and helped place Theodore Roosevelt on the 1900 Republican ticket. Republican dominance was ended by the growing influence of labor and urbanization, and the implementation of the New Deal. However, even after the New Deal, Republicans remained competitive in the state.

=== Governorship ===
During the period from the Civil War until the start of the Great Depression, Republican gubernatorial administrations outnumbered Democratic administrations by a margin of sixteen to two. The first Republican governor was elected in 1860, and there was a Republican governor until 1882. The governorship alternated between Republican and Democratic every term until 1894. From 1894 until 1934, Republicans held an unbroken grip on the governor's office. Democrat George Howard Earle III held the governorship for one term, from 1935 to 1939, after which Republicans held the governorship until the 1954 election of George M. Leader. Democrats continued to hold the governorship into 1963, following the 1958 election of Pittsburgh Mayor David L. Lawrence, who succeeded Leader. Republicans Bill Scranton and Ray Shafer followed Lawrence. In 1968, state law was changed to allow governors to run for a second consecutive four-year term. However, in the 1970 election, Democrat Milton Shapp defeated Shafer's lieutenant governor, Ray Broderick. Shapp was reelected over Republican nominee Drew Lewis in 1974.

=== Recent election history ===
==== Presidential ====
After Democrat Jimmy Carter's victory in 1976, Pennsylvania was carried by the Republican nominee in three consecutive elections: Ronald Reagan in 1980 and 1984, and George H. W. Bush in 1988.

From 1992 to 2012, the Democratic nominee carried Pennsylvania in every presidential election. In 2016, however, Republican Donald Trump defeated Democrat Hillary Clinton, becoming the first Republican to win the state in nearly three decades. In 2020, Democratic nominee Joe Biden defeated Trump in his reelection bid.

==== Congressional and state ====
Republicans held both of Pennsylvania's U.S. Senate seats from 1968 to 1991. In 1991, after the death of Senator John Heinz, a special election was held. In the election, former Kennedy administration official and Democrat Harris Wofford defeated Republican nominee Dick Thornburgh, who resigned as the United States attorney general to run in the election. The Republican defeat was considered to be a major upset. Wofford went on to be defeated in his bid for a full six-year term in 1994 by Republican Congressman Rick Santorum. Republicans would hold both of Pennsylvania's U.S. Senate seats until Santorum was defeated in his bid for a third term in 2006.

Following the 1994 federal and state elections, Republicans flipped the governorship with the election of Congressman Tom Ridge, retook the majorities in both houses of the General Assembly, and gained a majority of the state's congressional seats. Ridge won reelection to a second term in 1998, defeating his Democratic opponent by 26 percentage points. In 2001, Ridge resigned as governor to take the role of homeland security advisor to President George W. Bush. He was succeeded by Lieutenant Governor Mark Schweiker, who decided not to run for reelection. In 2002, Republicans lost the governorship to Democrat Ed Rendell.

Two statewide elections took place in 2006. In the U.S. Senate race, Democratic State Treasurer Bob Casey Jr. won, defeating incumbent Republican Rick Santorum. Santorum's margin of defeat was 18 percentage points—the largest for an incumbent Republican senator in state history. In the gubernatorial election, incumbent Democratic Governor Ed Rendell won a comfortable reelection over Republican challenger Lynn Swann. Democrats also retook the majority in the State House this year, though the balance of power in the State Senate remained the same.

In 2010, Republican nominee Pat Toomey defeated Democrat Joe Sestak in the U.S. Senate election. Sestak had defeated incumbent Senator Arlen Specter in the Democratic primary after Specter, who had been a Republican since his election to the Senate in 1980, switched his party affiliation to Democratic in 2009. Specter's partisan defection had briefly given Democrats control over both of Pennsylvania's U.S. Senate seats for the first time since before the Civil War. In the gubernatorial election, Republican Attorney General Tom Corbett defeated Democrat Dan Onorato. Republicans also retook the majority in the State House, which was captured by Democrats in 2006. Corbett ran for reelection to a second term in 2014, but was defeated by Democrat Tom Wolf. This marked the first time an incumbent governor running for reelection in Pennsylvania lost. Corbett is the last Republican to hold the office of governor.

In 2016, incumbent Republican Senator Pat Toomey won reelection to a second term, defeating Democratic challenger Katie McGinty. After Toomey announced in 2020 that he would retire and not seek a third term, Republicans lost the seat to Democrat John Fetterman, who defeated Republican nominee Mehmet Oz in the 2022 general election. Also in 2022, Democrats flipped the State House, while Republicans maintained the majority in the State Senate, which the party has held since 1994.

== Current elected officials ==
The Pennsylvania Republican Party controls three of the five statewide offices and holds a majority in the Pennsylvania Senate. Republicans hold one of the state's U.S. Senate seats, 10 of the state's 17 U.S. House seats, and a minority in the Pennsylvania House of Representatives.

=== Members of Congress ===
==== U.S. Senate ====
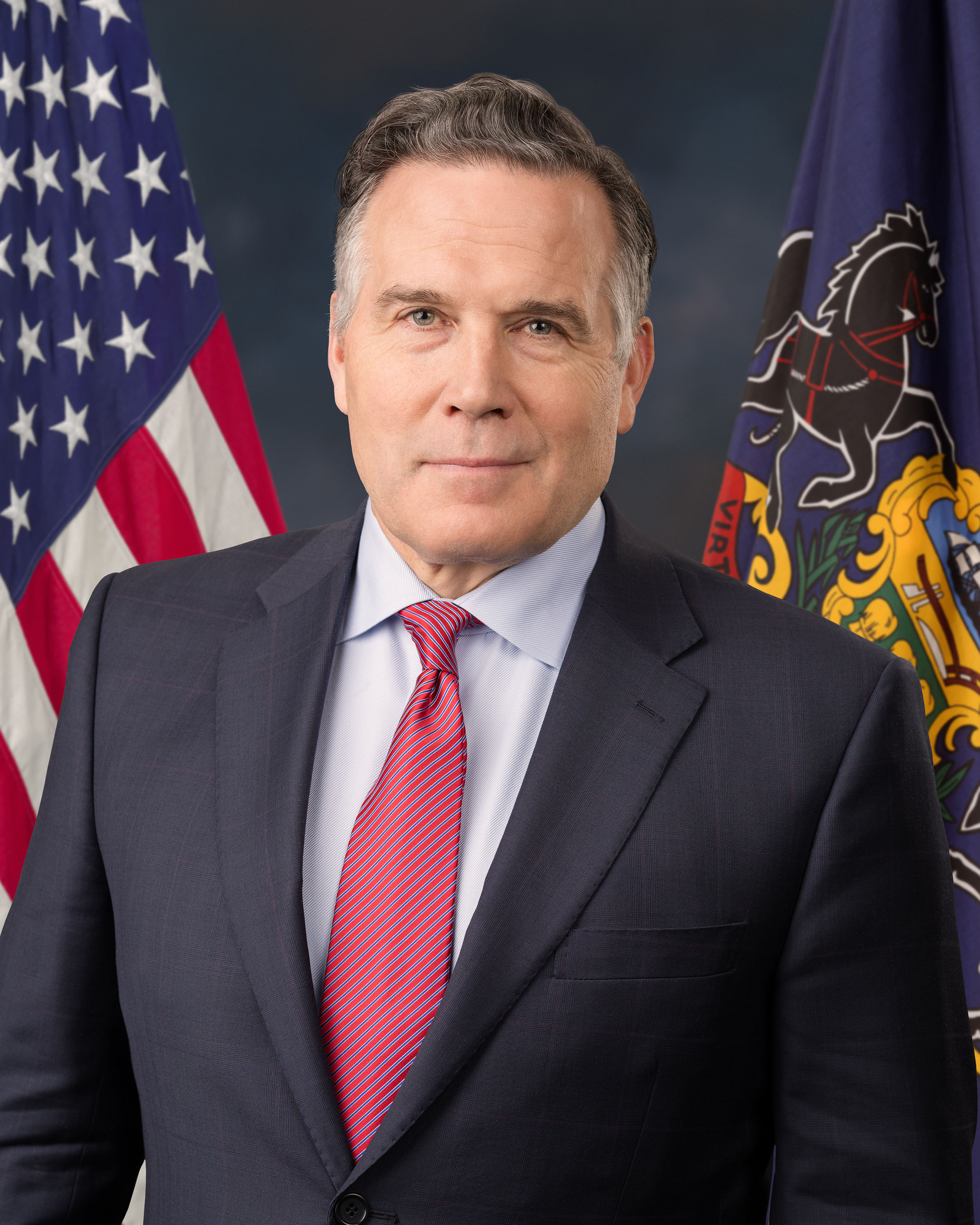
Junior U.S. Senator Dave McCormick

==== U.S. House of Representatives ====
District	Member	Photo
1st	Brian Fitzpatrick	
7th	Ryan Mackenzie	
8th	Rob Bresnahan	
9th	Dan Meuser	
10th	Scott Perry	
11th	Lloyd Smucker	
13th	John Joyce	
14th	Guy Reschenthaler	
15th	Glenn Thompson	
16th	Mike Kelly	

=== Statewide offices ===
- Attorney General: Dave Sunday
- Auditor General: Timothy DeFoor
- State Treasurer: Stacy Garrity

=== Legislative leadership ===
==== Pennsylvania Senate ====
- President pro tempore of the Senate: Kim Ward
- Senate Majority Leader: Joe Pittman

==== Pennsylvania House of Representatives ====
- House Minority Leader: Jesse Topper

== Leadership ==
- Chairman: Greg Rothman
- Vice Chair: Bernie Comfort
- Deputy Chair: Abby Kail
- Secretary: Ann Coleman
- Treasurer: Sam DeMarco
- National Committeeman: Andy Reilly
- National Committeewoman: Lori Hardiman

== Former chairmen ==
- Galusha A. Grow (1868–1869)
- Russell Errett (1874–1875)
- Henry M. Hoyt (1875–1876)
- J. Donald Cameron (1876–1877)
- W. P. Wilson (1877–1878)
- Matthew Quay (1878–1879, 1895–1896, 1902–1903)
- John Cessna (1880–1881)
- Thomas Valentine Cooper (1881–1888)
- William Henry Andrews (1888–1891)
- Louis Arthur Watres (1891–1892)
- Frank Reeder (1892–1893, 1899–1902)
- B. F. Gilkeson (1893–1895)
- John P. Elkin (1896–1899)
- Boies Penrose (1903–1905)
- Wesley R. Andrews (1905–1910)
- Henry F. Walton (1910–1912)
- Henry G. Wasson (1912–1913)
- William E. Crow (1913–1922)
- W. Harry Baker (1922–1926)
- William Larimer Mellon Sr. (1926–1928)
- Edward Martin (1928–1934)
- M. Harvey Taylor (1934–1937, 1942–1954)
- G. Edward Green (1937–1938)
- James F. Torrance (1938–1942)
- Miles Horst (1954–1956)
- George I. Bloom (1956–1963)
- Craig Truax (1963–1967)
- John C. Jordan (1967–1970)
- Clifford L. Jones (1970–1974)
- Richard Frame (1974–1977)
- Richard Filling (1977–1978)
- Bud Haabestad (1978–1980)
- Martha Bell Schoeninger (1980–1983)
- Bob Asher (1983–1986)
- Earl Baker (1986–1990)
- Anne Anstine (1990–1996)
- Alan Novak (1996–2004)
- Eileen Melvin (2004–2006)
- Rob Gleason (2006–2017)
- Val DiGiorgio (2017–2019)
- Lawrence Tabas (2019–2025)

== Election results ==
=== Presidential ===
Pennsylvania Republican Party presidential election results
Election	Presidential ticket	Votes	Vote %	Electoral votes	Result (Note: National result)
1856	John C. Frémont/William L. Dayton	147,286	32.01%	0 / 27	Lost
1860	Abraham Lincoln/Hannibal Hamlin	268,030	56.26%	27 / 27	Won
1864	Abraham Lincoln/Andrew Johnson	296,391	51.75%	26 / 26	Won
1868	Ulysses S. Grant/Schuyler Colfax	342,280	52.20%	26 / 26	Won
1872	Ulysses S. Grant/Henry Wilson	349,589	62.07%	29 / 29	Won
1876	Rutherford B. Hayes/William A. Wheeler	384,184	50.62%	29 / 29	Won
1880	James A. Garfield/Chester A. Arthur	444,704	50.84%	29 / 29	Won
1884	James G. Blaine/John A. Logan	478,804	52.97%	30 / 30	Lost
1888	Benjamin Harrison/Levi P. Morton	526,091	52.74%	30 / 30	Won
1892	Benjamin Harrison/Whitelaw Reid	516,011	51.45%	32 / 32	Lost
1896	William McKinley/Garret Hobart	728,300	60.98%	32 / 32	Won
1900	William McKinley/Theodore Roosevelt	712,665	60.74%	32 / 32	Won
1904	Theodore Roosevelt/Charles W. Fairbanks	840,949	68.00%	34 / 34	Won
1908	William Howard Taft/James S. Sherman	745,779	58.84%	34 / 34	Won
1912	William Howard Taft/Nicholas Murray Butler	273,360	22.45%	0 / 38	Lost
1916	Charles Evans Hughes/Charles W. Fairbanks	703,823	54.26%	38 / 38	Lost
1920	Warren G. Harding/Calvin Coolidge	1,218,216	65.76%	38 / 38	Won
1924	Calvin Coolidge/Charles G. Dawes	1,401,481	65.34%	38 / 38	Won
1928	Herbert Hoover/Charles Curtis	2,055,382	65.24%	38 / 38	Won
1932	Herbert Hoover/Charles Curtis	1,453,540	50.84%	36 / 36	Lost
1936	Alf Landon/Frank Knox	1,690,200	40.84%	0 / 36	Lost
1940	Wendell Willkie/Charles L. McNary	1,889,848	46.33%	0 / 36	Lost
1944	Thomas E. Dewey/John W. Bricker	1,835,054	48.36%	0 / 35	Lost
1948	Thomas E. Dewey/Earl Warren	1,902,197	50.93%	35 / 35	Lost
1952	Dwight D. Eisenhower/Richard Nixon	2,415,789	52.74%	32 / 32	Won
1956	Dwight D. Eisenhower/Richard Nixon	2,585,252	56.49%	32 / 32	Won
1960	Richard Nixon/Henry Cabot Lodge Jr.	2,439,956	48.74%	0 / 32	Lost
1964	Barry Goldwater/William E. Miller	1,673,657	34.70%	0 / 29	Lost
1968	Richard Nixon/Spiro Agnew	2,090,017	44.02%	0 / 29	Won
1972	Richard Nixon/Spiro Agnew	2,714,521	59.11%	27 / 27	Won
1976	Gerald Ford/Bob Dole	2,205,604	47.73%	0 / 27	Lost
1980	Ronald Reagan/George H. W. Bush	2,261,872	49.59%	27 / 27	Won
1984	Ronald Reagan/George H. W. Bush	2,584,323	53.34%	25 / 25	Won
1988	George H. W. Bush/Dan Quayle	2,300,087	50.70%	25 / 25	Won
1992	George H. W. Bush/Dan Quayle	1,791,841	36.12%	0 / 23	Lost
1996	Bob Dole/Jack Kemp	1,801,169	39.97%	0 / 23	Lost
2000	George W. Bush/Dick Cheney	2,281,127	46.43%	0 / 23	Won
2004	George W. Bush/Dick Cheney	2,793,847	48.42%	0 / 21	Won
2008	John McCain/Sarah Palin	2,655,885	44.15%	0 / 21	Lost
2012	Mitt Romney/Paul Ryan	2,680,434	46.59%	0 / 20	Lost
2016	Donald Trump/Mike Pence	2,970,733	48.18%	20 / 20	Won
2020	Donald Trump/Mike Pence	3,377,674	48.84%	0 / 20	Lost
2024	Donald Trump/JD Vance	3,543,308	50.37%	19 / 19	Won

=== Gubernatorial ===
Pennsylvania Republican Party gubernatorial election results
Election	Gubernatorial candidate/ticket	Votes	Vote %	Result
1857	David Wilmot	146,139	40.24%	Lost ✗
1860	Andrew Gregg Curtin	262,346	53.26%	Won ✓
1863	Andrew Gregg Curtin	269,506	51.46%	Won ✓
1866	John W. Geary	307,274	51.44%	Won ✓
1869	John W. Geary	290,552	50.40%	Won ✓
1872	John F. Hartranft	353,287	52.55%	Won ✓
1875	John F. Hartranft	304,175	49.90%	Won ✓
1878	Henry M. Hoyt	319,567	45.52%	Won ✓
1882	James A. Beaver	315,589	42.43%	Lost ✗
1886	James A. Beaver	412,285	50.33%	Won ✓
1890	George W. Delamater	447,655	48.23%	Lost ✗
1894	Daniel H. Hastings	574,801	60.31%	Won ✓
1898	William A. Stone	476,206	49.01%	Won ✓
1902	Samuel W. Pennypacker	593,328	54.20%	Won ✓
1906	Edwin Sydney Stuart	506,418	50.31%	Won ✓
1910	John K. Tener	412,658	41.33%	Won ✓
1914	Martin Grove Brumbaugh	588,705	52.98%	Won ✓
1918	William Cameron Sproul	552,537	61.05%	Won ✓
1922	Gifford Pinchot	831,696	56.79%	Won ✓
1926	John Stuchell Fisher	1,102,823	73.35%	Won ✓
1930	Gifford Pinchot	1,068,874	50.77%	Won ✓
1934	William A. Schnader	1,410,138	47.80%	Lost ✗
1938	Arthur James	2,035,340	53.39%	Won ✓
1942	Edward Martin	1,367,531	53.67%	Won ✓
1946	James H. Duff/Daniel Strickler	1,828,462	58.52%	Won ✓
1950	John S. Fine/Lloyd Wood	1,796,119	50.74%	Won ✓
1954	Lloyd Wood/Frank Truscott	1,717,070	46.15%	Lost ✗
1958	Art McGonigle/John M. Walker	1,948,769	48.93%	Lost ✗
1962	William Scranton/Ray Shafer	2,424,918	55.39%	Won ✓
1966	Ray Shafer/Ray Broderick	2,110,349	52.10%	Won ✓
1970	Ray Broderick/Ralph Scalera	1,542,854	41.76%	Lost ✗
1974	Drew Lewis/Kenneth Lee	1,578,917	45.11%	Lost ✗
1978	Dick Thornburgh/William Scranton III	1,996,042	52.54%	Won ✓
1982	Dick Thornburgh/William Scranton III	1,872,784	50.84%	Won ✓
1986	William Scranton III/Mike Fisher	1,638,268	48.35%	Lost ✗
1990	Barbara Hafer/Harold Mowery	987,516	32.34%	Lost ✗
1994	Tom Ridge/Mark Schweiker	1,627,976	45.40%	Won ✓
1998	Tom Ridge/Mark Schweiker	1,736,844	57.42%	Won ✓
2002	Mike Fisher/Jane Earll	1,589,408	44.40%	Lost ✗
2006	Lynn Swann/Jim Matthews	1,622,135	39.61%	Lost ✗
2010	Tom Corbett/Jim Cawley	2,172,763	54.49%	Won ✓
2014	Tom Corbett/Jim Cawley	1,575,511	45.07%	Lost ✗
2018	Scott Wagner/Jeff Bartos	2,039,899	40.70%	Lost ✗
2022	Doug Mastriano/Carrie DelRosso	2,238,477	41.71%	Lost ✗
2026	Stacy Garrity/Jason Richey	1,913,358	38.17%	Lost ✗

== See also ==
- Political party strength in Pennsylvania
- Pennsylvania Democratic Party
- Libertarian Party of Pennsylvania
- Green Party of Pennsylvania
