= George I. Bloom =

American politician (1898–1991)

Secretary of the Commonwealth of Pennsylvania
- In office 1963–1965
- Governor: William Scranton
- Preceded by: E. James Trimarchi
- Succeeded by: W. Stuart Helm

Chairman of the Republican State Committee of Pennsylvania
- In office 1956–1963
- Preceded by: Miles Horst
- Succeeded by: Craig Truax

Personal details
- Born: September 2, 1898 Burgettstown, Pennsylvania
- Died: February 3, 1991 (aged 92) Camp Hill, Pennsylvania
- Party: Republican
- Education: University of Pittsburgh; University of Pittsburgh School of Law

George Isaac Bloom (September 2, 1898 – February 3, 1991) was an American political figure who served as chairman of the Republican State Committee of Pennsylvania (1956–1963), Secretary of the Commonwealth of Pennsylvania (1963–1965), and chairman of the Pennsylvania Public Utility Commission (1965–1975).

== Biography ==
Bloom was born in Burgettstown, Pennsylvania and graduated from the University of Pittsburgh in 1920 and the University of Pittsburgh School of Law in 1922. He began his political involvement at the age of 13 by canvassing for a candidate for district attorney. In 1939, he was elected to the Republican state committee. He was secretary to Governor Edward Martin from 1943 to 1947 and was his administrative assistant in Washington, D.C. after he was elected to the United States Senate.

The Republicans lost the 1954 Pennsylvania gubernatorial election, their first gubernatorial defeat in 20 years. In 1956, George I. Bloom, a member of the Joseph R. Grundy/Edward Martin–faction of the party, opposed incumbent state party chair Miles Horst, a member of the James H. Duff–faction, for reelection. Horst chose not to run for another term and instead endorsed Henry W. Lark. Lark withdrew shortly before the election and Bloom was elected unopposed. In 1959, Bloom made the Republican Party a statewide organization. He had the headquarters located in Harrisburg, Pennsylvania, where it remains to this day. In 1960, called for an investigation into allegations of electoral fraud involving Democrats in Philadelphia. The investigation resulted in the indictment, resignation, or termination of a number of state officials. Bloom convinced William Scranton to be the party's candidate in the 1962 Pennsylvania gubernatorial election, which Scranton won.

Bloom resigned as party chairman to serve as Scranton's Secretary of the Commonwealth and was succeeded by Craig Truax. From 1965 to 1975, Bloom was chairman of the Pennsylvania Public Utility Commission. He remained a member of the Republican state committee until his death on February 3, 1991, at Holy Spirit Hospital.
