= Vroon =

Vroon is a surname. Notable people with the surname include:

- Donald Vroon (born 1942), American musicologist
- Peter Vroon (1917–1997), American politician
