= James Millikin =

American educator (1827–1909)

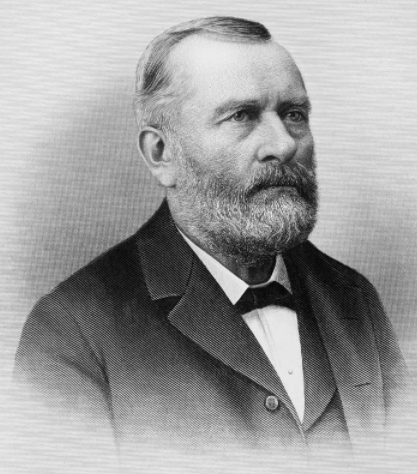
- Born: August 2, 1827; Clarkstown, Pennsylvania, U.S.
- Died: March 2, 1909 (aged 81); Orlando, Florida, U.S.
- Education: Washington College
- Occupation: Educator
- Known for: Founder of Millikin University
- Spouse: Anna Bernice Aston (m. 1857)

James Millikin (August 2, 1827 – March 2, 1909) was the founder of Millikin University in Decatur, Illinois, United States.

== Early life ==
James Millikin was born on August 2, 1827, in Clarkstown, now Ten Mile, western Pennsylvania, to Abel Millikin and Nancy (Van Dyke) Millikin. (Note: Some sources give his birthdate as August 2, 1830.) Abel was a moderately successful farmer.

Little is known about his childhood in Western Pennsylvania prior to his enrollment as a student at Washington College (now Washington & Jefferson College). While attending college and seeing his classmates struggle with college expenses, James made a vow that if he made a fortune he would found an institution of learning where all who sought an education could receive one that fit any occupation they may desire.

While medicine had become the desired career of some of his relatives, James was more persuaded towards business as his profession. Partnering first with his own father, James and Abel spent the summer of 1849 driving sheep to Indiana to sell at market. The following year, James drove another flock to Danville, Illinois, pasturing them briefly and selling the herd at a larger profit.

His educational interests continued briefly during the winter of 1850 in Wabash College at Crawfordsville, IN, before he resumed his sheep herding enterprises. It was during the 1850s that James began purchasing government land tracts throughout Illinois and Iowa for investment. Expanding his herds to include livestock, he later came to be called "first cattle king of the Prairie State."

For a time, he settled near the town of Danville, IL, for his enterprises.

== Marriage ==
It is unclear when James Millikin formally met Anna Bernice Aston, the daughter of Rev. Samuel Aston and Hetty (Bartlett) Aston. Rev. Samuel Aston was a minister of the Cumberland Presbyterian Church, and served churches near James Millikin's childhood home. Anna Bernice Aston attended Washington Female Seminary in Washington, Pennsylvania around the same time that James Millikin's own sisters were students. A legend, according to Dr. Albert Reynolds Taylor, first president of Millikin University, was James' sisters wrote to him encouraging the relationship.

Rev. Samuel Aston later located to Mt. Zion, Illinois, but died on November 7, 1856. James and Anna were married on January 1, 1857, at the Aston home in Mt. Zion by Rev. E. W. Thayer of the First Presbyterian Church in Decatur, Illinois.

== Settling in Decatur ==
Around the time of his marriage, James had been visiting Decatur and believed he saw a good future with it. It is estimated that when James and Anna arrived in Decatur, James had a personal fortune of $75,000, acquired in large part from selling his government land purchases for good profit as development grew.

Around 1860, a local bank called the Railroad Bank failed in Decatur. Several of Decatur's citizens urged James to reopen the shuttered bank. Encouraged by their support, he reopened the location with the sign "J. Millikin, banker."

== Millikin National Bank ==
The first twenty years as a private banker, James later confessed to his friends, were the most difficult. While recognized quickly as a safe and stable institution, the Millikin bank made little money and keeping his own $75,000 fortune intact during those years was a priority. He was able to choose a staff of associates, including Jerome R. Gorin, Orville B. Gorin, Parke Hammer, Joseph M. Brownback, Smith Walker, William Hammer, and Guy P. Lewis.

By 1897, the Millikin bank was incorporated and obtained a charter as a national bank. By 1907, it was considered one of the strongest small city banks in the United States.

== The Homestead ==
Following their marriage, James and Anna Millikin briefly lived at the Revere House, a prominent Decatur hotel until purchasing a small home at the corner of Edward and William Street they affectionately recalled as "the cottage." In 1862, James purchased 22 acres of land for the unheard of sum of $2200 near the western edge of Decatur. Between 1862–1875 he sold portions of the purchase for more than his original sale, eventually having only 6 acres.

Construction began in July 1875 and concluded in 1876. The home's exterior reflects the Italianate style with mansard roofs more reflected in Second Empire. It is said the first floor is similar to James' childhood home in Pennsylvania. The home was completed at a cost of $18,000.

In 1883, some major remodeling was completed. A new kitchen was added to the northwest corner of the house so a new grand staircase could be placed adjacent to the north parlor room. Indoor plumbing was also added to the home, likely one of the first homes in Decatur to have such luxuries.

In later years, James and Anna Millikin travelled frequently to Europe and purchased artwork for the home. Several of their personal purchases remain at the homestead today.

Millikin died in Orlando, Florida, on March 2, 1909, aged 81, and is buried in Greenwood Cemetery in Decatur.
