= Lillian R. Narins =

Philadelphia peace activist and Progressive Party political candidate

Lillian Narins in 1949

Lillian Ritz Narins (October 14, 1907 - February 12, 1993) was a Philadelphia peace activist and Progressive Party political candidate.

Narins was born Lillian Rabinowitz in Philadelphia in 1907. Her parents, David Rabinowitz and Anna Merraine Rabinowitz, were Russian Jewish immigrants who arrived in the city in 1900. She taught in Philadelphia's public schools and married Arthur Narins in 1930. Arthur served in World War II, and Lillian later became the chairwoman of the Jewish War Veterans' Ladies Auxiliary. During the war, Narins served on the Citizens Committee for the Care of Children in Wartime. She left the teaching profession around that time and became involved in local politics.

Narins joined the Progressive Party that was founded in 1948 to support Henry A. Wallace's third-party bid for the White House. In 1949, she collected signatures on a peace petition encouraging the United States to stay out of the conflict that would become the Korean War the following year. Her position was unpopular, leading to her ouster from the Jewish War Veterans position and her husband's resignation from the organization. That same year, Narins ran for a seat on the Philadelphia City Council in a special election that followed the death of Republican L. Wallace Egan. She made an issue of a recent transit fare hike, saying that the situation "did not warrant an increase in fares." She tallied 1,290 votes, but lost handily to Democrat Harry Norwitch. Narins ran for the United States Senate in 1950, again as a Progressive. Her platform was against conscription, poll taxes, lynchings, and the registration of communists. If elected, she pledged to work for a higher minimum wage and a nationalized healthcare system. She received 5,516 votes, falling well short of the winner, Republican James H. Duff.

From 1952 to 1954, Narins was repeatedly investigated by the FBI as a suspected communist. After the demise of the Progressive Party, she remained out of public life. Arthur Narins died in 1988 and Lillian passed in 1993. She was buried at Mount Lebanon Cemetery in Collingdale, Pennsylvania, survived by two nieces.
