= Finnegan Foundation =

American non-profit educational organization

- Formation: 1960
- Type: 501(c)(3) nonprofit organization

The James A. Finnegan Foundation was founded in 1960 and incorporated under Pennsylvania law as a 501(c)(3) non-profit educational organization. It is governed by an independent Board of Directors, many of whom are Finnegan Alumni.

== Founding ==
It was established to honor the memory of James A. Finnegan, Pennsylvania Secretary of the Commonwealth (1955–58), who died in office. Founders of the foundation included: Pittsburgh Mayor Joe Barr, Commonwealth Judge Genevieve Blatt, Democratic National Committeewoman Louise M. John, Pennsylvania Gov. David Lawrence, U.S. Ambassador Matthew H. McCloskey II, U.S. Ambassador John Rice, and Pennsylvania State Treasurer Grace M. Sloan.

== Purpose ==
The foundation works to provide practical training in government and politics for outstanding undergraduate students by offering a number of ten-week paid internships in executive agencies located in Harrisburg, Pennsylvania each summer.

In addition, Finnegan Fellows meet weekly with sitting state officials for lunch. Past luncheon guests have included the state police commissioner, secretary of public welfare, the state treasurer, and representatives of the Independent Regulatory Review Commission.

== Competition ==
The foundation chooses 3-6 applicants annually. Finnegan Fellows are successful undergraduate students at Pennsylvania universities or Pennsylvanians attending out-of-state universities. Students must show exceptional skill academically, strong community involvement, and write a successful policy proposal on a selected topic as determined by a panel of judges. Winners receive a cash award and are invited to a spring luncheon at the Pennsylvania Governor's Residence in Harrisburg. Candidates from Elizabethtown College have been especially successful.

== Prominent alumni ==
- Hon. Dr. David Argall F'79 - Pennsylvania House of Representatives Whip (2005-2008), Chair of Appropriations Committee (2001-2004); Pennsylvania State Senate (2009-Present)
- Eric Fillman, Esq. F'83 - Chief Integrity Officer, Office of the Pennsylvania Attorney General (2017-Present)
- Hon. Jaret Gibbons F'01 - Pennsylvania House of Representatives (2007-Present)
- Ken Lawrence F'95 - President, Public Affairs Strategies
- Hon. Stephen R. Reed F'70 - Mayor, City of Harrisburg, Pennsylvania (1982-2010)
- Melanie Burke Reiser F'97 - Executive Director, Charter School Resource Center
- Kathy Speaker MacNett F'68 - Intergovernmental Cooperation Authority of Harrisburg (2019-Present)
