= Daniel Strickler =

American politician (1897–1992)

Daniel B. Strickler
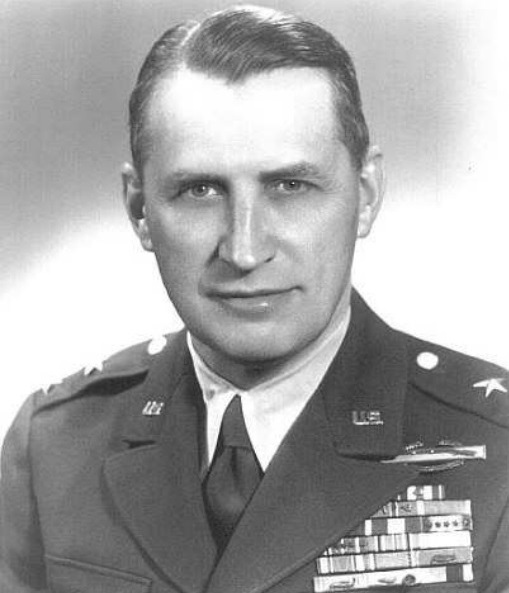
- Strickler as commander of the 28th Infantry Division, circa 1951.

19th Lieutenant Governor of Pennsylvania
- In office January 21, 1947 – January 16, 1951
- Governor: James Duff
- Preceded by: John Bell
- Succeeded by: Lloyd Wood

Member of the Pennsylvania House of Representatives
- In office 1931–1933

Personal details
- Born: May 17, 1897 Lancaster, Pennsylvania, U.S.
- Died: June 29, 1992 (aged 95) Lancaster, Pennsylvania, U.S.
- Party: Republican
- Education: Cornell University
- Profession: Attorney

Military service
- Allegiance: United States of America
- Branch/service: United States Army
- Years of service: 1916-1957
- Rank: Major General
- Commands: 313th Infantry Regiment; 158th Infantry Brigade; 1st Battalion, 112th Infantry Regiment; 1st Battalion, 109th Infantry Regiment; 109th Infantry Regiment; 28th Infantry Division; Military Assistance Advisory Group, Rome, Italy
- Battles/wars: Pancho Villa Expedition; World War I World War II; Korean War
- Awards: Silver Star (2); Legion of Merit (2); Purple Heart

Daniel Bursk Strickler (May 17, 1897 – June 29, 1992) was the 19th lieutenant governor of Pennsylvania from 1947 to 1950, under Governor James Duff. He was also a career officer in the United States Army, with service on active duty, in the Army Reserve, and in the Pennsylvania Army National Guard, and he served as commander of the 28th Infantry Division.

== Early life ==
Strickler was born in Lancaster, Pennsylvania on May 17, 1897. He attended the public schools of Columbia, Pennsylvania, and graduated from Columbia High School in 1916. He was president of his class in his junior and senior years, captained the track team, and played baseball and basketball.

== Start of military career ==
He enlisted as a private in the 4th Pennsylvania Infantry Regiment in January 1916. He was soon promoted to corporal and sergeant, and in April 1917 received his commission as a second lieutenant. In July 1917 his unit was mobilized for participation in the Mexican Border Conflict.

In September 1917 Strickler was promoted to first lieutenant. After reorganization for World War I, Strickler's company became Company B of the 109th Machine Gun Battalion, a unit of the 28th Infantry Division. Strickler served in five campaigns, was wounded, and received the Purple Heart.

== Post-World War I ==
After the war Strickler enrolled in Cornell Law School. He served as president of the Quill and Dagger society in his senior year, was captain of the track team, and was a member of the Senior Honor Society. Strickler was also president of the senior class, and a member of the Alpha Kappa chapter of Kappa Sigma fraternity. He received his LL.B. degree in 1922, and returned to Lancaster to practice law.

Active in politics as a Republican, in 1930 Strickler won a seat in the Pennsylvania House of Representatives, and he served one term, 1931 to 1933. He was an unsuccessful candidate for reelection in 1932. That same year he was appointed Lancaster's police commissioner; he served until 1933, and worked aggressively to combat bootleggers until the end of Prohibition. From 1933 to 1942 he was Lancaster's city solicitor.

== World War II ==
Strickler had continued his military service as a member of the Organized Reserve after the first World War, receiving promotion to captain in 1918, major in 1922, lieutenant colonel in 1928, and colonel in 1935. He graduated from the United States Army Command and General Staff College, and from 1935 to 1938 he commanded the 313th Infantry Regiment, a unit of the 79th Infantry Division. From 1938 to 1942 he commanded the division's 158th Infantry Brigade.

Strickler accepted a reduction in rank to lieutenant colonel in order to command 1st Battalion, 112th Infantry Regiment, a unit of the 28th Infantry Division. He later served as commander of 1st Battalion, 109th Infantry. In September 1944 he became commander of the 109th Infantry, which he led until December, when he was named to command of the 110th Infantry Regiment, which he led until the end of the war, again receiving promotion to colonel. He commanded troops during the Battle of the Hurtgen Forest and the Battle of the Bulge, and received the Silver Star for heroism during the Battle of the Bulge.

== Post-World War II ==
In 1946 Strickler was promoted to brigadier general as deputy commander of the 28th Infantry Division. The same year he was elected lieutenant governor of Pennsylvania. He served from 1947 until 1951.

== Return to active duty ==
In the waning days of his term, Strickler resigned as Lieutenant Governor to become commander of the 28th Infantry Division as a major general when it was activated for service in West Germany during the Korean War. He served with the division until 1952, and remained on active duty after the division was demobilized.

Continuing his military service after the war, Strickler served as chief of the Military Assistance Advisory Group in Rome, Italy (1952–1953), a member of the Secretary of the Army's Review Board Council from 1953 to 1956, and assistant chief of staff for civil affairs (J-5) with the Far East Command in Tokyo (1956 to 1957).

After retiring from the military in 1957 he returned to Lancaster and resumed the practice of law.

== Death and burial ==
Strickler died in Lancaster on June 29, 1992. He was buried at Woodward Hill Cemetery in Lancaster.

== Awards and honors ==
In 1960 Strickler received a state promotion to lieutenant general in recognition of his many years of superior service.

Strickler Field, a parade ground and physical training site at Fort Indiantown Gap is named in his honor.

In 2013 Strickler was named to the Pennsylvania Department of Military and Veterans Affairs Hall of Fame.

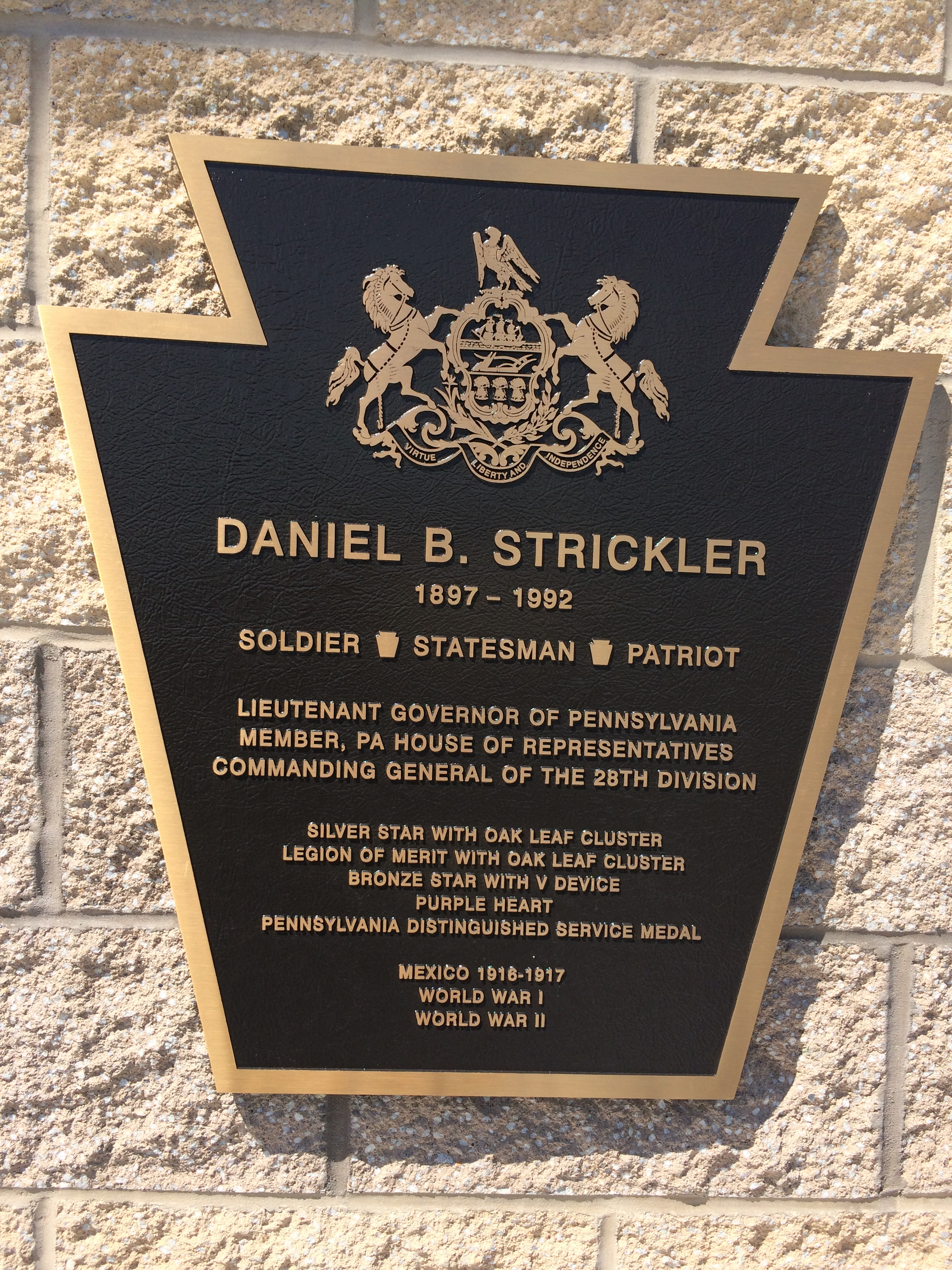
Strickler Field grandstand plaque.

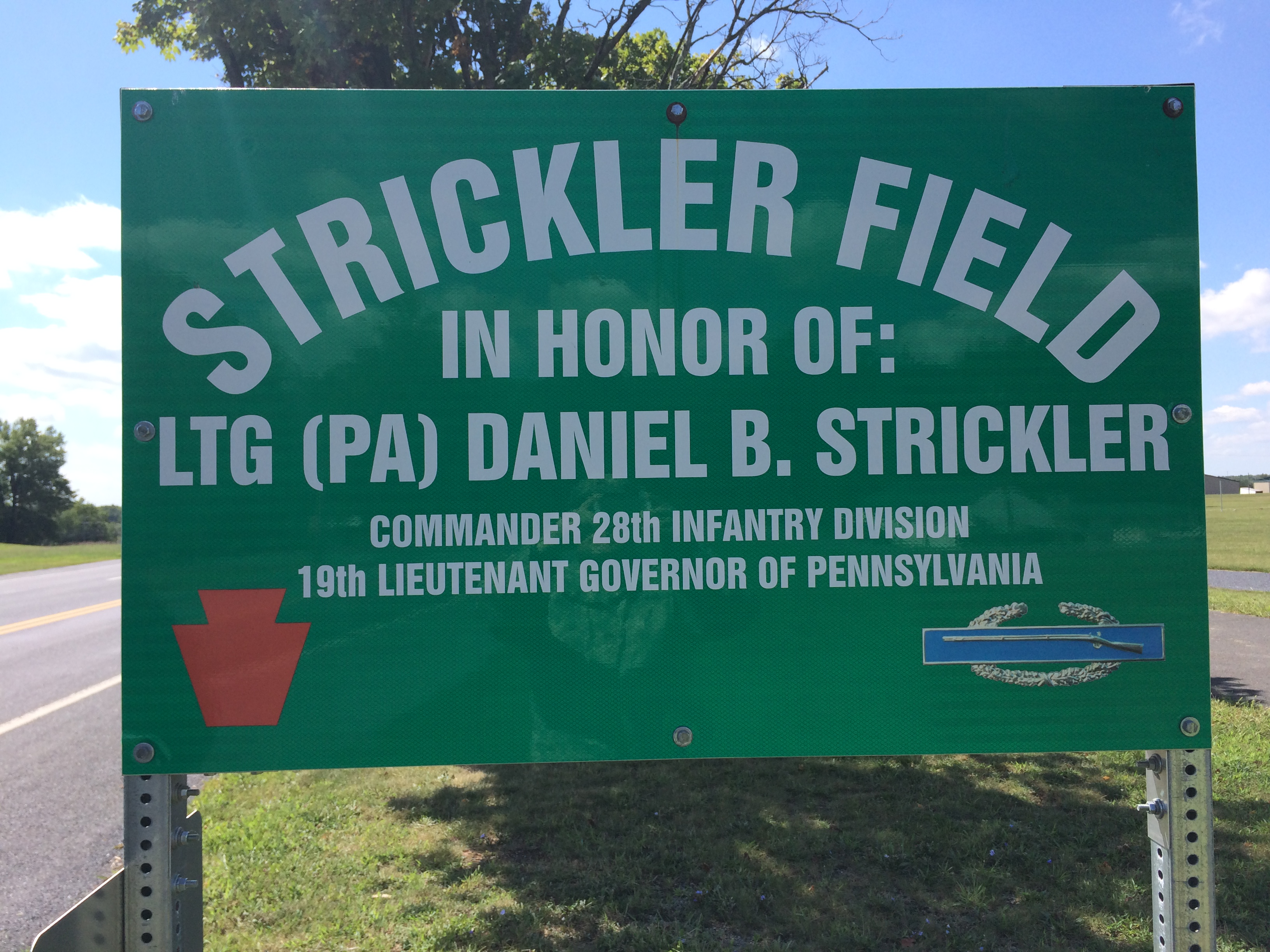
Strickler Field sign.

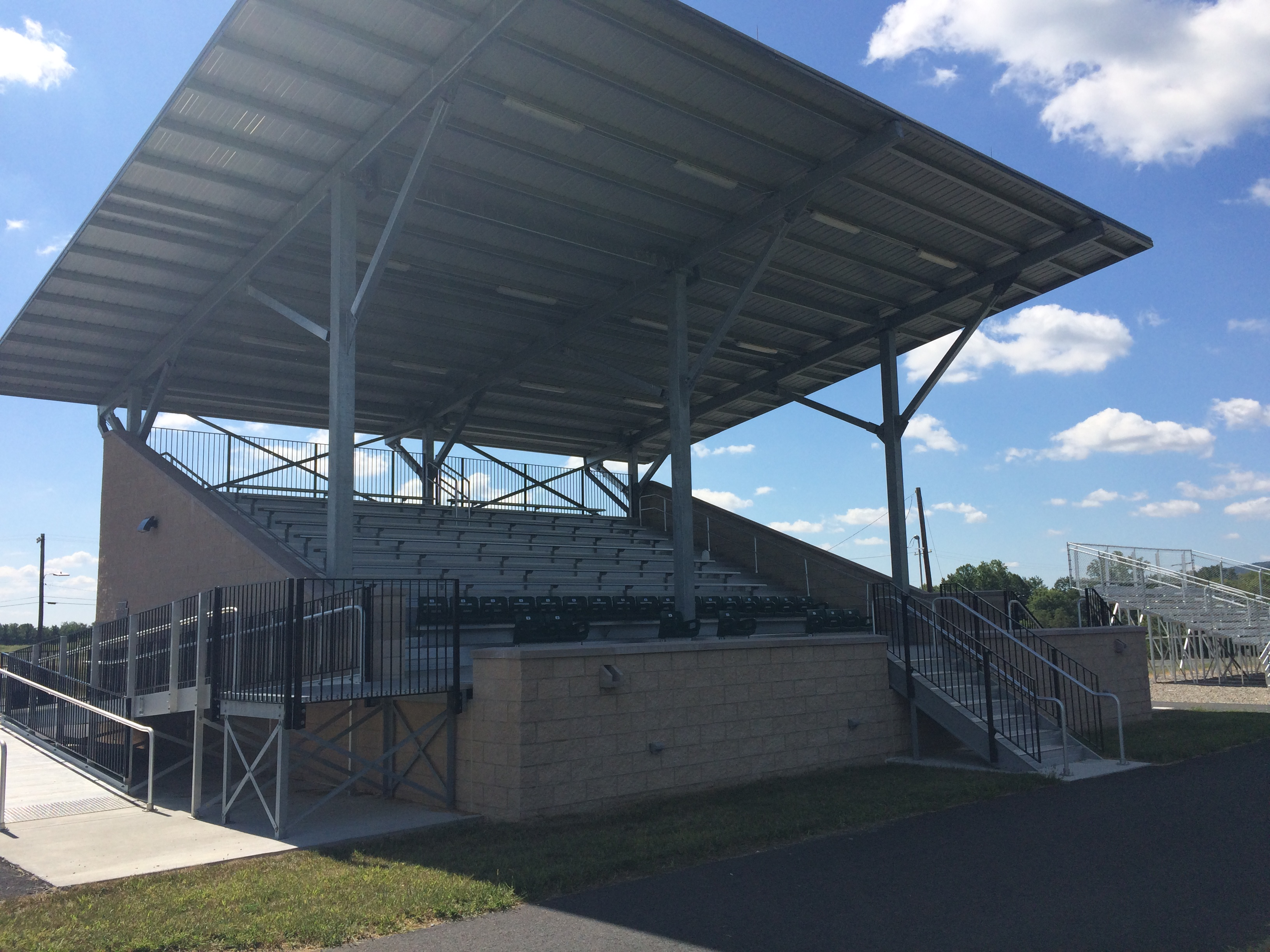
Strickler Field grandstand.

== Military awards ==
Strickler's decorations included: Silver Star (2); Legion of Merit (2); Purple Heart; Bronze Star Medal with "V" Device for valor; Order of Leopold with Palm (Belgium); Croix de Guerre with Palm (Belgium); Croix de Guerre with Palm (France); Order of the Rising Sun (Japan); Combat Infantryman Badge; and Pennsylvania Distinguished Service Medal.

Political offices
Preceded by John Bell^{1}	Lieutenant Governor of Pennsylvania; 1947–1951	Succeeded by Lloyd Wood
Party political offices
Preceded by John Bell	Republican nominee for Lieutenant Governor of Pennsylvania; 1946	Succeeded by Lloyd Wood
Notes and references
1. Preceded as Acting Lieutenant Governor by Harvey Taylor and Weldon Heyburn
