= Robert Gleason (politician) =

American politician

Rob Gleason
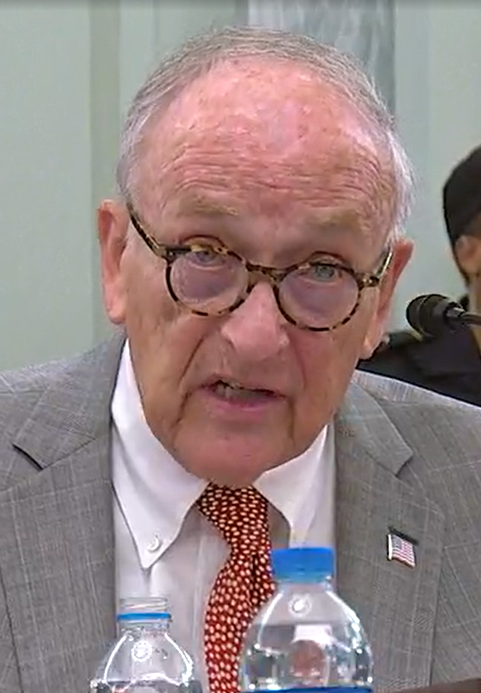
- Gleason in 2025

Chair of the Pennsylvania Republican Party
- In office June 3, 2006 – February 15, 2017
- Preceded by: Eileen Melvin
- Succeeded by: Val DiGiorgio

Secretary of the Commonwealth of Pennsylvania
- In office July 1, 1985 – January 20, 1987
- Governor: Dick Thornburgh
- Preceded by: William Davis
- Succeeded by: James Haggerty

Personal details
- Party: Republican
- Spouse: Jeanne
- Children: 4
- Education: University of Pennsylvania (BA)

Robert A. "Rob" Gleason Jr. is an American businessman who formerly served as Chair of the Pennsylvania Republican Party.

== Early life, professional career and memberships ==
A 1956 graduate of Westmont Hilltop High School and a 1957 graduate of The Kiski School, Gleason graduated in 1961 from the University of Pennsylvania's Wharton School.

An insurance broker, Gleason served as chair and CEO of The Gleason Agency, an insurance brokerage firm started by his grandfather and continued by his father, Robert A. Gleason. Gleason sold the business to Arthur J. Gallagher & Co. in 2010.

Gleason served as a trustee of Saint Francis University from 1978 to 1988 and the University of Pennsylvania from 1998 to 2013. Gleason is also a Kiski School trustee. Gleason was elected as a Westmont Hilltop Education Board member in 2019 and board president in 2020.

Gleason also affiliates with various civic, philanthropic, and professional organizations serving as Chair of the Council of Insurance Agents and Brokers in 2000. Gleason was the Conemaugh Memorial Medical Center Trustee Board Chair and served as an Altoona-Johnstown Roman Catholic Diocese Foundation trustee and Secretary.

== Political career ==
=== Appointed positions ===
Gleason served in Governor Dick Thornburgh's cabinet as Secretary of the Commonwealth from 1985 to 1987. In 1993, Governor Bob Casey nominated Gleason to be a member of the five-person Pennsylvania Turnpike Commission, where he served until 1997. In 1997, Governor Tom Ridge appointed Gleason to the State Transportation Commission. President George Bush appointed Gleason to the Commission of Presidential Scholars from 2006 to 2010. President Donald Trump appointed Gleason to the United States Air Force Academy Board of Visitors from 2018 to 2021.

In March 2025, President Trump nominated Gleason for a seat on the Amtrak board of directors.

=== Republican Party politics ===
==== Cambria County ====
In 1996, Gleason succeeded his father, the late Robert A. Gleason Sr., as the Cambria County Republican Party Chair.

==== Pennsylvania ====
In 2002, PoliticsPA named Gleason to its list of Pennsylvania's Best County Party Chairs, saying that Gleason "brings in money and gets things done" in a "tough county for any Republican."

In 2004, Gleason was Pennsylvania's Catholics for Bush co-chair. Gleason became the Pennsylvania Republican Party Chair in June 2006, following the retirement of Eileen Melvin, serving until 2017.

In 2009, Politics Magazine ranked Gleason and his brother Chris first on their "The Pennsylvania Report 100" list of influential Republican figures in Pennsylvania politics. It noted that Gleason was "a hard worker and efficient manager of the state GOP." Gleason currently serves as a member of the Catholic Advisory Committee of the Republican National Committee.

In 2021, Gleason was named to the Pennsylvania Fifty Over 50 Power List by City and State PA Magazine.

Political offices
Preceded by William Davis	Secretary of the Commonwealth of Pennsylvania; 1985–1987	Succeeded by James Haggerty
Party political offices
Preceded by Eileen Melvin	Chair of the Pennsylvania Republican Party; 2006–2017	Succeeded by Val DiGiorgio
