= Anne Anstine =

American politician

Member of the Republican National Committee from Pennsylvania
- In office June 8, 1996 – May 23, 1997
- Preceded by: Elsie Hillman
- Succeeded by: Christine Torretti

Chairwoman of the Pennsylvania Republican Party
- In office February 12, 1990 – June 8, 1996
- Preceded by: Earl Baker
- Succeeded by: Alan Novak

Personal details
- Born: March 27, 1924
- Died: May 23, 1997 (aged 73) Juniata County, Pennsylvania
- Political party: Republican

Anne Anstine (March 27, 1924 – May 23, 1997) was an American politician who was a member of the Republican National Committee and Chairwoman of the Pennsylvania Republican Party.

== Political career ==
Anstine joined the Pennsylvania Republican Party's state committee in 1963. During the mid to late 1970s, she worked on the first campaign for the United States Senate of fellow Republican John Heinz. In 1978, she also served as the recruitment chair of the Pennsylvania Council of Republican Women.

During the 1980s, she served as special assistant to the Speaker of the Pennsylvania House of Representatives, H. Jack Seltzer, and was elected to the post of vice president of the Pennsylvania Republican Party.

In 1990, she became the chair of the Pennsylvania Republican Party, a position she held until 1996, when she resigned for health reasons. She was subsequently chosen as one of two delegates from Pennsylvania to serve on the Republican National Committee.

During the 1994 gubernatorial primary season, she was credited with maintaining broad Republican Party support for Tom Ridge.

== Later years ==
Anstine spent her later years in Juniata County, Pennsylvania, where she owned a farm and farm supply business.

== Illness, death and interment ==
Diagnosed with cancer in 1988, Anstine battled the disease for nine years before she died at her home in Port Royal, Juniata County on May 23, 1997.
