= Alan Novak =

American attorney & politician

Chairman of the Pennsylvania Republican Party
- In office June 8, 1996 – December 4, 2004
- Preceded by: Anne Anstine
- Succeeded by: Eileen Melvin

Chairman of the Republican Committee of Chester County
- In office July 18, 1994 – June 8, 1996
- Preceded by: Sue Ellen Katancik
- Succeeded by: Skip Brion

Personal details
- Born: August 29, 1949 (age 77)
- Party: Republican
- Education: Ursinus College; Villanova University Law School
- Profession: Attorney

Alan Paul Novak is a Pennsylvania attorney and former chairman of the Pennsylvania Republican Party, a position he held from 1996 to 2004. During his tenure, he became known for his skill with statewide judicial elections.

As at attorney with Conrad O'Brien PC, he practices business and municipal law, zoning, real estate transactions, business and corporate formation, and government relations.

Prior to working as chair of the Pennsylvania Republican Party, he was chair of the Chester County Republican party.

He was named to the 2002 and 2003 PoliticsPA "Sy Snyder's Power 50" of influential people in Pennsylvania politics. In 2010, Politics Magazine named him one of the most influential Republicans in Pennsylvania.

An alumnus of Ursinus College, he has served as the Chair of the college's Board of Trustees since 2012.
