= 1946 Pennsylvania gubernatorial election =

- November 5, 1946
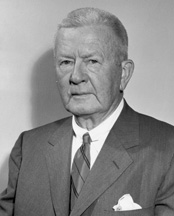

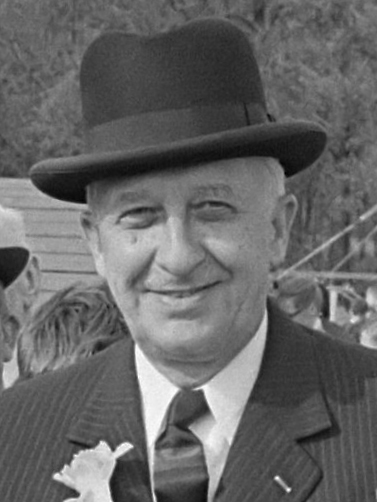
| Nominee | Jim Duff | John Rice |
| Party | Republican | Democratic |
| Running mate | Dan Strickler | John Dent |
| Popular vote | 1,828,462 | 1,270,947 |
| Percentage | 58.53% | 40.68% |
- County results Duff: 50–60% 60–70% 70–80% 80–90% Rice: 40–50% 50–60%
Governor before election
John Bell
Republican
Elected Governor
Jim Duff
Republican

The 1946 Pennsylvania gubernatorial election was held on November 5, 1946. Republican Party nominee James H. Duff defeated Democratic Party nominee John S. Rice to become Governor of Pennsylvania. As of 2026, this was the last time Philadelphia County voted for the Republican candidate.

== Democratic primary ==
=== Candidates ===
- Henry Arthur Morris, music store operator from Mahanoy City
- John S. Rice, former state senator from Gettysburg

The endorsed candidates for Democratic Party won by a large margin, with Rice winning by a three-quarters of the vote over Mahanoy City businessman Henry Morris.

=== Results ===
Democratic primary results Rice: 50%–60%; 60%–70%; 70%–80%; 80%–90%; 90%–100%; Morris: 50%–60%

Pennsylvania gubernatorial Democratic primary election, 1946
| Party | Candidate | Votes | % |
|---|---|---|---|
| Democratic | John Rice | 279,503 | 72.25 |
| Democratic | Henry Arthur Morris | 107,338 | 27.75 |
| Total votes | | 386,841 | 100.00 |

== Republican primary ==
=== Candidates ===
- James H. Duff, Attorney General of Pennsylvania
- Carl Mau, newspaper publisher and World War II veteran from Marcus Hook
- John Shroyer, Secretary of Highways

The endorsed candidate for the Republican Party won by a large margin, with Duff earning over three-quarters of the vote against outgoing Secretary of Highways John Shroyer of Shamokin.

=== Results ===
Republican primary results Duff: 50%–60%; 60%–70%; 70%–80%; 80%–90%; 90%–100%; Shroyer: 50%–60%; 70%–80%

Pennsylvania gubernatorial Republican primary election, 1946
| Party | Candidate | Votes | % |
|---|---|---|---|
| Republican | Jim Duff | 725,567 | 77.01 |
| Republican | John Shroyer | 182,256 | 19.34 |
| Republican | Carl Mau | 34,367 | 3.65 |
| Total votes | | 942,199 | 100.00 |

== General election ==
=== Candidates ===
- Jim Duff, State Attorney General (from Allegheny County) (Republican)
  - Running mate: Dan Strickler, former State Representative and World War II general (from Lancaster County)
- James Killip (Prohibition)
- John Rice, former President pro tempore of the Pennsylvania Senate (from Adams County) (Democratic)
  - Running mate: John Dent, President pro tempore of the Pennsylvania Senate (from Westmoreland County)
- George Taylor (Socialist Labor)

=== Campaign ===
A close confidant of popular outgoing Governor Ed Martin, who was running for a US Senate seat, Duff was the clear favorite throughout the campaign. Duff ran as a moderate progressive but also as a hardline anti-communist. He promised to address the key topic of labor strife by limiting strikes and cracking down on union criminal activity while concurrently increasing the minimum wage. Duff also vowed to spur innovation amongst the state's fragmented local governments.

=== Results ===
Pennsylvania gubernatorial election, 1946
| Party | Candidate | Votes | % |
|---|---|---|---|
| Republican | Jim Duff | 1,828,462 | 58.52 |
| Democratic | John S. Rice | 1,270,947 | 40.68 |
| Prohibition | James Killip | 13,833 | 0.44 |
| Socialist Labor | George Taylor | 10,747 | 0.34 |
| Total votes | | 3,099,409 | 100.00 |
