= 1956 United States Senate election in Pennsylvania =

- November 6, 1956
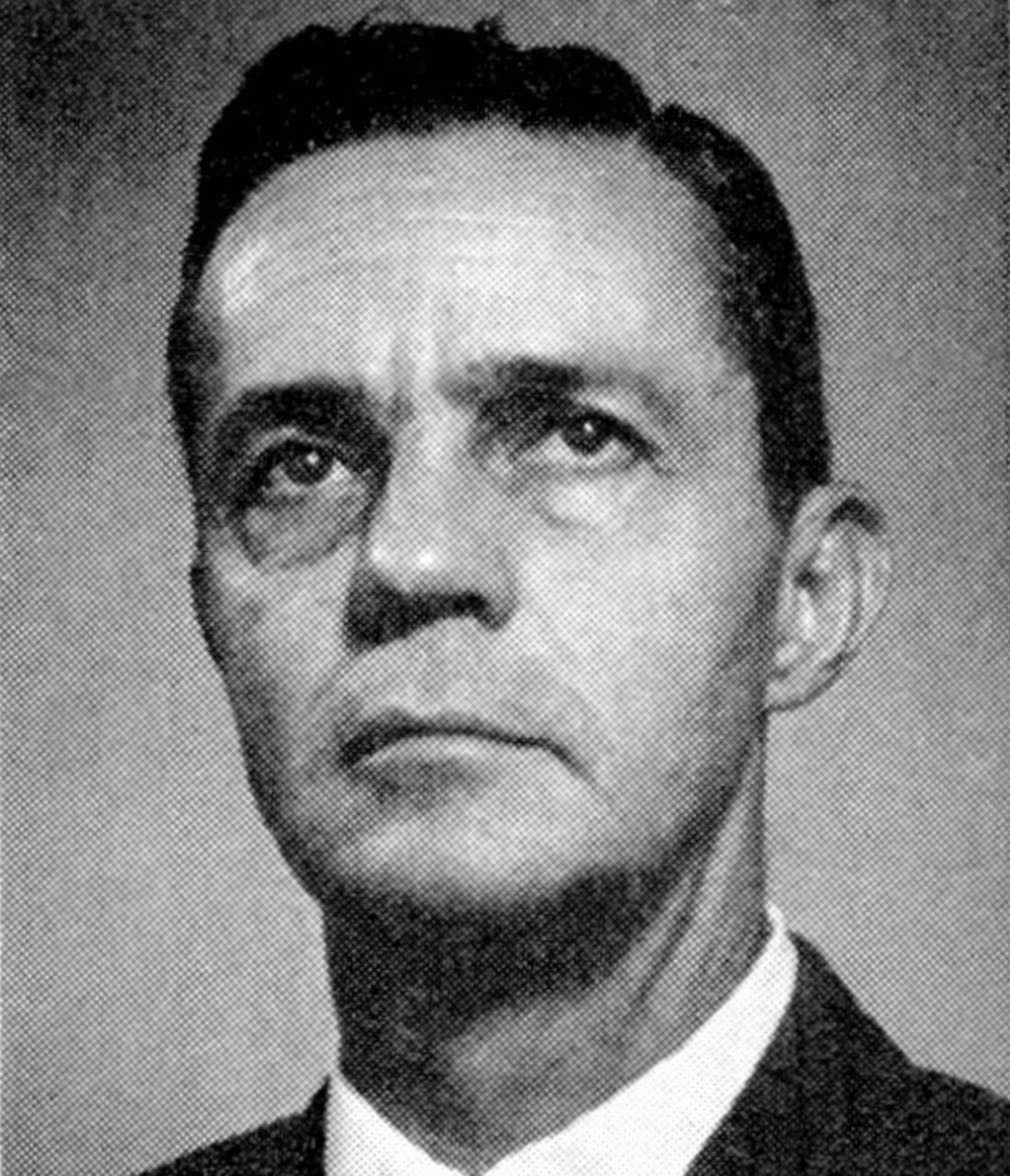

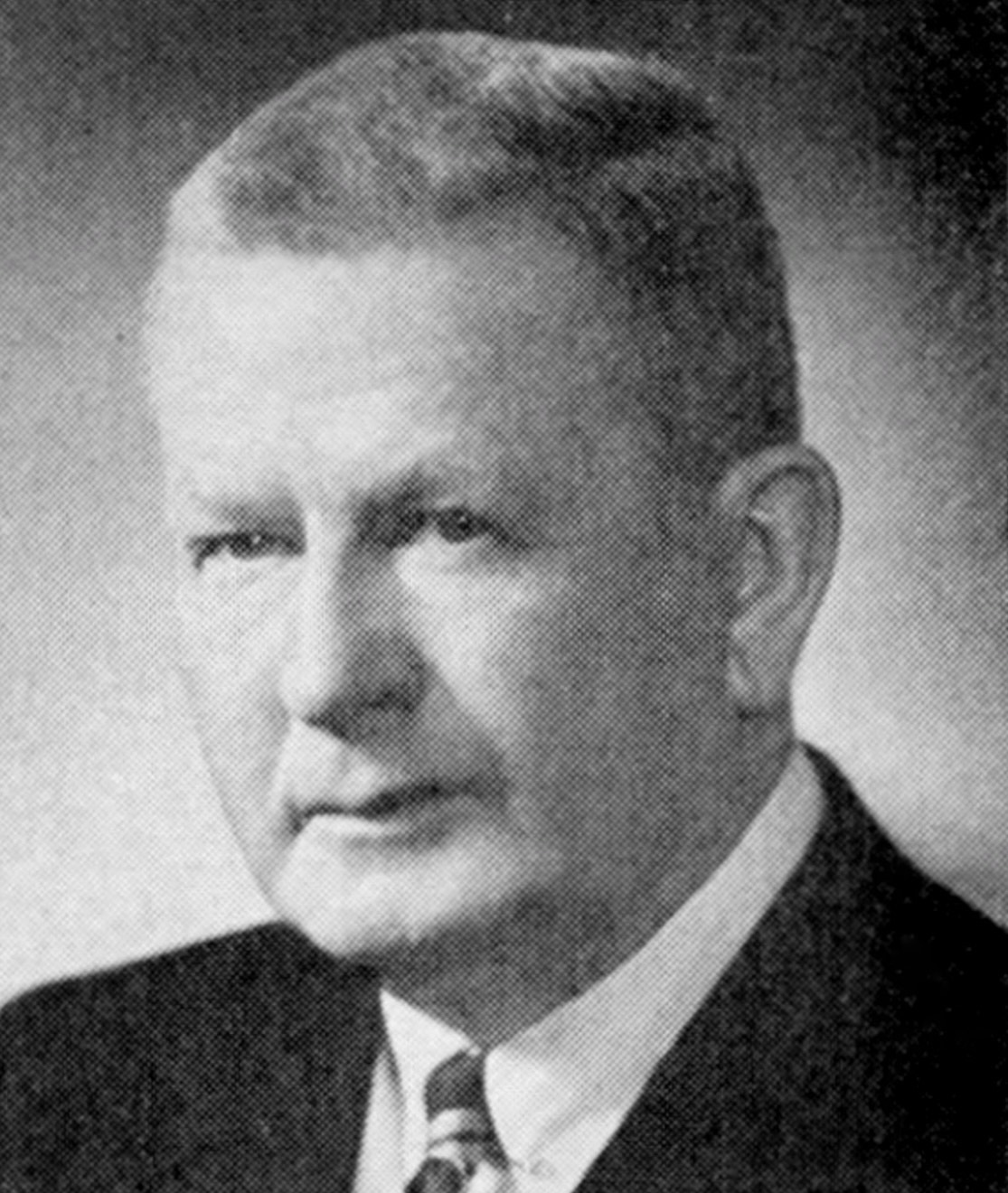
Nominee	Joseph S. Clark Jr.	James H. Duff
Party	Democratic	Republican
Popular vote	2,268,641	2,250,671
Percentage	50.08%	49.69%
- County results Clark Jr.: 50–60% 60–70% Duff: 40–50% 50–60% 60–70% 70–80%
U.S. senator before election
James H. Duff
Republican
Elected U.S. Senator
Joseph S. Clark, Jr.
Democratic

The 1956 United States Senate election in Pennsylvania was held on November 6, 1956. Incumbent Republican U.S. Senator James H. Duff sought re-election to another term, but was defeated by the Democratic nominee, Joseph S. Clark, Jr.

== General election ==
=== Candidates ===
- Joseph S. Clark Jr., former Mayor of Philadelphia (Democratic)
- James H. Duff, incumbent U.S. Senator (Republican)
- Herbert G. Lewin (Militant Workers)
- George S. Taylor (Socialist Labor)

=== Campaign ===
The 1956 Senate election in Pennsylvania featured two prominent and well-known candidates: a former Philadelphia mayor in the challenger, Clark, and the ambitious former Governor Duff who had considered running for higher office. Clark, in his run for mayor, upset the Republican Party machine in Philadelphia and contributed to a political realignment in the city that would tip it in favor of the Democrats and help him in his 1956 campaign for Senate. In 1950, when Duff was elected, Republicans were 70% of the two-party vote registration in Philadelphia, but held only a two-point advantage there in 1956.

Duff ran as an ally to Republican President Dwight D. Eisenhower, who was also running for re-election, and criticized Clark for his spending and tax policies as Philadelphia mayor. In addition to criticizing Duff in return for his poor attendance record in the Senate (which was one of the worst at the time), Clark criticized the Eisenhower administration's foreign policy.

In the end, Clark narrowly defeated the incumbent Duff by just under 18,000 votes. The result was not known definitively until 50,000 military ballots had been counted and despite Duff's loss, Eisenhower carried the state in the presidential election and the Republicans won every other statewide race in 1956. Clark carried Southwest Pennsylvania, notwithstanding the harm his Philadelphia ties might have cost him there, as well as his home of Philadelphia, while Duff won much of the conservative "central T".

=== Results ===
General election results
Party	Candidate	Votes	%	±%
Democratic	Joseph S. Clark, Jr.	2,268,641	50.08%	
Republican	James H. Duff (incumbent)	2,250,671	49.69%	
Socialist Labor	George S. Taylor	7,447	0.16%	
Militant Workers	Herbert G. Lewin	2,035	0.05%	
Democratic gain from Republican				

== See also ==
- 1956 United States Senate elections
