= Eileen Melvin =

American businesswoman

President & CEO, UMF Medical
- Incumbent
- Assumed office September 2009

Chairwoman of the Pennsylvania Republican Party
- In office 2004–2006
- Preceded by: Alan Novak
- Succeeded by: Rob Gleason

Personal details
- Education: Boston College; American University
- Profession: Businesswoman

Eileen Melvin is an American businesswoman who is the president and CEO of UMF Medical in Johnstown, Pennsylvania.

She was named on the 2003 PoliticsPA list of Pennsylvania's Most Politically Powerful Women.

== Education ==
Melvin earned a degree from Boston College and a Master of Public Administration from American University.

== Career ==
Melvin began her career working at the American Enterprise Institute in Washington, DC and as a Legislative Aide to Senator John Heinz, specializing in health care issues of the Senate Finance Committee, and as a member of the Reagan Transition team.

For ten years, Melvin was president of Economic Development Strategies, a Woman Business Enterprise (WBE), guiding businesses and municipalities with projects to preserve and increase job creation.

She was appointed by Governor Mark Schweiker in 2002 and reappointed by Governor Rendell in 2007 to the Pennsylvania Unemployment Compensation Board of Review (UCBR). Both appointments were approved by the Pennsylvania Senate. In 2012, Governor Tom Corbett appointed her as chairman of the UCBR.

In 1996, Melvin was unanimously elected vice-chair, and later chair of the Pennsylvania Republican Party in 2005. Melvin served a total of 10 years through numerous victories, including the election of Governor Ridge, U.S. Senators Rick Santorum and Arlen Specter, and winning majorities of the PA Congressional delegation, state legislature, and appellate courts. She was appointed by Senators Specter and Santorum to the Federal Judicial Nominating Committing and served for 12 years.

In 2003, Melvin was named to the PoliticsPA list of Pennsylvania's Most Politically Powerful Women.

Melvin was named president and CEO of United Metal Fabricators, Inc. in 2009 and rebranded in 2012 as UMF Medical. The company is a manufacturer of exam and procedure room equipment for hospitals, physician offices, and clinics around the world.
