= Dick Schulze =

American politician (1929–2025)

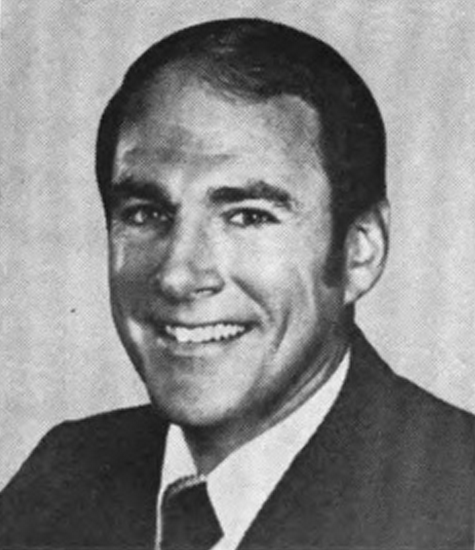

Member of the U.S. House of Representatives from Pennsylvania's 5th district
- In office January 3, 1975 – January 3, 1993
- Preceded by: John H. Ware III
- Succeeded by: Curt Weldon (redistricted)

Member of the Pennsylvania House of Representatives from the 157th district
- In office January 5, 1971 – November 30, 1974
- Preceded by: John Stauffer
- Succeeded by: Peter Vroon

Personal details
- Born: Richard Taylor Schulze; August 7, 1929 Philadelphia, Pennsylvania, U.S.
- Died: December 23, 2025 (aged 96) Washington D.C., U.S.
- Party: Republican
- Spouse(s): Anne Lockwood (m. 1955; died 1990) Nancy Senechal Waltermire
- Children: 4
- Education: University of Houston (attended); Villanova University (attended); Temple University (attended)

Richard Taylor Schulze (August 7, 1929 – December 23, 2025) was an American businessman and politician from Pennsylvania who served as a member of the United States House of Representatives for nine terms representing Pennsylvania's 5th congressional district from 1975 to 1993. His district encompassed portions of Montgomery, Delaware, and Chester Counties in the western Philadelphia suburbs. He was a member of the Republican Party.

== Early life and career ==
Schulze was born in Philadelphia, Pennsylvania. He graduated from Haverford High School in 1948, and attended the University of Houston in 1949, Villanova University in 1952, and Temple University in 1968. He served in the United States Army from 1951 to 1953 and worked in the appliance business in Paoli, Pennsylvania. Schulze entered politics serving as Register of Wills of Chester County from 1967 to 1969, before he was elected to the Pennsylvania House of Representatives, where he served two terms.

== Congressional career ==
During his career in the United States House of Representatives, Schulze rose to serve as a-top ranking member on the House Ways and Means Committee and the senior Republican member on the Oversight Subcommittee. He also served on the Armed Services Committee and Banking. He chaired the Republican Study Committee, and was the Republican Whip for Pennsylvania. Ronald Reagan appointed Schulze to the Presidential Advisory Committee on Federalism. Schulze was one of the "Reagan 13".

Schulze also served on the Natural Resources Committee and was a former member of the Migratory Bird Commission. George H. W. Bush appointed Schulze to serve on the Board of the National Fish and Wildlife Foundation. He also founded the Congressional Sportsmen's Caucus and Foundation in 1990. Schulze served as Chairman of the National Prayer Breakfast, and has been a member of the House of Representatives weekly prayer breakfast for over 30 years.

== Post-congressional career ==
After leaving Congress, Schulze became a consultant to Valis Associates, a Republican firm, on issues involving energy, transportation, free trade, business taxes, Environmental law of business, and Gun politics in the United States.

== Personal life and death ==
Schulze married Anne Nancy Lockwood in 1955, and they had four children, and were married until her death from breast cancer on February 16, 1990. He then married Nancy Waltermire (née Senechal), widow of former Montana Secretary of State Jim Waltermire. Schulze died of heart failure at his home in Washington D.C., on December 23, 2025, at the age of 96.

U.S. House of Representatives
| Preceded by John H. Ware III | Member of the U.S. House of Representatives from Pennsylvania's 5th congressional district 1975–1993 | Succeeded by William Clinger |
Party political offices
| Preceded by Dave Treen | Chair of the Republican Study Committee; 1979–1980 | Succeeded by John Rousselot |
| Preceded by John Rousselot | Chair of the Republican Study Committee; 1981–1983 | Succeeded by Phil Crane |
U.S. order of precedence (ceremonial)
| Preceded by Cathy McMorris Rodgers as Former U.S. Representative | Order of precedence of the United States as Former U.S. Representative | Succeeded by Bill Shuster as Former U.S. Representative |
