= Earl M. Baker =

American politician (1940–2024)

Member of the Pennsylvania Senate from the 19th district
- In office January 3, 1989 – August 31, 1995
- Preceded by: John Stauffer
- Succeeded by: Bob Thompson

Chairman of the Pennsylvania Republican Party
- In office February 8, 1986 – February 12, 1990
- Preceded by: Bob Asher
- Succeeded by: Anne Anstine

Member of the Chester County Board of Commissioners
- In office January 5, 1976 – January 4, 1988
- Succeeded by: Dominic Marrone

Personal details
- Born: January 22, 1940 Philadelphia, Pennsylvania, U.S.
- Died: April 25, 2024 (aged 84)
- Party: Republican

Earl Mancill Baker (January 22, 1940 – April 25, 2024) was an American politician from Pennsylvania who served as a Republican member of the Pennsylvania State Senate for the 19th district from 1989 to 1995. Baker also served twelve years as a member of the Chester County Board of Commissioners, and as Chairman of the Pennsylvania Republican Party from 1986 to 1990.

== Early life and education ==
Baker was born in Philadelphia, Pennsylvania and graduated from Ben Lippen High School. He received an A.B. in political science from University of North Carolina, Chapel Hill and a M.A. and Ph.D. in government from American University in Washington, D.C..

Baker served as an officer in the U.S. Navy. He worked for The American Political Science Association in Washington and taught at Temple University before entering public service.

== Career ==
Baker did not seek re-election to the Board of Commissioners in 1988, opting instead to run for the State Senate seat being vacated by retiring incumbent John Stauffer. In the primary election, he defeated State Rep. Peter Vroon.

== Death ==
Baker died on April 25, 2024, at the age of 84.
