= 1950 United States Senate election in Pennsylvania =

- November 7, 1950
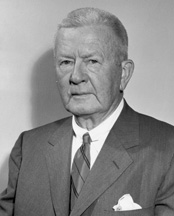

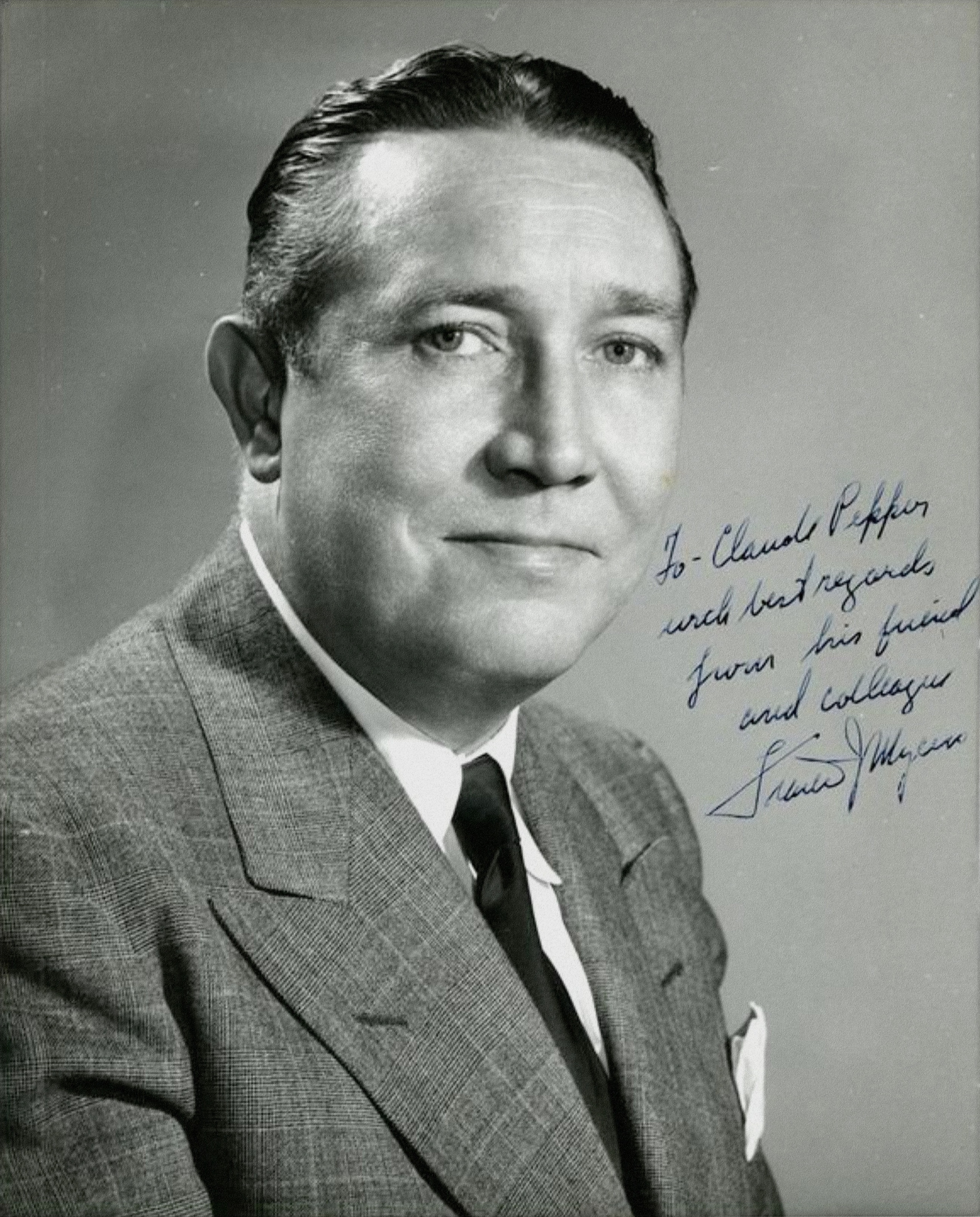
Nominee	James H. Duff	Francis J. Myers
Party	Republican	Democratic
Popular vote	1,820,400	1,694,076
Percentage	51.30%	47.74%
- County results Duff: 50–60% 60–70% 70–80% Myers: 40–50% 50–60% 60–70%
U.S. senator before election
Francis J. Myers
Democratic
Elected U.S. Senator
James H. Duff
Republican

The 1950 United States Senate election in Pennsylvania was held on November 7, 1950. Incumbent Democratic U.S. Senator Francis J. Myers sought re-election, but was defeated by Republican nominee James H. Duff. As of 2026, this is the last time that Lycoming County voted Democratic in a Senate election.

== General election ==
=== Candidates ===
- Earl N. Bergerstock (Prohibition)
- James H. Duff, Governor of Pennsylvania (Republican)
- Frank Knotek (Socialist Labor)
- Francis J. Myers, incumbent U.S. Senator (Democratic)
- Lillian R. Narins, peace activist (Progressive)
- Jack Still (GIs Against Communism)
- Clyde A. Turner (Militant Workers)
- William J. Van Essen (Socialist)

== Results ==
General election results
Party	Candidate	Votes	%	±%
Republican	James H. Duff	1,820,400	51.30%	
Democratic	Francis J. Myers (incumbent)	1,694,076	47.74%	
Prohibition	Earl N. Bergerstock	12,618	0.36%	
Independent	Jack Still	8,353	0.24%	
Progressive	Lillian R. Narins	5,516	0.16%	
Socialist	William J. Van Essen	4,864	0.14%	
Socialist Labor	Frank Knotek	1,596	0.05%	
Militant Workers	Clyde A. Turner	1,219	0.03%	
Republican gain from Democratic				
