= Peter Vroon =

American politician

Peter R. Vroon

Member of the Pennsylvania House of Representatives from the 157th district
- In office January 7, 1975 – November 30, 1992
- Preceded by: Richard Schultze
- Succeeded by: Carole A. Rubley

Personal details
- Born: January 6, 1917 Grand Rapids, Michigan
- Died: April 8, 1997 (aged 80) Paoli, Pennsylvania
- Party: Republican

Peter R. Vroon (January 6, 1917 – April 8, 1997) was a Republican member of the Pennsylvania House of Representatives. In 1988, Vroon ran for the State Senate from the 19th district, but was defeated in the Republican primary by County Commissioner Earl Baker.

He is the father of Donald Vroon, music critic and the editor of American Record Guide.
