= 1952 United States Senate election in Pennsylvania =

- November 4, 1952
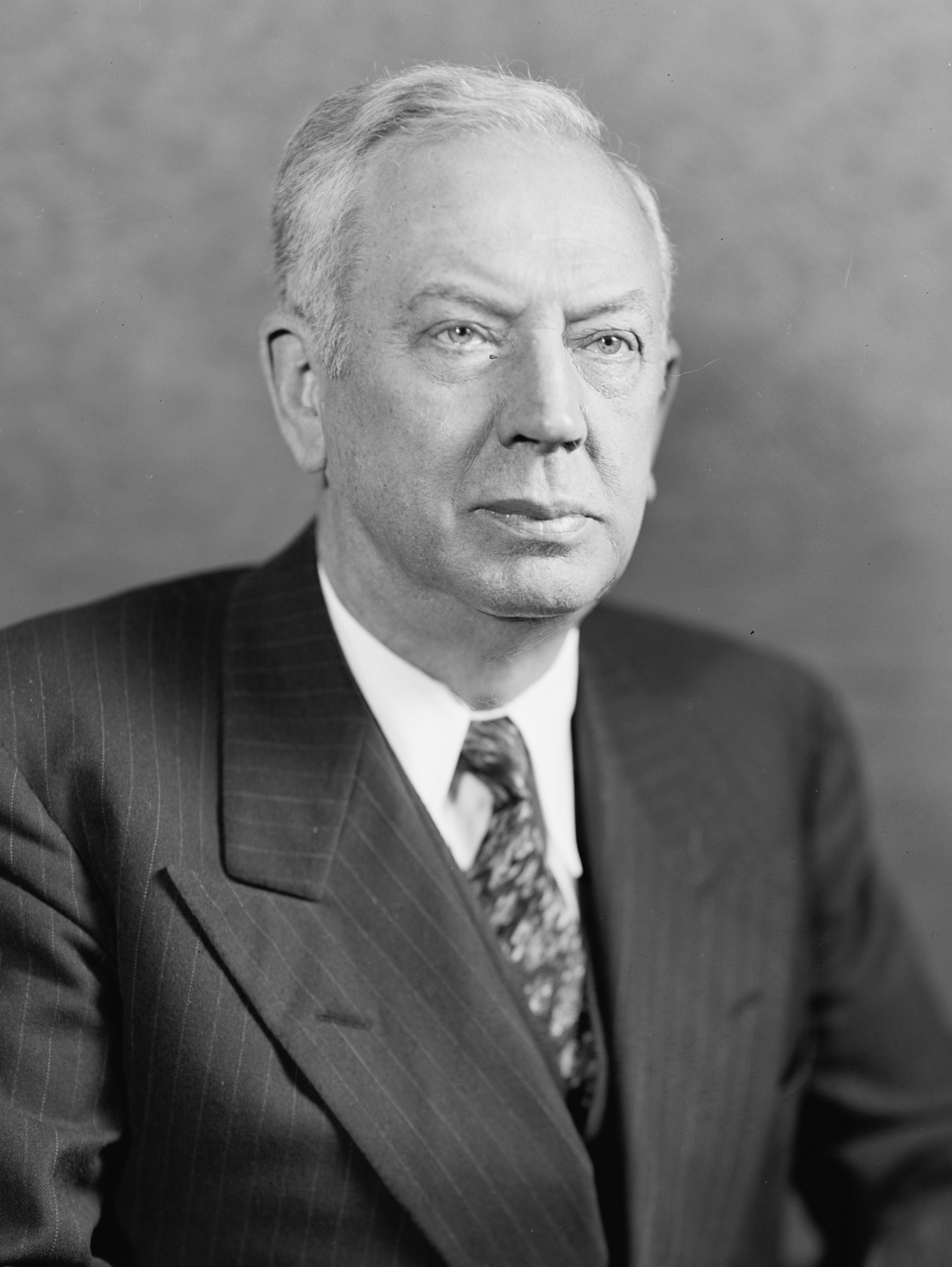

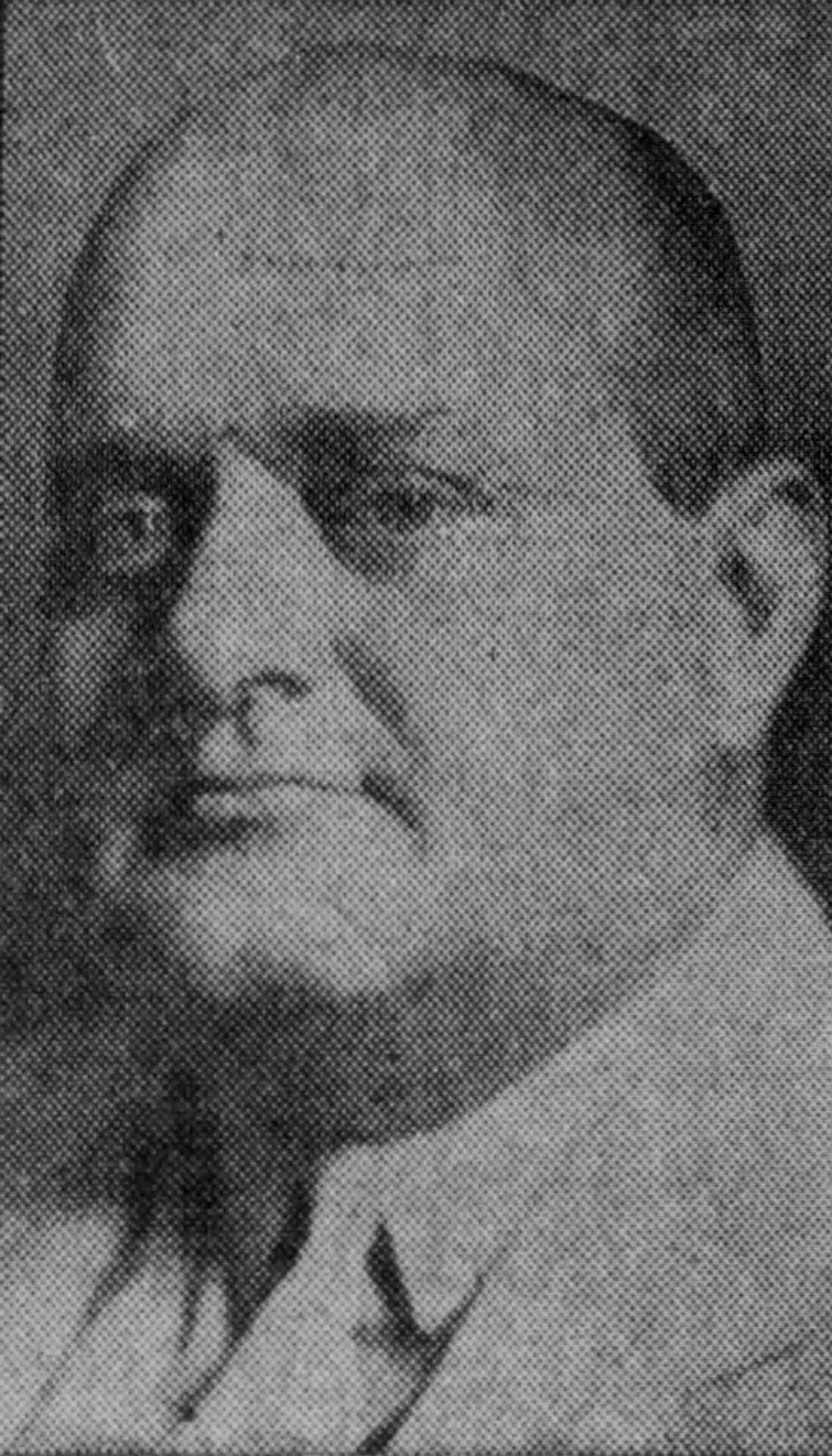
| Nominee | Edward Martin | Guy K. Bard |
| Party | Republican | Democratic |
| Popular vote | 2,331,034 | 2,168,546 |
| Percentage | 51.58% | 47.98% |
- County results Martin: 40–50% 50–60% 60–70% 70–80% Bard: 40–50% 50–60% 60–70%
U.S. senator before election
Edward Martin
Republican
Elected U.S. Senator
Edward Martin
Republican

The 1952 United States Senate election in Pennsylvania was held on November 4, 1952. Incumbent Republican U.S. Senator Edward Martin successfully sought re-election to another term, defeating the Democratic nominee, Guy K. Bard.

== General election ==
=== Candidates ===
- Guy K. Bard, Judge of the United States District Court for the Eastern District of Pennsylvania (Democratic)
- Anna Chester (Militant Workers)
- Frank Knotek (Independent Government)
- Edward Martin, incumbent U.S. Senator (Republican)
- Ira S. Sassaman (Prohibition)
- William J. Van Essen (Socialist)

=== Results ===
General election results
| Party | Candidate | Votes | % | ±% |
|---|---|---|---|---|
| Republican | Edward Martin (inc.) | 2,331,034 | 51.58% | −7.68% |
| Democratic | Guy K. Bard | 2,168,546 | 47.98% | +8.17% |
| Prohibition | Ira S. Sassaman | 12,150 | 0.27% | −0.29% |
| Socialist | William J. Van Essen | 3,538 | 0.08% | +0.08% |
| Militant Workers | Anna Chester | 2,258 | 0.05% | +0.05% |
| Independent Government | Frank Knotek | 1,897 | 0.04% | +0.04% |
| Total votes | | 4,519,423 | 100.00% | |
| Republican hold | | | | |
