= Craig Truax =

American politician (1928–1985)

Secretary of the Commonwealth of Pennsylvania
- In office 1967–1968
- Governor: Raymond P. Shafer
- Preceded by: W. Stuart Helm
- Succeeded by: Joseph J. Kelley

Chairman of the Republican State Committee of Pennsylvania
- In office 1963–1967
- Preceded by: George I. Bloom
- Succeeded by: John C. Jordan

Personal details
- Born: December 29, 1928 Gosport, Indiana
- Died: December 28, 1985 (aged 56) Camp Hill, Pennsylvania
- Party: Republican

Combs Craig Truax (December 29, 1928 – December 28, 1985) was an American political aide who served as Chairman of the Republican State Committee of Pennsylvania from 1963 to 1967 and Secretary of the Commonwealth of Pennsylvania from 1967 to 1968.

== Early life ==
Truax was born in Gosport, Indiana. He served in the United States Army from 1946 to 1947 and the United States Navy from 1951 to 1954. He moved to Pennsylvania in 1954 to become editor of the Wellsboro Gazette.

== Career ==
Truax worked as a publicist for the Pennsylvania Republican state committee during the 1956 United States presidential election. He became an assistant to the majority leader of the Pennsylvania House of Representatives in 1957, but soon returned to the state committee as an assistant to the chairman. In 1959, he was named executive director. In 1963, he succeeded George I. Bloom as party chairman after Bloom became Secretary of the Commonwealth. Truax was appointed Secretary of the Commonwealth in 1967 by Governor Raymond P. Shafer. He resigned on January 1, 1968, to become director of programs for the Pennsylvania House Republican Caucus, a job he held until his death on December 28, 1985.
