= Donald Vroon =

- Born: July 1942 (age 83–84); New Jersey, United States
- Genres: Classical
- Occupations: programming director, Methodist minister

Donald Richard Vroon (born 1942) is an American music critic, chief editor and co-owner of American Record Guide, a bi-monthly magazine containing reviews of classical music events, compact discs, DVDs, and books related to classical music as well as a section on classical musicians and ensembles.

== Work in radio ==
He also worked in radio, at WNYC in 1976 (programming) and as a classical music host at WNED-FM (1977 to 1985) and overnight at WGUC (from 1985 to 1987).

== Work in print media ==
Vroon began writing for the American Record Guide in 1983. He became its chief editor and co-owner with his husband, Plein Air artist Ray Hassard, in 1987, moving its headquarters to Cincinnati. In July 2014 Rowman & Littlefield published a book entitled Classical Music in a Changing Culture: Essays from the American Record Guide, a collection of essays from his "Critical Convictions" column in the magazine. As Vroon argues, since all criticism is cultural criticism, music criticism in the broadest sense—from its composition to its distribution to its reception—is a window onto broader culture issues.

== Family and early years ==
Vroon is the son of Peter R. Vroon, former Republican member of the Pennsylvania House of Representatives.

According to biographical sources, Vroon grew up in New York and listened only to classical music. He developed an interest in theology, which led him to earn a Master of Theology degree (ThM) degree from Princeton Theological Seminary in 1968. He worked as a Methodist minister from 1964 to 1972 and as a part-time instructor of Christian ethics at the University of Buffalo from 1982 to 1985.
