= John C. Bell Jr. =

American judge

John Cromwell Bell Jr.
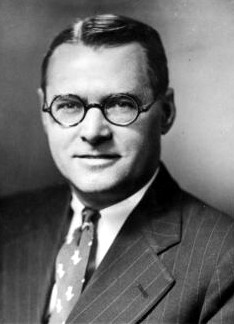
- Photo used in Bell's 1942 lieutenant governor campaign

Chief Justice of the Supreme Court of Pennsylvania
- In office 1961–1972
- Preceded by: Charles Alvin Jones
- Succeeded by: Benjamin R. Jones

Justice of the Supreme Court of Pennsylvania
- In office 1950–1961

33rd Governor of Pennsylvania
- In office January 2, 1947 – January 21, 1947
- Lieutenant: M. Harvey Taylor (Acting); Weldon B. Heyburn (Acting)^{[a]}
- Preceded by: Edward Martin
- Succeeded by: James H. Duff

18th Lieutenant Governor of Pennsylvania
- In office January 20, 1943 – January 2, 1947
- Governor: Edward Martin
- Preceded by: Samuel S. Lewis
- Succeeded by: Daniel B. Strickler^{[b]}

Personal details
- Born: October 25, 1892 Philadelphia, Pennsylvania, U.S.
- Died: March 18, 1974 (aged 81) Montgomery County, Pennsylvania, U.S.
- Party: Republican
- Spouse: Sarah Andrews Baker (m.1918)
- Children: 5
- Education: University of Pennsylvania
- Profession: Attorney, Politician, Judge
- a.By virtue of their positions as President Pro Tempore of the State Senate, Taylor (from January 3 through January 7) and Heyburn (from January 2 through January 21) served as Acting Lieutenant Governor for the duration of Bell's governorship. b.Strickler was the next permanent holder of the lieutenant governorship; he did not assume office until Duff was inaugurated as governor.

John Cromwell Bell Jr. (October 25, 1892 – March 18, 1974) was an American lawyer, politician, and judge. He was the 18th lieutenant governor of Pennsylvania (1943–1947) before becoming the 33rd and shortest-serving governor of Pennsylvania, serving for nineteen days in 1947. He was later a justice of the Pennsylvania Supreme Court (1950–1972), serving as Chief Justice from 1961 to 1972.

== Early life and education ==
John Bell was born in Philadelphia, Pennsylvania, to John Cromwell Bell and Fleurette deBenneville (Myers) Bell. His father served as District Attorney of Philadelphia (1903–1907) and Attorney General of Pennsylvania (1911–1915). His maternal grandfather was Leonard Myers, who served as a U.S. Representative from 1863 to 1875. He was the older brother of Bert Bell, who was commissioner of the National Football League (1946–1959).

After graduating from the Episcopal Academy in 1910, Bell received a Bachelor of Arts degree (1914) and a Bachelor of Laws degree (1917) from the University of Pennsylvania. He played on the varsity soccer and tennis teams during college. At Penn, he was a member of Saint Anthony Hall. He was admitted to the bar in 1917 and commenced private practice, eventually becoming a senior partner of the law firm Bell, Murdoch, Paxson and Dilworth. In 1918, he married Sarah Andrews Baker; the couple had three sons and two daughters.

== Political career ==
In 1919, Bell was appointed assistant city solicitor of Philadelphia, a position he held for three years. He then served as assistant district attorney of Philadelphia from 1922 to 1925. He later earned a reputation as a strong opponent of President Franklin D. Roosevelt's New Deal policies, publishing such booklets as Can We Think and Dare We Speak (1934), What Do You Know About the New Deal? (1935), and New Deal Fairy Tales (1936). He was finance chairman for Arthur H. James in the 1938 gubernatorial election, and later served as vice-chairman of the Republican State Finance Committee. From 1939 to 1942, he was Pennsylvania Secretary of Banking under Governor James.

In 1942, Bell was elected Lieutenant Governor of Pennsylvania after defeating Democrat Elmer Kilroy, the Speaker of the Pennsylvania House of Representatives, by more than 235,000 votes. When Governor Edward Martin resigned to take a seat in the United States Senate in 1947, Bell automatically succeeded him as governor. He served from January 2 to 21, 1947, when James Duff, who had been elected in 1946 gubernatorial election, took the oath of office. His nineteen-day tenure remains the shortest of any Pennsylvania Governor.

== Later career ==
Appointed by Governor Duff, Bell became a justice of the Supreme Court of Pennsylvania in 1951. He later served as Chief Justice from August 1961 until his retirement in January 1972. During his tenure, he maintained conservative views and often dissented if he felt court decisions were too liberal. He supported having judges nominated by a panel of lawyers and appointed by the governor instead of the current process of being elected by the public. He resigned from the Philadelphia Bar Association in 1965 in protest of their policies, and ordered an investigation of the Allegheny County Common Pleas Court in 1966 for irregularities. After retiring from the court, Bell lived in Wynnewood and served as a special assistant to the local district attorney.

He died on March 18, 1974 at age 81, and is buried at St. Asaph Cemetery in Bala Cynwyd.

Political offices
Preceded by Samuel Lewis	Lieutenant Governor of Pennsylvania; 1943–1947	Succeeded by Daniel Strickler^{1}
Preceded by Edward Martin	Governor of Pennsylvania; 1947	Succeeded by James Duff
Party political offices
Preceded by Samuel Lewis	Republican nominee for Lieutenant Governor of Pennsylvania; 1942	Succeeded by Daniel Strickler
Notes and references
1. Succeeded as Acting Lieutenant Governor by Harvey Taylor and Weldon Heyburn
