= M. Harvey Taylor =

American politician

Harvey Taylor

President pro tempore of the Pennsylvania Senate
- In office January 1, 1963 – November 30, 1964
- Preceded by: Anthony J. DiSilvestro
- Succeeded by: James Berger
- In office March 17, 1947 – January 3, 1961
- Preceded by: Weldon Brinton Heyburn
- Succeeded by: Anthony J. DiSilvestro
- In office January 2, 1947 – January 7, 1947
- Preceded by: Charles H. Ealy
- Succeeded by: Weldon Brinton Heyburn

Lieutenant Governor of Pennsylvania Acting^{[a]}
- In office January 2, 1947 – January 7, 1947
- Governor: John Bell
- Preceded by: John Bell
- Succeeded by: Weldon Heyburn^{[a]}

Chairman of the Pennsylvania Republican Party
- In office June 6, 1942 – June 19, 1954
- Preceded by: James F. Torrance
- Succeeded by: Miles Horst
- In office June 9, 1934 – June 30, 1937
- Preceded by: Edward Martin
- Succeeded by: G. Edward Green

Member of the Pennsylvania Senate from the 15th district
- In office January 7, 1941 – November 30, 1964
- Preceded by: George Kunkel
- Succeeded by: William Lentz

Personal details
- Born: Maris Harvey Taylor; June 4, 1876 Harrisburg, Pennsylvania, U.S.
- Died: May 16, 1982 (aged 105) Susquehanna Township, Dauphin County, Pennsylvania, U.S.
- Party: Republican
- Occupation: Insurance agent Businessman; Politician
- a.By virtue of their positions as President Pro Tempore of the State Senate, Taylor (from January 3 through January 7) and Heyburn (from January 7 through January 21) served as Acting Lieutenant Governor for the duration of Bell's governorship.

Maris Harvey Taylor (June 4, 1876 – May 16, 1982) was an American politician from Pennsylvania who served as a Republican member of the Pennsylvania Senate for the 15th district from 1941 to 1964 including as President pro tempore from 1945 to 1964. He was a political boss who held multiple political positions in Dauphin County and statewide.

== Early life ==
Taylor was born in the Shipoke neighborhood of Harrisburg, Pennsylvania, to Maurice and Kate Taylor. He dropped out of school in 1888 to work as a laborer with his father at Central Iron Works (later Central Iron & Steel Company), where he worked for 24 years. He was signed by the Philadelphia Athletics ball club but instead stayed in Harrisburg to play pro baseball due to his promotion at the steel mill. He later was involved in the insurance business and owned a cigar store.

== Career ==
Taylor served on the Harrisburg School Board and on the Harrisburg City Council in 1907. He became involved with Theodore Roosevelt's Progressive Party which cost him reelection to the city council in 1915. He served as Dauphin County Recorder of Deeds in 1919 and Chief County Clerk in 1925. He rejoined the city council and served for three consecutive terms.

In 1931, he took over control of the Dauphin County Republican Organization after the death of his mentor, Edward E. Beidelman. Taylor became GOP state committee chair in 1934. He left the position in 1936 for a failed run as the Commonwealth's secretary for internal affairs. He returned to the position of GOP state committee chair in 1942 and served until 1954.

He served as Pennsylvania State Senator for the 15th district from 1941 to 1964 including as President Pro Tempore from 1945 to 1964. His major legislative achievements include construction of the M. Harvey Taylor Memorial Bridge, the Pennsylvania State Capitol Complex, the State Archives and Museum, the development of Fort Indiantown Gap, the present Governor's mansion and the Zembo Mosque in 1929.

For 33 years, he was the undisputed political boss of Dauphin County. He was involved in the selection of every Republican gubernatorial candidate from 1933 to 1964. He personally selected committee chairmen, scheduled legislation and ran patronage. He redirected $30 million over his 16 years as President Pro Tempore to Dauphin County. He supported favored interests including the Pennsylvania Railroad and the Sun Oil Company.

== Personal life ==
In 1897, he married Bertha May Shertzer. He died on May 16, 1982, at the age of 105 and is interred at Paxtang Cemetery in Paxtang, Pennsylvania.

In 1932, Taylor served as Illustrious Potentate of Zembo Shriners, an affiliate of Shriners International.

== Legacy ==
The M. Harvey Taylor Memorial Bridge which spans the Susquehanna River in Harrisburg, Pennsylvania, was named in his honor.

== See also ==
- List of Pennsylvania state legislatures
