= American Record Guide =

Classical music magazine

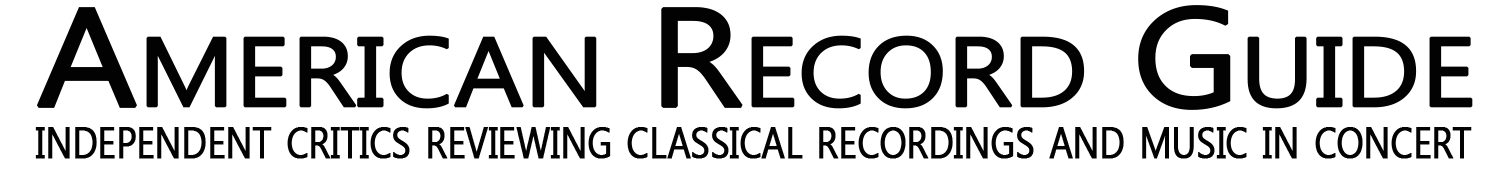
- Editor: Donald Vroon
- Categories: Music magazine
- Frequency: Bimonthly
- Founder: Peter Hugh Reed
- Founded: 1935
- Company: Record Guide Publications
- Country: United States
- Based in: Cincinnati, Ohio
- Language: English
- Website: www.americanrecordguide.com
- ISSN: 0003-0716

The American Record Guide (ARG) is a classical music magazine. It has reviewed classical music recordings since 1935.

== History and profile ==
The magazine was founded by Peter Hugh Reed in May 1935 as the American Music Lover. It changed names to the American Record Guide in 1944. Reed was its editor and publisher until 1957.

Since 1992, with the incorporation of the Musical America editorial functions into ARG, it started covering concerts, musicians, ensembles and orchestras in the US.

In addition to new music releases, many issues in past years contained an overview of the recordings of a single composer's works. Most current issues do not feature these overviews. For overviews, there is an index included in every issue detailing which issue contains these overviews.

The editor, Donald Vroon, had been an NPR classical radio broadcaster and record reviewer in Buffalo, New York in the 1980s.

== See also ==
- Phonograph Monthly Review
