= John S. Rice =

American politician (1899–1985)

John Rice
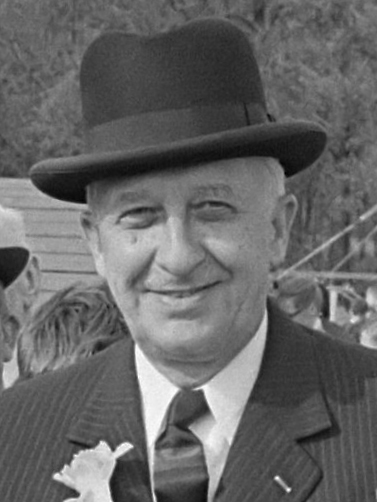
- Rice in 1964

50th United States Ambassador to the Netherlands
- In office May 6, 1961 – May 27, 1964
- President: John F. Kennedy; Lyndon Johnson
- Preceded by: Philip Young
- Succeeded by: William Tyler

Chair of the Pennsylvania Democratic Party
- In office September 17, 1965 – June 21, 1966
- Preceded by: Otis Morse
- Succeeded by: Thomas Z. Minehart
- In office July 23, 1959 – May 6, 1961
- Preceded by: Joe Barr
- Succeeded by: Otis Morse

Secretary of the Commonwealth of Pennsylvania
- In office June 10, 1958 – May 6, 1961
- Governor: George Leader; David Lawrence
- Preceded by: James Finnegan
- Succeeded by: James Trimarchi, Jr.

Pennsylvania Secretary of the Department of Property and Supplies
- In office December 31, 1955 – July 18, 1957
- Governor: George Leader
- Preceded by: William Thomas
- Succeeded by: Kenneth Haldeman

Member of the Pennsylvania Liquor Control Board
- In office February 8, 1955 – December 31, 1955
- Appointed by: George Leader
- Preceded by: New Appointment
- Succeeded by: A.D. Cohn

President pro tempore of the Pennsylvania Senate
- In office January 3, 1939 – November 30, 1940
- Preceded by: Harvey Huffman^{[a]}
- Succeeded by: Frederick Gelder

Democratic Leader of the Pennsylvania Senate
- In office April 14, 1937 – November 30, 1938
- Preceded by: Warren Roberts
- Succeeded by: John Dent

Member of the Pennsylvania Senate from the 33rd district
- In office January 3, 1933 – November 30, 1940
- Preceded by: Charles Clippinger
- Succeeded by: Paul Crider

Personal details
- Born: January 28, 1899 Brysonia, Pennsylvania, U.S.
- Died: August 2, 1985 (aged 86) Fort Lauderdale, Florida, U.S.
- Party: Democratic
- Spouse: Luene Rogers Rice
- Children: Ellen Rice
- Education: Gettysburg College
- Occupation: Politician, farmer, businessman
- a.Huffman died on the day his term was set to expire, November 30, 1938. Rice immediately succeeded him as Acting President Pro Tempore until he was formally elected to the position when the Senate reconvened the following January.

John Stanley Rice (January 28, 1899 – August 2, 1985) was an American Democratic politician, farmer and businessman from the Commonwealth of Pennsylvania. Rice served in a variety of appointed and elected political roles over the course of a three-decade political career.

== Background ==
A native of Brysonia, a small town several miles north of Gettysburg, Rice graduated from Gettysburg College. He became a successful apple grower, and went on to manufacture packaged apple products. He often returned to this business between political appointments. Rice was a Lutheran.

== Political career ==
Rice was elected to the Pennsylvania State Senate in 1932. He was elected Democratic floor leader in 1937, following the resignation of Warren Roberts, who took office as State Auditor General. He was elected the Senate's President pro tempore in 1939.

In 1946, he was the Democratic nominee for governor, but lost to Republican State Attorney General James Duff.

== Gubernatorial appointments ==
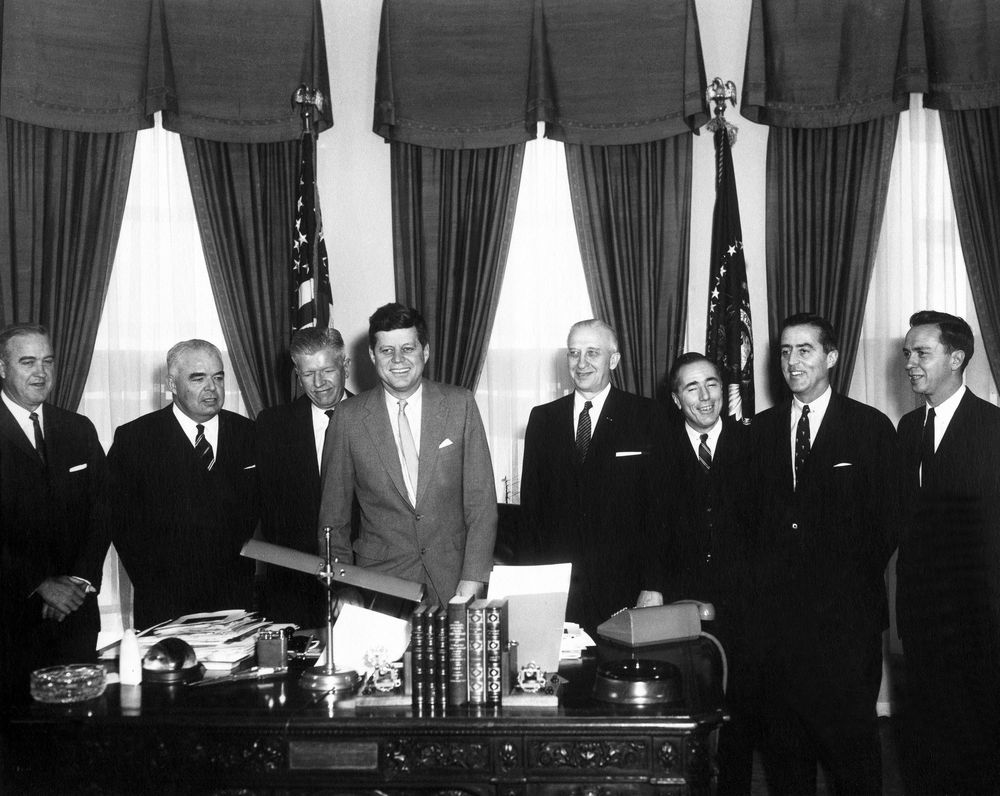
Rice (fourth from right) with President Kennedy and other ambassadors in March 1961

In 1955, Governor George Leader named Rice to the first round of appointments to the overhauled Pennsylvania Liquor Control Board. He resigned from the board later that year, when Leader appointed him Secretary of the Department of Property and Supplies (now the Department of General Services).

After resigning from the cabinet in 1957, he returned to his apple farm and packaging business. However, in 1958, Leader again appointed Rice to a position in his cabinet, having him succeed the deceased James Finnegan as Secretary of the Commonwealth. Rice was also elected chair of the State Democratic Party in 1959.

In 1961, Rice received his final political appointment, when President Kennedy named him U.S. Ambassador to the Netherlands. He stepped-down from the position three years later. He returned to his former position of state party chair in 1965 following the resignation of Otis Morse. He did not seek reelection in 1966.

== Death and legacy ==
Rice died in Fort Lauderdale in August 1985.

Rice Hall, on the campus of Gettysburg College, is named in his honor. He had served as a trustee of the college from 1939 until 1972, when he retired to Fort Lauderdale.

Diplomatic posts
Preceded by Philip Young	United States Ambassador to the Netherlands; 1961–1964	Succeeded by William Tyler
Political offices
Preceded by James Finnegan	Secretary of the Commonwealth of Pennsylvania; 1958–1961	Succeeded by James Trimarchi, Jr.
Preceded by William Thomas	Pennsylvania Secretary of the Department of Property and Supplies; 1955–1957	Succeeded by William Thomas
Preceded by New Appointment	Member of the Pennsylvania Liquor Control Board; 1955	Succeeded by A.D. Cohn
Preceded by Harvey Huffman	President pro tempore^{1} of the Pennsylvania Senate; 1939–1940	Succeeded by Frederick Gelder
Pennsylvania State Senate
Preceded by Charles Clippinger	Member of the Pennsylvania Senate for the 33rd District; 1933–1940	Succeeded by Paul Crider
Party political offices
Preceded by Joe Barr	Chairman of the Pennsylvania Democratic Party; 1959–1961	Succeeded by Otis Morse
Preceded by Warren Roberts	Democratic Leader of the Pennsylvania Senate; 1937–1938	Succeeded by John Dent
Preceded by Clair Ross	Democratic nominee for Governor of Pennsylvania; 1946	Succeeded by Richardson Dilworth
Notes and references
1. Acting President from 1938–1939
