= Ten Mile, Pennsylvania =

Unincorporated community in Pennsylvania, U.S.

Coordinates: 40°01′14″N 80°09′23″W

Ten Mile is an unincorporated community in Washington County, Pennsylvania, United States. Ten Mile is located in Amwell Township, at an elevation of 929 ft (283 m).

== History ==
Variant names were "Ten Mile Village" and "Tenmile". A post office called Ten Mile was established in 1838, the name was changed to Tenmile in 1895, and the post office closed in 1955. The community was named after nearby Tenmile Creek.
