= Edward Martin (Pennsylvania politician) =

American politician (1879–1967)

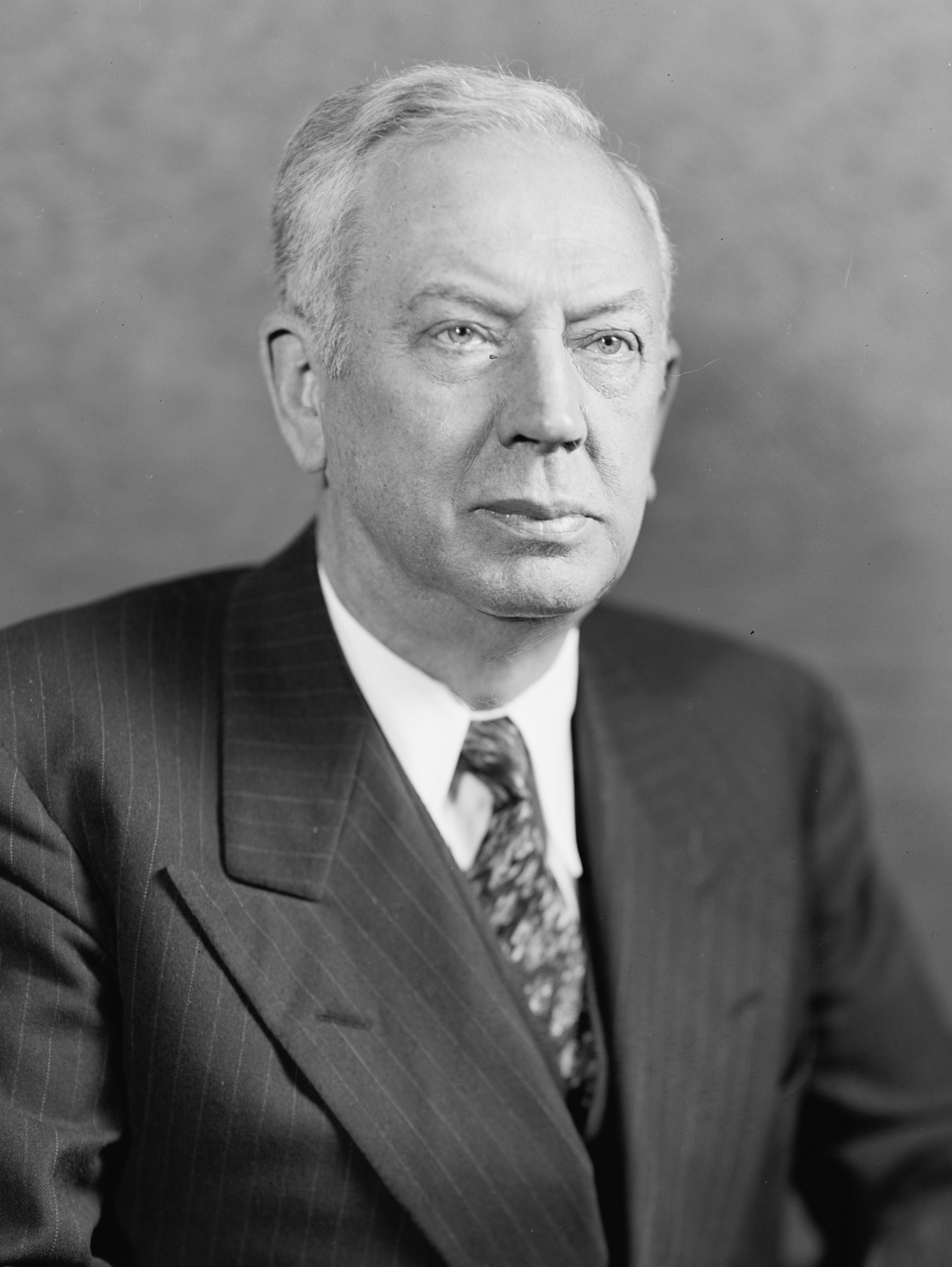
- Martin, 1905–1945

United States Senator from Pennsylvania
- In office January 3, 1947 – January 3, 1959
- Preceded by: Joseph F. Guffey
- Succeeded by: Hugh Scott

Chair of the National Governors Association
- In office July 1, 1945 – May 26, 1946
- Preceded by: Herbert B. Maw
- Succeeded by: Millard Caldwell

32nd Governor of Pennsylvania
- In office January 19, 1943 – January 2, 1947
- Lieutenant: John C. Bell Jr.
- Preceded by: Arthur James
- Succeeded by: John C. Bell Jr.

58th Treasurer of Pennsylvania
- In office January 15, 1929 – January 17, 1933
- Governor: John Stuchell Fisher; Gifford Pinchot
- Preceded by: Charles A. Snyder
- Succeeded by: Samuel S. Lewis

Chair of the Pennsylvania Republican Party
- In office May 12, 1928 – June 9, 1934
- Preceded by: William Larimer Mellon Sr.
- Succeeded by: M. Harvey Taylor

31st Auditor General of Pennsylvania
- In office January 20, 1925 – January 15, 1929
- Governor: Gifford Pinchot; John Stuchell Fisher
- Preceded by: Samuel S. Lewis
- Succeeded by: Charles A. Waters

Personal details
- Born: September 18, 1879 Ten Mile, Pennsylvania, U.S.
- Died: March 19, 1967 (aged 87) Washington, Pennsylvania, U.S.
- Party: Republican
- Spouse: Mary Scott (1909–1967)
- Children: 2, Edward Scott and Mary Charity
- Education: Waynesburg University (BA)

Military service
- Allegiance: United States
- Branch/service: United States Army: Pennsylvania Army National Guard
- Years of service: 1898–1942
- Rank: Major general
- Commands: 109th Infantry Regiment; 110th Infantry Regiment; 55th Infantry Brigade; 28th Infantry Division
- Battles/wars: Spanish–American War; Border War; World War I World War II

Edward Martin (September 18, 1879 – March 19, 1967) was an American lawyer, military officer and Republican party politician from Waynesburg, Pennsylvania. He served as the 32nd governor of Pennsylvania from 1943 until 1947 and as a United States senator from Pennsylvania from 1947 until 1959.

== Biography ==
=== Early life and military service ===
Edward Martin was born in Ten Mile, Pennsylvania, on September 18, 1879, attending public schools in his youth. He served with Pennsylvania volunteers during the Spanish–American War from May 11, 1898, to August 22, 1899, and reached the rank of sergeant. He studied law and graduated from Waynesburg College in Waynesburg, Pennsylvania, in 1901. He served as physical director and football coach at Waynesburg in 1909.

Martin enlisted in the Pennsylvania National Guard after the Spanish-American War at his former rank of sergeant, and later became an officer. He was promoted to first lieutenant on January 15, 1900, to captain on July 11, 1905, and to major on July 6, 1910. The Pennsylvania National Guard was mobilized for the Mexican Border Expedition in 1916, and Martin was on active duty from June 22 to October 27, 1916. When the United States entered World War I, Martin went on active duty again on July 15, 1917. During the war, Martin commanded the 109th Infantry Regiment from September 6–9, 1918 (being promoted to the temporary rank of lieutenant colonel on September 9) and the 110th Infantry Regiment from September 7 to October 14, 1918. For valor and wounds received in combat, Martin earned a Distinguished Service Cross and a Purple Heart, both with oak leaf clusters. He left active duty after the Armistice, on April 25, 1919.

On July 29, 1920, Martin was promoted to colonel in the Pennsylvania National Guard, and became the first post-war commander of the 110th Infantry Regiment, 28th Division, a position he held from that date until August 17, 1922. On December 15, 1922, Martin was promoted to brigadier general and assumed command of the 55th Infantry Brigade, 28th Division. On June 26, 1939, he became a major general and commander of the 28th Division. After the United States entered World War II, Major General Martin was retired on April 1, 1942, because of Army regulations concerning over-age officers.

Martin was also president of the National Guard Association of the United States in 1940.

=== Career in law and politics ===
Martin was admitted to the bar in 1905 and commenced practice in Waynesburg. He was a burgess of East Waynesburg from 1902 to 1905, solicitor of Greene County from 1908 to 1910 and again from 1916 to 1920. He served as auditor general of Pennsylvania from 1925 to 1929 and State treasurer from 1929 to 1933. He chaired the Pennsylvania Republican Party from 1928 to 1934. He was adjutant general of Pennsylvania from 1939 to 1943. He had varied business interests, including fire insurance, oil and gas, and banking.

Martin was elected Governor of Pennsylvania in 1942. He served as president of the Council of State Governments in 1946 and was elected as a Republican to the United States Senate in the same year. In 1947, Martin received the American Legion's Distinguished Service Medal. Martin was re-elected to the Senate in 1952. During the 83rd Congress from 1953 to 1955, when the Republicans were in the majority, he was chairman of the Senate Public Works Committee. Martin voted in favor of the Civil Rights Act of 1957. Martin did not seek re-nomination to a third term in 1958. He died in Washington, Pennsylvania in 1967 and is buried at Greene Mount Cemetery in Waynesburg.

=== Fort Indiantown Gap ===
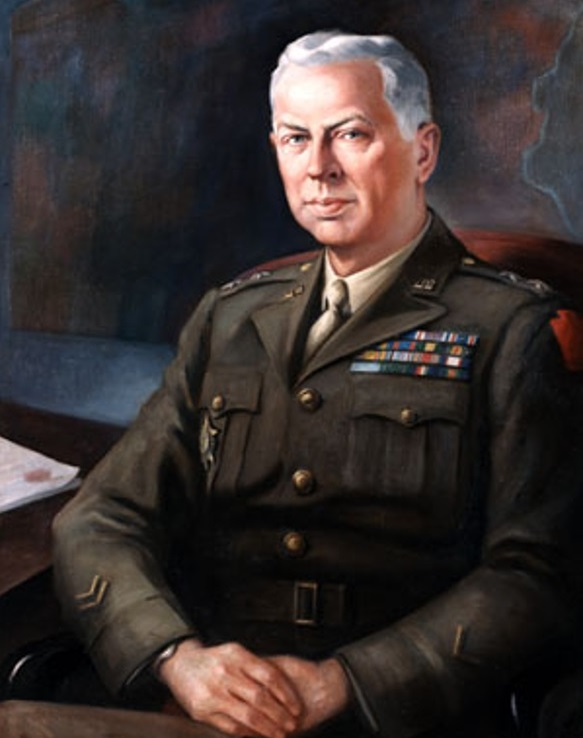
Pennsylvania State Capitol portrait of Martin as a major general commanding the 28th Infantry Division

Martin was prominent in the development of Fort Indiantown Gap and after his death, the United States Senate renamed the facility the Edward Martin Military Reservation, an honor that Martin himself had rejected throughout his life. The new name was never fully accepted by the military personnel who served there. In 1975, the Secretary of the Army renamed the post Fort Indiantown Gap in order to more closely align it with the other active duty stations throughout the United States. The Joint Force Headquarters of the Pennsylvania National Guard is located at Fort Indiantown Gap, and is named Edward Martin Hall in Martin's honor.

=== Edward Martin Memorial Library at NGAUS ===
The Library at the National Guard Association of the United States (NGAUS) is dedicated to Martin and is named the Edward Martin Memorial Library. While not a circulating library, it serves as one of the foremost collections of National Guard documents and is ideal for researchers. Original volumes include a complete collection of NGAUS Conference minutes dating to 1879 and Adjutant General (TAG) Reports dating to the early 20th Century. The Library may be found in the National Guard Memorial Building, One Massachusetts Ave., NW, Washington DC 20001. The Edward Martin Memorial Library is managed and maintained by the National Guard Educational Foundation (NGEF).

== See also ==
- List of members of the American Legion

Political offices
Preceded by Samuel S. Lewis	Auditor General of Pennsylvania; 1925–1929	Succeeded by Charles A. Waters
Preceded by Charles Snyder	Treasurer of Pennsylvania; 1929–1933	Succeeded by Sam Lewis
Preceded by Arthur James	Governor of Pennsylvania; 1943–1947	Succeeded by John C. Bell Jr.
Preceded by Herbert B. Maw	Chair of the National Governors Association; 1945–1946	Succeeded by Millard F. Caldwell
Party political offices
Preceded by Samuel S. Lewis	Republican nominee for Treasurer of Pennsylvania; 1928	Succeeded by Charles A. Waters
Preceded by William Larimer Mellon Sr.	Chair of the Pennsylvania Republican Party; 1928–1934	Succeeded by M. Harvey Taylor
Preceded by Arthur James	Republican nominee for Governor of Pennsylvania; 1942	Succeeded by James H. Duff
Preceded by Jay Cooke	Republican nominee for U.S. Senator from Pennsylvania (Class 1); 1946, 1952	Succeeded by Hugh Scott
Military offices
Previous: Edward C. Shannon	Commanding General 28th Infantry Division; 1939–1942	Succeeded by James Garesche Ord
U.S. Senate
Preceded by Joseph F. Guffey	United States Senator (Class 1) from Pennsylvania; 1947–1959; Served alongside: Francis J. Myers, James H. Duff, Joseph S. Clark Jr.	Succeeded by Hugh Scott
Preceded by Dennis Chávez	Chair of the Senate Public Work Committee; 1953–1955	Succeeded by Dennis Chávez
