= James H. Duff =

American lawyer and politician (1883–1969)

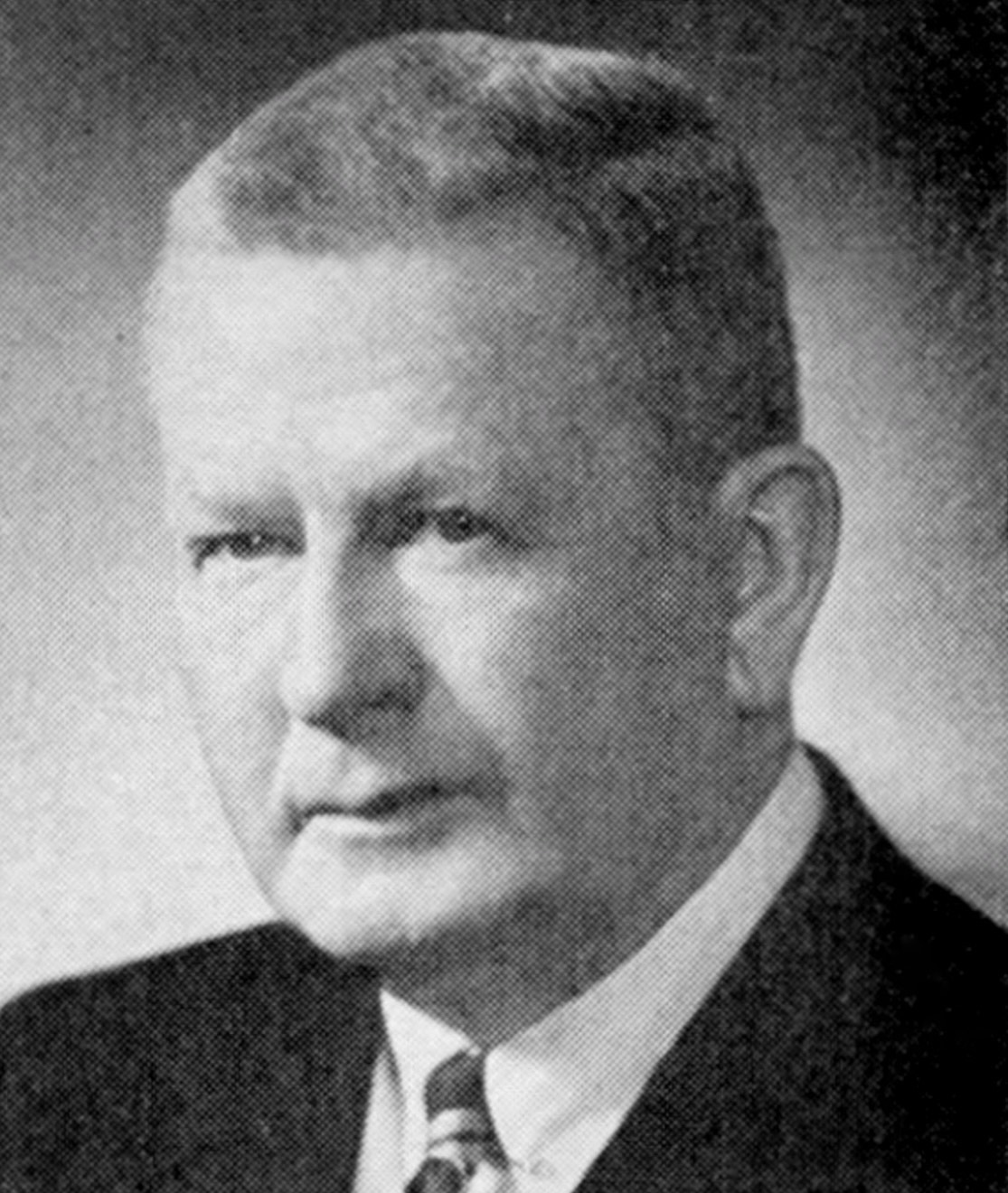
- Duff, c. 1953

United States Senator from Pennsylvania
- In office January 3, 1951 – January 3, 1957
- Preceded by: Francis J. Myers
- Succeeded by: Joseph S. Clark

34th Governor of Pennsylvania
- In office January 21, 1947 – January 16, 1951
- Lieutenant: Daniel B. Strickler
- Preceded by: John C. Bell, Jr.
- Succeeded by: John S. Fine

Attorney General of Pennsylvania
- In office January 19, 1943 – January 21, 1947
- Governor: Edward Martin; John C. Bell, Jr.
- Preceded by: E. Russell Shockley
- Succeeded by: T. McKeen Chidsey

Personal details
- Born: James Henderson Duff; January 21, 1883 Carnegie, Pennsylvania, U.S.
- Died: December 20, 1969 (aged 86) Washington, D.C., U.S.
- Party: Republican
- Spouse: Jean Kerr Taylor (m. 1909)
- Children: 1 son (that died by infancy)
- Education: Princeton University (AB); University of Pittsburgh (LLB)
- Profession: Attorney, Politician

James Henderson Duff (January 21, 1883 – December 20, 1969) was an American lawyer and politician. A member of the Republican Party, he served as Attorney General of Pennsylvania from 1943 to 1947. He was the 34th governor of Pennsylvania from 1947 to 1951. He served as United States Senator from Pennsylvania from 1951 to 1957.

== Early life and education ==
James Duff was born in Mansfield (now Carnegie), a suburb of Pittsburgh, Pennsylvania. The oldest of four children, he was the son of Rev. Joseph Miller and Margaret (née Morgan) Duff. His father was a Presbyterian minister for forty years, and his paternal grandfather was the first college-educated doctor in western Pennsylvania. Two of his great-grandfathers were members of the Provincial Council of Pennsylvania between 1683 and 1717.

After graduating at the top of his class at Carnegie High School, Duff attended Princeton University in New Jersey, where he received a Bachelor of Arts degree in 1904. Originally he had intended to study medicine but, after winning two medals in public speaking at Princeton, decided to study law instead. He attended the University of Pennsylvania Law School in Philadelphia until 1906, when he transferred to the University of Pittsburgh Law School to be closer to home. In 1907, he received his law degree and was admitted to the bar. He married Jean Kerr Taylor in 1909; the couple had only one child who died in infancy, but they raised a nephew after the boy's father died.

== Early career ==
Duff practiced law in Pittsburgh for thirty-six years, establishing the law firm of Duff, Scott and Smith. He also served as solicitor of Carnegie, and was an elector for Theodore Roosevelt in the 1912 presidential election. In addition to practicing law, Duff was engaged in the oil business for several years. He began by buying an oil driller's rig and taking a lease on some property about five miles from his home, where he struck oil. He subsequently engaged in ventures in other parts of western Pennsylvania as well as Mexico. He also served as president of the Criterion Oil Company and of the Westmoreland Natural Gas Company. He lost his fortune in the 1929 stock market crash, taking several years to recover financially. He was a delegate to the Republican National Convention in 1932, 1936, and 1940.

== Political career ==
Duff was appointed Attorney General of Pennsylvania by Governor Edward Martin in 1943, serving in that position until 1947. During his tenure, he worked to strengthen the state's stream pollution law despite facing strong opposition from the coal industry. He also fought against the mining industry after promoting legislation to prevent the discharge of mine silt into the Schuylkill River. The Desilting Act and Clean Streams Act (also known as the Brunner Act) were passed in 1945 under Duff's tenure as Attorney General.

In 1946, John Bell, who had been elected Lieutenant Governor in 1942 and had ascended to the governorship following Martin's resignation for the US senate, declined to be a candidate in the upcoming 1946 gubernatorial election. Duff subsequently won the Republican nomination, and was elected the 34th Governor of Pennsylvania in the general election. His campaign focused on the issues of conservation, public health, and education. He handily defeated his Democratic opponent, former President pro tempore of the State Senate John Rice, by more than 557,000 votes.

Duff was elected to the United States Senate from Pennsylvania in 1950, narrowly unseating Democratic Senator Francis J. Myers. After losing the 1956 election to Democrat Joe Clark in one of the closest elections in Pennsylvania history, Duff retired from politics, but remained in Washington, D.C., as a partner in the law firm of Davies, Richberg, Tydings, Landa & Duff. He died in Washington, D.C., and was buried in Carnegie, Pennsylvania.

U.S. Senate
| Preceded by Francis Myers | U.S. senator (Class 3) from Pennsylvania; 1951–1957; Served alongside: Edward Martin | Succeeded by Joe Clark |
Political offices
| Preceded by John Bell | Governor of Pennsylvania; 1947–1951 | Succeeded by John Fine |
Legal offices
| Preceded by E. Russell Shockley | Attorney General of Pennsylvania; 1943–1947 | Succeeded by T. McKeen Chidsey |
Party political offices
| Preceded by Edward Martin | Republican nominee for Governor of Pennsylvania; 1946 | Succeeded by John Fine |
| Preceded by James Davis | Republican nominee for U.S. Senator from Pennsylvania (Class 3); 1950, 1956 | Succeeded by James Van Zandt |
