= Aichele =

Aichele is a German surname. Notable people with the surname include:

- Carol Aichele (born 1950), American politician
- Erwin Aichele (1887–1974), German painter
- Hans Aichele (1911–1948), Swiss bobsledder
- Stephen S. Aichele (born 1948), American lawyer and politician
- Wolfram Aichele (1924–2016), German artist
