= Pedro Cortés =

Puerto Rican politician

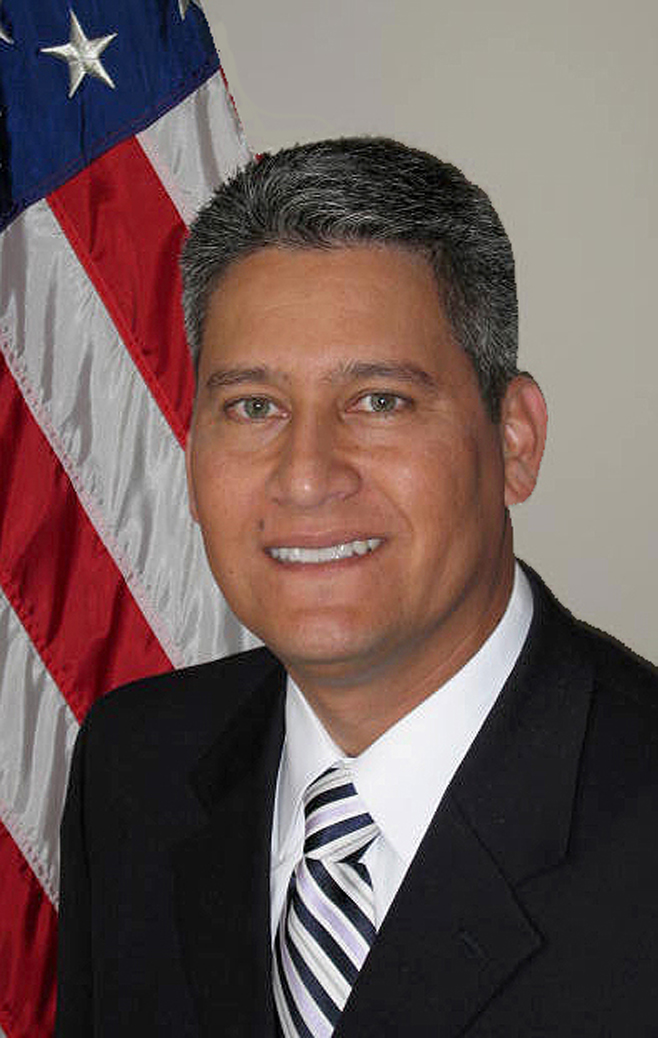

Secretary of the Commonwealth of Pennsylvania
- In office January 20, 2015 – October 11, 2017
- Governor: Tom Wolf
- Preceded by: Carol Aichele
- Succeeded by: Robert Torres (Acting)
- In office April 2, 2003 – June 10, 2010
- Governor: Ed Rendell
- Preceded by: Michael Weaver
- Succeeded by: Basil Merenda

Personal details
- Born: May 28, 1966 (age 60) Carolina, Puerto Rico
- Party: Democratic
- Spouse: Lissette Lizardi
- Children: 1
- Education: University of Massachusetts Amherst (BS); Pennsylvania State University, Harrisburg (MPA); Dickinson School of Law (JD)

Pedro A. Cortés (born May 28, 1966) is an American government official. He served twice in the role of Secretary of the Commonwealth of Pennsylvania, originally from 2003 to 2010 until Governor Ed Rendell and later from 2015 to 2017 under Governor Tom Wolf.

Cortés was the first Latino confirmed to a position in the state cabinet, and holds the distinction of being the longest-serving Secretary of the Commonwealth in Pennsylvania history. Additionally, Cortés was the first Puerto Rican to serve in a state secretary of state role outside of Puerto Rico.

In 2017, Cortés resigned following reports of a glitch that allowed ineligible immigrants to register to vote when applying for or renewing drivers licenses.

== Education and training ==
Cortés earned his Bachelor of Science in Hotel, Restaurant and Travel Administration from the University of Massachusetts Amherst, a Master of Public Administration from Penn State Harrisburg, and a Juris Doctor from Penn State Dickinson Law. He also holds a certificate in Public Sector Human Resources Management from Penn State Harrisburg and Doctorate Degrees honoris causa from King's College, Harcum College and Widener University School of Law.

In 2004, Cortés was one of 40 state leaders from across the country selected to participate in the Toll Fellowship Program sponsored by The Council of State Governments. His peers elected him 2004 Class Representative.

== Voter registration glitch and resignation ==
Philadelphia City Commissioner Al Schmidt announced in September 2017 that his staff discovered 317 non-citizens who contacted City Commissioners to cancel their voter registrations since 2006, the year reliable statistics from the Statewide Uniform Registry of Electors began. Of the 317 ineligible registrations, 220 who responded to Schmidt's Office were registered to vote from the time the records began in 2006 until 2017 when the registrations were canceled, of whom 41% had recorded at least one vote in that period, and 51% of those who voted, cast ballots in more than one election. Schmidt believes the requests for cancelation were due to questions asked during process of applying for Citizenship of the United States as to if the applicants were previously or currently registered to vote, though at this point in the application process, the lawful permanent resident would be ineligible to be registered.

The ineligible registrations primarily originated from PennDOT when lawful permanent residents had obtained or renewed drivers licenses from electronic kiosks that allowed them to register to vote. The National Voter Registration Act of 1993 requires states to offer voter registration to eligible persons when applying for or renewing a drivers license. The glitch in question had been in place through several administrations, prior to Cortés taking office. One month prior to the 2016 U.S. Presidential Election, Cortés responded in a Pennsylvania House State Government Committee hearing that non-citizens may "inadvertently register" through PennDOT.

After reports from other election officials, the Pennsylvania Department of State indicated 1,160 canceled ineligible registrations since 1972 were under review due to non-citizenship. A week after State Rep. Daryl Metcalfe, chairman of the House State Government Committee sent a letter to the Secretary of the Commonwealth's office expressing "dire concerns", Cortés tendered his resignation.

== Public service ==
A lawyer by training, Cortés was the Senior Advisor for Latino Affairs to two Pennsylvania Governors. As the Executive Director of the Governor's Advisory Commission on Latino Affairs, he made recommendations to the Governors and their administrations on policies, procedures and legislation that enhanced the status of the Latino community in Pennsylvania. As the Governor's liaison to the Latino community, he ensured that state government was accessible, accountable and responsive to the needs of Latinos and that strategies and programs were developed to enhance the community's social and economic status. Secretary Cortés’ professional pursuits have also included work with the State Civil Service Commission and the Pennsylvania Department of Public Welfare.

For years Cortés has participated in numerous community and government-related organizations, including the National Association of Secretaries of State (NASS). NASS is the oldest national nonpartisan professional organization of public officials in the United States. From July 2008 to July 2009, Secretary Cortés fulfilled the role of NASS President, making him the first Pennsylvania Secretary of State to enjoy that distinction in the organization’s 104-year history. Under his leadership, the association strengthened cooperative relationships between the states and actively engaged the White House, Congress and federal agencies. During the same period, NASS developed effective public policies in the areas of elections administration, voter participation, business services, securities, international relations and state heritage.

In December 2009 Cortés was elected Chair of the Pennsylvania Interbranch Commission for Gender, Racial and Ethnic Fairness. Formed in 2005 at the recommendation of the Pennsylvania Supreme Court with the concurrence of the governor and legislative leaders, the Commission's purpose is to ensure that people of every race, gender and ethnic background are treated fairly and respectfully throughout all offices of state government.

Cortés was nominated Pennsylvania Secretary of State by Governor Tom Wolf on January 20, 2015 and confirmed by the Senate on June 2, 2015. He previously served as Secretary of the Commonwealth from 2003 to 2010. At that time Cortés was the first confirmed Latino Cabinet member and longest serving Secretary of State in Pennsylvania history.

== Personal life ==
A native of Carolina, Puerto Rico, Cortés has lived in Harrisburg, Pennsylvania since 1990. He is married to Lissette Lizardi-Cortés and they have a daughter, Gabriela.

He has received honorary doctorates from King's College, Harcum College, and Widener University School of Law.

Political offices
Preceded by Michael Weaver	Secretary of the Commonwealth of Pennsylvania; 2003–2010	Succeeded by Basil Merenda
Preceded by Carol Aichele	Secretary of the Commonwealth of Pennsylvania; 2015–2017	Succeeded by Robert Torres; Acting
