= Stephen S. Aichele =

American lawyer (born 1948)

Chief of Staff for the Governor of Pennsylvania
- In office May 29, 2012 – 2015
- Governor: Tom Corbett

General Counsel of Pennsylvania
- In office January 18, 2011 – May 29, 2012

Personal details
- Born: July 4, 1948 (age 78) Philadelphia, Pennsylvania, U.S.
- Spouse: Carol Aichele
- Education: Cornell University; Temple University School of Law

Stephen S. Aichele (born July 2, 1948) is an American lawyer and was a member of the cabinet of former Pennsylvania governor Tom Corbett.

Aichele was graduated in 1970 with a B.A. from Cornell University and in 1977 at Temple University School of Law. He became General Counsel of Pennsylvania on January 18, 2011. He held that post until he became Corbett's Chief of Staff on May 29, 2012 following the resignation of William Ward.

His wife Carol was also a member of Corbett's cabinet, serving as Secretary of the Commonwealth of Pennsylvania.

Government offices
Preceded by Barbara Adams	General Counsel of Pennsylvania; 2011–2012	Succeeded by Jim Schultz
Preceded by William Ward	Chief of Staff for the Governor of Pennsylvania; 2012–2015	Succeeded by Kathleen McGinty
