= Leigh M. Chapman =

American politician, attorney and activist

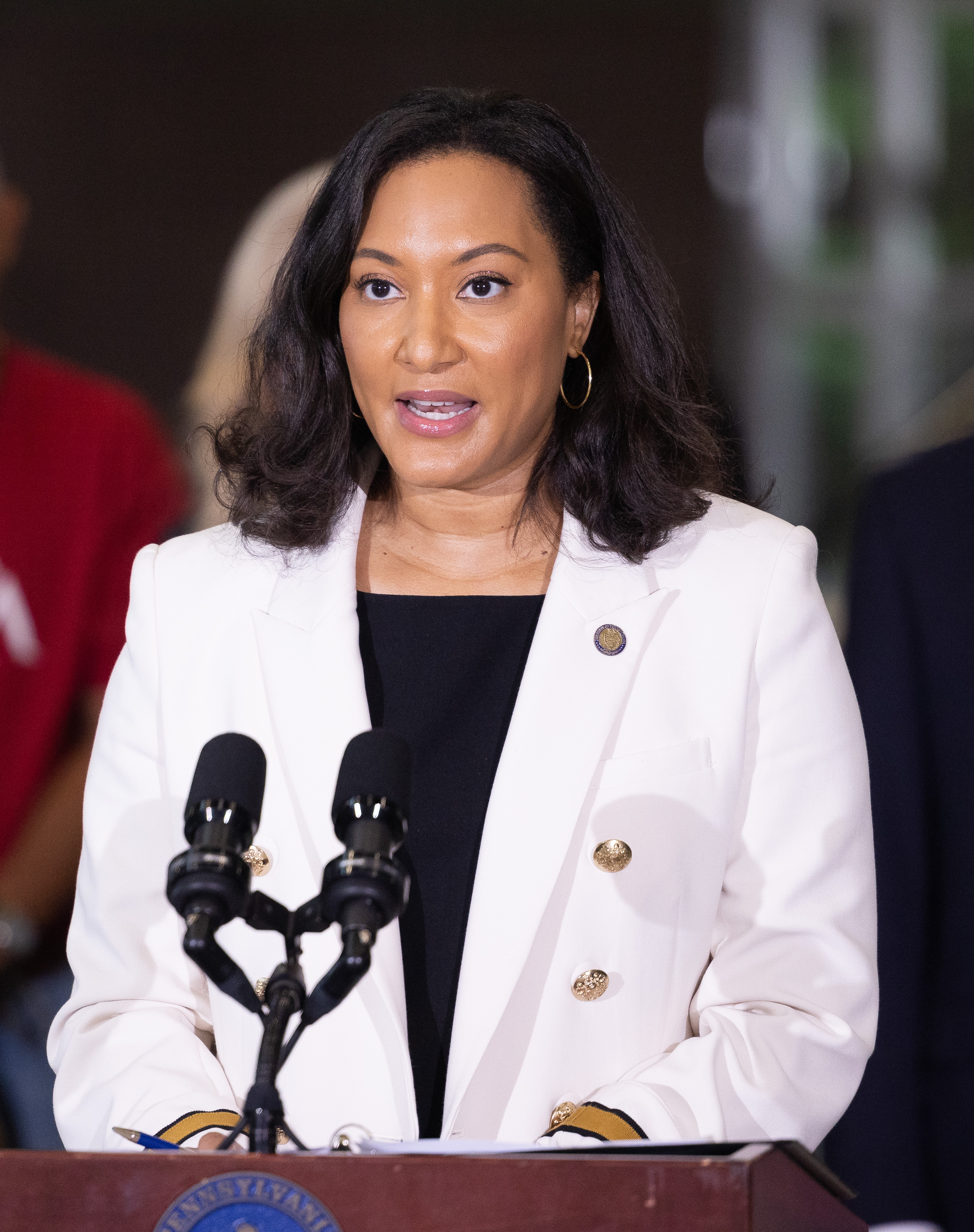
- Chapman in 2022

Acting Secretary of the Commonwealth of Pennsylvania
- In office January 8, 2022 – January 17, 2023
- Governor: Tom Wolf
- Preceded by: Veronica Degraffenreid (Acting)
- Succeeded by: Al Schmidt

Personal details
- Born: c. 1984
- Education: University of Virginia (B.A.); Howard University (J.D.)

Leigh M. Chapman (born c. 1984) is an American voting rights activist and former government official who served as acting secretary of the Commonwealth of Pennsylvania from 2022 to 2023.

== Career ==
Chapman has a bachelor of arts degree in American studies and history from the University of Virginia and a juris doctor degree from the Howard University School of Law, where she was a member of the Human Rights & Globalization Law Review and the Civil Rights Clinic.

Chapman has held high-ranking positions within several voting rights and voter advocacy organizations, including Let America Vote and the Leadership Conference on Civil and Human Rights. She has advocated for same-day voter registration, early voting, automatic voter registration, and no-excuse absentee voting. From 2015 to 2017, Chapman served as policy director for the Pennsylvania Department of State, overseeing the implementation of electronic voter registration in the state. In December 2021, Chapman was chosen by Governor Tom Wolf to serve as the acting secretary of the Commonwealth of Pennsylvania, following the reassignment of Acting Secretary Veronica Degraffenreid. At the time, Chapman was executive director of Deliver My Vote, a mail-in voting advocacy group. She took office on January 8, 2022. Chapman was the fifth person to hold the office of secretary of the commonwealth under Governor Wolf. Her appointment came at a time when her predecessors were targeted by members of the Pennsylvania General Assembly pushing false claims of voter fraud in the 2020 United States presidential election. Chapman faced similar attacks following the 2022 midterm elections after she announced it would be "days" before the final vote count would be released due to the large volume of ballots cast by different methods. After the conclusion of the Wolf administration, Chapman joined Open Society Foundations.

Political offices
Preceded by Veronica Degraffenreid; Acting	Secretary of the Commonwealth of Pennsylvania; Acting; 2022–2023	Succeeded by Al Schmidt
