= Kathy Boockvar =

American lawyer, politician (born 1968)

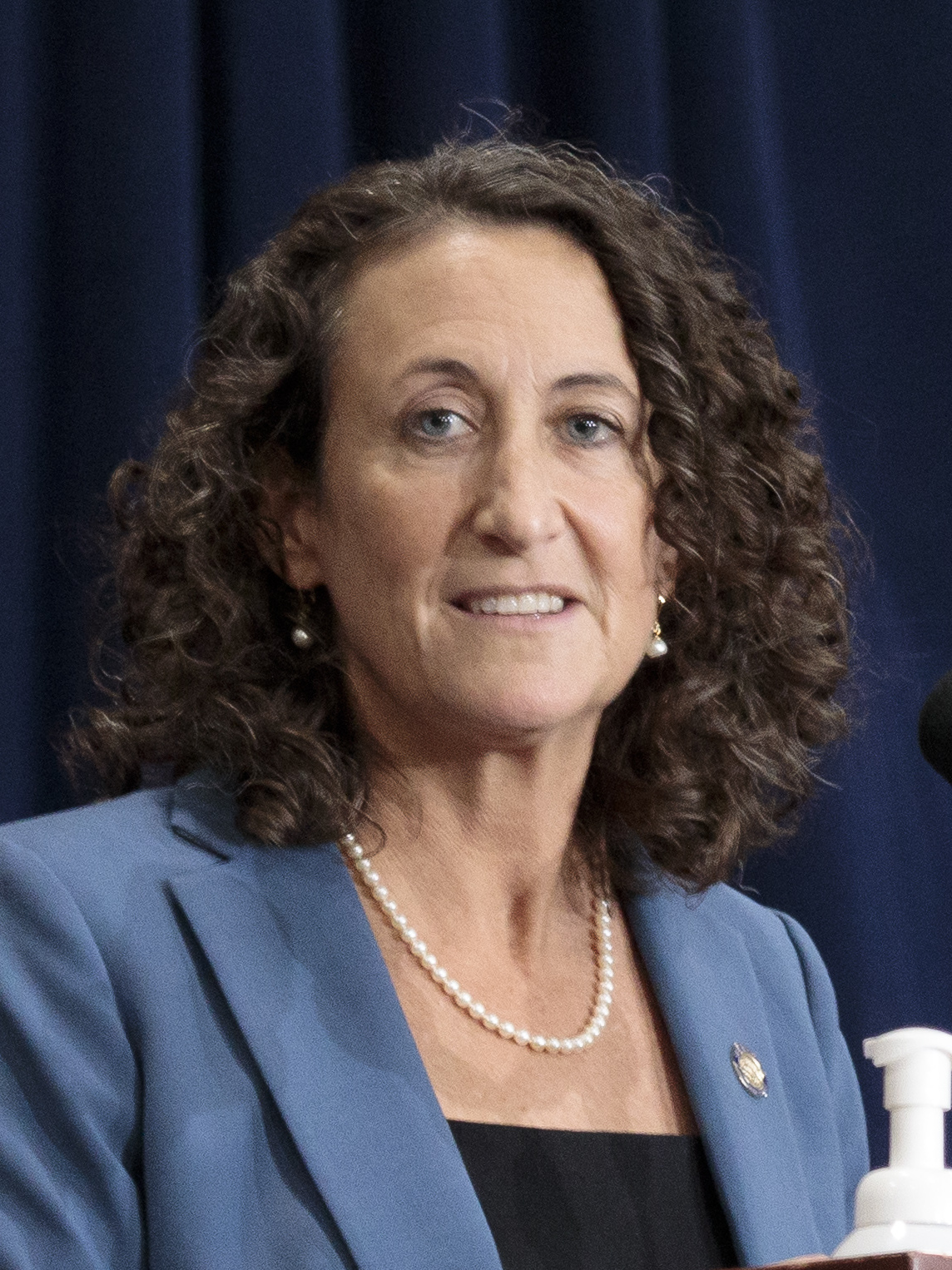

Secretary of the Commonwealth of Pennsylvania
- In office January 5, 2019 – February 5, 2021: Acting: January 5, 2019 – November 19, 2019
- Governor: Tom Wolf
- Preceded by: Robert Torres (acting)
- Succeeded by: Veronica Degraffenreid (acting)

Personal details
- Born: Kathryn Boockvar; October 23, 1968 (age 57) New York City, New York, U.S.
- Party: Democratic
- Spouse: Jordan Yeager
- Education: University of Pennsylvania (BA); American University (JD)

Kathryn Boockvar (/ˈbʊkvɑːr/, born October 23, 1968) is an American attorney and politician who served as the secretary of the Commonwealth of Pennsylvania from January 5, 2019 to February 5, 2021. She was appointed to the position by Governor Tom Wolf. Boockvar has previously served as Senior Advisor to the Governor on Election Modernization, beginning in March 2018. In August 2019, she was named co-chair of the Elections Committee of the National Association of Secretaries of State.

Boockvar previously served as chief counsel at the Pennsylvania auditor general, on the board of commissioners of the Delaware River Port Authority, and as executive director of Lifecycle WomanCare, a birth center in suburban Philadelphia. She has worked as a poll worker and voting-rights attorney in Pennsylvania.

== Early life and education ==
Born on Staten Island, Boockvar was raised in Hewlett Neck, New York, where she attended Hewlett High School. Boockvar earned her Bachelor of Arts degree from the University of Pennsylvania in 1990 and graduated as a Juris Doctor from the Washington College of Law at American University in 1993.

== Professional career ==
After completing both the New York and Pennsylvania bar exams, Boockvar began her career at Northern Pennsylvania Legal Services, an organization that provides legal services for people with low incomes and domestic violence survivors. After four years with the organization, she began work as an attorney for Lehigh Valley Legal Services representing low-income clients in cases of unemployment compensation, family law, disability, protection from abuse, bankruptcy, elder law and other issues. In 1997, she was Managing Partner of Boockvar & Yeager along with her husband and litigated cases before the U.S. Court of Appeals and U.S. District Courts as well as Pennsylvania courts related to employment, social security, pensions and insurance.

From 2008 to 2011, Boockvar worked for Advancement Project, a non-profit organization focused on voting rights in Pennsylvania. During her tenure, she worked on voter rights education campaigns across the state.

In 2023, Boockvar joined the University of Pittsburgh as a visiting scholar and adjunct professor in the university’s School of Law. She will work in the university's Institute for Cyber Law, Policy and Security and focus her work on election security, disinformation and other issues at the intersection of democracy and technology.

In October 2023, Boockvar announced the launch of her political consulting firm, Athena Strategies. The firm works with organizations to advocate for election security and advise on election policy and legislation.

== Political career ==
Boockvar ran unsuccessfully for the Commonwealth Court of Pennsylvania in 2011.

She ran unopposed in the Democratic primary for the 8th congressional district in the 2012 election for the U.S. House, losing to incumbent Michael G. Fitzpatrick.

In March 2018, Boockvar was named Senior Adviser to the Governor on Election Modernization in the Pennsylvania Department of State by Governor Tom Wolf.

=== Secretary of the Commonwealth of Pennsylvania ===
She was appointed acting secretary of the Commonwealth on January 5, 2019 and confirmed by the Senate on November 19, 2019. In August 2019, she was named co-chair of the Elections Committee of the National Association of Secretaries of State.

==== Resignation ====
On February 5, 2021, Boockvar resigned from her position after a departmental oversight occurred in which the Pennsylvania Department of State did not properly advertise to voters the proposal of a constitutional amendment for a retroactive window for victims of child sexual abuse to sue offenders. The process was begun to restore proper course of action, and the Pennsylvania Department of State will resume the process of publicizing the proposed amendment to be eligible for the ballot in 2023. All other amendments passed during the 2019–20 legislative session were properly advertised. Boockvar took responsibility for the department's oversight, sharing her opinion that accountability is a cornerstone of public service. Veronica Degraffenreid succeeded her as acting Secretary of the Commonwealth.

== Electoral history ==
Judge of the Commonwealth Court of Pennsylvania, 2011: Democratic primary
Party	Candidate	Votes	%
Democratic	Kathryn Boockvar	311,732	50.2
Democratic	Barbara Behrend Ernsberger	309,680	49.8

Judge of the Commonwealth Court of Pennsylvania, 2011
Party	Candidate	Votes	%
Republican	Anne Covey	978,634	52.4
Democratic	Kathryn Boockvar	890,701	47.6

Democratic primary results
Party	Candidate	Votes	%
Democratic	Kathy Boockvar	25,595	100.0
Total votes		25,595	100.0

Pennsylvania's 8th Congressional District 2012
Party	Candidate	Votes	%
Republican	Michael G. Fitzpatrick (Incumbent)	199,379	56.6
Democratic	Kathryn Boockvar	152,859	43.4
Total votes		352,238	100
Republican hold			

== Personal life ==
Boockvar resides with her husband, Judge Jordan Yeager, in Doylestown, Pennsylvania.

Her brother, John Boockvar, is a neurosurgeon who was featured in the Netflix documentary series Lenox Hill.

Political offices
Preceded by Robert Torres; Acting	Secretary of the Commonwealth of Pennsylvania; 2019–2021	Succeeded by Veronica Degraffenreid; Acting
