= Barbara Adams =

Barbara Adams may refer to:

- Barbara Adams (attorney) (born 1951), American attorney
- Barbara Adams (Egyptologist) (1945–2002), British Egyptologist
- Barbara Adams (politician) (born 1962), member of the Progressive Conservative Association of Nova Scotia, Canada

== See also ==
- Barbara Adam (born 1945), British sociologist
