= Veronica Degraffenreid =

American election official

Secretary of the Commonwealth of Pennsylvania
- Acting
- In office February 5, 2021 – January 8, 2022
- Governor: Tom Wolf
- Preceded by: Kathy Boockvar
- Succeeded by: Leigh M. Chapman (Acting)

Personal details
- Born: Bertie County, North Carolina, United States
- Political party: Democratic
- Education: University of North Carolina, Chapel Hill (BA)

Veronica Degraffenreid is an American election official serving as the special advisor on election modernization in the Pennsylvania Department of State. After it was announced that Commonwealth Secretary Kathy Boockvar would resign from her position on February 5, 2021, Degraffenreid was announced as her successor.

She has been cited by news reporters and other researchers as an expert on election modernization and voting technology.

== Formative years ==
Born in Bertie County, North Carolina, Degraffenreid earned a Bachelor of Arts degree in economics from the University of North Carolina at Chapel Hill.

== Legal and government career ==
From April 1988 to July 2000, Degraffenreid worked as a litigation specialist at Poyner Spruill LLP. She was then hired as a litigation specialist by the North Carolina Department of Justice. During her roughly ten years of work in those two positions, she focused on redistricting and election-related litigation.

She was then appointed as director of election operations for the North Carolina State Board of Elections in March 2008. During her roughly twelve-year tenure, she rose to national prominence as an expert and advisor regarding election modernization and voting technology.

Degraffenreid subsequently became an advisor to the Geo-Enabled Elections project of the National States Geographic Information Council in 2018 and presented a workshop at the Elections GeoSummit in Washington, D.C., in 2019 regarding the use of spatial data audits as part of election-related GIS-technology.

In February 2020, she began work as a special advisor to the Pennsylvania Department of State. During her first year on the job, she provided guidance to county elections personnel regarding methods of election modernization and to county elections personnel and their respective voters regarding safe voting procedures during the early days of the COVID-19 pandemic.

On February 8, 2021, she was appointed as Acting Secretary of State of the Commonwealth of Pennsylvania by Pennsylvania Governor Tom Wolf. On March 26, 2021, she was officially nominated by Wolf for the position of Secretary of State. Wolf noted that Degraffenreid "has extensive experience in operating elections from security and poll worker training to voter registration, voting site administration and modern voting systems." While still Acting Secretary of State, she was appointed by Wolf as a special advisor in January 2022 and then promoted to deputy chief of staff.

In November 2022, Degraffenreid was hired by the Brennan Center for Justice at the New York University School of Law as senior manager of strategic partnerships, elections and government. She also currently serves on the Committee for Safe and Secure Elections, and is based in Washington, D.C.

== Written works ==
- Degraffenreid, Veronica. "Honor, protect Black election officials," in The Philadelphia Inquirer, May 14, 2023.

Political offices
Preceded by Kathy Boockvar	Secretary of the Commonwealth of Pennsylvania; Acting; 2021–2022	Succeeded by Leigh M. Chapman; Acting
