= Robert Torres (administrator) =

American politician

Secretary of Aging of Pennsylvania
- In office January 4, 2019 – January 17, 2023; Acting: January 4, 2019 – June 4, 2019
- Governor: Tom Wolf
- Preceded by: Teresa Osborne
- Succeeded by: Jason Kavulich

Acting Secretary of the Commonwealth of Pennsylvania
- In office October 11, 2017 – January 5, 2019
- Governor: Tom Wolf
- Preceded by: Pedro Cortés
- Succeeded by: Kathy Boockvar

Personal details
- Political party: Democratic
- Children: 2
- Education: Pace University (BA); Widener University (JD)

Robert Torres served as the secretary of the Pennsylvania Department of Aging from 2019 until 2023, appointed by Governor Tom Wolf in January 2019. Prior to his appointment, he served as acting secretary of the Department of State.

== Education ==
Torres received his Bachelor of Business Administration from Pace University and his J.D. from Widener University School of Law.

== Career ==
Torres has worked in multiple positions in the Pennsylvania state government, including as deputy secretary for administration in the Pennsylvania Department of Health, and as Pennsylvania's Health Information Technology Coordinator.

Torres also previously worked at General Dynamics Information Technology, providing program management and business development services, and served as vice president of Health Information Technology at Capital Blue Cross.

Political offices
Preceded by Pedro Cortés	Secretary of the Commonwealth of Pennsylvania; Acting; 2017–2019	Succeeded by Kathy Boockvar; Acting
