= John Michael Hall =

American politician

John Michael Hall was the Secretary of the Pennsylvania Department of Aging. He was appointed by Governor Ed Rendell in 2008 and confirmed in 2009. He left office in 2011 when Rendell's term ended.
