= Pennsylvania Office of General Counsel =

Pennsylvania Governor's Office of General Counsel

Agency overview
- Jurisdiction: Commonwealth of Pennsylvania
- Headquarters: Harrisburg, Pennsylvania
- Employees: 500+ attorneys
- Agency executive: Jennifer C. Selber, General Counsel
- Website: www.ogc.pa.gov

Pennsylvania Governor's Office of General Counsel is an executive-level agency in Pennsylvania providing legal services to all executive agencies, boards, and commissions and select independent agencies of the Government of Pennsylvania. It is governed by the Commonwealth Attorneys Act of 1980.

== List of Appointed General Counsel ==
The following list of attorneys have served in the role of General Counsel since its inception:

- Jay C. Waldman, appointed Jan. 27, 1981
- Henry G. Barr, appointed Apr. 7, 1986
- Morey M. Myers, appointed Jan. 20, 1987
- James J. Haggerty, appointed Sept. 11, 1989
- Richard D. Spiegelman, appointed June 16, 1993
- Paul A. Tufano, appointed Jan. 17, 1995
- James M. Sheehan, appointed Nov. 8, 1999
- Leslie Anne Miller, appointed Jan. 21, 2003
- Barbara Adams, appointed June 1, 2005
- Stephen S. Aichele, appointed Jan. 18, 2011
- James D. Schultz, appointed July 23, 2012
- Jarad W. Handelman, appointed Nov. 7, 2014
- Denise J. Smyler, appointed Jan. 20, 2015
- Gregory G. Schwab, appointed Oct. 19, 2019
- Jennifer C. Selber (incumbent), appointed Jan. 17, 2023

== See also ==
- List of Pennsylvania state agencies
