= Brenda K. Mitchell =

American politician

Secretary of the Commonwealth of Pennsylvania
- In office 1992–1994
- Governor: Bob Casey Sr.
- Preceded by: Christopher A. Lewis
- Succeeded by: Robert N. Grant

Personal details
- Born: 1942 or 1943 (age 83–84)
- Party: Democratic
- Education: Fordham University (BA); Hunter College (MA); Nova Southeastern University (DPA)

Brenda K. Mitchell is an American politician who served as Secretary of the Commonwealth of Pennsylvania from 1992 to 1994.

== Early life and education ==
Mitchell was raised in New York City. She earned her undergraduate degree at Fordham University, a master's degree in urban affairs from Hunter College, and a doctorate in public administration from Nova University.

== Career ==
In 1987, Mitchell was appointed deputy secretary of economic policy under the Department of Commerce. In 1990, she became special assistant to governor Bob Casey Sr. Mitchell was sworn in as secretary of the commonwealth on May 6, 1992, and resigned on May 1, 1994.

Mitchell is among the founders of Richard Allen Preparatory Charter School in Philadelphia. She is the current president and CEO of Management and Environmental Technologies, Inc.

== Personal life ==
Mitchell has one son, Corrie.

Political offices
Preceded by Christopher A. Lewis	Secretary of the Commonwealth of Pennsylvania; 1992–1994	Succeeded by Robert N. Grant
