= Sophia O'Hara =

American politician from Pennsylvania (1882-1954)

Secretary of the Commonwealth of Pennsylvania
- In office January 17, 1939 – January 19, 1943
- Governor: Arthur James
- Preceded by: David L. Lawrence
- Succeeded by: Charles M. Morrison

Secretary of the Pennsylvania Department of Human Services
- In office January 19, 1943 – January 2, 1947
- Governor: Edward Martin

Personal details
- Born: November 13, 1882 Wilkes-Barre, Pennsylvania, U.S.
- Died: April 26, 1954 (aged 71) Wilkes-Barre, Pennsylvania, U.S.
- Party: Republican

Sophia O'Hara (November 13, 1882 – April 26, 1954) was an American politician who served as the first female Secretary of the Commonwealth of Pennsylvania as a member of the Republican party from January 17, 1939, to January 19, 1943.

== Early life ==
O'Hara was born on November 13, 1882, in Wilkes-Barre, Pennsylvania to Patrick J. O'Hara and was of Irish descent. She became a lawyer and a member of the Luzerne county bar, having been admitted to practice in state and federal courts.

== Political career ==
O'Hara was first appointed as deputy Attorney General of Pennsylvania under Governor John Stuchell Fisher in 1927, and served in that position until 1935. She was also the president of the Pennsylvania Republican Council of Women from 1929 to 1934, before becoming vice chairman of the Republican State Committee from 1934 to 1938. She was also an alternate delegate to the Republican National Convention from Pennsylvania in 1928 and 1936.

Following the election of Arthur James as Governor, O'Hara was appointed Secretary of the Commonwealth of Pennsylvania on January 17, 1939. At the end of her term on January 19, 1943, O'Hara was appointed by newly elected Governor Edward Martin as Secretary of the Pennsylvania Department of Human Services. At the end of her tenure in 1947, O'Hara was named to the Parole Board by Governor James H. Duff. After 22 years of serving her state across multiple governorships, O'Hara decided to retire from state service at the end of her Parole Board term on May 1, 1953.

== Death ==
O'Hara was admitted to Mercy Hospital in Wilkes-Barre, Pennsylvania on April 18, 1954. She died there on April 26, aged 71, and was buried in Saint Mary's Cemetery in Hanover Township. O'hara never married and had no children.

Political offices
Preceded by David L. Lawrence	Secretary of the Commonwealth of Pennsylvania; 1939-1943	Succeeded by Charles M. Morrison
