= William F. Ward =

American lawyer (born 1951)

William F. Ward (born November 20, 1951, in Brooklyn, New York) is an American lawyer.

Ward graduated in 1977 at Temple University School of Law. He was Pennsylvania governor Tom Corbett's first Chief of Staff from January 2011 until May 2012, when he stepped down. He previously held a post as judge at the Allegheny County Court of Common Pleas. He is currently an attorney and partner at Rothman Gordon P.C. in Pittsburgh, Pennsylvania, and currently practices Alternative Dispute Resolution, Commercial and Business Litigation, and White Collar Criminal Defense.

Government offices
Preceded by Steve Crawford	Chief of Staff for the Governor of Pennsylvania; 2011–2012	Succeeded by Stephen S. Aichele
