= Christopher A. Lewis =

American politician

Secretary of the Commonwealth of Pennsylvania
- In office 1989–1991
- Governor: Bob Casey Sr.
- Preceded by: James J. Haggerty
- Succeeded by: Brenda K. Mitchell

Personal details
- Party: Democratic

Christopher A. Lewis is an American politician and law school instructor. He served as the Secretary of the Commonwealth of Pennsylvania in the administration of Bob Casey Sr. from 1989 to 1991.

== Early life and education ==
Lewis graduated from the Harvard College (BA) and University of Michigan Law School (JD). He is currently a professor at University of Pennsylvania Law School.

Political offices
Preceded by James J. Haggerty	Secretary of the Commonwealth of Pennsylvania; 1989–1991	Succeeded by Brenda K. Mitchell
