= Clyde L. King =

American academic and government official (1879–1937)

Pennsylvania Secretary of Revenue
- In office 1931–1933
- Governor: Gifford Pinchot
- Preceded by: Charles Johnson
- Succeeded by: Leon D. Metzger

Secretary of the Commonwealth of Pennsylvania
- In office 1923–1926
- Governor: Gifford Pinchot
- Preceded by: Bernard J. Myers
- Succeeded by: E. H. Conarroe

Personal details
- Born: May 1, 1879 Burlington, Kansas, U.S.
- Died: June 21, 1937 (aged 58) Westtown Township, Pennsylvania, U.S.
- Party: Republican
- Education: Kansas State Normal School; University of Michigan; University of Pennsylvania

Clyde Lyndon King (May 1, 1879 – June 21, 1937) was an American academic and government official who was Secretary of State and Finance of Pennsylvania from 1923 to 1926 and Pennsylvania Secretary of Revenue from 1931 to 1932.

== Early life ==
King was born on May 1, 1879 in Burlington, Kansas. He taught in Mound City, Kansas for three years, then attended Kansas State Normal School, graduating in 1904. He earned his bachelor's and master of arts degrees from the University of Michigan.

== Academia ==
King was an American history instructor at Kansas Normal College in the summer of 1907, then held the Peter White fellowship in American history at Michigan from 1907 to 1908. From 1908 to 1910, King was a professor of economics and sociology at the University of Pennsylvania. He then served as an acting professor at the University of Colorado. In 1911, he earned his doctor of philosophy from Penn and was awarded the Harrison Fellowship. In 1920, he became a professor of political science at the Wharton School. He remained a member of the Penn faculty for the remainder of his life.

King was also a prolific writer, authoring History of the Government of Denver, Regulation of Municipal Utilities, and Study of the Trolley Freight Service and Philadelphia Markets. He was an assistant editor of The Annals of the American Academy of Political and Social Science and an associate editor of National Municipal Review. In 1914, he was promoted to editor of The Annals, a position he held until 1929.

== Government service ==
During World War I, King worked for the United States Food Administration and spent two years as a member of the Tri-State Milk Commission. President Warren G. Harding appointed King to the Agricultural Conference of 1921 and the Unemployment Conference of 1922.

In 1922, King chaired the Pinchot citizens' committee, which investigate the financial affairs of the commonwealth on behalf of gubernatorial candidate Gifford Pinchot. In 1923, King was appointed secretary of state and finance by Pinchot. He resigned in 1926 to return to the University of Pennsylvania, but remained an advisor to the Governor and directed an industrial survey of the Central and Western Pennsylvania coal counties.

When Pinchot returned to the Governor's office in 1931, King was appointed secretary of revenue. In 1932, he was appointed chairman of the Public Service Commission. On behalf of Pinchot, King fought to remove S. Ray Shelby and Samuel Walker from the commission. When testifing before a legislative committee investigating the commission, King exonerated Shelby and Walker. As a result, Pinchot removed King from the PSC. King challenged his removal in court, but was unsuccessful.

In May 1933, King became chief of the milk section of the Agricultural Adjustment Administration. He was heavily criticized by farmers and consumers for being too friendly to milk distributors and resigned in January 1934.

King died of a heart attack on June 21, 1937 at his home in Westtown Township, Pennsylvania.
