= Kim Pizzingrilli =

American politician

Secretary of the Commonwealth of Pennsylvania
- In office 1998–2002
- Preceded by: Yvette Kane
- Succeeded by: C. Michael Weaver

Kim Pizzingrilli was a member of the Pennsylvania Public Utility Commission and a former Secretary of the Commonwealth of Pennsylvania.

== Career ==
Pizzingrilli worked for the Treasurer of Pennsylvania's office and the Independent Regulatory Review Commission prior to serving as the Secretary of the Commonwealth of Pennsylvania. During her tenure as Secretary of the Commonwealth, she frequently spoke to groups of high school students regarding the elections process and the importance of voting. She was nominated by Pennsylvania Governors Tom Ridge, Mark Schweiker and Ed Rendell to serve as a commissioner on the Pennsylvania Public Utility Commission. She was subsequently confirmed by the Pennsylvania State Senate.

Following her departure from public service, Pizzingrilli became a member of Buchanan Ingersoll & Rooney's Government Relations and Public Policy section, for which she chaired the State Government Relations Practice Group. She also served as the co-chair of the Firm's Energy Industry team.
