= 2009 Philadelphia municipal election =

2009 Pennsylvania local election

2009 Philadelphia elections
- November 3, 2009

A general election was held in Philadelphia, Pennsylvania on November 3, 2009, to elect various county and city-level positions. The primary election was held on May 19, 2009.

== District Attorney ==
2009 Philadelphia district attorney election
- November 3, 2009
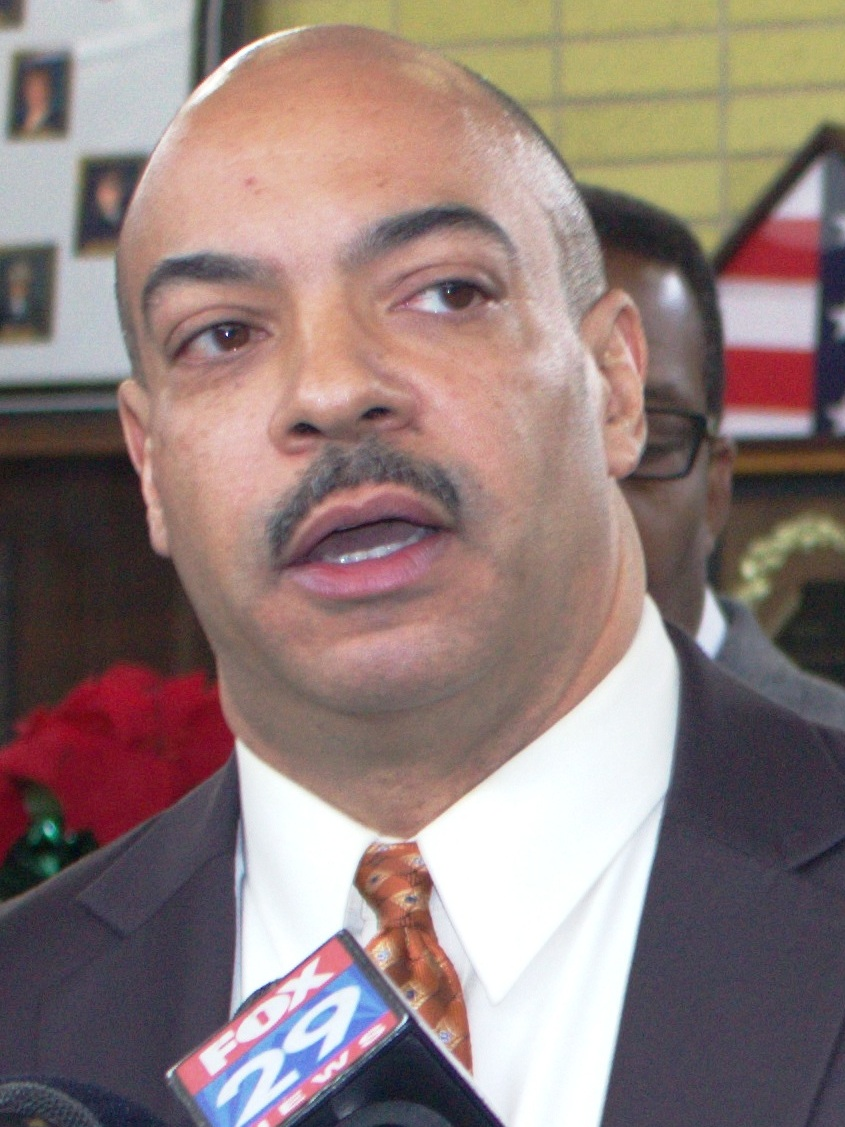

Candidate	Seth Williams	Michael Untermeyer
Party	Democratic	Republican
Popular vote	91,495	30,355
Percentage	75.07%	24.91%
- Williams: 50–60% 60–70% 70–80% 80–90% >90% Untermeyer: 50–60% 60–70% 70–80% 80–90% Tie: 50%
District Attorney before election
Lynne Abraham
Democratic
Elected District Attorney
Seth Williams
Democratic

Incumbent district attorney Lynne Abraham retired after four terms in office. Seth Williams, a former assistant district attorney who narrowly lost to Abraham in the 2005 Democratic primary, became the first African American elected to the office.

=== Democratic primary ===
==== Nominee ====
- Seth Williams, former assistant district attorney and Philadelphia Inspector General

==== Eliminated in primary ====
- Brian Grady
- Daniel McCaffery, lawyer and former assistant district attorney
- Daniel McElhatton, lawyer and former Philadelphia City Councilmember (1992–1996)
- Michael Turner

==== Results ====
Results by ward Williams: 30%–40%; 40%–50%; 50%–60%; 60%–70%; 70%–80%; McCaffery: 30%–40%; 40%–50%; 50%–60%; 60%–70%; 70%–80%

Democratic primary results
Party	Candidate	Votes	%
Democratic	Seth Williams	43,302	41.77
Democratic	Daniel McCaffery	31,249	30.14
Democratic	Daniel McElhatton	15,224	14.69
Democratic	Michael Turner	9,168	8.84
Democratic	Brian Grady	4,711	4.54
Write-in		10	0.01
Total votes		103,664	100.00

=== Republican primary ===
==== Nominee ====
- Michael Untermeyer

==== Results ====
Republican primary results
Party	Candidate	Votes	%
Republican	Michael Untermeyer	8,371	99.70
Write-in		25	0.30
Total votes		8,396	100.00

=== General election ===
==== Results ====
2009 Philadelphia District Attorney election
Party	Candidate	Votes	%
Democratic	Seth Williams	91,495	75.07
Republican	Michael Untermeyer	30,355	24.91
Write-in		29	0.02
Total votes		121,879	100.00
Democratic hold			

== City Controller ==
2009 Philadelphia city controller election
- November 3, 2009

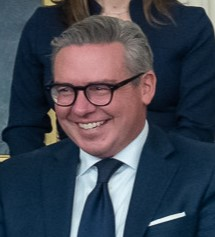
Candidate	Alan Butkovitz	Al Schmidt
Party	Democratic	Republican
Popular vote	83,673	32,379
Percentage	72.08%	27.89%
- Butkovitz: 50–60% 60–70% 70–80% 80–90% >90% Schmidt: 50–60% 60–70% 70–80% 80–90% Tie: 50%
City Controller before election
Alan Butkovitz
Democratic
Elected City Controller
Alan Butkovitz
Democratic

Incumbent City Controller Alan Butkovitz won reelection to a second term in a landslide.

=== Democratic primary ===
==== Nominee ====
- Alan Butkovitz, incumbent city controller (2006–present)

==== Eliminated in primary ====
- John Braxton
- Brett Mandel, non-profit executive and Democratic committeeperson

==== Results ====
Results by ward Butkovitz: 30%–40%; 40%–50%; 50%–60%; 60%–70%; Braxton: 30%–40%; 40%–50%; 50%–60%; 60%–70%; Mandel: 40%–50%; 50%–60%; 60%–70%

Democratic primary results
Party	Candidate	Votes	%
Democratic	Alan Butkovitz (incumbent)	36,190	41.71
Democratic	John L. Braxton	26,439	30.47
Democratic	Brett Mandel	24,097	27.77
Write-in		41	0.05
Total votes		86,767	100.00

=== Republican primary ===
==== Nominee ====
- Al Schmidt, executive director of the Philadelphia Republican City Committee

==== Results ====
Republican primary results
Party	Candidate	Votes	%
Republican	Al Schmidt	8,820	99.85
Write-in		13	0.15
Total votes		8,833	100.00

=== General election ===
2009 Philadelphia City Controller election
Party	Candidate	Votes	%
Democratic	Alan Butkovitz (incumbent)	83,673	72.08
Republican	Al Schmidt	32,379	27.89
Write-in		30	0.03
Total votes		116,082	100.00
Democratic hold			

== Court of Common Pleas partisan election ==
=== Democratic primary ===
==== Results ====
Democratic primary results (vote for up to 7)
Party	Candidate	Votes	%
Democratic	Robert Coleman	45,235	10.32
Democratic	Angeles Roca (Note: Cross-filed for the Republican nomination.)	38,410	8.76
Democratic	Diane Thompson	30,326	6.92
Democratic	Donna Woelpper	29,443	6.72
Democratic	Dan Anders	28,859	6.58
Democratic	Adam Beloff	26,167	5.97
Democratic	Roxanne Covington	25,820	5.89
Democratic	Sharon Williams Losier	25,612	5.84
Democratic	Beverly Muldrow	24,790	5.65
Democratic	Joyce Eubanks	24,059	5.49
Democratic	Fran Shields	23,193	5.29
Democratic	Angelo J. Foglietta	18,508	4.22
Democratic	Gregory A. Coleman	14,916	3.40
Democratic	Elinore O'Neill Kolodner	13,941	3.18
Democratic	Jonathan Q. Irvine	12,935	2.95
Democratic	W. Fred Harrison Jr.	10,307	2.35
Democratic	Marilyn Rigmaiden-DeLeon	9,821	2.24
Democratic	Vince Giusini	8,929	2.04
Democratic	John Joseph Capaldi	8,429	1.92
Democratic	Anne Marie Coyle	6,945	1.58
Democratic	Christine Adair	5,883	1.34
Democratic	Judge Hall	5,601	1.28
Democratic	Thomas Martin	138	0.03
Democratic	Kenneth J. Powell Jr.	62	0.01
Democratic	Dawn M. Tancredi	43	0.01
Write-in		18	0.00
Total votes		438,390	100.00

=== Republican primary ===
==== Results ====
Republican primary results (vote for up to 7)
Party	Candidate	Votes	%
Republican	Anne Marie Coyle (Note: Cross-filed for the Democratic nomination.)	7,540	20.06
Republican	Fran Shields	6,770	18.02
Republican	Angeles Roca	5,926	15.77
Republican	Joyce Eubanks	5,631	14.98
Republican	Dan Rendine	5,591	14.88
Republican	Dan Anders	5,546	14.76
Republican	Kenneth J. Powell Jr.	525	1.40
Write-in		48	0.13
Total votes		37,579	100.00

=== General election ===
==== Results ====
2009 Philadelphia Court of Common Pleas election (vote for up to 7)
Party	Candidate	Votes	%
Democratic	Robert Coleman	79,607	12.20
Republican	Robert Coleman	18,941	2.90
Total	Robert Coleman	98,548	15.11
Democratic	Diane Thompson	78,184	11.99
Republican	Diane Thompson	19,043	2.92
Total	Diane Thompson	97,227	14.90
Democratic	Angeles Roca	75,886	11.63
Republican	Angeles Roca	18,704	2.87
Total	Angeles Roca	94,590	14.50
Democratic	Donna Woelpper	75,350	11.55
Republican	Donna Woelpper	18,795	2.88
Total	Donna Woelpper	94,145	14.43
Democratic	Dan Anders	75,683	11.60
Republican	Dan Anders	18,456	2.83
Total	Dan Anders	94,139	14.43
Democratic	Adam Beloff	74,710	11.45
Republican	Adam Beloff	18,810	2.88
Total	Adam Beloff	93,520	14.34
Democratic	Roxanne Covington	80,072	12.27
Write-in		102	0.02
Total votes		652,343	100.00

== Court of Common Pleas retention elections ==
Justice Byrd retention, 2009
Choice	Votes	%
For	49,668	75.79
Against	15,865	24.21
Total	65,533	100.00
Source: Philadelphia City Commissioners

Justice Chen retention, 2009
Choice	Votes	%
For	46,881	75.32
Against	15,365	24.68
Total	62,246	100.00
Source: Philadelphia City Commissioners

Justice Dembe retention, 2009
Choice	Votes	%
For	43,800	74.39
Against	15,079	25.61
Total	58,879	100.00
Source: Philadelphia City Commissioners

Justice Gordon retention, 2009
Choice	Votes	%
For	47,745	75.73
Against	15,300	24.27
Total	63,045	100.00
Source: Philadelphia City Commissioners

Justice Hill retention, 2009
Choice	Votes	%
For	42,754	72.99
Against	15,819	27.01
Total	58,573	100.00
Source: Philadelphia City Commissioners

Justice Lerner retention, 2009
Choice	Votes	%
For	42,721	74.38
Against	14,719	25.62
Total	57,440	100.00
Source: Philadelphia City Commissioners

Justice Rizzo retention, 2009
Choice	Votes	%
For	48,844	75.23
Against	16,078	24.77
Total	64,922	100.00
Source: Philadelphia City Commissioners

Justice Shreeves Johns retention, 2009
Choice	Votes	%
For	43,268	73.73
Against	15,416	26.27
Total	58,684	100.00
Source: Philadelphia City Commissioners

Justice Woods Skipper retention, 2009
Choice	Votes	%
For	42,931	74.31
Against	14,839	25.69
Total	57,770	100.00
Source: Philadelphia City Commissioners

== Philadelphia Municipal Court partisan election ==
=== Democratic primary ===
==== Results ====
Democratic primary results (vote for up to 4)
Party	Candidate	Votes	%
Democratic	Charles Hayden	44,589	18.23
Democratic	Joseph C. Waters Jr.	40,189	16.43
Democratic	Dawn A. Segal	34,068	13.93
Democratic	Pat Dugan	25,358	10.37
Democratic	Kenneth J. Powell Jr.	24,234	9.91
Democratic	Joe Murphy	24,151	9.87
Democratic	Thomas M. Nocella	24,122	9.86
Democratic	Lopez Thompson	11,667	4.77
Democratic	Christine Adair	11,194	4.58
Democratic	Ted J. Vigilante	4,797	1.96
Democratic	Dawn M. Tancredi	154	0.06
Democratic	Adam Beloff	50	0.02
Democratic	Jonathan Q. Irvine	28	0.01
Write-in		16	0.01
Total votes		244,617	100.00

=== Republican primary ===
==== Results ====
Republican primary results (vote for up to 4)
Party	Candidate	Votes	%
Republican	Joe Murphy	7,331	28.38
Republican	Pat Dugan	6,953	26.92
Republican	Kenneth J. Powell Jr.	5,767	22.33
Republican	Joseph C. Waters Jr.	5,766	22.32
Write-in		12	0.05
Total votes		25,829	100.00

=== General election ===
2009 Philadelphia Municipal Court election (vote for up to 4)
Party	Candidate	Votes	%
Democratic	Charles Hayden	78,141	20.35
Republican	Charles Hayden	18,632	4.85
Total	Charles Hayden	96,773	25.20
Democratic	Dawn A. Segal	77,566	20.20
Republican	Dawn A. Segal	18,479	4.81
Total	Dawn A. Segal	96,045	25.01
Democratic	Joseph C. Waters Jr.	76,865	20.02
Republican	Joseph C. Waters Jr.	18,827	4.90
Total	Joseph C. Waters Jr.	95,692	24.92
Democratic	Pat Dugan	76,137	19.83
Republican	Pat Dugan	19,257	5.02
Total	Pat Dugan	95,394	24.84
Write-in		59	0.02
Total votes		383,963	100.00

== Philadelphia Municipal Court retention elections ==
Justice Brady retention, 2009
Choice	Votes	%
For	49,432	75.89
Against	15,705	24.11
Total	65,137	100.00
Source: Philadelphia City Commissioners

Justice Gilbert retention, 2009
Choice	Votes	%
For	45,185	75.37
Against	14,762	24.63
Total	59,947	100.00
Source: Philadelphia City Commissioners

Justice Kirkland retention, 2009
Choice	Votes	%
For	45,252	75.44
Against	14,732	24.56
Total	59,984	100.00
Source: Philadelphia City Commissioners

Justice Kosinski retention, 2009
Choice	Votes	%
For	46,208	74.35
Against	15,944	25.65
Total	62,152	100.00
Source: Philadelphia City Commissioners

Justice Neifield retention, 2009
Choice	Votes	%
For	44,038	74.25
Against	15,269	25.75
Total	59,307	100.00
Source: Philadelphia City Commissioners

Justice Washington retention, 2009
Choice	Votes	%
For	43,039	68.21
Against	20,062	31.79
Total	63,101	100.00
Source: Philadelphia City Commissioners

== Philadelphia Traffic Court retention elections ==
Justice De Angeles retention, 2009
Choice	Votes	%
For	49,493	75.14
Against	16,378	24.86
Total	65,871	100.00
Source: Philadelphia City Commissioners

Justice Green retention, 2009
Choice	Votes	%
For	46,188	73.41
Against	16,734	26.59
Total	62,922	100.00
Source: Philadelphia City Commissioners
