= Denise Smyler =

American lawyer

Denise J. Smyler

General Counsel of Pennsylvania
- In office January 20, 2015 – August 2019
- Governor: Tom Wolf
- Preceded by: Jarad W. Handelman
- Succeeded by: Gregory G. Schwab

Personal details
- Education: New York University (B.A.); Georgetown University (J.D.)
- Occupation: Attorney

Denise J. Smyler is an American attorney and former General Counsel of Pennsylvania, who served on the executive staff of Pennsylvania Governor Tom Wolf. She was previously a member of the Philadelphia Redevelopment Authority Board and an assistant district attorney.

The first female counsel to a Philadelphia police commissioner and the first female to serve as counsel to a Philadelphia prison commissioner, she was also the third woman and first African American to be appointed as Pennsylvania's general counsel.

In December 2019, she was appointed by Wolf to the Pennsylvania Gaming Control Board.

== Biography ==
Smyler is the founding attorney and owner of the Smyler Firm, which united with Wadud Ahmad and Joseph Zaffarese to form Ahmad, Zaffarese & Smyler, LLC in September 2013. Prior to her state appointment, Smyler worked as an assistant district attorney and as legal counsel to the Philadelphia Prison Commissioner before being appointed chief legal counsel to the Philadelphia Police Commissioner.

== Commonwealth public service ==
Smyler headed the Office of General Counsel (OGC), overseeing the provision of legal services to the governor, his senior staff, and more than thirty executive branch and independent agencies. As head of OGC, she worked to improve client service and strengthen the capacity of OGC lawyers. Among her accomplishments during her first eighteen months as general counsel, Smyler worked with Wolf to expand and create opportunities for small and diverse law firms to serve the Commonwealth as outside counsel.

In December 2019, Wolf appointed her to the Pennsylvania Gaming Control Board.
