= Charles Johnson (Pennsylvania politician) =

American politician (1855–1937)

Pennsylvania Secretary of Revenue
- In office 1929–1931
- Governor: John Stuchell Fisher
- Preceded by: Position created
- Succeeded by: Clyde L. King

Secretary of the Commonwealth of Pennsylvania
- In office 1927–1929
- Governor: John Stuchell Fisher
- Preceded by: E. H. Conarroe
- Succeeded by: Robert R. Lewis

Personal details
- Born: February 27, 1855 Norriton Township, Pennsylvania
- Died: April 10, 1937 (aged 82) Norristown, Pennsylvania
- Party: Republican

Charles A. Johnson (February 27, 1855 – April 10, 1937) was an American politician who was Secretary of the Commonwealth of Pennsylvania from 1927 to 1929 and Pennsylvania Secretary of Revenue from 1929 to 1931.

== Early life ==
Johnson was born on February 27, 1855 in Norriton Township, Pennsylvania to Joseph and Mary (Haupt) Johnson. Joseph Johnson was a prosperous farmer and Charles remained on the farm until 1889, when he moved to Norristown, Pennsylvania. In 1890, he established Brown, Cloud & Johnson, a real estate and insurance brokerage. He also served as a director of the People's National Bank, Albertson Trust and Safe Deposit Company, West Norristown Building and Loan Association, and the Daily Times Publishing Company.

On March 10, 1880, Johnson married Ida Smith. They had one daughter, Mary Elizabeth.

== Politics ==
From 1881 to 1889, Johnson was the Norriton Township tax collector. He then served as a Montgomery County deputy sheriff until 1891, when he became the county's mercantile appraiser. He returned to his previous position of deputy sheriff in 1893 and was elected county sheriff two years later. In 1900, he was appointed resident clerk of the Pennsylvania House of Representatives.

In 1901, Johnson was elected to the state Republican committee. He was the head of its speaker's bureau for three years. When James Buchanan Holland became a judge of the United States District Court for the Eastern District of Pennsylvania in 1904, Johnson succeeded him as the leader of the Republican Party in Montgomery County. In 1907, he became treasurer of the state Republican committee.

In 1911, Johnson was appointed insurance commissioner by Governor John K. Tener. He resigned in March 1916, alleging that Governor Martin Grove Brumbaugh was "attempting to purchase Brumbaugh votes with salaries paid by the state". Johnson's allegations were seen as an attack on Brumbaugh's presidential candidacy by U.S. Senator Boies Penrose, to whom Johnson was allied. In 1917, Johnson was appointed Deputy Pennsylvania Auditor General by Charles A. Snyder. He was retained by auditors general Samuel S. Lewis and Edward Martin.

In 1927, Johnson was appointed Secretary of the Commonwealth by Governor John Stuchell Fisher. In 1929, Fisher appointed Johnson to head the newly created post of secretary of revenue.

== Later life ==
Johnson led the Republican campaign in Montgomery County in the 1932 United States presidential election. Although Franklin D. Roosevelt won in a landslide, Republican Herbert Hoover won Montgomery County by a large margin. Johnson continued to serve on the Republican state committee until he suffered a stroke in 1934. Johnson died of a heart attack on April 10, 1937 at Montgomery Hospital in Norristown.
