= Robert R. Lewis =

American jurist (1880–1961)

Secretary of the Commonwealth of Pennsylvania
- In office 1929–1930
- Governor: John Stuchell Fisher
- Preceded by: Charles Johnson
- Succeeded by: James A. Walker

Personal details
- Born: August 1, 1880 Duke Center, Pennsylvania, U.S.
- Died: September 12, 1961 (aged 81) Coudersport, Pennsylvania
- Party: Republican

Robert Rathbun Lewis (August 1, 1880 – September 12, 1961) was an American jurist who was Secretary of the Commonwealth of Pennsylvania from 1929 to 1930 and judge of the court of common pleas of Potter County, Pennsylvania from 1930 to 1952. A member of the Republican Party, he held leadership positions in several civic and agricultural organizations, including the Black Forest Conservation Association and the Pennsylvania Co-Operative Potato Growers. Lewis also served as Grand Master of the Grand Lodge of Pennsylvania from 1938 to 1939 and was active in local Rotary and church work in Coudersport.

== Early life ==
Lewis was born on August 1, 1880, in Duke Center, Pennsylvania to Willis Irving and Lucretia (Rathbun) Lewis. He was a descendant of William Lewis, who immigrated to Massachusetts Bay Colony from Wales in 1632. Lewis was educated in the Coudersport, Pennsylvania public schools and graduated from the Wilbraham Wesleyan Academy in 1899. In 1903, he received his Bachelor of Philosophy degree from Wesleyan University.

== Career ==
After graduating, Lewis studied law under his father and was admitted to the Potter County bar in 1905. He began practicing in Coudersport with his father and A. F. Jones as the firm of Lewis, Jones and Lewis. The firm became Jones and Lewis following the elder Lewis' death on August 2, 1913.

Lewis served three terms as chairman of the Potter County Republican Party and was active in John Stuchell Fisher's campaign during the 1926 Pennsylvania gubernatorial election. On May 1, 1929, Lewis was appointed Secretary of the Commonwealth of Pennsylvania by Governor Fisher. He succeeded Charles Johnson, who was appointed Pennsylvania Secretary of Revenue. He took office on May 6, 1929.

In May 1930, Fisher named Lewis judge of the court of common pleas of Potter County. He was elected to a ten-year term in November 1931. In 1947, he sentenced George H. Chapman to death by electrocution after he pleaded guilty to murdering his wife. The case was known as the "pretty please" murder because Chapman told police he had shot his wife because she refused to say "pretty please". In 1951, Lewis was defeated for reelection by Walter Pierre Wells, who beat Lewis in both the Republican and Democratic primaries.

== Other work ==
Lewis was president of the Bayless Manufacturing Company of Austin, Pennsylvania, the Lewisville Water Company, and the Roulette Water Company, director and vice president of the Home Electric Company of Coudersport, and solicitor and director of the Citizens' Safe Deposit and Trust Company of Coudersport.

Lewis was chairman of the Black Forest Conservation Association and a trustee of Pennsylvania State College. He served on the reorganization committee of the Coudersport Public Library and spent many years on its board of directors. He was president of the Potter County farm bureau and a founder of the Pennsylvania Co-Operative Potato Growers. He was the PCPG's man of the year in 1956.

== Personal life ==
On July 7, 1907, Lewis married Margaret M. Wrean in Penn Yan, New York. They had one son and two daughters. Lewis was a member and trustee of Park Methodist Episcopal Church in Coudersport.

Lewis was commander-in-chief of the Coudersport Consistory, Ancient and Accepted Scottish Rite of Freemasonry, from 1918 to 1930 and was grand master of the Grand Lodge of Pennsylvania from 1938 to 1939. He also served as president of the Rotary Club of Coudersport.

Lewis died on September 12, 1961, at Memorial Hospital in Coudersport.

== See also ==
- Grand Lodge of Pennsylvania
