= Barton Fields =

American government official (1930–2022)

Pennsylvania Secretary of Revenue
- In office 1987–1989
- Governor: Bob Casey Sr.
- Preceded by: James I. Schemer
- Succeeded by: David L. Donahoe

Secretary of the Commonwealth of Pennsylvania
- In office 1977–1979
- Governor: Milton Shapp
- Preceded by: C. Delores Tucker
- Succeeded by: Ethel D. Allen

Personal details
- Born: May 22, 1930 Philadelphia, Pennsylvania
- Died: April 19, 2022 (aged 91) Wyncote, Pennsylvania
- Party: Democratic

Barton Archibald Fields (May 22, 1930 – April 19, 2022) was an American government official who was Secretary of the Commonwealth of Pennsylvania from 1977 to 1979 and Pennsylvania Secretary of Revenue from 1987 to 1989. He was Pennsylvania's first black revenue secretary.

== Early life ==
Fields was born in Philadelphia on May 22, 1930, to Archibald A. and Daisy A. Fields. His parents were immigrants from Barbados. His father was an elevator operator and his mother was a homemaker. Fields graduated from South Philadelphia High School in 1948 and earned a bachelor's degree in political science from Pennsylvania State University in 1954. He was a founding member of the Penn State chapter of Kappa Alpha Psi. After graduating, he enlisted in the United States Army and served as a staff sergeant in charge of a communications center in South Korea.

In 1957, Fields married Violet Wilkins and the couple settled in Harrisburg, Pennsylvania. They had two children. Violet Fields died in a car accident in 1983.

Fields served as president of the Greater Harrisburg NAACP and represented the Harrisburg area on the Democratic state committee. He was also chair of the Harristown Development Corporation, which promoted real estate development in downtown Harrisburg. He led the organization during the development of Strawberry Square and 333 Market Street.

== Government service ==
Fields' first political involvement came at the 1948 Democratic National Convention, when he joined A. Philip Randolph's labor movement in picketing the event in a protest against racial segregation in the United States Armed Forces. President Harry S. Truman signed Executive Order 9981 ending discrimination "on the basis of race, color, religion or national origin" in the United States Armed Forces 12 days after the convention.

Fields entered state government in 1956 as an administrative aide to Governor George M. Leader. He held the same position under Leader's successor, David L. Lawrence. In 1961, Fields was appointed the director of administrative services in the department of property and supplies. In this role, he was responsible for the personnel policy and records of 1,200 employees and preparing the department's $35 million annual operating budget. He later worked for the Pennsylvania Public Utility Commission. From 1968 to 1971, he was the chief of manpower, planning, recruitment, and placement in the Department of Education. He then served as the deputy secretary of the commonwealth in charge of the corporation bureau, the state employees retirement board, and the municipal employees retirement board.

In 1977, Governor Milton Shapp fired Secretary of the Commonwealth C. Delores Tucker for allegedly using state employees to write speeches for which she received payment and appointed Fields to succeed her. The move was seen as an effort to quell dissatisfaction caused by the firing of Pennsylvania's highest black official, but Shapp denied this, stating that Fields was "capable and qualified". Fields' appointment ended the black legislative caucus' effort to reinstate Tucker. In 1979, Shapp's Republican successor, Dick Thornburgh, appointed Ethel D. Allen to replace Fields, but Fields stayed on as Allen's deputy secretary. He resigned later that year when Thornburgh fired Allen. He then joined the Pennsylvania Auditor General's office as director of municipal pension and fire relief audits, where he remained until his retirement in 1986.

In 1987, Fields came out of retirement to serve as secretary of revenue in the administration of Governor Bob Casey. He was the first black person to hold this position. On January 20, 1989, Fields announced his resignation effective March 3.

== Later life ==
During the 1990s, Fields was a member of the Harrisburg school board. In 2014, he moved back to the Philadelphia area to be closer to his children. He died on April 19, 2022, from respiratory failure at his residence in Wyncote, Pennsylvania.
