= Teresa Osborne =

American civil service professional

Secretary of Aging of Pennsylvania
- In office May 13, 2015 – January 4, 2019
- Governor: Tom Wolf
- Preceded by: Brian Duke
- Succeeded by: Robert Torres

Personal details
- Born: Scranton, Pennsylvania, United States
- Education: Marywood University (B.S.W., M.H.A.)
- Occupation: Commissioner, Pennsylvania State Civil Service Commission; Former Secretary of Aging, Commonwealth of Pennsylvania
- Known for: Headed Pennsylvania's successful efforts to enact "Peggy's Law" to combat elder abuse and exploitation

Teresa Osborne is an American civil service professional and non-profit executive who served as a commissioner on the State Civil Service Commission of the Commonwealth of Pennsylvania in 2019 and 2020.

Previously, Osborne served in the administration of Pennsylvania Governor Tom Wolf as head of the Pennsylvania Department of Aging, having been confirmed by the Pennsylvania State Senate as Secretary of Aging for the Commonwealth of Pennsylvania in May 2015.

In 2007, she headed a statewide effort to secure the passage of "Peggy's Law" to provide greater protections for Pennsylvania's aging populating against elder abuse and exploitation.

In March 2020, she was appointed as manager of advocacy and outreach by AARP Pennsylvania.

== Formative years ==
Born in Scranton, Pennsylvania, Osborne earned her Bachelor of Social Work and Master of Health Service Administration degrees at Marywood University.

== Career ==
Prior to her state government tenure, Osborne served as the executive director of the Luzerne and Wyoming County Area Agency on Aging. She was then appointed as chancellor and chief operating officer of the Roman Catholic Diocese of Scranton.

In 2007, she headed a statewide effort to secure the passage of "Peggy's Law," a series of legislative acts that were designed to provide greater protections for Pennsylvania's aging populating against elder abuse and exploitation, and were enacted following the nursing home death from undiagnosed breast cancer of Peggy Rogers.

She also was appointed to the Mayor's Task Force on Law Enforcement & Mental Health in Scranton and played a key role in the planning and launch of the Northeast Behavioral Healthcare Consortium, a non-profit healthcare group that delivers services to more than ninety thousand members receiving medical assistance across a four-county region in northeastern Pennsylvania as part of the commonwealth's mandated managed care system.

In 2015, Osborne was nominated for the position of Pennsylvania Secretary of Aging by Pennsylvania Governor Tom Wolf. She was confirmed by the Pennsylvania State Senate for that post in May of that same year.

Osborne left the Department of Aging in January 2019; her final day of service with the department was officially listed as February 8 of that year. Robert Torres, previously the acting secretary of state, succeeded her as acting secretary of aging on January 15. He was confirmed by the Pennsylvania Senate on June 4.

Osborne was subsequently appointed to a seat on the Pennsylvania State Civil Service Commission and served as a commissioner on that state governing body which oversees the appointment and management of classified service employees across the Commonwealth of Pennsylvania.

In March 2020, she became the manager of advocacy and outreach for AARP Pennsylvania.

== See also ==
- Aging of the United States
- Civil service reform in the United States
- Government employees in the United States
