= Carol Aichele =

American politician and teacher

Secretary of the Commonwealth of Pennsylvania
- In office January 18, 2011^{[a]} – January 20, 2015
- Governor: Tom Corbett
- Preceded by: Basil Merenda
- Succeeded by: Pedro Cortés

Member of the Chester County Board of Commissioners
- In office January 5, 2004 – January 18, 2011
- Preceded by: Karen Martynick
- Succeeded by: Ryan Costello

Chester County Controller
- In office January 5, 1998 – January 5, 2004
- Preceded by: Joseph Carpenter
- Succeeded by: Val DiGiorgio

Personal details
- Born: February 9, 1950 (age 76)
- Party: Republican
- Spouse: Stephen Aichele
- Children: Three
- Education: Cornell University
- Occupation: Teacher, Politician
- Website: Carol Aichele, Secretary of the Commonwealth
- a. Aichele served as Acting Secretary until her nomination was approved by the State Senate on April 26, 2011.

Carol Aichele is an American politician and teacher. She previously served as Secretary of the Commonwealth of Pennsylvania from January 2011 to January 2015. A Republican, Aichele previously served on the Chester County Board of Commissioners.

== Teaching career and early political involvement ==
Aichele worked as a part-time teacher at the Agnes Irwin School in Rosemont and served on the board of directors of the Tredyffrin/Easttown School District. She was also a member of the Republican State Committee.

== Political career ==
=== County Controller ===
Aichele successfully ran for the office of Chester County Controller in 1997 defeating two other candidates in the primary, including future State Representative Duane Milne, and eventually succeeded retiring Republican incumbent Joseph Carpenter.

=== County Commissioner ===
After serving two terms as County Controller, Aichele sought and was elected to a seat on the Chester County Board of Commissioners in November 2003. She was re-elected four years later.

She briefly ran for the Republican nomination for lieutenant governor in 2010, but withdrew from the race several months before the election.

=== State Senate special election ===
In 2006, State Senator Bob Thompson died from pulmonary fibrosis at the Hospital of the University of Pennsylvania. Thompson, a longtime political force, had been re-elected to his 19th District Senate seat in 2004 without opposition. Aichele received the nomination of the county Republican Party for the May special election and squared off against her fellow County Commissioner Andy Dinniman. In what was considered a stunning upset, Dinniman defeated Aichele by twelve percentage points to become the first Democrat to represent Chester County in the State Senate since 1890.

=== Secretary of the Commonwealth ===
Incoming Governor Tom Corbett announced his intention to nominate Aichele for the position of Secretary of the Commonwealth in January 2011. Aichele resigned from the Board of Commissioners later that month and served as Acting Secretary until her nomination was unanimously approved by the State Senate in April. She served until January 20, 2015.

== Personal life ==
Her husband, Stephen Aichele, is an attorney who previously served as the Governor's General Counsel, and as the governor's Chief of Staff. The couple has three children, Steve, Kate and Tom.

Political offices
Preceded by Basil Merenda	Secretary of the Commonwealth of Pennsylvania; 2011 – 2015	Succeeded by Pedro Cortés
Preceded by Karen Martynick	Member of the Chester County Board of Commissioners; 2004 – 2011	Succeeded by Ryan Costello
Preceded by Joseph Carpenter	Chester County Controller; 1998 – 2004	Succeeded by Val DiGiorgio
