= Pennsylvania Department of Aging =

State government agency in Pennsylvania

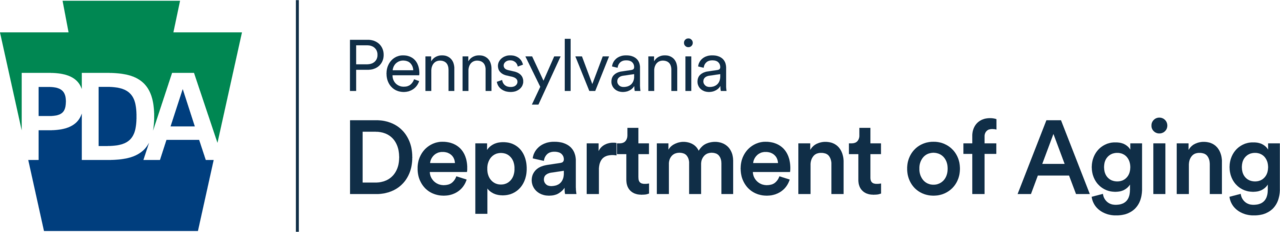

Agency overview
- Formed: June 1978
- Jurisdiction: Government of Pennsylvania
- Headquarters: 5th Floor, Forum Place 555 Walnut Street Harrisburg, Pennsylvania; 40°15′51″N 76°52′46″W
- Annual budget: $5.2 billion (FY 2010)
- Agency executive: Jason Kavulich, Secretary of Aging
- Website: www.aging.pa.gov

The Pennsylvania Department of Aging is a cabinet-level agency charged with providing aid to Pennsylvania's approximately three million individuals age 60 and older. Although the bureau operates some services directly, such as the Pharmaceutical Contact for the Elderly (PACE) prescription drug program, it generally serves as a clearinghouse of funding and information for county-level Area Agencies on Aging. The department was formed under the governorship of Milton Shapp.

== Services ==
Promotes prompt service delivery to consumers through the development of efficient program operational policies and practices across all aging services.

Administrative responsibilities include the state-level management of Older Americans Act Services, Caregiver Support Program, transportation, Senior Centers, OPTIONS, Veterans' Directed Home and Community-Based Services, Domiciliary Care, Aging In Place programs, Senior Housing, and nutrition services.

=== Caregiver support ===
The Pennsylvania Caregiver Support Program works to reduce the amount of stress not only on primary and informal caregivers but also on unpaid caregivers. Furthermore, this program helps support individuals over the age of 55 and older who care for adolescent members of their family.

These caregivers focus their efforts to aid a spouse, relative, or friend who is in need of assistance due to a disease or disability through

- Coordinated support via an appointed care manager
- Caregiving assistance
- Education
- Counseling
- Reimbursement for qualified supplies

==== Senior Community Service Employment Program ====
- Provides employment and training services to unemployed, low-income adults age 55 and over.

==== Commonwealth Workforce Deployment System ====
- Connects businesses and people to available services via PA CareerLink®

==== Office of Vocational Rehabilitation ====
- Prepares persons with disabilities via vocational rehabilitation services in order to obtain, or maintain, employment.

=== Health and wellness ===
- Health and Wellness program aims to promote healthier lifestyles among older Pennsylvanians so that there is a measurable improvement in their quality of life and subsequent reduction in overall healthcare costs. They provide workshops including fall prevention classes, nutrition classes, exercise classes, health screenings, and chronic disease self-management classes.

=== Help at home ===
- In order to keep aging citizens in their homes for as long as possible, the Department of Aging provides several services. These include Adult Day Care, Transportation, Home-Delivered Meals, Personal Assistance, and Care Services. This also includes Home Modifications, Care Management, Home Health Care, and Respite (break from caregiving).

=== Housing ===
==== Property tax and rent rebate ====
Through the Department of Revenue, rebates are made available for Pennsylvanians 65 and older, widows age 50 and older, and adults with disabilities. The program offers a maximum standard rebate of $650. The program covers homeowners making $0 to $35,000 a year or renters making $0 to $15,000 a year. Seniors living in high property tax areas and making under $30,000 a year can boost their homeowner rebate by up to %50. Additionally, the rebate is increased by %50 in the rest of the state so long as the household makes less than $30,000 a year and the household pays at least 15 percent of its income on property taxes.

==== Domiciliary care ====
Dom Care is a group home program for adults with disabilities that need assistance, supervision, support, and encouragement for those who lack the resources or capability to live independently. Dom Care homes are individual providers' homes. They are inspected annually to meet health and safety requirements.

=== Insurance ===
APRISE Counseling Service

- Free insurance counseling program that helps older Pennsylvanians with Medicare
- Counselors
  - Specially trained staff and volunteers
  - Provide "objective, easy-to-understand information about Medicare, Medicare Supplemental Insurance, Medicaid, and Long-Term Care Insurance."

=== Meals ===
==== Meals at senior community centers ====
- Available at nearly 600 Community Centers throughout Pennsylvania
- Available to individuals aged 60 and up, as well as their spouses
- Served once a day around noon
- Meals are prepared in coordination with each individuals diet plans, which are dependent on health issues, such as heart disease or diabetes
- They are free of charge but individuals may choose to donate

==== Home-delivered meals ====
- Individual, or family member, participates in an interview in order to determine eligibility
- Meals are delivered to the individual's home

==== Supplemental Nutrition Assistance Program (SNAP) ====
- New name for the Food Stamp Program
- Seniors who utilize these benefits may also qualify for monthly food boxes
- Seniors utilize these benefits in order to buy groceries, which increases their purchasing power.

==== Pennsylvania Senior Farmers Market Program ====
- Provides low-income older adults with four checks in order to buy fresh farm food in Pennsylvania
- Requirement is age 60 and up
- Must meet eligibility guidelines
- Each eligible senior may receive four $5.00 checks for a total of $20.00 one time during the program year.
- Married couples are eligible to receive eight $5.00 checks for a total of $40.00 one time during the program year.

=== Ombudsman ===
- Investigate and resolve complaints and issues on behalf of the consumer of long-term care services, such as nursing homes, assisted living facilities, and personal care homes.
- Provide education about residents' rights under federal and state law
- Friendly to visitors who come to visit residents who do not have family or friends to check in on them.

=== Prescriptions ===
Pennsylvania has two prescription programs, the Pharmaceutical Assistance Contract of the Elderly (PACE) and the Pharmaceutical Assistance Contract of the Elderly Needs Enhancement Tier (PACENET). PACE and PACENET are dedicated to helping the elderly with paying for their medications. As of the year 2014, social security's Medicare, part B premiums are no longer taken from your income tax.

==== Pharmaceutical Assistance Contract of the Elderly ====
In order to qualify for usage of PACE, as a Pennsylvania citizen, you must meet the following requirements.

- Must be 65 years of age or older.
- A resident of Pennsylvania for a minimum of 90 days prior to the date of which you apply.
- If currently enrolled in the Department of Human Services Medicaid prescription benefits you are prohibited from the PACE program.
- Single persons using the PACE program must have a total income of $14,500 or less. Married couples must not have a combined income higher than $17,700.

==== Pharmaceutical Assistance Contract of the Elderly Needs Enhancement Tier ====
In order to qualify for PACE, as a Pennsylvania citizen, you must meet the following requirements.

- Must be 65 years of age or older.
- A resident of Pennsylvania for a minimum of 90 days, prior to the date of which you apply.
- If currently enrolled in the Department of Human Services Medicaid prescription benefits you are prohibited from the PACE program.
- Single persons using the PACENET program must have a total income between $14,500 and $23,000. While married couples must have a combined income between $17,700 and $31,500.

Applicants can either apply at their local Area Agency on Aging or the Department of Aging website, www.aging.pa.gov under prescription assistance.

=== Protective services ===
Pennsylvanians over the age of 60 are protected by the Older Adults Protective Service Act. The Older Adults Protective Service Act, passed in 1987, protects those 60 years of age or above from physical, emotional, or sexual abuse, caregiver and self-neglect, financial exploitation and abandonment. Any acts of abuse can be reported to the Area Agency of Aging, all hours of the day seven days a week. Acts of abuse can be reported by anyone by calling 1-800-450-8505. All reports made are confidential.

=== Transportation ===
==== Pennsylvania Free Transit Program ====
- Provides free rides to those 65 years of age or older on local and fixed routes. Senior citizens must have their Medicare card or Commonwealth ID with them for proof of age requirement.

==== Shared Ride Program ====
- Sixty-five years of age or older, those who meet these requirements receive a reduced fare. Proof of age to register for program is required. 24 hour reservations are required.

== Secretaries of Aging ==
| Name | Dates served | Appointed by |
|---|---|---|
| Gorham L. Black, Jr. | 1979–1985 | Dick Thornburgh |
| Alma R. Jacobs | 1985–1987 | Dick Thornburgh |
| Linda M. Rhodes | 1987–1994 | Bob Casey Sr. |
| Sharon Alexander-Keilly | 1994–1995 | Bob Casey Sr. |
| Richard Browdie | 1995–2002 | Tom Ridge |
| Lori Gerhard (acting) | 2002–2003 | Mark Schweiker |
| Nora Dowd Eisenhower | 2003–2008 | Ed Rendell |
| John Michael Hall | 2008–2011 | Ed Rendell |
| Brian Duke | 2011–2015 | Tom Corbett |
| Teresa Osborne | 2015–2019 | Tom Wolf |
| Robert Torres | 2019–2023 | Tom Wolf |
| Jason Kavulich | 2023–present | Josh Shapiro |

== See also ==
- List of Pennsylvania state agencies
