= Ethel D. Allen =

American politician and physician (1929 – 1981)

- Ethel D. Allen, date unknown

Secretary of the Commonwealth of Pennsylvania
- In office January 16, 1979 – October 31, 1979
- Governor: Dick Thornburgh
- Preceded by: Barton Fields
- Succeeded by: William R. Davis

Member of the Philadelphia City Council from the at-large district
- In office January 5, 1976 – January 16, 1979
- Preceded by: Thomas M. Foglietta
- Succeeded by: Joan Specter

Member of the Philadelphia City Council from the 5th District
- In office January 3, 1972 – January 5, 1976
- Preceded by: Thomas McIntosh
- Succeeded by: Cecil B. Moore

Personal details
- Born: May 8, 1929 Philadelphia, Pennsylvania, U.S.
- Died: December 16, 1981 (aged 52) Philadelphia, Pennsylvania, U.S.
- Party: Republican
- Education: West Virginia State College; Philadelphia College of Osteopathic Medicine
- Profession: Politician; physician

Ethel D. Allen (May 8, 1929 – December 16, 1981) was an African-American politician and physician from the Republican Party, who served as the Secretary of the Commonwealth of Pennsylvania under governor Dick Thornburgh for 10 months, between January and October 1979. Prior to serving in the state cabinet, Allen was a member of the Philadelphia City Council from 1972 until 1979, representing both the 5th and At-Large Districts.

== Early life ==
Allen was born in Philadelphia and raised by Baptist parents. She attended Catholic school, however, converting and remaining a Catholic for the rest of her life. She attended J. W. Hallahan Catholic Girls High School.

She studied at West Virginia State College, where she majored in chemistry and biology with a minor in mathematics, and went on to earn her Doctor of Osteopathy from the Philadelphia College of Osteopathic Medicine in 1963. While her parents were active in local Democratic politics, Allen eventually became a Republican volunteer, working for a variety of campaigns, including that of Dwight Eisenhower in 1952. She would jokingly describe herself as a "B.F.R. – a black, female Republican, an entity as rare as a black elephant and just as smart."

As a self-described "ghetto practitioner," Allen worked in difficult and often dangerous circumstances in some of Philadelphia's poorest neighborhoods. At one point, she was lured to a false house call and found herself the target of a robbery. Four men had surrounded her, hoping to get drugs from her medical bag, but she escaped safely after wielding her gun and sending the would-be robbers running.

== Political career ==
=== City Council ===
Allen decided that the best way for her to combat the crime she saw as a practicing physician was to become more involved in politics. In 1971, she ran for Philadelphia City Council. That year, buoyed by a series of strong debate performances, she unseated incumbent Democratic Councilman Thomas McIntosh in the Fifth District. With her election, she became the first African-American woman to serve on city council. During her tenure, Allen sponsored legislation that resulted in the creation of the Philadelphia Youth Commission to help address issues with urban gangs.

In 1975, Allen decided to seek re-election to Council, but this time ran for one of Council's at-large seats. She won one of the two seats reserved for nonmembers of the majority Democratic Party, taking over the seat vacated by Tom Foglietta, who was the party's nominee for Mayor in that year's election. While on Council, Allen was known as a tough, outspoken politician, often clashing with Mayor Frank Rizzo and Council President George Schwartz. As her local profile rose, so too did her national presence rise. At the 1976 Republican National Convention, Allen gave the seconding speech in support of President Gerald Ford's nomination.

=== State Secretary ===
In January 1979, incoming Governor Dick Thornburgh named Allen his choice for Secretary of the Commonwealth. Allen had reportedly told city Republican leaders that she would turn-down Thornburgh's offer if they assured her that she would have an unobstructed path to the party's nomination for that year's Mayoral election; when she did not receive such assurances, she accepted Thornburgh's offer.

In October of that year, Thornburgh's cabinet was rocked by several resignations. Two officials–the Secretary of Health and the Secretary of Labor–had resigned due to discomfort in government and an inability to work effectively with their colleagues. As a result of the increased scrutiny put on his cabinet, Thornburgh met with Allen to discuss allegations of absenteeism and impropriety that had been made against her. Allen was reportedly absent from her Harrisburg office for more than half of a 40-day period earlier that year, and had allegedly received honorariums for speeches that had been prepared by state employees. For her part, Allen asserted that her absences were necessary to effectively carry-out her duties, and that she had only used a state worker to merely help write two speeches for which she had earned a total of $1,000. These speeches, she asserted, represented only a small percentage of the number of speeches she had given since taking office. Thornburgh, however asked Allen resign, and when she refused to do so, he fired her. Two years earlier, Governor Milton Shapp had fired C. Delores Tucker, who was also serving as Secretary of the Commonwealth, for using public employees to assist in the preparation of speeches for which a fee was received.

== Later life and legacy ==
Allen's firing brought a significant backlash against Thornburgh from the African-American community and various civil rights groups. Some asserted that Allen was held to a different standard because of her skin color, gender, or both; others charged that the Governor's actions were politically motivated.

Her dismissal from Thornburgh's cabinet brought an end to her political career. She would serve for just over one year as the Philadelphia School District's clinician with management responsibilities.

In December 1981, she died due to complications from double-bypass heart surgery. While Allen never married and had no children, her legacy as trailblazer survived her. She often encouraged African-Americans and women to seek political office; indeed, her friend Augusta Clark would later become the second African-American woman to serve on Philadelphia City Council, eventually becoming the Democratic Majority Whip. In 1982, the School District of Philadelphia changed the name of the then Lehigh Elementary School to the Dr. Ethel D. Allen School, in honor of Dr. Allen.

Political offices
Preceded by Barton Fields	Secretary of the Commonwealth of Pennsylvania; 1979	Succeeded by William Davis
Philadelphia City Council
Preceded by Tom Foglietta	Member of the Philadelphia City Council for the At-Large District; 1976–1979	Succeeded by Joan Specter
Preceded by Thomas McIntosh	Member of the Philadelphia City Council for the 5th District; 1972–1976	Succeeded by Cecil B. Moore
