= Cecil B. Moore =

American lawyer and civil rights activist (1915–1979)

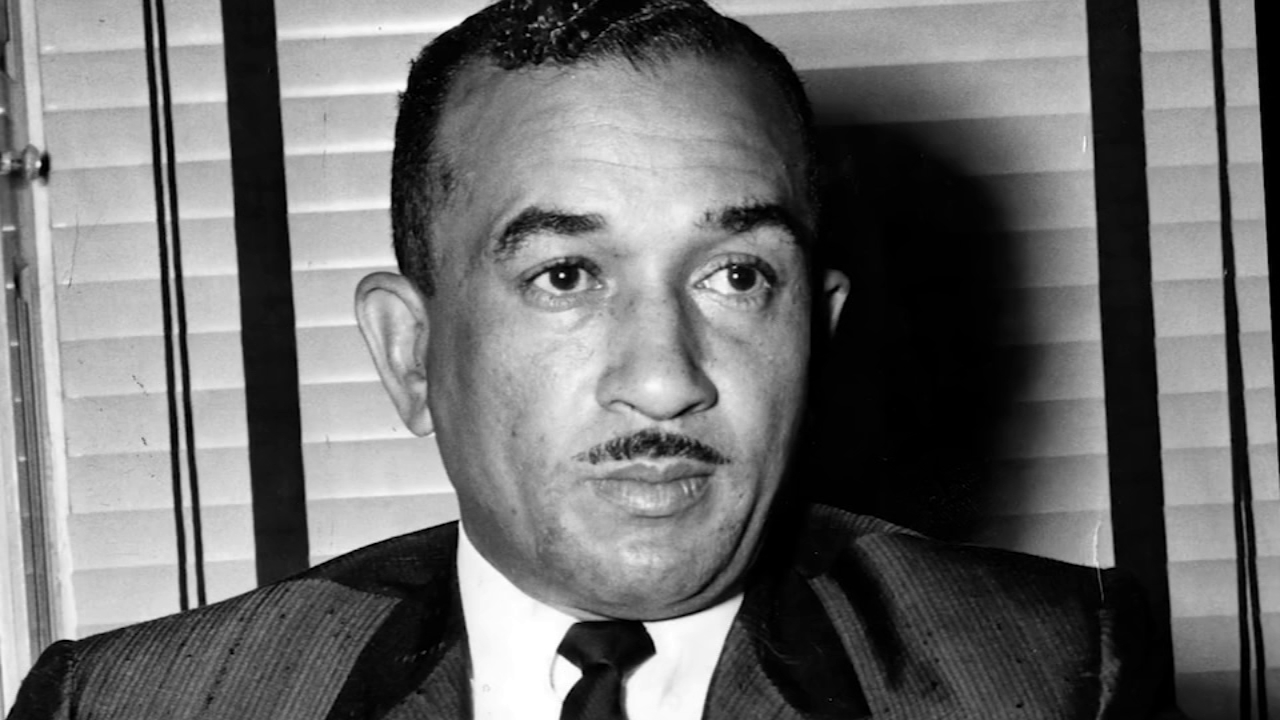

Member of the Philadelphia City Council from the 5th District
- In office January 5, 1976 – February 13, 1979
- Preceded by: Ethel D. Allen
- Succeeded by: John Street

Personal details
- Born: April 2, 1915 West Virginia, U.S.
- Died: February 15, 1979 (aged 63) Philadelphia, Pennsylvania, U.S.
- Education: Bluefield State University; Temple University

Military service
- Allegiance: United States
- Branch/service: Marine Corps
- Battles/wars: World War II

Cecil Bassett Moore (April 2, 1915 – February 13, 1979) was an American lawyer, politician and civil rights activist who served as president of the Philadelphia NAACP chapter and as a member of Philadelphia's city council. He led protests to desegregate Girard College.

== Early life and education ==
Moore was born in 1915 in West Virginia. He attended High School in Kentucky but returned to West Virginia to study at Bluefield State College. He worked as a traveling insurance salesman and served in the U.S. Marine Corps during World War II. In 1947, after his discharge at Fort Mifflin, he moved to Philadelphia and studied law at Temple University and received his law degree in 1953. Moore attended school at night and financed his studies with a job as a liquor wholesaler.

== Career ==
Moore cultivated ties with the bar owners to whom he sold his wares, and they became an important basis for his political constituency later in his career. He earned a reputation as a no-nonsense lawyer who fought on behalf of his mostly poor, African-American clients concentrated in North Philadelphia. His cases often concerned police brutality, which brought him into conflict with the police commander and later police chief, Frank Rizzo. From 1963 to 1967, he served as president of the Philadelphia chapter of the NAACP. He also served on the Philadelphia City Council.

An advocate of militant protest, Moore organized demonstrations against workplace discrimination at construction sites in Philadelphia in 1963 and 1964, and is best remembered for leading a picket against Girard College in 1964, which hastened the desegregation of that school. He was a champion of a wide range of causes central to the Civil Rights Movement, including integration of schools and trade unions, police brutality, and increased political and economic representation for poor African Americans. He attempted to restore order after the unsettling vandalism and violence of the Columbia Avenue riot of 1964.

In 1965, Moore disrupted a performance by singer Nancy Wilson at a New Jersey casino by heckling Wilson for 45 minutes. Moore confronted Wilson over an article in the Los Angeles Sentinel that quoted Wilson as saying she had to hire white lawyers and accountants because it was impossible for her to find Black lawyers and accountants with the experience needed to handle her affairs. Wilson later stated she was misquoted and that her remarks were taken out of context. Moore demanded a public apology from Wilson. When Wilson did not apologize, Moore heckled Wilson and engaged in a scuffle with one audience member. At one point, Moore reportedly called Wilson an “Aunt Jemima bitch”. Moore told Jet, “my only regret is cursing her, although she deserved it.”

Moore's aggressive manner and confrontational tactics alienated many leaders, black and white, including many within the NAACP who preferred negotiation "behind closed doors" over direct action. He was a fierce critic of established civil rights leaders in Philadelphia, including lawyers A. Leon Higginbotham and Raymond Pace Alexander, and led a successful insurgency to take over the NAACP branch in 1963. Moore recruited NAACP members in working-class neighborhoods, but his harsh criticism of the black bourgeoisie and of white philanthropists led to a decline in their support for the branch under his leadership. The rifts brought friction with the national NAACP, which undercut Moore's power by splitting the Philadelphia chapter into three sub-branches.

Moore also gravitated toward black power in the mid-1960s. He acknowledged how his military service shaped his grassroots activism: "I was determined when I got back [from World War II combat] that what rights I didn't have I was going to take, using every weapon in the arsenal of democracy. After nine years in the Marine Corps, I don't intend to take another order from any son of a bitch that walks." Moore actively discouraged Martin Luther King Jr. from visiting Philadelphia and he was one of the first civil rights leaders to have welcomed Malcolm X's growing role in the national movement.

Moore's fiery rhetoric and confrontational style helped him cultivate a working-class constituency, which enabled him to run independent black political campaigns outside the white establishment and traditional middle-class black networks. In 1967, he ran an unsuccessful campaign for mayor, and in 1975, Moore sought the Fifth District seat on the Philadelphia City Council, after incumbent Councilwoman Ethel D. Allen announced she would vacate the seat, and seek re-election to an at-large seat. Moore would go on to win the election. As Moore was nearing the end of his first term, attorney John Street announced his intention to challenge Moore for his seat in the 1979 election. While Moore was, by that time, in failing health, he initially vowed to see-off the challenge from Street. However, he died of a heart attack in 1979 before the May primary. Street went on to win the election, and quelled some of the tensions over his original challenge to Moore by sponsoring a bill to rename the former Columbia Avenue in Moore's honor.

Over time, appreciation for Moore has grown beyond the working poor with whom he long enjoyed popularity, and he is cited as a pivotal figure in the fields of social justice and race relations.

== In popular culture ==
Moore is portrayed by Peter Jay Fernandez in the 2019 Martin Scorsese film The Irishman.

== See also ==
- Cecil B. Moore (SEPTA station)
- Cecil B. Moore Avenue
- 1967 Philadelphia mayoral election
