= C. Delores Tucker =

American politician and activist (1927–2005)

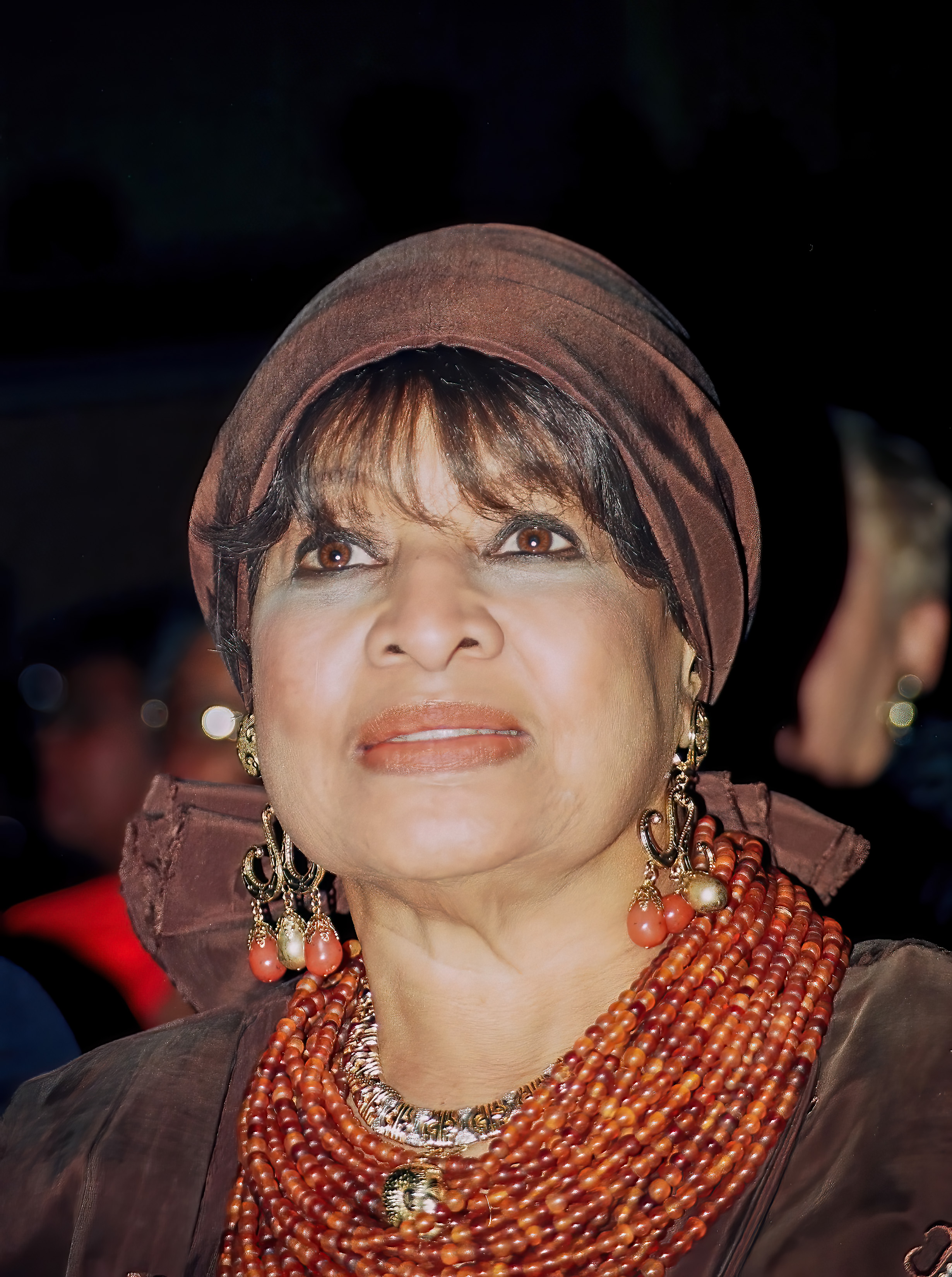

Secretary of the Commonwealth of Pennsylvania
- In office January 20, 1971 – September 21, 1977
- Governor: Milton Shapp
- Preceded by: Joseph Kelley
- Succeeded by: Barton Fields

Personal details
- Born: Cynthia Delores Nottage; October 4, 1927 Philadelphia, Pennsylvania, U.S.
- Died: October 12, 2005 (aged 78) East Norriton Township, Pennsylvania, U.S.
- Party: Democratic
- Spouse: William Tucker (m. 1951)
- Education: Temple University (attended); The Wharton School
- Profession: Politician; civil rights activist

Cynthia Delores Tucker (née Nottage; October 4, 1927 – October 12, 2005) was an American politician and civil rights activist. She had a long history of involvement in the American Civil Rights Movement. She was Secretary of the Commonwealth of Pennsylvania from 1971 to 1977. From the 1990s onward, she campaigned against gangsta rap music.

== Early life and education ==
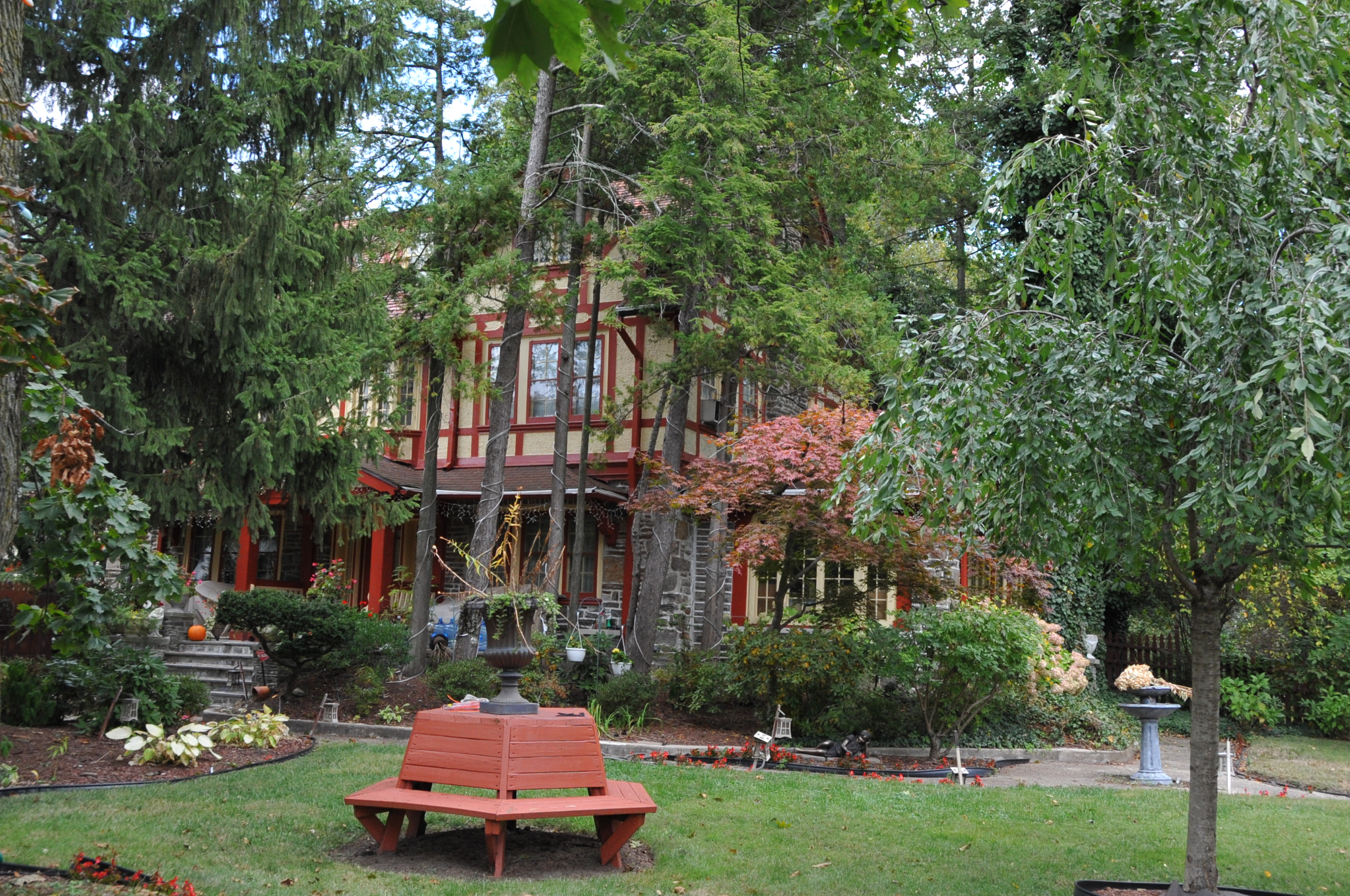
Tucker's house on Lincoln Drive in Philadelphia

Cynthia Delores Nottage was born in Philadelphia to Whitfield and Captilda Nottage (née Gardiner), both of whom were originally from the Bahamas. She was the tenth of thirteen children.

Tucker attended Temple University but did not graduate. She also attended the University of Pennsylvania's Wharton School of Business. Tucker was later the recipient of two honorary doctoral degrees from Morris College in Sumter, South Carolina, Baptist Training Union in Philadelphia, Pennsylvania, and California State University, Northridge.

== Career ==
=== Civil rights movement ===
Tucker became involved with the civil rights movement when she registered Black voters for a Philadelphia mayoral election in 1951. In 1965, she participated in the Selma to Montgomery marches alongside Martin Luther King Jr. and raised funds for the NAACP.

In 1990, Tucker, along with 15 other African American women and men, formed the African-American Women for Reproductive Freedom. She was the convening founder and national chair of the National Congress of Black Women, Inc. (NCBW), having succeeded Shirley Chisholm in 1992.

=== Political ===
In 1968, Philadelphia mayor James Tate appointed Tucker to the Zoning Board of Adjustment, making her the first African American and the first woman to serve in that position.

In 1971, Tucker became the first black female Secretary of State when Pennsylvania Governor Milton Shapp appointed her Secretary of the Commonwealth of Pennsylvania. During her tenure, she instituted the first Commission on the Status of Women. Tucker also was responsible for the Governor's appointment of more women judges and more women and African Americans to boards and commissions than ever before. She also led the effort to make Pennsylvania one of the first states to pass the Equal Rights Amendment (ERA). As Chief of Elections of Pennsylvania, she instituted a voter registration by mail and reduced the voting age from 21 to 18 years of age.

In September 1977, Shapp fired Tucker for allegedly using state employees to write speeches for which she received honorariums. A three-month investigation revealed that Tucker received $66,931 in honorariums from January 1975 to April 30, 1977. Two years later, one of Tucker's successors as Secretary of the Commonwealth, Ethel D. Allen, was also fired for using public employees to write speeches.

She was the founder and president of the Bethune-DuBois Institute, Inc., which she established in 1991 to promote the cultural development of African American youth through scholarships and educational programs.

=== Business ===
In the 1970s, Tucker faced controversy regarding her connections to the United Bank of Mortgage Corporation (UBMC), a Philadelphia lending institution that was later accused of processing large numbers of defective inner-city mortgages insured by the Federal Housing Administration and the Veterans Administration. At the time, Tucker not only managed Pennsylvania's state office that investigated real estate complaints, but she was also a licensed real estate broker and a stockholder in the UBMC.

Reports noted that her husband, William Tucker, was a well-connected real estate speculator who sold numerous UBMC-financed properties. In one case, their real estate agency sold a North Philadelphia home that suffered a collapsed back wall within six months of sale, yet the property had still been insured under a federally backed mortgage. The Philadelphia Inquirer highlighted these issues when disclosing the UBMC's practices, raising questions about Tucker’s dual role as both regulator and participant in the real estate market.

=== Media ===
In 1988, Tucker made an extended appearance on a British television discussion programme, After Dark.

== Hip-hop/rap music ==
Tucker dedicated much of the last decade of her life to condemning sexually explicit lyrics in rap and hip-hop tracks, citing a concern that the lyrics were misogynistic and threatened the moral foundation of the African American community.

Called "narrow-minded" by some rappers who often mentioned her in their lyrics, Tucker picketed stores that sold rap music and bought stock in Sony, Time Warner, and other companies in order to protest hip-hop at their shareholders' meetings. She also fought against the NAACP's decision to nominate late rapper Tupac Shakur for one of its Image Awards and filed a $10 million lawsuit against his estate for comments that the rapper made in his song "How Do U Want It" on the album All Eyez on Me, in which Shakur rapped "C. Delores Tucker you's a motherfucker / Instead of trying to help a nigga you destroy a brother". In her lawsuit, Tucker claimed that comments in this song, and on the track "Wonda Why They Call U Bytch" from the same album, inflicted emotional distress, were slanderous, and invaded her privacy. This case was eventually dismissed.

Other rappers have taken similar stances. In his song "Church for Thugs", The Game raps "I've got more hatred in my soul than Pac had for Delores Tucker." Jay-Z chimes in as well, with the lines "I don't care if you're C. Dolores Tucker or you're Bill O'Reilly, you only riling me up," from The Black Album's "Threat." Lil' Kim also referenced her in a leftover track, entitled "Rockin' It", from her second studio album. Kim raps "C. Delores T., Screw her, I never knew her", after Tucker dubbed her music as "gangsta porno rap" and "filth".

Much of KRS-One and Channel Live's "Free Mumia" is a direct criticism of what the MCs see as Tucker's misplaced energy. Lil Wayne also referenced her a couple times, once on his leftover song "Million Dollar Baby" rapping "Can't be banned I'm sorry Miss Delores" and more recently on his Carter IV album song "Megaman" rapping "The heater ima Tucker, Tucker, like Delores." Eminem referenced her in the song "Rap Game" by D12 rapping "Tell that C. Delores Tucker slut to suck a dick". Tucker later went on to serve on the advisory board of the Parents Television Council until her death in 2005.

== Accolades ==
Selected as one of "25 of the World's Most Intriguing People" by People magazine, Tucker was also selected as a People Magazine 1996 Yearbook honoree. She was featured in the inaugural issue of John F. Kennedy Jr.'s George magazine for her crusade against gangsta rap. In addition, Tucker has been acknowledged for her deep concern for children by First Lady Hillary Clinton in the book It Takes a Village. The National Women's Political Caucus and Redbook also named her as the woman best qualified to be a United States Ambassador to the United Nations.

For five consecutive years, from 1972 through 1977, she was listed as among Ebony magazine's "100 Most Influential Black Americans". During that period, she was listed as Ladies Home Journal Nominee for Woman of the Year in both 1975 and 1976. She was recognized by Ebony as one of the "100 Most Influential Black Organization Leaders" in the country in 2001 and 2002. Tucker was also a prominent member of Alpha Kappa Alpha sorority.

On April 25, 2006, a state historical marker honoring Tucker was unveiled by her husband and Governor Ed Rendell in a ceremony at the State Museum of Pennsylvania, in Harrisburg. In addition, it was announced that the North Building, which is adjacent to the State Capitol Building, was to be renamed the Secretary C. Delores Tucker Building. The state marker, which was commissioned by the Pennsylvania Historical and Museum Commission, was installed outside the entrance to the building. The marker reads:

C. Delores Tucker

1927–2005

Civil rights leader and activist for
women, she was the first African American
Secretary of State in the nation.
Championed the PA Equal Rights Amendment
and policies on affirmative action, voter
registration by mail, and lowering the
voting age to 18. Spearheaded the creation
of the Commission on the Status of Women &
led a successful crusade critical of the
music industry and lyrics demeaning to
women, African Americans, and children.

== Personal life and death ==
In 1951, Tucker married William Tucker, a Philadelphia real estate agent. Tucker herself had worked in real estate and insurance sales early in her career. Tucker had no children.

She died on October 12, 2005, in East Norriton Township, Pennsylvania, at the age of 78. She is interred at West Laurel Hill Cemetery in Bala Cynwyd, Pennsylvania.

Political offices
Preceded by Joseph Kelley	Secretary of the Commonwealth of Pennsylvania; 1971–1977	Succeeded by Barton Fields
