= Barbara Adams (attorney) =

American politician (born 1951)

- Born: November 17, 1951 (age 74); Hutchinson, Kansas, U.S.
- Education: Smith College, Temple University School of Law
- Occupation: General Counsel of Pennsylvania (2005–2011)

Barbara Adams (born November 17, 1951) was appointed General counsel of Pennsylvania on June 1, 2005 by Governor Edward G. Rendell, a post she held until January 17, 2011.

Adams was born in Hutchinson, Kansas on November 17, 1951. Sh was raised in Pottsville, Pennsylvania, and had been a partner with Duane Morris LLP in Philadelphia from 1986, a firm she joined originally as a summer associate in 1977.

Adams graduated from Temple University School of Law in 1978 and previously from Smith College.

Government offices
Preceded by Leslie Anne Miller	General Counsel of Pennsylvania; 2005–2011	Succeeded by Stephen S. Aichele
