= Leslie Anne Miller =

American lawyer

- Born: Harrisburg, Pennsylvania
- Occupations: Board of Trustees, Philadelphia Museum of Art (2016-present); first female president, Pennsylvania Bar Association; former General Counsel of Pennsylvania
- Notable work: Author, Start With a House, Finish With a Collection.
- Spouse: Richard B. Worley

Leslie Anne Miller is a Pennsylvania attorney and philanthropist who served as General Counsel of Pennsylvania under Governor Ed Rendell.

She was named to the PoliticsPA "Power 50" list of influential individuals in Pennsylvania politics in 2003. The Pennsylvania Report named her to the 2003 "The Pennsylvania Report Power 75" list of influential figures in Pennsylvania politics. She was also named to the PoliticsPA list of "Pennsylvania's Most Politically Powerful Women."

She has also served on the boards of directors of multiple arts organizations and educational institutions, including the Pennsylvania Ballet and Philadelphia Museum of Art. Miller was elected to the American Philosophical Society in 2022.

== Formative years and education ==
A native of Harrisburg, Pennsylvania, Miller graduated cum laude with a bachelor's degree from Mount Holyoke College in 1973, and was awarded a master's degree in political science from the Graduate School of New Brunswick at Rutgers University in 1974. While at Rutgers, she was awarded a fellowship by the Eagleton Institute of Politics.

That same year (1974), she also earned her Legum Magister (master's degree in law) from Temple University.

== Legal and public service career ==
A practicing attorney with more than 25 years of experience representing clients in civil litigation and mediation matters in the state courts of Philadelphia, the five counties surrounding Philadelphia, and the Eastern and Middle District Courts of Pennsylvania, Miller's expertise in civil litigation and mediation was recognized with a partnership by the Philadelphia law firm of McKissock & Hoffman, P.C.

A member of the Philadelphia Bar Association, she was appointed chair of the Pennsylvania Bar Association's House of Delegates, Commission on Women in the Profession, and Young Lawyers Division before being appointed as that state bar's first female president.

In January 2003, she was appointed General Counsel of the Commonwealth of Pennsylvania by Governor Edward G. Rendell. The first woman to be appointed to this position, she served as a member of the governor's cabinet, and directed a staff of 450 attorneys who were involved in representing the governor and 32 agencies with respect to civil, criminal, legislative, regulatory, and transactional matters. She resigned from this position in early 2005 to avoid the perception of a conflict of interest resulting from her participation in a lawsuit against Pennsylvania State University.

Miller has also served as a continuing legal education faculty member for organizations across the state, including the Pennsylvania Bar Institute, the Philadelphia Bar Association, Dickinson Law School's Trial Advocacy Seminar, and Temple Law School's Academy of Advocacy, as well as judge pro tempore for the Court of Common Pleas and Philadelphia County.

== Personal life ==
Miller is married to Richard Worley, who is a Managing Director and Partner at Permit Capital, LLC.

She has been called "an avid art and antiques collector and gardener." Her book, Start With a House, Finish With a Collection, was published in 2014.

=== Philanthropy and community service ===
Appointed to the board of trustees of the Philadelphia Museum of Art in 2011, Miller was then elected as chair of that board in October 2016, succeeding former board chair Constance H. Williams, who was named chair emerita. At the time of the appointment, Miller's husband, Richard B. Worley, was chairman of the board for the Philadelphia Orchestra. According to 2018 news reports, Miller had assumed a significant role in raising $525 million in support of the multimillion dollar renovation of the Philadelphia Museum of Art (expected completion in 2020). Interviewed in 2018 regarding her professional and public service, Miller expressed her view of the importance of the arts, noting:

"Our museum is a very important civic partner and is making a huge contribution on multiple levels. The arts, and culture in general, provide nourishment for the soul, and I think that they are a source of hope. They’re a gift in our midst, and they are a gift that is largely accessible to all."

==== Controversy Surrounding Sasha Suda's Dismissal ====
In November 2025, Leslie Anne Miller was named in a lawsuit filed by former Philadelphia Museum of Art (PAM) Director Sasha Suda. Suda’s suit alleges that Miller, in her capacity as Board Chair, played a central role in undermining her leadership and fostering a toxic environment at the museum.

==== Board Culture and Governance ====
Previously, Miller served as a member of the board during the early years of the Kimmel Center for the Performing Arts, as well as on the boards of the Pennsylvania Ballet, the Free Library of Philadelphia, the Medical College of Pennsylvania, the Pennsylvania Horticultural Society, and the Philadelphia Flower Show, as well as on the board of her alma mater, Mount Holyoke College.

Government offices
Preceded by Jim Sheehan	General Counsel of Pennsylvania; 2003–2005	Succeeded by Barbara Adams
