= Secretary of the Commonwealth of Pennsylvania =

U.S. state official

- Seal of the secretary of the Commonwealth of Pennsylvania

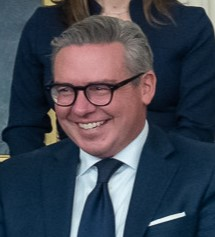
- Incumbent; Al Schmidt since June 29, 2023 (Note: Acting: January 17, 2023 – June 29, 2023)
- Appointer: Governor
- Inaugural holder: Timothy Matlack
- Formation: 1777
- Website: Official website

The secretary of the Commonwealth of Pennsylvania is the head of the Pennsylvania Department of State, a cabinet-level agency. The secretary of the commonwealth (equivalent to "secretary of state") is appointed by the governor, subject to confirmation by the State Senate. The current secretary is Republican Al Schmidt, who was appointed by Governor Josh Shapiro.

== Responsibilities ==
The Pennsylvania Department of State protects the public's health, safety, and welfare by licensing more than one million business, health, and real estate professionals; maintaining registration and financial information for thousands of charities soliciting contributions from Pennsylvanians; overseeing Pennsylvania's electoral process; maintaining corporate filings; and sanctioning professional boxing, kick–boxing and wrestling in the commonwealth.

The secretary is the keeper of the Great Seal of the Commonwealth and authenticates government documents through the seal's use. The secretary is also the commonwealth's chief election official.

== Structure of the Department of State ==
The Pennsylvania Department of State consists of six bureaus:

- Bureau of Corporations and Charitable Organizations
- Bureau of Finance and Operations
- Bureau of Enforcement and Investigation
- Bureau of Professional and Occupational Affairs
- Bureau of Commissions, Elections, and Legislation
- State Athletic Commission

== Boards and commissions ==
- Chairman of the Pennsylvania Election Reform Task Force
- Chairman of the Navigation Commission for the Delaware River and Its Navigable Tributaries
- The Board of Finance and Revenue
- The Board of Property
- The Pennsylvania Municipal Retirement Board
- The State Athletic Commission
- The Interbranch Commission for Gender, Racial and Ethnic Fairness
- The Lobbying Disclosure Regulations Committee

== List of secretaries of the commonwealth ==
Image	Name	Term	Appointed by
	Timothy Matlack	1777–1783	Thomas Wharton Jr.
	John Armstrong, Jr.	1783–1787	John Dickinson
	Charles Biddle	1787–1791	Benjamin Franklin
	Alexander J. Dallas	1791–1801	Thomas Mifflin
	Thomas McKean Thompson	1801–1808	Thomas McKean
	Nathaniel B. Boileau	1808–1817	Simon Snyder
	Thomas Sergeant	1817–1819	William Findlay
	Samuel D. Ingham	1819–1820	William Findlay
	Andrew Gregg	1820–1823	Joseph Hiester
	Molton C. Rogers	1823–1826	John Andrew Shulze
	Isaac D. Barnard	1826–1827	John Andrew Shulze
	Calvin Blythe	1827–1829	John Andrew Shulze
	Samuel McKean	1829–1833	George Wolf
	James Findley	1833–1835	George Wolf
	Thomas Henry Burrowes	1835–1839	Joseph Ritner
	Francis R. Shunk	1839–1842	David R. Porter
	Anson V. Parsons	1842–1843	David R. Porter
	Charles McClure	1843–1845	David R. Porter
	Jesse Miller	1845–1848	Francis R. Shunk
	Townsend Haines	1848–1850	William F. Johnston
	Alexander L. Russel	1850–1852	William F. Johnston
	Francis W. Hughes	1852–1853	William Bigler
	Charles A Black	1853–1855	William Bigler
	Andrew Gregg Curtin	1855–1858	James Pollock
	William M. Heister	1858–1861	William F. Packer
	Eli Slifer	1861–1867	Andrew Gregg Curtin
	Francis Jordan	1867–1873	John W. Geary
	Matthew S. Quay	1873–1878	John F. Hartranft
	John Blair Linn	1878–1879	John F. Hartranft
	Matthew S. Quay	1879–1882	Henry M. Hoyt
	Francis Jordan	1882–1883	Henry M. Hoyt
	William S. Stenger	1883–1887	Robert E. Pattison
	Charles Warren Stone	1887–1890	James A. Beaver
	Jacob H. Longnecker	1890–1891	James A. Beaver
	William F. Harrity	1891–1895	Robert E. Pattison
	Frank Reeder	1895–1897	Daniel H. Hastings
	David Martin	1897–1899	Daniel H. Hastings
	William Walton Griest	1899–1903	William A. Stone
	Frank M. Fuller	1903–1905	Samuel W. Pennypacker
	Robert B. McAfee	1905–1915	Samuel W. Pennypacker
	Cyrus Woods	1915–1921	Martin Grove Brumbaugh
	Bernard J. Myers	1921–1923	William Cameron Sproul
	Clyde L. King	1923–1926	Gifford Pinchot
	E. H. Conarroe	1926–1927	Gifford Pinchot
	Charles Johnson	1927–1929	John Stuchell Fisher
	Robert R. Lewis	1929–1930	John Stuchell Fisher
	James Walker	1930–1931	John Stuchell Fisher
	Richard J. Beamish	1931–1934	Gifford Pinchot
	John J. Owen	1934–1935	Gifford Pinchot
	David L. Lawrence	1935–1939	George Earle
	Sophia O'Hara	1939–1943	Arthur James
	Charles M. Morrison	1943–1949	Edward Martin
	Gene D. Smith	1949–1955	James H. Duff
	James A. Finnegan	1955	Edward Martin
	Henry Harner	1955–1956	George M. Leader
	James A. Finnegan	1956–1958	George M. Leader
	John S. Rice	1958–1961	George M. Leader
	E. James Trimarchi	1961–1963	David L. Lawrence
	George I. Bloom	1963–1965	William Scranton
	W. Stuart Helm	1965–1967	William Scranton
	Craig Truax	1967–1968	Raymond P. Shafer
	Joseph J. Kelley	1968–1971	Raymond P. Shafer
	C. Delores Tucker	1971–1977	Milton Shapp
	James D. Golden (acting)	1977	Milton Shapp
	Barton Fields	1977–1979	Milton Shapp
	Ethel D. Allen	1979	Dick Thornburgh
	William R. Davis	1979–1985	Dick Thornburgh
	Richard E. Anderson	1985	Dick Thornburgh
	Robert A Gleason, Jr.	1985–1987	Dick Thornburgh
	James J. Haggerty	1987–1989	Bob Casey Sr.
	Christopher A. Lewis	1989–1991	Bob Casey Sr.
	Brenda K. Mitchell	1992–1994	Bob Casey Sr.
	Robert N. Grant	1994–1995	Bob Casey Sr.
	Yvette Kane	1995–1998	Tom Ridge
	Kim Pizzingrilli	1999–2002	Tom Ridge
	C. Michael Weaver	2002–2003	Mark Schweiker
	Pedro Cortés	2003–2010	Ed Rendell
	Basil L. Merenda	2010–2011	Ed Rendell
	Carol Aichele	2011–2015	Tom Corbett
	Pedro Cortés	2015–2017	Tom Wolf
	Robert Torres	2017–2019	Tom Wolf
	Kathy Boockvar	2019–2021	Tom Wolf
	Veronica Degraffenreid (acting)	2021–2022	Tom Wolf
	Leigh M. Chapman (acting)	2022–2023	Tom Wolf
	Al Schmidt	2023–present	Josh Shapiro

== See also ==
- List of company registers
