= Jim Schultz =

American lawyer and corporate executive (born 1972)

Personal details
- Born: James David Schultz; July 7, 1972 (age 54) Atlantic City, New Jersey, U.S.
- Party: Republican
- Children: 2
- Education: Temple University (BA); Widener University (JD)

James David Schultz (born July 7, 1972) is an American lawyer and corporate executive who serves as the chairman of the Delaware River Port Authority (DRPA) and the executive vice president of Global Legal and Public Policy at Scientific Games in Enterprise, Nevada. He previously held the position of associate White House Counsel under President Donald Trump from 2017 to 2018. Schultz contributed to the legal teams for the 2016 Republican National Convention and the first Trump Transition Team.

== Early life and education ==
Schultz was born in Atlantic City, New Jersey and grew up in Galloway Township, New Jersey. He graduated from Temple University in Philadelphia in 1995 and earned a J.D. degree in 1998 at Widener University Commonwealth Law School in Harrisburg, Pennsylvania.

While in law school, Schultz was a student law clerk for the Honorable Thomas G. Saylor of the Supreme Court of Pennsylvania. Immediately after law school, he served as a law clerk to the late Honorable Vincent A. Cirillo, President Judge Emeritus of the Superior Court of Pennsylvania.

== Career ==
=== Government service ===
- U.S. Attorney's Office in the United States District Court for the Eastern District of Pennsylvania: Schultz served as a senior aide to the U.S. Attorney, focusing on public policy initiatives and liaising with various government and law enforcement entities.
- George W. Bush 2004 presidential campaign: He was the regional field director for the 2004 Bush-Cheney presidential campaign.

General Counsel (2012-2014): Schultz was the general Counsel for Pennsylvania Governor Tom Corbett. During that time, he provided legal advice on government contracting, procurement, trade, transportation, and infrastructure.

- Senior Associate Counsel and Special Assistant to the President of the United States in the Office of White House Counsel (2017)
  - Liaised with the United States Department of Transportation (DOT) and the General Services Administration (GSA).
  - Played a role in drafting and reviewing executive orders
  - Participated in the selection process for United States Attorneys and federal judges
  - Served as a White House ethics official, advising on compliance issues related to various acts (Ethics Act, Hatch Act, STOCK Act, etc.)
  - Donated to the presidential transition team
  - Served on the legal team for the 2016 Republican National Convention

=== State and local politics ===
Governor's Office, Pennsylvania (July 2012-November 2014): Schultz served as general counsel to Governor Tom Corbett, managing a legal team of nearly 500 lawyers. Working in the role encompassed providing legal advice on major procurements, transactions, litigation, legislation, and regulations for the Governor's administration and various Commonwealth agencies. His work covered several areas: agriculture, finance, education, energy, environment, healthcare, labor, municipal finance, pensions, taxation, and transportation. Additionally, he oversaw internal investigations and state agency interactions with the federal government on legal matters.

In November 2017, Schultz returned to Cozen and O'Connor, a Philadelphia-based law firm. He said that he had always planned to leave the White House before the end of the year and had agreed to those terms with White House Counsel Don McGahn when he began working. In September 2020, he left Cozen and O'Connor to lead the Local Government Advocacy Team for the Northeast Region in the Philadelphia and Washington, D.C. offices of Holland & Knight, a law firm. On June 27, 2019, James Schultz wrote an op-ed which criticized DA Larry Krasner's "Reforms" calling out rising gun-related violent crime in Philadelphia and claiming that the DA's primary goal is releasing criminals rather than prosecuting them. In February 2020, Schultz wrote a piece for CNN which supported Bill Barr's belief that the seven to nine years sentencing recommendation for Roger Stone was a ridiculous overreach, calling it "unfair and unjust," and that Barr was right. It was Barr's duty to insert himself in the process. On June 20, 2020, along with Sean Carter, a partner with Cozen O'Connor and co-chair of the Plaintiffs Executive Committee in the September 11 attacks lawsuit against the government of Saudi Arabia, Schultz wrote an op-ed calling on China to be held accountable for COVID-19's destruction. On August 29, 2022, Schultz wrote an op-ed for Philadelphia, a magazine. In the article he supported Josh Shapiro; he was one of the Republicans to endorse Shapiro. In the piece, Schultz dismissed GOP nominee Doug Mastriano as "pushing anti-American rhetoric and conspiracy theories".

In November 2022, he was appointed to the transition team for Pennsylvania Governor-elect Josh Shapiro. In December 2022, Scientific Games appointed Schultz as the executive vice president of Global Public Policy and Government Affairs. He led the company's government affairs, public policy, and advocacy efforts aiming to support Scientific Games' global business expansion and solidify the company's position as a preferred partner for government lotteries worldwide. Schultz contributed to maximizing proceeds directed toward lottery beneficiary programs in this role.

In November 2023, Schultz was appointed to Mayor Elect Cherelle-Parker's transition team, which serves under the 2026 Preparation subcommittee for Philadelphia's 250th Anniversary in 2026. In February 2024, Schultz became the chairman of the bi-state Delaware River Port Authority (DRPA). The agency is in charge of toll bridges and transit rail lines connecting Camden County, New Jersey and Philadelphia. Schultz, who was appointed by Shapiro, aims to maintain and expand DRPA's services while prioritizing stewardship of its infrastructure. Schultz intends to boost ridership on the PATCO Speedline, especially in the post-COVID era. As chairman, he oversees an agency with an annual operating budget of $188.6 million and a five-year capital budget of $794.2 million. The agency employs approximately 850 staff members. In March 2024, Schultz was named to head the Unified Legal and Public Policy Team at Scientific Games. He said the goal of the new department would be to maximize the services of the new department to benefit their government partners.

=== Media appearances ===
Since leaving the White House, Schultz has become a regular commentator on CNN's Anderson Cooper 360°. He advised Senate candidate David McCormick in the 2022 United States Senate election in Pennsylvania.

== Personal life ==
Jim Schultz got engaged to Marie Accardi on June 28th, 2025.

== Board memberships ==
- Delaware River Port Authority, Board of Commissioners, 2024–Present
- Rosemont College , Board of Trustees, 2022–Present
- Visit Philadelphia, Board of Directors, 2020–Present
- The Pennsylvania Society, Board of Councilors, 2019–Present
- International Council of Shopping Centers Political Action Committee (ICSC PAC), Co-Chair, Advocacy Subcommittee, 2019–Present
- Philadelphia Shipyard Development Corporation, Board of Directors, 2019–Present
- Rosemont College, Board of Trustees, 2018–Present
- Philadelphia Freedom Valley YMCA, Board of Directors, 2015-2017
- Drexel University President's Leadership Council, Board of Directors, 2015-2017
- Pennsylvania Legal Aid Network, Board of Directors, 2015-2017
- Steward's Alliance of the Archdiocese of Philadelphia, Executive Committee Chairman
- Christian Street YMCA, Executive Committee, 2008-2011
- Athletic Advantage Fund, Founding Member, 2003-2011
