= Al Schmidt =

American politician (born 1972)

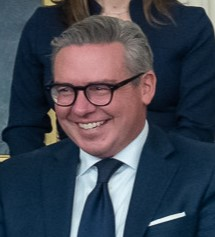
- Schmidt in 2023

Secretary of the Commonwealth of Pennsylvania
- Incumbent
- Assumed office January 17, 2023; Acting: January 17, 2023 – June 29, 2023
- Governor: Josh Shapiro
- Preceded by: Leigh M. Chapman (acting)

City Commissioner of Philadelphia
- In office January 2, 2012 – January 2, 2022
- Preceded by: Joseph Duda
- Succeeded by: Seth Bluestein

Personal details
- Born: c. 1972 Pittsburgh, Pennsylvania, U.S.
- Party: Republican
- Spouse: Erin
- Children: 3
- Education: Allegheny College (BA); Brandeis University (MA, PhD)
- Awards: Presidential Citizens Medal (2023)

Albert Schmidt (born c. 1972) is an American politician serving as the secretary of the Commonwealth of Pennsylvania since 2023. A member of the Republican Party, he was a Philadelphia city commissioner from 2012 to 2022.

Schmidt refused to cooperate with efforts to overturn the 2020 presidential election, which led him to be publicly attacked by then-president Donald Trump on Twitter. Schmidt provided testimony before the January 6 Committee in 2022. He was chosen to serve as secretary of the Commonwealth by Governor Josh Shapiro.

== Early life and background ==
A native of Pittsburgh, Pennsylvania, Schmidt graduated from Allegheny College with a Bachelor of Arts in history, and from Brandeis University with a Doctor of Philosophy in history. He served as an analyst for the Presidential Advisory Commission on Holocaust Assets in the United States (1999-2001) and the Government Accountability Office (2001-2006).

== Political career ==
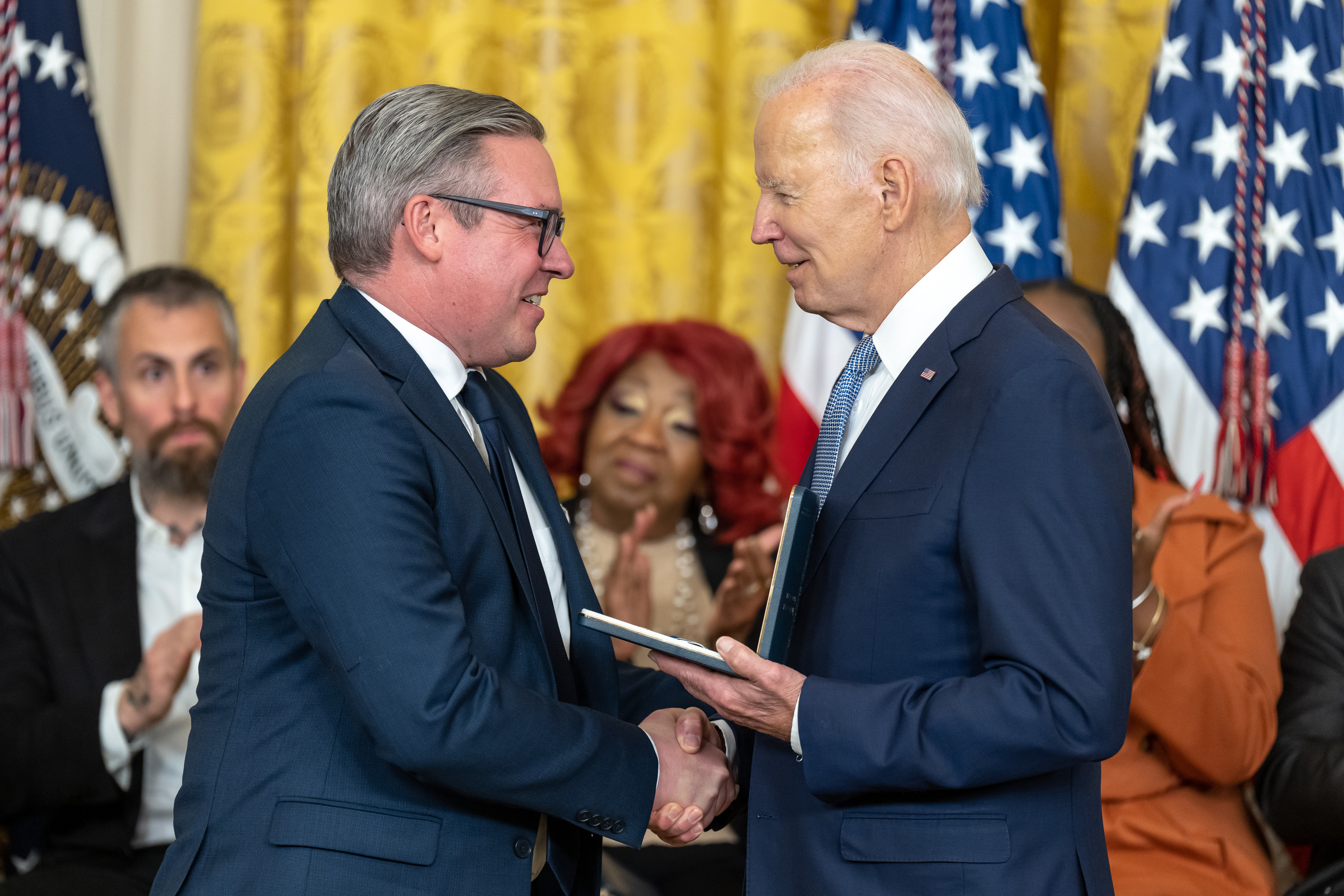
Schmidt receives the Presidential Citizens Medal from president Joe Biden in January 2023

Schmidt moved to Philadelphia in 2005, and served as executive director of the Philadelphia Republican City Committee before stepping down in 2009 for an unsuccessful run for City controller against Democratic incumbent Alan Butkovitz.

=== City Commissioner ===
Schmidt was first elected as a Philadelphia city commissioner in 2011, becoming the only Republican on the three-member municipal election board by winning the one seat reserved for a member who is not part of the majority political party in Philadelphia after he defeated the incumbent minority commissioner, Joseph Duda. He was re-elected in 2015 and 2019.

Schmidt refused to cooperate with the attempts to overturn the 2020 United States presidential election by publicly refuting claims of voter fraud and resisting calls from within his own party to stop counting mail-in ballots. He called some of president Donald Trump's claims "fantastical" and "completely ridiculous allegations that have no basis in fact at all."

On November 11, 2020, Trump directly attacked Schmidt on Twitter by claiming he "refuses to look at a mountain of corruption & dishonesty" in Philadelphia. After Trump's tweet, Schmidt testified that "my wife and I received threats that named our children, included my home address and images of my home, and threated [sic] to put their 'heads on spikes.'"

In late November 2021, Schmidt announced he would resign as a City Commissioner to become president and CEO of the Committee of Seventy, a nonpartisan, pro-democracy Philadelphia-based nonprofit group. On June 13, 2022, Schmidt testified before the January 6 Committee, detailing the threats against him and his family as well as addressing claims of voter fraud in Philadelphia during the 2020 election.

=== Secretary of the Commonwealth ===
On January 5, 2023, Schmidt was named by governor-elect Josh Shapiro as the secretary-designate of the Commonwealth of Pennsylvania. The following day, on January 6, 2023, Schmidt was awarded the Presidential Citizens Medal by president Joe Biden for demonstrating "courage and selflessness" in opposing efforts to overturn the 2020 election as a city commissioner. Schmidt automatically became full Secretary on June 29 after the Pennsylvania State Senate failed to act within the constitutionally prescribed 25-legislative-day period to confirm his nomination.

In January 2024, Schmidt ordered a court-appointed special master to demand $711,000 in legal reimbursements from the government of Fulton County stemming from a case where Fulton County's Republican commissioners improperly allowed a Trump-affiliated lawyer access to the county's voting machines in order to aid the attempted reversal of Trump's defeat in Pennsylvania.

In February 2024, Shapiro tapped Schmidt to head Pennsylvania's Election Threats Task Force. Ahead of the 2024 elections, the newly created task force operated as a collaborative effort between both federal and state law enforcement and administration officials working to combat election misinformation and threats against election workers.

Political offices
Preceded by Leigh M. Chapman; Acting	Secretary of the Commonwealth of Pennsylvania; 2023–present	Incumbent
