= Pennsylvania Department of State =

Government agency of Pennsylvania, US

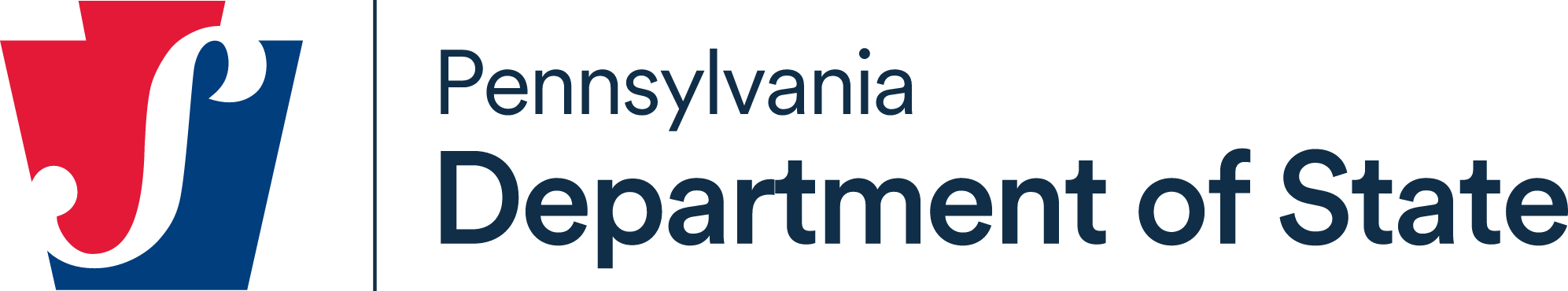

Agency overview
- Formed: 1919
- Jurisdiction: State government of Pennsylvania
- Headquarters: 302 North Office Building, 401 North Street, Harrisburg, Pennsylvania 17120
- Agency executive: Al Schmidt, Secretary of the Commonwealth of Pennsylvania
- Website: www.dos.pa.gov

The Pennsylvania Department of State is a cabinet-level state agency in the Commonwealth of Pennsylvania. The department is headed by the secretary of the Commonwealth of Pennsylvania.

== Responsibilities ==
- Campaign finance reporting
- Charities
- Corporations
- Professional Licenses
- Commissions
- Elections
- Legislation
- Statewide Uniform Registry of Electors (SURE)
- Lobbying disclosure
- Notaries

== See also ==
- Government of Pennsylvania
- List of Pennsylvania state agencies
