= Senator Leader =

Senator Leader may refer to:

- George M. Leader (1918–2013), Pennsylvania State Senate
- Guy Leader (1887–1978), Pennsylvania State Senate
