= Black Fury =

Black Fury may refer to:

- Black Fury (film), a 1935 American crime film starring Paul Muni
- Black Fury (novel), an historical novel by Michael Musmanno
- Black Fury, a character in Fantastic Comics
- Black Fury, a Fox Feature Syndicate comic book character

== See also ==
- Miss Fury, a comic book character also known as Black Fury
