= Frank Truscott =

American attorney (1894–1969)

Attorney General of Pennsylvania
- In office October 13, 1953 – January 18, 1955
- Governor: John Fine
- Preceded by: Robert Woodside
- Succeeded by: Herbert Cohen

Personal details
- Born: Frank F. Truscott; October 2, 1894; Stroudsburg, Pennsylvania, U.S.
- Died: December 1969 (aged 75); Newtown Square, Pennsylvania, U.S.
- Political party: Republican

Frank F. Truscott (October 2, 1894 – December 1969) was an American attorney. He was an Attorney General of Pennsylvania and candidate for Lieutenant Governor of Pennsylvania. He was born to a wealthy horse breeding family and long considered himself to be a gentleman farmer. He graduated with a law degree from Lafayette College in 1917. He was the longtime City Solicitor of Philadelphia and a key fixture in the last days of the city's dying Republican machine; he ran unsuccessfully for Congress in 1940. In 1953, he was appointed to fill a vacancy in the attorney general's office; he did not run for a full term, but instead sought the position of lieutenant governor in 1954. From 1953 to 1969, he was a trustee of his alma mater, Lafayette College.

Truscott was an outspoken opponent of Communism. He was involved in the circulation of a McCarthyist loyalty oath while serving as attorney general. In 1956, he was a prosecutor on the case against communist organizer Steve Nelson.

Legal offices
Preceded by Robert Woodside	Attorney General of Pennsylvania; 1953–1955	Succeeded by Herbert Cohen
Party political offices
Preceded by Lloyd Wood	Republican nominee for Lieutenant Governor of Pennsylvania; 1954	Succeeded by John Walker
