= 1954 Pennsylvania gubernatorial election =

- November 2, 1954
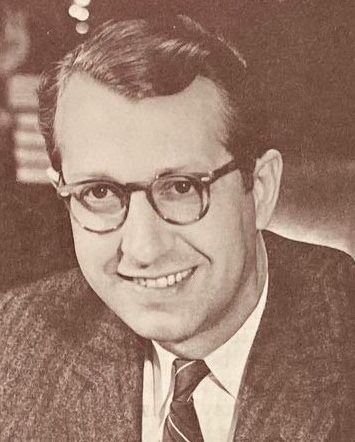

| Nominee | George M. Leader | Lloyd Wood |
| Party | Democratic | Republican |
| Running mate | Roy Furman | Frank Truscott |
| Popular vote | 1,996,266 | 1,717,070 |
| Percentage | 53.66% | 46.15% |
- County results Leader: 50–60% 60–70% Wood: 40–50% 50–60% 60–70%
Governor before election
John Fine
Republican
Elected Governor
George Leader
Democratic

The 1954 Pennsylvania gubernatorial election was held on November 2. In what is considered a crucial realigning election for the state, Democratic State Senator George M. Leader defeated Republican incumbent Lieutenant Governor Lloyd Wood, becoming the first Democrat to be elected governor since 1934.

== Background ==
Entering the 1954 campaign, Democrats had a dismal record in state politics, winning the governorship only three times in 24 elections; the party's stock had languished for fifteen years since the damaging administration of George Earle in the late 1930s.

== Democratic primary ==
=== Candidates ===
- George M. Leader, State Senator from York County
- William "Doc" McClelland, Allegheny County coroner
- Charles J. Schmitt, real estate operator from Girard

=== Campaign ===
Leader was viewed as another mediocre if idealistic Democratic candidate, who had gained some statewide recognition for refusing to sign a loyalty oath circulated in the legislature at the height of the Second Red Scare. However, Leader was embraced by the growing reform wing of the party, of which Leader's father had been a member during his own tenure in the State Senate. A longstanding regional divide continued to haunt the Democrats in their primary, William "Doc" McClellan, a former Republican and vocal critic of organizational leadership, gave Leader a strong run for the nomination. Despite having only local name recognition, McClelland's sweep of heavily Democratic Western Pennsylvania allowed him to come nearly within 60,000 votes of an upset.

=== Results ===
Democratic primary results Leader: 30%–40%; 40%–50%; 50%–60%; 60%–70%; 70%–80%; 80%–90%; 90%–100%; McClelland: 40%–50%; 50%–60%; 60%–70%; 70%–80%

Pennsylvania gubernatorial Democratic primary election, 1954
| Party | Candidate | Votes | % |
|---|---|---|---|
| Democratic | George M. Leader | 306,688 | 52.75 |
| Democratic | William D. McClelland | 241,226 | 41.49 |
| Democratic | Charles J. Schmitt | 33,521 | 5.76 |
| Total votes | | 581,435 | 100.00 |

== Republican primary ==
=== Candidates ===
- Lloyd Wood, incumbent Lieutenant Governor of Pennsylvania
- Thomas S. Stephenson, president of the Pennsylvania Home Rule Association
- Gordon F. Chamberlin, farmer and miner from Northumberland County

=== Results ===
Republican primary results Wood: 40%–50%; 50%–60%; 60%–70%; 70%–80%; 80%–90%; 90%–100%; Stephenson: 50%–60%; 70%–80%

Pennsylvania gubernatorial Republican primary election, 1954
| Party | Candidate | Votes | % |
|---|---|---|---|
| Republican | Lloyd Wood | 707,133 | 73.99 |
| Republican | Thomas S. Stephenson | 182,977 | 19.15 |
| Republican | Gordon F. Chamberlin | 65,554 | 6.86 |
| Total votes | | 955,664 | 100.00 |

== General election ==
=== Candidates ===
- Henry Beitscher (Progressive)
  - running mate: Alex Wright
- Louis Dirle (Socialist Workers)
  - running mate: Frank Knotek
- George M. Leader, State Senator (from York County) (Democratic)
  - running mate: Roy Furman, former Speaker of the State House of Representatives (from Greene County)
- Lloyd Wood, Lieutenant Governor (from Montgomery County) (Republican)
  - running mate: Frank Truscott, Attorney General (from Montgomery County)

=== Campaign ===
Republicans entered the race firmly unified behind Wood, but facing the deep unpopularity of their outgoing Governor Fine, whose administration had been embroiled in several scandals and who had led the push for a much criticized new sales tax. Furthermore, a huge rift had opened in the party between the middle class-backed progressive and big business-supported conservative wings of the party. A national recession, which pushed Pennsylvania's unemployment rate to the highest in the nation also worked against Republican hopes of keeping their grasp on the governor's mansion.

After his close call in the primary, Leader ran an energetic campaign, travelling across the state and actively engaging citizens at rallies. In the first gubernatorial campaign where a significant portion of the population owned televisions, Leader ran a series of speeches where he captured audiences with his charismatic appearances; conversely, Lloyd appeared too sluggish in his campaign, and the media chastised his television appearances as "terrible." Perhaps the most important factor in the race was Leader's own principled character and his commitment for reducing the presence of patronage that had long given state government a bad name; for this attitude, he earned the nickname Mr. Clean.

Leader performed not only well in the Democratic strongholds of Philadelphia, Pittsburgh, and Scranton, but won 34 of the state's 67 counties. His impressive win included capturing victories in many GOP strongholds. He captured over 60% in his home of York County, and becoming one of the only Democratic candidates for any major statewide office to take the state's rural, conservative center.

== Results ==
Pennsylvania gubernatorial election, 1954
| Party | Candidate | Running mate | Votes | Percentage |
|---|---|---|---|---|
| Democratic | George Leader | Roy Furman | 1,996,266 | 53.66% |
| Republican | Lloyd Wood | Frank Truscott | 1,717,070 | 46.15% |
| Progressive | Henry Beitscher | Alex Wright | 4,471 | 0.12% |
| Socialist Workers Party | Louis Dirle | Frank Knotek | 2,650 | 0.07% |
| Totals | | | 3,720,457 | 100.00% |
