= Andrew Bradley =

Andrew Bradley may refer to:

- A. C. Bradley (Andrew Cecil Bradley, 1851–1935), English literary scholar
- Andrew Coyle Bradley (1844–1902), US federal judge
- Andrew M. Bradley (1906–1983), American cabinet secretary in the Commonwealth of Pennsylvania
- Quro, born Andrew Bradley, Australian hip hop MC from Adelaide, South Australia
