= George M. Leader =

American politician

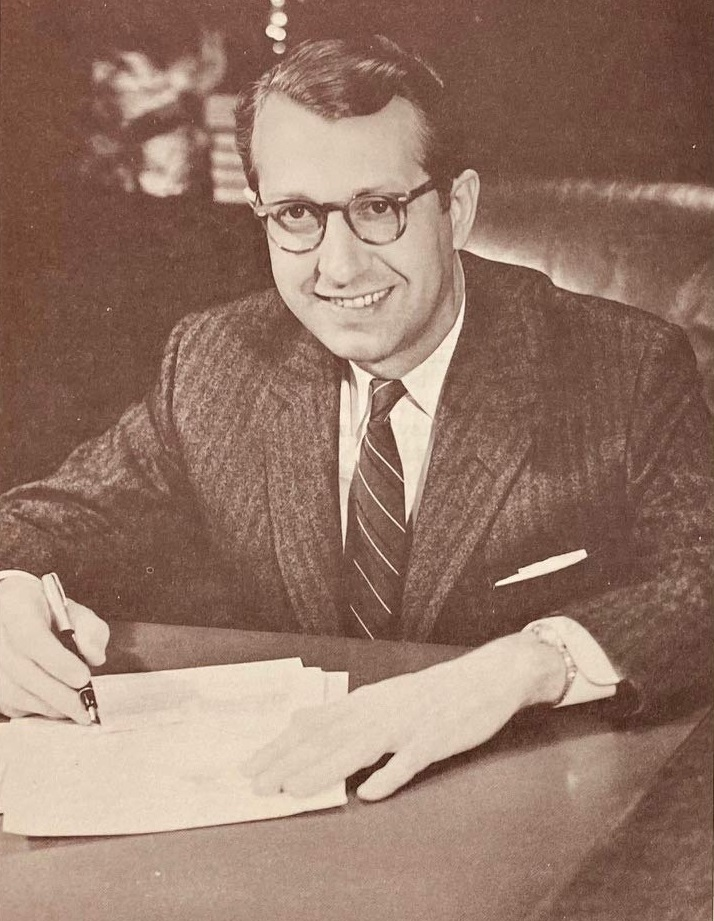
- Leader's official photo, circa 1959. Used for display in state buildings and for other purposes.

36th Governor of Pennsylvania
- In office January 18, 1955 – January 20, 1959
- Lieutenant: Roy Furman
- Preceded by: John Fine
- Succeeded by: David Lawrence

Member of the Pennsylvania Senate from the 28th district
- In office January 2, 1951 – November 30, 1954
- Preceded by: Guy Leader
- Succeeded by: Harry E. Seyler

Personal details
- Born: George Michael Leader; January 17, 1918 York, Pennsylvania, U.S.
- Died: May 9, 2013 (aged 95) Hershey, Pennsylvania, U.S.
- Party: Democratic
- Spouse: Mary Jane Strickler (m. 1939; died 2011)
- Education: Gettysburg College; University of Pennsylvania
- Occupation: Chicken hatchery operator

George Michael Leader (January 17, 1918 – May 9, 2013) was an American politician. He served as the 36th governor of Pennsylvania from January 18, 1955, until January 20, 1959. He was a member of the Democratic Party, and a native of York County, Pennsylvania. He was the only person from that county ever to be elected governor of the state until the election of Tom Wolf in 2014.

== Early life ==
George Leader was the third child of Guy and Beulah Leader. He grew up on their York County poultry farm, and was educated in a one-room schoolhouse. He later graduated from York High School, then attended Gettysburg College, in Gettysburg, Pennsylvania, where he was a member of Tau Kappa Epsilon fraternity, before transferring to the University of Pennsylvania from which he received an undergraduate degree. He did graduate work at the University of Pennsylvania, with a focus on philosophy, politics, and economics. Leader received an MGA from the Fels Institute of Government at the University of Pennsylvania. In 1939, he married Mary Jane Strickler, and, during World War II, he served on an aircraft carrier in the Pacific Theater.

== Career ==
Following the war, Leader began a family-operated chicken hatchery, and served in leadership positions in the York County Democratic Party. He successfully ran for Pennsylvania State Senate in 1950, winning the 28th district seat previously held by his father, Guy. In 1952, he ran for State Treasurer of Pennsylvania. Despite narrowly losing that race, he built name recognition for himself that would be useful for any future run for statewide office.

Leader utilized this name recognition to run for governor in 1954. The Republicans had a large edge in voter registration in Pennsylvania at this time, and no Democrat had been elected governor since 1934. Despite these disadvantages, Leader picked up substantial support from labor and agricultural interests, and managed to defeat Lt. Governor Lloyd Wood, the Republican nominee, by 280,000 votes. Sworn in on January 18, 1955, one day after turning 37, he was the second youngest person ever to be elected to the post.

During his administration, Leader initiated programs to deal with Pennsylvania's lackluster economy and its substantial budget deficit. Shortly after taking office, in June 1955 he signed legislation that authorized the construction of a Curtiss-Wright research facility at Quehanna, in Clearfield County; the Sanitary Water Board also issued a permit for the discharge of radioactive waste into Mosquito Creek and the Atomic Energy Commission issued a twenty-year license to operate a four megawatt nuclear reactor. He also increased funding to education, engaged in a highly publicized campaign to reform Pennsylvania's state mental hospitals, and carved out a role for the state in protecting the civil rights of African-Americans and other minorities. He appointed Andrew M. Bradley as the first African American to serve in a Cabinet-level position in Pennsylvania. As governor, Leader unsuccessfully attempted to create a graduated income tax.

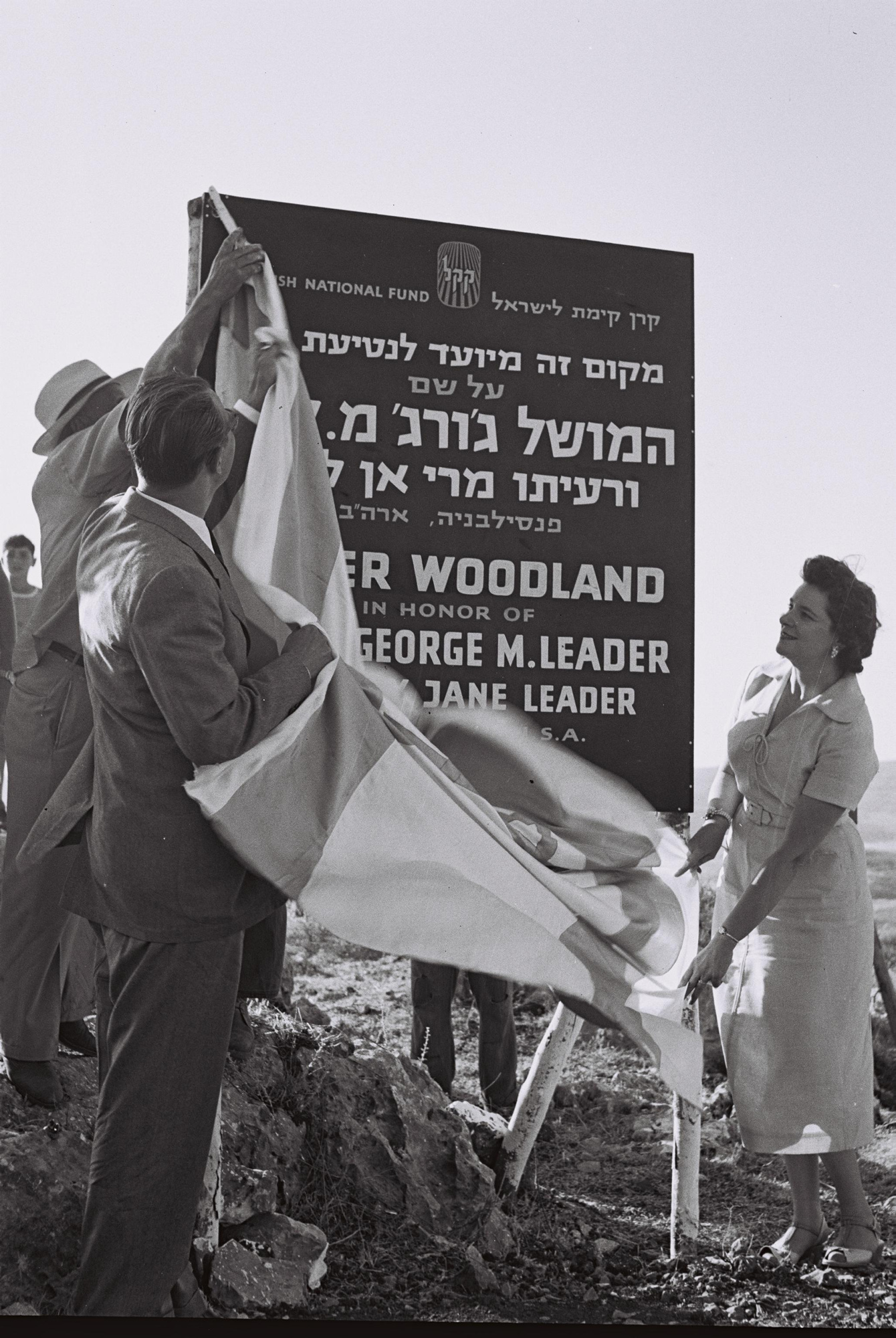
George Leader and his wife plaque marking the planting of woodland in their honour, Kiryat Moshe, Jerusalem 1956

Leader was unable to run for re-election in 1958 because the Pennsylvania Constitution that was in place at that time term limited governors to a single four-year term. Instead, he opted to run that year for a seat in the Senate, a race which he lost to Republican Congressman Hugh Scott.

== Later life and death ==
Although Leader never again sought elected office following his 1958 defeat, he stayed active in Democratic politics and had spoken out on a number of issues. He and his family established Country Meadows and Providence Place Retirement communities in the 1980s and 90s, and resided in Hummelstown, Pennsylvania. Leader remained active in operating the non-profit Providence Place Retirement Communities, while his family operated Country Meadows facilities. Country Meadows' CEO is Leader's son G. Michael Leader, COO is son David Leader, and CFO is son-in-law Ted Janeczek. Mary Jane Leader died March 15, 2011, due to chronic obstructive pulmonary disease.

Upon the death of former Delaware governor Elbert Carvel in 2005, Leader became the earliest serving US governor of any state still living until his death in 2013.

Leader died on May 9, 2013, in Hershey, Pennsylvania, at the age of 95 at Country Meadows Retirement Community, which he founded. He was the last living American governor of a U.S. state who left office in the 1950s.

Pennsylvania State Senate
Preceded by Guy Leader	Member of the Pennsylvania Senate from the 28th district 1951–1954	Succeeded by Harry E. Seyler
Party political offices
Preceded by W. J. Lane	Democratic nominee for Treasurer of Pennsylvania; 1952	Succeeded by James W. Knox
Preceded by Richardson Dilworth	Democratic nominee for Governor of Pennsylvania; 1954	Succeeded by David L. Lawrence
Preceded by Guy K. Bard	Democratic nominee for US Senator from Pennsylvania (Class 1); 1958	Succeeded by Genevieve Blatt
Political offices
Preceded by John S. Fine	Governor of Pennsylvania; 1955–1959	Succeeded by David L. Lawrence
Honorary titles
Preceded by Elbert N. Carvel	Earliest Serving Governor still living 2005–2013	Succeeded by Mike Stepovich
