= Robert E. Woodside =

American politician

Robert E. Woodside, Jr.
- Circa 1951

Justice of the Pennsylvania Superior Court
- In office 1953–1965

Pennsylvania Attorney General
- In office March 7, 1951 – October 1, 1953
- Governor: John S. Fine
- Preceded by: Charles J. Margiotti
- Succeeded by: Frank Truscott

Pennsylvania House of Representatives
- In office 1933–1941

Personal details
- Born: June 4, 1904 Millersburg, Dauphin County, Pennsylvania
- Died: March 18, 1998 (aged 93) Sun City, Maricopa County, Arizona
- Party: Republican
- Spouse: F. Fairlee Habbart
- Children: 3
- Education: Dickinson College

Robert Elmer Woodside, Jr. (June 4, 1904 – March 18, 1998) was an American politician and judge. He served four terms as a member of the Pennsylvania House of Representatives, one term as Attorney General, and one term on the Superior Court.

== Early life ==
Woodside was born in Millersburg, Pennsylvania, the son of Robert E. and Ella Neitz Woodside. He attended Dickinson College, where he was a member of the Raven's Claw Society, graduating in 1926. He received a law degree from Dickinson School of Law in 1928. He married F. Fairlee Habbart in 1931, and they had three children.

== Political career ==
=== Early political career ===
He was first elected to the State House of Representatives in 1932 and served four terms, until 1941. From 1939 to 1941, he was Republican Floor Leader. He was then appointed a judge on the Dauphin County Court of Common Pleas, where he served until he was appointed state Attorney General in 1951. He was appointed in 1953 to fill a vacancy on the state Superior Court. He was elected to a full ten-year term in 1954 and lost his 1964 bid for re-election.

=== Slot machine raids ===
Slot machines were illegal in Pennsylvania under an 1805 law, prohibiting mechanical gambling devices. Still, slot machines were popular at political clubs as fundraisers.

In 1951, President Harry Truman signed legislation banning the interstate transportation of slot machines in violation of state law. Woodside, with Pennsylvania Governor John S. Fine's encouragement, undertook an enforcement campaign against the machines. The first state Attorney General to do so, Woodside sent the State Police on thousands of raids when local district attorneys refused to co-operate. Over 700 clubs folded after their slot machines had been destroyed. In Erie, the mayor, the police chief, and twelve others were found guilty in 1954 of bribery and conspiracy regarding the machines.

=== Later political career ===
Woodside was appointed in 1953 to fill a vacancy on the state Superior Court. He was elected to a full ten-year term in 1954 but lost his 1964 bid for re-election.

In 1962, Woodside had been drafted to run for state governor. US Senator Hugh Scott strongly opposed Woodside and ran in opposition but withdrew when party leaders backed William Scranton, then relatively unknown.

== Later career ==
Woodside was an adjunct professor at Dickinson School of Law (1970-1990). He was a partner in the law firm Mette, Evans & Woodside.

== Death ==
He died on vacation in Sun City, Arizona.

== Bibliography ==
- My Life and Town. Millersburg. 1979.
- Pennsylvania Constitutional Law. Sayre, Pa: Murelle Printing Company. 1985.

Legal offices
Preceded by Charles J. Margiotti	Attorney General of Pennsylvania; 1951–1953	Succeeded by Frank Truscott
