= John Barcoski =

American murder victim

- Born: December 15, 1889; Płock, Russian Empire (now Poland)
- Died: February 10, 1929 (aged 39); Imperial, Pennsylvania, U.S.
- Cause of death: Murder resulting from Blunt Force Trauma
- Occupation: Miner

John Barcoski (also spelled as Barkoski, Borkovski, or Barkowsky; December 15, 1889 – February 10, 1929) was a Polish émigré miner brutally beaten to death by Pennsylvania's Coal and Iron Police on February 10, 1929. His passing and subsequent acquittal of his murderers on the first-degree murder charges provoked public indignation, which eventually led to the end of Pennsylvania's private anti-labor Coal and Iron Police system.

== History ==
Barcoski immigrated to the United States in 1906. He was married to Sophia Blussick, a fellow Polish emigrant, and had four children, John Jr., Helen, Bertha, and Anthony. Anthony also became a miner and died of lung cancer at age 47. He was both a farmer and a union employee of the Pittsburgh Coal Company's Montour Mine #9 in McAdams, Pennsylvania. On the evening of the 9th, he went to his mother-in-law's home, and there encountered two private officers also employed by the Pittsburgh Coal Company. Eyewitnesses said one of them launched an unprovoked attack on Barcoski, who received a laceration of the left cheek, five or six head wounds, two broken ribs and a fractured nose. Later at police barracks over the course of four hours, according to trial testimony, a third officer beat Barcoski with a strap while he lay semiconscious on the floor, twisted his ears until the miner cried aloud, and twisted his broken nose until he lapsed again into unconsciousness. Then he beat Barcoski over the chest with a poker until the poker bent, straightened the implement and beat the man again. He stripped the miner to the waist in order to better use a strap and kicked Barcoski until the miner's body rolled over and over on the floor. The original attacker also beat Barcoski, kicked him, struck him over the head with knucklers, and slapped him on the arms, legs and neck with his blackjack. The next morning he was taken to a hospital where he died. A jury acquitted the three officers of murder.

Later, two of the police responsible for his death were found guilty of involuntary manslaughter, and his widow was paid $13,500 by the Pittsburgh Coal Company as compensation.

== Legacy ==
In the words of the Chicago Tribune, "it was the fatal beating of John Barcoski, a miner in the Pittsburgh district several years ago, that hastened the end of 'the system'." Researchers acknowledged the historical role of John Barcoski's slaying in the demise of Coal and Iron Police.

Pennsylvania state legislator and former miner Michael Musmanno was outraged by the case, and introduced a bill to banish this private police force. The bill was vetoed by the Republican governor John Stuchell Fisher, which led to Musmanno's resignation. Musmanno then published a short story about the case, entitled "Jan Volkanik," blending Barcoski's identity with a semi-legendary Polish coal mining figure. Fisher's successor, Gifford Pinchot, fatally crippled the private police forces by refusing to fund them or renew any of their state commissions, and the Coal and Iron Police officially ceased to exist in 1935.

That story in turn was basis for the 1935 film Black Fury starring Paul Muni and directed by Michael Curtiz. The film's subject matter was controversial. The executive secretary of the National Coal Association, D.J. Battle, attempted to stop production through political pressure. Its release was banned entirely in Chicago and several countries. The British Board of Film Censors deemed a speech describing the unfair relationship between the miners and union leaders as inflammatory, and ordered it removed.

In 1966, Musmanno published a novel version of the screenplay also named Black Fury.

== See also ==
- Murder of workers in labor disputes in the United States
