= Coal and Iron Police =

Private police force in Pennsylvania, US

The Coal and Iron Police (C&I) was a private police force in the US state of Pennsylvania that existed between 1865 and 1931. It was established by the Pennsylvania General Assembly but employed and paid for by the various coal companies. The Coal and Iron Police worked alongside the Pennsylvania National Guard, and later the Pennsylvania State Police, beginning in 1877. The remaining Coal and Iron Police commissions were allowed to expire in 1931, ostensibly ending the state-sanctioned organization of a private police force. Industrial policing continued in limited form until the later 1930s, when the National Labor Relations Act, the Fair Labor Standards Act, and other federal legislation made armed industrial forces illegal.

== Establishment ==
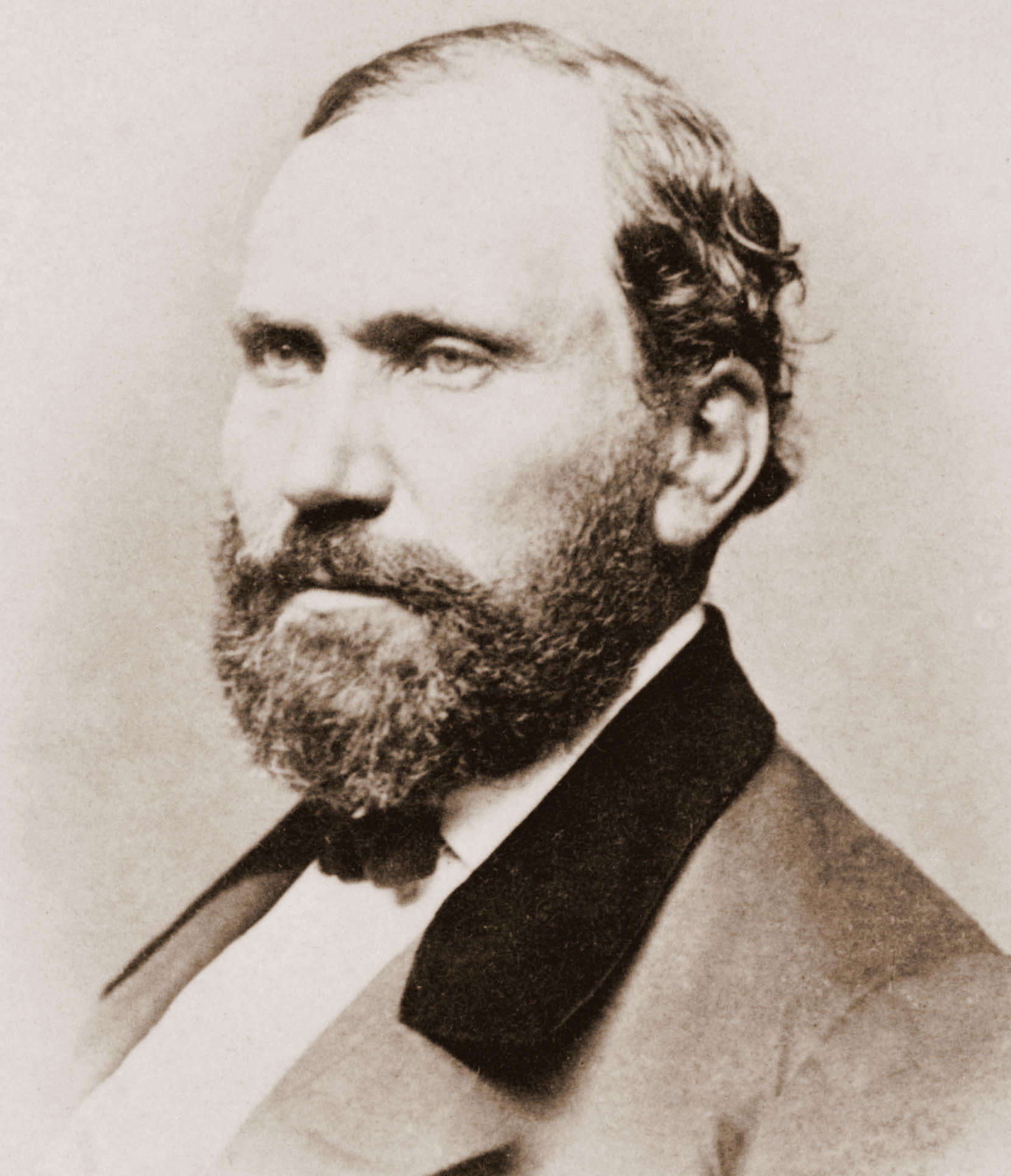
Allan Pinkerton, founder of the Pinkerton Detective Agency

Prior to 1865 (and until 1905), law enforcement in Pennsylvania existed only on the county level or below; an elected sheriff was the primary law enforcement officer (for each county). With the construction of the railroad, the Pennsylvania hinterlands were opened up to development. As mining and coal-powered industries like iron and steel manufacturing expanded, Coal, railroad and iron operators made the case that they required additional protection of their property. Thus the Pennsylvania State Legislature passed State Act 228. This empowered the railroads to organize private police forces. In 1866, a supplement to the act was passed extending the privilege to "embrace all corporations, firms, or individuals, owning, leasing, or being in possession of any colliery, furnace, or rolling mill within this commonwealth". The 1866 supplement also stipulated that the words "coal and iron police" appear on their badges. For one dollar each, the state sold to the mine and steel mill owners commissions conferring police power upon whoever the owners selected. A total of 7,632 commissions were given for the Coal and Iron Police. In 1871, Governor John White Geary instituted a $1 fee for each C&I commission. Prior to that, there was no cost associated with obtaining the legal right to hire a private policeman.

Although the Coal and Iron Police nominally existed solely to protect company property, in practice the companies used them as strikebreakers, and to coerce and discipline workers and their families. C&Is were sometimes used to crack down on unemployed miners and the families of miners' practice of "bootlegging" or picking up loose scraps of coal along the railways to sell or for use heating their homes. Many coal miners disdained the C&Is and called them "Cossacks" and "Yellow Dogs". Common gunmen, hoodlums, and adventurers were often hired to fill these commissions. They served their own interests and regularly abused their power.

The first Coal and Iron Police were established in Schuylkill County, Pennsylvania, under the supervision of the Pinkerton Detective Agency. Beginning in 1873, the Coal and Iron Police worked with the Pinkertons, particularly with a labor spy by the name of James McParland, to infiltrate and suppress supposed Molly Maguire activity in the coal fields. During McParland's undercover investigation, Allan Pinkerton pursued a dual-track strategy, appointing R.J. Linden as head of the local Coal and Iron Police. McParland's undercover work led to the arrest and execution of 20 suspected Molly Maguires, but not without complications. Carbon County judge John P. Lavelle later wrote that:

The Molly Maguire trials were a surrender of state sovereignty. A private corporation initiated the investigation through a private detective agency. A private police force arrested the alleged defenders, and private attorneys for the coal companies prosecuted them. The state provided only the courtroom and the gallows.

Violence continued throughout the investigation. Tamaqua police officer Benjamin Yost was murdered in 1875 and the Mollies were blamed. Later that year, an Irish family was murdered by gunmen under suspicious circumstances. The attack was thought to have been motivated by revenge for the alleged murder of mine boss Thomas Sanger by Charles Kehoe, a leader of the Mollies. Though the gunmen were never brought to trial, later evidence implicated Pinkerton, McParland, and Linden. Many in the Irish-American working class at the time, and some scholars today, question whether tales of the Molly Maguires were invented by the Pinkertons to justify repression in the anthracite coal fields. Many suspected Mollies maintained their innocence throughout the proceedings against them.

The Great Railroad Strike of 1877 led to increased public-private police cooperation, with Pennsylvania National Guard regiments and eventually federal troops deployed when Pinkertons and Coal and Iron Police failed to quell disorder on their own. The difficulties faced by Pennsylvania authorities in routing entrenched strikers led to reforms in the state's National Guard, and established a stronger role for the state in preserving order in industrial disputes.

On 16 March 1892 Coal and Iron police officer John Merget was shot and killed when he tried to stop three tramps from stealing from a boxcar; two suspects were convicted of second degree murder.

Coal and Iron Police again played a significant role in the 1892 Homestead Strike. As in 1877, The C&Is were overwhelmed by striking workers. They were herded together with the sheriff and local militia and sent away from town on a boat. The state's National Guard was again summoned to put down the strike.

In 1897, at least nineteen striking mineworkers were killed and dozens more were injured while marching to Lattimer, after a posse of deputies and company police fired on the unarmed crowd. The Lattimer Massacre bolstered sympathy and support for the miners' grievances and marked a turning point in the history of the United Mine Workers of America. None of the deputies or company police were convicted for the murder of the unarmed workers.

== Transition to state policing ==
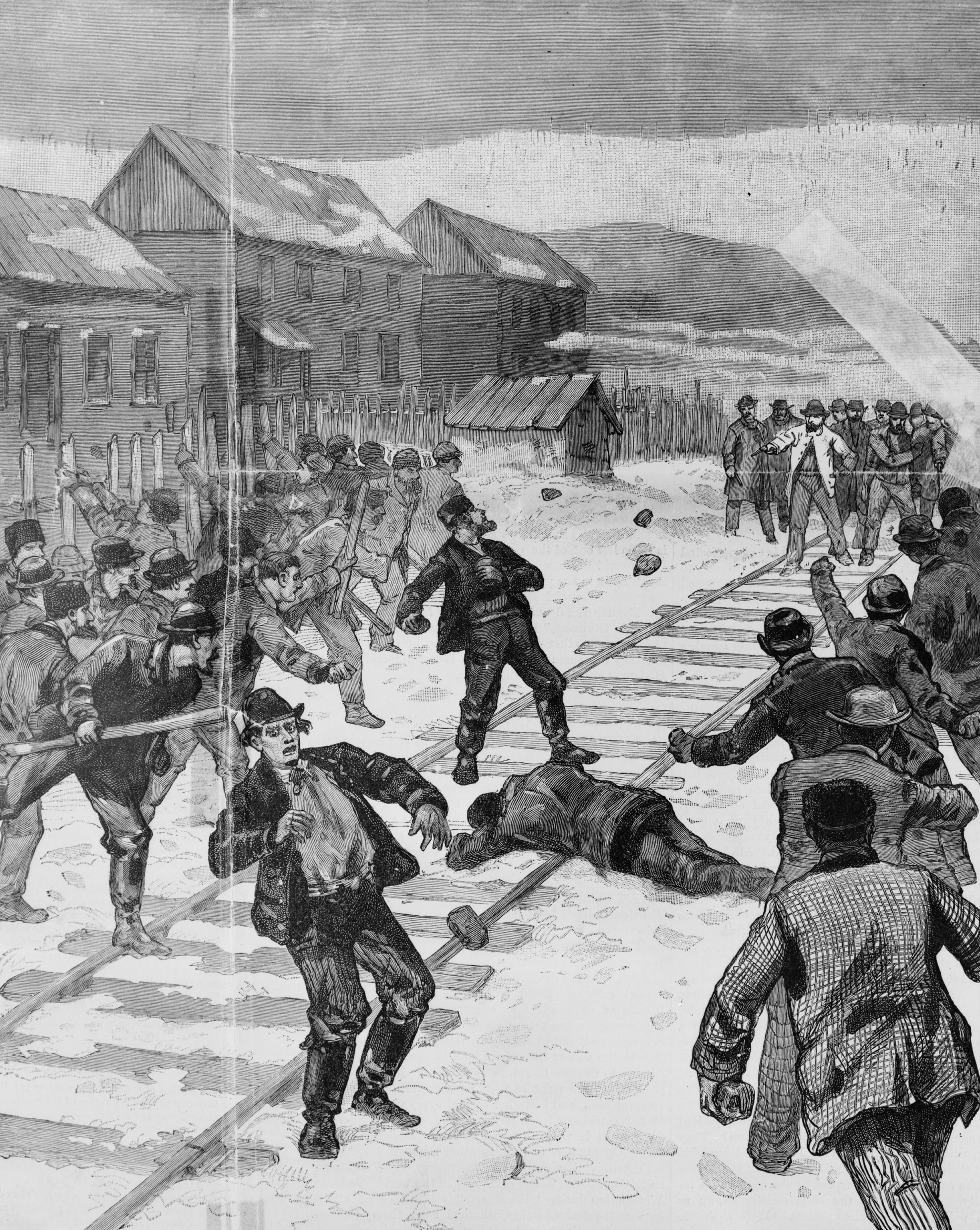
Attack on the Coal and Iron Police at Shenandoah

The end of the Coal and Iron Police began in 1902 during what became known as the Anthracite coal strike. It began May 15 and lasted until October 23. The strike led to violence throughout seven counties and caused a nationwide coal shortage, driving up the price of anthracite coal. The strike did not end until President Theodore Roosevelt intervened. In the aftermath of the strike, there was growing determination that peace and order should be maintained by regularly appointed and responsible officers employed by the public. In March of 1903, Roosevelt's coal commission recommended the abolition of the Coal and Iron Police.

Though the Roosevelt commission's recommendation was not heeded, it added to the public pressure which led to the formation of the Pennsylvania State Police on May 2, 1905, when Senate Bill 278 was signed into law by Governor Samuel W. Pennypacker. The stated purpose was to act as fire, forest, game and fish wardens, and to protect the farmers, but some observers felt that it really was to serve the interests of the coal and iron operators because the same legislation created a "trespassing offense" that wherever a warning sign was displayed a person could be arrested and fined ten dollars. This was seen as a direct assault on picketing.

The Coal and Iron Police continued to exist even after the establishment of the state police. The state police often collaborated with Coal and Iron Police to the benefit of industrial interests and the detriment of labor.

The Coal and Iron Police, most of the time, are on the scene, and when they start something it is because the thugs and the Coal and Iron Police are armed and the strikers are not armed, and are not permitted to be armed; and they are beaten up by the thugs, and that is about the time the constabulary appear on the scene, and they come around, mounted like cavalry, and they come around and see the disturbance, and they always take good care to arrest only the strikers.

— James H. Maurer, President of the Pennsylvania Federation of Labor

During the Westmoreland County coal strike of 1910–1911, the Pennsylvania State Police worked with the Coal and Iron Police to suppress the strike. Coal and Iron Police served as enforcers on company property during the workday, and state police harassed and surveilled the workers outside of company property and time. The two police forces worked together to evict a mostly Slovak workforce from company-owned homes, forcing the workers to spend the winter in tents provided by the UMWA. When the company imported strikebreakers to the region, many of whom had little to no English-speaking ability, the C&I corralled the workers in company housing complexes and forced them to work, even as some attempted to leave. Sixteen strikers and their wives were killed during the strike.

In August 1911 a Coal and Iron Policeman, Deputy Constable Edgar Rice of Coatesville, Pennsylvania, was shot and killed by Zachariah Walker; Walker was lynched by a mob a few days later.

In 1919, labor organizer Fannie Sellins was beaten and shot by Coal and Iron Police when she intervened to stop the beating of Joseph Starzleski, a mineworker. Both Sellins and Starzleski were killed.

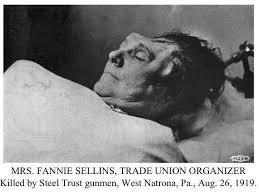
A photo of the crushed skull of Fannie Sellins

A July 25, 1922, article in the Johnstown Tribune noted that additional Coal and Iron Police were hired during the national coal miner's strike in 1922.

In February 1927 Coal and Iron Police officers Paul Fox and Lewis Knapp were killed in the line of duty after coming upon two suspects with illegal moonshine. One suspect was executed in 1929, and the other served 15 years in prison.

In 1929, Michael Musmanno, a Pennsylvania state legislator, fought to banish the Coal and Iron Police after they had beaten worker John Barcoski to death. The final disbandment was helped along by Musmanno's writing a short story based on the case, which was adapted into the 1935 film Black Fury. Decades later Musmanno released a novel of the same name.

In 1931, Governor Gifford Pinchot refused to renew or issue new private police commissions, thereby effectively ending the industrial police system in Pennsylvania. The reasons for his act are not clear and may have included political payback for his defeat in a 1926 campaign by a candidate from Indiana County who had the strong support of the coal and steel operators, as a political gesture to the rising labor movement of the 1930s, out of personal disgust with the excesses of the Coal and Iron Police, or some combination thereof. His official statement indicates the latter, in reference to an assault perpetrated by a couple of Iron Policemen.

The brutality of the Coal and Iron Police forms the background to some sections in Dos Passos's U.S.A. trilogy, focusing on miners' struggles and strikes in Pennsylvania. The Coal and Iron Police also feature in the Sherlock Holmes novel, The Valley of Fear, which is based loosely on the breaking of the Molly Maguires.

== See also ==
- State Police of Crawford and Erie Counties
- Auxiliary police
- Railroad police
- Security police
- Special police
- Company police
- Murder of workers in labor disputes in the United States
