= Hametown, Pennsylvania =

Unincorporated area in Pennsylvania, US

- Unincorporated community
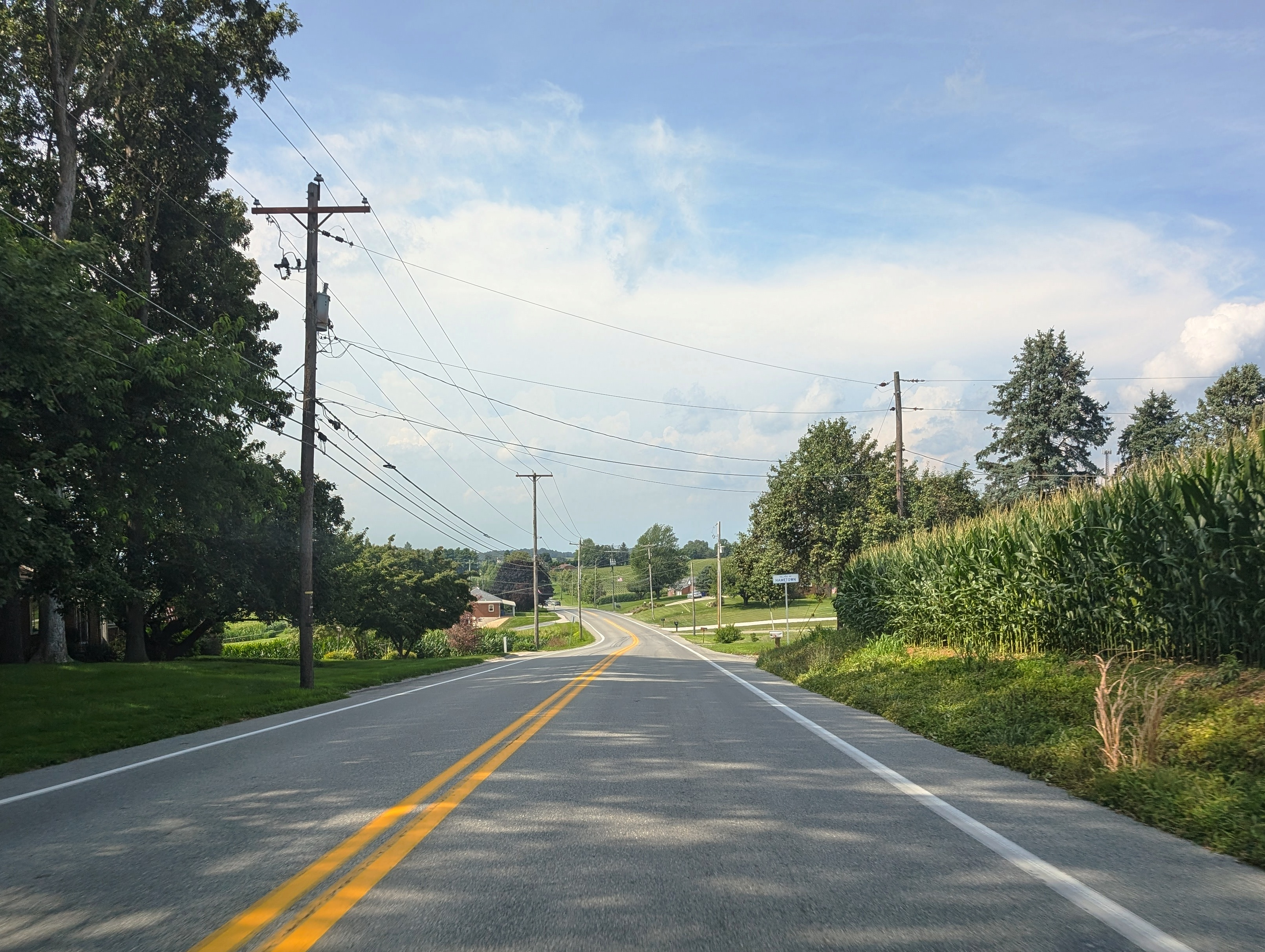
- Susquehanna Trail northbound entering Hametown

- Location within Pennsylvania
- Coordinates: 39°47′54″N 76°40′45″W
- Country: United States
- State: Pennsylvania
- County: York
- Elevation: 932 ft (284 m)
- Time zone: UTC-5 (Eastern (EST))
  - Summer (DST): UTC-4 (EDT)
- Area code: 717
- GNIS feature ID: 1203744

Hametown is an unincorporated community in Shrewsbury Township, York County, Pennsylvania, United States. Hametown is located two miles (3.2 km) north of Shrewsbury Borough on Susquehanna Trail.

== Notable person ==
- Guy Leader, poultry farm owner and Pennsylvania State Senator, was born in Hametown.
