= Guy Leader =

American politician and businessman

Guy Alvin Leader (October 21, 1887 – October 15, 1978) was an American politician and businessman.

Born in Hametown, Pennsylvania, Leader owned a poultry business in York County, Pennsylvania. He served in the Pennsylvania State Senate, as a Democrat, from 1943 to 1951. His son was Governor of Pennsylvania George M. Leader. Leader died in Leader Heights, Pennsylvania.
