= Wilson G. Sarig =

American politician and educator

Speaker of the Pennsylvania House of Representatives
- In office January 1, 1935 – March 14, 1936
- Preceded by: Grover C. Talbot
- Succeeded by: Roy E. Furman

Member of the Pennsylvania House of Representatives from Berks County's 4th district
- In office December 1, 1930 – March 14, 1936
- In office December 1, 1922 – November 30, 1928

Member of the Pennsylvania House of Representatives from Berks County's 2nd district
- In office December 1, 1914 – November 30, 1920

Personal details
- Born: March 7, 1874 Lenhartsville, Pennsylvania
- Died: March 14, 1936 (aged 62) Temple, Pennsylvania
- Party: Democratic
- Spouse: Jenie Unterkofler
- Children: Two
- Education: Keystone State Normal School

Wilson G. Sarig (March 7, 1874 – March 14, 1936) was an American politician and educator who was Speaker of the Pennsylvania House of Representatives from 1935 to 1936. He served three separate stints in the House of Representatives, representing Berks County from 1914 to 1920, 1922 to 1928, and from 1930 to 1936.

== Early life and education ==
Sarig was born on March 7, 1874, on a farm in Lenhartsville, Pennsylvania. Sarig grew up on the farm, spending his summers engaged in farm-related chores. He attended Keystone State Normal School, simultaneously beginning a career as a public school teacher in 1891, graduating in 1894.

== Career ==
Sarig continued to teach school until announcing his retirement one day before his death in 1936. After serving as a delegate to the Berks County Convention in 1895 and from 1900 to 1915 as justice of the peace for Muhlenberg Township, Sarig was elected to the Pennsylvania House of Representatives in 1914, in which position he would serve until mounting an unsuccessful campaign for the Pennsylvania State Senate in 1920. As Sarig had run for the State Senate in lieu of reelection to the House, he left office in 1920, but was subsequently elected to a nonconsecutive term in Berks County's Fourth District in 1922. Sarig's original district, Berks County's Second, had been redistricted to become the Fourth District in the interim. Sarig's second stint in the House of Representatives ended when he was defeated in his bid for re-election to a third consecutive term, and sixth term in total, in 1928. For a third and final time, Sarig was elected as a nonincumbent to the State House—again representing Berks County's Fourth District—in 1930. He served until 1936.

Sarig unsuccessfully sought the Speakership of the Pennsylvania House of Representatives in each of his first two stints in the House, in 1917, in 1923, and again in 1927. In 1931, at the beginning of his third stint, Sarig was elected to serve as Democratic floor leader and did so until 1934. He mounted an unsuccessful campaign for Pennsylvania Auditor General in 1932 and, as the Democratic leader, was again a candidate for Speaker in 1931 and 1933. His sixth candidacy for Speaker was successful, the Democrats having finally achieved a majority in the House, and he became Speaker of the House on January 1, 1935, a position which he would occupy until his death. Sarig was the first Democrat to hold the Pennsylvania Speakership in the 20th century, over fifty years having elapsed since the most recent preceding Democratic speakership.

== Personal life ==
Sarig married Jenie Unterkofler and, together, they had two daughters. Suffering from illness but planning to run for reelection to a tenth term in the State House, Sarig died on March 14, 1936, in Berks County, and was buried at Laureldale Cemetery.

== Legacy ==
Until its sale in 1989, the Wilson G. Sarig Elementary School in Temple, Pennsylvania, in which Sarig began his lifelong career teaching public school, was named in his honor. In addition, Sarig's daughter Mae established a scholarship at Kutztown University of Pennsylvania, formerly the Keystone State Normal School, in honor of her father. The Wilson G. Sarig Scholarship is awarded based on financial need to a student "whose attitude indicates a seriousness of purpose."
