= Roy E. Furman =

American politician

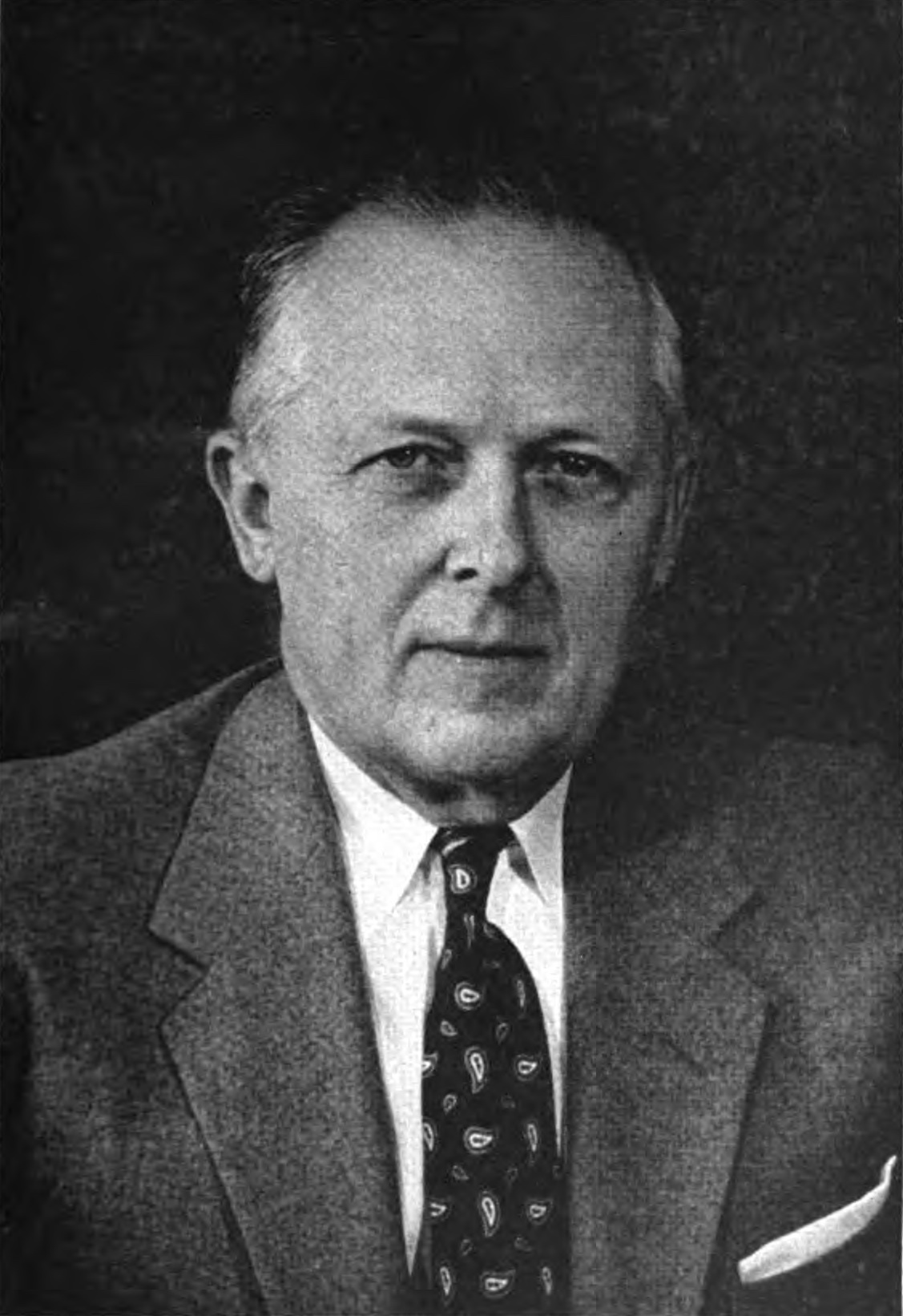
- Furman circa 1956

21st Lieutenant Governor of Pennsylvania
- In office January 18, 1955 – January 20, 1959
- Governor: George Leader
- Preceded by: Lloyd Wood
- Succeeded by: John Morgan Davis

129th Speaker of the Pennsylvania House of Representatives
- In office March 14, 1936 – November 30, 1938
- Preceded by: Wilson Sarig
- Succeeded by: Ellwood Turner

Member of the Pennsylvania House of Representatives from the Greene County district
- In office January 3, 1933 – November 30, 1940

Personal details
- Born: April 16, 1901 Waynesburg, Pennsylvania, U.S.
- Died: May 18, 1977 (aged 76) Harrisburg, Pennsylvania, U.S.
- Party: Democratic
- Spouse: Helen Ross
- Education: Waynesburg College (BA)
- Profession: Construction company owner

Roy E. Furman (April 16, 1901 – May 18, 1977) was an American politician who served as the 21st lieutenant governor of Pennsylvania from 1955 to 1959 and as Speaker of the Pennsylvania House of Representative from 1936 to 1938.

== Life and career ==
Furman was born in Davistown, Greene County, Pennsylvania. Educated at Waynesburg College and owner of a construction company, he was elected to the Pennsylvania House of Representatives in 1932 and became Speaker of the House in 1936. He retired in 1940 to return to his construction business but remained politically active as chair of Greene County Democrats for ten years. He served as Lieutenant Governor of Pennsylvania from January 1955 to 1959 during Governor George M. Leader's administration. In 1958, Furman ran for the Democratic nomination for governor but lost to David Lawrence.

Furman served on the Pennsylvania Turnpike Commission during Governor Lawrence's term, later serving on the state transportation commission. Act 127 of 1975 designated Pennsylvania Route 21 as the “Roy E. Furman Highway.”

Furman retired to New Cumberland, Pennsylvania, and died in Harrisburg at the age of 76.

== See also ==
- List of Pennsylvania state legislatures

Political offices
Preceded by Lloyd Wood	Lieutenant Governor of Pennsylvania; 1955–1959	Succeeded by John Morgan Davis
Preceded by Wilson Sarig	Speaker of the Pennsylvania House of Representatives; 1936–1938	Succeeded by Ellwood Turner
Party political offices
Preceded by Michael Musmanno	Democratic nominee for Lieutenant Governor of Pennsylvania; 1954	Succeeded by John Morgan Davis
