= 1910–1911 Westmoreland County coal strike =

Miners' strike in Pennsylvania, United States

Westmoreland coal miners' strike
- Date: 1910–1911
- Location: Westmoreland County, Pennsylvania, United States
- Goals: Union recognition; Eight-hour day
- Methods: Strikes, protest, demonstrations
- Result: defeat for the trade union

Parties
United Mine Workers	Keystone Coal and Coke; Coal and Iron Police; Pennsylvania State Police; Sheriff's deputies

Lead figures
Van Bittner; Mother Jones	

Casualties and losses
Deaths: 16; Injuries: Arrests: ?	Deaths: Injuries:

The Westmoreland County coal strike of 1910–1911, or the Westmoreland coal miners' strike, was a strike by coal miners represented by the United Mine Workers of America. The strike is also known as the Slovak Strike because about 70 percent of the miners were Slovak immigrants. It began in Westmoreland County, Pennsylvania, on March 9, 1910, and ended on July 1, 1911. At its height, the strike encompassed 65 mines and 15,000 coal miners. Sixteen people were killed during the strike, nearly all of them striking miners or members of their families. The strike ended in defeat for the union.

== Background ==
The Irwin gas coal basin is an area in Westmoreland County, Pennsylvania. It encompasses the townships of North Huntingdon, Penn, Sewickley, Salem, South Huntingdon, Hempfield and Irwin, and the boroughs of Murrysville, Export and Delmont. The coal mined in the district was unsuitable for use as coke. However, it was ideal for gasification and conversion into coal gas.

Seven companies dominated coal mining in the Irwin Basin in 1910. In 1854, the Westmoreland Coal Company was formed to begin mining coal in the region. In 1905, it bought a controlling interest in Penn Gas Coal, a company established in 1861 to gasify coal. Penn Gas Coal, in turn, had obtained a one-third ownership in the Manor Gas Coal Company. Through these purchases, Westmoreland Coal had a near-monopoly on the gas coal market, and was the largest bituminous coal company in Pennsylvania. In 1892, Robert Jamison and his sons founded the Jamison Coal and Coke Company (originally the Jamison Coal Company). In 1886, the Berwind family and Judge Allison White founded the Berwind-White Coal Mining Co. In 1902, a number of smaller coal gas companies in and around Greensburg, Pennsylvania, merged to form the Keystone Coal and Coke Company. In 1905, Latrobe-Connellsville Coal and Coke Company was formed when Marcus W. Saxman merged three of his wholly owned or controlled coal companies.

These companies were very paternalistic. Company towns (colloquially referred to as "coal patches") were established, company stores founded and workers often paid in company scrip.

== Origins of the strike ==
Coal miners increasingly agitated for improved wages and working conditions after 1900. Miners demanded an eight-hour day and wages equal to those paid in the nearby Pittsburgh coal basin. Since miners were paid by the ton, workers also wanted to standardize the size of coal wagons to ensure they were paid fairly. Miners also sought to be paid for mining "slack" (very fine coal), and for "dead work" (laying of track, shoring up tunnels, pumping out water, and removing slate and clay).

Westmoreland Coal, Penn Gas Coal and Keystone Coal and Coke strongly resisted the miners' demands and any attempt at unionization. Companies used the Coal and Iron Police to physically intimidate and sometimes beat pro-union miners, workers were fired, and coal companies evicted families from the "coal patches" whenever miners struck.

The situation came to a head in 1910. The coal companies reduced wages by 16 percent, paying only 58 cents per ton-and-a-half of coal mined. The breaking point came when Keystone Coal and Coke announced that miners would have to begin using new safety lights and new forms of explosives—and pay for these items themselves.

== Strike ==
Miners' unions had tried to organize Westmoreland County coal mines since 1883, but had little success. In February 1910, however, the lower wage rates and new expenses led miners at Keystone Coal and Coke to meet and discuss their grievances among themselves. The miners decided to invite the United Mine Workers of America (UMWA) to form a union.

On March 7, 1910, Van Bittner, a UMWA vice president, arrived in Westmoreland County and formed a local union. Four hundred miners signed up and paid dues. Keystone Coke and Coal immediately fired 100 miners for attending the union organizing meeting. The Keystone miners walked off the job, and the strike swiftly spread throughout the Irwin Basin.

Union recognition became the biggest issue in the strike. The workers felt that if they could win recognition of the union, their other demands would come easily.

When the miners struck on March 9, the coal companies evicted thousands of families from their company-owned homes. UMWA spent $25,000 purchasing tents and constructing shanties, and set up 25 tent cities to accommodate the homeless. Near the town of Export, more than 100 tents went up, making it the largest tent city during the strike.

Ethnic tension threatened to divide the nascent union. Slovaks comprised 70 percent of the striking miners, but the strike committee was led by native-born miners of English, German and Irish descent. UMWA organizers Bittner and Frank Hayes worked hard to overcome these divisions, however. Multi-lingual organizers were employed, each ethnic group elected its own representatives, and parades and rallies featured musicians and speakers from all groups.

Public backing for the strike was high. Westmoreland County had a long history of support for unions. Local religious leaders signed petitions in favor of the union, testified before the United States Congress on behalf of workers, and called on the governor and state legislature to force the coal companies to submit to arbitration.

UMWA support for the strike, however, was not nearly as strong. International union president Thomas Lewis had not condoned the strike, and criticized efforts by leaders in surrounding UMWA Districts to drum up increased support for the strikers. But in March 1910, a special meeting of the UMWA international executive board voted to support the strike, forcing Lewis to grudgingly offer the union's resources. Eventually, the union gave more than $1 million in relief payments to the strikers. Lewis, however, continued to work to undermine the union's support for the strike. He backed an insurgent faction in District 6 to unseat leaders who supported the strike. The act led to internecine warfare in the union and charges that Lewis and his candidates were in league with mine owners.

=== Strikebreakers ===
To end the strike and break the union, the coal companies began importing thousands of Eastern European immigrants to work the mines. Coal company representatives on the East Coast promised immigrants a job and housing, and paid for them and their families to move to Pennsylvania. The flow of strikebreakers was small at first, but by the fall it was nearly a flood. The number of new immigrant workers was so large that the Penn Gas Coal company constructed 30 two-story houses in Hahntown to house its replacement workers, leading local residents to refer to the area as "Scab Hill".

Management often took advantage of the strikebreakers, however. Company recruiters were ordered not to tell potential workers that they would be employed as strikebreakers. The coal companies sought out recent immigrants who did not speak English (or who spoke or understood it poorly), and then used this handicap against the strikebreakers. If workers tried to quit, the Coal and Iron Police prevented them from leaving and told them that they had to work off the cost of their transportation before resigning. When strikebreakers still tried to leave, the police beat them and forced them back to work. In some cases, fences were built around strikebreaker housing to intimidate the workers into staying. The abuse of strikebreakers was so severe that the U.S. House of Representatives Committee on Labor held hearings on whether the coal companies had illegally forced people into peonage.

=== Labor injunctions and other legal actions ===
Employers also turned to the courts for assistance. In April 1910, Keystone Coal and Coke sought a restraining order to prevent striking miners from approaching company property on the grounds that the number of strikers and the loud noises they made intimidated company employees. Although the local sheriff testified that the strikers had committed no acts of violence, the state district court issued a sweeping injunction which essentially barred the union from use of public roads:

Miners are restrained from conducting or engaging in marches to the mines, property and works of said Keystone Coal and Coke Company and from assembling at or near the works of said company for the purpose of holding meetings at such places at any time, and from assembling on the highways at such places where the employees of the said company ordinarily pass to and from their work, and from preventing said employees from going peaceably along said injunction: highways and also from attempting by noise, intimidation, threats, personal violence or by any other means to interfere with the employees of said company in their desire to labor or with any of the property of the said company until further order of this court.

The vague terms of the injunction led law enforcement officials to arrest miners as much as a half mile from Keystone grounds. Other coal companies quickly asked for similar injunctions which "made marching, assembling or traversing public roads illegal".

The coal companies moved aggressively to exploit the law in other ways as well. The Coal and Iron Police patrolled company property and denied admittance to union members and supporters. Union members were often arrested for using public roads which traversed company property. Small towns and villages, often encircled by coal company land, became isolated and embattled. In Herminie, all citizens were required to obtain a pass from the local mine manager before leaving the village. Union members were denied the use of post offices or the ability to enter local courthouses, because these facilities were often on coal company property. Nearly 1,000 miners were ultimately arrested for trespass or disorderly conduct. Simply walking home in a group from a union meeting on a public highway could earn a contempt citation and a $50 fine.

In 1911, seven coal companies in Westmoreland County and Allegheny County sued the leaders of the strike. The coal companies claimed they had suffered economic losses as high as $500,000 due to the strike and strike-related property damage. Twenty-eight officers in nearby District 5 and 17 strike leaders in Westmoreland County were arrested on charges of conspiracy, intimidation, violence and general lawlessness. Local labor unions helped the 45 men post bond of $300 each, and instituted a special per capita assessment to form a legal defense fund. But the public outcry was so extraordinary that the coal companies dropped the suits.

=== Use of security personnel ===
Employers also used force to intimidate striking miners. At their disposal were the Coal and Iron Police, local law enforcement personnel, and the Pennsylvania State Police.

- The Coal and Iron Police primarily protected company property, protected strikebreakers, and kept strikebreakers from quitting. But in many ways, their role in the strike was quite limited.
- Sheriff's deputies and local police deputies proved to be a much bigger problem. The coal companies paid the Westmoreland County sheriff to provide deputies to protect their property and replacement workers (a common practice at the time). Although the sheriff's deputies would be acting under the color of law, they were paid for and under the control of the coal companies. The Westmoreland County sheriff obtained many deputies through "detective agencies" notorious of their strikebreaking activities, but nevertheless instructed the deputies to exercise restraint and ignore peaceful marches. He also warned them that he would dismiss deputies who committed acts of violence.

Despite this, sheriff's deputies instigated and participated in three particularly violent and deadly incidents:

- On May 8, 1910, sheriff's deputies attempted to prevent a handful of strikebreakers from permanently quitting their jobs at the Westmoreland Coal Company in the town of Yukon, Pennsylvania. About four hours after the replacement workers had returned to their boarding house, 25 sheriff's deputies and Pennsylvania state policemen broke into and searched the boarding house. A crowd of striking miners gathered and ridiculed their failure to find the workers. The furious and embarrassed sheriff's deputies then fired into the crowd. Thirty people were injured and one man killed. The Westmoreland County sheriff withdrew the commissions of 18 deputies involved in the incident, but the Westmoreland Coal Company had them sworn in as local police deputies instead.
- Shortly after the Yukon incident, a small group of miners walking home from a meeting in Export passed coal company property. A squad of 20 sheriff's deputies and State Police troopers attacked them. Several miners were severely beaten, and one miner (trying to protect a child in his arms) was killed.
- In July 1910, striking miners secured a march permit from the town of South Greensburg. As the miners began their march, deputy sheriffs and Coal and Iron Police on horseback stopped them. Although the local chief of police stepped forward and told the deputies that the miners had permission to march, the deputies ignored him and continued to block the marchers. The miners attempted to walk away, but the deputies charged into them with their horses, swinging clubs. A riot ensued and the sheriff's deputies fired into the crowd—killing a miner. When the chief of police attempted to arrest the deputy responsible, the other deputies seized him and charged him with obstructing an officer in the performance of his duty. Outraged citizens of the town mobbed the sheriff's office and forced his release.

Problems with the deputies were so severe that in November 1910 the Westmoreland County sheriff stopped securing them for the coal companies. The companies responded by seeking deputies from local police forces instead.

In January 1911, the Westmoreland County sheriff began deputizing striking miners as deputy sheriffs (although they served without pay). In May 1911, four sheriff's deputies were cited for contempt of court for venturing too close to coal company property. The sheriff said that the men had done so in their official capacity as deputies, but the local court fined them anyway. The Westmoreland County sheriff became so frustrated with the injunction that he refused to permit his deputies to patrol marches on public highways.

The Pennsylvania State Police (PSP) proved to be the most violent group during the strike. The PSP had been founded in 1905 to discourage the use of private police forces in workers' strikes and to provide law enforcement when local police or sheriffs were unable or unwilling to enforce the law. But rather than enforce the law, the PSP proved the group most willing to break it. One trooper described how the State Police dealt with strikers: "We ride in, scoop them up and beat hell out of them."

The number of unprovoked violent acts committed by the PSP was extremely high and frequent. James Maurer, a socialist member of the Pennsylvania General Assembly from Reading, conducted a survey asking for information on State Police actions during the strike. Maurer's survey found that violence significantly increased after the arrival of the State Police, and that almost all acts of violence were committed by state troopers without provocation. Mauer was so outraged by the results of his survey that he introduced a bill to abolish the state police. Hundreds of citizens later testified before state and federal commissions that mounted State Police routinely charged onto town sidewalks or into crowds, trampling and severely injuring men, women and children (whether strikers or not). Severe beatings with fists and clubs were common, with troopers breaking into and ransacking homes without warrants, beating citizens and striking miners alike. Local police officials claimed State Police routinely beat people on the street for no reason, and resisted local police attempts to stop them. State Police troopers shot up towns "in true Western style", and fired indiscriminately into crowds or into tent cities (killing and wounding sleeping women and children). Sexual assault (including rape) was disturbingly common, and at least one hotel manager accused troopers of promoting prostitution.

State Police were also involved in a number of serious violent incidents, several of which resulted in the deaths of unarmed strikers:

- In May 1910, State Police allegedly killed a man in cold blood. Several State Police officers and a coal company executive stopped and questioned four striking miners who did not speak English. An English-speaking miner who spoke their language came on the scene and told the four men to run off. They did so and escaped, but the State Police troopers chased the fifth man into a barn. The miner was shot and killed. The numerous witnesses testified that the miner was begging for his life when a State Trooper shot him. But the other troopers and a coal company executive stated that the miner was killed in self-defense, and the trooper was exonerated.
- In May 1911, State Police assaulted a group of striking miners on a public road. The miners, on their way to a meeting, walked past property owned by the Jamison Coal and Coke Company. The road narrowed where a creek ran past the property. The mounted State Police troopers blocked the mines' path at this point, then charged into the crowd. Two miners were shot and several severely beaten. A Westmoreland County sheriff's deputy accompany the miners was also badly beaten.
- In June 1911, miners secured a permit to march past facilities owned by the Penn Gas Coal Company. As the marchers peacefully walked past the company's front gate, State Police opened fire. More than 150 shots were fired, causing panic and several injuries. Westmoreland County sheriff's deputies (all miners) identified three of the troopers and went to Penn Gas Coal Company to arrest them. Instead, Pennsylvania State Police and Coal and Iron Police arrested the deputies for violating the court injunction. A court sentenced the deputies to five days in jail. When the Westmoreland County sheriff refused to put his deputies in jail, the court ordered the sheriff's arrest and charged him with malfeasance. Despite the pleas of a jury, the court sentenced the sheriff to one year and three months in solitary confinement and hard labor.

During the strike, six striking miners, nine wives of striking miners, and one bystander were killed, and thousands of strikers and members of their families severely beaten or wounded.

== End of the strike ==
By mid-1911, the strike had taken its toll on the coal companies. At least $500,000 had been spent on security, and coal production had dropped by 45 percent. The larger companies, however, used their financial reserves and income from non-mining operations (such as rental properties, company stores and even breweries) to withstand the economic pressure exerted by the miners. But all companies benefited from a significant slump in the demand for coal in 1910 and 1911, which leveled the playing field vis-a-vis their competitors.

But the miners were worse off than the employers. The winter of 1910–11 was particularly cold, and the miners and their families suffered tremendously. The union built numerous shacks and shanties, and moved miners' families out of tents and into the shacks for better protection from the elements. But not enough shelter could be erected, and 400 families spent the entire winter in tents. Hunger and disease were also beginning to become widespread among strikers' families.

In early 1911, the UMWA's support for the strikers appeared strong. In January 1911, Lewis lost the presidency of UMWA to John P. White. White fully backed the strike, and the UMWA convention reaffirmed the union's support for the miners.

But just six months later, the UMWA called a halt to the strike. The union had disbursed more than $1 million in strike relief funds, but it was no longer financially able to keep the strike going. On July 1, 1911, the UMWA executive board voted to end to the strike. Although most miners returned to work, about 400 were blacklisted and forced to seek employment outside Pennsylvania.

== Women's resistance ==
The Westmoreland County coal strike was the setting for one of the more colorful incidents in the life of Mary Harris Jones, better known as "Mother Jones". Even though she was 73 years of age, Mother Jones agreed to travel to Westmoreland County to support the United Mine Workers in their strike.

=== Singing women ===
A number of miners' wives had been arrested in the summer of 1910 for harassing strikebreakers and company security personnel.

Jones encouraged the women to bring their babies and small children with them when they were sentenced by the court in Greensburg. The presiding judge sentenced the women to pay a $30 fine or serve 30 days in jail. Unable to pay, the women were jailed. As there was no one else to care for the children, the judge was forced to jail the children along with their mothers.

While the women were being processed for imprisonment, Jones instructed them: "You sing the whole night long. You can spell one another if you get tired and hoarse. Sleep all day and sing all night and don't stop for anyone. Say you're singing to the babies. I will bring the little ones milk and fruit. Just you all sing and sing."

Fortunately, the jail was next door to the sheriff's home, as well as several hotels, lodging houses, and other homes. The sound of women singing all through the night kept most of the townspeople awake. After five days of sleeplessness, the townspeople angrily demanded that the judge order the women's release. He did so.

The incident has become known as "the women who sang their way out of jail".

== See also ==
- Murder of workers in labor disputes in the United States
