= Grover C. Talbot =

American politician (1885–1935)

Grover Cleveland Talbot
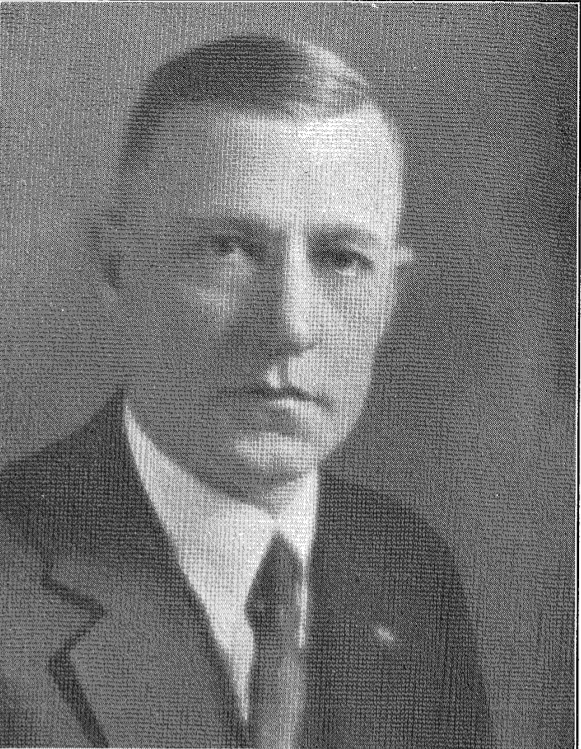

70th Speaker of the Pennsylvania House of Representatives
- In office 1933–1935
- Preceded by: C.J. Goodnough
- Succeeded by: Wilson G. Sarig

Member of the Pennsylvania House of Representatives from the Delaware County district
- In office 1925–1934

Personal details
- Born: April 23, 1885
- Died: December 21, 1935 (aged 50) Drexel Hill, Pennsylvania, U.S.
- Resting place: Mt. Zion Cemetery, Darby, Pennsylvania, U.S.
- Party: Republican

Grover Cleveland Talbot (April 23, 1885 – December 21, 1935) was an American politician from Pennsylvania who served as a Republican member of the Pennsylvania House of Representatives for Delaware County from 1925 to 1934 and as the 70th Speaker of the Pennsylvania House of Representatives from 1933 to 1934.

== Early life and education ==
Talbot was born in East Coventry Township, Pennsylvania and attended public schools in Philadelphia, Pennsylvania. After high school, he worked in the Talbot Coal Company owned by his father and as a lumberman in North Carolina. In 1914, he moved back to Pennsylvania and worked as director of the Tinicum Bank in Essington, Pennsylvania. He also worked as a director of the Essington Bank & Loan and the Norwood Bank & Loan.

He served as first sergeant in company G of the Pennsylvania Reserve Militia from 1918 to 1919 during World War I.

== Career ==
Talbot was elected in the Borough of Norwood, Pennsylvania as registry assessor in 1917, to city council from 1918 to 1921 and as chief burgess from 1921 to 1925.

Talbot was elected to the Pennsylvania House of Representatives for Delaware County and served from 1925 to 1934 including as the 116th Speaker of the Pennsylvania House of Representatives from 1933 to 1934.

Talbot authored two bills known as the Talbot Acts. The first Talbot Act allocated $10 million in unemployment assistance during the Great Depression. In 1931, the bill became law as Act 7E, without the signature of Governor Gifford Pinchot. The constitutionality of the law was challenged, and in 1932, it was deemed to be constitutional by the Pennsylvania Supreme Court. The ruling set a precedent and determined the state's constitutional right to appropriate funds for unemployment relief.

The funding for the first Talbot Act proved inadequate, and in 1932, Talbot introduced the second Talbot Act (Act 52), which provided an additional $12 million in unemployment aid. A third piece of legislation, the Hagmaier Sales Tax Act (Act 53), was implemented, which enacted a sales tax of 1% for six months on all retail sales, except farm products, in order to fund the second Talbot Act.

Talbot was not a candidate for reelection to the House in 1934. He had an unsuccessful campaign for Lieutenant Governor in 1935.

In 1935, Talbot was named the president of the Pennsylvania Retail Coal Dealers Association.

Talbot died in an automobile accident in Drexel Hill, Pennsylvania and is interred at the Mt. Zion Cemetery in Darby, Pennsylvania.

== Personal life ==
Talbot was married to Elizabeth Moore Riddick and together they had two daughters. He was a member of the Free & Accepted Masons and the Knights Templar.
