= 1940 United States Senate election in Pennsylvania =

- November 5, 1940
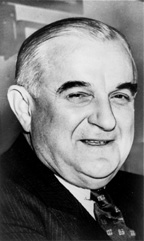

Nominee	Joseph F. Guffey	Jay Cooke
Party	Democratic	Republican
Popular vote	2,069,980	1,893,104
Percentage	51.79%	47.36%
- County results Guffey: 50–60% 60–70% Cooke: 40–50% 50–60% 60–70% 70–80%
U.S. senator before election
Joseph F. Guffey
Democratic
Elected U.S. Senator
Joseph F. Guffey
Democratic

The 1940 United States Senate election in Pennsylvania was held on November 5, 1940. Incumbent Democratic U.S. Senator Joseph F. Guffey successfully sought re-election to another term, defeating the Republican nominee, Jay Cooke.

As of 2023, this is the last time that Mifflin County and Montour County voted Democratic in a Senate election. This was also the last time until 1991 that Democrats won this Senate seat, and the last until 2006 that they were elected to this seat for a full term.

== General election ==
=== Candidates ===
- Joseph F. Guffey, incumbent U.S. Senator (Democratic)
- Jay Cooke, businessman and chairman of the Philadelphia Republican city committee (Republican)

=== Results ===
General election results
Party	Candidate	Votes	%	±%
Democratic	Joseph F. Guffey (inc.)	2,069,980	51.79%	▲1.01
Republican	Jay Cooke	1,893,104	47.36%	▼0.90
Socialist	David H.H. Felix	15,449	0.39%	Steady
Prohibition	H. B. Mansell	11,113	0.28%	▼0.40
Communist	Carl Reeve	4,761	0.12%	▼0.09
Socialist Labor	Frank Knotek	2,503	0.06%	▼0.10
Write-in		110	0.00%	Steady
Totals		3,997,020	100.00%	
