= 1950 Pennsylvania gubernatorial election =

- November 7, 1950
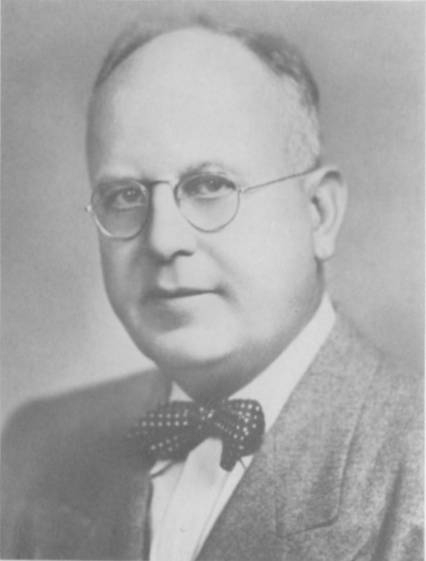

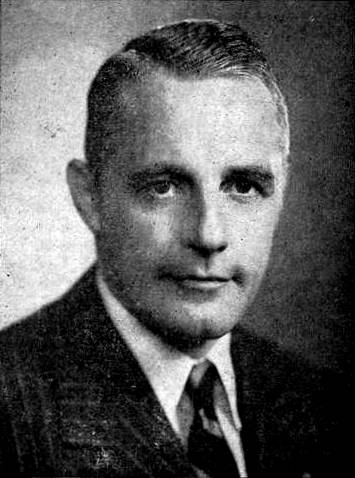
Nominee	John Fine	Richardson Dilworth
Party	Republican	Democratic
Running mate	Lloyd Wood	Michael Musmanno
Popular vote	1,796,119	1,710,355
Percentage	50.74%	48.31%
- County results Fine: 40–50% 50–60% 60–70% 70–80% Dilworth: 50–60% 60–70%
Governor before election
Jim Duff
Republican
Elected Governor
John S. Fine
Republican

The 1950 Pennsylvania gubernatorial election was held on November 7. For the twenty-second time in twenty-five elections, the Republican candidate was victorious, but by a much smaller than usual margin. Superior Court Judge John S. Fine defeated Democrat Richardson Dilworth, the City Controller of Philadelphia. This election marked the last time until 2022 that a political party would win three consecutive gubernatorial elections in Pennsylvania.

== Democratic primary ==
=== Candidates ===
- Richardson Dilworth, Philadelphia City Controller
- Clarence P. Bowers, Reading businessman and unsuccessful candidate for the Democratic nomination in the 1942 Pennsylvania gubernatorial election
- Henry Arthur Morris, music store operator from Mahanoy City and unsuccessful candidate for the Democratic nomination in the 1946 Pennsylvania gubernatorial election

=== Results ===
Democratic primary results Dilworth: 50%–60%; 60%–70%; 70%–80%; 80%–90%; 90%–100%

Pennsylvania gubernatorial Democratic primary election, 1950
Party	Candidate	Votes	%
Democratic	Richardson Dilworth	456,707	79.80
Democratic	Clarence P. Bowers	59,796	10.45
Democratic	Henry Arthur Morris	55,774	9.75
Total votes		572,277	100.00

== Republican primary ==
=== Candidates ===
- John Fine, Superior Court Judge (from Luzerne County)
- Jay Cooke, veteran of World War I and World War II and candidate for U.S. Senate in 1940 (from Montgomery County)
- Charles Scott Williams, Lycoming County judge

=== Results ===
Republican primary results Fine: 40%–50%; 50%–60%; 60%–70%; 70%–80%; Cooke: 40%–50%; 50%–60%; 60%–70%; 70%–80%; Williams: 60%–70%

Pennsylvania gubernatorial Republican primary election, 1950
Party	Candidate	Votes	%
Republican	John Fine	783,078	54.73
Republican	Jay Cooke	583,683	40.79
Republican	Charles Scott Williams	64,068	4.48
Total votes		1,430,829	100.00

== Major party candidates ==
=== Democratic ===
- Richardson Dilworth, Philadelphia City Controller
  - running mate: Michael Musmanno, Court of Common Pleas Judge (from Allegheny County)

=== Republican ===
- John Fine, Superior Court Judge (from Luzerne County)
  - running mate: Lloyd Wood, State Senator (from Montgomery County)

== Campaign ==
Despite the popularity of outgoing governor (and 1950 U.S. Senate candidate) Jim Duff and the low approval ratings of President Harry Truman, Democrats came into the election with a cautiously optimistic outlook. In Dilworth, they had selected a charismatic candidate with a strong reputation as a reformer after serving as a key figure in the Democratic overthrow of Philadelphia's corrupt Republican political machine. Furthermore, although Republicans held registration advantages throughout the state, many voters were ambivalent toward their policies due to a 1949–50 recession that impacted crucial heavy industries.

In contrast to the energetic Dilworth, the Republican nominee Fine was somewhat uncomfortable in the public eye, after having spent his career as a backroom power player and party boss. Fine had once been a close associate of progressive Governor Gifford Pinchot and had spent the previous twenty years as Northeastern Pennsylvania 's key political figure. Fine represented the consistency of the long-dominant state political machine and, although he was somewhat more conservative than the outgoing governor, was chosen as Duff's hand-picked successor to hold steady a Republican ship that was on cruise control.

The election was marked by a variety of brutal personal attacks. First, Fine was forced to wage a contentious primary battle. Jay Cooke, a wealthy Philadelphia banker, mobilized the arch-conservative business wing of the party, while Charles Williams, a Lycoming County Common Pleas Judge, led a small but vocal group of anti-machine Republicans. Although Fine won by twenty points over Cooke, the party had difficulty healing their wounds in the general election. In the fall, Fine and Dilworth further toned up the rhetoric. The Philadelphia Democrat portrayed his opponent as a crony who oversaw a Tammany Hall-style patronage system and asserted that Fine's agenda would "roll back the Twentieth Century." Fine fired back by painting Dilworth as a candidate who would be soft on communism and allow subversives to penetrate state government; he even went so far as to compare state Democrats to a "psychiatric problem."

On Election Day, Fine carried the gubernatorial ticket by about two points, despite Governor Duff's large win in the Senate race. Although Fine ran well in heavily Republican Central Pennsylvania and limited Dilworth's advantage in the Democratic stronghold of metropolitan Pittsburgh, he lost by a slim margin his home base in the Scranton/Wilkes-Barre area. Furthermore, Dilworth gained 42% of the vote in Philadelphia's four suburban counties, despite only 17% of area residents holding Democratic voter registration.

== Results ==
Pennsylvania gubernatorial election, 1950
Party	Candidate	Running mate	Votes	Percentage
Republican	John Fine	Lloyd Wood	1,796,119	50.74%
Democratic	Richardson Dilworth	Michael Musmanno	1,710,355	48.31%
Prohibition	Richard Blews		12,282	0.35%
G.I.'s Against Communism	Reggie Naugle		7,715	0.22%
Progressive	Tom Fitzpatrick		6,097	0.17%
Socialist	Robert Wilson		5,005	0.14%
Independent	George Taylor		1,645	0.05%
Totals			3,540,029	100.00%
