= Raven's Claw Society =

Honor society at Dickinson College, US

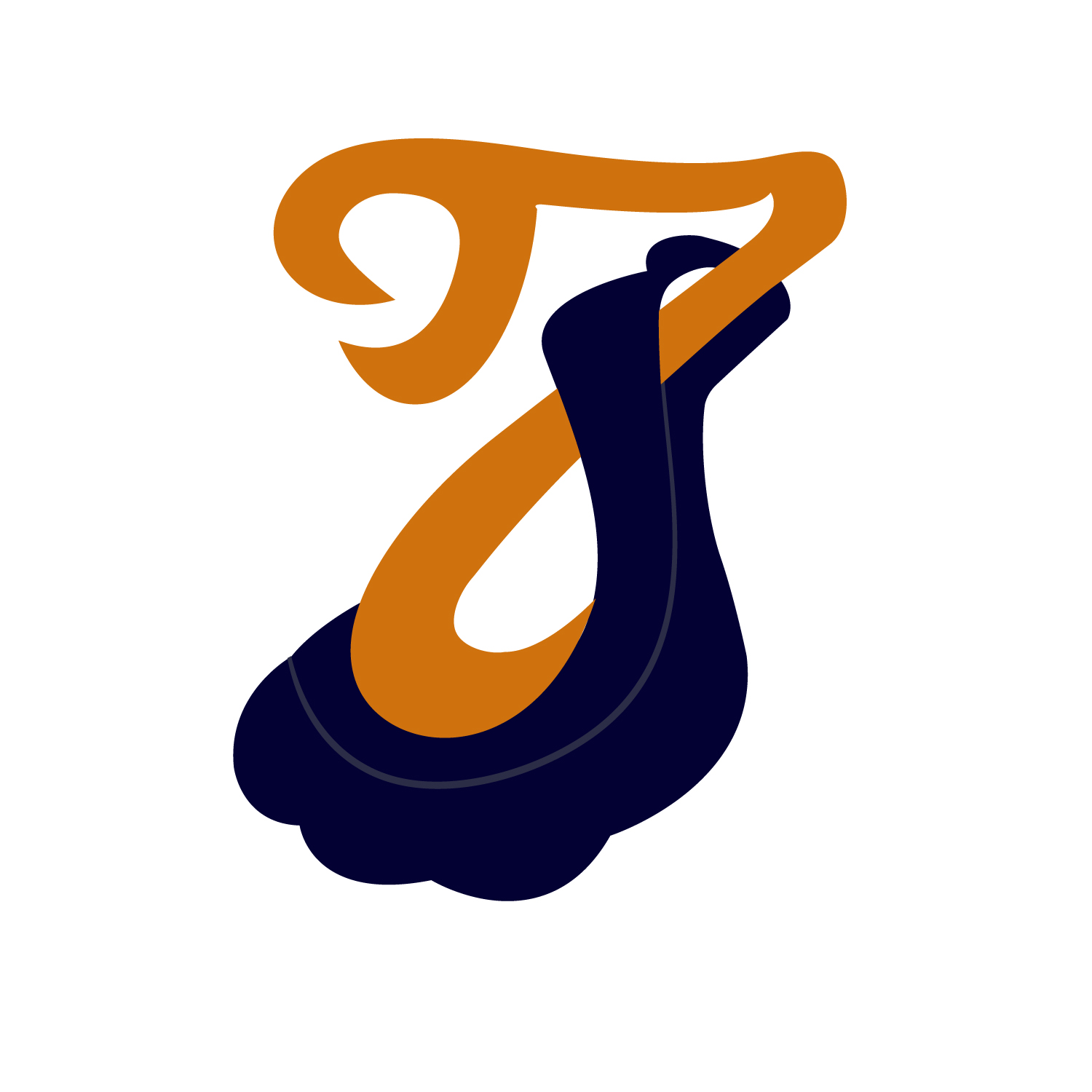
- Founded: 1896; 130 years ago Dickinson College
- Type: Honor
- Affiliation: Independent
- Status: Active
- Emphasis: Senior males
- Scope: Local
- Chapters: 1
- Nickname: Claws, White Hats
- Headquarters: Carlisle, Pennsylvania; United States

The Raven's Claw Society is an all-male senior honor society at Dickinson College. It was founded in 1896 and is the oldest senior or "hat society" on campus.

== History ==
1965 Raven's Claw Tappings Ceremony on the steps of Old West

The Raven's Claw Society was founded in 1896 at Dickinson College as a senior honor society for male students. Formed by seven members of the class of 1896, it was the college's first honor society. Its founders wanted to encourage class and collage loyalty, create good fellowship, and continue college traditions.

Historically, the Raven's Claw membership has consisted of seven students and two faculty advisors, with many members also belonging to social fraternities on campus. The society served Dickinson College and Carlisle, Pennsylvania communities through discreet service activities.

The society's members participate in community service activities and raise funds for charities. In honor of its centennial in 1996, it established the Raven's Claw Scholarship which is awards to students based on financial need.

== Symbols ==
While the members of the group are known, the majority of their actions and traditions are concealed. Originally, the society's badge was a gold number seven on a black raven's claw. In the 1920s, student members started wearing a white hat for special days on campus, resulting in Raven's Claw being known as one of Dickinson's "hat societies". The hats represent unity and loyalty. Members are called Claws or White Hats.

== Membership ==
Membership is limited to seven senior men who are selected by the seven previous members. The new members are chosen based on character, leadership, and involvement in the campus and community during their first three years at Dickinson College. Infrequently, the society breaks with its traditions and inducts a faculty or staff members, such as coach Richard MacAndrews in 1943.

During commencement weekend, members are inducted in a tapping ceremony at the old stone steps Old West.

== Notable members ==
=== Academia ===
- John E. Jones III, 30th President at Dickinson College and a former United States district judge of the United States District Court for the Middle District of Pennsylvania

=== Business ===
- George V. Hager, chairman and CEO of Genesis HealthCare Corporation

=== Entertainment ===
- Philip Capice, television producer, former president of Lorimar Production, and founder of Raven's Claw Productions

=== Politics ===
- Jim Gerlach, U.S. House of Representatives
- John D. Hopper Jr., Pennsylvania State Senator
- Robert E. Woodside, Pennsylvania House of Representatives, Pennsylvania Attorney General and Justice of the Pennsylvania Superior Court

=== Sports ===
- Jim Engles, head men's basketball coach at the New Jersey Institute of Technology
- W. J. Gobrecht, football and basketball player and coach
- Benjamin James (Honorary) athletics coach, educator, and college administrator
- Pete Sivess, Philadelphia Phillies pitcher
- Dave Webster, head lacrosse coach at Dickinson College

== See also ==
- Honor society
