= Jay Cooke IV =

- Born: April 2, 1897; Philadelphia, Pennsylvania
- Died: July 10, 1963 (aged 66)
- Education: Princeton University
- Occupations: Financier and political leader

Jay Cooke (April 2, 1897 – July 10, 1963) was an American financier and political leader who was the Republican Party nominee in the 1940 United States Senate election in Pennsylvania and a candidate for the party's nomination in the 1950 Pennsylvania gubernatorial election.

== Early life ==
Cooke was born in Philadelphia to Jay Cooke III and Nina L. (Benson) Cooke on April 2, 1897. He was the fourth Jay Cooke to play a leading role in finance and politics in Philadelphia. His great-grandfather, Jay Cooke I, played a major role in financing the Union war effort during the American Civil War. His father was the Republican National Committeeman from Pennsylvania and a close friend of President Herbert Hoover. He was the great-grandnephew of Henry D. Cooke and second great-grandson of Eleutheros Cooke. Cooke attended Princeton University, graduating in 1921.

== Military service ==
During World War I, Cooke was a Captain in the United States Army and served as aide-de-camp Joseph E. Kuhn, commander of the 79th Infantry Division. He was gassed in a battle north of Verdun. The attack left him partiality blind and without his voice for six weeks.

Feeling that the American entry into World War II was inevitable, Cooke took a month off from his U.S. Senate campaign to attended the Citizens' Military Training Camp at Fort Meade. He rejoined the Army in 1941 and held the rank of Lieutenant colonel. He commanded a combat battalion during the Battle of Saint-Lô and was hit in the left leg and on the left side of his face by machine gun fire, resulting in the loss of his left eye.

== Business career ==
Cooke joined Chas. D. Barney & Co. in 1921 and became a partner in 1924. He was a limited partner in the successor firm Smith Barney & Co. He gave up most of his business interests in 1935 to focus on politics. In his later years, he was chairman of Cooke & Bieler, investment counselors with offices in the Philadelphia National Bank Building.

== Personal life ==
On April 24, 1924, Cooke married Mary Fisher Glendinning. They had two daughters, one of whom was the daughter-in-law of Hallett Johnson. Mary Cooke died in 1953 while the couple was in Spain. On July 25, 1956, Cooke married Hannah M. Durham. Cooke resided in Blue Bell, Pennsylvania, a suburb of Philadelphia.

== Politics ==
In 1934, Cooke became financial chairman of the Republican state committee. From 1937 to 1941, he was chairman of the Philadelphia Republican city committee.

In 1940, Cooke was endorsed by party leaders in the United States Senate election after three other candidates (Henning Webb Prentis Jr., George W. Pepper, and George W. Maxey) refused to run. He beat Albert H. Ladner Jr. in the Republican primary by a 3 to 1 margin., but lost the general election to Democratic incumbent Joseph F. Guffey 2,069,980 votes to 1,893,104.

In 1948, Cooke managed Harold Stassen's presidential campaign in Pennsylvania. He was unable to get Stassen any votes at the 1948 Republican National Convention.

In 1950, Cooke sought the Republican nomination for Governor of Pennsylvania. He entered the race independent from the Joseph R. Grundy and James H. Duff factions of the party, but eventually received support from Grundy's Pennsylvania Manufacturers' Association, as well as Grundy men G. Mason Owlett, Edward Martin, and John C. Kunkel. Cooke, however promised to continue most of outgoing Governor Duff's programs, with some exceptions. Cooke was defeated in the primary by the Duff-backed candidate, John S. Fine, who went on to win the general election.

From 1956 to 1960, Cooke was the Republican national committeeman from Pennsylvania.

== Death ==
Cooke died on July 10, 1963 at Hospital of the University of Pennsylvania after a brief illness.

Party political offices
Preceded by David A. Reed	Republican nominee for U.S. Senator from Pennsylvania (Class 1); 1940	Succeeded by Edward Martin
