= Fannie Sellins =

American labor unionist (1872–1919)

- Born: Fanny Mooney; 1872; New Orleans, Louisiana, U.S.
- Died: 26 August 1919 (aged 46–47)
- Resting place: Union Cemetery, Arnold, Pennsylvania, U.S.

Fannie Sellins (1872 – August 26, 1919) was an American union organizer.

Born Fanny Mooney in New Orleans, Louisiana, she married Charles Sellins in St. Louis, Missouri. After his death she worked in a garment factory to support her four children. She helped to organize Local # 67 of the International Ladies' Garment Workers' Union in St. Louis, where she became a negotiator for 400 women locked out of a garment factory. Thus she came to the attention of Van Bittner, president of District 5 of the United Mine Workers of America (UMWA).

In 1913, she moved to begin work for the mine workers union in West Virginia. Her work, she wrote, was to distribute "clothing and food to starving women and babies, to assist poverty stricken mothers and bring children into the world, and to minister to the sick and close the eyes of the dying." She was arrested once in Colliers, West Virginia for defying an anti-union injunction. U.S. President Woodrow Wilson intervened for her release.

Sellins had promised to obey the judge's order against picketing. She returned to Colliers from Fairmont, W.Va. and immediately broke her promise by challenging U.S. District Court Judge Alston G. Dayton to arrest her. He did.

With the help of U.S. Congressman Matthew M. Neely, the UMWA waged a public relations campaign to obtain a presidential pardon for Sellins. The union printed thousands of postcards with a photo of Sellins sitting behind the bars of her jail cell in Fairmont. On the back side of the card was the address of the White House.

Philip Murray hired Sellins to join the staff of the UMWA in Pittsburgh, Pennsylvania. In 1919, she was assigned to the Allegheny River Valley district to direct picketing by striking miners at Allegheny Coal and Coke Company. On August 26, she witnessed a posse of a dozen of the sheriff's deputies and Coal and Iron Police beating Joseph Starzeleski, a picketing miner, who was killed. When she intervened, deputies shot and killed her with four bullets, then a deputy used a cudgel to fracture her skull. Others said that she was attempting to protect miners' children that were on scene.

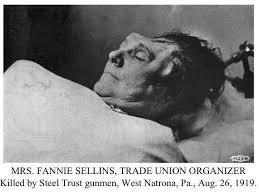
Image of Sellins' smashed skull, circulated during the 1919 Steel Strike

She was buried from St. Peter's Roman Catholic Church in New Kensington, Pennsylvania on August 29 and interred at Union Cemetery in Arnold. A coroner's jury in 1919 ruled her death justifiable homicide and blamed Sellins for starting the riot which led to her death, although other witnesses portrayed a different event than the deputies at the scene. The union and her family raised money to hire a lawyer to press a criminal investigation and pressure officials to reopen the investigation. A grand jury in Pittsburgh, Allegheny County, indicted three deputies for the killings, but a trial in 1923 ended in acquittal for the two men accused of her murder. The actual gunman, John Pearson, never appeared for his trial and never was seen again. The acquittal was viewed among many in the labor movement as an outrage, a miscarriage of justice and an example of systemic bias against workers and their organizations. An estimated 10,000 marchers attended Sellins' funeral procession.

In 1989, the Pennsylvania Historical and Museum Commission approved a state historical marker in honor of Sellins, installed in front Union Cemetery in Arnold.

== See also ==
- Murder of workers in labor disputes in the United States
