= McAdams, Pennsylvania =

Unincorporated community in Pennsylvania, US

- Unincorporated community
- Location within Pennsylvania
- Coordinates: 40°23′10″N 80°16′04″W
- Country: United States
- State: Pennsylvania
- County: Washington
- Elevation: 1,106 ft (337 m)
- Time zone: UTC-5 (Eastern (EST))
  - Summer (DST): UTC-4 (EDT)
- Area code: 724
- GNIS feature ID: 1198230

McAdams (also known as Montour No. 9) is an unincorporated community in Robinson Township, Washington County, Pennsylvania, United States. McAdams is located at the intersection of Pennsylvania Route 980 and North Branch Road, 2.2 miles (3.5 km) west-northwest of McDonald. The community is a coal town which was the site of the Pittsburgh Coal Company's Montour No. 9 mine, which closed in 1954. The Montour Trail passes through the community, as did a branch of the Montour Railroad during the mine's operation.
