= Andrew M. Bradley =

American accountant and Pennsylvania public official

- Born: 1906; Neville Township, Pennsylvania, US
- Died: 1983 (aged 76–77)
- Education: Wharton School of the University of Pennsylvania
- Occupations: Accountant, public official

Andrew M. Bradley (1906–1983) was an American accountant and public official who served as the Commonwealth of Pennsylvania's budget secretary (1955–1957) and then as secretary of property and supplies from July 1957 to 1960. Serving under two Democratic governors, Bradley was the first African American to serve in a Cabinet-level position in Pennsylvania. Additionally, he was the second African American in Pennsylvania to become a certified public accountant.

== Life and career ==
Bradley was born in Neville Township in Alleghany County, Pennsylvania, in 1906. His grandfather had been a slave in Delaware. Bradley graduated from Bedford High School and took night classes at the Wharton School of the University of Pennsylvania, Cades CPA School, and Thompson Business College of Harrisburg. He became a certified public accountant.

Bradley worked as a state auditor from 1937 to 1944. Then, he worked as an independent accountant for ten years before Governor George M. Leader recruited him to oversee the state's budget in January 1955. In July 1957, Leader appointed Bradley as secretary of property and supplies, a major government department responsible for a $50 million budget. Bradley earned a $20,000 salary and continued to serve as secretary of property and supplies under Governor David L. Lawrence.

Bradley was influential in the Pennsylvania Democratic Party, serving five consecutive terms as vice president of the Young Democratic Clubs of Pennsylvania and four consecutive terms as a delegate to the Democratic National Conventions between 1948 and 1960, as well as leading Black Democrats in the state. He served as treasurer of the Democratic State Committee in 1964. He received an honorary doctorate of social science from Lincoln University of Pennsylvania. He lived in Harrisburg.
