= Harry E. Seyler =

American politician and educator

Harry E. Seyler (August 20, 1908 – January 23, 1994) was an American politician and educator.

Born in York, Pennsylvania, Seyler served in the United States Army during World War II. He went to the University of Pennsylvania, taught social studies in the York public school and was principal and assistant superintendent. Seyler served in the Pennsylvania House of Representatives from 1948 to 1954 and then in the Pennsylvania State Senate from 1954 to 1962 as a Democrat. He died in York, Pennsylvania.
