= Lloyd H. Wood =

American politician

20th Lieutenant Governor of Pennsylvania
- In office January 16, 1951 – January 18, 1955
- Governor: John Fine
- Preceded by: Daniel Strickler
- Succeeded by: Roy Furman

Member of the Pennsylvania Senate from the 12th district
- In office January 6, 1947 – November 30, 1950
- Preceded by: Franklin Edwards
- Succeeded by: Henry Propert

Personal details
- Born: October 25, 1896
- Died: February 15, 1964 (aged 67)
- Party: Republican
- Profession: Politician

Lloyd Hobart Wood (October 25, 1896 – February 15, 1964) was an American Republican politician from the Commonwealth of Pennsylvania who served as the 20th lieutenant governor of Pennsylvania from 1951 to 1955. He served in the Pennsylvania State Senate for the 12th district from 1947 to 1951 and in the Pennsylvania House of Representatives for the Montgomery County district from 1939 to 1946.

== Early life and education ==
Wood was born in Grampian, Pennsylvania, to George L. and Maude (Goss) Wood. He graduated from Central High School in Winchester Township and received a B.S. degree from Ursinus College and a LL.B from Temple University.

He served as a corporal in the United States Marine Corps in both World War I and World War II.

== Career ==
He worked as attorney-at-law for the Montgomery County Republican Committee and served as a member of the Pennsylvania House of Representatives for the Montgomery County district from 1939 to 1946. He resigned from the House on February 11, 1946, and served in the Pennsylvania State Senate from 1947 to 1951.

He served as the 20th Lieutenant Governor of Pennsylvania from 1951 to 1955 under Governor John Fine. He had an unsuccessful campaign for Governor of Pennsylvania in 1955.

He was elected Chief Clerk of the Pennsylvania House of Representatives and served from 1957 to 1959.

He died on February 15, 1964, and is interred at Riverside Cemetery in West Norriton Township, Pennsylvania.

Pennsylvania House of Representatives
Preceded by	Member of the Pennsylvania House of Representatives from Montgomery County; 1939-1946	Succeeded by
Pennsylvania State Senate
Preceded by Franklin Edwards	Member of the Pennsylvania Senate, 12th district 1947-1951	Succeeded by Henry Propert
Political offices
Preceded by Daniel Strickler	Lieutenant Governor of Pennsylvania; 1951–1955	Succeeded by Roy Furman
Party political offices
Preceded by Daniel Strickler	Republican nominee for Lieutenant Governor of Pennsylvania; 1950	Succeeded by Frank Truscott
Preceded by John Fine	Republican nominee for Governor of Pennsylvania; 1954	Succeeded by Arthur McGonigle
