= Black Fury (film) =

1935 film by Michael Curtiz

- Directed by: Michael Curtiz
- Written by: Abem Finkel; Carl Erickson
- Story by: Michael A. Musmanno
- Based on: Bohunk play by Harry R. Irving; Jan Volkanik by Judge M. A. Musmanno
- Produced by: Hal B. Wallis (uncredited executive producer); Jack L. Warner (uncredited executive producer)
- Starring: Paul Muni; Karen Morley; William Gargan
- Cinematography: Byron Haskin
- Edited by: Thomas Richards
- Music by: Bernhard Kaun
- Production company: Warner Bros. Pictures
- Distributed by: Warner Bros. Pictures
- Release date: May 18, 1935
- Running time: 94 minutes
- Country: United States
- Language: English

Black Fury is a 1935 American crime film directed by Michael Curtiz, and starring Paul Muni, Karen Morley, and William Gargan. It was adapted by Abem Finkel and Carl Erickson from the short story "Jan Volkanik" by Judge Michael A. Musmanno, and the play Bohunk by Harry R. Irving. The plot is based on a historic incident during a Pennsylvania walk-out in 1929, in which John Barkowski, a striking coal miner, was beaten to death by private company police.

In 1936, at the 8th Academy Awards, Muni was not officially nominated for the Academy Award for Best Actor, but he came in second on the basis of write-in votes, which were allowed that year.

== Plot ==
Set in Pennsylvania coal country, the film tells the story of Joe Radek, a miner of Slavic background. Upset after an argument with his girlfriend Anna Novak, he drinks and attends a union meeting, where he acts as a catalyst to splitting the union members into radical and moderate factions; radically inclined miners decide to walk out and strike, the others led by Radek's best friend Mike Shemanski stay at work. Meanwhile, the company brings in a private police force cobbled out of thugs by a Pinkerton-type detective agency.

One night, when three drunk company cops attempt to rape Shemanski's daughter, both friends reunite in defending her honor. During the fight, Shemanski is killed by McGee, and Radek is injured and hospitalized. While he is recovering, the strike ends with no results and Shemanski's murder stays unpunished. Angry, Radek collects dynamite and provision and decides to start his own underground protest by hiding in the mine during the daytime and blowing up company property at night. His exploits draw the national attention after being reported by the media. Corrupted company cops are trying to catch Radek in the mine; he fights back with dynamite sticks and accidentally seals himself and Shemanski's murderer McGee in a mine tunnel. After an epic fight Radek emerges from the mine with the subdued and handcuffed company policeman to deliver him to justice, and as a winner in the court of public opinion he is able to influence a more favorable union contract for his mining buddies, making amends with his girlfriend as well.

== Cast ==
- Paul Muni as Joe Radek
- Karen Morley as Anna Novak
- William Gargan as Slim Johnson
- Barton MacLane as McGee
- John Qualen as Mike Shemanski (credited as John T. Qualen)
- J. Carrol Naish as Steve Croner (credited as J. Carroll Naish)
- Vince Barnett as Kubanda
- Tully Marshall as Tommy Poole
- Henry O'Neill as John W. Hendricks
- Joseph Crehan as Johnny Farrell (credited as Joe Crehan)
- Mae Marsh as Mrs. Mary Novak
- Sara Haden as Sophie Shemanski (credited as Sarah Haden)
- Willard Robertson as Mr. J.J. Welsh
- Effie Ellsler as Bubitschka
- Wade Boteler as Mulligan
- Egon Brecher as Alec Novak
- G. Pat Collins as Lefty, a Company Policeman (credited as George Pat Collins)
- Ward Bond as Mac, a Company Policeman
- Akim Tamiroff as Sokolsky (credited as Akin Tamiroff)
- Purnell Pratt as Henry B. Jenkins
- Eddie Shubert as Butch

== Production ==
Pennsylvania state legislator and former coal miner Michael Musmanno acted to ban the private Coal and Iron Police after the murder of miner John Barkoski in Imperial, Pennsylvania, in 1929. Later he wrote a short story about the incident changing the name of the miner to "Jan Volkanik." Musmanno's story and the play Bohunk by Harry R. Irving (1894–1960) were adapted for the film in a screenplay written by Abem Finkel and Carl Erickson. In Black Fury, John Barkoski is fictionalized as Mike Shemanski. In 1966, Musmanno published a novel version of the screenplay also named Black Fury.

== Reception ==
Andre David Sennwald Jr. of The New York Times wrote in April 1935, "Magnificently performed by Paul Muni, it comes up taut against the censorial safety belts and tells a stirring tale of industrial war in the coal fields." He described it as "the most notable American experiment in social drama since Our Daily Bread.'" The film was banned in several American states as inciting social conflict.

== Honors ==
In 1936, a year in which the Academy Awards accepted write-in votes, Paul Muni came in second for Best Actor for his performance.
