= Leaders Heights, Pennsylvania =

Unincorporated area in Pennsylvania, US

Leader Heights, Pennsylvania
- Unincorporated community
- Location within Pennsylvania
- Coordinates: 39°54′23″N 76°43′08″W
- Country: United States
- State: Pennsylvania
- County: York
- Elevation: 722 ft (220 m)
- Time zone: UTC-5 (Eastern (EST))
  - Summer (DST): UTC-4 (EDT)
- Area code: 717
- GNIS feature ID: 1179080

Leader Heights is an unincorporated community in York Township, York County, Pennsylvania, United States.
