= Black Fury (novel) =

1966 novel by Michael Musmanno

- First edition
- Author: Michael Musmanno
- Language: English
- Genre: Proletarian literature
- Publisher: Fountainhead Publishers
- Publication date: 1966
- Publication place: United States
- Media type: Print (hardback)
- Pages: 391
- OCLC: 1600729

Black Fury is an historical novel by the American writer and judge Michael Musmanno. The novel was developed from his script for the 1935 film of the same name, Black Fury.

The concept for Black Fury was adapted from the short story "Jan Volkanik" by Musmanno and the play Bohunk by Harry R. Irving, based on an actual 1929 incident in which John Barkoski, a striking coal miner, was beaten to death by company detectives.

Set in the Western Pennsylvania coal fields outside of Pittsburgh, the novel is the story of Jan Volkanik, a miner who agitates for recognition of the United Mine Workers of America.
