= John S. Fine =

American politician (1893–1978)

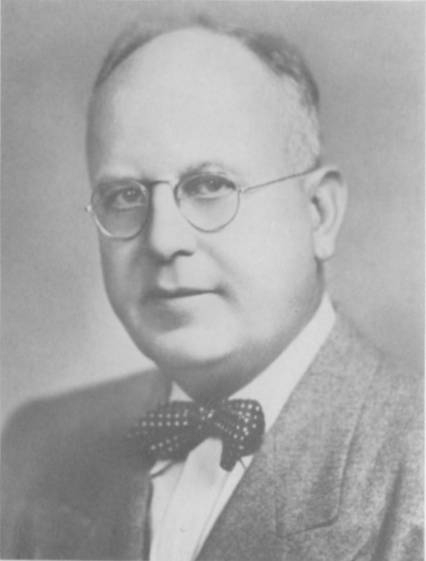

35th Governor of Pennsylvania
- In office January 16, 1951 – January 18, 1955
- Lieutenant: Lloyd Wood
- Preceded by: James Duff
- Succeeded by: George Leader

Personal details
- Born: John Sydney Fine; April 10, 1893 Newport Township, Pennsylvania, U.S.
- Died: May 21, 1978 (aged 85) Wilkes-Barre, Pennsylvania, U.S.
- Party: Republican
- Spouses: Helene Pennebecker Morgan (m. 1939; died 1951); Bernice Johnson
- Children: 2
- Education: Dickinson School of Law
- Profession: Attorney, Judge

John Sydney Fine (April 10, 1893 – May 21, 1978) was an American lawyer, judge, and politician. A Republican, he served as the 35th governor of Pennsylvania from 1951 to 1955.

== Early life ==
Fine was born in Newport Township, Pennsylvania, one of nine children of Jacob W. and Margaret (née Croop) Fine. In 1895, the family moved to nearby Nanticoke, where Fine received his early education at local public schools. He milked cows and plowed fields on a coal company farm as a young boy, and he later reported on local community news for the Wilkes-Barre Record as a teenager.

After graduating from Nanticoke High School as valedictorian in 1911, Fine studied at the Dickinson School of Law in Carlisle, earning his law degree in 1914. He was admitted to practice law in Luzerne County (1914) and before the Superior Court of Pennsylvania (1915). He opened his own practice in Wilkes-Barre. From 1916 to 1920, he served as Republican chairman of the Fourth Legislative District of Luzerne County.

== Military career ==
During World War I, Fine served with the 23rd US Army Engineers, reaching the rank of sergeant. In 1919, while he was stationed in Ireland, he took postgraduate studies at Trinity College Dublin. After his military service, he resumed his law practice and became a partner in the law firm Coughlin and Fine.

== Political career ==
Portrait of Fine.

He served as secretary of the Republican County Committee from 1920 to 1922 and as chairman of the Luzerne County Republican Committee from 1922 to 1923. On January 3, 1927, Governor Gifford Pinchot appointed Fine to fill a vacancy in the Court of Common Pleas of Luzerne County. He was elected to a regular ten-year term in November of that year and was re-elected to another term in 1939. He served as a delegate to the 1936 Republican National Convention. In 1939, he married Helene Pennebecker Morgan and he remained married to her until her death in 1951; the couple had two sons.

In 1942, Fine was an unsuccessful candidate for the Republican nomination to the Supreme Court of Pennsylvania. Governor James H. Duff appointed him to fill a vacancy on the Pennsylvania Superior Court on July 15, 1947. He was elected to a permanent term in November 1947, serving in that position until he resigned in 1950 to campaign for governor.

In 1950, after Duff decided to run for the US Senate, Fine was elected the 35th Governor of Pennsylvania. In the Republican primary, Fine, the favored candidate of Duff, defeated Philadelphia millionaire Jay Cooke, the favored candidate of the conservative machine of Joseph R. Grundy. In the general election, he narrowly defeated Democrat Richardson Dilworth, who would later become the mayor of Philadelphia, by 86,000 votes.

Fine was the first Pennsylvania governor to have his inauguration televised.

== Personal life ==
Fine married Helen Pennebacker Morgan (d. 1951) in 1939. He later married Bernice Johnson.

In 1962, Fine was indicted for evading payment of $45,000 in taxes. The Newport Excavation Co. allegedly paid for improvements on his farm along with salaries to two of his farmhands considered taxable income. Fine claimed ignorance to these issues and the Governor of Pennsylvania, David L. Lawrence, testified as a character witness in Federal Court on behalf of ex-Gov Fine. As a result, he was found not guilty. After the verdict was read Mrs. Fine said she was "thrilled and elated no end".

Fine died at Wilkes-Barre General Hospital on May 21, 1978, at the age of 85.

Political offices
| Preceded by James Duff | Governor of Pennsylvania; 1951–1955 | Succeeded by George Leader |
Party political offices
| Preceded by James Duff | Republican nominee for Governor of Pennsylvania; 1950 | Succeeded by Lloyd Wood |
