= Edmund Bacon (architect) =

American urban planner and architect (1910–2005)

- Born: Edmund Norwood Bacon; May 2, 1910; Philadelphia, Pennsylvania, U.S.
- Died: October 14, 2005 (aged 95)
- Education: Cornell University; Cranbrook Academy of Art
- Occupations: Urban planner, architect
- Spouse: Ruth Hilda Holmes
- Children: 6, including Kevin and Michael
- Relatives: Sosie Bacon (granddaughter); Kyra Sedgwick (daughter-in-law)

Edmund Norwood Bacon (May 2, 1910 – October 14, 2005) was an American urban planner, architect, educator, and author. During his tenure as the executive director of the Philadelphia City Planning Commission from 1949 to 1970, his visions shaped today's Philadelphia, the city of his birth, to the extent that he is sometimes described as "The Father of Modern Philadelphia". He authored the seminal urban planning book Design of Cities. He was the father of actor Kevin Bacon.

== Early life and education ==
Bacon was born in West Philadelphia, the son of Helen Atkinson (née Comly) and Ellis Williams Bacon. He grew up in the Philadelphia suburbs and graduated from Swarthmore High School in Swarthmore, Pennsylvania in 1928.

He attended Cornell University, where he studied architecture. His senior thesis at Cornell made the case for a new civic center for Philadelphia that included an urban park where LOVE Park was ultimately built.

After college, while traveling the world on a small inheritance, Bacon found work as an architect in Shanghai, China, in Henry Murphy's office. He was responsible for designing the Nanjing Dajiaochang Airport. With Murphy, he visited Beijing, a city that exerted a deep influence on his thinking. After a year in China, he returned to Philadelphia where he worked for architect William Pope Barney.

He soon was awarded a scholarship to the Cranbrook Academy of Art, in Bloomfield Hills, Michigan, with Finnish architect and planner Eliel Saarinen, who Bacon revered and whose theories about the city as a living organism as expressed in Saarinen's book The City were a basis for Bacon's later work.

== Career ==
=== Works Progress Administration ===
Saarinen sent Bacon to Flint, Michigan to guide a WPA traffic survey. This project transformed into a permanent position for Bacon at the Flint Institute for Planning and Research. Bacon became very active in civic life in Flint, helping to establish the Flint Housing Association and reforming the city's Planning Commission. During his time in Flint, Bacon witnessed the 1936-37 Flint Sit-Down Strike, and felt empathetic to the workers.

Bacon gained close contacts with individuals who were active in establishing the Federal Housing Authority, such as Catherine Bauer and Lewis Mumford. Through these contacts he helped secure federal housing dollars for Flint. Bacon convened a housing council that brought together business, labor and civic interest groups in hopes of funding a public housing project. However, the local real-estate industry came to see this Federal funding for public housing as a threat to their business of selling converted garages to workers as homes, as was the case in several cities early in the history of the FHA, and the automobile unions helped kill the initiative. Bacon and other members of the council who remained in support of the project were red-baited, the funding was turned down, and Bacon was effectively run out of Flint in 1939.

=== Philadelphia Housing Association ===
From Flint, Bacon returned to Philadelphia, where he resided at 2117 Locust Street. In Philadelphia, he served as managing director of the Philadelphia Housing Association. He served in the United States Navy aboard the USS Shoshone in the Pacific in World War II. In 1947, he joined the staff of the Philadelphia City Planning Commission under executive director Robert Mitchell, and served as co-designer to the 1947 Better Philadelphia Exhibition in collaboration with Oscar Stonorov and Louis Kahn. Bacon was also an early member of the City Policy Committee, a grassroots movement of young Philadelphians, established by future civic leader Walter M. Phillips, that was instrumental in Philadelphia's political reform movement. Members of the Committee went on to become leaders in Philadelphia government after 1952, when the reform Democrat and later (U.S. Senator) Joseph Sill Clark was elected Mayor, Richardson Dilworth became District Attorney, and a new Home Rule Charter was instituted.

In 1949, Bacon succeeded Mitchell as executive director of the Philadelphia City Planning Commission. Serving under Mayors Samuel, Clark, Dilworth, and Tate, his work brought him national repute along with his counterparts Edward J. Logue in Boston and Robert Moses in New York City during the mid-century era of urban renewal. His face appeared on the cover of Time magazine in 1964, and in 1965, Life magazine devoted its cover story to his work.

That same year, Bacon was appointed by President Johnson to serve as a member of the White House's Conference on Recreation and Natural Beauty. In 1967, he wrote Design of Cities, still considered an important architectural text. It's a seminal work on urban design that illustrates the relationship between historical and modern principles as well as practices of urban planning, applied particularly to Philadelphia.

It was during his tenure at the City Planning Commission that Bacon and his staff conceived and implemented numerous large and small-scale design ideas that shaped today's Philadelphia. These design concepts became Penn Center, Market East, Penn's Landing, Society Hill, Independence Mall and the Far Northeast. The Center City Commuter Connection, a seemingly radical idea at the time, was conceived during the 1950s by Planning Commission staff member, R. Damon Childs, who succeeded Bacon as executive director.

Not all of the concepts that Bacon supported materialized. One proposal that he inherited from Robert Mitchell was to encircle Center City with a series of expressways, including the so-called Crosstown Expressway (I-695) and the Vine Street Expressway (I-676) linking the Schuylkill Expressway (I-76) with the Delaware Expressway (I-95) via South Street. Three of the four expressways were built, however the Crosstown Expressway faced significant local opposition and was never built, while a scaled-down expressway was built at Vine Street.

As an unintended consequence, the Crosstown Expressway proposal depressed property values and rents in the South Street corridor, leading to a turnover of the neighborhood's character from largely Jewish-owned garment shops to the thriving commercial and nightlife center that it is today. Other concepts conceived during Bacon's tenure, such as Schuylkill River Park, included in the 1963 Center City Plan, came into being many years later.

=== Academia ===
After Bacon's retirement from the Planning Commission in 1970, he served as vice president for the private planning firm Mondev U.S.A., was an adjunct professor at the University of Illinois at Urbana-Champaign and at the University of Pennsylvania, from 1950 to 1987, and narrated "Understanding Cities", an award-winning series of documentary films describing the history and development of Rome under Pope Sixtus V, Paris under Georges-Eugène Haussmann, Regency London under John Nash, American cities, and cities in the future post-oil era. He vociferously but unsuccessfully opposed the development of skyscrapers in Center City, Philadelphia taller than Philadelphia City Hall, which until 1984 set the informal height limit for downtown at the hat of the statue of William Penn. That custom, known as the "Gentlemen's agreement", was broken by developer Willard G. Rouse III's One Liberty Place. The New York Times correctly noted Bacon's opposition to the project, but it was incorrect in saying that "in opposing the skyscraper One Liberty Place, Mr. Bacon refused to attend the tower's 1986 groundbreaking and stopped speaking to his friend Willard G. Rouse III, who built it. 'I think it's very, very destructive that he and he alone has chosen to destroy a historical tradition that set a very fine and disciplined form for the city,' Mr. Bacon said at the time." Bacon was present at the groundbreaking, which took place in May 1985. Of course, Rouse was not capable of single-handedly changing the custom, even if it was not formally legal. Rouse's enormous project had the support of Mayor W. Wilson Goode, Philadelphia City Council, and the City Planning Commission, which was forced by the announcement of Rouse's plan to admit that it had no up-to-date plan of its own for the future of Philadelphia's downtown.

Bacon continued to assert his vision for Philadelphia's future actively in his later years. During the 1990s, he proposed new concepts to improve Independence Mall, Penn's Landing, and the Benjamin Franklin Parkway. During the same period, he promoted a design competition for North American cities to design the best "Post-Petroleum" city. Only one municipality, in Ottawa, Canada, committed to it. In 2002, at age 92, he skateboarded in LOVE Park, the plaza he founded and designed at Cornell University in 1932, as a protest against the city's ban on skateboarding in the park.

In 2003, he appeared in the documentary My Architect about Louis Kahn, a Philadelphia architect. In September 2006, at the northwest corner of 15th Street and J.F.K. Boulevard, by LOVE Park, The Ed Bacon Foundation and the Pennsylvania Historical and Museum Commission dedicated a state historical marker honoring Bacon's memory and commemorating his work.

== Awards ==
Bacon was awarded the Frank P. Brown Medal in 1962, the American Institute of Planners Distinguished Service Award, the Philadelphia Award, and an honorary doctorate from the University of Pennsylvania. In 1983, Bacon was elected into the National Academy of Design as an associate member, and became a full member in 1994. A sign was erected in his honor on Spruce Street between 3rd and 4th Streets in Philadelphia, PA, by the Society Hill Civic Association, for Bacon's design of “Greenways” (walkways between busy streets). From 2004 until his death at the age of 95 the following year, Bacon helped found and served as an honorary director of a foundation that bears his name, the Ed Bacon Foundation, whose programs are now managed by the Edmund N. Bacon Memorial Committee at the Philadelphia Center for Architecture.

== Personal life ==
Bacon was the father of six children, including two sons, actor Kevin Bacon and musician Michael Bacon, and four daughters, Karin, Elinor, Hilda and Prudence (later Kira). His wife was Ruth Hilda Holmes, a teacher and liberal political activist. His friends included Buckminster Fuller, Steen Eiler Rasmussen, James Rouse, and Konstantinos Apostolos Doxiadis.

== Works ==
- Design of Cities (May 20, 1976) Penguin. ISBN 0-14-004236-9
- Understanding Cities documentary film series (1981)
- Greg Heller, Ed Bacon: Planning, Politics, and the Building of Modern Philadelphia. (Philadelphia: University of Pennsylvania Press, 2013)
