= Richardson Dilworth =

American politician (1898–1974)

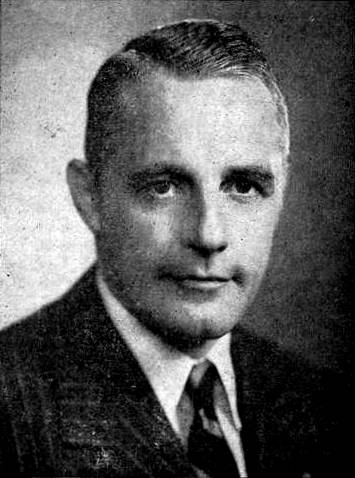
- Dilworth in 1947

91st Mayor of Philadelphia
- In office January 2, 1956 – February 12, 1962
- Preceded by: Joseph S. Clark Jr.
- Succeeded by: James Tate

34th President of the National League of Cities
- In office August 1961 – January 1962
- Preceded by: Don Hummel
- Succeeded by: Gordon S. Clinton

17th President of the United States Conference of Mayors
- In office 1960–1961
- Preceded by: Richard J. Daley
- Succeeded by: W. Haydon Burns

16th District Attorney of Philadelphia
- In office January 7, 1952 – January 2, 1956
- Preceded by: John Maurer
- Succeeded by: Victor H. Blanc

Personal details
- Born: August 29, 1898 Pittsburgh, Pennsylvania, U.S.
- Died: January 23, 1974 (aged 75) Philadelphia, Pennsylvania, U.S.
- Party: Democratic
- Spouses: Elizabeth Brockie (m. 1922; div. 1935); Ann Elizabeth Kaufman (m. 1935)
- Children: 6
- Education: Yale University

Military service
- Allegiance: United States
- Branch/service: United States Marine Corps
- Rank: Major
- Battles/wars: World War I World War II

Richardson K. Dilworth (August 29, 1898 – January 23, 1974) was an American Democratic Party politician who served as the 91st mayor of Philadelphia from 1956 to 1962. He twice ran as the Democratic nominee for governor of Pennsylvania, in 1950 and in 1962. He is to date the last White Anglo-Saxon Protestant mayor of Philadelphia.

== Education and early career ==
He was born in Pittsburgh to Joseph Richardson Dilworth and Annie Hunter (Wood) Dilworth. He enlisted in the Marine Corps in World War I and was commissioned as an officer in World War II. In 1938, he joined the law firm of Dilworth Paxson. In 1921 he graduated from Yale University, where he was a member of Scroll and Key and Delta Kappa Epsilon, and lettered for the varsity football team. In 1926 he graduated from Yale Law School, afterwards becoming an attorney in Philadelphia. He was married to the former Elizabeth Brockie from 1922 to 1935, and they had four children. On August 6, 1935, a week after divorcing his first wife, he married Ann Elizabeth Kaufman. They had two children.

== Political career ==
Dilworth had grown up as a Republican, but became a Democrat out of frustration with the city's longstanding Republican machine. Along with Joseph S. Clark Jr. and others, he was at the forefront of a post-World War II reform movement in Philadelphia that led to the adoption of a modern city charter that consolidated city and county offices and introduced civil service examinations on a broad scale to replace much of the existing patronage system.

Dilworth initially ran for mayor in 1947 against incumbent Republican Barney Samuel. Samuel was seeking his second full term in office, after assuming office following the death of Robert Lamberton in 1941. Dilworth was ultimately defeated by over 90,000 votes; however, the election marked the last time, to date, that a Republican was elected mayor of Philadelphia. In 1949, Dilworth was elected city treasurer, while Clark was elected city controller. Dilworth ran for governor in the 1950 election, losing a close race to John S. Fine. In 1951, he was elected Philadelphia District Attorney, while Clark was elected mayor. Clark and Dilworth's inaugurations ended a 67-year period of uninterrupted Republican control of the city (and instituted a period of uninterrupted Democratic control which has persisted past 2022). In 1955, Dilworth was elected mayor, defeating Thacher Longstreth.

During their tenures as mayor, Clark and Dilworth introduced a variety of reforms and innovations. Among these was extensive high-rise public housing which would, a generation later, be condemned by many as a breeding ground for poverty and crime. However, they also greatly strengthened the city planning function of Philadelphia city government. Both retained Edmund Bacon as executive director of the Philadelphia City Planning Commission, and the Clark–Dilworth era is recognized as a high-water mark for planning, during which the decline of Center City, Philadelphia as a commercial and residential center was reversed and priority was given (particularly during Dilworth's administration) to saving the city's historic and irreplaceable Society Hill district. Dilworth resigned as mayor on February 12, 1962, to launch a second bid for governor.

Despite President John F. Kennedy's work on his behalf, Dilworth lost the fall general election by a half million votes to progressive Republican Congressman William Scranton, in what scholars considered "one of the bitterest [campaigns] in Pennsylvania history." Scranton had run for governor (with fellow progressive Raymond P. Shafer for lieutenant governor) after a deeply divisive Republican primary involving Philadelphia Republican boss Billy Meehan's candidate, Judge Robert E. Woodside; and five other candidates. Republicans also carried both houses of the state legislature in that landslide election.

In 1960 and 1961, Dilworth served as president of the United States Conference of Mayors. A 1993 survey of historians, political scientists and urban experts conducted by Melvin G. Holli of the University of Illinois at Chicago ranked Dilworth as the eleventh-best American big-city mayor to have served between 1820 and 1993.

== SS Andrea Doria ==
With his wife, Ann Dilworth, he was a passenger on the SS Andrea Doria, an ocean liner that collided with the MS Stockholm near Nantucket, Massachusetts, on July 25, 1956, and subsequently sank. They were saved, and Dilworth was on board the last lifeboat that was picked up by the SS Île de France. He had aided in the evacuation of other passengers from the ship.

== After being mayor ==
Following his tenure as mayor, Dilworth served as partner in the Philadelphia-based law firm of Dilworth Paxson LLP, which bears his name. He also served as president of the Philadelphia School Board, and in 1971 was appointed one of two bankruptcy trustees (along with Drew Lewis) for the Reading Company, a railroad company headquartered in Philadelphia.

Dilworth died from a brain tumor at Pennsylvania Hospital in Philadelphia on January 23, 1974, at the age of 75.

Dilworth Park, adjacent to Philadelphia City Hall, is named in his honor.

An abstract "rising phoenix" made by sculptor Emlen Etting in 1982 is a memorial to the Mayor; it was moved from its original location at North end of Dilworth Plaza to 38th Parallel Place in 2013.

Political offices
Preceded by Joseph S. Clark Jr.	Mayor of Philadelphia; 1956–1962	Succeeded by James Tate
Legal offices
Preceded by John Maurer	District Attorney of Philadelphia, Pennsylvania; 1952–1956	Succeeded by Victor H. Blanc
Party political offices
Preceded by William Bullitt	Democratic nominee for Mayor of Philadelphia; 1947	Succeeded by Joseph S. Clark Jr.
Preceded by John Rice	Democratic nominee for Governor of Pennsylvania; 1950	Succeeded by George Leader
Preceded by Joseph S. Clark Jr.	Democratic nominee for Mayor of Philadelphia; 1955, 1959	Succeeded by James Tate
Preceded by David L. Lawrence	Democratic nominee for Governor of Pennsylvania; 1962	Succeeded by Milton Shapp
