= Design of Cities =

1967 book by Edmund Bacon

- Author: Edmund Bacon
- Language: English
- Subject: Urban planning, architecture
- Genre: Non-fiction
- Publisher: Thames & Hudson
- Publication date: 1967
- Publication place: United Kingdom
- Media type: Print
- Pages: 296 pp.
- ISBN: 0-14-004236-9
- OCLC: 901545668

Design of Cities, first published in 1967, is an illustrated account of the development of urban form, written by Edmund Bacon (1910–2005), who was the executive director of the Philadelphia City Planning Commission from 1949 to 1970. The work looks at the many aspects that influence city design, including spatial form, interactions between humans, nature and the built environment, perception of favorable environments, color, and perspective. Bacon also explores the growth of cities from early Greek and Roman times to Philadelphia's design in the 1960s. It is considered a seminal text on urban planning.

== Bacon's Elements of Involvement ==
Bacon identifies eight elements of 'Involvement' in Architecture and Urban Design. To identify these elements, Bacon utilizes Francesco Guardi's painting Architectural Capriccio. Describing these elements as functions of design, he argues the urban designer should be aware of these elements and use them as tools when developing a 'design idea' of what the city or place ought to look like.

=== Meeting the Sky ===
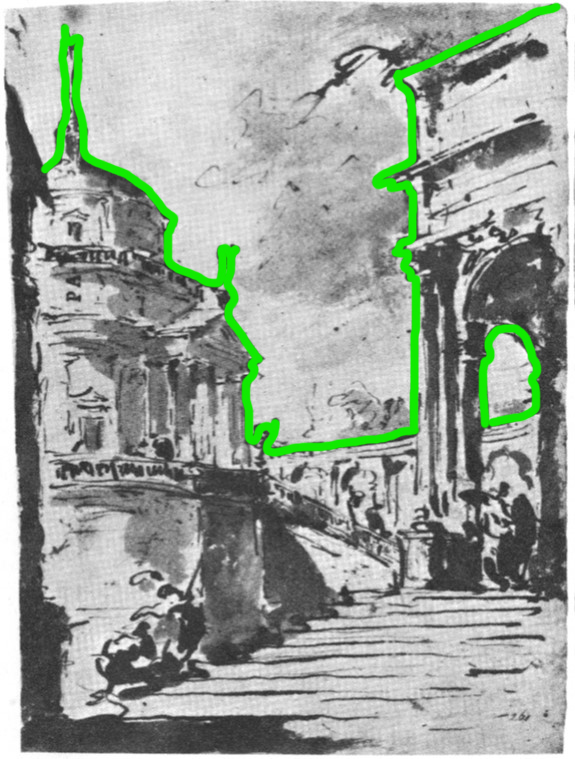
Meeting the Sky

Bacon points to akroterion of Greek temples as an excellent example of how buildings and built form meet the sky. He points to a revival of this style in the Baroque and Victorian period, and comments that this element is an identical to a city skyline, which he identifies as a city's signature.

=== Meeting the Ground ===
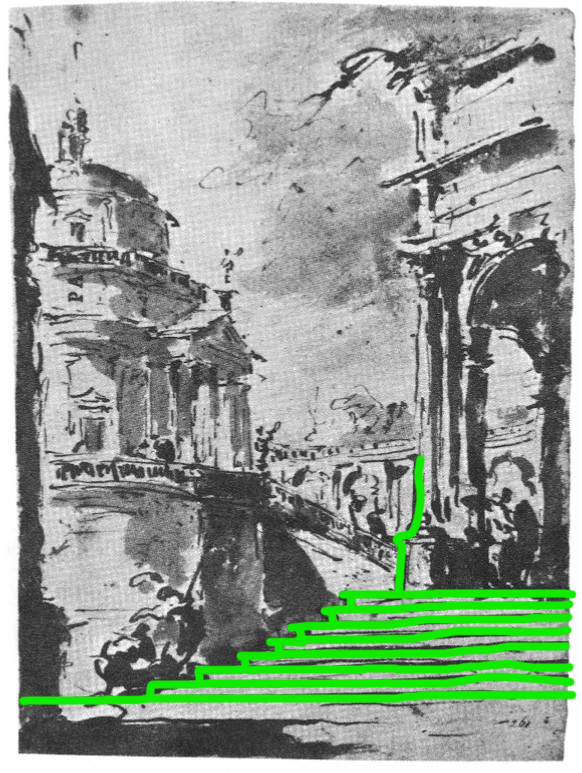
Meeting the Ground

Bacon argues that this second element is where built mass meets the ground to act as a pedestal for built form. This pedestal allows the involved to scale buildings and relate their size to one another. Bacon points to buildings that utilized staircases as pedestals in the Renaissance period, and notes that many of these were placed at the focal point of cities, such as city squares and town commons.

=== Points in Space ===
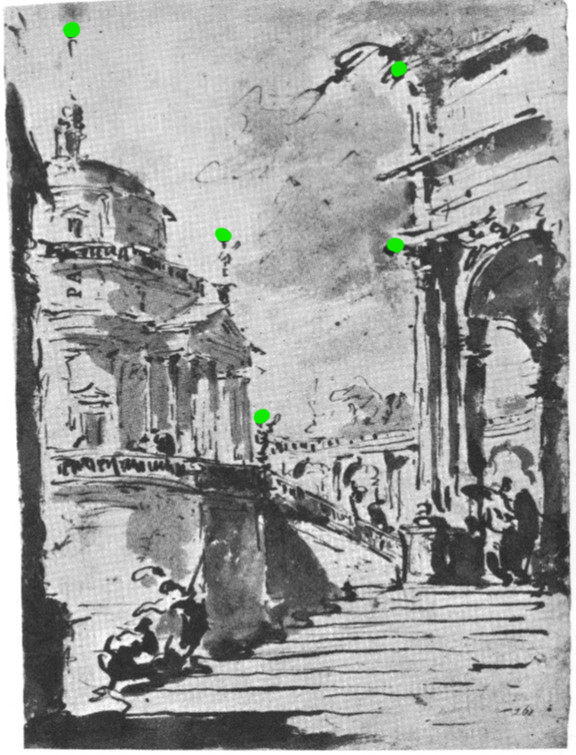
Points in Space

Bacon's third element is used to create tension and relief between elements. He argues great places have prominent points in space that are identifiable work to interplay with other elements.

=== Recession Planes ===
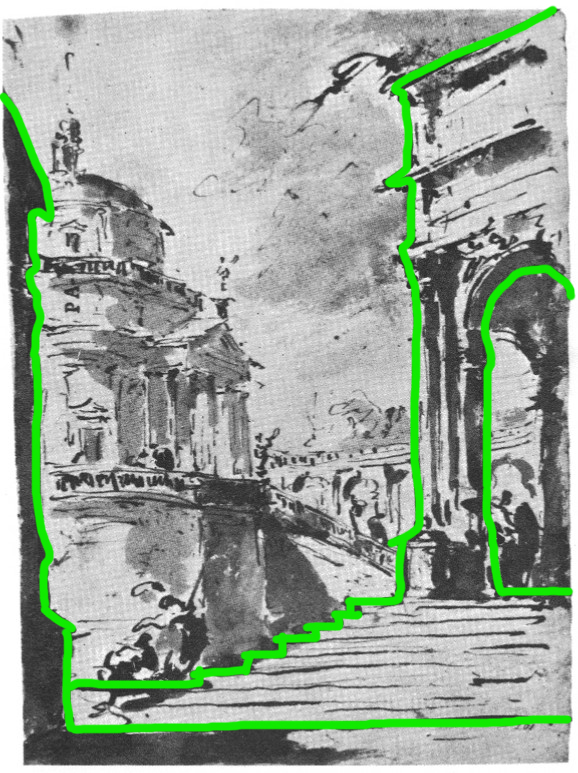
Recession Planes

Recession planes are used in urban form to heighten dramatic power of structures. This is done by allowing the involved viewer to have a reference to scale, frame and position relative to the viewer.

=== Design in Depth ===
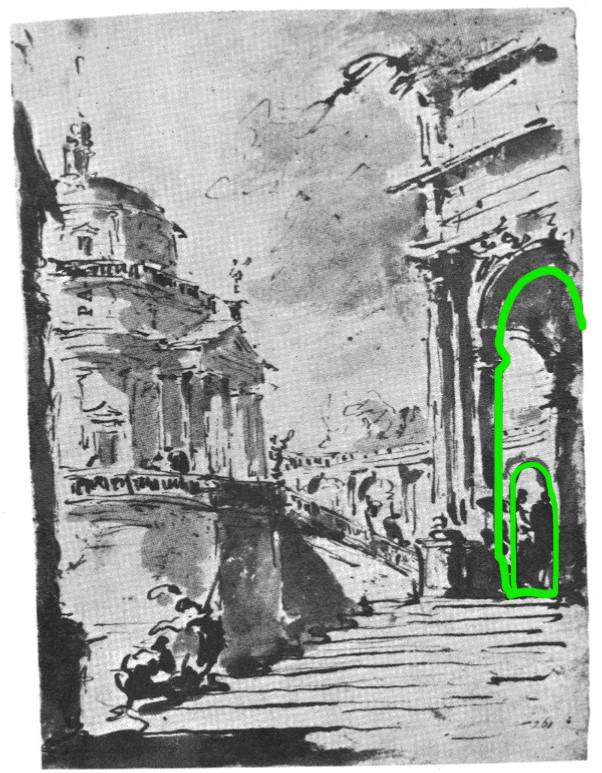
Design in Depth

Relating two arches to one another allows the involved viewer to understand the depth of buildings, provide scale for that depth, and identify egress areas. Designing in depth creates urban movement, that allows space to be understood from multiple perspectives. It also lends further credence to the determination and coherence of scale.

=== Ascent and Descent ===
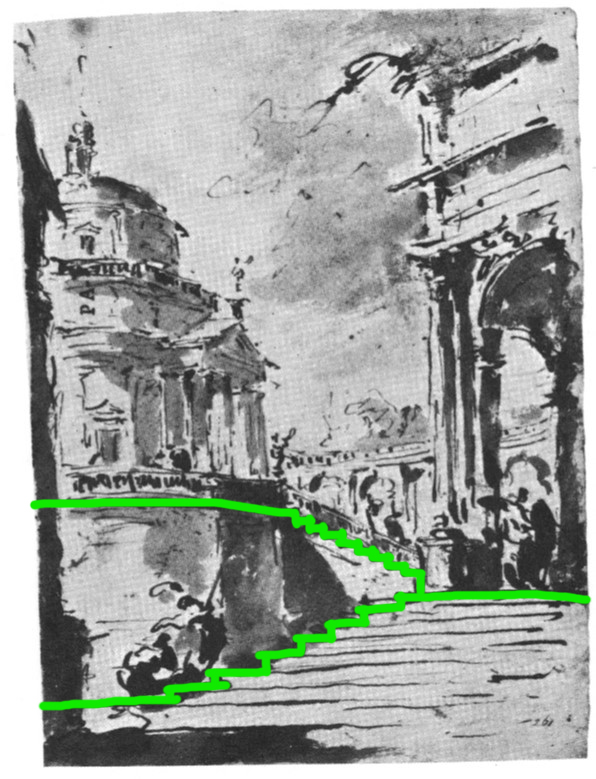
Ascent and Descent

By varying levels of floor, designers have the ability to toy with emotions of the involved viewer. Upward movement has can symbolize power, achievement, or anticipation. Downward movement can symbolize the depth and grandeur of space. Bacon argues that as citizens change levels, new aspects of the urban form reveal themselves and as mechanical design elements work to replicate sequences of urban form. Furthermore, these two aspects of the same element exist in duality and also aid in creating spatial tension.

=== Convexity and Concavity ===
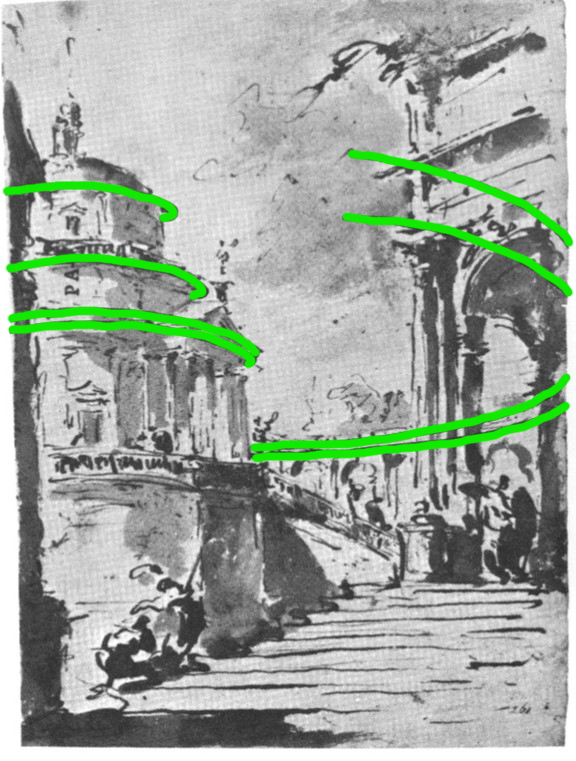
Convexity and Concavity

Much like ascent and descent, these mirrored aspects of the same element heavily rely on one another. Working with the depth of built form, convexity and concavity act as connector and divider of urban space. They inform the volume of urban form and can be taken advantage of to make urban form more dramatic.

=== Relationship to Man ===
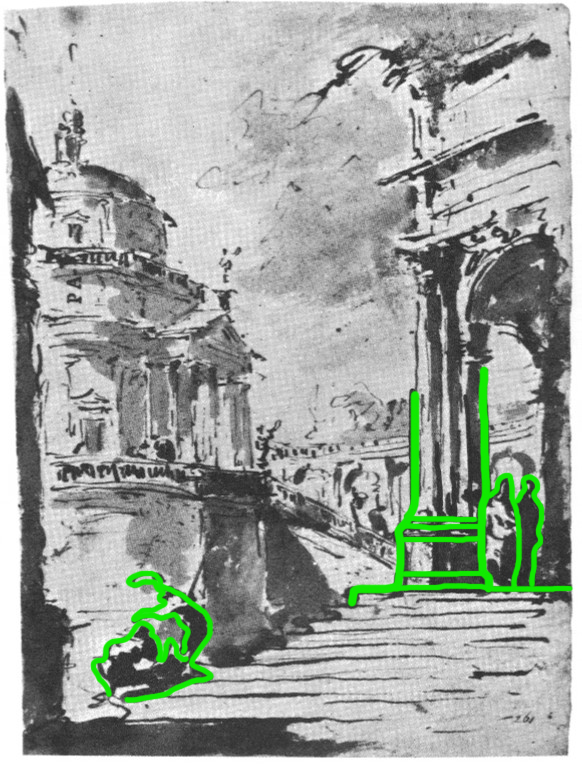
Relationship to Man

One of the most critical pieces of Bacon's work is the identification and reiteration of built forms relationship to man. Bacon argues that our urban built form should be reflective of our human scale and aid in establishing a connection between built environment and man. If this is done artfully, buildings and their relationship to man benefit urban form.
