= Better Philadelphia Exhibition =

Fair in Philadelphia

The Better Philadelphia Exhibition was a 1947 urban planning showcase held at the Gimbels Department store in Center City. The exhibition aimed to guide Philadelphia's postwar future socially, economically, and physically through ambitious plans for urban renewal and modern city planning.

== Background ==
While a planning commission was formed in the city in 1911, throughout the 1920s and 1930s the group failed to produce meaningful results. By the 1940s the city's funded debt was more than $500,000,000, with barely and borrowing capacity. The postwar society in the United States of America placed major infrastructure and overcrowding problems on cities. However, the victory of the Allied Powers in World War II gave cities the inspiration to improve. Opening on September 8, 1947, and running through October 15, the exhibition presented proposals connected to a $300 million capital improvement program aimed at reshaping the city's urban landscape.

== Organizers ==
The idea for this exhibition was first conceived by modernist architect Oskar Stonorov, who recruited the help of urban planner Edmund Bacon. Louis I. Khan, Robert Leonard, and Robert B. Mitchell also contributed to the display. Additionally, Stonorov secured adequate funding from prominent Philadelphians such as Mayor Bernard Samuel, Benjamin Rush Jr., Arthur Kauffman, Allan G. Mitchell, and George T. Eager raising more than $325,000 in private and public funds for the event.

== Stages ==
=== Stage One ===
Stage one showcased the growth of Philadelphia from William Penn's small founding town to a modern metropolis. This display feature a series of edge-lighted plexiglas planes that link each step of growth with the advent of a new mode of transportation.

=== Stage Two ===
Stage two showed the decay of Philadelphia neighborhoods with a display of a section of town deteriorating before viewers' eyes.

=== Stage Three ===
Stage Three showcased what would happen if decay in Philadelphia was not checked, displaying an illuminated view of Philadelphia burning out section by section.

=== Stage Four ===
Stage Four showcased how city planning can curb decay and promote redevelopment.

== Public reception ==
After the event, the Philadelphia City Planning Commission asked the 365,000 visitors how they felt about the displays. In response, nearly 65% of visitors claimed they would pay higher taxes in order to see the proposals of this exhibition come to fruition. By 1970, the only ideas that had not come to fruition was a crosstown expressway at South Street and a new ring highway system circling the city.
