= Bernard Samuel =

American politician

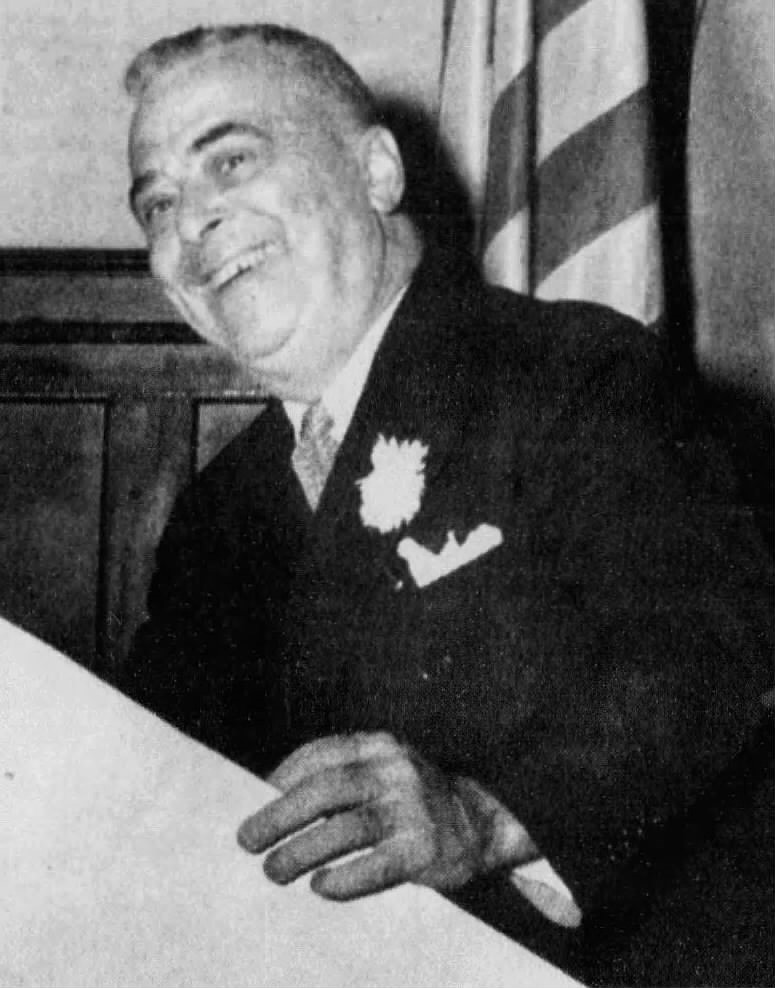
- Samuel in 1943

89th Mayor of Philadelphia
- In office August 22, 1941^{[a]} – January 7, 1952
- Preceded by: Robert Lamberton
- Succeeded by: Joe Clark

President of the Philadelphia City Council
- In office January 1, 1940 – January 3, 1944
- Preceded by: Himself^{[b]}
- Succeeded by: Andrew Kaelin

President pro tempore of the Philadelphia City Council
- In office August 19, 1939 – January 1, 1940
- Preceded by: George Connell^{[c]}
- Succeeded by: Himself

Personal details
- Born: March 9, 1880
- Died: January 12, 1954 (aged 73)
- Party: Republican
- Spouse: Eleanor Hann
- a.Acting Mayor from August 22, 1941 through January 3, 1944 b.As president pro tempore of the City Council c.As Council President

Bernard "Barney" Samuel (March 9, 1880 – January 12, 1954) was a Republican politician who served as the 89th mayor of Philadelphia from 1941 to 1952. He is to date the last Republican elected mayor of Philadelphia.

== Political career ==
=== Ascension to the office of mayor ===
Samuel first won election to city council in 1923. When in 1939 George Connell, then president of city council, became acting mayor upon the death of S. Davis Wilson, Samuel ascended to the position of president pro tempore. Upon the death in August 1941 of Mayor Robert Lamberton, however, Samuel assumed the mayoralty for the remainder of Lamberton's term.

=== Mayoral tenure ===
Mayor Samuel proclaims City Defense Week, November 24, 1941

Samuel won election and re-election to the mayor's office in 1943 and 1947, defeating Democrats William Bullitt and Richardson Dilworth respectively, to become the first multi-term mayor since William Stokley, who served from 1872 through 1881. His mayoral tenure was the longest in Philadelphia's history. He supported the creation of a city sales tax and was instrumental in creating a city wage tax. In defending the political machine he served, Samuel prepared the city for reform by endorsing creation of Philadelphia's highly touted City Planning Commission and supporting 1947's Better Philadelphia Exhibition, which subjected the failures of a "corrupt and contented" Republican political machine to harsh scrutiny and made the elections of 1949 and 1951 for city controller and mayor, respectively, landmarks in the city's political history.

==== 1944 transit strike ====
Samuel took an active role in trying to quell the 1944 transit strike that beset the city. He closed all alcohol-selling establishments, and Governor Edward Martin followed suit and closed the state liquor stores in the area. The city deployed its full police force, with extra police officers posted at major intersections and other vital points. The NAACP, as well as other black civic groups, worked energetically to maintain calm among the black people of Philadelphia. They distributed more than 100,000 posters in black sections of the city, which read "Keep Your Heads and Your Tempers! ... Treat other people as you would be treated". The six-day strike was triggered by the decision of the Philadelphia Transportation Company (PTC), made under prolonged pressure from the federal government in view of significant labor shortages, to allow black employees of the PTC to hold non-menial jobs, such as motormen and conductors, that were previously reserved for white workers only. It represents one of the most high-profile instances of the federal government invoking the Smith–Connally Act. The act had been passed in 1943 over President Roosevelt's veto.

Samuel was succeeded by Democrat reformist mayors Joe Clark, later a U.S. senator, and Richardson Dilworth, later a Democratic candidate for governor. He remains the last Republican mayor of Philadelphia.

Political offices
Preceded by Robert Lamberton	Mayor of Philadelphia^{1} 1941–1952	Succeeded by Joe Clark
Philadelphia City Council
Preceded by Himself^{2}	President of the Philadelphia City Council; 1940–1944	Succeeded by Andrew Kaelin
Preceded by George Connell^{3}	President pro tempore of the Philadelphia City Council; 1939–1940	Succeeded by Himself
Notes and references
1. Acting Mayor from 1941 through 1943; 2. As president pro tempore of the City Council; 3. As Council President
