= 1943 Philadelphia mayoral election =

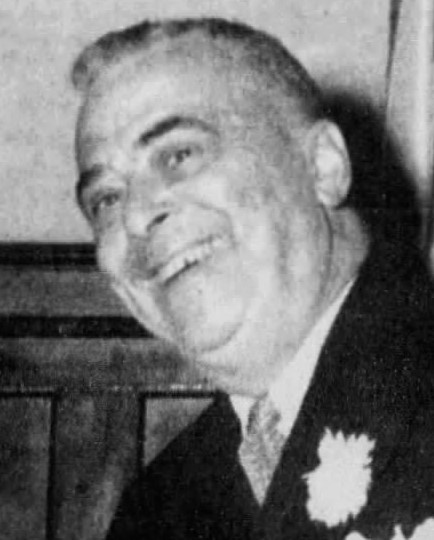

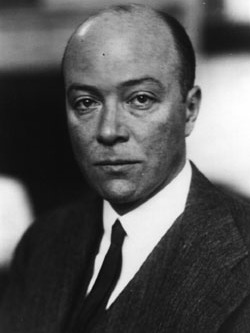
| Nominee | Bernard Samuel | William Christian Bullitt Jr. |
| Party | Republican | Democratic |
| Popular vote | 346,297 | 282,832 |
| Percentage | 55.04% | 44.96% |
Mayor before election
Bernard Samuel
Republican
Elected mayor
Bernard Samuel
Republican

A mayoral election was held in Philadelphia, Pennsylvania in 1943. The election saw the reelection of Bernard Samuel, who had taken office after the death of Robert Eneas Lamberton.

== General election ==
=== Candidates ===
- William Christian Bullitt Jr., former U.S. Ambassador to France and the Soviet Union (Democratic)
- Bernard Samuel, acting mayor since 1941 (Republican)

=== Results ===
1943 Philadelphia mayoral election (general election)
| Party | Candidate | Votes | % |
|---|---|---|---|
| Republican | Bernard Samuel (incumbent) | 346,297 | 55.04% |
| Democratic | William Christian Bullitt Jr. | 282,832 | 44.96% |
| Turnout | | 629,129 | |
