= 1947 Philadelphia mayoral election =

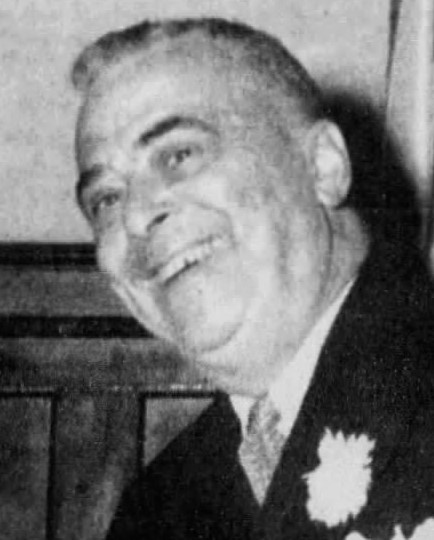

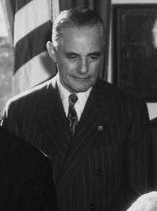
Nominee	Bernard Samuel	Richardson Dilworth
Party	Republican	Democratic
Popular vote	413,091	321,469
Percentage	56.25%	43.76%
Mayor before election
Bernard Samuel
Republican
Elected mayor
Bernard Samuel
Republican

The 1947 Philadelphia mayoral election saw the reelection of Bernard Samuel. To date, this is the last mayoral election in Philadelphia won by a Republican. Samuel defeated Democratic Party nominee, first-time candidate Richardson Dilworth. Dilworth would subsequently go on to be the unsuccessful Democratic Party nominee for governor of Pennsylvania in 1950 before being elected Philadelphia district attorney in 1951 and mayor of Philadelphia in 1955.

== General election ==
=== Candidates ===
- Richardson Dilworth, attorney and reform activist (Democratic)
- Bernard Samuel, incumbent mayor since 1941 (Republican)

=== Results ===
1947 Philadelphia mayoral election (general election)
Party	Candidate	Votes	%
Republican	Bernard Samuel (incumbent)	413,091	56.25%
Democratic	Richardson Dilworth	321,469	43.76%
Turnout		734,560	
