= William Christian Bullitt Jr. =

American diplomat (1891–1967)

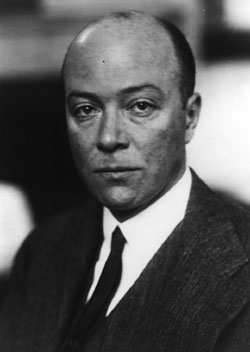

United States Ambassador to France
- In office October 13, 1936 – July 11, 1940
- President: Franklin D. Roosevelt
- Preceded by: Jesse I. Strauss
- Succeeded by: William D. Leahy

1st United States Ambassador to the Soviet Union
- In office December 13, 1933 – May 16, 1936
- President: Franklin D. Roosevelt
- Preceded by: David R. Francis (as Ambassador to Russia)
- Succeeded by: Joseph E. Davies

Personal details
- Born: January 25, 1891 Philadelphia, Pennsylvania, U.S.
- Died: February 15, 1967 (aged 76) Neuilly-sur-Seine, France
- Party: Republican (after 1948)
- Other political affiliations: Democratic (before 1948)
- Spouses: Aimee Ernesta Drinker (m. 1916; div. 1923) Louise Bryant (m. 1924; div. 1930)
- Children: 2

William Christian Bullitt Jr. (January 25, 1891 – February 15, 1967) was an American diplomat, journalist, and novelist. He is known for his special mission to negotiate with Lenin on behalf of the Paris Peace Conference, often recalled as a missed opportunity to normalize relations with the Bolsheviks. He was also the first U.S. ambassador to the Soviet Union and the U.S. ambassador to France during World War II. In his youth, he was considered a radical, but he later became an outspoken anticommunist.

== Early years ==
Bullitt was born to a prominent Philadelphia family, the son of Louisa Gross Horwitz and William Christian Bullitt Sr. His family was of French descent. His ancestor Joseph Boulet, a Huguenot, had fled Nîmes in 1629. Joseph Boulet settled in St. Mary's City in the English colony of Maryland in 1634, and the family later anglicized its surname to Bullitt. His grandfather was John Christian Bullitt, founder of the law firm today known as Drinker Biddle & Reath. John C. Bullitt was also the preferred legal counsel for Jay Cooke, a choice of client that made him into a very rich man. On his maternal side, Bullitt was descended from Haym Salomon, a Polish Jew who settled in Philadelphia in 1778. The descendants of Salomon later converted to Episcopalianism in the 19th century, and Bullitt's mother, Louisa Horwitz, was, despite her surname, an Episcopalian.

Bullitt's upbringing was cosmopolitan. Members of his family lived in the main European capitals, and he learned French and German at a very young age. As a boy, Bullitt spent every summer on a grand tour of Europe. Despite his upbringing, he always saw himself as an American first. Bullitt was staying in Paris during the Spanish-American War. During the war, he hung an American flag on the window of his room in his parents' Paris house to show his support for his country and wanted to attack the Spanish embassy in Paris, which his parents forbade, saying that as a seven year old, he was too young to take part in the war. As a child, he was considered a rebellious and rambunctious youth who tended to associate with the "bad boys," as his parents called boys from poor families. As a teenager, he developed an obsession with one day being president. As he wrote in private school: "I'm going to be a lawyer and Governor and Secretary of State and President." As a student, he was considered to be intelligent, charming and funny, but with a fierce combative streak along with being very egoistical. Bullitt did not hesitate to use his family's wealth to achieve his ambitions, and when one of his private school teachers accused him of cheating on an exam, Bullitt had his father use his influence to have the teacher fired.

Bullitt graduated from Yale University in 1912, after having been voted "most brilliant" in his class. When Bullitt arrived at Yale in September 1908, he saw the institution as mainly a way to make contacts for his future political career. Bullitt, who was already fluent in German and French, chose to major in those languages. This allowed him to achieve outstanding grades without working too hard. He himself noted that he spoke better German and French than his professors. Bullitt had little interest in learning, and he saw attending Yale more as a way to be popular, and he set out with much success to be the proverbial "big man on the campus." Handsome, intelligent, witty and good at both athletics and scholarship, Bullitt was an exceedingly popular student. Two of Bullitt's closest friends at Yale were Cole Porter and Monty Woolley, with whom he staged several plays. During his time at Yale, he was a member of the elite Phi Beta Kappa fraternity and in 1911 was elected to the Scroll and Key secret society.

After graduating from Yale, Bullitt enrolled at Harvard Law School. At Harvard, his professors did not tolerate the antics in which Bullitt engaged at Yale, such as his constant jokes in the lecture halls and his practice of diverting a classroom conversation in order to dominate it and show off his intellectual abilities. One of Bullitt's professors at Harvard, Joseph Henry Beale, took a particular pleasure in humiliating him in the classroom, which contributed to his decision to drop out of Harvard. Moreover, during his time at Harvard, Bullitt became obsessed with the fear that he might become impotent due to his prematurely thinning hair, because he erroneously associated baldness with a loss of sexual potency, and he assaulted several other students who suggested to him he would soon be impotent. Additionally, Bullitt did not enjoy his legal studies, which he had undertaken only because of his father, who threatened to cut him off from his monthly allowance if he did not enter Harvard Law School. When Bullitt's father died in March 1914, he immediately dropped out of Harvard.

== World War One ==
In 1914, Bullitt visited Russia with his mother. He was in Moscow on 28 July 1914 when Austria-Hungary declared war on Serbia, provoking pro-Serb demonstrations on the streets as angry crowds waved the Serbian and Russian flags while chanting "Down with Austria! Long live Serbia!" Bullitt took the last train from Moscow to Berlin and left Russia just before Germany declared war on Russia on 1 August 1914. Upon his return to America, Bullitt worked as a journalist for the Philadelphia Ledger, and become the deputy editor of the paper in 1915. In December 1915, in a publicity stunt, Henry Ford chartered an ocean liner, the Oscar II, which he called the "Peace Ship" and sailed to Europe with the intention of mediating an end to the war. Bullitt was one of the journalists abroad the Oscar II and he filed mocking reports from the ship about the resulting media circus, stressing the absurdity of Ford's voyage. These reports were published in various American newspapers. In January 1916, Bullitt started a popular humorous column in the Ledger, "Bumping the Bumps", which mocked virtually every aspect of American life.

He married socialite Aimee Ernesta Drinker (1892–1981) in 1916. Drinker was a renowned beauty from one of Philadelphia's wealthiest families who turned down marriage proposals from 50 different men before she decided to accept Bullitt's marriage proposal. Given her surplus of marriage proposals, many were surprised that she agreed to marry Bullitt, whom she dated only for a brief time and barely knew. The Drinker family had arrived in the newly founded colony of Pennsylvania in 1670 as one of the first English settlers, and had a quasi-aristocratic position in Philadelphia's social life. The marriage of a son and daughter from two of Philadelphia's richest families made front-page news in Philadelphia. Bullitt was incapable of understanding women as persons, and he regarded his wife as an object that existed only for his own needs. Given his views, the marriage became deeply unhappy.

The couple took their honeymoon in May 1916 in Germany, Austria-Hungary and German-occupied Belgium. Bullitt interviewed various German and Austrian leaders for the Ledger. The Bullitts were described by the Russian historian Alexander Etkind as a "socially progressive, but culturally conservative" couple who greatly admired the welfare state of Imperial Germany, which preserved the rule of the traditional elites while providing sufficient care for the poor to apparently end the possibility of a revolution. Bullitt was especially impressed with the German health care system, under which the German state provided free medical care for all, and came to wish that his country adopt a similar system. In September 1916, Bullitt took a guided tour of the Eastern Front, where he wrote admiringly of the German Army. Bullitt interviewed the industrialist Walther Rathenau who told him that Germany might give Constantinople to Russia as compensation for German annexations of other parts of the Russian empire. When Bullitt objected that the Ottomans would be opposed to the loss of their capital, Rathenau cynically replied, "We would only have to publish full accounts of the Armenian massacres, and German public opinion would be so incensed that we could drop the Turks as allies."

Bullitt came to dislike the censorship and the overbearing behavior of the German officials. Ernesta wrote in her diary: "Billy says the Germans are the most moral people in the world when it comes to dealing with Germans and the most immoral in their dealings with the rest of the world." On 3 September 1916, in Budapest, Bullitt interviewed the Hungarian prime minister, Count István Tisza, who admitted to him that the Austrian ultimatum to Serbia in 1914 had been written with the intention of having it be rejected. When he asked Tisza if the German government had been aware of the ultimatum, Tisza refused to answer. Tisza gave Bullitt the impression that he regarded starting the war as a monstrous mistake as he told him that all Austria wanted in 1914 was to annex Serbia, which had led to a war where millions had died. On 17 September 1916 in Berlin, Bullitt interviewed the German Foreign Secretary, Gottlieb von Jagow, and caught him in a lie when Jagow claimed to have been ignorant of the contents of the Austrian ultimatum to Serbia. Bullitt then tricked Jagow into admitting that he had seen the Austrian ultimatum before it was issued. The interview made front-page news around the world.

== Service in the Wilson administration ==
In February 1917, Bullitt interviewed "Colonel" Edward M. House, a man who had no official position in the administration of President Woodrow Wilson, but was the president's closest friend and adviser who lived in the White House. Both House and Bullitt belonged to the progressive wing of the Democratic party, and found that they had much in common. House served as Bullitt's mentor in politics and introduced him to both Wilson and later to Franklin D. Roosevelt. Ernesta gave birth to a son in 1917, who died two days later. Bullitt greatly admired Wilson, whom he called "clean-hearted", "pure' and "wise".

On 6 April 1917, the United States declared war on Germany following the resumption of unrestricted submarine warfare and the publication of the Zimmermann telegram. Owing to his fluent German, Bullitt served at first in Army intelligence. Walter Lippmann, a friend of Wilson's, recommended Bullitt for intelligence work, calling him the "sharpest of the American correspondents". In December 1917, he was appointed assistant secretary of state for Europe and reported to Joseph Grew. However, Bullitt tended to by-pass Grew and spent his reports straight to the president, who greatly admired Bullitt's writing. It was during this period that Bullitt first became preoccupied with Russia as he sought to devise an American policy for the new Bolshevik regime. In 1918, Bullitt was opposed to the "Polar Bear Expedition" as U.S. Army units were dispatched to the Arctic cities of Archangel and Murmansk, ostensibly to prevent American war supplies from falling into German hands, as he advised Wilson that American intervention on the White side in the Russian civil war would be a cardinal mistake.

== Diplomatic career ==
Working for President Woodrow Wilson at the 1919 Paris Peace Conference, Bullitt was a strong supporter of liberal democratic internationalism, which was later known as Wilsonianism. When Wilson sailed to France to attend the Paris peace conference in December 1918 aboard the ocean liner USS George Washington, Bullitt also sailed aboard the George Washington as a member of the American delegation. The other members of the American delegation were surprised by the aloof manner of the president, who spent almost all of his time with his wife Edith and told the American delegation very little about what he expected of them once they arrived in Paris. Bullitt approached Wilson to tell him that the other members of the American delegation wanted the president to spend more time with them discussing what should be the American goals at the peace conference, instead of spending his time with Edith Wilson. Wilson agreed and for the first time told the American delegation about what he expected them to achieve in Paris. Wilson was impressed with Bullitt's boldness as the other members of the delegation had all felt his concerns, but none had the courage to speak to him.

== Bullitt Mission of 1919 ==
Like the other members of the American delegation, Bullitt was annoyed by the way that Wilson sought to concentrate all of the decision-making in his hands. On 17 February 1919, Colonel House told Bullitt that he was to go to Moscow to meet Vladimir Lenin. Along with Philip Kerr, the private secretary to the British prime minister, David Lloyd George, House briefed Bullitt on his secret mission. House stated that Bullitt's mission was "for information only". Bullitt always insisted that he been sent to Moscow to negotiate the terms on which the United States would establish diplomatic relations with Soviet Russia, a claim that is not supported by the documentary evidence. Both Wilson and Lloyd George had hopes of reaching an understanding with the new Bolshevik regime, but at the same time were aware that the French Premier Georges Clemenceau favored a hardline anti-Bolshevik stance.

A major issue in relations was the Bolshevik debt repudiation of all the debts of Imperial Russia on 21 January 1918. In the largest debt repudiation ever in history adjusted for inflation, some 13 billion rubles worth of debt, a sum equal to $6.5 billion U.S. dollars, was repudiated in its entirety by Lenin as a matter of principle, which inflicted a major blow to the stability of the international finance system, which had already been strained by the First World War. Of the bondholders affected by the Bolshevik debt repudiation, half were French. French investors had been by far the largest buyers of Russian bonds, and had invested the most capital in Russia, and French public opinion was outraged by the nationalization without compensation of all French assets in Russia, which amounted to a sum equal to $2.5 billion U.S. dollars, along with the Soviet debt repudiation of 1918. Admiral Alexander Kolchak, the "supreme leader" of the Whites, had promised to repay the repudiated bonds once the Whites won the civil war, and so he was the Russian leader most favored by the French. Both the British and the American delegations knew that recognizing Soviet Russia would cause problems with the French delegation at a time when there was much tension about the other aspects of the peace terms, and the Bullitt mission was intended to open the door for future recognition of Soviet Russia at a later point. The Bullitt mission was so secret that only four people were even aware of it, and amongst those excluded were the State Department, the Foreign Office and the French government. Bullitt was acting on behalf of the U.S. government, but his mission also had the tacit support of the British government. Lloyd George was sympathetic towards the Bolshevik regime, but his Conservative coalition partners were not. The Canadian historian Margaret MacMillan wrote that Bullitt was chosen for the mission because he was "expendable" if it failed. MacMillan described the 28-year old Bullitt as a very ambitious and somewhat immature man who let his associations with world leaders and his hopes for advancement get the better of him, as he wanted too badly a major success that would elevate him into the world elite. Likewise, the American historian Richard Pipes wrote that Bullitt was a very ambitious man who was unqualified for the mission to Moscow. Bullitt was so determined to have all the expected glory from his mission to Moscow that he excluded more experienced diplomats such as Joseph Grew from going with him.

Prior to the negotiation of the Treaty of Versailles, Bullitt, along with journalist Lincoln Steffens and Swedish communist Karl Kilbom, undertook a special mission to Soviet Russia to negotiate diplomatic relations between the United States and the Bolshevik regime. It was authorized by Wilson advisor Edward M. House. The Bullitt mission was opposed by the Secretary of State, Robert Lansing, the British War Secretary Winston Churchill, and the French Premier Georges Clemenceau, all of whom favored support for the White cause in the Russian civil war. In Petrograd (modern St. Petersburg), Bullitt and Steffens met Grigory Zinoviev who lost interest in them once it was clear that their visit was for "information only". In Moscow, Bullitt and Steffens were treated as honored guests, being allowed to live in a palace that had once belonged to a grand duke of the House of Romanov; were given the best caviar for their meals; and at the Moscow opera sat in a booth that had once been reserved only for the Emperor Nicholas II and the other members of the imperial family. Bullitt noticed that the streets of Moscow were covered with corpses of those who had starved to death, which Bullitt blamed not on Bolshevik policies, but on the Allied blockade. Bullitt and Steffens met Lenin at the Kremlin and came away impressed. Bullitt reported to Wilson that Lenin was "straightforward and direct, but also genial and with a large humor and serenity". Likewise, Bullitt was impressed with the Foreign Commissar, Georgy Chicherin, and his English-speaking deputy foreign commissar, Maxim Litvinov, as he reported to Wilson that both Chicherin and Litvinov were "full of the sense of Russia's need for peace" and were willing to repay all of the repudiated debts provided the Allies cease supporting the Whites.

On March 14, Bullitt received a Soviet proposal that demanded that the Allies agree to a peace summit on the Russian Civil War in which they had been participating. The proposed terms for discussion included the lifting of the Allied blockade on the country, the withdrawal of foreign troops from Russia, the disarmament of the warring Russian factions, and a commitment by the Bolshevik government to honor Russia's financial obligations to the Allies (the second time that the Soviets promised in writing to honor the Tsarist debt). Under the terms proposed, the Allies would withdraw all of their forces from Russia and end all support for the Whites. Lenin was willing to accept the existence of the various White governments, but since his offer called for an end for Allied support for the Whites, his concession was only cosmetic. The Bolsheviks had control of Petrograd, Moscow and the industrial cities of the Urals and hence of the Russian arms industry, while the Whites depended entirely upon arms from abroad. Bullitt was highly enthusiastic about Lenin's offer, and very much favored accepting it. Bullitt saw Lenin's offer as a way to enter elite circles and wrote to Colonel House "You must do your utmost for it". Bullitt and Steffens returned from Moscow alongside the British writer and spy Arthur Ransome, who worked as a double agent for both MI6 and the Cheka. Ransome—who publicly supported the Bolsheviks—served as Bullitt's guide to Russia. Pipes wrote that: "Bullitt's mission had an air of unreality about it. Only people ignorant of the causes of the conflict and the passions that it aroused could conceive of such a plan".

The Allied leaders rejected these terms, however, apparently convinced that the White forces would be victorious. British Prime Minister David Lloyd George had given early support to the Bullitt Commission, but he refused to make its findings known to the public. He told Bullitt that was because of pressure by Winston Churchill, who was an ardent anticommunist. House was in favor of accepting Lenin's offer, but Wilson was not. Bullitt in his report to Wilson wrote that "a dull, inexperienced, young people were trying rudely but conscientiously and at the cost of great suffering to themselves to find a better way than the old way".

On 28 March 1919, Bullitt shared a breakfast with Lloyd George, who told him that personally that he was in favor of accepting Lenin's offer, but the establishment of the Hungarian Soviet Republic led by Béla Kun had alarmed the Conservative Party's backbenchers. Lloyd George was a Liberal, but as he headed a coalition government with the Conservatives, he could not afford to alienate Conservative opinion in Britain. Joining Lloyd George for the breakfast with Bullitt were his private secretary Philip Kerr, the cabinet secretary General Maurice Hankey and the South African prime minister Jan Smuts. The Bullitt mission had been leaked to the media after his return, and newspapers reported rumors that the United States and the United Kingdom were about to establish diplomatic relations with Soviet Russia. In a leader (editorial) in the Daily Mail written by Henry Wickham Steed, Lloyd George was accused of working for "Jewish interests" to aid the Bolsheviks. Lloyd George handed over to Bullitt the Daily Mail with the leader attacking him and told him: "As long as the British press is doing this kind of thing, how can you expect me to be sensible about Russia?" On 16 April 1919, Lloyd George stated in the House of Commons about the Bullitt mission: "There was a suggestion that there was some young American who had come back". Clemenceau was utterly opposed to the Bullitt mission when he learned of it, and favored continued French support for the Whites.

Having failed to convince the leadership to support the establishment of relations with the Bolshevik government, Bullitt resigned from Wilson's staff. Bullitt was shattered by the way he had been disowned, and turned against Wilson, who he felt had betrayed him. On 7 May 1919, Bullitt called a meeting of the younger members of the American delegation at the Hôtel de Crillon and asked all to jointly resign to protest the terms of the Treaty of Versailles, which he argued were too harsh on Germany, in order to embarrass Wilson. He argued to the assembled diplomats "This isn't a treaty of peace" and argued that as a group they had a moral responsibility to resign. Bullitt handed out red roses to those delegation members who agreed to resign and yellow roses to those who refused. Of the young American diplomats, only nine received the red roses from Bullitt. Among those who joined Bullitt in resigning were Adolf A. Berle and Samuel Eliot Morison.

On May 17, 1919, Bullitt publicly resigned from the American peace commission in Paris after he read the terms of the Treaty of Versailles. Bullitt stated in his resignation letter that he planned "to lie on the sand and let the world go to hell". In an open letter to Wilson, he condemned the peace as a tragic mockery of the principle of self-determination. He wrote: "I was one of the millions who trusted confidently and implicitly in your leadership and believed that you would take nothing less than a 'permanent peace' based upon 'unselfish and unbiased justice'. But our government has consented now to deliver the suffering peoples of the world to new oppressions, subjections and dismemberments—a new century of war...Russia has not been considered at all. Unjust decisions of the conference in regard to Shantung, the Tyrol, Thrace, Hungary, East Prussia, Danzig, the Saar Valley and the abandonment of the principle of the freedom of the seas make new international conflicts certain. It is my conviction that the present League of Nations will be powerless to prevent these wars and the United States will be involved in them". He later returned to the United States and testified in the Senate against the Treaty of Versailles. The Republican Senator Henry Cabot Lodge had Bullitt called as an expert witness before the Senate Foreign Relations Committee, where he testified that if the American people knew what had really happened during the Paris peace conference, they would never accept the Treaty of Versailles, which Bullitt called a betrayal of Wilson's principles. Bullitt's testimony before the Senate received much coverage in the American media and helped to turn American public opinion against the Treaty of Versailles. During his testimony, Bullitt depicted Wilson as a weak man who had given away too much at the Paris peace conference to create what he called an unacceptable treaty.

He also had his report of his Russian trip placed into the record. Margaret MacMillan describes both Bullitt and Steffens as "useful idiots" who were swindled by Lenin into Western abandonment of the White Russian factions. Most historians, however, consider Lenin's peace offer to be a genuine effort to end the war that threatened his regime. Stephen M. Walt called it a "lost opportunity" for the Allies to obtain better terms from the Soviets than they ultimately did.

== It's Not Done in Istanbul, marriage to Louise Bryant and with the "Lost Generation" in Paris ==
After leaving his job at the Department of State, Bullitt became managing editor of film stories at Paramount. Bullitt's dramatic appearance before the Senate Foreign Relations Committee in 1919 where he denounced Wilson and the Treaty of Versailles led him to become a pariah within the Democratic Party. In 1921, Bullitt's wife, Ernesta, left him, though their divorce was not completed until 1923. Several scenes in his novel It's Not Done such as when Mildred Ashley (the stand-in for Ernesta) tells her husband John Corsey (a stand-in for Bullitt) that "It's silly anyhow for us to sleep in the same bed. Only peasants sleep in the same bed" were based on incidents that occurred during his marriage. Bullitt became a foreign correspondent in Europe and later a novelist. In 1921, he met Louise Bryant and accompanied her the next year in her journalistic travels in Europe. In early 1923, they moved to Istanbul where they were settled in a historical villa overlooking Bosporus on the Asian side of the city that remained from the influential 18th century Köprülü family. ‌Being still legally married to Aimee Drinker, he introduced Louise Bryant as his niece. Later in 1923, Bullitt divorced Drinker. Bullitt's friend, George F. Kennan, wrote about him in 1972: "I see Bill Bullitt, in retrospect, as a member of that remarkable group of young Americans...for whom the First World War was the great electrifying experience of life. They were a striking generation, full of talent and exuberance, determined—if one may put it so—to make life come alive. The mark they made on American culture will be there when many other marks have faded." Bryant was the famous journalist author of Six Red Months in Russia and widow of radical journalist John Reed.

In Istanbul, Bryant covered the Turkish War of Independence for the International News Service, while Bullitt worked on his novel, It's Not Done (published in 1926), and dedicated it to Bryant. Bullitt adopted a boy who had lost his father in the Balkan Wars and took him to the US. In February 1924, Bryant gave birth to a daughter, Anne, whose father was Bullitt. Shortly afterwards, Bullitt and Bryant were secretly married in Istanbul with the marriage only being revealed to the world in July 1924 when the couple settled in Paris. Both Bullitt and Bryant were leading members of the self-exiled "Lost Generation" American expatriates in Paris in the 1920s and socialized with other intellectuals of the "lost generation" such as Ernest Hemingway and F. Scott Fitzgerald, though Hemingway considered Bullitt to be rather pompous and conceited.

Many of Bryant's friends were shocked by her change in behavior after she married Bullitt as her biographer, Mary Dearborn, noted that "she had turned her attention from causes to clothes, from politics to parties". Many of Bryant's friends regarded the marriage as a bizarre one as the former militant Communist Bryant embraced the role of a rich man's wife in Paris whose only major concerns were shopping and parties. Much astonishment was expressed at the way that Bullitt had turned Bryant into a "superficial" woman who was seemingly only interested in wearing the latest fashions of Paris. What was considered even more strange was Bullitt's extreme idolization of Bryant's second husband, the Communist journalist, John Reed, a man whom Bullitt greatly liked and admired from the time he first met him in 1915. Bullitt was intelligent and wealthy, but he felt much inferior to the macho war correspondent Reed who had covered revolutions in Mexico and Russia. Bullitt was a man much given to doubts about his masculinity and he had a morbid fear of one day suffering from impotence. Bullitt regarded Reed as the man he wanted to be, and he saw marrying his widow as a way of proving his equality or even his superiority over Reed. This was especially the case as Reed had succeeded in establishing a relationship with the Bolsheviks, being Lenin's favorite American friend, while Bullitt had failed. Bullitt had intended American recognition of Soviet Russia to serve as the basis to launch his political career, and the failure of his mission to Moscow in 1919 deeply rankled with him. The fact that Reed had a low opinion of the Bullitt mission, which he mocked at the time, further contributed to Bullitt's jealousness. Bryant often talked in glowing terms about Reed, a tendency that Bullitt encouraged as he loved to hear his wife praise her second husband. Bullitt seems to have married Bryant largely because she was Reed's widow as he triumphantly wrote in 1923 when he learned that Bryant was pregnant with his child that "the woman who was so important to John Reed and the mother-to-be of the Bullitt heir were one and the same".

In 1926, he published It's Not Done, a satirical novel that lampooned the dying aristocracy of Chesterbridge (Philadelphia) and its life revolving around Rittenhouse Square. The New York Times described the work as "a novel of ideas, whose limitation is that it is a volley, a propaganda novel, directed against a single institution, the American aristocratic ideal, and whose defect is that the smoke does not quite clear away so that one can accurately count the corpses." It's Not Done was a bestseller when it was published in 1926 owing to its risqué content. The title of the book was an allusion to the 1863 novel What is to be done? by Nikolay Chernyshevsky. The book reflected Bullitt's cynical attitude towards American democracy, which he depicted as a corrupt sham in It's Not Done. In his novel, he portrayed the United States as being ruled by a secret oligarchy of wealthy families who manipulated the politicians to serve their interests. In It's Not Done, Bullitt mocked American life as asinine and philistine as at one point a character commented that the United States was full of "matchless clowns such as Bryan, Billy Sunday, Gompers" along with "the Rotarians, Ku Kluxers and the readers of The Book of Etiqutte". Reflecting Bullitt's still simmering rage with Wilson, the former president appeared in It's Not Done as a sanctimonious buffoon speaking with a ridiculously overdrawn Southern accent.

The plot of It's Not Done concerned a young man, John Corsey, from an ultra-wealthy family in Chesterbridge (a city in Pennsylvania that was a barely disguised Philadelphia) who attends Harvard Law School, but drops out and then works as a journalist. Besides for having precisely the same background and backstory as Bullitt, Corsey was similar to Bullitt in terms of personality. Corsey has a passionate romance with the Frenchwoman Nina Michaud, an intellectual and a sculptor, who closely resembles Bryant in terms of appearance and personality. Nina is portrayed as a sensuous type who prefers to sculpt nudes because it allows her to admire the naked bodies of the models she hires. However, at the prompting of his overbearing mother, John abandons Nina to marry Mildred Ashely, a beautiful and "proper" woman from the American upper classes who strongly resembles Bullitt's first wife, Ernesta Drinker. John tells his mother that Nina makes him "happy, happy, happy", but admits that "she's not our kind". Heartbroken, Nina returns to France, and unknown to John, is pregnant with his child. Mildred is both emotionally cold and frigid, gives birth to a son and being married to her after a year causes John to become impotent due to psychological as opposed to physiological reasons. Just like the real Ernesta Drinker, Mildred has an affair with the German ambassador to the United States, Count Johann Heinrich von Bernstorff, and continued to write him even after the United States declared war on Germany in 1917. After years of being unhappy, John meets Nina, and learns he was the father of her illegitimate son, Raoul, a Reed-like crusading French Communist journalist. The discovery miraculously cures John of his impotence and he joyously has sex with Nina. John divorces Mildred, marries Nina and the book ends with John and Nina bailing out their son who has been jailed for inciting a strike. John does not share Raoul's Communist politics, but he rejoins in the irony that his bloodline will be carried on by a man committed to the destruction of the capitalist system that has made him into a rich man. The book was very successful, going through 24 printings within a year of publication.

== Friendship with Freud ==
Bullitt was psychoanalyzed by Sigmund Freud in Vienna in 1926. At the time, Bullitt's marriage to Bryant was collapsing due to his frequent affairs and he was feeling suicidal, leading him to go to Vienna to seek Freud's help. The patient and the analyst became such good friends that they decided to write a book together, a psycho-biographical study of Woodrow Wilson. That was quite exceptional, as Freud very rarely co-operated with other authors. Freud had confessed to Bullitt that he was feeling depressed while Bullitt mentioned to him that he was writing a book about the Paris peace conference of 1919 with every chapter to be devoted to covering one of the principle leaders, all of whom Bullitt had met. Freud offered to help write the chapter on Wilson, which developed into a biography of Wilson. Bullitt realized the book would sell better if it was marketed as a psychobiography of Wilson co-written by Freud. Freud wanted to work with Bullitt, who had known Wilson well and provided him with first-hand insights into the former president. Freud greatly hated Wilson for his 14 Points, which he blamed for causing the end of his beloved Austrian empire. Bullitt was likewise equally hostile to Wilson, a mentor and friend he had turned against. Out of a shared dislike of Wilson, the two went to work writing their psychobiography.

Greatly influenced by Freud's theories, Bullitt wrote a novel, The Divine Wisdom, that was considered highly scandalous at the time due to its frank description of sexuality and an incestuous affair between the two main characters. The Divine Wisdom begins in St. Petersburg in the late 19th century when a wealthy American industrialist, Peter Rives, falls in love with and marries Ursula Dundas, the beautiful daughter of the American ambassador to Russia. The character of Ursula Dundas was a thinly disguised version of Ernesta Drinker, Bullitt's first wife. Rives and Dundas live happily together with Anna, Peter's daughter from his first marriage, but the marriage collapses when Rives discovers his wife has been unfaithful with a British diplomat, whose child she is pregnant with. Peter divorces Ursula, and returns to America with Anna while Ursula raises her son alone. Under the shock of his wife's infidelity, Peter becomes a fanatical Christian whose life mission is to stamp out all immorality in America. David, Ursula's son by her lover, serves in the First World War while Anna serves as a nurse. In Istanbul after the war, David and Anna meet and fall in love, being unaware that David's mother was once married to Anna's father. Even after learning the secret, David and Anna continue their relationship. The couple are legally brother and sister as David's birth certificate lists Peter as his father, but the two cannot bear to be separated, and instead consummate their love. When Rives learns of the relationship, he is enraged and arrives in Istanbul with the intention of killing both of them for what he views as an incestuous affair, even though he is aware that he is not David's father. David and Anna are chased by a gang of ruffians hired by Peter down the streets. The couple flee to the tunnels of Istanbul, discover a room full of treasure, have sex under the statue of Dionysus and uncover the secrets of the Emperor Julian the Apostate. At the novel's climax, David saves Anna from being killed by Peter, but is wounded and dies in Anna's arms. The Divine Wisdom reflected Bullitt's disenchantment with the puritanical atmosphere in 1920s America, symbolized most notably by Prohibition, and his greater comfort in the more relaxed and permissive atmosphere in Europe. The major theme of the novel is the deeply felt love between David and Anna vs. the stern and deranged puritanism of Peter, whom is determined that both should die for what he considers to be incest, which was Bullitt's attack on what he considered to be repressive morality of America.

== Divorce and friendship with Roosevelt ==
In May 1928 Bullitt had discovered in Bryant's room several love letters to her from the painter and sculptor Gwen Le Gallienne, who had agreed to teach Bryant how to paint and sculpt, which marked the effective end of his marriage. Despite his wife's very public affair with Le Gallienne, which she no longer bothered to conceal after Bullitt found Le Gallienne's love letters, he remained fond of her and initially refused to divorce her. As he researched his Wilson biography, Bullitt came into contact with several Democratic leaders, most notably "Colonel" House, which led him to resume his ambitions for a political career, and he returned to the United States in 1929. Bryant did not follow her husband and remained in Paris with Le Gallienne. In December 1929, Bullitt filed for divorce under the grounds that Bryant was having an affair with Le Gallienne. The real reason for the divorce suit was that Bullitt had realized that his marriage to a well known Communist writer was threatening his political ambitions, and he used his wife's lesbian affair as his cudgel to win sole custody of their daughter. Bryant was so embarrassed by the love letters from Le Gallienne that Bullitt's lawyer, Thomas White, introduced as evidence that she was an unfit mother that she did not contest the divorce. On 24 March 1930, a Philadelphia court dissolved his marriage to Bryant and awarded him sole custody of their daughter, Anne. In 1967, Anne Bullitt married her fourth husband, U.S. Senator Daniel Brewster; her four marriages were childless.

In May–June 1932, Bullitt made a lengthy visit to the Soviet Union, where he met the Soviet Foreign Commissar, Maxim Litvinov. Upon his return to America, Bullitt served as a foreign policy adviser for Governor Roosevelt who became the Democratic candidate for presidency that year. Colonel House-who was still the éminence grise of the Democrats- had decided that Bullitt was one of the few Democrats with sufficient knowledge of foreign affairs to advise Roosevelt, whose background as governor of New York was felt by House to make him ill-informed about foreign policy. House was an elder statesmen within the Democratic party and he advised Roosevelt to accept Bullitt's services. Bullitt donated a large sum of money to the Roosevelt campaign and on 23 September 1932 received a handwritten thank-you letter from Roosevelt. Bullitt first met Roosevelt on 5 October 1932, and quickly become one of his close friends. In November 1932, Roosevelt was elected president and in January 1933, he sent Bullitt on a tour of Europe to contact various European leaders on behalf of the president-elect. Roosevelt was in Warm Springs at the time, and Bullitt used a code to communicate with him.

Bullitt was primarily concerned about the problem of European debts to the United States as he met with prime minister Ramsay MacDonald and the chancellor of the exchequer Neville Chamberlain in London; Édouard Herriot and the premier Joseph Paul-Boncour in Paris; and the German Foreign Minister Baron Konstantin von Neurath in Berlin. While he was in Berlin, Bullitt met up with his old friend Ernst "Putzi" Hanfstaengl to get his opinion on Adolf Hitler, who just been appointed German chancellor on 30 January 1933, with Hanfstaengl responding, "He is a small, obscure Austrian house painter with the ability to speak to crowds." During his mission, Bullitt wore disguises; rented apartments under his own name, which he failed to live in to confuse any reporters; and rented the apartments he did live in under false names. When Bullitt arrived in New York on 16 February 1933, he told a reporter from the New York Times that it was "sheer nonsense" that he had been representing Roosevelt. Bullitt was nearly prosecuted for violating the Logan Act for his European trip, and only the difficulty in assembling evidence that he had been abroad representing the president-elect prevented charges from being laid.

== First U.S. ambassador to the Soviet Union ==
=== The debt issue ===
President Franklin Roosevelt appointed Bullitt the first U.S. ambassador to the Soviet Union, a post that he held from 1933 to 1936. At the time of his appointment, Bullitt was known as a liberal and thought by some to be something of a radical with a British Foreign Office memo calling him a "pinko". The Soviets welcomed him as an old friend because of his diplomatic efforts at the Paris Peace Conference. Bullitt arrived in the Soviet Union with high hopes for Soviet–American relations with the aim of forging a possible alliance against Japan, whose imperialistic policies in Asia as demonstrated by the conquest of Manchuria in 1931 was a matter of grave concern in both Moscow and Washington. The Soviets had broken the Japanese Army's codes, and were well aware that the generals of the Kwantung Army were seriously considering invading Siberia. The Japanese government was divided into two factions-the "strike north" school associated with the Imperial Japanese Army that favored the conquest of Siberia vs. the "strike south" school associated with the Imperial Japanese Navy that favored the conquest of Southeast Asia including the American colony of the Philippines. Roosevelt had been alarmed by Japanese ambitions in Asia and by the way that the Japanese state was spending increasing large sums on the expansion of the Imperial Navy, which suggested that the Japanese were envisioning a war with the United States at some point in the future. Right from the beginning of his administration, Roosevelt had championed more spending on the U.S. Navy, which he presented to Congress as a public works measure to create jobs, but were in fact aimed against Japan. However, Congress did not share the president's fear of Japan, and voted for less money for the Navy than what Roosevelt wanted. Bullitt had argued to Roosevelt that an American-Soviet alignment would "restrict" the Japanese from further aggression. Unable to have Congress vote for the larger Navy that he wanted, Roosevelt favored an alignment with the Soviet Union as a way to discourage Japanese imperialism in China. Bullitt was in contact with Soviet diplomats all through 1933 and he was able to arrange a visit to Washington by the Foreign Commissar, Maxim Litvinov, who had a dinner with Roosevelt at the White House on 19 November 1933. Shortly afterwards, Roosevelt issued a press statement that the United States would be establishing diplomatic relations with the Soviet Union.

On 29 November 1933, Bullitt sailed for Europe and on 8 December 1933 was joined in Paris by George F. Kennan who was to serve as his translator as Bullitt spoke very little Russian. Kennan wrote in his diary: "Bullitt is a striking man, confident in himself, confident of the president's support, confident that he will have no difficulty in cracking the nut of Communist suspicion and hostility...He is not a radical, but he is not afraid of radicals". Upon his arrival in Moscow via train on 11 December, he was greeted by Litvinov at the station. At the Alexandrovsky Palace on 19 December, when Bullitt presented his credentials as the ambassador of the United States to President Mikhail Kalinin, he gave an exaggerated account of the possibilities of co-operation that took no account of American isolationism by promising a relationship that be not only normal, but also very friendly. On 20 December 1933, Bullitt first met Joseph Stalin, the first secretary of the Communist Party, at a dinner party at the Kremlin that was also attended by the premier Vyacheslav Molotov; the Defense Commissar, Marshal Kliment Voroshilov; Litvinov; Stalin's chief of staff, Alexander Yegorov; and the commissar for heavy industry, Grigori Piatokov. Stalin was a rather mysterious figure whom foreigners were rarely allowed to see and Bullitt noted that it was an "extraordinary gesture" that he was allowed to see Stalin in the Kremlin. Bullitt reported to Roosevelt that Stalin was "rather short", but that he had powerful brown eyes that were "intensely shrewd and continuously smiling". When Bullitt asked about reports of a famine that had killed millions in the Soviet countryside, he received a blanket denial from Stalin.

The major issue during Bullitt's time in Moscow was securing readdress for the American investors who had purchased Russian bonds that the new Soviet government had repudiated in 1918. The total value of the repudiated bonds owing to American bondholders was $600 million U.S. dollars. Bullitt's speech to Kalinin had created false hopes in the Kremlin about the possibilities of American-Soviet alliance against Japan while Bullitt argued that better relations would only be possible if the Soviet regime agreed to make a lump sum payment of $175 million of the repudiated bonds with the rest to be written off. Litvinov suggested an American-Soviet alliance against Japan shortly after Bullitt arrived in Moscow, which forced Bullitt to tell him that Congress would not accept such an alliance. The Soviets mistook Bullit's statement about the Senate being unwilling to ratify an alliance with the Soviet Union as a bargaining tactic instead being the statement of fact that it was. Bullitt believed that the Soviet fear of Japanese expansionism placed the United States in a very strong position to demand a settlement of the repudiated bonds on American terms. When an agreement to repay the repudiated bonds failed to occur, Bullitt blamed Litvinov. In his reports to Washington, Bullitt blamed Litvinov as the intransigent one, whom he believed was causing the debt talks to falter, and most notably he never blamed Stalin. Bullitt tried to by-pass Litvinov by befriending Karl Radek, the editor of Pravda, and by playing polo with Marshal Voroshilov. Litvinov was actually keen to secure a settlement of the debt question, which he realized was the major stumbling block to better Soviet-American relations, but as Litvinov later noted that Stalin could not resist the temptation of "doing in" the Americans over the question of how the Soviets would repay the repudiated bonds. Both sides felt that the fear of Japan had placed them in a strong bargaining position over the other and hence the failure of the talks to resolve the debt questions.

As an ambassador, Bullitt was considered to be a stern perfectionist who demanded much from his staff and would explode in rage at any failure. On 11 June 1934, Bullitt took on Carmel Offie as his private secretary. Offie was more than a private secretary and instead served as a sort of man Friday for Bullitt who gladly took on any task for the ambassador at all hours. A British diplomat wrote that Offie was "this wretched young man who puts with being at his beck and call all day and night". In November 1934, Bullitt made a return visit to the United States via China. While in Nanking, he met Chiang Kai-shek. As Chiang spoke no English, his American-educated wife Soong Mei-ling translated for him. Chiang complained to him at length via Soong about Soviet support for the Chinese Communist guerrillas. Chiang argued to Bullitt that it was not possible for China to take a stand against Japan as long as his nation was wrecked by civil war, and he asked Bullitt to use his good offers to persuade the Soviets to cease their support for the Chinese Communist People's Liberation Army. When Bullitt reached Washington, he submitted a detailed report on the economic situation to the Treasury Secretary Henry Morgenthau Jr. where he warned presciently that the rampant inflation in China was undermining the Kuomintang regime, and predicted if the inflation continued it would be the ultimate end of Chiang's regime.

=== The Spring Ball of the Full Moon ===
On April 24, 1935, he hosted a Spring Festival at Spaso House, his official residence. He instructed his staff to create an event that would surpass every other embassy party in Moscow's history. The decorations included a forest of ten young birch trees in the chandelier room; a dining room table covered with Finnish tulips; a lawn made of chicory grown on wet felt; an aviary made from fishnet filled with pheasants, parakeets, and one hundred zebra finches, on loan from the Moscow Zoo; and a menagerie of several mountain goats, a dozen white roosters, and a baby bear.

The four hundred guests included Foreign Commissar Maxim Litvinov and the Defense Commissar Marshal Kliment Voroshilov; Communist Party luminaries Nikolai Bukharin, Lazar Kaganovich, and Karl Radek; Soviet Marshals Alexander Yegorov, Mikhail Tukhachevsky, and Semyon Budyonny; and the writer Mikhail Bulgakov. The festival lasted until the early hours of the morning. The bear became drunk on champagne given to him by Radek, and in the early morning hours, the zebra finches escaped from the aviary and perched below the ceilings around the house. Bulgakov described the party as "The Spring Ball of the Full Moon" in his novel The Master and Margarita. On October 29, 2010, Ambassador John Beyrle recreated Bullitt's ball with his own Enchanted Ball, dedicated to Bullitt and Bulgakov.

=== Disenchantment ===
The turning point in Bullitt's views towards the Soviet Union was the 7th World Congress of the Comintern in Moscow. Bullitt was outraged that the members of the Communist Party of the United States (CPUSA) were planning to attend the congress, which he saw as Soviet interference in American internal affairs. As the congress approached in the spring and summer of 1935, he grew increasingly angry as Litvinov answered his demands that no members of the CPUSA be permitted to attend the congress by claiming to be ignorant about whatever members of the CPUSA would be present in Moscow or not. Litvinov's spurious claims that the Soviet government had no control over the Comintern and that he had no idea about who would be attending the conference exasperated Bullitt.

On 19 July 1935, Bullitt reported to the secretary of state, Cordell Hull, his belief that: "the aim of the Soviet government is, and will remain, to produce world revolution. The leaders of the Soviet Union believe that the first step toward this revolution must be to strengthen the defensive and offensive power of the Soviet Union. They believe within ten years the defense position of the Soviet Union will be absolutely impregnable and that within 15 years the offensive power of the Soviet Union will be sufficient to enable it to consolidate by its assistance any communist government which may be set up in Europe. To maintain peace for the present, to keep the nations of Europe divided, to foster enmity between Japan and the United States, and to gain the blind devotion and obedience of the communists of all countries so that they will act against their own governments at the behest of the Communist Party in the Kremlin, is the sum of Stalin's policy". Bullitt argued that the chief aim of American diplomacy must be to "...to point out the danger to Europe of the continuation of the Franco-German enmity and to encourage reconciliation between France and Germany". Bullitt concluded: "we should the guard the reputation of Americans for businesslike efficiency, sincerity and straightforwardness. We should never send a spy to the Soviet Union. There is no weapon at once so disarming and effective in relations with the communists as sheer honesty. They know very little about it".

The 7th Congress called for Communists around the world to ally themselves with socialists and liberals in popular fronts against fascism, which Bullitt viewed as further Soviet meddling in American domestic affairs. He would remain an outspoken anticommunist for the rest of his life. In November 1935, Bullitt visited Berlin where he told German officials that Japan would be completely justified in conquering Siberia. William E. Dodd, the American ambassador in Berlin, noted that Bullitt had done a complete volte-face in his views towards the Soviet Union. Bullitt was recalled after American journalist Donald Day disclosed that he had been involved in illegal exchange of and trading with Torgsin rubles.

During that period, he was briefly engaged to Roosevelt's personal secretary, Missy LeHand. However, she broke off the engagement after a trip to Moscow during which she reportedly discovered him to be having an affair with Olga Lepeshinskaya, a ballet dancer.

== Ambassador to France ==
=== Appeaser ===
Bullitt was posted to France in October 1936 as ambassador. Going along with Bullitt to Paris was Offie, who continued to serve as his right-hand man. Alongside Joseph Kennedy-who was appointed the American ambassador in London in 1937-Bullitt was intended to serve as Roosevelt's "eyes and ears" in Europe. Both Kennedy and Bullitt were active Democrats who had used their great wealth to donate generously to Democratic candidates and both were close friends of the president, who distrusted the professional diplomats of the State Department. The professional diplomats of the Foreign Service tended to come from the American upper classes, and Roosevelt believed that as a group the professional diplomats were opposed to the New Deal. Both Bullitt and Kennedy had taken part in various ways in the New Deal, making them loyal in Roosevelt's eyes in a way that the State Department was not. Roosevelt appointed both Bullitt and Kennedy to two of the American grand embassies to serve as his personal representatives in Europe in an attempt to by-pass the State Department. Bullitt was one of Roosevelt's favorite foreign policy advisers alongside Sumner Welles. The American historian David Kennedy wrote: "The brash Bullitt and the silky Welles cordially detested one another, but they agreed that the United States must take a more active role in the world and encouraged the same attitude in their chief".

Fluent in French and an ardent francophile, Bullitt became established in Paris society. A man of much charm, wit, sophistication, and erudition, Bullitt was the most popular ambassador in Paris with the French people during the late Troisième République era. The American embassy in Paris was and still is located on the Place de la Concorde, a choice of location that placed Bullitt at the center of social life in Paris. The three ambassadors whom French decision-makers spoke to the most were Bullitt; the British ambassador Sir Eric Phipps; and the German ambassador, Count Johannes von Welczeck. Bullitt was easily the best loved of the trio. He rented a château at Chantilly and owned at least 18,000 bottles of French wine. As a close friend of Roosevelt, with whom he had daily telephone conversations, Bullitt was widely regarded as Roosevelt's personal envoy to France and so was much courted by French politicians. In their telephone calls, Bullitt and Roosevelt used a code where they spoke about the baseball teams of Harvard and Yale and the ages of Roosevelt's relatives in case the phone calls were tapped into. The American historian William Kaufmann wrote that Bullitt "established extremely confidential relations with French political and military leaders of all stripes." Kaufmann noted: "Whereas polo equipment for the Red Army, baseball games and zoo parties for Bolshevik functionaries had failed to soothe the Soviet beast, elaborate fetes and a superb chef at the Place de la Concorde brought him the most intimate confidences of high French society". Bullitt very much enjoyed his posting in Paris, which he regarded as the most glamorous city in the world, and drew unfavorable comparisons between life in Moscow (a city that he hated) vs. life in Paris. Alexis St. Léger, the secretary-general of the Quai d'Orsay, told Bullitt upon his arrival that Roosevelt's decision to appoint a close friend as ambassador in Paris had greatly pleased the French.

Bullitt was especially close to Léon Blum and Édouard Daladier and had cordial but not friendly relations with Georges Bonnet, whom he mistrusted. Historians have criticized Bullitt for being too influenced by the last person to whom he spoke to and for including too much gossip in his dispatches to Washington. However, Bullitt's dispatches to Washington are one of the main sources of information about French politics in the late Troisième République as many French politicians spoke very frankly to Bullitt about their feelings, interests, fears and concerns, all of which he passed on Washington. Bullitt was so popular in France and such a close friend to so many French politicians that he was known as the "unofficial minister without portfolio" in the French cabinet. As a very good friend of Roosevelt, Bullitt in the words of Kaufmann served "something more than an American ambassador to France. He acted as both a roving emissary, reporting on his experiences in Britain, Germany and Poland, and the informal inspector-general of the Diplomatic Service". On 1 December 1936, Bullitt reported: "Blum lunched with me alone today, and I had the opportunity to repeat to him everything that I had said to Deblos with regard to the absolute determination of the United States to stay out of any wars on the continent of Europe, but out of any engagements or commitments that might possibly lead to our involvement in wars". Bullitt had long believed that the Treaty of Versailles was too harsh on Germany and the only way to save the peace was to revise the international order in favor of Germany.

When Bonnet was appointed the French ambassador to the United States, Bullitt told Roosevelt: ""I don't think you'll like him. He is extremely intelligent and competent on economic and financial matters, but he's not a man of character. You may remember that he led the French delegation to the London economic conference where he led the attacks against you". Bullitt wrote to Roosevelt in May 1937 that "Pairs has become a madhouse" as he found himself overwhelmed with invitations to parties. Bullitt had a low opinion of the embassy staff as in the same letter he wrote "that the Paris staff consists in reality of Offie and myself. We keep going about eighteen hours a day, and I do not know how long I can hold the pace". Though Bullitt found the many parties he had to attend in Paris to be frivolous and despite being something of an Anglophobe, he greatly enjoyed the company of the Duke and Duchess of Windsor.

Bullitt often spoke with Roosevelt on other issues besides Franco-American relations. In 1937 Bullitt visited Warsaw to ask the Polish Foreign Minister, Colonel Józef Beck, to consider allowing the Free City of Danzig to rejoin Germany. In Berlin, Bullitt met with the Four Year Plan Organization chief Hermann Göring; the German Foreign Minister Baron Konstantin von Neurath; and the Reichsbank president Hjalmar Schacht to declare American support for revisions in the international order in favor of Germany. Bullitt wanted to see the Sudetenland go to Germany; for the Free City of Danzig returned to the Reich and the restoration of the German colonial empire in Africa. During the Second Sino-Japanese War, he favored the appeasement of Japan at the expense of China in order to focus American attention on Europe. In November 1937, Roosevelt called for a conference in Brussels of the powers that had signed the 9-Power Treaty of 1922 that guaranteed the independence of China to discuss whatever Japanese aggression violated the 9-Power Treaty or not. Wellington Koo, the Chinese ambassador in Paris, planned to attend the Brussels conference on behalf of his government. Bullitt met with Koo beforehand to ask him not to attend and warned him that the American delegation at the conference would not be taking the lead in opposing Japan. On 7 December 1937, Bullitt advised Roosevelt: "We have large emotional interests in China, small economic interests and no vital interests". Bullitt had gone to Moscow as an advocate of American-Soviet friendship and left Moscow a much disillusioned and embittered man. Kaufmann wrote: "To the extent that Bullitt had formulated a consistent and harmonious view of the situation in Europe, he permitted it to be dominated by his distrust of the Soviet Union". Convinced that the Soviet Union was the greatest danger to the world, Bullitt favored Franco-German rapprochement as he believed that only the Soviet Union would benefit from another world war. Bullitt did not want to see France dominated by Germany, but felt that a Franco-German rapprochement was both possible and desirable. Bullitt's bête noire was the Soviet Union, and he was strongly opposed to the Franco-Soviet alliance of 1935, which he hoped that the French would renounce.

William E. Dodd, the American ambassador in Berlin, accused Bullitt of being "pro-Nazi", though it remains unclear on what grounds that Dodd made that accusation. Bullitt met Hermann Göring several times and mocked him in his reports to Washington for his "German tenor" mannerisms, which he found repulsive. When Göring suggested to Bullitt that Roosevelt should consider the views of five million German-American voters, Bullitt replied that there were "enough trees" in the United States to hang all five million German-Americans if their loyalties to the United States should prove wanting. After a visit to Berlin in 1937, Bullitt reported that the atmosphere in the Auswärtiges Amt was as "cocky as before the war". However, Bullitt still hoped for a Franco-German rapprochement against the Soviet Union and told Bonnet that "such a reconciliation would have the full benediction of the United States". Bullitt had somewhat Anglophobic views and during one of visits to Berlin told Dodd that he cared "not a damn" for Britain. Bullitt distrusted Phipps and held the belief that Phipps had orders from London "to prevent the French from having any tête-à-tête conversations with Germany; the policy of Great Britain is still to keep the Continent of Europe divided...and that little or nothing is to be expected from Great Britain in the way of support of the policy of the reduction of barriers to international commerce and restoration of the economic life of the world". After meeting Dodd several times, Bullitt told Roosevelt that the United States needed a new ambassador in Berlin as "Dodd hates the Nazis too much to be able to do anything with them". In late 1937, Dodd was recalled to the United States and replaced as ambassador to Germany by Hugh Wilson, whom Bullitt approved as a man willing to negotiate with the Nazis.

In January 1938, Roosevelt launched a plan for an international conference in Washington to be hosted by himself to be attended by diplomats from a number of smaller powers such as Sweden, Hungary, the Netherlands, Belgium, Switzerland, Yugoslavia, and Turkey plus three Latin American nations that he yet to choose. The conference was to discuss ways to end the arms race, access to raw materials (an important point as the 1930s was an era of trade wars and protectionism), international law and the rights of neutral nations. The conclusions of the conference were to be presented to the great powers, which Roosevelt believed would somehow end the possibility of another world war. Through Roosevelt planned to host the conference, he also stated that the United States would continue its "traditional policy of freedom from political involvement". Bullitt advised Roosevelt on 20 January 1938 that his proposed conference was "an escape from reality" that no-one would take seriously. Bullitt wrote: "It would be as if in the palmiest days of Al Capone you had summoned a national conference of psychoanalysts in Washington to discuss the psychological causes of crime". Roosevelt dropped his proposed conference when it became clear that no other world leaders were very interested in the idea. On 10 April 1938, a new government was formed in Paris with Daladier as premier and Bonnet as foreign minister. Bullitt was greatly influenced in his reports by his conversations with both Daladier and Bonnet, and the conflicting opinions he received with Bonnet far more in favor of appeasement than Daladier were reflected in his dispatches.

=== The Sudetenland crisis ===
Kaufman described both Kennedy and Bullitt as being more "reporters rather than analysts" whose reports to Washington consisted of "gossip, accounts of conversations with prominent officials in Paris and London, scraps of unassimilated information, rumors, horseback opinions written at the gallop, and predictions". Kennedy had an extremely close friendship with Neville Chamberlain while Bullitt was a very close friend of Daladier, and often the reports of both ambassadors reflected the influence of Chamberlain and Daladier respectively. In May 1938 as the Sudetenland crisis began, Bullitt wrote to Roosevelt that war was not inevitable and predicted that a day would come when the ideological conflicts of the 20th century would seem as "idiotic" to future generations as the wars of religion in the 16th and 17th centuries were now viewed in the 20th century. On 16 May 1938, Bonnet told Bullitt that another war with Germany would be the most destructive war ever and that he "would fight to the limit against the involvement of France in the war". Bonnet told Bullitt that his "whole policy was based on allowing the British full latitude to work out the dispute" because otherwise, France would have to bear the main onus for the concessions that were expected of Czechoslovakia. On 20 May 1938, Bullitt wrote to Roosevelt: "If you believe, as I believe, that it is not in the interest of the United States or civilization as a whole to have the continent of Europe devastated, I think we should attempt to find some way to let the French out of their moral commitment to the Prague government". Bullitt argued that Czechoslovakia was not worth a war as the results would be "the complete destruction of western Europe and Bolshevism from one end of the continent to the other". During the May crisis of 1938, Bonnet showed Bullitt the notes he had exchanged with Phipps and with Victor de Lacroix, the French minister in Prague, which showed that Bonnet was highly adverse to another war with Germany; that the British likewise felt the same; and that Bonnet was extremely angry with President Edvard Beneš for ordering a partial mobilization of the Czechoslovak military over his fears of a German invasion.

On 21 June 1938, Bullitt in "a very private letter that requires no answer" to Roosevelt charged that Bonnet had told him that the Roosevelt administration was about to break American law by shipping 200 war planes to Republican Spain via France. The First Lady, Eleanor Roosevelt, held more leftwing views than her husband, and she had long been pressing him to send aid to Republican Spain despite the arms embargo passed by Congress in January 1937. Gracie Hall Roosevelt, the brother of the First Lady, then arrived in Paris with the claim that the president was indeed in the process of breaking the arms embargo by shipping 200 American aircraft to the Spanish Republicans. When Bullitt stated he had known nothing of this plan, Hall Roosevelt stated he had sent from America by the president to tell him. When informed by Bullitt, the State Department had shut down the scheme.

By the summer of 1938, Bullitt predicted that there was a 50% chance that war would break out in Europe that year. Bullitt put much faith in the mediation mission of Lord Runciman sent to Czechoslovakia to find a peaceful solution to the crisis. Bullitt informed Phipps of his belief that "the last word lies with Lord Runciman, against whom summing up Germany will hardly dare to act". As was often the case, Bullitt was greatly influenced by the last person he spoke to, and his dispatches varied. On 9 July 1938, Bullitt denounced in a newspaper article certain unnamed nations (by which he clearly meant Italy, Germany and Japan) for having resorted to "the murder of defenseless men, women and children" via the bombing of cities (a reference to the bombings of Ethiopian, Spanish and Chinese cities) and stated that "without international morality as without national morality, there can be no human life worth living". Roosevelt did not share Bullitt's inclinations for the appeasement of Japan. When the Treasury Secretary Henry Morgenthau Jr. visited Paris in July 1938, Bullitt followed Roosevelt's orders by introducing him to Wellington Koo for a discussion of American economic aid to China. On 2 September 1938, Bullitt told Phipps that "Hitler had invited M. Herriot and M. Piétri to Nuremberg and that he gathered they were accepting the invitation. This seemed to be a slightly more hopeful sign". During the crisis, Bullitt's main fear was that Soviet "agent provocateurs" would stage an incident that would cause a war that he believed Stalin wanted.

On September 4, 1938, in the midst of the great Sudetenland crisis in Europe that was to culminate in the Munich Agreement on September 30, 1938, during the unveiling of a plaque in France honoring Franco-American friendship, Bullitt stated: "France and the United States were united in war and peace." That led to much speculation in the press that if war broke out over Czechoslovakia, the United States would join the war on the Allied side. On September 9, 1938, however, Roosevelt denied any such intention in a press conference at the White House, saying it was "110% wrong that the United States would join a stop Hitler bloc." The British historian Anthony Adamthwaite noted that Bullitt's Francophilia sometimes got the better of him, and he would make statements about Franco-American friendship that did not reflect the policy of the Roosevelt administration. On 13 September, in a dispatch to the Secretary of State, Cordell Hull, Bullitt stated that a three-power summit to be attended by Chamberlain, Daladier and Hitler was being considered to find a solution to the crisis, and hinted very strongly that Roosevelt should also attend the conference. On 17 September, in a response to the criticism of the undersecretary of state, Sumner Welles, of Anglo-French policy, Bullitt wrote to Roosevelt: "I know of nothing more dishonorable than to urge one nation to go to war, if one is determined not to go to war on the side of that nation". On 24 September 1938, Bullitt urged Roosevelt to call a conference in the Hague to be attended by all of the leaders of the involved states to find an end to the crisis. The next day, Bullitt urged Roosevelt to attend the proposed conference in the Hague and to mediate the crisis, saying to save the peace the United States must become involved in Europe again.

On 27 September 1938, the French Air Minister, Guy La Chambre, told Bullitt the alarming news that the Armée de l'air had only 600 modern aircraft with the rest obsolete vs. the 6,500 modern aircraft that the Deuxième Bureau estimated that the Luftwaffe possessed. La Chambre told Bullitt with much emotion that "the German planes will be able to bomb Paris at will" and "the destruction of Paris would pass all imagination". La Chambre asked Bullitt if he could inquire if it were possible for President Roosevelt to by-pass the Neutrality Act and allow the United States to sell France modern aircraft via Canada. La Chambre suggested that American aviation companies open factories in Detroit and Buffalo to manufacture and ship aircraft parts to Canada, where the planes would be assembled and shipped off to France. In his assessment of the French aviation industry, Bullitt noted that strikes were a regular occurrence in aircraft factories and that French aviation companies used "cottage industry practices" that had long since been abandoned in the United States. In contrast, Charles Lindbergh, who had just returned from a visit to Germany where was treated as an honored guest, presented to Bullitt a glowing picture of the German aviation industry, where the most modern assembly line techniques were employed, no strikes were permitted, and of German aviation of being at the cutting edge of modern technology. Bullitt approved of La Chambre's request, and in turn Roosevelt endorsed the plan when Bullitt presented it to him. It was agreed that Jean Monnet, a French civil servant fluent in English and a specialist in economic matters, would go to the United States to make the necessary arrangements. Monnet had just returned from China and got along very well with Bullitt who shared his "creatively intimate picture of China and Japan". On 30 September 1938, the Munich Agreement was signed that ended the crisis. Upon hearing the news, Bullitt rushed over to Bonnet's apartment with a bouquet of flowers and tears in his eyes as he told Bonnet that this was: "le salut fraternel et joyeux de 'Amérique" ("the fraternal and joyful greeting of America").

=== Anti-appeaser: the aircraft talks ===
On 3 October 1938 over a luncheon, Daladier told Bullitt: "If I had three or four thousand aircraft Munich would had never had happened". Daladier told Bullitt that he had only signed the Munich Agreement because of the weaknesses in the Armée de l'air, and that he very much wanted to buy modern American aircraft to avoid having to sign treaties like the Munich Agreement again. Bullitt reported that: "Daladier sees the situation entirely, clearly, realizes fully that the meeting in Munich was an immense diplomatic defeat for France and England, and recognizes that unless France can recover a united national spirit to confront the future, a fatal situation will arise within a year". On 13 October 1938, Bullitt visited Washington to meet Roosevelt to inform the president about the grave weaknesses in the Armée de l'air. Roosevelt had been unaware that most of the aircraft of the Armée de l'air were antiquated and obsolete aircraft that would have been no match for the modern aircraft of the Luftwaffe, and found Bullitt's reports about the problems in the French aviation industry most worrisome. About his change from a supporter of appeasement to an opponent of appeasement, Kaufman wrote: "It is probably true that Bullitt lacked any studied and reasoned conception of international politics...But intuition, intelligence and wide experience enabled him to see clearly after the rude shock of Munich...The threat to his beloved France now stood forth in stark and ominous outline; a great many of his influential acquaintances were turning their backs on appeasement; the days of illusion had passed". Bullitt advised Roosevelt that Britain and France were "America's first line of defense" and told him that the United States must make its industrial capacity available to both states as he stated that it was the only way to save the peace in Europe.

At a dinner in Washington on 22 October 1938 attended by Roosevelt, Bullitt, Monnet and Morgenthau, the latter objected to the plans for the French to buy American aircraft. Morgenthau stated that France was a "bankrupt, fourth-rate power" and he told Monnet bluntly that according to his information that the French treasury lacked the sum of francs equal to $85 million U.S. dollars needed to buy the 1, 700 aircraft that Monnet indicated the Armée de l'air needed. However, despite his doubts about France's ability to pay for the aircraft, the Jewish Morgenthau, who was easily the most anti-Nazi member of Roosevelt's cabinet, was willing to assist France. Bullitt and Morgenthau devised a scheme that the French government seize the assets of French citizens in American banks to raise the necessary money, a plan that was vetoed by the French Finance Minister, Paul Reynaud, as likely to cause a crisis in France. On 14 November 1938, Bullitt was present at a meeting at the White House where Roosevelt announced a secret plan to deter Germany from war by supplying American aircraft on a gargantuan scale to Great Britain and especially France. During the meeting, Bullitt stated: "The moral is: if you have enough airplanes you don't have to go to Berchtesgaden". Roosevelt concluded: "Had we had this summer 5, 000 planes and the capacity immediately to produce 10, 000 per year, even though I would have to ask Congress for the authority to sell or lend to the countries in Europe, Hitler would not have dared to take the stand he did". Roosevelt's strategy was to ensure American economic and material support to Britain and France on such a scale that Germany would never dare risk a war with those powers, but at the same time do so in such a low-key manner that it would avoiding angering isolationists. Roosevelt took up the suggestion that the aviation factories be located near the Canadian border to have the aircraft assembled in Canada should a war break out in Europe and the Neutrality Act come into force. The British historian D.C. Watt commented that the fatal flaw in Roosevelt's strategy was that secrecy and deterrence are mutually exclusive.

On 9 December 1938, the Comité Permanent de la Défense Nationale chaired by Daladier approved of the plan to send Monnet back to the United States to place an order with American companies for some 1, 000 American aircraft to be delivered to France no later than by July 1939. On 4 January 1939, in his State of the Union address to Congress, Roosevelt repeated his usual nostrums about his hopes for peace, but stated that should a war begin in Europe that the United States should provide material support to Britain and France. Daladier had committed a sum of francs equal to some $65 million U.S. dollars for the first shipment of aircraft, but the question of how France was to pay for additional aircraft remained. Monnet planned for France to create a corporation in Canada that would borrow the money for more aircraft orders, leading to Morgenthau to crossly point out the Johnson act of 1934 forbade loans to nations that defaulted on their World War One debts as the French had done in 1932. On 6 February 1938, Bullitt reported that Daladier had told him that Britain was "a most weak reed on which to lean" and claimed that Chamberlain had proposed international arbitration during the "Dutch war scare" of January 1939, when misinformation appeared that Germany was on the brink of invading the Netherlands. During the same discussion with Bullitt, Daladier let loose a torrent of abuse at various British leaders, calling King George VI "a moron", Queen Elizabeth "an excessively ambitious young woman who would be ready to sacrifice every other country in the world so that she might remain queen", Anthony Eden "a young idiot" and Chamberlain "a desiccated stick". Bullitt in his reports to Roosevelt in late 1938-early 1939 presented a picture of Chamberlain as a leader almost criminally naïve about Germany; stated that Benito Mussolini planned to invade France in the very near-future; and warned that Germany, Italy and Japan would sign a military alliance later that year. The image of the world that Bullitt presented to Roosevelt was France alone and beleaguered facing the combined might of Germany, Italy and Japan while the Chamberlain government was seeking an understanding with the Axis states, which required the United States to be involved in European affairs. As Bullitt along with Welles were Roosevelt's favorite foreign policy advisers, his reports had much influence with the president.

On 13 February 1939, Bullitt met with Daladier and Reynaud, who wanted to use private credits from American banks to pay for more aircraft in an attempt to circumvent the Johnson act, which Bullitt vetoed. Both Daladier and Reynauld apologized to Bullitt for the default of 1932, saying it was an "extremely stupid" thing to have done, but argued that France needed loans to buy more American aircraft immediately. Daladier offered to Bullitt to turn all of the islands of the French West Indies and the French Pacific islands to the United States plus a lump sum payment of ten billion francs to cover the war debts in exchange for the Johnson act being repealed. Roosevelt declined the offer, saying that American isolationists in Congress would see the French offer as a crude bribe meant to embroil the United States in a conflict with Germany. Daladier was so desperate to have American aircraft that at one point that he mused that he would be willing to sell the Palace of Versailles to the United States in exchange for France being allowed to buy American aircraft, saying he needed modern aircraft to ensure the survival of France while the French did not need the Palace of Versailles to ensure national survival.

=== The Danzig crisis ===
During the Danzig crisis, Bullitt was very supportive of France while suffering from extreme stress as he sought to find a way to avoid another world war. During the crisis, Bullitt normally went to bed at midnight and woke up at 3 am as he was worried obsessively about the crisis. At a meeting on 4 April 1939 attended by Daladier, Reynaud, Monnet and Bullitt, Daladier stated he had the power to govern via degree and that "he did not care how many islands it might be necessary to turn to the United States if only the question could be settled". Bullitt reported that both Daladier and Reynaud were "anxious to act quickly" to obtain American aircraft before the Danzig crisis turned into a war. On 11 April 1939, the British Foreign Secretary Lord Halifax wrote to Roosevelt to request that he move much of the U.S. Atlantic fleet to the Pacific Fleet to dissuade the Japanese from taking advantage of the Danzig crisis, a request that Roosevelt had refused. Acting on the knowledge that the British would be more involved in Europe if the Americans were more involved in Asia, St. Léger told Bullitt that the Deuxième Bureau had discovered a secret German-Japanese plan that Japan would attack the British and French colonies in Asia the moment Germany invaded Poland. Prying on popular American stereotypes of Britain in general and the Chamberlain government in particular, St. Léger claimed to Bullitt that pressure from the city had led Chamberlain to decide to send the main part of the Royal Navy to Singapore (the major British naval base in Asia) and accordingly the Danzig crisis was more likely to end in war. Bullitt accepted St. Léger's claims and reported them as fact to Roosevelt, who reversed himself and ordered much of the U.S. Atlantic fleet transferred over the Pacific fleet. In fact, all of St. Léger's claims were false and were intended to have the Americans more involved in the Asia-Pacific region to keep the British engaged in the Danzig crisis.

In April 1939, Bullitt advised Roosevelt that he should denounce Hitler for violating the Munich Agreement by occupying the Czech half of Czecho-Slovakia and the Memelland. Bullitt further advised the president that he must ask Congress to repeal the Neutrality Acts. Bullitt noted that Germany had the world's 2nd largest economy and that the Neutrality Acts in practice favored the Reich by depriving Germany's potential enemies of American arms. On 7 April 1939, Bullitt met with Colonel Beck and Juliusz Łukasiewicz, the Polish ambassador in Paris, to assure them as "Roosevelt's right-hand man in foreign affairs" as he called himself of American sympathy for Poland in the Danzig crisis. Bullitt warned Roosevelt that he must tell the American people that "the acceptance of war is a less horrible alternative than the acceptance of slavery". Much to Bullitt's annoyance, Roosevelt instead on 15 April 1939 sent out a public message to Hitler asking him not to threaten other states. On 16 April 1939, Litvinov proposed an Anglo-French-Soviet alliance to deter Germany from invading Poland. Despite his hatred of the Soviet Union, Bullitt tentatively supported the idea of a "peace front" of the United Kingdom, France and the Soviet Union. Bullitt reported to Roosevelt that Stalin was not to be trusted, but that he agreed with Daladier's statement that "no stone should be left unturned, even though one might expect to find vermin under it". Bullitt called the British negotiating tactics "dilatory and almost insulting" as the British government took weeks to reply to Soviet offers, if at all, and agreed with Daladier that the British were conducting the "peace front" talks in a manner that did not reflect the gravity of the crisis.

On 28 April 1939, Hitler gave a speech before the Reichstag that was a reply to Roosevelt's request, which he ridiculed mercilessly by reading out statements from 34 different governments that they did not feel threatened by the Reich. After Hitler's speech, St. Léger met with Bullitt to tell him that Hitler's response to Roosevelt's request to not threaten his neighbors was to renounce in his speech the 1934 German-Polish non-aggression pact and for the first time in public lay claim to the Free City of Danzig. St. Léger commented upon the aggressive tone of Hitler's speech and argued that the Protectorate of Bohemia and Moravia proved that Hitler was willing to occupy Slavic lands. St. Léger expressed the view that Hitler was probably planning to invade Poland based on his speech. Bullitt reported with astonishment the claim by Phipps who had told Daladier that Hitler's speech opened the door for a peaceful resolution of the Danzig crisis. Bullitt also reported that Daladier had told him that the arch-appeaser Phipps-who was very close to Bonnet-was a "dangerous" man whose mind was full of "nonsense" who should not be serving as the British ambassador in Paris. On 4 May 1939, Litvinov, the longtime Soviet Foreign Commissar and an advocate of collective security was sacked and replaced with Vyacheslav Molotov. Bullitt saw no great significance to Litvinov's firing, which he attributed to a power struggle within the Politburo, writing to Roosevelt that the "anti-Jewish" members of the Politburo such as Andrei Zhdanov, Vyacheslav Molotov, and Andrey Andreyev had

all desired to take foreign policy out of the hands of the Jews. Litvinov's failure to reach an agreement with England offered an excellent opportunity to get rid of Litvinov and his intimate Jewish collaborators.

In 1939, Premier Daladier informed him that French intelligence knew that Alger Hiss in the United States Department of State was working for Soviet intelligence. Bullitt passed the information along to Hiss's superior at the State Department. On 28 June 1939, Daladier told Bullitt that the only way to prevent the Danzig crisis from turning into a war was creating the "peace front" as soon as possible and for Congress to repeal the Neutrality acts as he maintained that otherwise Germany would invade Poland sometime that year. In another meeting with St. Léger on the same day, the secretary-general told Bullitt that "there were eighty chances in a hundred" of the Anglo-French-Soviet negotiations "would be successfully concluded in the near-future". In another meeting with Łukasiewicz on the same day, Bullitt was informed that German soldiers disguised as tourists were entering the Free City in massive numbers while guns were being smuggled into Danzig (under the Treaty of Versailles, the Free City was a demilitarized zone), which led Łukasiewicz to warn him that he feared that war was imminent. On 30 June 1939, St. Léger told Bullitt that his only hopes for stopping the Danzig crisis from turning into a war were a French alliance with the Soviet Union and for the United States to generously provide aid to France, especially in the form of modern aircraft. Roosevelt's attempt to have the Neutrality Act amended was defeated in the House of Representatives in early July 1939. Daladier told Bullitt that the House of Representatives were encouraging Hitler to invade Poland by their opposition to amending the Neutrality Act. Daladier further told Bullitt that he felt it was no accident that the same time that the House had refused to amend the Neutrality Act that the Danzig Nazis were growing more aggressive in various provocations of Poland. The Italian ambassador in Paris, Baron Raffaele Guariglia, presented a protest to Bonnet against Bullitt, accusing him of leaking various unflattening stories about Fascist Italy that appeared in the press in the summer of 1939. On 8 August 1939, Bullitt wrote to R. Walton Moore:

The action of Congress on the Neutrality Act is sickening. The fact is, if war starts and France and England do not get any supplies from the United States, they will be defeated. As a result, Hitler has been encouraged greatly to act this summer.

On 21 August 1939, Daladier showed Bullitt a secret report from the Deuxième Bureau that showed that Germany had started mobilizing and was concentrating Wehrmacht forces on the border with Poland. Daladier stated that the Reich would be ready to "break loose" by the end of the week. Y-Day, the date selected for Fall Weiss ("Case White"), the invasion of Poland was originally set for 26 August 1939, and it was on 25 August that Hitler pushed back the day for Y-day to 1 September. On 22 August 1939, Bullitt phoned Roosevelt to say if there was anything he could "do to avert war, no time should be lost". Later the same day, Bullitt again phoned Roosevelt to say that he should propose a conference in Washington to be attended by all of the leaders of the involved states to end the Danzig crisis. Bullitt stated that Daladier would attend the proposed conference "with deep gratitude". Bullitt told Roosevelt that the Molotov–Ribbentrop pact had destroyed the basis of French strategy as without the Soviet Union as a member of the "peace front", Poland would be swiftly defeated while the introduction of peacetime conscription in Britain had come too late as it would take Britain at least two years to develop a "serious army" capable of facing the Wehrmacht. Bullitt stated that if Germany invaded Poland, France would have to either declare war and bear the blunt of the fighting alone or renounce the alliance with Poland, which would depress French public opinion and allow Hitler to conquer Poland as the prelude to turning west.

=== World War Two ===
On the morning of 1 September 1939, Bullitt was the first to inform Roosevelt that war had broken out in Europe. As Roosevelt was sleeping at about 3: 00 am, he was awakened by a phone call from Bullitt in Paris (where the time was about 11 am) who told him: "Mr. President, several German divisions are deep in Polish territory...There are reports of bombers over the city of Warsaw". Roosevelt replied: "Well, Bill, it has come at last. God help us all!" Roosevelt delayed recognition that war had begun in Europe until 5 September 1939 to allow war material that the British and the French had paid for to be loaded onto ships in American ports. After finally according recognition that war had broken out, the Neutrality Act came into force, which placed a total embargo on the United States selling or shipping "all arms, ammunition or implements of war", which included "aircraft, unassembled, assembled or dismantled" plus all "propellers or air screws, fuselages, hulls, wings, tail units and aircraft engines". Bullitt reported from Paris:

It is, of course, obvious that if the Neutrality Act remains in its present form, France and England will be defeated rapidly.

During the drôle de guerre, Bullitt took a pessimistic line as he warned that most of the aircraft in the Armée de l'air were obsolete, and that as Roosevelt's plans to sell modern American aircraft to France had become stymied by opposition in Congress, that he felt that France was destined to be defeated. Bullitt informed Roosevelt that Maurice Gamelin was very confident that France would not be defeated, but that he did not share his confidence. Bullitt reported that a tour of the Maginot line and the disorganized state of French supplies left him profoundly depressed about the future of France. Bullitt advised the officials of the Quai d'Orsay of loopholes in the Neutrality Acts while urging Roosevelt that he must do more to persuade Congress to revise the Neutrality Acts in a pro-Allied direction. Bullitt constantly pressed Roosevelt on the matter of aircraft for France as he maintained that France needed the largest number of American aircraft possible in order have a chance of victory. Roosevelt persuaded Congress to revise the Neutrality acts to permit the sale of American aircraft to France on 3 November 1939. Bullitt was greatly angered by the Soviet invasion of Finland on 30 November 1939, and urged that the matter be raised at the Assembly of the League of Nations in Geneva. When the League voted to expel the Soviet Union for aggression against Finland, Bullitt was exuberant. In early December 1939, an Anglo-French Co-ordinating Committee whose chairman was Monnet was created to buy American aircraft. Monnet sent René Pleven to the United States to place the orders. On 10 April 1940, Pleven signed contracts for France to buy 2, 400 fighters and 2, 100 bombers with the first deliveries to be made in September 1940. Of the 500 American aircraft purchased by the French in 1938–1939, only 200 Curtis P-36 Hawk fighters had been delivered to France by September 1939. Though the French never received the majority of the aircraft ordered, in 1940 Monnet and Pleven had the orders diverted to Great Britain. The diplomat and future Secretary of State Edward Stettinius Jr. later wrote that the French orders for American aircraft were "...almost revolutionary in their effect upon our aircraft industry and they laid the groundwork for the great expansion that was to come in 1940 and after". Besides for being the largest orders for American aircraft since 1918, the French orders for American aircraft played a key role in the growth of the American machine tool industry, which was thus well placed for the stream of increasingly large orders placed during the war. On 21 March 1940, Daladier's government fell because of his failure to aid Finland as he promised, and the new premier was Paul Reynaud. On 10 May 1940, the Wehrmacht launched Fall Gelb (Case Yellow) and by 16 May 1940 had won the Second Battle of Sedan. After the German broke through the French lines along the Meuse river, Bullitt became desperate in his dispatches to Washington as he wrote the French immediately needed more American aircraft. In a desperate gesture, Bullitt advised Roosevelt to send the U.S. Atlantic fleet on a tour of Greece, Portugal and the international free city of Tangier in a bid to deter Italy from entering the war on the Axis side. Bullitt reported to Roosevelt that the panzers had pushed their way past anti-tank obstacles along the Meuse "as if they did not exist". Welles complained about the "something fantastic" quality of Bullitt's dispatches from Paris as he grew increasingly hysterical though May–June 1940. On 18 May 1940, St. Léger told Bullitt that Reynaud planned to ask Roosevelt to have the United States declare war on Germany. On 31 May 1940, Reynaud made the request while the same day Bullitt asked for the American Atlantic fleet to be sent to Algeria to keep Italy out of the war. Bullitt suggested to Roosevelt and Hull that in May 1940 "that nothing would have a greater restraining influence on Mussolini than a genuine fear that the Pope might leave Rome and take refuge in a neutral country", leading to argue that the Pope should go to the United States. On 29 May 1940, Bullitt in a message to Roosevelt stated:

Al Capone [Mussolini] will enter the war about forth of June, unless you throw the fear of the U.S.A. into him. About U.S. opinion I know nothing, but the only hope in my opinion is for the rest of the Atlantic fleet to follow.

Kaufman noted that for Bullitt the defeat of France was a "personal tragedy" as France was a second homeland to him, the country he loved as almost as much as his own.

On 10 June 1940, Italy declared war on France. Reynaud told Bullitt the same day: "What really distinguished, noble and admirable people the Italians are, to stab us in the back at this moment". Roosevelt used Reynaud's remark in a speech to a group of university students, where he accused Italy of having "stabbed" France in the back. Bullitt had part of the gold reserves of the Banque de France sent to New York; received a promise from Reynaud that the French fleet would not be handed over to Germany; and finally was forced to tell Reynaud that the United States would not declare war on Germany or even provide France with the "clouds of planes" he urgently requested. Bullitt blamed the French defeat on Britain as he accused the British prime minister Winston Churchill of not sending enough Royal Air Force squadrons to France and accused Churchill of seeking to husband the RAF and the Royal Navy in order to improve the British bargaining position to make peace with Germany once France was defeated.

On 12 June 1940, Bullitt was appointed the provisional mayor of Paris to greet the Wehrmacht, which was expected in Paris any day. Bullitt's first act as mayor was to attend Mass at the Notre-Dame, where he wept as he sat in the pew. On 14 June 1940, the Wehrmacht took Paris, and the next day Bullitt watched the victory parade from the balcony of the American embassy on the Place de la Concorde as thousands of German soldiers clad in their grey uniforms marched triumphantly down the Champs-Élysées, following precisely the same route used in 1871.

Bullitt fell out with Roosevelt; they never reconciled. Bullitt insisted on remaining in Paris as the only ambassador of a major nation left when the Germans marched in on 14 June 1940, arguing that "[n]o American ambassador in Paris has ever run away from anything". That angered Roosevelt, who believed Bullitt should have followed the French government to Bordeaux to look after US interests. The French cabinet was divided between those who wanted to sign an armistice with Germany vs. those who felt that French government should relocate to Algiers (at the time Algeria was considered an integral part of France) to continue the war. The French cabinet became increasingly divided over the question of an armistice, and on 16 June 1940, Reynaud, who favored continuing the war from Algeria, was ousted for Marshal Philippe Pétain, whose first act was to ask for an armistice. On 21 June 1940, France signed an armistice with Germany.

Roosevelt believed that if Bullitt had been present in Bordeaux, he could have used his influence to press for continuing the war from Algeria. The Interior Secretary, Harold L. Ickes, normally a friend and ally of Bullitt, wrote in his diary that Bullitt had acted foolishly by choosing to stay in Paris, and that Roosevelt was furious with him. On 30 June 1940, Bullitt went to Vichy to meet the new premier, Marshal Philippe Pétain along with Marshal Maxime Weygand, Admiral François Darlan, and President Albert Lebrun. In one of his last reports to Roosevelt, Bullitt wrote that the new leaders of Vichy have

...accepted completely for France the fate of becoming a province of Nazi Germany... Their hope is that France may became Germany's favorite province.

Pétain asked for dictatorial powers from the Assemblée nationale, a request that was granted. On 13 July 1940 Bullitt reported to Roosevelt after watching the Assemblée nationale vote itself out of existence earlier that day:"The death of the French Republic was drab, undignified and painful".

Roosevelt was deeply unhappy that Bullitt had stayed in Paris instead of going to Bordeaux, though he did receive Bullitt at the Roosevelt family home of Hyde Park upon his return to the United States. Bullitt predicted to Roosevelt that Britain would soon be defeated or make peace with Germany, and he warned the president that Hitler was intent upon invading South America as the prelude to an invasion of the United States. Once thought of as a potential cabinet member, he now found his career blocked. In a sign of presidential disfavor, Roosevelt appointed a new American ambassador to France (the United States recognized the Vichy government until November 1942), Admiral William D. Leahy. Instead, Roosevelt told Bullitt to make speeches that he dared not make himself in the midst of a presidential election about the war. On 18 August 1940, Bullitt gave a speech before 4,000 people in front of Independence Hall in Philadelphia, where he urged Americans to "wake up" as he warned that Nazi Germany was intent upon the conquest of the world. Bullitt stated the French felt secure behind the Maginot Line until it was too late, and he warned that Germany with the world's second largest economy was quite capable of projecting its power into the New World. Bullitt ended his speech on a stark note as he stated that the Reich had the ability, means, the will and the desire to conquer the United States as he warned that the Atlantic Ocean was not an impassable barrier for Germany.

== Campaign against Sumner Welles ==
In the late 1930s, the US State Department was divided by rivalry between Secretary of State Cordell Hull and Undersecretary Sumner Welles, who was Roosevelt's favorite. Bullitt, who disliked Welles, was allied with Hull and Department Counselor R. Walton Moore. Roosevelt had little respect for the abilities of Hull-who tended to move too slowly for his liking-and preferred to rely upon Welles. Welles had attended Groton private school and Harvard just as Roosevelt had, and Bullitt was intensely jealous of the fact that the Welles was closer to his fellow Groton-Harvard man Roosevelt than him. Roosevelt's secretary and Bullitt's one-time fiancée, Marguerite LeHand, recalled that Bullitt "desperately wanted" to be the undersecretary at the State Department, all the more so because of Roosevelt's tendency to by-pass Hull. The homosexuality of Welles was an open secret amongst elite circles in Washington and one who knew that secret was Bullitt. By late 1940, it was clear that Bullitt's career was stalled. Roosevelt had promised him several times in 1939 and 1940 that he would appoint him Navy Secretary when he returned to the United States, but instead appointed the Republican Frank Knox to that office in 1940. The American historians Will Brownell and Richard N. Billings noted that faced with setbacks to his career, Bullitt tended to react in a petulant manner by lashing out in a style both destructive to others and to himself.

In September 1940, a drunken Welles propositioned two male railroad porters. Bullitt learned of the incident through Moore, who, at his death, passed affidavits to Bullitt that were sworn by the porters who had been propositioned. Bullitt used that information to campaign for Welles's resignation. Roosevelt long resisted taking any action against Welles. Elliott Roosevelt later wrote that his father believed that Bullitt had bribed the porters to make overtures to Welles to entrap him. Bullitt was normally tolerant of homosexuality and his private secretary, Carmel Offie was more or less openly gay, but he chose to make an issue of the incident with the porters as a way to destroy the career of Welles, a man he greatly hated and whose job he had long desired. On April 23, 1941, Bullitt confronted Roosevelt with his evidence, but Roosevelt refused to yield to Bullitt's demands and dismissed him from any further significant duties with the State Department. Bullitt argued to Roosevelt that the "unfortunate weakness" of Welles for black men made him open to blackmail. At one point, Roosevelt suggested to Hull that Bullitt should be appointed ambassador to Liberia, one of the worst postings in the Foreign Service.

After Operation Barbarossa was launched on 22 June 1941, Bullitt predicted a swift Soviet defeat, which undermined his standing with Roosevelt as the Soviet Union did not collapse as he predicted. On 23 June 1941, Welles told a press conference that the United States would supply Lend-Lease aid to the Soviet Union, which Bullitt protested against. Bullitt demanded that the Roosevelt impose conditions as the price of Lend-Lease aid and was furious when the president ignored his advice. On 7 December 1941, Bullitt was on vacation in Trinidad and Tobago when he heard the news on the radio that the Japanese had bombed Pearl Harbor. Bullitt rushed back to Washington out of the expectation that Roosevelt would give him an office now that the United States was at war. On 11 December 1941, Italy and Germany both declared war on the United States. In an attempt to stop the campaign against Welles, Roosevelt appointed Bullitt as his ambassador-at-large for Africa and the Middle East in December 1941. Bullitt made a whirlwind tour later that month, visiting several of France's African colonies held by the Free French along with Egypt, Palestine, Lebanon, Syria, Saudi Arabia and Iran. Upon his return to Washington, Bullitt presented to Roosevelt a largely negative picture of the British 8th Army in Egypt, which lost with monotonous regularity to the Afrika Korps, which led Bullitt to argue that United States would have to carry the main burden of the war against Germany.

In 1942, Bullitt pushed the story about Welles to Vice President Henry A. Wallace and to Hull. Roosevelt told Wallace that Bullitt ought to "burn in hell" for what he was saying about Welles. On 17 June 1942, Roosevelt offered Bullitt the chance to serve as the American minister-plenipotentiary to Australia, which at the time was threatened with a Japanese invasion, which Bullitt declined under the grounds that Australia was too unimportant of a country for him to serve in. Instead, Bullitt took on a vaguely defined job as the special assistant for to the Navy Undersecretary James Forrestal. In July 1942, Bullitt was part of an American delegation to London that consisted of General Dwight D. Eisenhower, Harry Hopkins, General George C. Marshall, and Admiral Ernest J. King. Bullitt met with Winston Churchill on 17 July 1942 and with General Charles de Gaulle on 20 July 1942. During the discussions with the British leaders, Bullitt much to the surprise of everyone supported Admiral King in his "Asia First" grand strategy, which led General Marshall-who supported the "Europe First" strategy-to ban him from the meetings. The conference ended with an agreement that there would be no landings in France in 1942 as Marshall had wanted, but that the Americans would land in French Morocco in November 1942 to link up with the 8th Army in Egypt, a choice that Eisenhower told Bullitt that he did not approve of. During the London conference, both Bullitt and Offie (who had gone with Bullitt to London) were discovered leaking information about the conference to journalists, which further alienated Roosevelt. Offie was arrested for leaking information to the press, and was only saved from prosecution when it emerged that he had been acting upon Bullitt's orders. On his way home, Bullitt stopped in Dublin on 19 August 1942 to meet Éamon de Valera and asked him for permission for American air and naval forces to use Ireland as a base for anti-submarine operations along the North Atlantic run.

As the war went on, Bullitt grew obsessed with the fear that the inability of the Anglo-American forces to open up a Second Front in Europe would lead to Soviet domination of Europe after the war. Bullitt in a letter to Roosevelt dated 29 January 1943 stated that Stalin wanted his forces "as far west as the Rhine, perhaps even beyond" as he predicted that Soviet forces would impose Communists regimes on any area that they occupied. Bullitt favored opening a Second Front as soon as possible in order to push Anglo-American forces deep into Eastern Europe. In a memo dated 12 May 1943, Bullitt criticized Roosevelt's "Europe First" grand strategy, arguing that it would only benefit the Soviet Union and Great Britain as American resources would to be expended on the defeat of Japan after the defeat of Germany while both the Soviets and the British would be allowed to rebuild. Bullitt called for an "Asia First" grand strategy as he argued that the United States had a vested interest in seeing both the United Kingdom and the Soviet Union emerge victorious from the war, but as weakened as much as possible. Bullitt's memo was leaked to the press (almost certainly by Bullitt himself), which led to Churchill to implicitly respond in an address to Congress on 19 May 1943 where he stated "...let one suggest that we British have not at least as great an interest as the United States in the unstinting and relentless waging of war against Japan". On 16 June 1943, the columnist Drew Pearson wrote in his popular "Washington Merry-go-round" column that the War Secretary Henry L. Stimson had written on the margin of Bullitt's memo that it "did not serve the purposes of the country". The column led to a very public war of words between Bullitt and Stimson with Bullitt claiming that Stimson had questioned his American patriotism while Stimson rather unconvincingly denied that he had written what Pearson had claimed he did, but he stated to the press that he disapproved of Bullitt's memo. When Roosevelt told Bullitt that he did not agree with the "Asia First" grand strategy he advocated or his claims about Stalin's postwar aims, Bullitt blamed Welles along with Hopkins, both of whom he believed were misleading Roosevelt.

Joining Bullitt in the campaign against Welles was Offie who spread rumors with the press that Welles was gay. In early 1943, Hull began to demand Welles' removal under the grounds that he was open to blackmail. Bullitt now informed Senator Owen Brewster, a Republican, a strong opponent of Roosevelt. Brewster threatened a senatorial inquiry. The potential scandal finally forced Roosevelt to act, and on September 30, 1943, Welles resigned. Roosevelt remained very angry with Bullitt and refused to give him any other government post. Roosevelt was deeply hurt by the way that Welles's career had been wrecked, and he told Adolf A. Berle the day after Welles had resigned a story about how when Welles and Bullitt died, St. Peter would allow Welles to enter Heaven and would refuse to allow Bullitt to enter Heaven for having "destroyed a fellow human being". Shortly afterwards, Bullitt was released from his position as the special assistant to Forrestal.

== Military service ==
Much to his annoyance, Bullitt was denied a commission in the US Armed Forces by Roosevelt. Roosevelt suggested to Bullitt to run for Mayor of Philadelphia as a Democrat in 1943, but Roosevelt secretly told the Democratic leaders there, "Cut his throat." Bullitt's Republican opponent published excepts from Bullitt's articles from 1916 where he praised Kaiser Wilhelm II as a great leader; attacked him for his "pornographic" novel It's Not Done that featured a thinly disguised version of Ernesta Drinker, whom he noted was a member of one of Philadelphia's most prominent families; and for his marriage to the Communist Louise Bryant and for fathering an illegitimate daughter by her. Bullitt was defeated. In February 1944, Hull asked Roosevelt to give Bullitt a major diplomatic post, leading Roosevelt to say that Bullitt could serve as the minister-plenipotentiary to Saudi Arabia as he had heard that life in Riyadh was extremely unpleasant for Westerners, but that otherwise no diplomatic posts were open to him. Bullitt declined the offer of serving as the minister in Riyadh as he stated that life in ultra-puritanical Saudi Arabia was not for him. Bullitt declared in a letter dated 1 May 1944 to the War Secretary Henry L. Stimson:

I speak French almost as easily as I speak English, and have had many experiences in maintaining the most friendly relations with French civilians and military men in difficult hours. Could I serve as a liaison with the French forces?...The fight to drive the Germans out of France is my fight to a peculiar degree. I profoundly want to get into activity...Cannot the Army use me?

After not answering his letters, Stimson finally wrote back to tell Bullitt that while there would be no officer's commission for him in the U.S. Army because of what he did to Welles, he was free to enlist as a private. Bullitt joined the Free French Forces instead. Bullitt wrote to Charles de Gaulle in Algiers offering his services and on 25 May 1944 received the response:

Come now! Good and dear American friend, our ranks are open to you. You will return with us to a wounded Paris. Together, we will see your star-spangled banners mingled with our tricolors.

Much to his joy, Bullitt joined the Free French forces based in Algeria while also serving as a correspondent for Life. Bullitt received the rank of commandant (the equivalent rank to a major) in the Free French Army and served on the staff of General Jean de Lattre de Tassigny, known as Jean le roi to his men. Bullitt felt much gratitude for de Gaulle for giving him the commission that Roosevelt had denied him. On 15 August 1944, Operation Dragoon, the Allied invasion of the south of France started, and Bullitt served with the 1st French Army commanded by de Lattre de Tassigny. On 25 August 1944, Paris was liberated, and Bullitt insisted on visiting the French capital. On 28 August 1944, the 1st French Army liberated Marseilles and began a drive up the Rhone river valley into the Vosges mountains, and from there into Alsace. De Lattre de Tassigny spoke no English and Bullitt served as his translator when he met with American officers. On 14 October 1944, Bullitt wrote in a letter to his brother:

Paris is a bit sad as there are no lights and no restaurants except in a few hotels - but the French are as delightful as ever.

Bullitt unlocked the American embassy and as he mounted the balcony was cheered by a large crowd of Parisians who mistook him for Dwight Eisenhower.

On 9 January 1945, Bullitt was run over by a vehicle during the fighting in Alsace and spent the two months in a hospital. Bullitt never fully recovered from the back injury he suffered. In March 1945, he returned to the staff of the 1st French Army as it advanced into Germany. As a joke, de Lattre de Tassigny made Bullitt the governor of Baden-Baden, which American journalists reported as the truth. On 8 May 1945, de Lattre de Tassigny signed on behalf of France the armistice with Germany and Bullitt was present at the ceremony. On 14 July 1945, Bullitt took part in the Bastille Day parade down the Champs-Élysées, riding in the same car as de Lattre de Tassigny.

== The Cold War ==
Between 1941 and 1945, Bullitt wrote volumes of stories and social commentary on the dangers of fascism and communism. In the postwar years, he became a militant anticommunist. At the same time, he also believed that extending the 1919 Bullitt Commission and the negotiations with Lenin would have been constructive. Bullitt became a militant critic of the foreign policy of the Roosevelt administration, which he described as soft on communism. In his 1946 book The Great Globe Itself, Bullitt was extremely critical of Roosevelt's policies towards the Soviet Union, which characterized as appeasement of Stalin.

Bullitt sought a post with the new Democratic president Harry S. Truman, who refused him. Clark Clifford warned the president that Bullitt had a habit of turning against the presidents he served as he noted that he turned against both Wilson and Roosevelt. In 1947, Bullitt was greatly alarmed by the popularity of the French Communist party, which he believed was turning France into a Communist dictatorship after the liberation as he complained that French Communists occupied too many posts in the government, and put his hopes into de Gaulle as France's "savior" from Communism. Bullitt had a tendency for hero-worship, which colored his writings on his friend de Gaulle, but he expressed concern that even de Gaulle might not be able to stop the French Communists.

Moving increasingly to the right, Bullitt attached himself to the China Lobby, which favored the support of the Kuomintang regime. In 1947, Henry Luce hired Bullitt for some $13, 000 dollars to work as the "special correspondent" of Life on China. Bullitt was then sent off on a tour of China to report on the war. On 13 October 1947, Life published an article by Bullitt entitled "Report on China" that began with question posed in capital letters: "CAN CHINA BE KEPT OUT OF THE HANDS OF STALIN?" Bullitt advocated American support for the Kuomintang, who were losing the Chinese civil war to the Chinese Communists as he wrote: "If China falls into the hands of Stalin, all of Asia including Japan will sooner or later fall into his hands". Bullitt advocated that the United States provide the Republic of China with some $1.35 billion in aid with some $75 million to go for the stabilization of the inflation-weakened Chinese dollar immediately; another $75 million for further stabilization of the Chinese economy over the next three years; and some $600 million for the modernization of the National Revolutionary Army. Finally, Bullitt advocated that the United States pay for and train some 10 new divisions of the National Revolutionary Army, which would lead an offensive to retake Manchuria, which had lost to the Communist People's Liberation Army earlier that year. Manchuria, a region with some 34 million people was known as the industrial heartland of China, a center of heavy industry, and its loss to the Communists alongside the best divisions of the National Revolutionary Army that had sent to hold it had been major blows to the Kuomintang regime. The media mogul Luce ensured that Bullitt's "Report on China" was given widespread publicity.

Though Bullitt did not speak Mandarin, the Republican-controlled Congress had Bullitt testify as an expert witness on China that the policies of the Truman administration would lead to the "loss" of China. Bullitt testified: "The independence of the U.S. will not last a generation longer than the independence of China". As the resident Asia expert for the Luce media empire, another article by Bullitt was published in Life in December 1947, this time on the war in French Indochina. Bullitt had made visit to French Indochina to see the war himself in the fall of 1947. Bullitt admitted that much of the Vietnamese population wanted independence from France, and called Ho Chi Minh an "intelligent, completely selfless man endowed with great personal charm". However, Bullitt advocated that Vietnam be granted independence within the French Union and he wrote that the victory of the Viet Minh would replace "the yoke of France by the terrible yoke of Stalin". The Vietnamese leader whom Bullitt favored was the playboy Emperor Bảo Đại who was living in exile in Hong Kong. Bullitt advocated greater American involvement in south-east Asia to preserve French Indochina and testified before the Senate Foreign Relations Committee that if France failed in Vietnam, "the U.S. should perhaps take a hand in the matter". Bullitt's association with the China Lobby and his criticism of the Truman administration for in his view not providing sufficient support for the Kuomintang marked his estrangement from the Democrats.

In 1948, Bullitt left the Democratic Party and joined the Republican party. Bullitt expected the Republican candidate, Governor Thomas E. Dewey of New York, to win the election and wanted to serve as secretary of state in the expected Dewey administration. In his 1948 article "How We Won The War and Lost the Peace" in Life, Bullitt criticized Roosevelt's foreign policy towards the Soviet Union as one of endless blunders and concluded: "Russia will be able to mobilize the manpower and industrial strength of China and Japan for its ultimate assault on the United States". In an upset victory, Truman who had widely expected to lose the 1948 election was elected by a very narrow margin. Bullitt grew increasingly preoccupied with China from 1948 onward as the Chinese Communists continued their string of victories, which he portrayed in his articles as a result of the policies of the Truman administration.

In 1952, Bullitt appeared with Senator Richard Nixon at Georgetown University to criticize the foreign policy of the Truman administration, especially in Asia, as "soft on communism". In the 1952 election, Bullitt endorsed the Republican candidate, Dwight Eisenhower, and when Eisenhower won the election, lobbied hard for a post in the new administration. However, Eisenhower found Bullitt's views on the Soviet Union to be too extreme for his liking, and told his chief of staff, Sherman Adams, that he did not want to see Bullitt. Unhappy with the unwillingness of Eisenhower to give him a post, in June 1953, Bullitt went to Seoul to denounce the soon-to-concluded armistice that ended the Korean War as a sell-out. Bullitt was usually abroad in the last years as he owned a cottage in Taiwan that was close to the residence of Chiang Kai-shek and rented an expensive apartment in Paris.

In the August 24, 1954, issue of Look, in his article "Should We Support an Attack on Red China?", he proposed an immediate attack on Communist China and asserted that the United States should "reply to the next Communist aggression by dropping bombs on the Soviet Union." In 1954, Bullitt's friendship with Chiang Kai-shek ended and he ceased visiting Taiwan. A servant had held a party in Bullitt's house in Taiwan while he was on a visit to the United States without his permission, which was a crime under Chinese law. Bullitt asked Chiang to drop the prosecution, and when he refused, he ceased speaking to him. In 1964, Bullitt broke with de Gaulle when France recognized the People's Republic of China as the legitimate government of China, which greatly angered him.

The biography of Wilson that was co-written by Bullitt and Freud in the 1920s was published in 1966. It argued that Wilson resolved his Oedipus complex by becoming highly neurotic, casting his father as God and himself as Christ, the savior of mankind, which ruined the Versailles Treaty. The biography was delayed for decades due to fear it would end Bullitt's political career, and Bullitt feared the themes of Wilson's alleged homosexuality and religious issues would do more harm in the fight against communism. The thesis put forward by Bullitt and Freud was that Wilson during the Paris peace conference had suffered an "extraordinary mental disintegration" caused by his issues with his overbearing father, the Presbyterian preacher Thomas Wilson. Freud and Bullitt claimed that Wilson had envisioned his principle domestic opponent, the Republican senator Henry Cabot Lodge, as a "father representative" and thus could not compromise with Lodge as it brought back too many negative memories of his submission as a boy to his father. Simultaneously they argued his deference to Clemenceau was based on the Frenchman as another "father representative". The co-authors argued that Wilson was delusional in 1919 as his mind was in a "wild flight from fact". Bullitt and Freud claimed that Wilson, a deeply religious man whose values were powerfully shaped by his Calvinist upbringing, chose to cast himself as a Christ figure who sacrificed himself as "the Savior of the World". The book received a reception that was almost unanimously hostile. The historian A. J. P. Taylor called it a "disgrace" and asked, "How did anyone ever manage to take Freud seriously?" The American historian Lloyd Ambrosius wrote the key assumptions made by Freud and Bullitt, namely that the Treaty of Versailles was a mockery of the 14 Points and that Wilson could have if had wanted to, forced the other leaders at the Paris Peace Conference to accept his vision of the peace, were both wrong.

Bullitt died in Neuilly-sur-Seine, France, on February 15, 1967, and is buried in Woodlands Cemetery in Philadelphia.

== Works ==
Books:

- Foreign policy
  - The Bullitt Mission to Russia (New York: Huebsch, 1919)
  - The Great Globe Itself (New York: Scribner's, 1946)
- Biography
  - Thomas Woodrow Wilson: A Psychological Study (Boston: Houghton Mifflin 1967), with Sigmund Freud
- Novel
  - It's Not Done (New York: Harcourt Brace, 1926)

Articles:

- "How We Won the War and Lost the Peace" Part I, Life (August 30, 1948)
- "How We Won the War and Lost the Peace" Part II, Life (September 6, 1948)

== See also ==
- Carmel Offie, secretary to Bullitt

== Sources ==
- Adamthwaite, Anthony (1977). France and the Coming of the Second World War, 1936-1939. London: Taylor & Francis. ISBN 9781000352788.
- Alexander, Martin S. "Safes and houses: William C. Bullitt, embassy security and the shortcomings of the US foreign service in Europe before the second world war." Diplomacy and Statecraft 2.2 (1991): 187–210.
- Ambrosius, Lloyd E. (February 1987). "Woodrow Wilson's Health and the Treaty Fight, 1919-1920". The International History Review. 9 (1): 73–84. doi:10.1080/07075332.1987.9640434.
- Bennett, Edward (1997). "William Christian Bullitt". In Cathal J. Nolan (ed.). Notable U.S. Ambassadors Since 1775 A Biographical Dictionary. Westport: Greenwood Press. ISBN 9780313291951.
- Bowers, Robert E. (September 1965). "Senator Arthur Robinson of Indiana Vindicated: William Bullitt's Secret Mission to Europe". Indiana Magazine of History. 61 (3): 189–204.
- Brownell, Will; Billings, Richard (1987). So Close to Greatness: The Biography of William C. Bullitt. New York: Macmillan. ISBN 0-02-517410-X.
- Campbell, J. F. " 'To Bury Freud on Wilson': Uncovering Thomas Woodrow Wilson, A Psychological Study, by Sigmund Freud and William C. Bullitt." Modern Austrian Literature 41.2 (2008) pp 41–56 Online
- Cassella-Blackburn, Michael (2004). The Donkey, the Carrot, and the Club: William C. Bullitt and Soviet-American relations, 1917-1948. Greenwood.. Online
- Cameron, Elizabeth (1953). "Alexis Saint-Léger-Léger". In Gordon A. Craig & Felix Gilbert (ed.). The Diplomats 1919-1939. Princeton: Princeton University Press. pp. 378–405.
- Chura, Patrick (2008). "O'Neill's Strange Interlude and the "Strange Marriage" of Louise Bryant". The Eugene O'Neill Review. 30: 7–20. doi:10.2307/29784851. JSTOR 29784851. S2CID 248788267.
- Craft, Stephen G. V.K. (2004). Wellington Koo and the Emergence of Modern China. Lexington: University Press of Kentucky.
- Etkind, Alexander (2017). Roads Not Taken An Intellectual Biography of William C. Bullitt. Pittsburg: University of Pittsburgh Press. ISBN 9780822983200.
- Duroselle, Jean-Baptiste (2004). France and the Nazi Threat: The Collapse of French Diplomacy 1932-1939. New York: Enigma Books.
- Farnsworth, Beatrice. William C. Bullitt and the Soviet Union (Indiana UP, 1967).
- Herzstein, Robert E. (1994). Henry R. Luce, Time, and the American crusade in Asia. Cambridge: Cambridge University Press. ISBN 9780521835770.
- Kaufmann, William (1953). "Two American Ambassadors: Bullitt and Kennedy". In Gordan A. Craig & Felix Gilbert (ed.). The Diplomats, 1919–1939. Princeton: Princeton University Press. pp. 649–681.
- Kennedy, David (1999). Freedom From Fear The American People in Depression and War, 1929-1945. Oxford: Oxford University Press.
- Keylor, William (1997). "France and the Illusion of American Support 1919-1940". In Joel Blatt (ed.). The French Defeat of 1940 Reassessments. Providence, Rhode Island: Berghahn Books. pp. 204–244.
- Marks, Frederick (December 1985). "Six between Roosevelt and Hitler: America's Role in the Appeasement of Nazi Germany". The Historical Journal. 28 (4): 969–982. doi:10.1017/S0018246X00005173. S2CID 159850703.
- MacMillan, Margaret (2001). Paris 1919: Six Months That Changed the World. New York: Random House. ISBN 9780307432964.
- McVickar Haight Jr, John (January 1964). "France's First War Mission to the United States". The Air Power Historian. 11 (1): 11–15.
- McKean, David. Watching Darkness Fall: FDR, His Ambassadors, and the Rise of Adolf Hitler. (St. Martin's Press, 2017). ISBN 9781250206985
- Pipes, Richard (1993). Russia Under the Bolshevik Regime. New York: Knopf Doubleday Publishing Group. ISBN 9780679761846.
- Tierney, Dominic (July 2004). "Franklin D. Roosevelt and Covert Aid to the Loyalists in the Spanish Civil War, 1936-39". Journal of Contemporary History. 39 (3): 299–313. doi:10.1177/0022009404044440. S2CID 159727256.
- Tung, William (1977). V. K. Wellington Koo and China's Wartime Diplomacy. Queens: Center of Asian Studies, St. John's University.
- Thayer, Charles Wheeler, Bears in the Caviar (NY: Lippincott, 1951)
- Watt, Donald Cameron (1989). How War Came The Immediate Origins of the Second World War, 1938-1939. London: Heinemann.
- Weisbrode, Kenneth. "The Unruly Spirit: William Bullitt 1936-1940," in Diplomats at War: The American Experience, eds. J. Simon Rofe and Andrew Stewart (Republic of Letters, 2013) ISBN 978-9089791092.
- Whitman, Alden, "Energetic Diplomat; William C. Bullitt, First U.S. Envoy to Soviet, Dies," obituary in the New York Times, February 16, 1967 available online

=== Primary sources ===
- Bullitt, Orville (brother of William C. Bullitt) For the President: Personal and Secret. Correspondence Between Franklin D. Roosevelt and William C. Bullitt (1972).
- Bullitt, William Christian. "The Bullitt Mission to Russia: Testimony Before the Committee on Foreign Relations, United States Senate" (1919). Online also online
- Bullitt, William Christian (1946). The Great Globe Itself: a Preface to World Affairs. New York: Transaction Publishers. Archived from the original on June 17, 2019 – via Questia.
- Dearborn, Mary V. (1996). Queen of Bohemia: The Life of Louise Bryant. New York: Houghton Mifflin Company. ISBN 978-0-395-68396-5.

Diplomatic posts
Preceded by David R. Francis (Embassy closed from 1919 to 1933)	U.S. Ambassador to the Soviet Union; 1933–1936	Succeeded by Joseph E. Davies
Preceded by Jesse I. Straus	U.S. Ambassador to France; 1936–1940	Succeeded by William D. Leahy
