= Electoral history of Arlen Specter =

List of elections featuring Arlen Specter as a candidate

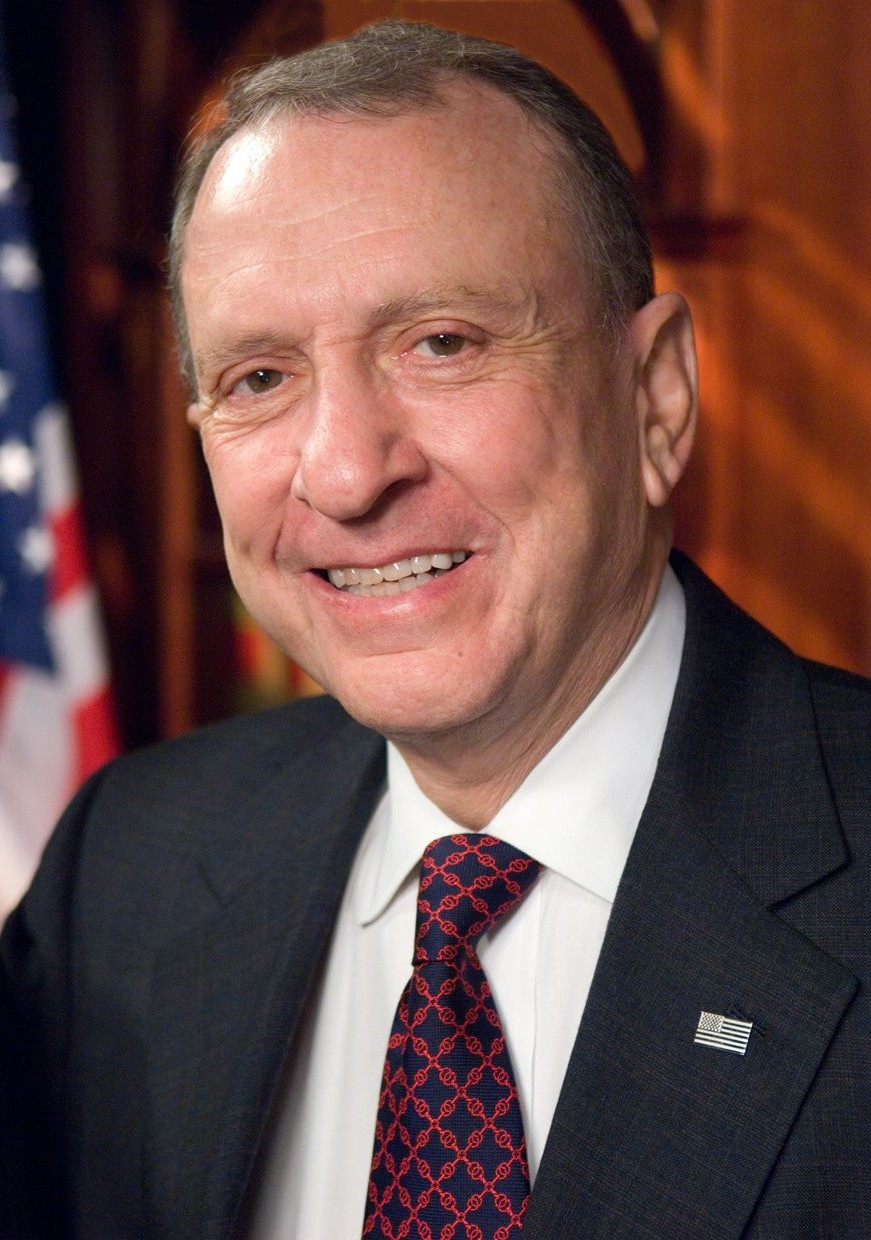
Specter during the 110th Congress

Electoral history of Arlen Specter, former United States Senator from Pennsylvania (1981–2011), Chairman of the Senate Committees on Intelligence (1995–1997), Veterans' Affairs (1997–2001, 2001 and 2003–2005) and Judiciary (2005–2007), as well as a candidate for the 1996 Republican presidential nomination.

Originally a Democrat, Specter switched to the Republican Party in 1965 and to the Democrats again in 2009.

== 1960s ==
1965 Philadelphia District Attorney Election:

- James C. Crumlish Jr. (D) (inc.) – 289,522 (46.90%)
- Arlen Specter (R) – 327,787 (53.10%)

1967 Philadelphia mayoral election:

- James Tate (D) (inc.) – 353,326 (48.97%)
- Arlen Specter (R) – 342,578 (47.48%)
- Joseph J. Frieri (Constitution) – 9,931 (1.38%)
- Cecil B. Moore (Political Freedom Rights) – 9,031 (1.25%)
- Leonard L. Smalls (Conservative) – 6,675 (0.93%)

1969 Philadelphia District Attorney Election:

- David Berger (D) – 244,544 (40.96%)
- Arlen Specter (R) (inc.) – 346,294 (58.00%)
- Richard Ash (Consumer) – 6,189 (1.04%)

== 1970s ==
1973 Philadelphia District Attorney election:

- Emmett Fitzpatrick (D) – 231,505 (53.48%)
- Arlen Specter (R) (inc.) – 201,342 (46.52%)

Republican primary for the 1976 United States Senate election in Pennsylvania:

- John Heinz III – 358,715 (37.84%)
- Arlen Specter – 332,513 (35.08%)
- George R. Packard – 160,379 (16.92%)
- C. Homer Brown – 46,828 (4.94%)
- Mary E. Folts – 29,160 (3.08%)
- Francis Worley – 20,421 (2.15%)

Republican primary for the 1978 Pennsylvania gubernatorial election:

- Dick Thornburgh – 325,376 (34.55%)
- Arlen Specter – 206,802 (21.96%)
- Bob Butera – 190,653 (20.24%)
- David W. Marston – 161,813 (17.18%)
- Henry Hager – 57,119 (6.07%)

== 1980s ==
Republican primary for the 1980 United States Senate election in Pennsylvania:

- Arlen Specter – 419,372 (36.40%)
- Bud Haabestad – 382,281 (33.18%)
- Edward L. Howard – 148,200 (12.86%)
- Norman Bertasavage – 52,408 (4.55%)
- Andrew J. Watson – 43,992 (3.82%)
- Warren R. Williams – 38,164 (3.31%)
- Lewis C. Richards – 36,982 (3.21%)
- Francis Worley – 30,660 (2.66%)

1980 United States Senate election in Pennsylvania:

- Arlen Specter (R) – 2,230,404 (50.48%)
- Pete Flaherty (D) – 2,122,391 (48.04%)
- Linda Mohrbacher (Socialist Workers) – 27,229 (0.62%)
- David K. Walter (Libertarian) – 18,595 (0.42%)
- Lee Frissell (Consumer) – 16,089 (0.36%)
- Frank Kinces (Communist) – 3,334 (0.08%)

Republican primary for the 1986 United States Senate election in Pennsylvania:

- Arlen Specter (inc.) – 434,623 (76.21%)
- Richard A. Stokes – 135,673 (23.79%)

1986 United States Senate election in Pennsylvania:

- Arlen Specter (R) (inc.) – 1,906,537 (56.44%)
- Bob Edgar (D) – 1,448,219 (42.87%)
- Lance Haver (Consumer) – 23,470 (0.70%)

== 1990s ==
Republican primary for the 1992 United States Senate election in Pennsylvania:

- Arlen Specter (inc.) – 683,118 (65.08%)
- Stephen F. Freind – 366,608 (34.92%)

1992 United States Senate election in Pennsylvania:

- Arlen Specter (R) (inc.) – 2,358,125 (48.90%)
- Lynn Yeakel (D) – 2,244,966 (46.55%)
- John F. Perry (LBT) – 219,319 (4.55%)

1995 Iowa Republican straw poll:

- Bob Dole – 2,582 (24.38%)
- Phil Gramm – 2,582 (24.38%)
- Pat Buchanan – 1,922 (18.15%)
- Lamar Alexander – 1,156 (10.91%)
- Alan Keyes – 804 (7.59%)
- Morry Taylor – 803 (7.58%)
- Richard Lugar – 466 (4.40%)
- Pete Wilson – 123 (1.16%)
- Bob Dornan – 87 (0.82%)
- Arlen Specter – 67 (0.63%)

1996 Republican Party presidential primaries:

- Bob Dole – 9,024,742 (58.82%)
- Pat Buchanan – 3,184,943 (20.76%)
- Steve Forbes – 1,751,187 (11.41%)
- Lamar Alexander – 495,590 (3.23%)
- Alan Keyes – 471,716 (3.08%)
- Richard Lugar – 127,111 (0.83%)
- Unpledged delegates – 123,278 (0.80%)
- Phil Gramm – 71,456 (0.47%)
- Bob Dornan – 42,140 (0.28%)
- Morry Taylor – 21,180 (0.14%)
- Charles E. Collins – 2,092 (0.01%)
- Bill Clinton* – 1,972 (0.01%)
- Susan Ducey – 1,783 (0.01%)
- Ralph Nader* – 1,537 (0.01%)
- Isabell Masters – 1,052 (0.01%)
- Mary LeTulle – 940 (0.01%)
- Colin Powell* – 655 (0.00%)
- Billy Joe Clegg – 415 (0.00%)
- Richard P. Bosa – 216 (0.00%)
- Georgiana H. Doerschuck – 154 (0.00%)
- Pat Paulsen* – 144 (0.00%)
- Richard D. Skillen – 80 (0.00%)
- Paul Steven Jensen – 73 (0.00%)
- Jimmy McMillan – 70 (0.00%)
- Jack Kemp* – 62 (0.00%)
- Tim Kalemkarian – 59 (0.00%)
- William James Flanagan – 48 (0.00%)
- Charles Levens – 44 (0.00%)
- Russell J. Fornwalt – 37 (0.00%)
- Michael S. Levinson – 35 (0.00%)
- Jack Fellure – 34 (0.00%)
- John B. Hurd – 26 (0.00%)
- Gerald J. McManus – 20 (0.00%)
- Hubert David Patty – 17 (0.00%)
- Tennie Rogers – 12 (0.00%)
- Arlen Specter* – 10 (0.00%)
- Newt Gingrich* – 4 (0.00%)

(* – write-in)

Specter withdrew from the race before first primaries and endorsed Dole.

Republican primary for the 1998 United States Senate election in Pennsylvania:

- Arlen Specter (inc.) – 376,322 (67.21%)
- Larry G. Murphy – 101,120 (18.06%)
- Tom Lingenfelter – 82,168 (14.67%)
- Scattering – 328 (0.06%)

1998 United States Senate election in Pennsylvania:

- Arlen Specter (R) (inc.) – 1,814,180 (61.34%)
- Bill Lloyd (D) – 1,028,839 (34.79%)
- Dean L. Snyder (Constitution) – 68,377 (2.31%)
- Jack Iannantuono (Libertarian) – 46,103 (1.56%)

== 2000s ==
Republican primary for the 2004 United States Senate election in Pennsylvania:

- Arlen Specter (inc.) – 530,839 (50.82%)
- Pat Toomey – 513,693 (49.18%)

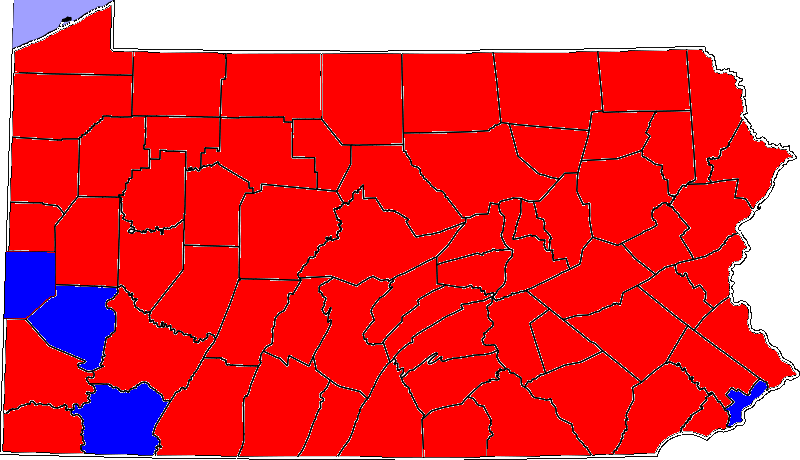
Results of 2004 election by counties

2004 United States Senate election in Pennsylvania:

- Arlen Specter (R) (inc.) – 2,925,080 (52.62%)
- Joe Hoeffel (D) – 2,334,126 (41.99%)
- James N. Clymer (Constitution) – 220,056 (3.96%)
- Elizabeth Summers (Libertarian) – 79,263 (1.43%)
- Scattering – 580 (0.01%)

== 2010s ==
Democratic primary for the 2010 United States Senate election in Pennsylvania

- Joe Sestak – 565,342 (53.9%)
- Arlen Specter (inc.) – 482,980 (46.1%)
