= Joseph Goulden =

Joseph Goulden may refer to:

- Joseph A. Goulden (1844–1915), American politician
- Joseph C. Goulden (born 1934), American writer
