= 1967 Philadelphia mayoral election =

- November 7, 1967
- Turnout: 73% ▼2 pp
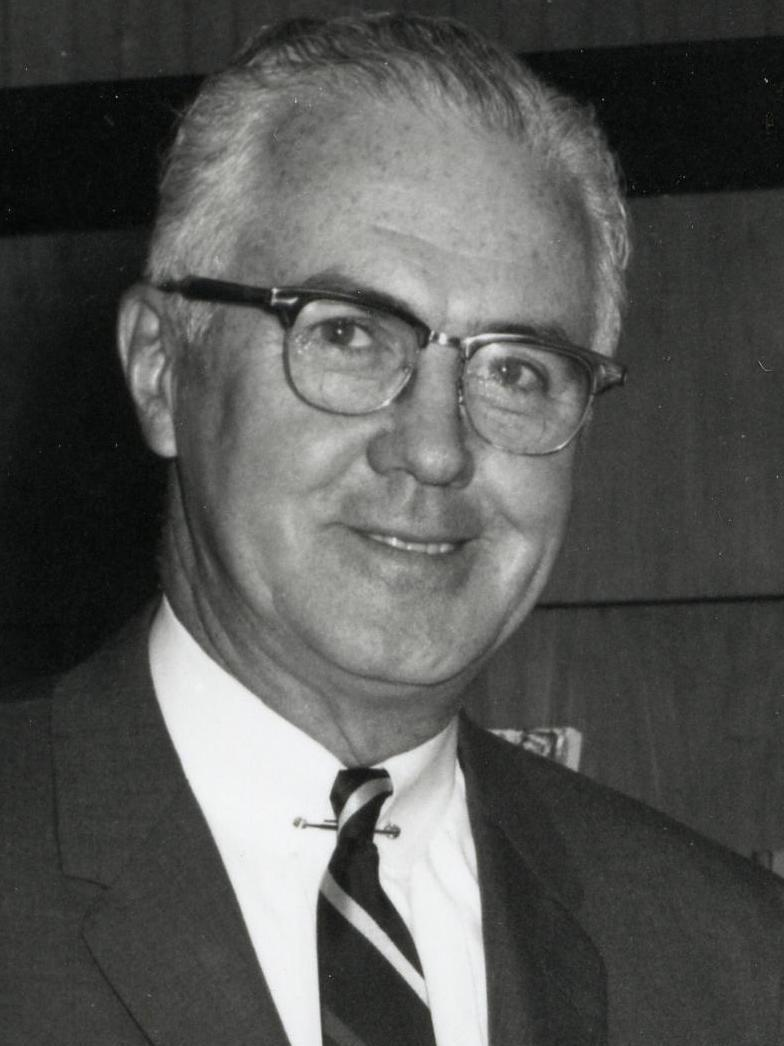

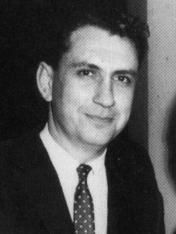
Nominee	James Tate	Arlen Specter
Party	Democratic	Republican
Popular vote	353,326	342,398
Percentage	48.98%	47.47%
- Results by ward Tate: 40–50% 50–60% 60–70% 70–80% Specter: 40–50% 50–60% 60–70%
Mayor before election
James Tate
Democratic
Elected mayor
James Tate
Democratic

The 1967 Philadelphia mayoral election was held on November 7, 1967. Incumbent mayor James Tate narrowly defeated Republican challenger Arlen Specter in the general election.

In the Democratic primary, Tate successfully fended off a challenge by Alexander Hemphill, who had the backing of Philadelphia Democratic Party chair Francis R. Smith.

Specter would later be elected to the U.S. Senate in 1980, where he served until 2011.

== Democratic primary ==
=== Candidates ===
- Alexander Hemphill, Philadelphia city controller
- Lenerte Roberts
- James Tate, incumbent mayor since 1962

=== Campaign ===
Philadelphia Democratic Party chair Francis R. Smith attempted to replace Tate on the ticket with City Controller Alexander Hemphill, but Tate refused to drop out of the election and defeated Hemphill in the Democratic primary.

=== Results ===
Philadelphia mayoral Democratic primary, 1967
Party	Candidate	Votes	%
Democratic	James Tate	152,949	63.79
Democratic	Alexander Hemphill	81,238	33.88
Democratic	Lenerte Roberts	5,566	2.32
Total votes		239,753	100.00

== Republican primary ==
Incumbent District Attorney of Philadelphia Arlen Specter won the Republican primary.

== General election ==
=== Candidates ===
- Joseph Frieri (Constitutional)
- Cecil B. Moore, attorney and civil rights activist (Political Freedom Rights)
- Leonard L. Smalls (Conservative)
- Arlen Specter, District Attorney of Philadelphia (Republican)
- James Tate, incumbent mayor since 1961 (Democratic)

=== Campaign ===
At the opening of the general election campaign, Specter was viewed as the frontrunner. Tate faced the challenge of reuniting the divided Democratic Party. Since Specter was a former liberal member of the Democratic Party, he received the backing of much of Philadelphia's political establishment, as well as many liberal Democrats, such as the group Americans for Democratic Action. Specter presented himself as being able to usher in a continuance of the liberal reform policies of Tate's immediate two predecessors, Richardson Dilworth and Joseph S. Clark Jr. Tate countered this by having Clark make appearances on the campaign trail with him.

Tate also benefited from the relative peace in the city during the "long, hot summer" of 1967, during which many other major American cities had been devastated by race riots and civil unrest. In an effort to emphasize a "law and order" message to secure reelection, Tate appointed Frank Rizzo as Philadelphia Police Commissioner. During the campaign, Tate was asked many times whether he planned to keep Rizzo in this position if reelected.

During the campaign, Tate received heavy media attention by being in Tel Aviv during the outbreak of the Six-Day War and being in Rome when Archbishop John Krol was elevated to Cardinal. Tate supported legislation endorsed by Krol which would allow state funding of parochial and other private schools, while Specter did not take a stance on the issue.

Polls anticipated a Specter victory.

=== Results ===
Tate won reelection by a narrow margin.

It is believed that Tate, the city's first Catholic mayor, received strong support from the Catholic electorate. He performed well in Catholic wards of the city. It is also believed that Tate benefited from strong turnout among labor voters. While Tate carried the city's African American wards, he received less support in these wards than was typical at the time for the Democratic Party.

Specter, who would have become the city's first Jewish mayor had he won, carried the city's wards with a primarily Jewish population. Specter won a majority of the white vote.

1967 Philadelphia mayoral election
Party	Candidate	Votes	%
Democratic	James Tate (incumbent)	353,326	48.98
Republican	Arlen Specter	342,398	47.47
Constitutional	Joseph J. Frieri	9,931	1.38
Political Freedom Rights	Cecil B. Moore	9,031	1.25
Conservative	Leonard L. Smalls	6,675	0.93
Turnout		721,361	100.00
