= James C. Crumlish Jr. =

American attorney and politician

Jim Crumlish

President Judge of the Commonwealth Court of Pennsylvania
- In office February 19, 1980 – February 19, 1990
- Preceded by: James Bowman
- Succeeded by: David Craig

Judge of the Commonwealth Court of Pennsylvania
- In office March 17, 1970 – March 17, 1992
- Preceded by: Court Created
- Succeeded by: Robert Byer

18th District Attorney of Philadelphia, Pennsylvania
- In office January 8, 1962 – January 3, 1966
- Preceded by: Victor Blanc
- Succeeded by: Arlen Specter

Personal details
- Born: May 5, 1920 Philadelphia, Pennsylvania
- Died: March 17, 1992 (aged 71) West Chester, Pennsylvania
- Party: Democratic
- Spouse: Rosemary
- Children: Sons: James C., III T. Sean; Daughters: Rosemary Lord Patricia Murphy Frances Keating
- Education: Georgetown University; University of Pennsylvania Law School
- Profession: Attorney, Politician

Military service
- Allegiance: United States
- Branch/service: Navy

James C. Crumlish Jr. (May 5, 1920 – March 17, 1992) was an American attorney and politician. He served as the District Attorney of Philadelphia, Pennsylvania between 1962 and 1966, and as a judge of the Commonwealth Court of Pennsylvania from 1970 until his death.

== Early life ==
He was born and raised in Philadelphia. His father, James Sr., was a judge of the Pennsylvania Court of Common Pleas and was a recognized figure within the city's Democratic Party hierarchy. Crumlish attended Georgetown University, and was in the process of earning his J.D. from the University of Pennsylvania School of Law when World War II broke out. He joined the Navy, and served as a senior line officer aboard the battleship USS Iowa. He took part in eight major battles and achieved the rank of lieutenant commander when he was 25 years old.

== Professional career ==
Crumlish returned to law school following the end of the war, and was admitted to the bar in 1949. He specialized in litigation while practicing general law, and in 1952, was appointed to the Philadelphia Registration Commission.

=== District attorney ===
Ten years after his appointment to the Registration Commission, he was appointed Philadelphia District Attorney. His appointment followed the ascension of incumbent District Attorney Victor Blanc to a judgeship. A political unknown, his appointment was attributed to his relationship with Fifth District Congressman and Philadelphia Democratic Party Chairman Bill Green Jr.

He was elected to the job in his own right in the 1961 election and developed a reputation as someone unafraid to take on judges, including his predecessor, Victor H. Blanc. Crumlish was, however, handily defeated for re-election in 1965 by future U.S. Senator Arlen Specter. Though at the time a registered Democrat, Specter ran as a Republican, and campaigned against the perceived corruption of the city's Democratic establishment.

=== Judicial career ===
After his defeat, Crumlish briefly returned to private practice, but became politically active again in 1968 as a representative for regional activities for Mayor James Tate. He ran for a judgeship in 1969 and lost, but was appointed in March 1970 to a seat on the newly created Commonwealth Court by Republican Governor Raymond P. Shafer.

Voters chose to retain him on the court in the 1977 and 1987 judicial retention elections. Crumlish was elected the court's President Judge in 1980, following the death of James S. Bowman, and retired from the position in 1990, per court regulations.

He served as a senior judge on the court from 1990 until his death.

== Personal life ==
Upon his death in 1992, which followed a brief illness, Crumlish was survived by his wife, Rosemary, two sons, three daughters, five brothers, a sister and 11 grandchildren.

Legal offices
Preceded by James Bowman	President Judge of the Commonwealth Court of Pennsylvania; 1980–1990	Succeeded by David Craig
Preceded by Court Created	Judge of the Commonwealth Court of Pennsylvania; 1970–1992	Succeeded by Robert Byer
Preceded by Victor Blanc	District Attorney of Philadelphia, Pennsylvania; 1962–1966	Succeeded by Arlen Specter
