= Ed Rendell =

Governor of Pennsylvania from 2003 to 2011

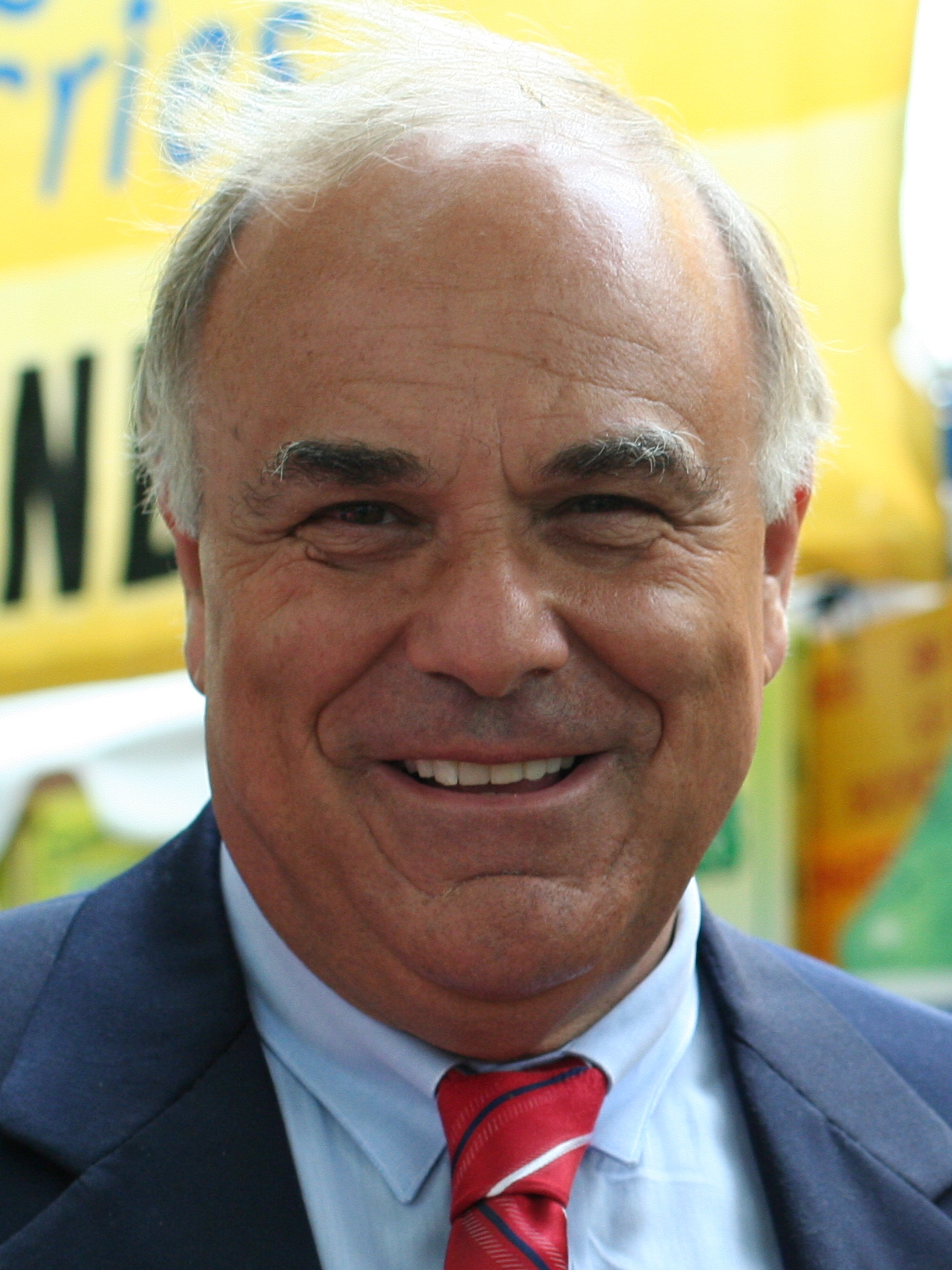
- Rendell in 2006

Chair of the National Governors Association
- In office July 14, 2008 – July 20, 2009
- Preceded by: Tim Pawlenty
- Succeeded by: Jim Douglas

45th Governor of Pennsylvania
- In office January 21, 2003 – January 18, 2011
- Lieutenant: Catherine Baker Knoll; Joe Scarnati
- Preceded by: Mark Schweiker
- Succeeded by: Tom Corbett

General Chair of the Democratic National Committee
- In office September 25, 1999 – February 3, 2001 Serving with Joe Andrew (National Chair)
- Preceded by: Roy Romer
- Succeeded by: Terry McAuliffe (Chair)

96th Mayor of Philadelphia
- In office January 6, 1992 – January 3, 2000
- Preceded by: Wilson Goode
- Succeeded by: John Street

21st District Attorney of Philadelphia
- In office January 2, 1978 – January 6, 1986
- Preceded by: Emmett Fitzpatrick
- Succeeded by: Ronald Castille

Personal details
- Born: Edward Gene Rendell; January 5, 1944 (age 82) New York City, New York, U.S.
- Party: Democratic
- Spouse: Marjorie Rendell (m. 1971; div. 2016)
- Children: 1
- Education: University of Pennsylvania (BA); Villanova University (JD)

Military service
- Branch/service: United States Army
- Years of service: 1968–1974
- Rank: Second Lieutenant
- Unit: United States Army Reserve

Edward Gene Rendell (/rɛnˈdɛl/; born January 5, 1944) is an American politician, author, and former prosecutor who served as the 45th governor of Pennsylvania from 2003 to 2011. He previously served as chair of the national Democratic Party from 1999 to 2001, as mayor of Philadelphia from 1992 to 2000, and as District Attorney of Philadelphia from 1978 to 1986.

Born in New York City to a Jewish family from Russia, Rendell moved to Philadelphia for college, completing his B.A. from the University of Pennsylvania and J.D. from Villanova University School of Law. He was elected District Attorney of Philadelphia for two terms from 1978 to 1986. He developed a reputation for being tough on crime, fueling a run for governor of Pennsylvania in 1986, which Rendell lost in the primary.

Elected mayor of Philadelphia in 1991, he inherited a $250 million deficit and the lowest credit rating of any major city in the country. As mayor, he balanced Philadelphia's budget and generated a budget surplus while cutting business and wage taxes and dramatically improving services to Philadelphia neighborhoods. The New York Times stated that Philadelphia under Rendell "has made one of the most stunning turnarounds in recent urban history." Nicknamed "America's Mayor" by Al Gore, Rendell served as chairman of the Democratic National Committee during the 2000 presidential election.

In 2002, Rendell was elected governor of Pennsylvania. He was a member of the Democratic Governors Association Executive Committee and served as the chairman of the National Governors Association. He was reelected in a landslide in 2006. He left office in 2011 due to term limits, and released a book, A Nation of Wusses: How America's Leaders Lost the Guts to Make Us Great, the following year. A Philadelphia Eagles fan, Rendell is also a football analyst on NBC Sports Philadelphia's Eagles Postgame Live, hosted by Michael Barkann.

== Early life ==
Ed Rendell was born on January 5, 1944, in New York City, the son of Emma (née Sloat) and Jesse T. Rendell. His parents were Jewish, and all four of his grandparents were immigrants from Russia. He attended Riverdale Country School before the University of Pennsylvania, where he joined the Pi Lambda Phi fraternity in 1962 and earned a B.A. degree in 1965. In 1968, he earned a J.D. at Villanova University School of Law. He served as a 2nd Lieutenant in the U.S. Army Reserve from 1968 to 1974.

== District attorney ==
Rendell was elected district attorney of Philadelphia in 1977, becoming the youngest DA in history, after he defeated the incumbent Democratic district attorney, Emmett Fitzpatrick, in the primary election. Rendell ran a campaign that emphasized that he was new to politics and so was not tainted by its corruption.

As district attorney, Rendell reportedly had a mean temper while doing his job. Once, he yelled in the governor's face for releasing a certain prisoner. It has been said that Rendell would even punch walls or throw furniture when he became upset. In 1980, Rendell received 28 delegate votes for vice president at the Democratic National Convention, although he was not a candidate. He served two terms as DA before leaving in 1986 to run for governor of Pennsylvania. He was defeated in the Democratic gubernatorial primary by Bob Casey Sr.

In 1982, during his second term, Rendell presided over the controversial prosecution of Mumia Abu-Jamal, resulting in a death sentence that was overturned in 2011. The 1985 bombing of the Black communal organization MOVE by the Philadelphia police also occurred during Rendell's tenure and killed 6 adults plus 5 children and caused a fire that left hundreds of neighbors homeless.

== Mayor of Philadelphia (1992–2000) ==
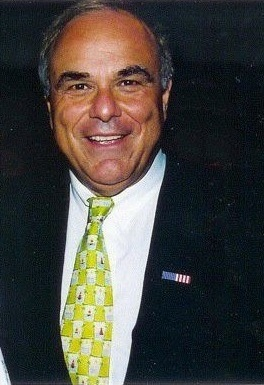
Rendell as mayor

In 1987, Rendell ran for the Democratic nomination against the incumbent mayor, Wilson Goode and lost. Rendell ran successfully four years later, in 1991. His opponent was to be Democrat-turned-Republican former Philadelphia Mayor, Frank Rizzo. Rizzo, however, died in the summer of 1991; in November 1991, Rendell won by more than a 2–1 margin against Joseph M. Egan, Jr., Rizzo's replacement on the Republican ticket.

As mayor, Rendell inherited massive fiscal problems. The state legislature established a fiscal oversight board to monitor the City of Philadelphia's fiscal issues. During his career as mayor, Rendell cut a $250 million deficit, balanced Philadelphia's budget and oversaw five consecutive years of budget surpluses, reduced business and wage taxes for four consecutive years, implemented new revenue-generating initiatives, and dramatically improved services to Philadelphia neighborhoods. He was given the nickname "Philadelphia's Renaissance or Revival" because of how well he did with the budget. He also appointed Philadelphia's first ever Latino deputy mayors, Benjamin Ramos and Manuel Ortiz. Rendell's cost-cutting policies brought him strong opposition from labor unions; however, he was re-elected in 1995, defeating Republican Joe Rocks with 80% of the vote.

Rendell's first term as mayor was chronicled in a best-selling book A Prayer for the City by journalist Buzz Bissinger. The author was given practically unlimited access to the mayor during that term. The New York Times called Rendell's job as mayor "the most stunning turnaround in recent urban history" due to his determination, inspiration, ambition, and his energy.

In 1996, Rendell signed an executive order, 2-96, which allowed same-sex couples of Philadelphia health benefits.

To date, Rendell is the last Philadelphia Mayor to not have previously served as member of Philadelphia City Council.

== 2002 gubernatorial campaign ==
When he announced his intent to seek the Democratic nomination for governor of Pennsylvania, he did so without the backing of the state party. The Pennsylvania Democratic Party threw their support behind Bob Casey Jr., son of recently deceased former Governor Bob Casey Sr., whom the party saw as a more electable candidate against the liberal Rendell. In a bitter primary, Rendell won the nomination by winning only 10 out of 67 counties: Philadelphia; its suburbs: Bucks, Chester, Montgomery, and Delaware; its exurbs: Berks, Lancaster, Lehigh, and Northampton; and Centre County, the home of Penn State University. In the November 2002 gubernatorial election, he defeated Republican State Attorney General Mike Fisher, garnering 53 percent of the vote to Fisher's 44 percent. Rendell won not only Philadelphia County, which is heavily Democratic, but also traditionally Republican suburbs of Philadelphia, largely due to his popularity as mayor of Philadelphia. These traditionally Republican voters who backed Rendell were called Rendellicans in other parts of the state and were a key part of the success of his campaign.

In a 2002 PoliticsPA feature story designating politicians with yearbook superlatives, he was named the "Most Likely to Succeed." His campaign website was described as having "cutting edge in design for a political site."

== Governor of Pennsylvania (2003–2011) ==
=== First term (2003–2007) ===
The first piece of legislation Rendell initiated was The Plan for a New Pennsylvania. The plan proposed using slot machine revenue to reduce taxes by $1 billion and included $687 million in increased education funding. The plan was to be paid for with a proposed income tax increase from 2.80 percent to 3.75 percent plus increased taxes on utilities and beer. The governor's plan passed but with a smaller tax increase to only 3.07 percent and increased education funding of $224 million. The final budget deal included additional taxes on cigarettes and utilities. Later that year, the Rendell administration passed a prescription drug plan that covered older Pennsylvanians. In his first year, Rendell created the Office of Management and Productivity with the goal of cutting $1 billion in administrative expenses by the end of his first term. One of the most widely touted successes from Rendell's productivity initiative was strategic sourcing in which he overhauled the Commonwealth's antiquated procurement system, leading to $180 million in annual savings and a quadrupling of Pennsylvania's minority- and women- owned business participation rate.

Rendell proposed that the 8 cents per gallon tax on beer be raised to 25 cents per gallon. Brewery D.G. Yuengling & Son spokesman, David Casinelli, was a critic of the tax. Casinelli expressed his view on the tax increase proposal by saying, "it seems like every time the state needs money, they come to alcohol or tobacco, and, frankly, it's not fair."

In 2004, Rendell persuaded the Pennsylvania General Assembly to pass measures to legalize and tax slot machine parlors, with the revenues from these measures to be used to reduce property taxes. Prior to this legislation, the only legal forms of gambling in Pennsylvania were horse racing and the state-run lottery. Rendell has been criticized by many opponents of legalized gambling.

In a compromise with the legislature, Rendell accepted a provision requiring that tax reductions only occur in areas where local school boards voted to accept the funding. Act 72 funding, as it came to be known, was accepted by only one fifth of Pennsylvania's school districts.

Following Act 72, Rendell and the Pennsylvania legislature looked at other proposals to reduce property taxes, a key component of his 2002 campaign. The governor said he was willing to consider legislation that changes Act 72, and legislative proposals were made to force school districts to accept the money. Other proposed legislation would have required the issue to be voted on in each district as a ballot question, rather than decided by school boards. Property tax relief and Act 72 were issues of great controversy and have been subject to political gridlock, and it was unclear when changes would be made.

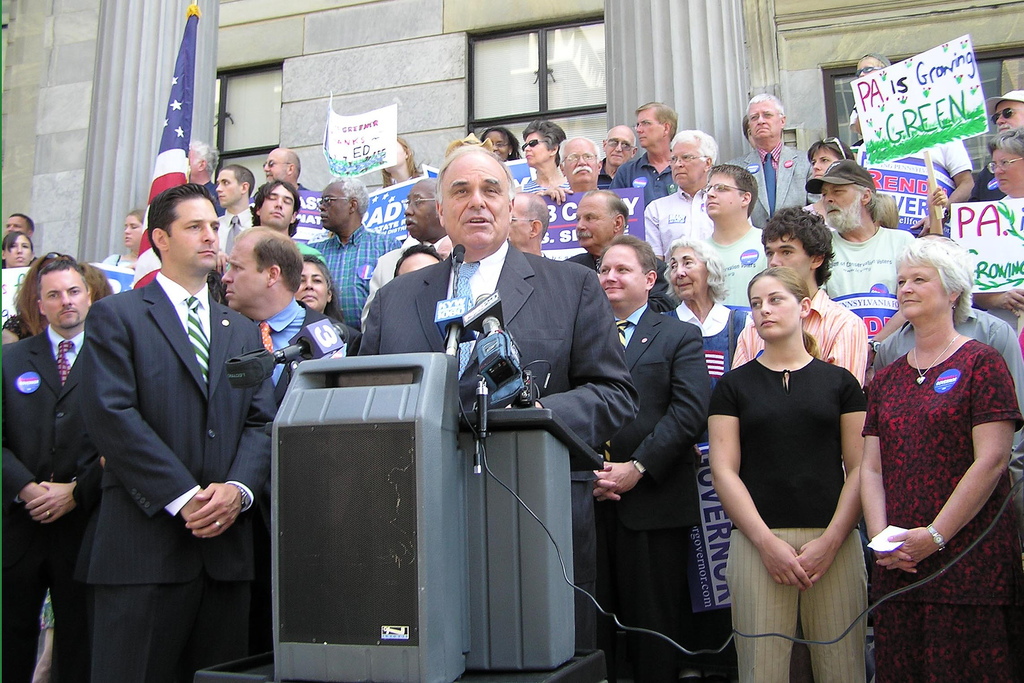
Rendell giving a speech in August 2006

In April 2004, Rendell confirmed reports that his state trooper chauffeurs regularly exceeded posted speed limits, and he claimed to be surprised to learn that they sometimes drove him at speeds in excess of 100 mph. He said that he initiated an investigation into the matter. Subsequently, in August 2004, the State Police announced a new policy that state troopers would no longer be allowed to exceed the speed limit, except in emergencies. However, in 2007, following news that Governor Corzine of New Jersey was in an accident in a state trooper-driven vehicle that was traveling in excess of 90 mph, Rendell was quoted as saying "I've told my troopers that I don't want them exceeding 80 unless they need to pass or unless there's some real exigent circumstance." At the time, the highest speed limit in Pennsylvania was 65 mph, and the current 70 mph limit was instituted in 2014 through legislation signed by Rendell's successor.

In early 2005, Rendell made statements that seemed to support President George W. Bush's Social Security privatization proposal. Rendell addressed this issue in later speeches, saying that he opposes social security privatization, and that his previous comments were meant to show admiration for President Bush for taking on a politically risky subject. Nevertheless, Rendell's initial statements cost him support among Democrats who are against Social Security privatization.

In the early morning hours of July 7, 2005, Ed Rendell signed a bill into law that increased pay for state lawmakers, judges, and top executive-branch officials. The vote took place at 2 am without public review or commentary. On November 16, 2005, Rendell signed a repeal of the pay raise after a near unanimous vote for repeal.

=== 2006 reelection campaign ===
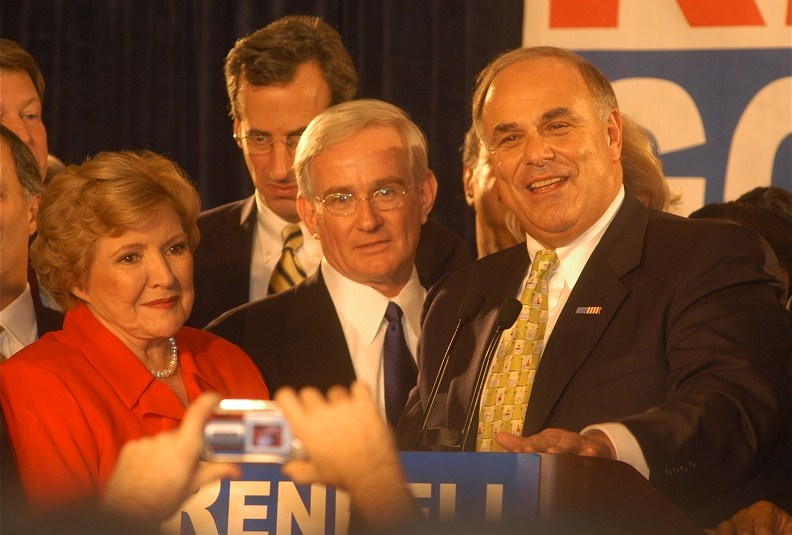
Rendell and lieutenant governor Knoll after their 2006 reelection win

Rendell won re-election on November 7, 2006, defeating Lynn Swann, a former professional football player for the Pittsburgh Steelers. by a vote of 2,470,517 (60%) to 1,622,135 (40%).

During his re-election campaign, Rendell was instrumental in the successful Senate candidacy of Bob Casey Jr. who had run against him for the Democratic nomination for governor in 2002.

=== Second term (2007–2011) ===
Rendell was sworn into his second term as governor of Pennsylvania on January 16, 2007. In 2007, as a residual effect of the potent political power the pay raise issue had in central and western Pennsylvania, Rendell stepped up criticism of the Pennsylvania Higher Education Assistance Agency (PHEAA) and its executive salaries and expenses, following published newspaper reports, in an effort to leverage PHEAA's profits from federal student loan revenues to help finance the Commonwealth's need-based state grant program for undergraduate post-secondary education (both for grants and for the administration of the program). PHEAA, however, was not directly under the control of the governor. The agency was created as an independent state agency in the 1960s by the Pennsylvania General Assembly to provide state funded scholarships. It eventually took on student loan servicing arrangements which generated non-public revenues which then were used, in part, to dramatically increase executive salaries. The PHEAA board is composed primarily of members of the Pennsylvania House of Representatives and Senate.

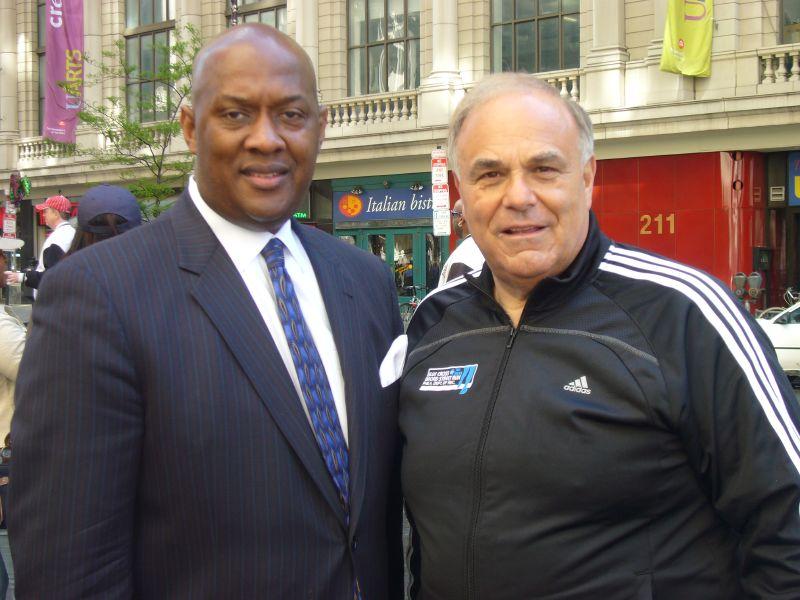
Rendell and Dwight Evans at the annual Broad Street Run

In July 2007, Rendell ordered a state government shutdown following a dispute with the state legislature over legislative initiatives related to the state budget. Approximately 25,000 state workers were furloughed. The shutdown was resolved within eight days.

A capital punishment supporter, Rendell signed 78 execution warrants during his term, but none of them were enforced due to stays.

In 2008, Rendell backed the effort to proceed with the Delaware River Deepening Project. The project was planned to have been carried out by the Delaware River Port Authority. The Delaware River Port Authority board from New Jersey decided that they no longer wanted to be associated with the project. Rendell then attempted to force New Jersey to back the project by exercising his Delaware River Port Authority board chairman power.

In December 2008, Rendell received criticism for stating that Arizona Governor Janet Napolitano was "perfect" for the role of Secretary of Homeland Security because, "...for that job, you have to have no life. Janet has no family. Perfect. She can devote, literally, 19, 20 hours a day to it."

Rendell drew some criticism following a late January 2009 preview of his budget proposal that would eliminate 100 budget line items, including programs such as the Pennsylvania Governor's Schools of Excellence and Drug Abuse Resistance Education ("D.A.R.E."). These program cuts are part of Rendell's proposal to cut state expenditures to a level 1 percent below the 2002-2003 budget in response to an expected 2.3 billion dollar budget shortfall. As a result of stress caused by the budget crisis, Rendell spokesman Chuck Ardo resigned.

Rendell called for reinstating the Federal Assault Weapons Ban in the wake of a shootout in Pittsburgh.

Although adding tolls to Interstate highways was not an element of his 2006 re-election campaign, Rendell introduced a plan in 2007, following his re-election, to add tolls to Route 80, which crosses the entire state from New Jersey to Ohio. This resulted in a complicated, multi-year battle fought at both the state and Federal level. The Federal Highway Administration rejected the plan for tolls on Route 80 in 2007, again in 2008, and again for the final time in 2010. Although the decision was made by an agency of the Executive branch, a bi-partisan group of Pennsylvania's members of the U.S. House of Representatives were on the record against tolling Route 80.

=== Involvement in presidential elections ===
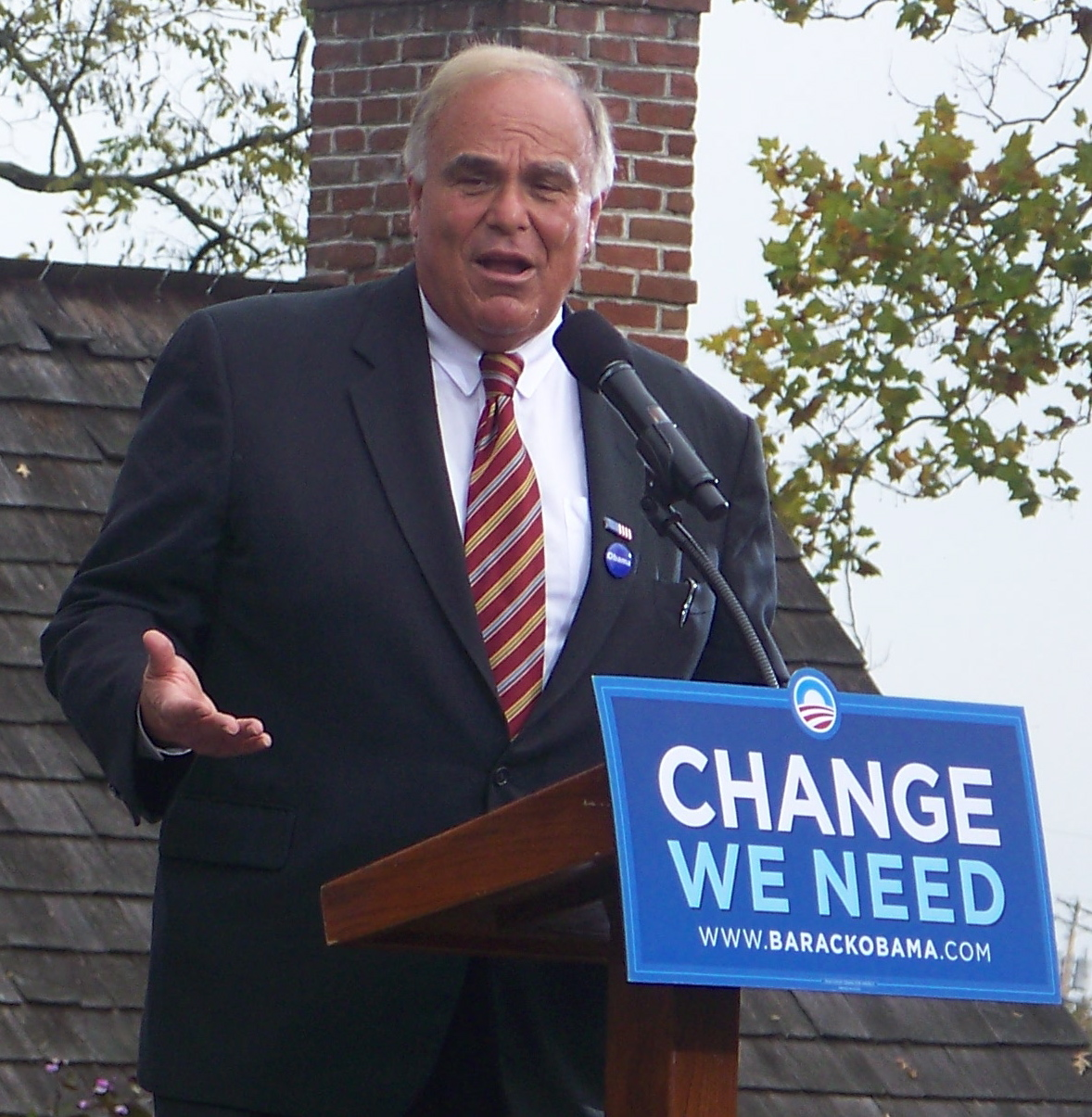
Rendell speaking in support of Barack Obama in Horsham, Pennsylvania, on October 13, 2008

Rendell was a potential candidate to serve as Senator John Kerry's running mate in the 2004 presidential campaign.

Rendell's popularity, particularly in the suburban ring of counties around Philadelphia, was a key to Kerry's victory in Pennsylvania, one of the most hotly contested swing states in the 2004 presidential election.

On January 24, 2008, Rendell announced his endorsement of Hillary Clinton in her race for the Democratic presidential nomination. He stated that "[Hillary] really cares about moving this country forward. She also has the best health-care plan for America."

As one of Hillary Clinton's staunchest supporters, Rendell argued that many media outlets' coverage of her campaign were biased. On March 31, 2008, he congratulated Fox News on what he considered to be the best campaign coverage. Addressing Fox & Friends host Steve Doocy, Rendell said, "I think during this entire primary coverage, starting in Iowa and up to the present, Fox has done the fairest job, has remained the most objective of all the cable networks ... You actually have done a very balanced job of reporting the news, and some of the other stations are just caught up with Senator Obama, who is a great guy, but Senator Obama can do no wrong, and Senator Clinton can do no right."

Rendell reached out to various Pennsylvania mayors in order to get them to speak out in support of Clinton. He assisted her with establishing her messages. Some superdelegates maintained a neutral stance prior to the Pennsylvania primary as a result of Rendell talking them into remaining neutral until the Pennsylvania primary was over. Clinton also benefited from televised endorsement ads Rendell made on her behalf.

After Clinton dropped out of the race, Rendell endorsed Senator Barack Obama in June 2008 and made several campaign appearances on his behalf.

As state governor, Rendell was one of the 768 superdelegates to the Democratic National Convention.

== Post-gubernatorial career ==
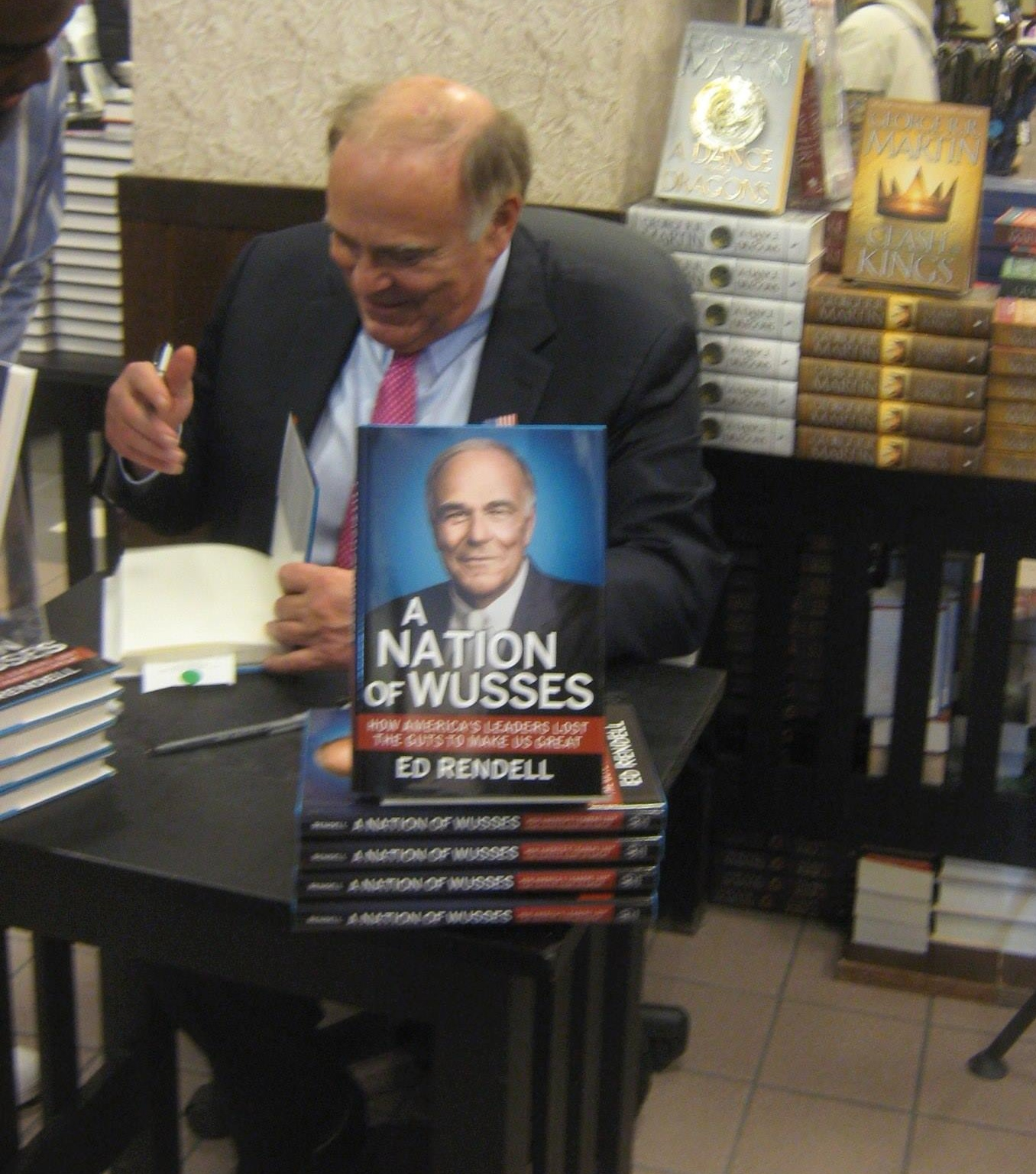
Rendell signing his book in 2012

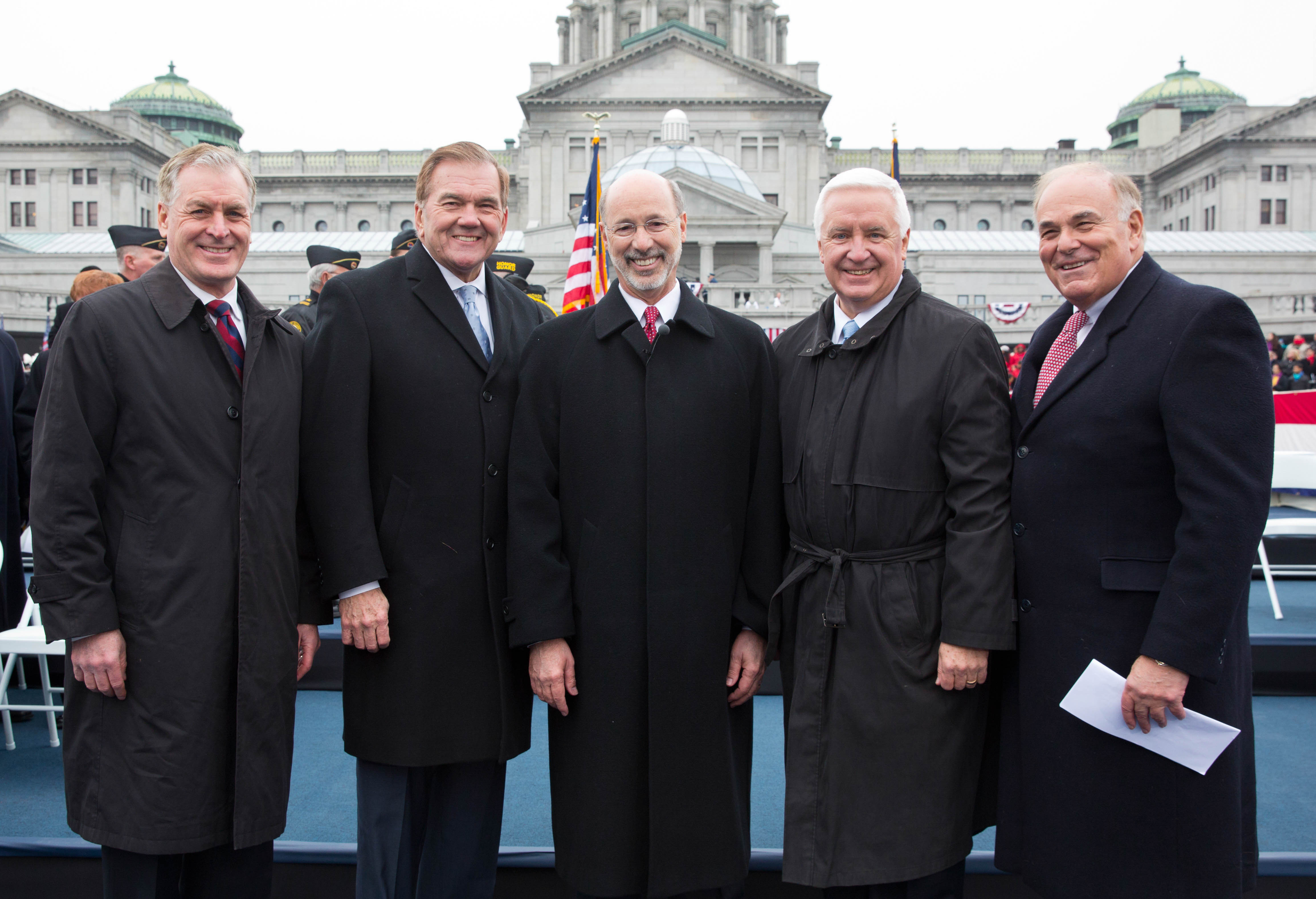
Rendell with Governors Tom Corbett, Tom Wolf, Tom Ridge, and Mark Schweiker in 2015

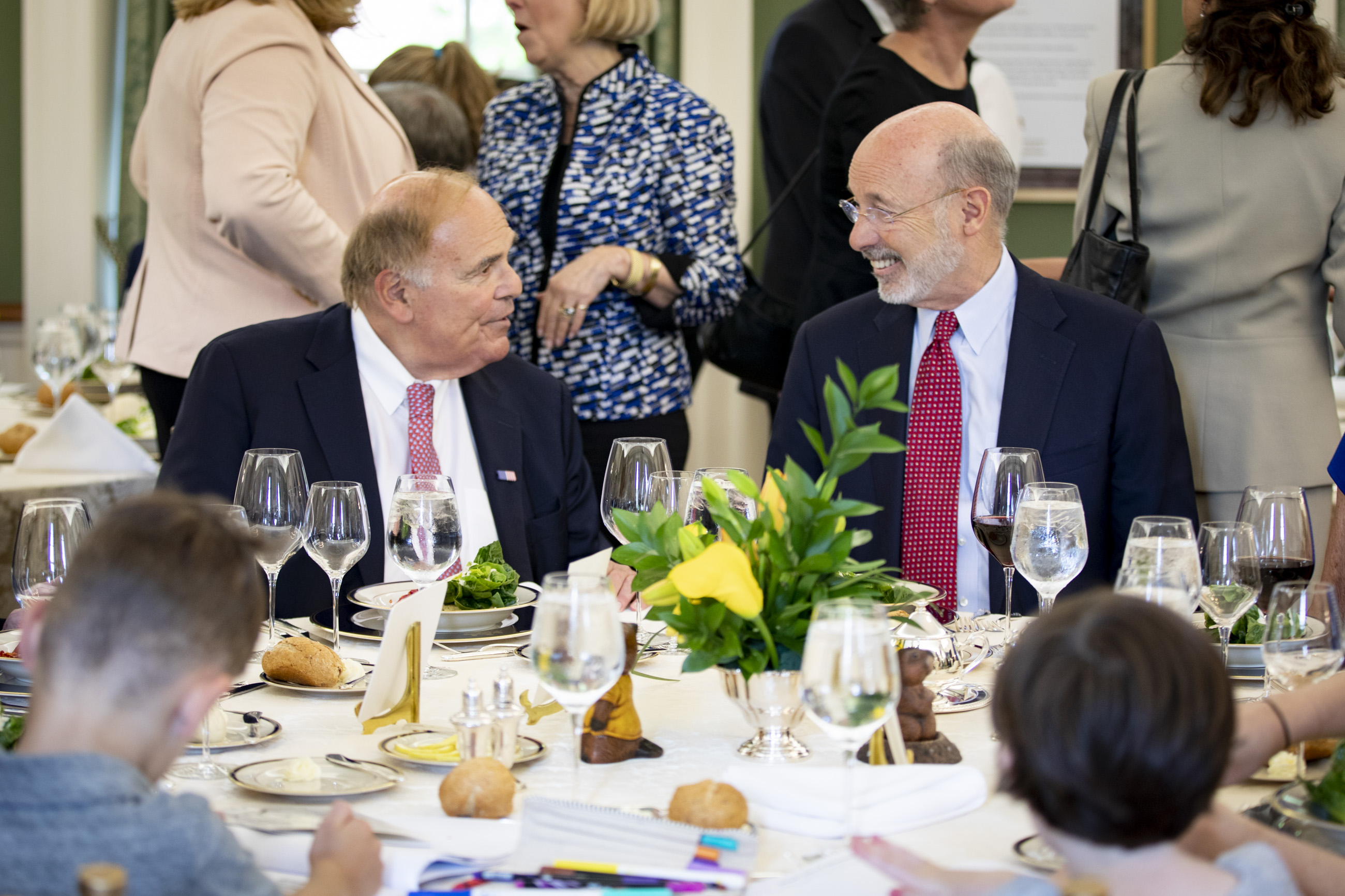
Rendell and Governor Tom Wolf in 2019

Rendell was term-limited for the election of 2010. He was succeeded by Republican Tom Corbett on January 18, 2011. Following the end of his career as governor of Pennsylvania, Rendell returned to his former law firm, the Philadelphia-based Ballard Spahr.

In January 2011, he accepted a position as an on-air political analyst for NBC News and MSNBC, and the following month took a position as senior advisor at boutique investment bank Greenhill & Co.

In April 2011, Rendell joined Element Partners, a Philadelphia-based cleantech investment firm, as an Operating Partner.

Also in 2011, Rendell reportedly acted as a go-between for Range Resources Corp, an oil and gas exploration and production company, and then United States EPA Administrator Lisa P. Jackson, regarding a Texas water contamination case; and has been a vocal proponent of shale gas extraction as part of a United States energy strategy. Rendell is a faculty member of the Fels Institute of Government at the University of Pennsylvania, and chair of Team Pennsylvania Foundation.

In 2016, Rendell admitted that during his term as Governor of Pennsylvania, he underperformed when he dealt with the growing popularity of shale gas in Pennsylvania. Rendell stated, "I made a mistake in the rush to get the economic part of fracking delivered to Pennsylvania" saying that he should have been more concerned with the effect shale gas has on Pennsylvania's environment and not with how Pennsylvania could benefit financially from shale gas.

== Personal life ==
His former wife, Marjorie Rendell, is a Federal judge for the United States Court of Appeals for the Third Circuit who was appointed by President Bill Clinton. They married on July 10, 1971, and have one son, Jesse.

Ed and Marjorie Rendell announced their separation shortly after he left office in 2011. They filed for divorce in September 2016.

Rendell acknowledged that he has dealt with Parkinson's disease for over three years in a press conference at the University of Pennsylvania hospital in June 2018.

He also has had a few movie cameos. During his tenure as Mayor of Philadelphia, he appeared in the 1993 film Philadelphia as himself. He also played the Philadelphia Mayor in the 2015 film The Benefactor and the 2019 film In the Shadow of the Moon (Although out of office in real life this time for both of these movies).

=== Sports fan ===
Rendell is a Philadelphia Eagles fan and part of the panel on the NBC Sports Philadelphia show Eagles Postgame Live, which airs after every Eagles regular and post-season game. Rendell was among the crowd in attendance for the Philadelphia Eagles Santa Claus incident in 1968 and the Bounty Bowl II in 1989. Rendell wagered (and lost) $20 expecting that a fellow fan could not throw a snowball from the stands to the field. He even made a friendly wager on the outcome of Super Bowl XXXIX, promising to wear a New England Patriots jersey and sing the national anthem at a Philadelphia 76ers/Boston Celtics game if the Eagles lost, which they did.

He would lose similar friendly wagers with the Governor of New York, David Paterson, in supporting the Philadelphia Phillies on their quest to defend their 2008 championship against the New York Yankees in 2009 and again with Governor of Illinois, Pat Quinn, in supporting the Philadelphia Flyers in the quest to win the 2010 Stanley Cup Finals against the Chicago Blackhawks. In 2006, he won a bet with the Governor of Washington, Christine Gregoire in supporting the Pittsburgh Steelers in their quest to win Super Bowl XL over the Seattle Seahawks 21–10.

As a graduate of the University of Pennsylvania, Rendell frequently supports the Penn basketball team and can be seen at games at the Palestra. He has also assisted in finding new corporate sponsorship for Philadelphia International Championship, a 21-year-old Philadelphia bicycle race.

Also a Philadelphia Phillies fan, he spoke at a memorial service for Hall of Fame announcer Harry Kalas at Citizens Bank Park in Philadelphia on April 18, 2009.

On December 26, 2010, the Philadelphia Eagles home game against the visiting Minnesota Vikings was postponed before any snow had fallen due to an impending blizzard in Philadelphia. Rendell said of the postponement, "My biggest beef is that this is part of what's happened in this country. We've become a nation of wusses. The Chinese are kicking our butt in everything. If this was in China do you think the Chinese would have called off the game? People would have been marching down to the stadium, they would have walked and they would have been doing calculus on the way down." As a result, the grounds crew piled snow on his reserved seat the following game, and topped it with a sign that said "This seat reserved for non-wussies".

== Gubernatorial electoral history ==
Pennsylvania gubernatorial election, 2002
Party	Candidate	Votes	%
Democratic	Ed Rendell	1,913,235	53.40
Republican	Mike Fisher	1,589,408	44.40
Libertarian	Ken V. Krawchuk	40,923	1.14
Green	Mike Morrill	38,423	1.07
Total votes		3,581,989	100.00
Democratic gain from Republican			

Pennsylvania gubernatorial election, 2006
Party	Candidate	Votes	%
Democratic	Ed Rendell (incumbent)	2,470,517	60.33
Republican	Lynn Swann	1,622,135	39.61
Write-in		2,670	0.06
Total votes		4,095,322	100.00
Turnout			50.05
Democratic hold			

== See also ==
- Pennsylvania Film Production Tax Credit

Legal offices
Preceded by Emmett Fitzpatrick	District Attorney of Philadelphia; 1978–1986	Succeeded by Ronald Castille
Political offices
Preceded by Wilson Goode	Mayor of Philadelphia; 1992–1999	Succeeded by John Street
Preceded by Mark Schweiker	Governor of Pennsylvania; 2003–2011	Succeeded by Tom Corbett
Preceded by Tim Pawlenty	Chair of the National Governors Association; 2008–2009	Succeeded by Jim Douglas
Party political offices
Preceded by Roy Romer	General Chair of the Democratic National Committee; 1999–2001; Served alongside: Joe Andrew (National Chair)	Succeeded by Terry McAuliffe as Chair of the Democratic National Committee
Preceded by Ivan Itkin	Democratic nominee for Governor of Pennsylvania; 2002, 2006	Succeeded by Dan Onorato
U.S. order of precedence (ceremonial)
Preceded by Mark Schweiker as Former Governor	Order of precedence of the United States	Succeeded by Tom Corbett as Former Governor
