= 1986 United States Senate election in Pennsylvania =

- November 4, 1986
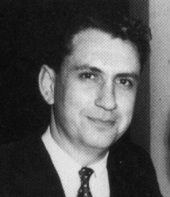

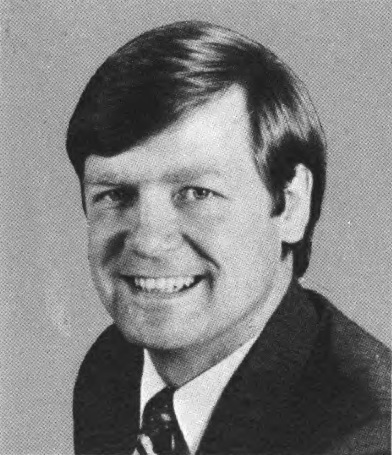
Nominee	Arlen Specter	Bob Edgar
Party	Republican	Democratic
Popular vote	1,906,537	1,448,219
Percentage	56.44%	42.87%
- County results Specter: 50–60% 60–70% 70–80% Edgar: 40–50% 50–60%
U.S. senator before election
Arlen Specter
Republican
Elected U.S. Senator
Arlen Specter
Republican

The 1986 United States Senate election in Pennsylvania was held on November 4, 1986. Incumbent Republican U.S. Senator Arlen Specter won re-election to a second term.

As of 2024, this is the most recent time that the state voted for different parties for Senate and Governor in the same election.

== Republican primary ==
=== Candidates ===
- Arlen Specter, incumbent U.S. Senator since 1981
- Richard A. Stokes, high school social studies teacher

=== Results ===
Specter defeated Stokes by a 3-to-1 margin.

== Democratic primary ==
=== Candidates ===
- Donald A. Bailey, Pennsylvania State Auditor
- Robert W. Edgar, U.S. Representative from Broomall
- George H.R. Elder, Lyndon LaRouche supporter
- Cyril E. Sagan, Slippery Rock State University professor

=== Results ===
Edgar narrowly defeated Bailey with Elder and Sagan each receiving less than six percent.

== General election ==
=== Candidates ===
- Bob Edgar, U.S. Representative from Broomall (Democratic)
- Lance S. Haver (Consumer)
- Arlen Specter, incumbent U.S. Senator since 1981 (Republican)

=== Campaign ===
Despite the popularity of his Republican counterpart John Heinz, Arlen Specter was viewed somewhat tepidly by the Pennsylvania electorate entering the race, although both men shared similar moderate profiles. Additionally, economic woes had dragged down the popularity of Republican candidates in the industrial states. Democrats sensed the vulnerability of the incumbent, and two men with similar experience in the U.S. House, but contrasting political views, vied for the nomination. Don Bailey, the state's incumbent Auditor General, projected a strong blue-collar image and had moderate positions that were often relatively close to Specter's. Bob Edgar, a Methodist minister and sitting Congressman, had more liberal viewpoints, as he was connected with the Vietnam War-era peace movement and the anti-corruption movement following the Watergate scandals. However, issues played a very minor role in the primary, which instead showcased the state's geographical divide, with Delaware County-based Edgar narrowly defeating Westmoreland County-based Bailey.

True to his past as a political organizer, Edgar developed a strong grassroots campaign and reached out to alienated left-leaning voters. He attacked Specter as a politician who compromised his moderate political positions when pressured by the conservative administration of Ronald Reagan. Edgar, who had a history of winning tight races in a traditionally Rockefeller Republican congressional district, was a financial underdog, as Specter was able to raise nearly three times as much for his campaign warchest. Originally attempting a positive campaign, Specter changed his strategy in response to Edgar's personal attacks and characterized Edgar as soft on defense issues and as a liberal ideologue. Edgar was never able to find a message that resonated with voters in the western portion of the state, and Specter undercut Edgar's support in his suburban Philadelphia heartland by presenting himself as representative of the views of the average suburban voter.

=== Results ===
General election results
Party	Candidate	Votes	%
Republican	Arlen Specter (incumbent)	1,906,537	56.44%
Democratic	Robert W. Edgar	1,448,219	42.87%
Citizens	Lance S. Haver	23,470	0.69%
Republican hold			

== See also ==
- 1986 United States Senate elections
