= Arlen Specter =

American lawyer and politician (1930–2012)

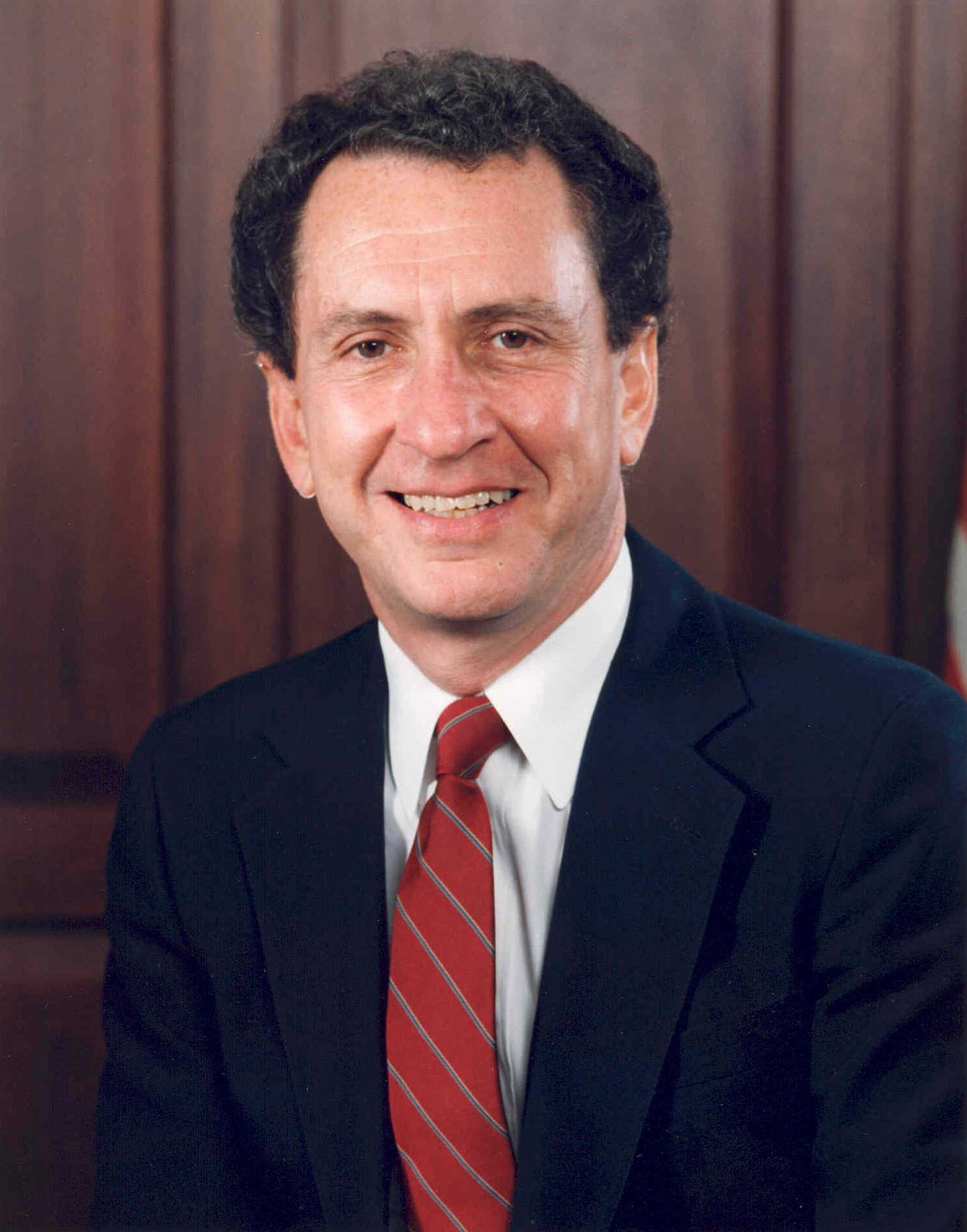
- Official portrait, c. 1993

United States Senator from Pennsylvania
- In office January 3, 1981 – January 3, 2011
- Preceded by: Richard Schweiker
- Succeeded by: Pat Toomey
Senate positions
Chair of the Senate Judiciary Committee
In office January 3, 2005 – January 3, 2007
Preceded by	Orrin Hatch
Succeeded by	Patrick Leahy
Chair of the Senate Veterans' Affairs Committee
In office January 3, 2003 – January 3, 2005
Preceded by	Jay Rockefeller
Succeeded by	Larry Craig
In office January 3, 1997 – June 6, 2001
Preceded by	Alan K. Simpson
Succeeded by	Jay Rockefeller
Chair of the Senate Intelligence Committee
In office January 3, 1995 – January 3, 1997
Preceded by	Dennis DeConcini
Succeeded by	Richard Shelby

19th District Attorney of Philadelphia
- In office January 3, 1966 – January 7, 1974
- Preceded by: James C. Crumlish Jr.
- Succeeded by: F. Emmett Fitzpatrick

Personal details
- Born: February 12, 1930 Wichita, Kansas, U.S.
- Died: October 14, 2012 (aged 82) Philadelphia, Pennsylvania, U.S.
- Party: Democratic (1951–1965, 2009–2012); Republican (1965–2009)
- Spouse: Joan Levy (m. 1953)
- Children: 2
- Education: University of Oklahoma (attended); University of Pennsylvania (BA); Yale University (LLB)
- Nickname: Snarlin' Arlen

Military service
- Branch/service: United States Air Force
- Years of service: 1951–1953
- Rank: First lieutenant
- Arlen Specter's voice Specter opens a Senate Judiciary Committee hearing on oversight of the DOJ Civil Rights Division; Recorded November 16, 2006

Arlen Specter (February 12, 1930 – October 14, 2012) was an American lawyer, author, and politician who served as a United States senator from Pennsylvania from 1981 to 2011. Specter was a Democrat from 1951 to 1965, then a Republican from 1965 until 2009, when he switched back to the Democratic Party. First elected in 1980, he was the longest-serving senator from Pennsylvania, having represented the state for 30 years.

Specter was born in Wichita, Kansas, to Jewish parents who were Russian or Ukrainian immigrants. He graduated from the University of Pennsylvania and served with the United States Air Force during the Korean War. Specter later graduated from Yale Law School and opened a law firm with Marvin Katz, who would later become a federal judge. Specter served as assistant counsel for the Warren Commission investigating the assassination of John F. Kennedy and helped formulate the "single-bullet theory". In 1965, Specter was elected District Attorney of Philadelphia, a position that he held until 1973.

During his 30-year Senate career, Specter staked out a spot in the political center. He served as Chair of the Senate Judiciary Committee from 2005 to 2007. In 2006, Specter was selected by Time as one of America's Ten Best Senators. Specter lost his 2010 re-election bid in the Democratic primary to former U.S. Navy vice admiral Joe Sestak, who then lost to Republican Pat Toomey in the general election. Toomey succeeded Specter on January 3, 2011.

In 1993, Specter underwent a surgery to remove a brain tumor. In early 2005 he was diagnosed with Hodgkin's lymphoma, but continued his work in the Senate while undergoing chemotherapy. He died from complications of non-Hodgkin's lymphoma on October 14, 2012.

== Early life and education ==
Specter was born in Wichita, Kansas, the youngest child of Lillie (née Shanin) and Harry Specter, who grew up in the Bachkuryne village of Cherkasy Oblast, Ukraine. Specter was Jewish, and wrote in his memoir, Passion for Truth, that his father's family was the only Jewish family in the village. The family lived at 940 South Emporia Street in Wichita before moving to Russell, Kansas, where he graduated from Russell High School in 1947. Russell is also the hometown of fellow politician Bob Dole (who graduated from Russell High School in 1941). Specter said that his father weighed items from his junkyard on a scale owned by Dole's father Doran Dole (who owned a granary). He said his brother Morton and Dole's brother Kenny were contemporaries and friends.

Specter's father served in the U.S. infantry during World War I, and was badly wounded. During the Great Depression, Specter's father was a fruit peddler, a tailor, and a junkyard owner. After graduating from Russell High School, Arlen Specter studied first at the University of Oklahoma. He transferred to the University of Pennsylvania, majored in international relations, and graduated Phi Beta Kappa in 1951. While at Penn, Specter was a member of the Pi Lambda Phi fraternity. Specter said the family moved to Philadelphia when his sister Shirley was of a marriageable age because there were no other Jews in Russell.

=== Military career ===
During the Korean War, Specter served stateside in the United States Air Force from 1951 to 1953 and obtained the rank of first lieutenant as an officer in the Air Force Office of Special Investigations.

=== Early legal career and personal life ===
In 1953, he married Joan Levy. In 1979, she was elected to one of the two allotted minority party at-large seats on the Philadelphia City Council. She held the seat for four terms, until she was defeated for re-election in 1995 by Frank Rizzo Jr. The couple had two sons. Specter graduated from Yale Law School in 1956, while serving as editor of the Yale Law Journal. Afterward, Specter opened a law practice, Specter & Katz, with Marvin Katz, who served as a Federal District Court Judge in Philadelphia, until his death in October 2010. Specter represented Ira Einhorn, known as "The Unicorn Killer," aiding him to get a very low bail for a murder charge (which Einhorn subsequently jumped). Specter became an assistant district attorney under District Attorney James C. Crumlish Jr., and was a member of the Democratic Party.

== Early political career ==
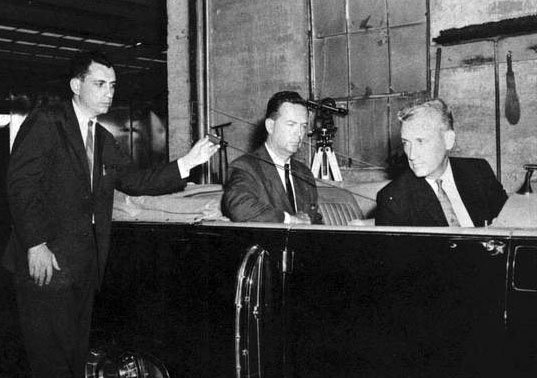
Specter reproducing the assumed alignment of the single bullet theory. The subsequent revelation that Texas Governor John Connally's seat in the Presidential limousine had been elevated with respect to John Kennedy's corroborated this theory.

=== Involvement with the Warren Commission ===
Specter worked for the Warren Commission, which investigated the assassination of John F. Kennedy, at the recommendation of Representative Gerald Ford, who was then one of the Commissioners. As an assistant for the commission, he co-wrote the proposal of the "single bullet theory", which suggested the non-fatal wounds to Kennedy and wounds to Texas Governor John Connally were caused by the same bullet. This was a crucial assertion for the Warren Commission, since if the two had been wounded by separate bullets within such a short time frame, that would have demonstrated the presence of a second assassin and therefore a conspiracy. The United States House Select Committee on Assassinations published their report in 1979 stating that their "forensic pathology panel's conclusions were consistent with the so-called single bullet theory advanced by the Warren Commission".

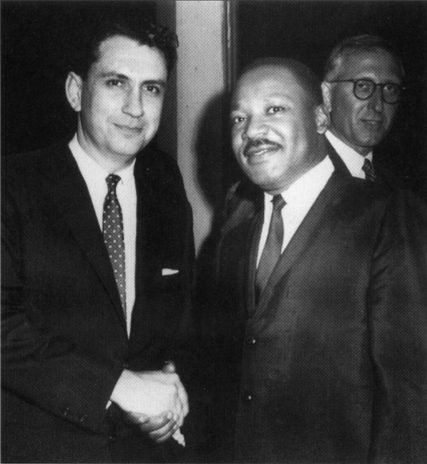
Specter with Martin Luther King Jr.

=== Initial electoral campaigns ===
In 1965, Specter ran for Philadelphia district attorney against his former boss, incumbent James C. Crumlish Jr. However, the city's Democratic leaders, such as Peter Camiel, did not want Specter as their candidate, so he switched parties and ran as a Republican, prompting Crumlish to call him "Benedict Arlen". Specter defeated Crumlish by 36,000 votes. Although he was a supporter of capital punishment, as a prosecutor he questioned the fairness of the Pennsylvania death penalty statute in 1972.

In 1967 he was the Republican Party standard bearer, together with City Controller candidate, Tom Gola, in the Philadelphia mayoral campaign against the Democratic incumbent James Tate. Two of their slogans were, "We need THESE guys to watch THOSE guys" and "They're younger, they're tougher, and nobody owns them!" He served two four-year terms as district attorney for the city of Philadelphia, but was handily defeated in his bid for a third term in 1973 by noted criminal defense attorney F. Emmett Fitzpatrick.

In 1976, Specter ran in the Republican primary for the U.S. Senate and was defeated by John Heinz. In 1978, he was defeated in the primary for Governor of Pennsylvania by Dick Thornburgh. After several years in private practice with the Philadelphia law firm Dechert, Price & Rhoads, Specter ran again for the U.S. Senate in 1980. This time, he won, and assumed office in January 1981.

== U.S. Senate (1981–2011) ==
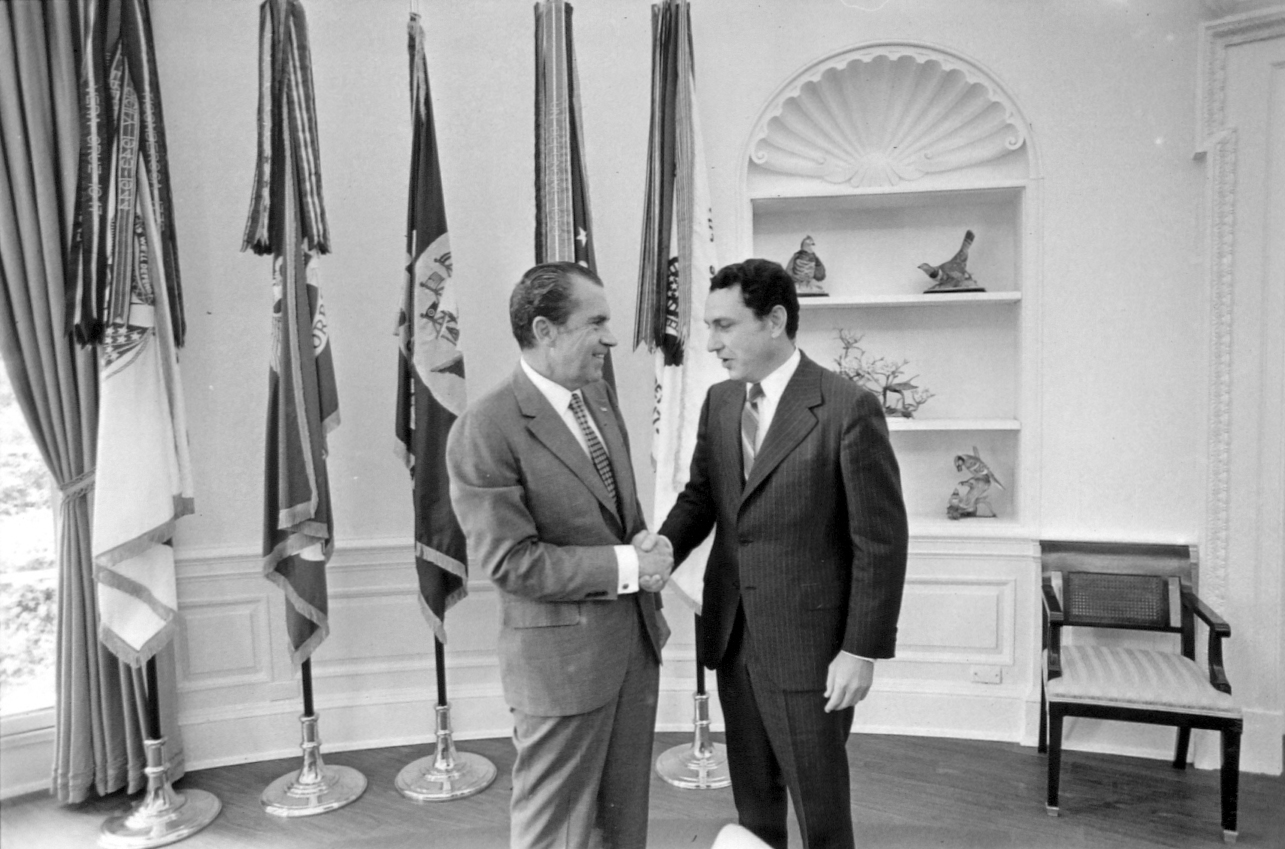
Specter greeting President Richard Nixon in 1971

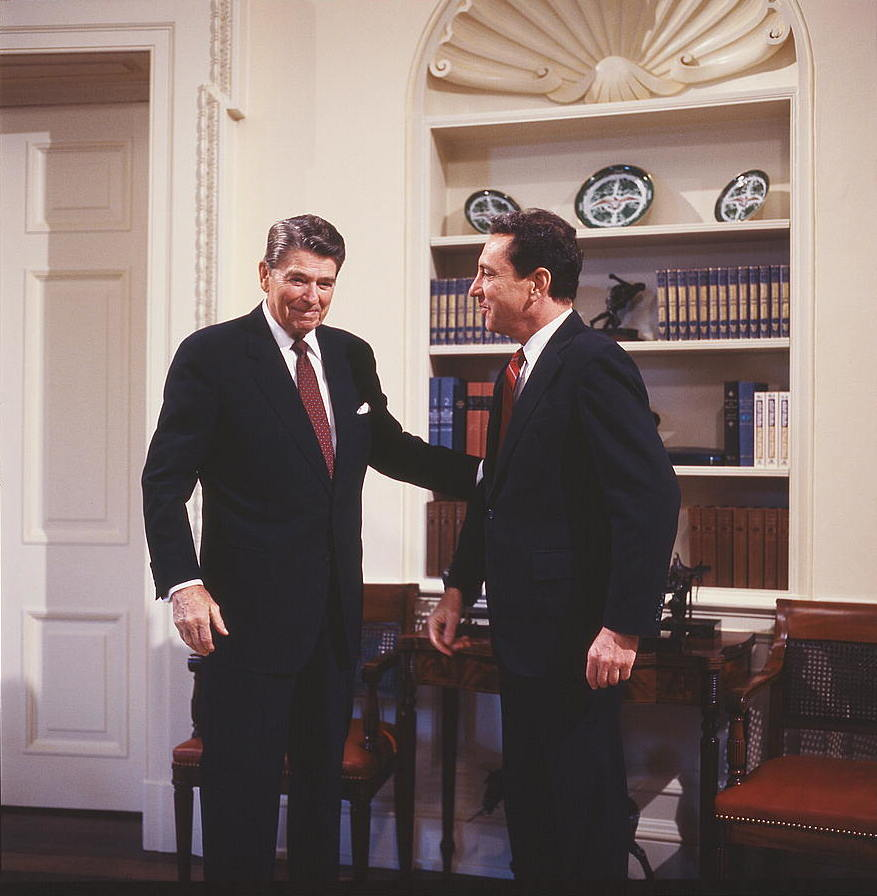
Specter with President Ronald Reagan in 1986

In 1988, Specter co-sponsored an amendment to the Fair Housing Act of 1968, which prohibited discrimination in the rental, sale, marketing, and financing of the nation's housing. The amendment strengthened the ability of the Office of Fair Housing and Equal Opportunity to enforce the Fair Housing Act and expanded the protected classes to include disabled persons and families with children.

In 1998 and 1999, Specter criticized the Republican Party for the impeachment of President Bill Clinton. Believing that Clinton had not received a fair trial, Specter cited Scots law to render a verdict of "not proven" on Clinton's impeachment. However, his verdict was recorded as "not guilty" in the Senate records.

In October 1999, Specter was one of four Senate Republicans to vote in favor of the Comprehensive Test Ban Treaty. The treaty was designed to ban underground nuclear testing and was the first major international security pact to be defeated in the Senate since the Treaty of Versailles.

On October 11, 2002, Specter voted in favor of H.J.Res.114 authorizing the Iraq War. In a 2002 PoliticsPA Feature story designating politicians with yearbook superlatives, he was named the "Toughest to Work For". In 2003, the Pennsylvania Report, a subscription-based political newsletter, described Specter as one of the "vanishing breed of Republican moderates", and described his political stance as "'Pennsylvania first' middle of-the-road politics", even though he was known as an "avid Republican partisan".

Soon after the 2004 election, Specter stepped into the public spotlight as a result of controversial statements about his views of the future of the Supreme Court. At a press conference, he stated:

When you talk about judges who would change the right of a woman to choose, overturn Roe v. Wade, I think [confirmation] is unlikely. The president is well aware of what happened, when a number of his nominees were sent up, with the filibuster.... And I would expect the president to be mindful of the considerations which I am mentioning.

Activist groups interpreted his comments as warnings to President George W. Bush about the implications of nominating Supreme Court justices who were opposed to the Roe v. Wade decision. Specter maintained that his comments were a prediction, not a warning. He met with many conservative Republican senators, and based on assurances he gave them, he was recommended for the Judiciary Committee's chairmanship in late 2004. He officially assumed that position when the 109th Congress convened on January 4, 2005.

On March 9, 2006, a revision of the USA PATRIOT Act was signed into law. It amended the process for interim appointments of U.S. Attorneys, a clause Specter wrote during his chairmanship of the Senate Judiciary Committee. The change allowed the Bush Administration to appoint interim U.S. attorneys without term limits, and without confirmation by the Senate. The Bush administration used the law to place at least eight interim attorneys into office in 2006. Specter claimed that the changes were added by staff member Brett Tolman. For more information, see dismissal of U.S. Attorneys controversy.

Specter was very critical of Bush's wiretapping of U.S. citizens without warrants. When the story first broke, he called the effort "inappropriate" and "clearly and categorically wrong". He said that he intended to hold hearings into the matter early in 2006, and had Alberto Gonzales appear before the Senate Judiciary Committee to answer for the program. (However, Specter declined to force Gonzales to testify under oath.) On January 15, 2006, Specter mentioned impeachment and criminal prosecution as potential remedies if Bush proved to have broken the law, though he downplayed the likelihood of such an outcome.

On April 9, 2006, speaking on Fox News about the Bush administration's leaking of classified intelligence, Specter stated: "The President of the United States owes a specific explanation to the American people." However, he did vote for the 2008 amendments to the Foreign Intelligence Surveillance Act, which placed federal electronic searches almost entirely within the executive branch.

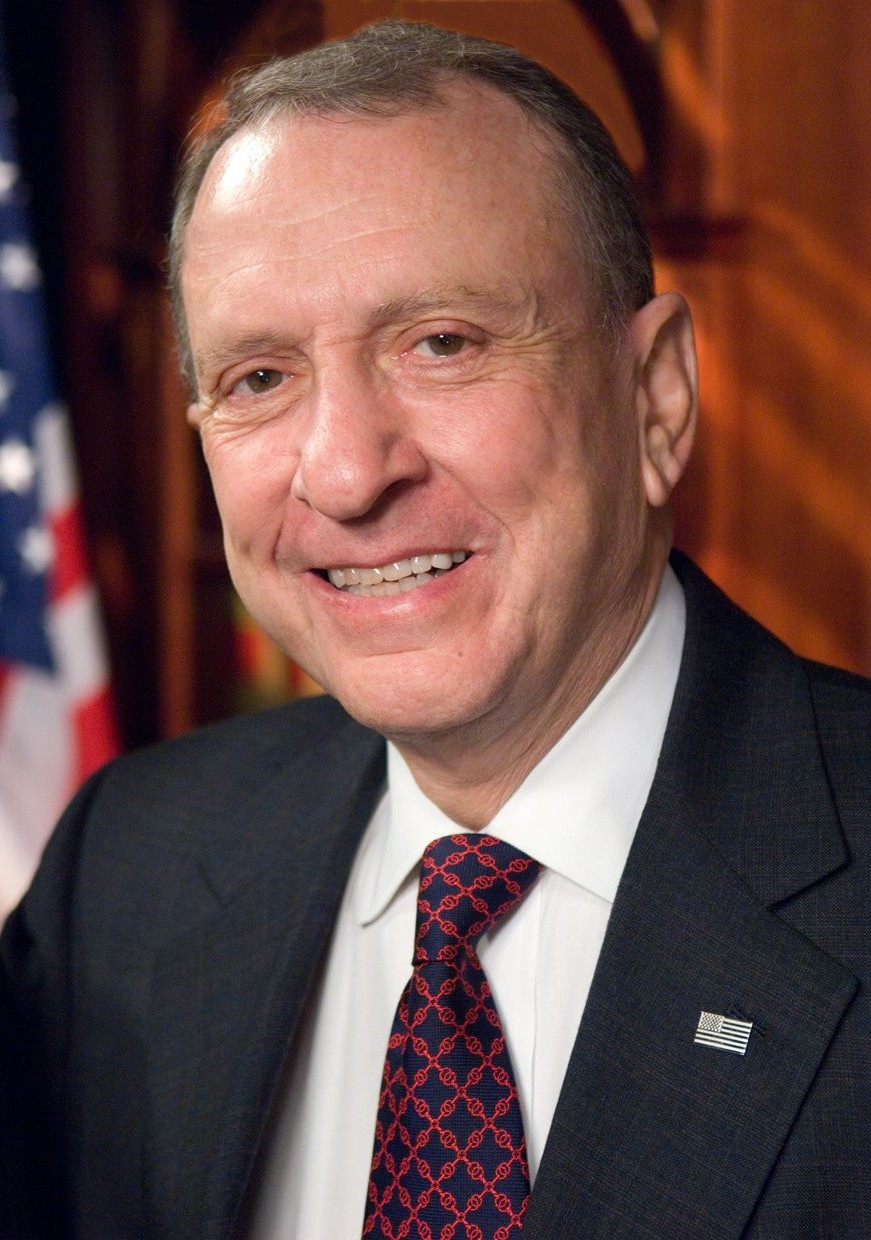
Official portrait, c. 2007

During the 2007–2008 National Football League season, Specter wrote to NFL commissioner Roger Goodell concerning the destruction of New England Patriots "Spygate" tapes. Specter, a devout and longtime Philadelphia Eagles fan, wondered if there was a link between the tapes and their Super Bowl victory over the Eagles in 2005. On February 1, 2008, Goodell stated that the tapes were destroyed because "they confirmed what I already knew about the issue". Specter released a follow-up statement:

My strong preference is for the NFL to activate a Mitchell-type investigation, I have been careful not to call for a Congressional hearing because I believe the NFL should step forward and embrace an independent inquiry and Congress is extraordinarily busy on other matters. If the NFL continues to leave a vacuum, Congress may be tempted to fill it.

Starting in 2007, Specter sponsored legislation to fix a long-standing inequity in American law that shut out a majority of U.S. Armed Forces service members convicted in courts-martial from appealing their convictions to the U.S. Supreme Court.

In 2007, Specter co-sponsored the Equal Justice for United States Military Personnel Act of 2007 with Senators Dianne Feinstein (D-Calif.), Hillary Clinton (D-NY) and Russ Feingold (D-Wis.). But the bill failed in the 110th Congress, and Specter again co-sponsored the measure in the 2009 111th Congress. In December 2008, Specter was involved in a controversy as a result of telling "Polish jokes" at New York's Rainbow Room while speaking at the annual meeting of the Commonwealth Club.

Specter voted in favor of the Senate's version of the American Recovery and Reinvestment Act of 2009 on February 10, 2009; he was one of only three Republicans to break ranks with the party and support the bill, which was favored by President Barack Obama and was unanimously supported by the Democratic senators. As a result of his support, many in the Republican mainstream began calling for his removal from office.

Specter was instrumental in ensuring that the act allocated an additional $10 billion to the National Institutes of Health over the next two years. In August 2009, more than ten years before the global COVID-19 pandemic, he joined Pennsylvania congressman Jason Altmire in leading a congressional hearing investigating whether the federal government should fund a national vaccine production center.

In late April 2009, facing the prospect of a tough Republican primary in 2010, Specter decided to switch to the Democratic Party, putting the Democrats on the "precipice" of a 60-seat majority that would allow them to pass legislation without Republican votes. Nevertheless, his new Democratic colleagues refused to let him retain his nearly 30 years of seniority on Senate committees, which would have "bumped" a number of Democrats out of coveted committee and sub-committee chairmanships. This effectively reduced him to the status of a freshman and greatly curtailed his influence in the chamber.

In October 2009, Specter called for the repeal of the Defense of Marriage Act, which he had supported in 1996. In November 2009, Specter introduced a bill to require televising U.S. Supreme Court proceedings, and explained that "[t]he Supreme Court makes pronouncements on constitutional and federal law that have direct impacts on the rights of Americans. Those rights would be substantially enhanced by televising the oral arguments of the Court so that the public can see and hear the issues presented."

Specter's career in the United States Senate ended on January 3, 2011, after his primary defeat to Joe Sestak. He was succeeded by Republican U.S. Representative Pat Toomey, who won the general election against Sestak.

=== Committee assignments ===
Specter was chairman of the Senate Select Committee on Intelligence from 1995, when the Republicans gained control of the Senate, until 1997, when he became chairman of the Committee on Veterans Affairs. He chaired that committee until 2001 and again from 2003 to 2005, during the times the Republicans controlled the Senate. He also chaired the Judiciary Committee from 2005 to 2007.

== Campaigns ==
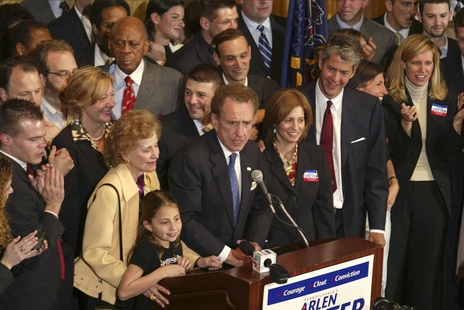
Specter campaigning for re-election

In 1980, Specter became the Republican nominee for Senate when Republican incumbent Richard Schweiker announced his retirement. He faced the former Mayor of Pittsburgh, Pete Flaherty. Specter won the election by a 2.5% margin. He was later re-elected in 1986, 1992, 1998, and 2004, despite 1992 and 1998 being bad years for Republicans. Specter ran for re-election in 2010, for the first time as a Democrat, but was defeated in the primary.

=== 1996 presidential bid ===
On March 31, 1995, Specter announced his candidacy for President of the United States, to challenge the incumbent Bill Clinton. He entered the race as an alternative to the stereotypical religious conservative image. He was critical of Pat Buchanan, Pat Robertson, and Ralph Reed, saying all three were far too conservative.

His campaign focused on balancing the federal budget, strict crime laws, and establishing relations with North Korea. His candidacy was not expected to succeed in winning the Republican nomination due to the overwhelmingly large number of social conservatives in the Republican Party. He was, however, able to gain support. Fellow Pennsylvania Senator Rick Santorum was supportive of his candidacy. Other supportive Republicans were hopeful Specter could trim the party's "far-right fringe". Although his campaign was ultimately unsuccessful at wooing conservatives, it was widely believed he could have had a strong showing among independents. On November 23, 1995, before the start of the primaries, Specter suspended his campaign to endorse Kansas Senator Bob Dole.

=== 2004 campaign ===
In 2004, Specter faced a challenge in the Republican primary election from conservative Congressman Pat Toomey, whose campaign theme was that Specter was not conservative enough. The match-up was closely watched nationally, being seen as a symbolic clash between the conservative and moderate wings of the Republican Party. However, most of the state and national Republican establishment, including the state's other senator at the time, Rick Santorum, closed ranks behind Specter. Specter was supported by President George W. Bush. Specter narrowly avoided a major upset with 51% of the primary vote. Once Specter defeated the challenge from the right, he was able to enjoy great support from independents and some Democrats in his race against U.S. Representative Joe Hoeffel, the Democratic nominee. Hoeffel trailed Specter in name recognition, campaign funds, and poll results. Although the two minor candidates in the race were seen as more conservative than Specter, they were only able to take 5.39 percent of the vote, and Specter was easily re-elected.

=== 2010 campaign ===
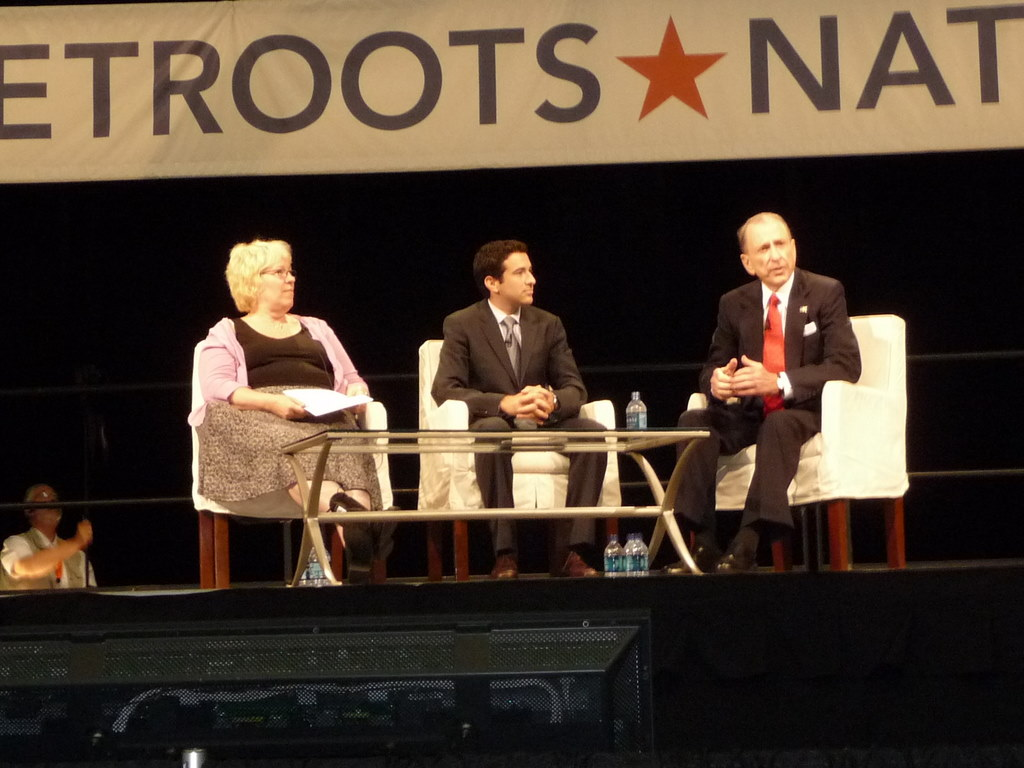
Specter (far right) at the 2009 Netroots Nation convention in Pittsburgh

Specter was up for re-election to the Senate in 2010, and expressed his plans to run again. On March 18, 2009, Specter said that he was not considering running as an independent. He said, "To eliminate any doubt, I am a Republican, and I am running for re-election in 2010 as a Republican on the Republican ticket." Subsequently, Specter's 2004 conservative GOP primary challenger, Pat Toomey, announced he would again run for the Republican nomination in the Republican senatorial primary.

However, on April 28, 2009, Specter stated that, "As the Republican Party has moved farther and farther to the right, I have found myself increasingly at odds with the Republican philosophy and more in line with the philosophy of the Democratic Party". He said that he was switching party affiliation and would run as a Democrat in the 2010 election.

In the same announcement, Specter also said that he had "surveyed the sentiments of the Republican Party in Pennsylvania and public opinion polls, observed other public opinion polls and have found that the prospects for winning a Republican primary are bleak". A March 2009 Quinnipiac poll indicated that Specter trailed his likely primary challenger, Pat Toomey, by 14% (41% for Toomey, 27% for Specter). Additional polling found that 70% of Pennsylvania Republicans disapproved of his vote in favor of the Stimulus Bill and that 52 percent of Pennsylvania Republicans disapproved of the job he was doing. Following Specter's switching parties, Republican National Committee chairman Michael Steele criticized his leaving the Republican Party, claiming that Specter had "flipped the bird" at the GOP.

On February 6, 2010, the Pennsylvania Democratic Party overwhelmingly endorsed Specter at the Democratic State Committee's annual endorsement convention, which was held in Lancaster County, Pennsylvania. He received more votes than Joe Sestak, winning more than 77% of the Pennsylvania Democratic State Committee members vote, far in excess of the 2/3 threshold needed to claim the endorsement. Sestak, however, went on to win the Democratic primary nomination on May 18.

Following the primary, Specter endorsed Sestak in the general election. Toomey defeated Sestak, 51% to 49%.

== Political views ==
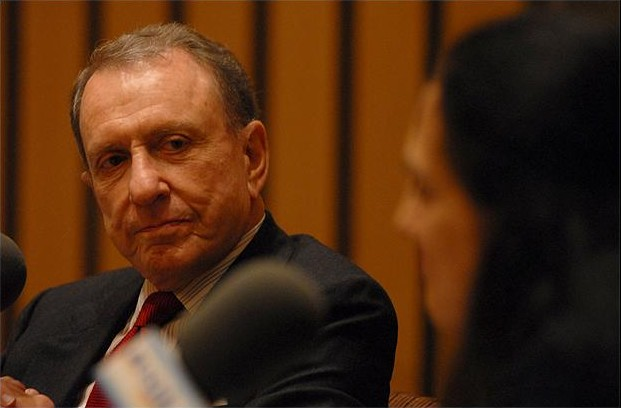
Specter, while he was being interviewed by Margot Adler for an episode of Justice Talking on "Presidential signing statements".

According to the National Journal, Specter voted with Democrats 90% of the time after switching parties, while, as a Republican, he split his votes between both parties. According to FiveThirtyEight, during January–March 2009 Specter voted with the Democrats 58% of the time. Following the support of the stimulus package and the entrance of Pat Toomey in the Republican primary, Specter began to vote 16% with Democrats. When switching to become a Democrat, he voted 69% with his new party initially, until Joe Sestak entered the Democratic primary and Specter started to vote with Democrats 97% of the time.

=== Abortion ===
Specter stated that he was "personally opposed to abortion", but was "a supporter of a woman's right to choose." He received a 20% rating from NARAL Pro-Choice America in 2005 based on certain votes related to the regulation of abortion. In 2008, he received 100%.

=== LGBT rights ===
Specter's record on LGBT rights was mixed. He voted to prohibit job discrimination based on sexual orientation and was a co-sponsor of the Matthew Shepard Hate Crimes Prevention Act. Specter was opposed to same-sex marriage, but was also opposed to a federal ban and supported civil unions. He also became opposed to the Defense of Marriage Act, which he once supported. Specter voted in favor of repealing "Don't Ask, Don't Tell" in the lame-duck session of the 111th Congress.

=== Gun control ===
Specter strongly opposed most gun control measures. He voted against the Brady Bill, background checks at gun shows, the ban on assault weapons, and trigger locks for handguns.

=== Civil rights and judiciary ===
Specter voted in favor of the bill establishing Martin Luther King Jr. Day as a federal holiday and the Civil Rights Restoration Act of 1987 (as well as to override President Reagan's veto). He supported affirmative action, and voted for the Civil Rights Act of 1991, receiving a 76 percent rating from the NAACP in 2008.

Specter voted against the nomination of Robert Bork to the U.S. Supreme Court, but voted in favor of the nominations of Clarence Thomas, John Roberts, and Samuel Alito. Specter described Anita Hill's testimony during Thomas' nomination as "perjurious in its entirety."

=== Tax cuts and minimum wage ===
In 1995, he was the only Republican to vote to limit tax cuts to individuals with incomes of less than one million dollars. He voted against CAFTA. Specter also supported an increase in the federal minimum wage. He was a leading supporter of the U.S. Public Service Academy.

=== Immigration ===
On immigration, Specter supported a "pathway to citizenship" and a "guest worker program". He introduced Senate bill S. 2611 (the Comprehensive Immigration Reform Act of 2006) on April 6, 2006, which was passed by the Senate on May 25, 2006, before reaching a stalemate in the House.

=== Health care reform ===
On health care reform, Specter was a co-sponsor of the Healthy Americans Act, a proposal he supported during both the 110th and 111th Congresses. Specter voted for the Patient Protection and Affordable Care Act, the healthcare bill passed through the Senate by every Democratic senator, on a party-line vote.

On May 3, 2009, Specter went on Meet the Press and was asked, "Would you support health care reform that puts up a government-run public plan to compete with a private plan issued by a private insurance company?" Specter responded with "no." Two months later, he changed his position. Specter believed a single-payer healthcare system should not be "taken off the table", according to an interview he had with John King on CNN.

In May 2012, New York-Presbyterian Hospital, Columbia University Medical Center, and Weill Cornell Medical College presented Specter with the annual Public Service Award for his work in expanding mental health care.

=== Card check ===
Specter received a 61% rating from the AFL–CIO. He voted for cloture on the Employee Free Choice Act in 2007. In early 2009, Specter announced he would not be voting for cloture on the same act in the 111th Congress. After Specter switched parties, he changed his position on the issue again, and wrote a letter to the unions indicating he supported card check legislation.

=== Privacy and computers ===
Spurred by the 2010 Robbins v. Lower Merion School District case, in which two high schools admitted to secretly taking 66,000 webcam photos and screenshots of students in their homes on school-issued laptops, Specter held a hearing of the Senate Judiciary Subcommittee on Crime and Drugs on March 29, 2010. He said: "The issue is one of surreptitious eavesdropping. Unbeknownst to people, their movements and activities were under surveillance." He said that Lower Merion's use of laptop cameras for surveillance convinced him that new federal legislation was needed to regulate electronic privacy.

Specter then introduced legislation in April 2010 to amend the federal Wiretap Act to clarify that it is illegal to capture silent visual images inside another person's home. He said: "This is going to become law. You have a very significant invasion of privacy with these webcams, as more information is coming to light." Speaking on the floor of the Senate, he said:

Many of us expect to be subject to ... video surveillance when we leave our homes and go out each day—at the ATM, at traffic lights, or in stores, for example. What we do not expect is to be under visual surveillance in our homes, in our bedrooms, and, most especially, we do not expect it for our children in our homes.

=== Other ===
The Jewish daily newspaper The Forward reported in the wake of the July 2009 organ trafficking scandal in the U.S. involving Rabbi Levy Izhak Rosenbaum of Brooklyn that an Organ Trafficking Prohibition Act of 2009, sponsored by Specter, had yet to be officially introduced in the U.S.

Specter criticized the federal government's policy on cancer, stating the day after Jack Kemp—the 1996 Republican vice presidential nominee and former congressman—died of cancer, that Kemp would still be alive if the federal government had done a better job funding cancer research.

On February 16, 2011, Specter wrote a letter to President Obama. As Chairman of the Senate Intelligence Committee, he stated that Jonathan Pollard should be pardoned. He stated, "Unfortunately, spying is not an uncommon practice even between allies and friendly nations."

== Post-Senate career ==
During the fall of 2011, Specter was an adjunct professor at the University of Pennsylvania Law School, where he taught a course on the relationship between Congress and the U.S. Supreme Court, focusing on separation of powers and the confirmation process. For this course the National Jurist named him as one of "23 professors to take before you die".

=== Arlen Specter Center for Public Service at Thomas Jefferson University ===
On December 21, 2011, Specter donated to Philadelphia University (now Thomas Jefferson University) nearly 2,700 boxes of historical papers and memorabilia dating from his career as a Philadelphia district attorney to his service as a United States senator, including materials associated with his role as assistant counsel on the Warren Commission. The collection is jointly managed by the University of Pittsburgh, which houses, organizes, and manages the collection. The universities collaborate on related education programing that provides access to the archives on both ends of the state. The Specter Collection supports The Arlen Specter Center for Public Service at Thomas Jefferson University.

The center is a nonpartisan initiative dedicated to promoting greater understanding of public policy issues both foreign and domestic. The center strives to accomplish these goals through support for research, educational programming, and exhibitions inspired, in part, by the senator's career and the permanent collection of his historic papers. The center is managed by the Paul J. Gutman Library at Thomas Jefferson University and located in Roxboro House, which is located nearby on campus.

Parts of Roxboro House date back to 1799. The Georgian period house constructed of frame and clapboard was expanded in 1810. At one point in its history, Roxboro House was owned by Dr. Caspar Wistar who published the first American textbook of anatomy in 1811. Wistar was president of the American Philosophical Society and his friend, Thomas Nuttall, a famous botanist, named the Wisteria vine after him. In 1965, the Philadelphia Historical Commission added this house to its list of registered buildings (No. 141). Prior to the university's purchase of the property in 1998, the house was being used as a bed and breakfast establishment.

=== Arlen Specter US Squash Center ===
US Squash's construction of the Arlen Specter US Squash Center in Philadelphia began in 2019 and was completed in 2021.

== Illness and death ==
On February 16, 2005, Specter announced that he had been diagnosed with an advanced form of Hodgkin's lymphoma, a type of cancer. Despite this, Specter continued working during chemotherapy. He ended treatment on July 22. Senator John Sununu (R-NH) shaved his head to show solidarity with Specter, who was temporarily bald while undergoing chemotherapy. On April 15, 2008, Specter announced his cancer had returned, at a stage "significantly less advanced than his Hodgkin's disease when it was originally diagnosed in 2005." He underwent a second round of chemotherapy, which ended on July 14, 2008.

On August 28, 2012, it was announced that Specter was battling a "serious form of cancer" and hospitalized. He was diagnosed six weeks earlier with a new form of the disease. On September 7, 2012, he was released from a Philadelphia hospital, but was expected to return there for additional treatment.

Specter died from complications of non-Hodgkin's lymphoma, aged 82, on October 14, 2012, at his home in Philadelphia. Statements of condolence were issued by President and Mrs. Obama, Vice President Joe Biden and Mrs. Biden, the Office of the Governor of Pennsylvania, and by many of his colleagues and former opponents in the U.S. Congress, the Pennsylvania legislature, and the city of Philadelphia, among many others. Senator Specter, while he had been accused of alienating both parties due to certain positions he took and due to the two times he switched parties, among other issues, was nonetheless respected by many as a principled statesman who did much for his state and country, including by those in politics and the legislature, both in Pennsylvania and his home state, Kansas, as well as across the U.S. and beyond. He was the longest-serving of Pennsylvania's U.S. Senators. As a sign of this respect and out of mourning, President Obama ordered U.S. flags to be lowered to half-staff at public institutions and military bases in Washington, D.C., and the rest of the country on his day of interment.

== Books ==
- Specter, Arlen; Katz, Marvin (1967). Police Guide to Search and Seizure Interrogation and Confession. Philadelphia: Chilton Books. OCLC 1312201.
- Murray, John P.; Rubin, H. Ted; Specter, Arlen; Rector, Milton G. (1983). Status Offenders: A Sourcebook. Boys Town, NE: Boys Town Center. ISBN 0938510037. OCLC 8785321.
- Specter, Arlen; with Charles Robbins (2000). Passion for Truth: From Finding JFK's Single Bullet to Questioning Anita Hill to Impeaching Clinton. New York: William Morrow. ISBN 9780060198497. OCLC 45188491.
- Smerconish, Michael A. (2004). Flying Blind: How Political Correctness Continues to Compromise Airline Safety Post 9/11. Foreword: Arlen Specter. Philadelphia: Running Press. ISBN 9780762423767. OCLC 56512972.
- Specter, Arlen; with Frank J. Scaturro (2008). Never Give In: Battling Cancer in the Senate. New York: St. Martin's Press. ISBN 9780312383060. OCLC 180751979.

== Legislation sponsored or cosponsored ==
The following table links to the Congressional Record hosted by the Library of Congress. All the specifics and actions taken for each individual piece of legislation that Specter either sponsored or cosponsored can be viewed in detail there. "Original bills" and "'Original amendments" indicate instances where Sen. Specter pledged to support the legislation at the time it was initially introduced and entered into the Senate record, rather than later in the legislative process.

Senator Arlen Specter – U.S. Senate – [D-PA]

Years Covered	All bills sponsored	All amendments sponsored	All bills cosponsored	All amendments cosponsored	Original bills cosponsored	Original amendments cosponsored
1981–82	42	38	188	48	95	44
1983–84	92	52	216	37	98	37
1985–86	90	44	327	53	171	52
1987–88	44	49	260	32	151	31
1989–90	37	61	262	26	112	24
1991–92	76	71	359	33	142	34
1993–94	33	52	178	24	66	20
1995–96	33	46	103	35	63	32
1997–98	75	49	120	26	63	24
1999–00	54	31	168	24	89	24
2001–05	46	51	188	36	103	31
2003–04	52	61	203	36	94	25
2005–06	85	50	179	24	96	13
2007–08	52	38	325	77	181	51
2009–10	22	6	58	10	39	8

Note: The numbers for the current session of Congress may no longer reflect the actual numbers as they are still actively in session.

The THOMAS database shows Sen. Arlen Specter has withdrawn his one-time support of legislation by adding his cosponsorship to introduced legislation a total of five times during the time this statistic first started being compiled by them:

- One bill in 1991–1992
- One amendment in 1991–1992
- One bill in 1993–1994
- One bill in 1997–1998
- One bill in 1999–2000

== See also ==
- List of American politicians who switched parties in office
- List of United States senators who switched parties
- List of Jewish members of the United States Congress

Legal offices
Preceded by James C. Crumlish Jr.	District Attorney of Philadelphia; 1966–1974	Succeeded by F. Emmett Fitzpatrick
Party political offices
Preceded by James McDermott	Republican nominee for Mayor of Philadelphia; 1967	Succeeded by Thacher Longstreth
Preceded by Dick Schweiker	Republican nominee for U.S. Senator from Pennsylvania (Class 3); 1980, 1986, 1992, 1998, 2004	Succeeded by Pat Toomey
U.S. Senate
Preceded by Dick Schweiker	United States Senator (Class 3) from Pennsylvania; 1981–2011; Served alongside: John Heinz, Harris Wofford, Rick Santorum, Bob Casey	Succeeded by Pat Toomey
Preceded by Dennis DeConcini	Chair of the Senate Intelligence Committee; 1995–1997	Succeeded by Richard Shelby
Preceded by Alan Simpson	Chair of the Senate Veterans' Affairs Committee; 1997–2001	Succeeded by Jay Rockefeller
Preceded by Jay Rockefeller	Chair of the Senate Veterans' Affairs Committee; 2003–2005	Succeeded by Larry Craig
Preceded by Orrin Hatch	Chair of the Senate Judiciary Committee; 2005–2007	Succeeded by Patrick Leahy
