= F. Emmett Fitzpatrick =

American lawyer (1930–2014)

Emmett Fitzpatrick

20th District Attorney of Philadelphia, Pennsylvania
- In office January 7, 1974 – January 2, 1978
- Preceded by: Arlen Specter
- Succeeded by: Ed Rendell

Personal details
- Born: March 20, 1930 Philadelphia, Pennsylvania
- Died: September 2, 2014 (aged 84) Cape May Court House, New Jersey
- Party: Democratic
- Education: Saint Joseph's University; University of Pennsylvania Law School
- Profession: Attorney, professor, politician

F. Emmett Fitzpatrick Jr. (March 20, 1930 – September 2, 2014) was an American politician, attorney and professor. A noted criminal defense attorney, he served as the District Attorney of Philadelphia, Pennsylvania, between 1974 and 1978.

== Early life and education ==
Fitzpatrick was born and raised in Philadelphia, Pennsylvania, and received his BA in political science from Saint Joseph's University (then known as Saint Joseph's College) in 1952. He received his LL.B. degree from the University of Pennsylvania Law School in 1955.

== Professional career ==
Fitzpatrick initially gained notoriety through his representation of defendants in several high-profile federal criminal cases, including Racketeer Influenced and Corrupt Organizations Act-related prosecutions.

=== District attorney's office ===
He served as an assistant district attorney from 1956 through 1962, and as first assistant district attorney from 1962 through 1966.

In 1973, he was recruited by Philadelphia Democratic Party leaders to run against incumbent Republican District Attorney Arlen Specter. He went on to win the election handily, and took office the following January. During his tenure as district attorney, he sought to shake up the day-to-day operations of the office, whose perceived ineffectiveness was a major theme of his campaign against Specter.

Fitzpatrick was, however, the subject of several ethics-related complaints during his time as district attorney. Critics questioned the handling of a cocktail party held after Fitzpatrick's election in which attorneys who may have had future dealings with the district attorney's office paid $50 to attend. All proceeds from the reception went to Fitzpatrick, and the matter was recommended to the Pennsylvania Supreme Court's disciplinary board for investigation. Fitzpatrick was also criticized for sentence recommendations he made as district attorney for individuals he had previously defended while in private practice.

In the 1977 Democratic primary, he was defeated for renomination by Ed Rendell, who campaigned against perceived corruption within the district attorney's office, and went on to win the general election.

== Post-political career ==
After his defeat, Fitzpatrick taught numerous educational seminars and an advanced trial techniques course at the Widener University School of Law. He also testified as a legal expert in various court proceedings and appeared frequently as a legal commentator on radio and television programs, including WPVI's Inside Story. Fitzpatrick also went-on to found his own law firm, based in Philadelphia.

He died in a nursing home in Cape May Court House, New Jersey, on September 2, 2014. He had Alzheimer's disease for four years.

== Portrayal in the media ==
In the 2019 film The Irishman, Fitzpatrick is portrayed by Stephen Mailer.

Legal offices
Preceded by Arlen Specter	District Attorney of Philadelphia, Pennsylvania; 1974–1978	Succeeded by Ed Rendell
