= Victor H. Blanc =

American politician and lawyer

- Blanc in 1955

Personal details
- Born: Victor Hugo Blanc; August 31, 1897 Philadelphia, Pennsylvania
- Died: December 16, 1968 (aged 71) Haverford Township, Pennsylvania
- Party: Democratic
- Education: University of Pennsylvania
- Occupation: Lawyer

Military service
- Allegiance: United States
- Branch/service: Navy (World War I); Army Air Corps (World War II)
- Battles/wars: World War I; World War II

Victor Hugo Blanc (August 31, 1897 – December 16, 1968) was a Democratic lawyer and politician from Philadelphia.

Blanc was born in Philadelphia in 1897, the son of Samuel and Pauline Blanc. His parents were Jewish immigrants from Odessa, Russia (modern-day Ukraine). Blanc graduated from West Philadelphia High School before attending the University of Pennsylvania, where he received a bachelor's degree and a law degree in 1919 and 1923, respectively. While still in college, he served in the United States Navy in World War I.

Blanc had a private law practice before joining the state Attorney General's office. He was active in Philadelphia civic organizations and served as president of the National League of Masonic Clubs in 1938. At the outbreak of World War II, Blanc rejoined the military, this time as an officer in the United States Army Air Corps. After the war, he continued his law practice, moving to work as an assistant district attorney in the Philadelphia District Attorney's office in 1950. As an assistant district attorney, Blanc won headlines by investigating police graft. That same year, he was named chairman of the County Board of Public Assistance.

In 1951, Blanc ran for Philadelphia City Council. Under the city charter adopted earlier that year, Philadelphians elected a seventeen-member city council, with ten members representing districts of the city, and the remaining seven being elected at-large; Blanc ran for one of the at-large seats. He won, part of a Democratic wave that swept the city government out of Republican control for the first time in 67 years. While on city council, Blanc led an investigation into corruption related to construction at Philadelphia International Airport.

Blanc returned to prosecution in 1955 when he won election as District Attorney of Philadelphia, succeeding Richardson Dilworth, who had resigned to run for mayor. Blanc, who won the Democratic primary unopposed, handily defeated Republican Wilhelm Knauer in the general election that November. Two years later, in 1957, he was elected to a four-year term, even though Mayor Dilworth, a fellow Democrat, declined to endorse him. Before that term ended, Governor David L. Lawrence appointed Blanc to the court of common pleas to fill the remaining term of Gerald F. Flood, who had been elected to the Pennsylvania Superior Court. Blanc won election to a full ten-year term on the court in 1961. He developed Alzheimer's disease and was relieved of his duties on the court in 1964. Four years later, he died in Haverford State Hospital at the age of 71. He was buried in Mount Sinai Cemetery in Philadelphia.

== Sources ==
- "Blanc Named Phila. Judge". The Plain Speaker. Hazleton, Pennsylvania. December 29, 1960.
- "Blanc Won his Spurs on Police, Airport Probes". The Philadelphia Inquirer. November 9, 1955.
- "Democrats Post Smashing Victories in Phila., Pittsburgh and Scranton". Delaware County Daily Times. Chester, Pennsylvania. November 6, 1957.
- "Victor H. Blanc Dies, Ex-D.A. and Judge, 71". The Philadelphia Inquirer. December 17, 1968.
- "Woman Elected to First Seat in City Council". The Philadelphia Inquirer. November 7, 1951.
