= Joseph C. Goulden =

American writer and political reporter (1934–2025)

Joseph Chesley Goulden (May 23, 1934 – October 17, 2025) was an American writer and political reporter.

== Background ==
Goulden was born in Marshall, Texas, on May 23, 1934. His father owned the Texian Book Store located on the southeast corner of the Harrison County Courthouse square in Marshall. Joseph learned to read at age four. He was a graduate of the University of Texas. His sons are Troy and Jimmy Goulden.

In 1979, he married Leslie C. Smith, an attorney. He died from heart failure on October 17, 2025, at the age of 91.

== Career ==
Goulden was a member of the U.S. Army, where he was trained in counter-intelligence. Later he entered journalism, working for The Dallas Morning News. At The Philadelphia Inquirer, he worked first as an investigative reporter and later as head of the Washington bureau. He became a freelance writer in 1968 and wrote for a number of publications, including Harper's, The Nation, The Washingtonian, and The Washington Times.

He was a member of the Virginia Military Institute's International Studies Advisory Board.

== Selected publications ==
=== Authored ===
- The Curtis Caper 1965
- Monopoly 1968
- Truth is the First Casualty 1969
- The Money Givers 1971
- The Superlawyers 1972
- Meany 1972
- The Benchwarmers 1974
- The Best Years, 1945-1950 1976
- Korea: The Untold Story of the War. McGraw-Hill, New York, 1983. ISBN 0070235805
- Fit to Print: A.M. Rosenthal and His Times, Lyle Stuart Inc., 1988. ISBN 0818404744
- The Dictionary of Espionage: Spyspeak into English. 1986. (Revised edition Dover Press, 2012.)

=== Edited ===
- Mencken's Last Campaign: H.L. Mencken on the 1948 Election. New Republic, Washington DC, 1976. (Introduction and editor) ISBN 0915220180
