= District Attorney of Philadelphia =

Public elected office in Philadelphia, USA

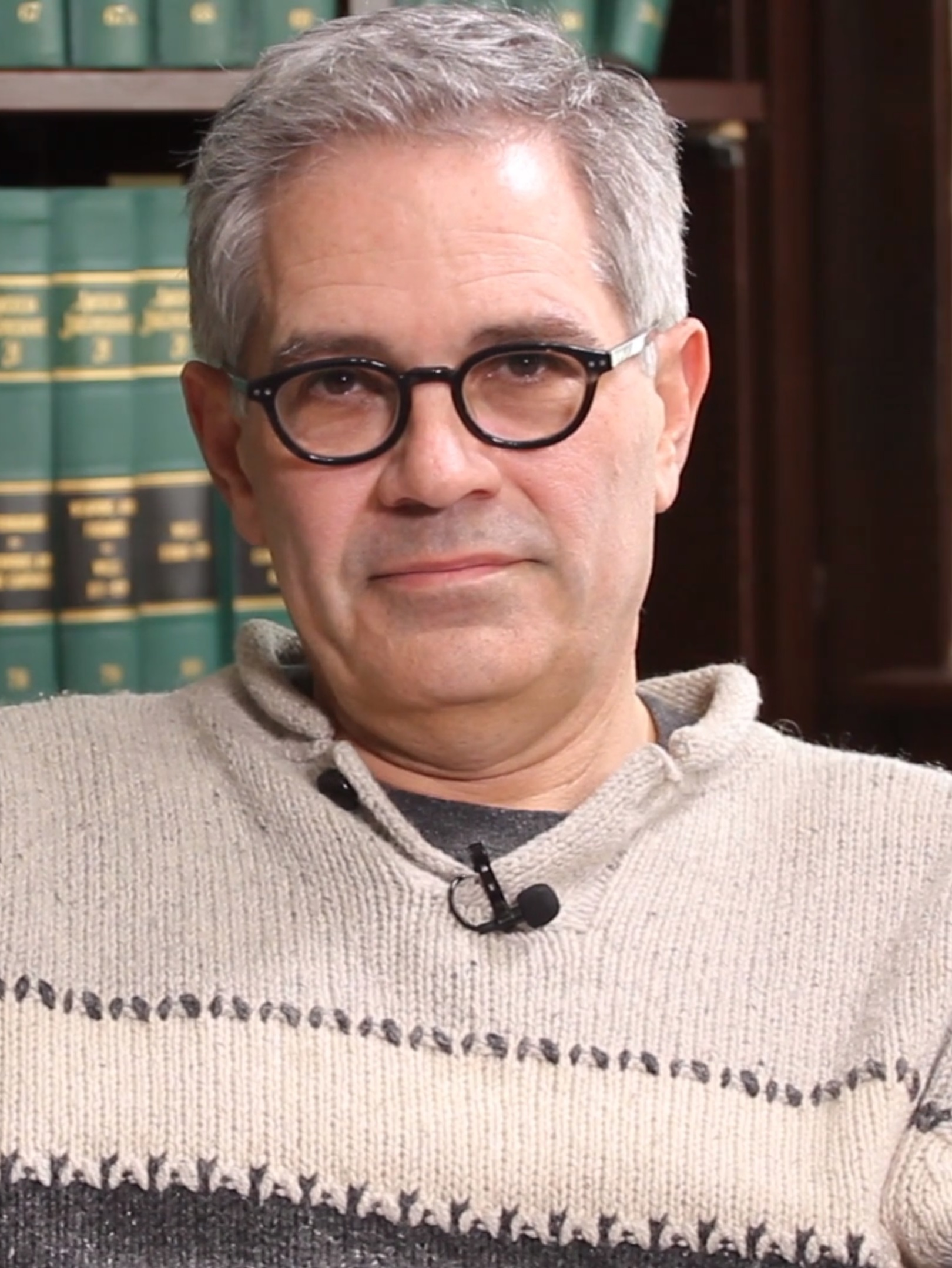
- Incumbent; Larry Krasner since January 1, 2018
- Term length: 4 years
- Formation: 1850
- First holder: Horn R. Kneass
- Salary: $ 175,576 (2017)

The office of the District Attorney of Philadelphia is the largest prosecutor's office in the US state of Pennsylvania and oversees a jurisdiction that includes more than 1.5 million citizens of both the city and county of Philadelphia. The current District Attorney of Philadelphia is Larry Krasner. The district attorney represents the Commonwealth of Pennsylvania and the City & County of Philadelphia in all criminal and other prosecutions.

The district attorney is an elected office, and terms begin on the first Monday in January following the election. Prior to 1850, the functions of this office were performed by a deputy state attorney-general. An Act of 3 May 1850 P.L. 654 authorized the voters of each of Pennsylvania's counties to elect one person, of requisite legal background to serve as district attorney for a term of three years. The term was extended to four years under the State Constitution of 1874, Article 14.

== List of District Attorneys of Philadelphia ==
District Attorney	Term	Political party
Horn R. Kneass	1850–1851	Republican
William B. Reed	1851–1856	Republican
William B. Mann	1856–1868	Republican (On November 3, 1856, Lewis C. Cassidy had been elected district attorney but his election was successfully contested by William B. Mann.)
Furman Sheppard	1868–1869	Republican
Charles Gibbons	1869–1870	Republican (On November 2, 1868, Furman Shepard was duly elected and sworn in as District Attorney, however, Mr. Gibbons contested the election and the court declared him the victor, in 1870 the court realized a tabulation error and reappointed Furmand.
Furman Sheppard	1870–1871	Republican
William B. Mann	1871–1875	Republican
Furman Sheppard	1875–1878	Republican
Henry S. Hagert	1878–1881	Republican
George S. Graham	1880–1899	Republican (Elected Nov. 2, 1880, declined to be a candidate in 1899, later elected to the US House of Representatives in 1912)
P. Frederick Rothermel	1899–1902	Republican
John Weaver	1902–1903	Republican (Elected in 1901 and left office after being elected Mayor of Philadelphia in 1903.)
John C. Bell	1903–1907	Republican (Appointed in 1903 to fill term of John Weaver, reelected 1904, declined renomination)
Samuel P. Rotan	1906–1926	Republican (First elected in 1906)
Charles Edwin Fox	1926–1928	Republican (First Jewish DA in Philadelphia)
John Monaghan	1928–1931	Republican
Charles F. Kelley	1931–1941	Republican (died in office)
John H. Maurer	1941–1952	Republican
Richardson Dilworth	January 7, 1952 – January 2, 1956	Democratic (elected Mayor of Philadelphia in 1955)
Victor H. Blanc	January 2, 1956 – January 8, 1962	Democratic
James C. Crumlish, Jr.	January 8, 1962 – January 3, 1966	Democratic (Appointed district attorney to finish out the four-year term of Victor Blanc, who had been named a judge, later a longtime Commonwealth Court Judge, himself.)
Arlen Specter	January 3, 1966 – January 7, 1974	Republican (two four-year terms, lost his pursuit to a third term in 1973 general election.)
F. Emmett Fitzpatrick	January 7, 1974 – January 2, 1978	Democratic (lost 1977 primary election to Ed Rendell)
Edward G. Rendell	January 2, 1978 – January 6, 1986	Democratic (elected to two four-year terms)
Ronald D. Castille	January 6, 1986 – March 12, 1991	Republican (elected two four-year terms, resigned his office for an unsuccessful campaign for Mayor of Philadelphia)
Lynne Abraham	May 15, 1991 – January 4, 2010	Democratic (succeeded Ron Castille; elected to four four-year terms)
Seth Williams	January 4, 2010 – June 29, 2017	Democratic
Kelley B. Hodge	July 24, 2017 – December 31, 2017	Democratic (interim)
Larry Krasner	January 1, 2018 – present	Democratic (incumbent)
