= 1957 Philadelphia municipal election =

- November 5, 1957

The 1957 Philadelphia municipal election, held on November 5, involved the election of the district attorney, city controller, and the remainder of a term for one city council seat, as well as several row offices and judgeships. Democrats were successful citywide, continuing a run of victories racked up after the passage of a new city charter in 1951 despite growing divisions between factions of the party. Victor H. Blanc, the incumbent district attorney, led the Democratic ticket to victory. They held the city council seat and took two citywide offices that Republicans had won in 1953. In the judges' elections, most were endorsed by both parties but in the one race that pitted a Democratic candidate against a Republican, the Democrats were successful in seating their candidate, former Congressman Earl Chudoff.

== Background ==
After the Democrats' electoral victories in 1951 and 1955, they hoped to further solidify their hold on city offices by ousting the few Republicans left in power. At the same time, however, they were faced with growing divisions within their own party. Democrats had won in 1951 by combining with reform-minded Republicans and independents. By 1954, however, some Democrats led by Council President James Tate tried to weaken the civil service reforms of the new charter by allowing city employees to become involved in electioneering once more. They fell just short of the two-thirds vote in Council to put their amendments on the ballot, but in 1956, Tate's faction again proposed charter amendments aimed at weakening civil service protections and this time found the required vote to put it on to the ballot for popular approval. The referendum failed in a vote that April.

The rift widened by 1957 as U.S. Senator (and former Democratic mayor of Philadelphia) Joseph S. Clark Jr. joined his successor, Richardson Dilworth, in refusing to back the Democratic ticket, citing mismanagement and political cronyism. Republicans, led by City Committee Chairman Wilbur H. Hamilton, used the occasion to woo reform-minded voters by claiming their ticket was free of machine control, and that they "owe nothing to the political bosses." Meanwhile, voter interest in the off-year election was low despite extensive radio and print advertising by both parties.

== District Attorney ==
In an arrangement that predates the 1951 City Charter, Philadelphia elects a District Attorney independent of the mayor's office. Dilworth had been elected to the office in 1951 but resigned in 1955 to run for mayor. Victor H. Blanc, a city councilman and former assistant district attorney, was elected to fill the unexpired term. Blanc was a veteran of both World Wars who, during his time on the council, led an investigation into corruption in construction at Philadelphia International Airport. In 1957, he ran for a full four-year term, but his connection with machine politics led Clark and Dilworth to withhold their endorsement of him. The Republican nominee was Emil F. Goldhaber, a local lawyer who had worked in the state attorney general's office and in private practice. He was unopposed in the primary. The split in the Democratic leadership made the district attorney's race the liveliest of the campaign, according to The Philadelphia Inquirer writer Joseph H. Miller.

Blanc overcame the intra-party dissension to defeat Goldhaber, although his vote total was reduced to 56%, down from the 60% of the vote he received two years earlier. Blanc thanked the voters "who showed great faith" in him, and Goldhaber conceded by 10:30 p.m. on election night. Blanc would hold the position of district attorney until 1960, when he was appointed to the Court of Common Pleas. Goldhaber returned to private practice and was also later appointed to the bench, serving as a bankruptcy judge from 1966 to 1986.

1957 Philadelphia district attorney election
Party	Candidate	Votes	%	±%
Democratic	Victor H. Blanc (incumbent)	303,633	56.23	−3.96
Republican	Emil F. Goldhaber	236,357	43.77	+3.96

== City Controller ==
Under the 1951 City Charter, Philadelphia elects a City Controller to sit at the head of an independent auditing department. The Controller approves all payments made out of the city treasury and audits the executive departments. As an independently elected official, the Controller is not responsible to the mayor or the city council. The office was created as one of the good-government reforms intended to reduce the corruption that had previously plagued city government and led to the reform coalition of 1951.

Republican Foster A. Dunlap had won the office in 1953, making it one of the few his party controlled in the city. The party renominated him without opposition. Democrat Alexander Hemphill was the organization-backed candidate, and he defeated political outsider George Glick without difficulty. Hemphill, who had worked with reformers in the campaigns that ultimately defeated the Republican organization in 1951, was a lawyer with a long history of involvement in Democratic politics. Unlike in the district attorney's race, the Democrats were united on the choice for city controller and Clark and Dilworth both publicly endorsed Hemphill. The result was a solid victory for the Democrats as Hemphill was elected by a thirteen-point margin.

1957 Philadelphia City Controller election
Party	Candidate	Votes	%	±%
Democratic	Alexander Hemphill	304,859	56.96	+8.25
Republican	Foster A. Dunlap	230,350	43.04	−8.25

== Other row offices ==
The Republicans had also maintained their hold on the patronage-rich office of Register of Wills in 1953, electing attorney and former football star Robert C. Duffy, by a slim margin over the Democratic nominee, former Congressman Francis R. Smith. Duffy did not run for re-election, and the Republican nomination was contested between factions of the Republican party organization, a "regular" faction, led by Hamilton, former Sheriff Austin Meehan, and Board of Revision of Taxes President William F. Meade; and an insurgent faction led by ward leaders dissatisfied with the hierarchy's control over nominations. The establishment faction carried the day, winning the nomination for their man, Joseph P. Gorham. Democrats were more united on their choice, selecting Deputy State Insurance Commissioner Bernard J. Kelley in an uncontested primary.

Kelley was victorious, reversing the Republicans' gains of four years earlier and winning by a fifteen-point margin. The story was similar in the special election for the clerk of the court of quarter sessions (a court whose jurisdiction is now exercised by the court of common pleas). In the race to replace Democrat Joseph A. Scanlon, who died earlier in the year, Democratic state representative Louis Amarando defeated Republican Herbert R. Cain Jr., by a 58% to 42% margin. As Miller wrote the next day, the "victory also demonstrated the supremacy of the [Democratic] party in Philadelphia from an organizational standpoint".

1957 Philadelphia Register of Wills election
Party	Candidate	Votes	%	±%
Democratic	Bernard J. Kelley	315,617	57.79	+8.50
Republican	Joseph P. Gorham	230,552	42.21	−8.50

1957 Philadelphia Clerk of the Court of Quarter Sessions election
Party	Candidate	Votes	%	±%
Democratic	Louis Amarando	304,844	57.99	−1.85
Republican	Herbert R. Cain Jr.	220,854	42.01	+1.85

== City Council special election ==
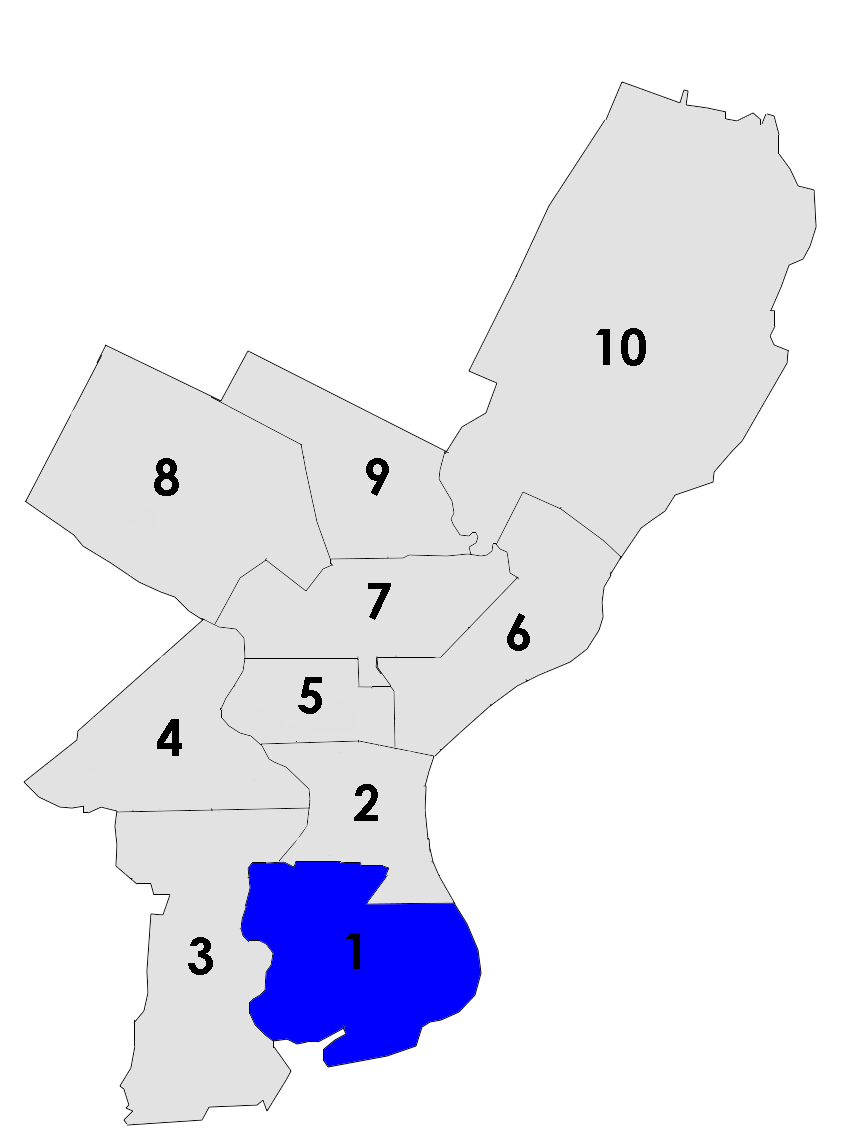
The 1st councilmanic district in 1957

Voters in the 1st district also voted for city council in 1957 in a special election called after the death of Councilman Thomas I. Guerin the year before. Democratic ward leaders in the district, which covered most of South Philadelphia, nominated Emanuel Weinberg, leader of the 39th ward and a former state Deputy Secretary of Insurance. The nomination was not without controversy: Governor George M. Leader had fired Weinberg along with several other political appointees who were found, as The Philadelphia Inquirer reported, to have "enjoyed immunity from supervision and control and were permitted to pursue their private enterprises in addition to their State duties."

The nomination drew criticism from reform-minded Democrats, including Clark, who said the nomination showed "contempt for the independent vote." Weinberg's nomination also disappointed Guerin's widow, Mary C. Guerin, who ran as an independent. Guerin noted that Weinberg had been fired from his state job for good reason, saying "one would suppose that Governor Leader did not fire him for being late for work." Despite the split in Democratic support, Weinberg achieved a clear victory over Guerin and their Republican opponent, John Donnelly.

1957 Philadelphia city council special election, district 1
Party	Candidate	Votes	%	±%
Democratic	Emanuel Weinberg	34,462	62.37	+0.15
Republican	John Donnelly	19,288	34.91	−2.87
Fidelity	Mary C. Guerin	1,508	2.72	+2.72

== Judges and magistrates ==
Although Pennsylvania's judges are elected in partisan elections, there had been a tradition of not challenging the re-election of incumbents, or "sitting judges." To that end, judicial candidates were typically endorsed by both major parties. The parties had followed the sitting judge tradition in 1951, but in 1953 the Democrats broke the informal pact and endorsed just three of the sitting judges. The result was an unusually intense contest for the thirteen seats available, which the Republicans won.

By 1957, the old order was mostly re-established as fourteen of the fifteen judges were endorsed for re-election by both parties and returned to office without opposition. The fifteenth, 75-year-old Joseph L. Kun, was President Judge of the Court of Common Pleas and had served on the court for thirty years. In February, lawyers from the city bar association voted by a 2-to-1 margin to not endorse his re-election, calling him unqualified to hold office. Despite the bipartisan effort against him among the city's lawyers, Kun filed for re-election in both parties' primaries. Kun won the Republican nomination handily, but lost the Democratic nomination to Earl Chudoff, a member of the federal House of Representatives from Pennsylvania's 4th congressional district. In November, Chudoff won easily, taking 58% of the vote. Kun, already in poor health, retired from the profession of law and died in 1961. Chudoff remained on the bench until 1974.

There were also thirteen seats open for magistrate, a local court, the duties of which are now performed by the Philadelphia Municipal Court. In the magistrate races, each political party could nominate eight candidates, and voters could only vote for eight, with the result being that the majority party could only take eight of the thirteen seats, leaving five for the minority party. The Democrats took the maximum number of eight magistracies, with incumbents Vincent A. Dean and William Cibotti leading the ticket. Republicans were held to just the five slots allotted them, with incumbent Benjamin W. Schwartz taking the most votes of his party's nominees.

== Ballot questions ==
In the primary ballot, voters agreed to divide the 35th ward into seven wards, accounting for the increased settlement in the city's Northeast section that made the ward extremely populous. The action brought the total number of wards to 58. The measure had support from both parties and passed overwhelmingly. In the general election, two loans questions were on the ballot: $16 million for general municipal improvements, and $10 million for water and sewer systems. Both measures passed.

== See also ==
- List of members of Philadelphia City Council since 1952

== Sources ==
Newspapers

- "Sitting Judge Policy 'Scrapped' By Democrats; GOP Offers Slate". The Philadelphia Inquirer. March 15, 1953. pp. 1, 12 – via Newspapers.com.
- Miller, Joseph H. (November 4, 1953). "Republicans Victors In Phila.; Meyner Defeats Troast in N.J." The Philadelphia Inquirer. pp. 1, 2 – via Newspapers.com.
- "[1953] Phila. Vote At A Glance". The Philadelphia Inquirer. November 5, 1953. p. 2 – via Newspapers.com.
- Miller, Joseph H. (February 18, 1954). "Council Unit OKs 6-Point Plan to 'Wreck' Charter". The Philadelphia Inquirer. p. 1 – via Newspapers.com.
- "Blanc Won His Spurs In Police, Airport Probes". The Philadelphia Inquirer. November 9, 1955. p. 2 – via Newspapers.com.
- Schraga, Saul (February 24, 1956a). "Council Puts Ripper Up In Primary". The Philadelphia Inquirer. pp. 1, 11 – via Newspapers.com.
- Schraga, Saul (April 25, 1956b). "Voters Beat Proposal To Rip Up Charter". The Philadelphia Inquirer. pp. 1, 4 – via Newspapers.com.
- Miller, Joseph H. (January 23, 1957a). "Leader Fires Torquato Over Plush State Jobs, Orders 23 Others Suspended". The Philadelphia Inquirer. pp. 1, 12 – via Newspapers.com.
- Miller, Joseph H. (February 2, 1957b). "Bar Association Vows Fight To Defeat Kun". The Philadelphia Inquirer. p. 11 – via Newspapers.com.
- Miller, Joseph H. (May 22, 1957c). "Both Organization Slates Win Primary". The Philadelphia Inquirer. pp. 1, 5 – via Newspapers.com.
- "Seven-Way Division for Giant 35th Ward Overwhelmingly OKd". The Philadelphia Inquirer. May 22, 1957. p. 5 – via Newspapers.com.
- Miller, Joseph H. (September 21, 1957d). "Clark Adds Blast Against Pair Of Party Nominees". The Philadelphia Inquirer. p. 12 – via Newspapers.com.
- "Guerin Widow Bids For Council As Independent". The Philadelphia Inquirer. September 21, 1957. p. 12 – via Newspapers.com.
- Miller, Joseph H. (October 27, 1957e). "Voter Interest at Record Low as Election Day Nears". The Philadelphia Inquirer. p. B11 – via Newspapers.com.
- "Clark Refuses to OK Ticket; GOP Declares Candidates Unbossed". The Philadelphia Inquirer. November 2, 1957. p. 11 – via Newspapers.com.
- Miller, Joseph H. (November 5, 1957f). "GOP Depending on Rivals' Split for Upset Today". The Philadelphia Inquirer. pp. 1, 12 – via Newspapers.com.
- Miller, Joseph H. (November 6, 1957g). "Democrats Take Every Office in City". The Philadelphia Inquirer. pp. 1, 3 – via Newspapers.com.
- "Results of Votes for City Offices". The Philadelphia Inquirer. November 7, 1957. p. 4 – via Newspapers.com.
- "Judge Joseph L. Kun Dies at 78; Served 30 Years on Bench". The Philadelphia Inquirer. June 16, 1961. p. 6 – via Newspapers.com.
- "Victor H. Blanc Dies, Ex-D.A. and Judge, 71". The Philadelphia Inquirer. December 17, 1968. p. 34 – via Newspapers.com.
- "Alexander Hemphill, 64; served as city controller". The Philadelphia Inquirer. January 31, 1986. p. 17-C – via Newspapers.com.
- Simmons, Rose (May 18, 1993). "Earl Chudoff, 85, ex-judge, lawmaker". The Philadelphia Inquirer. p. D8 – via Newspapers.com.
- Wallace, Andy (October 6, 1993). "Emil F. Goldhaber, judge, 90". The Philadelphia Inquirer. p. D7 – via Newspapers.com.

Report

- Committee of Seventy (1980). "The Charter: A History" (PDF). Philadelphia. Archived from the original (PDF) on October 21, 2016.
