= 1953 Philadelphia municipal election =

- November 3, 1953

Philadelphia's municipal election of November 3, 1953, was the second held under the city charter of 1951 and represented the first test of the Democratic city government of Mayor Joseph S. Clark Jr. In the 1951 election, the voters had elected a Democratic mayor for the first time in 67 years, breaking the Republican hold on political power in the city. They had also elected a majority-Democratic City Council along with Democrats for district attorney and other citywide offices (also called row offices). In 1953, the voters had the chance to continue the Democratic trend or to block it in the election for City Controller, Register of Wills, and various judges and magistrates. On election day, the Republican organization recovered from their 1951 losses, electing all their candidates citywide. Republicans celebrated the victory, but subsequent Democratic triumphs in the 1955 and 1959 elections made the 1953 result more of an aberration than a true comeback for the once-powerful Philadelphia Republican machine.

== Background ==
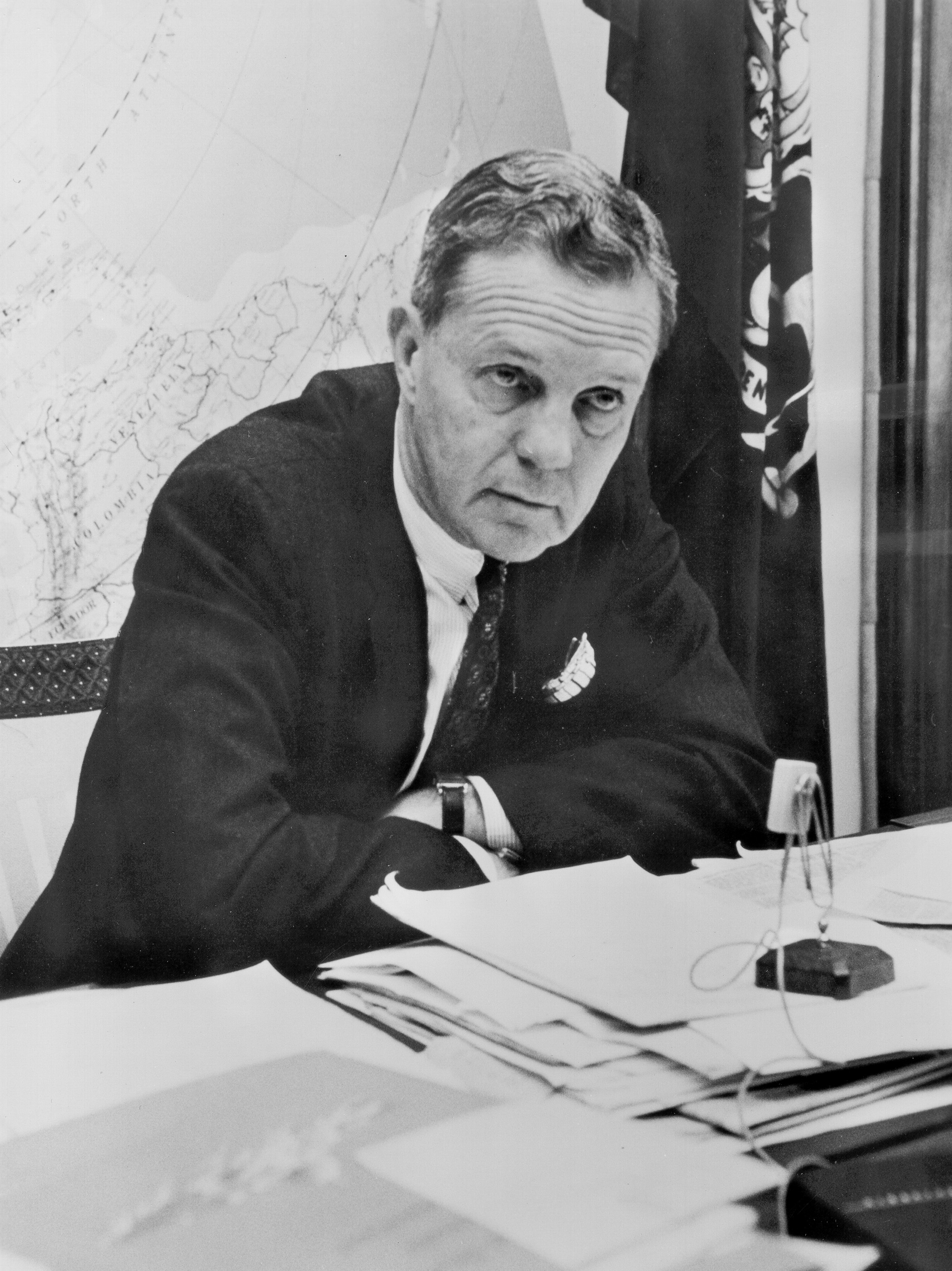
Mayor Joseph S. Clark Jr., was not on the ballot in 1953, but both parties made the election a referendum on his administration.

After the Democrats' 1951 electoral victory, Philadelphia's once-powerful Republican party organization lost the hold on city government that they had held since 1884. In 1953, they sought to regain their former control over the city's political scene. Both sides presented the election as a referendum on the administration of Mayor Joseph S. Clark Jr., a Democrat elected with the support of reform-minded Republicans and independents in 1951. In an op-ed in The Philadelphia Inquirer the Sunday before the election, Republican City Committee chairman William J. Hamilton called the election "an opportunity to pass judgment upon the administration of Mayor Clark who promised so much and gave so little." He called the Clark administration "spendthrift and mismanaged", and promised "honest and efficient management" from the Republicans. In another op-ed the same day, Democratic City Committee chairman William J. Green Jr., characterized the Clark administration in more glowing terms and framed the election as a chance for Philadelphians to decide "whether 'good government' shall be extended" in the city after the reforms of 1951.

== City Controller ==
Under the 1951 City Charter, Philadelphia elects a City Controller to sit at the head of an independent auditing department. The Controller approves all payments made out of the city treasury and audits the executive departments. As an independently elected official, the Controller is not responsible to the mayor or the city council. The office was created as one of the good-government reforms intended to reduce the corruption that had previously plagued city government and led to the Democratic-led reform coalition of 1951. The Controller is required to audit the city finances annually and to have his work verified by a private accounting firm every three years.

The 1953 Republican primary for all offices, including Controller, was complicated by a split in the party hierarchy between the "regular" faction, led by Hamilton and Board of Revision of Taxes President William F. Meade; and an insurgent faction led by former Sheriff Austin Meehan. An independent slate of Republicans headed by Treasurer candidate George W. Gibson also contested the primary. In the end, Foster A. Dunlap, a local attorney and the Hamilton-Meade candidate, won with 66,557 votes. Meehan's candidate, former Deputy Secretary of Supplies and Services Wilhelm F. Knauer, polled 50,185, and Gibson's running mate, Rudolph F. Price, tallied just 4,566. On the Democratic side, the party organization was much more unified and real estate agent Roland R. Randall was the easy victor over former State Senator H. Jerome Jaspan, 39,824 to 5,111.

As the election approached, Democratic District Attorney Richardson Dilworth warned of fraud by Republicans. Clark, for his part, reminded city employees of the charter's prohibition on electioneering by civil servants, most of whom were expected to vote Democratic. Dilworth's fears of fraud did not come to pass, but the election for City Controller did go to the Republicans. Dunlap defeated Randall by more than 14,000 votes in a victory Hamilton called a repudiation of "the Clark-Dilworth-ADA combination which has saddled the city with useless debts and experimental government."

Philadelphia City Controller election, 1953
Party	Candidate	Votes	%
Republican	Foster A. Dunlap	282,508	51.29
Democratic	Roland R. Randall	268,299	48.71

== Other row offices ==
The 1951 charter reforms included consolidation of city and county offices. When all of the municipalities in Philadelphia County were consolidated into one city in 1854, the surviving county offices often duplicated the efforts of city offices. The new charter allowed for their consolidation, but litigation ensued about which county offices were actually state offices, and thus immune from the city's jurisdiction. A State Supreme Court case decided in 1953 settled the issue, for the most part, leaving the Register of Wills as an independently elected official.

For Register of Wills, as for City Controller, the Republicans had a primary fight between the Hamilton-Meade regulars and the Meehan faction. As in that contest, the regulars were victorious, nominating Robert C. Duffy, attorney and former football star, with 67,283 votes. In second came Meehan's man, Morris J. Root, with 42,977, and William P. Shermer, an independent candidate, with 8,909. The Democrats had an easier time nominating former internal revenue collector Francis R. Smith, who trounced Joseph F. Amodie, 40,582 to 5,470. The general election contest was one of the closest on the ballot but the Republican, Duffy, still defeated the Democrat by more than 7,500 votes.

Philadelphia Register of Wills election, 1953
Party	Candidate	Votes	%
Republican	Robert C. Duffy	281,654	50.71
Democratic	Francis R. Smith	273,782	49.29

The State Supreme Court decision on citywide elected offices (also called row offices) was silent about the offices of city treasurer and coroner. While some city officials took this to mean that those offices could be converted to civil service positions, the City Commissioners (who were in charge of elections) interpreted the ruling the opposite way. As Democratic Commissioner Thomas P. McHenry said, "we have had no specific law to cover the situation regarding the Treasurer and Coroner's offices." As a result, candidates were allowed to campaign for the two offices, even though it was unclear that the offices would continue to exist.

For both offices, the Republicans nominated regulars. The incumbent treasurer, Francis D. Pastorius, defeated William M. Paschall and Gibson, with 71,364 to Pastorius, 41,244 to Paschall, and 10,464 to Gibson. The Democrats nominated Joseph F. Vogt without opposition, though he had died in April, a month before the May primary. (Vogt's was the only name on the ballot.) In September, the Democratic City Committee nominated State Representative Granville E. Jones in Vogt's place. For coroner, the nominations followed a similar pattern. The Hamilton-Meade faction nominated Edward E. Holloway, who defeated Meehan man Roger J. Soens and independent Vincent E. Costello for the Republican nomination. The Democrats renominated the incumbent, Joseph Ominsky, over challenger Gust G. Tatlas.

Shortly before election day, City Council acted to resolve the ambiguity over the offices by formally abolishing them. The act folded the coroner's office into the Health Department and the treasurer's office into the Finance Department, with informal arrangements for both incumbents to retain jobs in their respective departments as employees. In the general election, Pastorius was reelected to the abolished office, leading the entire ticket with 288,707 votes, nearly 20,000 more than Jones. Holloway also defeated Ominsky by more than 12,000 votes, making a clean sweep for Republicans.

After the election, Pastorius and Holloway announced plans for a lawsuit challenging the abolition of their offices. Pastorius claimed the abolition subverted democracy, saying "[i]f you permit an office to be abolished after the process of election has begun, you open the door to rigged elections." The men took their oaths of office in January 1954 for the terms to which they had been elected, but did not pursue the lawsuits and relinquished the offices the next day.

Philadelphia City Treasurer election, 1953
Party	Candidate	Votes	%
Republican	Francis D. Pastorius	288,707	51.77
Democratic	Granville E. Jones	268,940	48.23

Philadelphia Coroner election, 1953
Party	Candidate	Votes	%
Republican	Edward E. Holloway	283,082	51.13
Democratic	Joseph Ominsky	270,520	48.87

== Judges and magistrates ==
Although Pennsylvania's judges are elected in partisan elections, there had been a tradition of not challenging the re-election of incumbents, or "sitting judges." To that end, judicial candidates were typically endorsed by both major parties. The parties had followed the sitting judge tradition in 1951, but in 1953 the Democrats broke the informal pact and endorsed just three of the sitting judges, all of whom had been elected as Republicans years earlier. The result was an unusually intense contest for the thirteen seats available. There were also eleven seats open for magistrate, a local court, the duties of which are now performed by the Philadelphia Municipal Court. As in the other races, the Republicans triumphed. The three cross-endorsed judges won, as did the six Republican-backed incumbents. Four Republicans were also elected to open seats. In the magistrate elections, the Republicans took seven of the eleven seats, the maximum allowed by one party. James J. Clothier, the chief magistrate and a Republican, led all magistrates in votes.

== Ballot questions ==
Philadelphians saw three ballot questions in the primary election, all of which involved allowing the city to borrow money. The loans, on the ballot at Clark's urging, were designed to allow the city to temporarily increase spending without raising taxes, and were opposed by many ward leaders in both parties. As a result, they went down to unexpected defeat by a 3:2 margin. Undeterred, Clark and his allies revised and relisted the loans for a vote in the general election in November, which would see better turnout and, they believed, a better chance of success.

On the November ballot, the first loan would involve $19 million for parks, libraries, roads, and firehouses. The second authorized borrowing $35,750,000 for sewers and mass transit infrastructure. The third question reorganized the city's existing borrowing to free up $21,650,000 of borrowing power. On the second try, the electorate approved all three loans with 62.07%, 62.39%, and 59.13%, respectively.

== Sources ==
Books

- Bulletin Almanac 1952. Philadelphia, Pennsylvania: The Philadelphia Bulletin. 1952. OCLC 8641470.
- Reichly, James (1959). The Art of Government: Reform and Organization Politics in Philadelphia. New York, New York: Fund for The Republic. OCLC 994205.

Newspapers

- "County Offices to Defy Charter at Primary". The Philadelphia Inquirer. January 20, 1953. pp. 1, 12 – via Newspapers.com.
- "Sitting Judge Policy 'Scrapped' By Democrats; GOP Offers Slate". The Philadelphia Inquirer. March 15, 1953. pp. 1, 12 – via Newspapers.com.
- Rosen, Frank (May 20, 1953). "Two-Party Blow Aimed At Mayor". The Philadelphia Inquirer. pp. 1, 8 – via Newspapers.com.
- Miller, Joseph H. (May 20, 1953a). "Organization Tickets Win Sluggish Primary; Loan Proposals Beaten". The Philadelphia Inquirer. pp. 1, 8 – via Newspapers.com.
- Miller, Joseph H. (May 21, 1953b). "Only 182,000 Voted in Quiet City Primary". The Philadelphia Inquirer. pp. 1, 12 – via Newspapers.com.
- "Another Vote on City Loans Set For Fall". The Philadelphia Inquirer. May 21, 1953. p. 1 – via Newspapers.com.
- "Choice of Doty, Jones Ratified by Board". The Philadelphia Inquirer. September 2, 1953. p. 20 – via Newspapers.com.
- "Council Wipes Out 4 County Offices in 1st Merger Step". The Philadelphia Inquirer. October 16, 1953. pp. 1, 26 – via Newspapers.com.
- Green, William J. (November 1, 1953). "Victory is Predicted by Both Major Parties". The Philadelphia Inquirer. p. 1 – via Newspapers.com.
- Hamilton, William J. (November 1, 1953). "Victory is Predicted by Both Major Parties". The Philadelphia Inquirer. p. 1 – via Newspapers.com.
- Miller, Joseph H. (November 1, 1953c). "Clark Administration Faces Test in Election Tuesday; Project Loans Up For Vote". The Philadelphia Inquirer. pp. 1, 6 – via Newspapers.com.
- Schraga, Saul (November 3, 1953). "Dilworth Accuses GOP of Molinari Vote Plot; Heavy Ballot Urged". The Philadelphia Inquirer. pp. 1, 2 – via Newspapers.com.
- "Single Contest For Judges in Phila". The Philadelphia Inquirer. November 4, 1951. p. 3 – via Newspapers.com.
- Miller, Joseph H. (November 4, 1953d). "Republicans Victors In Phila.; Meyner Defeats Troast in N.J." The Philadelphia Inquirer. pp. 1, 2 – via Newspapers.com.
- "Phila. Vote At A Glance". The Philadelphia Inquirer. November 5, 1953. p. 2 – via Newspapers.com.
- "2 Republicans to File Suit for Abolished Jobs". The Philadelphia Inquirer. December 11, 1953. pp. 1, 28 – via Newspapers.com.
- Feist, William F. (January 5, 1954). "Pastorius 'Quits' Treasurer Post". The Philadelphia Inquirer. p. 3 – via Newspapers.com.

Reports

- Committee of Seventy (1980). "The Charter: A History" (PDF). Philadelphia. Archived from the original (PDF) on October 21, 2016.
- Freedman, Robert L. (1963). A Report on Politics in Philadelphia. Cambridge, Massachusetts: Joint Center for Urban Studies of the Massachusetts Institute of Technology and Harvard University. OCLC 1690059.
