= Czerkasy =

Czerkasy may refer to:

- Cherkasy, Ukraine – Czerkasy in Polish
- Czerkasy, Lublin Voivodeship (east Poland)
