= Foster A. Dunlap =

American lawyer and politician

- Dunlap in 1957

Philadelphia City Controller
- In office 1954–1958
- Succeeded by: Alexander Hemphill

Personal details
- Born: August 26, 1905 Conshohocken, Pennsylvania
- Died: January 23, 1978 (aged 72) Cherry Hill, New Jersey
- Resting place: Saint Peter Evangelical Lutheran Church Cemetery; Lafayette Hill, Pennsylvania
- Party: Republican
- Spouse: Evelyn Gordon
- Children: 2
- Education: Temple University; University of Pennsylvania
- Occupation: Lawyer

Foster Alexander Dunlap (August 26, 1905 - January 23, 1978) was a Republican lawyer and politician from Philadelphia who served as City Controller from 1954 to 1958.

Dunlap was born in Conshohocken, Pennsylvania, in 1905, the son of Alexander and Estella Dunlap. The family moved to North Philadelphia, where Dunlap was raised. He graduated from Temple University and later from that university's law school in 1934. He later studied at the University of Pennsylvania's Wharton School. Dunlap joined the United States Army in World War II and fought in the North Africa campaign. He married Evelyn Gordon, with whom he had two children.

In 1953, Dunlap ran for the Republican nomination for Philadelphia City Controller. The primary was complicated by a split in the party hierarchy between the "regular" faction, led by Republican City Committee chairman William J. Hamilton, and Board of Revision of Taxes President William F. Meade; and an insurgent faction led by former Sheriff Austin Meehan. An independent slate of Republicans headed by Treasurer candidate George W. Gibson also contested the primary. Dunlap was the Hamilton-Meade candidate, and won with 66,557 votes. Meehan's candidate, former Deputy Secretary of Supplies and Services Wilhelm F. Knauer, polled 50,185, and Gibson's running mate, Rudolph F. Price, tallied just 4,566.

In the general election, Dunlap faced Democratic nominee Roland R. Randall. He highlighted the importance of having a Controller from a different party from the mayor, Democrat Joseph S. Clark, Jr., and noted that Clark and his running mate Richardson Dilworth had said the same thing in 1949, when the mayor had been a Republican. Dunlap won with 51% of the vote.

The City Controller sits at the head of an independent auditing department, approves all payments made out of the city treasury, and audits the executive departments. As an independently elected official, the Controller is not responsible to the mayor or the city council and was given expanded powers under the 1951 Charter. Dunlap took office in 1954 and set to work right away in questioning city expenditures that he believed violated procurement policies. He also circulated a questionnaire to city employees asking whether they were members of any "subversive" organizations.

In 1955, at Clark's urging, Dunlap investigated Philadelphia's Traffic Court and found widespread favoritism that he claimed amounted to $1.9 million in fines not being collected. The following year, as Democrats on city council announced plans to amend the 1951 City Charter to allow more political patronage in city jobs, Dunlap voiced his opposition to the plan.

Dunlap was unopposed for renomination in the 1957 election. His vigilance in his duties may have harmed his reelection chances; according to a Philadelphia Inquirer story just before the election, some Republican ward leaders withheld their support for Dunlap because he had investigated corruption of Republican officials. Whatever the reason, he went down to defeat, losing to Democrat Alexander Hemphill. Dunlap returned to his private law practice and moved to Cherry Hill, New Jersey, where he died in 1978. He was buried in Saint Peter Evangelical Lutheran Church Cemetery in Lafayette Hill, Pennsylvania.

== Sources ==
- "1910 United States Federal Census, T624_1408, page 6A". Ancestry.com.
- "Hamilton to Offer Team of New Faces for City Row Offices". The Philadelphia Inquirer. March 15, 1953. p. 1 – via Newspapers.com.
- Miller, Joseph H. (May 20, 1953a). "Organization Tickets Win Sluggish Primary; Loan Proposals Beaten". The Philadelphia Inquirer. pp. 1, 8 – via Newspapers.com.
- Miller, Joseph H. (May 21, 1953b). "Only 182,000 Voted in Quiet City Primary". The Philadelphia Inquirer. pp. 1, 12 – via Newspapers.com.
- "Dunlap Accuses Clark of Switch". The Philadelphia Inquirer. October 14, 1953. p. 21 – via Newspapers.com.
- "Phila. Vote At A Glance". The Philadelphia Inquirer. November 5, 1953. p. 2 – via Newspapers.com.
- "Dunlap Holds Up Ice Rink Funds". The Philadelphia Inquirer. March 7, 1954. p. 14 – via Newspapers.com.
- "Dunlap Issues Subversive Quiz". The Philadelphia Inquirer. August 28, 1954. p. 5 – via Newspapers.com.
- "Dunlap Puts Traffic Fixes at 1.9 Million". The Philadelphia Inquirer. May 1, 1955. p. 1-B – via Newspapers.com.
- Schraga, Saul (January 21, 1956). "GOP Balks at Plan to Rip Charter". The Philadelphia Inquirer. p. 1 – via Newspapers.com.
- Miller, Joseph H. (May 22, 1957a). "Both Organization Slates Win Primary". The Philadelphia Inquirer. pp. 1, 5 – via Newspapers.com.
- Miller, Joseph H. (November 5, 1957b). "GOP Depending on Rivals' Split for Upset Today". The Philadelphia Inquirer. pp. 1, 12 – via Newspapers.com.
- Miller, Joseph H. (November 6, 1957c). "Democrats Take Every Office in City". The Philadelphia Inquirer. pp. 1, 3 – via Newspapers.com.
- Karafin, Harry (December 15, 1957). "City Watchdog's Parting Words: 'Check Those Vouchers'". The Philadelphia Inquirer. pp. 1-B, 27-B – via Newspapers.com.
- Committee of Seventy (1980). "The Charter: A History" (PDF). Philadelphia. Archived from the original (PDF) on 2016-10-21.
- "Dunlap, Foster A., Esq". The Philadelphia Inquirer. January 25, 1978. p. 40 – via Newspapers.com.
