= Emanuel Weinberg =

American politician

Member of the Philadelphia City Council from the 1st District
- In office January 1, 1958 – January 1, 1968
- Preceded by: Thomas I. Guerin
- Succeeded by: Benjamin Curcuruto

Personal details
- Born: October 4, 1901 Czerkasy, Russia
- Died: July 20, 1966 (aged 64) Philadelphia, Pennsylvania
- Party: Democratic
- Spouse: Lena (Feingold) Weinberg
- Children: Allen, Henry, Martin
- Occupation: real estate appraiser

Emanuel Weinberg (October 4, 1901 – July 20, 1966) was a Democratic politician from Philadelphia who served two-and-a-half terms on Philadelphia City Council.

== Biography ==
Weinberg was born in Czerkasy, Russia (now Poland) in 1901, (Note: Although later sources show Weinberg's birthplace as Philadelphia, early censuses and ship manifests list the Russian Empire instead. Most sources give his birth year as 1901, but some also list 1899.) the eldest son of Bernard Weinberg and Cecilia Livatkoff Weinberg. The family emigrated to the Philadelphia in 1904, and several of Weinberg's younger siblings were born in the United States. After initially being rejected for being underweight, he joined the United States Army and fought in France in the First World War. He was wounded in battle by machine gun fire and spent a year recovering from his injuries. After attempting to join the Philadelphia Police Department, he attended Temple University and became involved with local Democratic Party politics. He married the former Lena Feingold in 1926.

After college, Weinberg worked as a real estate appraiser in the inheritance tax section of the State Auditor General's office. In 1939, he was one of three Democrats nominated for City Council in the 1st district, but Republicans took all three available spots in a close election. (Note: The City Council was composed of multimember districts under the 1919 city charter.) Three years later, he was elected Democratic ward leader of the 39th ward. Weinberg was named an assistant state treasurer in 1943. He served as a delegate to the 1952 Democratic National Convention.

In 1953, Weinberg resigned as ward leader in order to remain on the city payroll as the new city charter, passed in 1951, barred municipal employees from political work (his wife became ward leader in his stead). In 1955, Governor George M. Leader appointed him Deputy Secretary of Insurance, a job with no such prohibition. Two years later, Leader fired Weinberg along with several other political appointees who were found, as The Philadelphia Inquirer reported, to have "enjoyed immunity from supervision and control and were permitted to pursue their private enterprises in addition to their State duties."

Despite the scandal, the Democratic party bosses in Philadelphia nominated Weinberg for City Council in the special election called in 1957 for the 1st district seat of Thomas I. Guerin, who died the year before. The nomination drew criticism from reform-minded Democrats, including United States Senator (and former Philadelphia mayor) Joseph S. Clark Jr., who said the nomination showed "contempt for the independent vote." Weinberg's nomination also disappointed Guerin's widow, Mary C. Guerin, who ran as an independent. Guerin noted that Weinberg had been fired from his state job for good reason, saying "one would suppose that Governor Leader did not fire him for being late for work." Despite the split in Democratic support, Weinberg achieved a clear victory over Guerin and their Republican opponent, John Donnelly.

In Council, Weinberg joined Council President James Tate in urging the state to speed up construction of the Delaware Expressway, which would run through his district. In 1959, he ran for a full term on City Council and was elected by nearly a 2:1 margin over his Republican opponent, Nunzio Carto Jr. Weinberg was appointed chairman of the transportation and public utilities committee. He continued his involvement in transportation issues, urging a route option for the Delaware Expressway that would require the demolition of fewer homes. His suggestions were not adopted, and Weinberg was the only dissenting vote when Council gave its approval the state plan in 1962.

In 1963, Weinberg was called to testify in grand jury investigations into graft and bribery in city government. He was nevertheless renominated by the Democrats in the election that year and defeated his Republican opponent, Alvin J. Bello, albeit with a decreased majority.

In 1966, Weinberg was hospitalized with heart problems and announced he would not seek another term on City Council in the next year's election. He died a month later at Einstein Medical Center, and was buried in Shalom Memorial Park in Huntingdon Valley, Pennsylvania. He was survived by his wife Lena and three sons. His son, Marty Weinberg, became a lawyer in Philadelphia and aide to former mayor Frank Rizzo who ran for Mayor of Philadelphia in 1999.

== Sources ==
- "Baltimore, Passenger Lists, 1820–1964". Ancestry.com.
- "City Vote Cast For Candidates". The Philadelphia Inquirer. November 5, 1959. p. 4 – via Newspapers.com.
- "Council Passes Financing Pact For Expressway". The Philadelphia Inquirer. March 30, 1962. p. 31 – via Newspapers.com.
- Critchlow, Paul (February 19, 1978). "Can Mayor Rizzo Win A Third Term? Ask Marty Weinberg". Today: The Inquirer Magazine. pp. 10, 11, 12, 14, 18, 26 – via Newspapers.com.
- "Democratic Slate In 1st District Set". The Philadelphia Inquirer. February 2, 1952. p. 3 – via Newspapers.com.
- "Democrats Unseat One Ward Leader". The Philadelphia Inquirer. June 6, 1942. p. 7 – via Newspapers.com.
- "Emanuel Weinberg Dies; Councilman, 65". The Philadelphia Inquirer. July 21, 1966. p. 32 – via Newspapers.com.
- "5 Republicans Quit Jobs To Keep Ward Posts". The Philadelphia Inquirer. March 5, 1953. p. 10 – via Newspapers.com.
- "Guerin Widow Bids For Council As Independent". The Philadelphia Inquirer. September 21, 1957. p. 12 – via Newspapers.com.
- Miller, Joseph H. (September 21, 1957b). "Clark Adds Blast Against Pair Of Party Nominees". The Philadelphia Inquirer. p. 12 – via Newspapers.com.
- Miller, Joseph H. (June 23, 1959). "$18,000,000 City Bills Pushed in Harrisburg". The Philadelphia Inquirer. p. 33 – via Newspapers.com.
- Miller, Joseph H. (January 23, 1957a). "Leader Fires Torquato Over Plush State Jobs, Orders 23 Others Suspended". The Philadelphia Inquirer. pp. 1, 12 – via Newspapers.com.
- "Pennsylvania, WWI Veterans Service and Compensation Files, 1917–1919, 1934–1948". Ancestry.com.
- "Phila. Election At A Glance". The Philadelphia Inquirer. November 7, 1963. p. 5 – via Newspapers.com.
- "Results of Vote For City Offices". The Philadelphia Inquirer. November 7, 1957. p. 4 – via Newspapers.com.
- "State Maps Change in Delaware Expressway Route". The Philadelphia Inquirer. August 18, 1960. p. 29 – via Newspapers.com.
- Trachtman, Joseph H. (September 28, 1963). "Dilworth Calls Rule in Phila. One Of The Cleanest". The Philadelphia Inquirer. pp. 1, 6 – via Newspapers.com.
- "Vote for City Council". The Philadelphia Inquirer. November 8, 1939. p. 14 – via Newspapers.com.
- "Weinberg Slated For Insurance Post". The Philadelphia Inquirer. January 24, 1955. p. 7 – via Newspapers.com.
- "1910 United States Federal Census, T624_1386, page 6B". Ancestry.com.
- "1920 United States Federal Census, T625_1639, page 35A". Ancestry.com.
