= Francis D. Pastorius =

American politician

Francis Daniel Pastorius, V (October 4, 1920 – April 10, 1962) was a Philadelphia attorney and Republican politician.

Pastorius was born in Scranton, Pennsylvania, in 1920, the son of Henry Clay Pastorius and Ethel Ohoro Pastorius. He was a descendant of the first Francis Daniel Pastorius, the founder of Germantown, Philadelphia, and his family relocated back to Philadelphia when Pastorius was a child. He graduated from William Penn Charter School and Harvard University. He joined the United States Navy during World War II and served aboard USS James O'Hara.

After the war, Pastorius attended the University of Pennsylvania Law School, graduating in 1948. He was active in Republican Party politics in Philadelphia, and in 1952 Governor John S. Fine appointed him city treasurer to fill the unexpired term of Richardson Dilworth, who had been elected district attorney.

City charter reforms that passed in 1951 purported to abolish the office of treasurer, but lawsuits over whether the office was a city office or a state office (and thus immune from the effects of the city charter) lingered into 1953. Pastorius was nominated for a full term in the election that year, but just before the election the Democratic-majority City Council abolished the office, converting the office to a civil service position. Pastorius was elected to the abolished office, leading the entire ticket with 288,707 votes, nearly 20,000 more than Jones.

After the election, Pastorius and city coroner Edward E. Holloway announced plans for a lawsuit challenging the abolition of their offices. He claimed the abolition subverted democracy, saying "[i]f you permit an office to be abolished after the process of election has begun, you open the door to rigged elections." He took his oath of office in January 1954 for the term to which he had been elected, but did not pursue the lawsuit and relinquished the office the next day. Pastorius returned to his law practice, and also served as head of the Cruiser Olympia Association, which saved the historic USS Olympia (C-6) from destruction and turned it into a museum.

In 1962, Pastorius died suddenly following a heart attack at the age of 41. He left no survivors. After a funeral at St. Paul's Episcopal Church in Chestnut Hill, he was buried in Ivy Hill Cemetery.

== Sources ==
- "Council Wipes Out 4 County Offices in 1st Merger Step". The Philadelphia Inquirer. October 16, 1953. pp. 1, 26 – via Newspapers.com.
- "Phila. Vote At A Glance". The Philadelphia Inquirer. November 5, 1953. p. 2 – via Newspapers.com.
- "2 Republicans to File Suit for Abolished Jobs". The Philadelphia Inquirer. December 11, 1953. pp. 1, 28 – via Newspapers.com.
- Feist, William F. (January 5, 1954). "Pastorius 'Quits' Treasurer Post". The Philadelphia Inquirer. p. 3 – via Newspapers.com.
- "Francis D. Pastorius, Ex-City Treasurer, Is Dead at Age of 41". The Philadelphia Inquirer. April 12, 1962. p. 47 – via Newspapers.com.
- "Death of Francis Pastorius in Chestnut Hill". Jim Thorpe Times-News. Jim Thorpe, Pennsylvania. April 12, 1962. p. 1 – via Newspapers.com.
- "Pennsylvania, Veteran Compensation Application Files, WWII, 1950–1966". Ancestry.com. Pennsylvania Historical and Museum Commission. 2015.
