= J. Whyatt Mondesire =

American journalist

J. Whyatt Mondesire (October 14, 1949 – October 4, 2015) was a reporter at The Philadelphia Inquirer during his early career. At the time of his death, he was owner of the Philadelphia Sun newspaper, and was president of the Philadelphia branch of the NAACP for over a decade.

== Biography ==
Jerome Mondesire was born in 1949 to Dominican Jerome Alexis Mondesire, a follower of Marcus Garvey, and Winnifred Taylor Mondesire. He later studied journalism at City College of New York.

During the early 1970s, Mondesire wrote for The Baltimore Sun and later The Philadelphia Inquirer, where he became city desk editor.

In 1980, Mondesire was chosen as chief of staff for Representative William Gray, where he worked until Rep. Gray resigned in 1991. Following this, he founded the Philadelphia Sunday Sun.

In 1996 Mondesire was elected head of the NAACP's Philadelphia branch. Membership increased substantially during his tenure.

In April 2014, Mondesire and 3 board members were suspended by the national NAACP over questions about the use of chapter funds, which were allegedly misdirected to his nonprofit organization, Next Generation CDC. On December 6, Nation of Islam minister Rodney Muhammad was elected as the new president of the Philadelphia NAACP.

Mondesire died on October 4, 2015, at Thomas Jefferson University Hospital in Philadelphia of a brain aneurysm.

== Criticism of Donovan McNabb ==
In December 2005, Mondesire criticized Philadelphia Eagles quarterback Donovan McNabb, calling him, "mediocre at best." He went on to say, "And trying to disguise that fact behind some concocted reasoning that African American quarterbacks who can scramble and who can run the ball are somehow lesser field generals ... is more insulting off the field than on." Mondesire said this after he criticized McNabb for running with the football less. Mondesire also asserted that McNabb shares the blame for Terrell Owens' departure from the team.

McNabb responded by saying, "If you talk about my play, that's one thing. When you talk about my race, now we've got problems. If you're trying to make a name off my name, again, I hope your closet is clean because something is going to come out about you ... I always thought the NAACP supported African Americans and didn't talk bad about them. Now you learn a little bit more."
