= Thomas Jefferson University Hospital =

Major teaching hospital in Philadelphia, Pennsylvania

- Jefferson Health
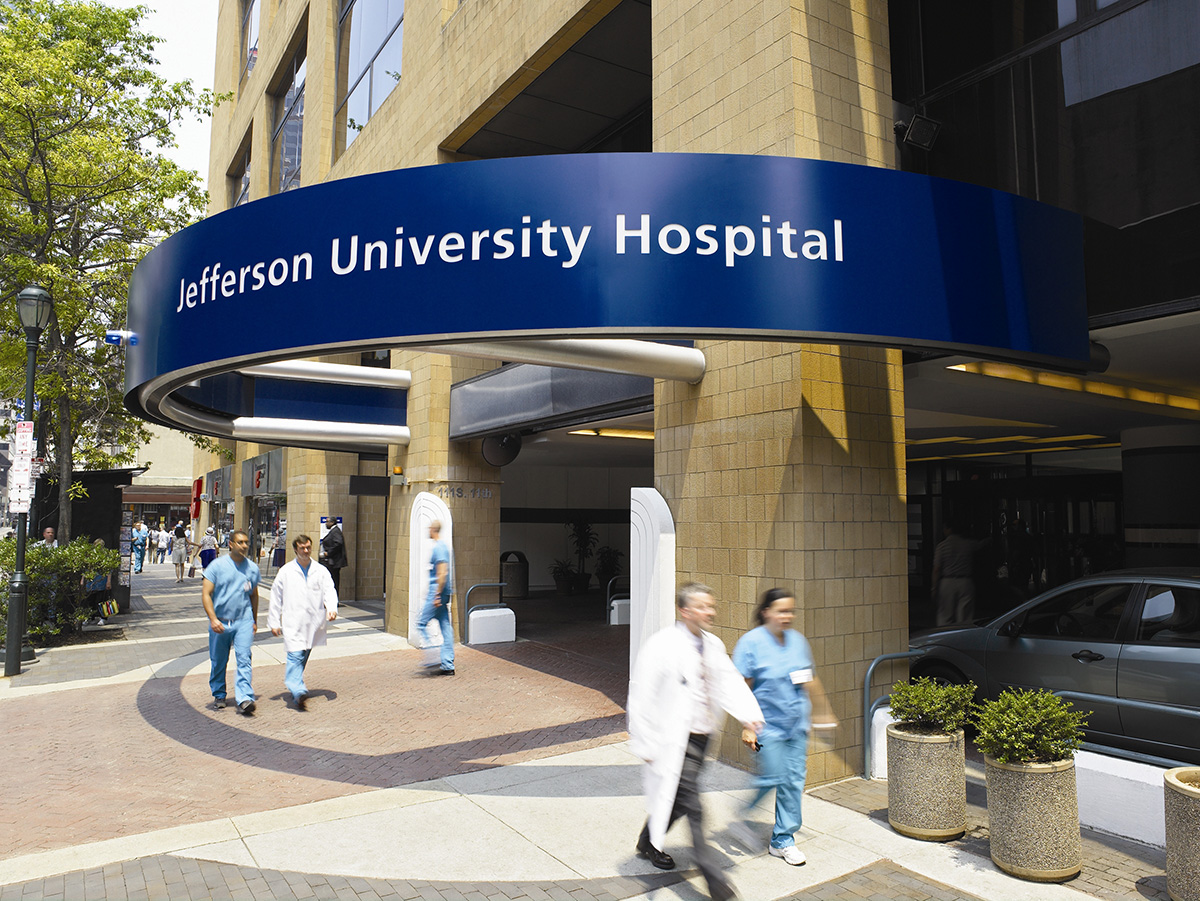
- Thomas Jefferson University Hospital in April 2020

Geography
- Location: Center City, Philadelphia, Pennsylvania, United States
- Coordinates: 39.94911°N 75.15781°W

Services
- Emergency department: Level I trauma center
- Beds: 937

Helipads
- Helipad: (FAA LID: 9PA8)
Number	Length		Surface
Number	ft	m	Surface
H1	40	12	Asphalt

History
- Opened: 1825

Links
- Website: www.jeffersonhealth.org/locations/thomas-jefferson-university-hospital
- Lists: Hospitals in Pennsylvania

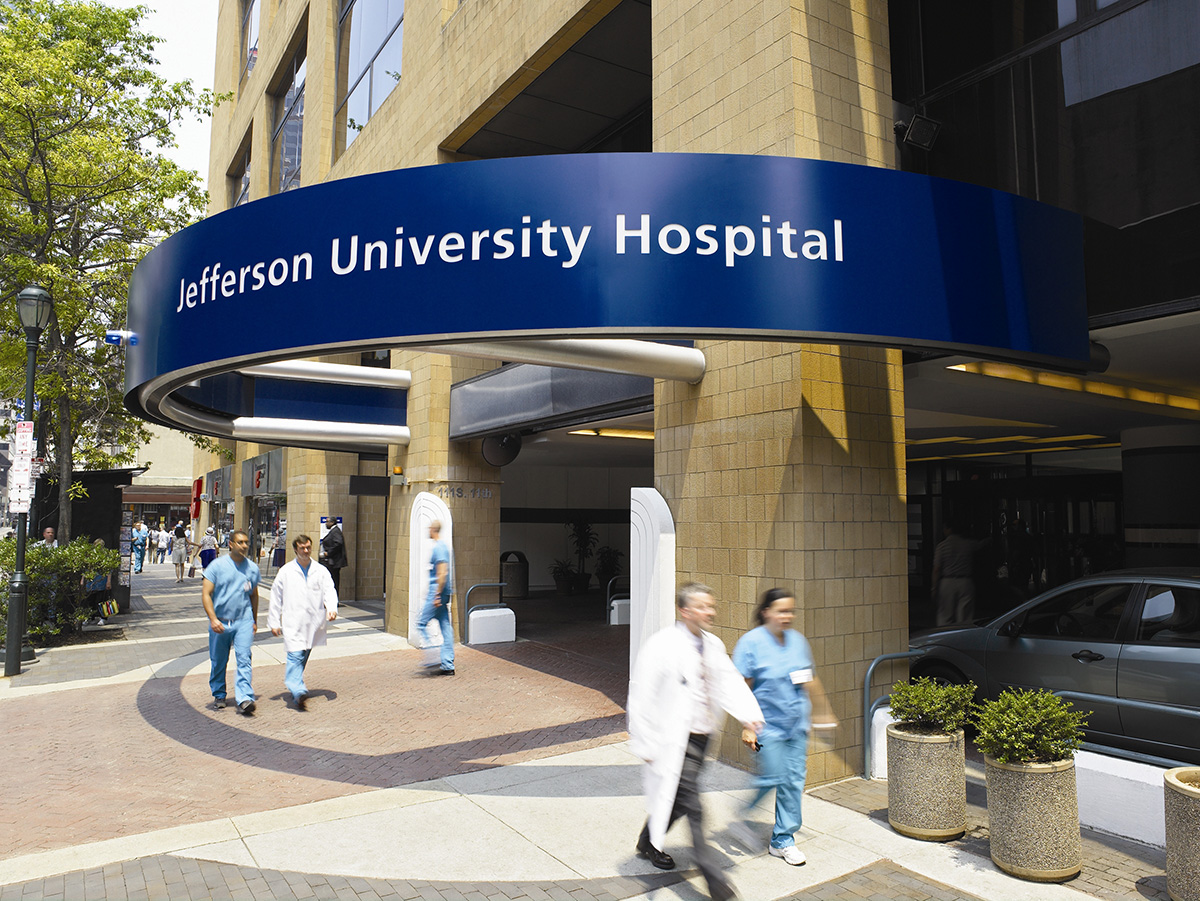
The main entrance to Thomas Jefferson Hospital at 111 S. 11th Street in Center City, Philadelphia

Thomas Jefferson University Hospital is a level 1 trauma center and teaching hospital located in Center City, Philadelphia, Pennsylvania. is the flagship hospital of Jefferson Health, a multi-state non-profit health system based in Philadelphia. The hospital serves as the teaching hospital for Thomas Jefferson University. With 937 licensed beds and 63 operating rooms, it is the second-largest hospital in Pennsylvania as of 2018.

== History ==
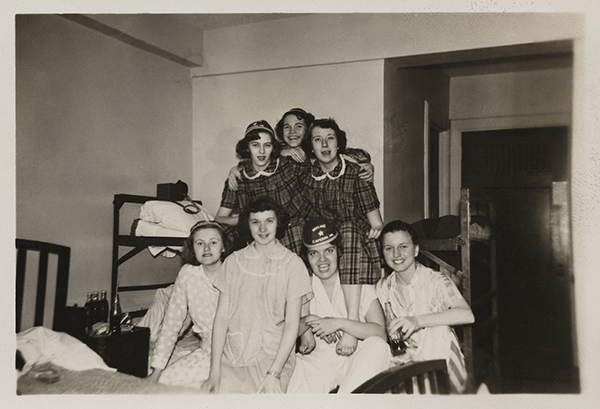
Jefferson Medical College Hospital School of Nursing students in their dorm room, c. 1951

Thomas Jefferson University Hospital was founded in 1825 as the Infirmary of the Jefferson Medical College, the predecessor of the Hospital of Jefferson Medical College. Thomas Jefferson University Hospital serves patients in Philadelphia, the nation's sixth-largest city, and the city's surrounding regions in Delaware, South Jersey, and Pennsylvania.

Thomas Jefferson University Hospitals system has 937 licensed acute care beds. Services are provided at five locations: the main hospital facility and Jefferson Hospital for Neuroscience, both in Center City Philadelphia, Methodist Hospital in South Philadelphia, Jefferson Hospital at the Philadelphia Navy Yard, also in South Philadelphia, and Jefferson-Voorhees Hospital in Voorhees, New Jersey.

== Timeline ==
- 1826: Franklin Bache, a professor of chemistry at Thomas Jefferson University, became the first researcher in the United States to conduct organized studies using acupuncture therapy.
- 1868: Jacob da Silva Solis-Cohen performed the first successful laryngotomy for vocal cord cancer. A laryngotomy is a procedure that involves cutting into the larynx in order to assist respiration when the upper part of the airway has been restricted.
- 1881: William Thomson invented a standard test for color blindness.
- 1953: John H. Gibbon Jr. conceived and developed the world's first successful heart-lung machine, a device that temporarily takes over the function of the heart and lungs during surgery. He also performed multiple open heart surgeries which revolutionized heart surgery in the 20th century.
- 1957: George J. Haupt invented the Jefferson Ventilator while serving as a resident at Thomas Jefferson University Hospital. Haupt developed and patented the mechanical ventilator used during surgeries to inflate the patient's lungs and discharge carbon dioxide accumulated in the blood because the patient could not exhale.
- 1965: Barry B. Goldberg, a professor of radiology at Jefferson Medical College, was deemed a pioneer in ultrasound technology. Ultrasound imaging is a technique that enables the viewing of several body structures including tendons, muscles, joints, and internal organs.
- 1972: Norman Lasker, a professor of medicine at Jefferson Medical College, invented the Jefferson Cycler—the first at-home self-treatment device for kidney dialysis patients. Dialysis is the process of removing waste and excess water from the blood and is used as an artificial replacement for lost kidney function.
- 1982: Charles Klieman developed the modern surgical stapler and the first articulating laparoscopic instrument in 1986. These are scissors that allow surgeons to choose an extremely precise angle of cut.
- 2007: Scott Silvestry and Linda Bogar were the first in Pennsylvania to implant the Jarvik 2000® Heart Assist System to save the life of a cardiac patient.

== Awards and recognition ==
- 2009: Jefferson University Hospital was granted MAGNET recognition for nursing excellence from the American Nurses Credentialing Center's (ANCC). In 2018, Jefferson was recognized for the third time with this honor.
- 2017–2018: U.S. News & World Report ranked Thomas Jefferson University Hospital as the 16th-best hospital in the country. Jefferson was nationally ranked in 11 specialties, placing second-best in the nation in ophthalmology, fourth-best in orthopedics, eighth-best in ear, nose and throat, 17th-best in gastroenterology and GI surgery, 20th-best in cancer, 21st-best in neurology and neurosurgery, 26th-best in diabetes and endocrinology, 27th-best in urology, 38th-best in geriatrics, 41st-best in cardiology and heart surgery, and 48th-best in nephrology.
- 2022-2023: U.S. News & World Report ranked Thomas Jefferson University Hospital as the 3rd-best hospital in Pennsylvania and the 2nd-best hospital in Philadelphia.

== Notable births, hospitalizations, and deaths ==
=== Hospitalizations ===
- Mumia Abu-Jamal (1981)
- Beau Biden (2010)
- Darren Daulton (2013)
- Michael Irvin (1999)
- Zero Mostel (1977)
- Adam Taliaferro (2000)

=== Deaths ===
- Pearl Bailey, August 17, 1990
- Edward Walter Clark Jr., April 4, 1946
- William Guarnere, March 8, 2014
- Parady La, January 9, 2026
- Howard Lanin, April 26, 1991
- Jack Meyer, March 6, 1967
- J. Whyatt Mondesire, October 4, 2015
- David Montgomery, December 2, 2011
- Nizah Morris, December 24, 2002
- George Franklin Pawling, December 2, 1954
- Frank Rizzo, July 16, 1991
- Morton Witkin, April 20, 1973
- John Vukovich, March 8, 2007
- Jay Waldman, May 30, 2003
