= Death of Nizah Morris =

American entertainer (1955–2002)

Nizah Morris (1955 – December 24, 2002) was an American transgender entertainer. On December 22, 2002, Morris suffered a severe head injury from which she did not recover. Morris died on December 24, 2002, at Thomas Jefferson University Hospital, when she was removed from life support. The Philadelphia Police Department's handling of Morris' death sparked protests in the LGBT community and led to several investigations into the police coverup of her death.

== Background ==
Nizah Morris began living as a woman in her early 20s. By December 2002 she had built a life for herself working at her mother's daycare center, performing in the weekly drag show at Bob and Barbara's—a bar in Philadelphia's Center City neighborhood—and practicing Buddhism.

== Injury and death ==
On December 22, Morris attended a party at the Key West Bar at the intersection of Juniper and Chancellor streets in Philadelphia. Morris left the bar at 2:00 a.m., and collapsed outside of the bar due to intoxication. Onlookers formed a group around Morris—who could not stand without assistance and had to be supported, according to witnesses—and waited for paramedics for approximately 20 minutes.

A 6th District police officer arrived, canceled the prior call for paramedics when Morris declined to go to a hospital, and offered her a courtesy ride to a hospital. Morris declined a ride to the hospital and asked to be taken home. Witnesses at the scene reportedly helped her into the police cruiser.

Though Morris lived in the 5000 block of Walnut Street, police officers reported that she asked to be let out at 15th and Walnut streets, left the patrol car, and began walking toward 16th Street.

Minutes later, a passing motorist discovered Morris lying on the sidewalk, bleeding from the right side of her forehead. A call was placed to 911, and a 9th District officer arrived at the scene, but did not call a supervisor or treat the event as a crime.

Morris was transported to Thomas Jefferson University Hospital in critical condition. On December 23, 2002, she was removed from life support, and at 8:30 p.m. on December 24, 2002, Nizah Morris was pronounced dead.

== Aftermath and funeral ==
On December 25, 2002, the Medical Examiner's office classified Morris' death as a homicide. However, the Police Department's homicide unit refused to accept this ruling, classified Morris' death as accidental, and requested a second opinion from a brain-injury specialist.

The following day, Morris' mother—Roslyn Wilkins—was notified of her daughter's death by a detective who informed her, "He's dead." The detective was removed from the case after Wilkins complained about his alleged insensitivity.

On December 27, 2002, family members viewed photographs of Morris' body at the Medical Examiner's office, and expressed concern upon noticing slight indentation marks on her wrists. Morris' mother and sister said medical examiners showed them pictures indicating defensive wounds on her hands.

On December 31, 2002, The Philadelphia Inquirer published the first media account of Morris' death, which referred to her as a "prostitute" in the headline and a "male prostitute" in the body of the story.

Nizah Morris was cremated on January 1, 2003, after a funeral service attended by more than 300 people.

== Questions and controversy ==
In the days after Morris' funeral, questions concerning her death arose among her family members and in the LGBT community. During a meeting on January 7, 2003, with Homicide Captain Charles Bloom, Wilkins learned that her daughter received a courtesy ride from police 20 minutes before she was discovered lying on the sidewalk with a head injury.

Details supplied by police about the moments prior to and following Morris' injury and discovery by a passing motorist conflicted with family members' recollections of Morris, and with witnesses' accounts prior to Morris entering the police car outside of the Key West Bar.

Morris' family doubted she would have accepted a ride from the police, given her fear of them, and questioned why she would ask to be dropped off miles from where she lived. A key witness to the event stated that when she asked Nizah where she lived that it sounded like 15th and Walnut. The message could have been misconstrued because Ms. Morris was incoherent.

A key missing fact is that when after being helped the first time (before the police arrived) was that after the initial help, Nizah was found in the street after a taxi refused her service. The taxi took off with the door open and with such force that this initial fall could have caused damage.

Witnesses who were outside of the Key West Bar said Morris was incapable of standing on her own, and had to be helped into the police car. They doubted that she would have been capable, just minutes later, of getting out of the police car on her own and walking away as police officers reported.

== Second opinion ==
On January 30, 2003, more than a month after Morris' death and the Medical Examiner's assessment that it was a homicide, the homicide division of the police department officially declared Morris' death a homicide. Tests performed by a brain-injury specialist, on samples taken during an initial autopsy, resulted in a finding that her death was due to cerebral injury.

Police initially suggested Morris' death had been accidental, and a police spokesman declined to comment on what led the Medical Examiner to conclude Morris' death was a homicide.

== Contradictions and more questions ==
Contradictions between police accounts and witness accounts, and incomplete compliance with police procedures also aroused concerns that Morris case had been mishandled and the cause of her injury and subsequent death covered up because of her status as an African-American transgender woman.

Many of these contradictions and questions were reported by Timothy Cwiek, a reporter for Philadelphia Gay News, who has followed the story of Morris' story since the first reports of her death. For his investigative reporting on Morris' death, Cwiek was awarded the Society of Professional Journalists Sigma Delta Chi Award.

Relying on Cwiek's investigative work, author Kenneth Lipp of The Daily Beast, summarizes the aftermath of Morris' death in saying: "police and prosecutors hid critical information about what happened. Cops misreported Morris's ride with Skala in official logs; the homicide squad did not accept the medical examiner's determination that she had been killed; and the police department 'lost' her homicide report for eight years. Meanwhile, the district attorney's office refused to give police files to the civilian oversight board reviewing Morris's case. When the DA finally turned over the files, it forced the board to sign a nondisclosure agreement that would keep what they found hidden forever."

Cwiek reported the following contradictions and procedural lapses in the Morris case:

- 2:45 a.m. Police accounts say 6th District officer Elizabeth Skala stopped outside of the Key West Bar and offered Morris a courtesy ride. Witness accounts say that Officer Skala stopped to ask if Morris needed to be taken to a hospital, but Morris "waved off" Officer Skala's offer. Officer Skala denied this first encounter.
- 3:07 a.m. - The first 911 call is placed and an ambulance dispatched to the intersection of Juniper and Chancellor Streets, outside of the Key West Bar. Ninth District Officer Kenneth Novak was also dispatched, with Officer Skala as his back-up. Novak and Skala accepted the assignment to investigate the situation outside of the Key West Bar. Dispatch records show Officer Novak arrived first, but Officer Skala says she arrived first.
- Skala then indicated to Novak that she did not require his assistance with Morris—who, aside from being intoxicated, was over six feet tall and a foot taller than officer Skala. Novack did not place himself back in service for new assignments, but instead tried to catch up with Skala on the courtesy ride, but did not use his police radio to coordinate movements with Skala, and arrived at the scene too late.
- Officer Skala then says she gave Morris a ride home, but thought Morris said she lived at 15th and Walnut streets, where police report Morris asked to get out of the vehicle. According to Officer Skala, the ride lasted four minutes. Her log indicated that it lasted 16 minutes.
- 3:25 a.m. Ninth District Officer Thomas Berry said he offered to help Morris out of the car at 15th and Walnut Streets, but that she did not need his help. Witnesses at the Key West Bar said that Morris was unable to stand on her own and had to be helped into the police car.
- The officers' logs at this point record the incident as a successful hospital run, and do not record Morris leaving the police car at 15th and Walnut streets.
- 3:35 a.m. - A second series of 911 calls takes place when Morris is found at 16th and Walnut streets, injured and unconscious, but breathing. Officer Berry takes control of the scene, and reports the incident as a "DK", police department code for a drunken fall. Officer Berry did not interview the citizen who discovered Morris and stopped to help her. No photographs were taken of the scene, nor was evidence such as Morris' purse and hair brush preserved.
- Berry's incident report said he left the injury scene at 3:35 a.m., but a 911 tape indicates Berry did not leave the scene until 4:05 a.m., as paramedics were placing Morris in the ambulance.
- Officer Novak was assigned to investigate the scene, and accepted the assignment, but no report was filed.
- Citizen witnesses said that no first aid appeared to be offered to Morris, nor were any apparent efforts made to stabilize her head before moving her or placing her in the ambulance. Witnesses also said that before Morris was placed in the ambulance, Officer Berry used Morris' jacket to cover her face, as if to indicate that she was already dead.
- 4:15 a.m. - Hospital records indicate Morris' admission to Thomas Jefferson University Hospital. Records also indicate that the hospital summoned police officers to help identify Morris, whom they suspected was a crime victim, which suggests Morris was delivered to the hospital without being identified.
- Officer Novak was dispatched to the hospital to investigate. Novak calls Officers Berry and Skala to the hospital, where the three again assess the cause of Morris' injury as a drunken fall. No reports are filed concerning the investigation at the hospital.
- Morris remained in the hospital for 64 hours, unidentified. Officer Novak, however, was familiar with Morris due to her previous arrests for offenses related to prostitution. At no point did he identify her to hospital staff. Hospital records show staff efforts to identify Morris, whose fingerprints would have been on file due to her previous arrests.
- Witnesses at the injury scene also identified Morris to Officer Berry by name and her employment at Bob and Barbaras. There is no indication that Officer Berry passed this information to the hospital.
- Morris was removed from life support after 64 hours in the hospital, and her family was informed of her death the following day.

Questions and concerns led to the first of several LGBT community meetings, protests and vigils in response to Morris' death and the police department's handling of the investigation.

In April 2003 the Philadelphia Police Department released an edited version of the 911 recording, which included 3 transmissions between officers Skala, Novak, and Berry. The edited recording started at 3:07 a.m. and ended six minutes later.

The same month, in response to community concern, District Attorney Lynne Abraham launched an investigation of Morris' case, and promised to seek physical evidence, including the related 911 recording. However, the investigation ended in December 2003, without finding Morris' killer. Abraham asked for the public's help to investigate the case further, stated that the three officers in the case acted properly, and cited the courtesy ride given to Morris as a "humanitarian gesture".

In May 2003, Morris' mother, Roselyn Wilkins, filed a complaint with the independent oversight Police Advisory Commission against the Philadelphia Police Department for the "lack of information provided to the family by the Police Department." It would not hold hearings on Wilkins' complaint for three and a half more years (December 2006).

In September 2003 the Center for Lesbian and Gay Civil Rights launched a civil suit against the Key West Bar where Morris became intoxicated, the police officers involved, the emergency technicians and the city of Philadelphia itself. The suit was settled for $250,000 in May 2004.

In December 2003, in response to community pressure, the Police Advisory Commission released dispatch records suggesting that the transmissions on the tape lasted for 49 minutes.

In December 2006 the Police Advisory Commission held hearings on the complaint against the Philadelphia Police Department and their investigation continued slowly over the next year.

In January 2007 the Philadelphia Police Department refused to release an unedited version of the 911 recording. In March 2007 the department agreed to play a complete version of the 911 tape for the Police Advisory Commission.

In November 2007, the Police Advisory Commission completed its investigation. They found that with the exception of Officer Skala, the officers involved had acted properly. Within days, the Philadelphia Police Department advised the Police Advisory Commission that their decision was based on incomplete documents, unbeknownst to the advisory group at the time. The information was uncovered in 2007 when a detective, under oath, was forced to admit that Morris' homicide report had been missing since 2003. Apparently, "the report was not 'found' again until 2011, in the City Hall archives."

In March 2008, the Police Advisory Commission voted to reopen the investigation into Morris' death. The group subpoenaed the records and "fought with District Attorney Lynne Abraham until November for access to evidence" who only agreed to do under the condition that the members of the group sign non-disclosure agreements regarding the contents of the file. The introduction of the nondisclosure agreement ensured that they would be able to release any public report or take any remedial action based on the findings of their investigation, rendering the investigation worthless.

In 2011, under new leadership, the Police Advisory Commission voted yet again to reopen the investigation. The new executive director, Kelvyn Anderson, stated that the "nondisclosure agreement that the 2008 Police Advisory Commission entered into with the DA undermines our effectiveness and credibility as a civilian oversight board and compromises the openness and transparency that is our raison d'être." Calling "the magnitude of mismanagement of the Nizah Morris homicide [to be] staggering," Anderson sent a letter requesting a full investigation from U.S. Attorney Zane Memenger. The letter cites that the Philadelphia Police Department investigation was a "litany of errors" including procedural errors in policing, hospital errors, handling intoxicated persons, record keeping, logging information, document storage, hiding communications, "off-the-record" communiques, missing evidence, and testimony so inconsistent to rise to the level of perjury.

In 2015, The Daily Beast reported that the U.S. Attorney General's office did not respond to the Police Advisory Commission's request for an appropriate and full investigation. Similarly, the Pennsylvania Attorney General Office declined to investigate, "saying the case was not in their jurisdiction." Additionally, the Philadelphia District Attorney's Office refuses an outside review of the evidence in Nizah Morris' homicide, telling The Daily Beast that "the district attorney feels that it is his responsibility to continue to be the sole investigating office in criminal cases."

In 2015, Officer Elizabeth Skala-DiDonato has only received a "verbal reprimand" despite the Police Advisory Commission's finding that she "blatantly and methodically" lied about her interactions with Morris on the night of her homicide. "She was transferred from street duty not long after Morris was killed, and reportedly works in the commissioner's office."

== Morris Home ==
In 2011, Philadelphia opened an addiction treatment center for transgender Philadelphians, named The Morris Home for Trans and Gender-Variant People after her. The Morris Home for Trans and Gender-Variant People "is the only inpatient facility of its kind in the United States to [be] operated by the transgender people to specifically focus on transgender people."

== See also ==
- Violence against LGBT people
