= Earl Chudoff =

American politician (1907–1993)

Member of the U.S. House of Representatives from Pennsylvania's 4th district
- In office January 3, 1949 – January 5, 1958
- Preceded by: Franklin J. Maloney
- Succeeded by: Robert N. C. Nix Sr.

Member of the Pennsylvania House of Representatives
- In office 1941–1948

Personal details
- Born: November 15, 1907 Philadelphia, Pennsylvania
- Died: May 17, 1993 (aged 85)
- Party: Democratic

Earl Chudoff (November 15, 1907 – May 17, 1993) was an American lawyer and jurist who served five terms as a Democratic member of the U.S. House of Representatives from Pennsylvania from 1949 to 1958.

== Early life and career ==
Earl Chudoff was born in Philadelphia, Pennsylvania. He graduated from the Wharton School of the University of Pennsylvania in economics in 1929 and from the University of Pittsburgh School of Law in 1932.

He worked as a building and loan examiner for the Pennsylvania State Department of Banking from 1936 to 1939.

=== World War II ===
He served as chief boatswain's mate in the United States Coast Guard Reserve from December 1942 to September 1945.

== Political career ==
He was a member of the Pennsylvania State House of Representatives from 1941 to 1948.

=== Congress ===
Chudoff was elected as a Democrat to the Eighty-first Congress, defeating incumbent Republican Congressman Franklin J. Maloney, and was re-elected to the four succeeding Congresses, beginning on January 3, 1949.

He resigned on January 5, 1958, having been elected judge of the Pennsylvania Courts of Common Pleas No. 1 (defeating the incumbent, Joseph L. Kun in the 1957 election). He served in that capacity until his resignation in 1974.

== Death ==
He died in Philadelphia in 1993.

== See also ==
- List of Jewish members of the United States Congress

U.S. House of Representatives
Preceded by Franklin J. Maloney	Member of the U.S. House of Representatives from Pennsylvania's 4th congressional district 1949–1958	Succeeded by Robert N. C. Nix Sr.
