= Alexander Hemphill =

American politician (1921–1986)

- Hemphill in 1967

Philadelphia City Controller
- In office January 6, 1958 – January 31, 1967
- Preceded by: Foster A. Dunlap
- Succeeded by: Tom Gola

Personal details
- Born: May 22, 1921 West Chester, Pennsylvania
- Died: January 30, 1986 (aged 64) Chestnut Hill, Philadelphia
- Resting place: Oaklands Cemetery
- Party: Democratic
- Education: University of Pennsylvania

Alexander Hemphill (May 22, 1921 – January 30, 1986) was a Democratic lawyer and politician from Philadelphia who served as City Controller from 1958 to 1968. After service in World War II and graduation from the University of Pennsylvania Law School, Hemphill embarked on a legal career before running for office. In his three terms as city controller, he exposed corruption and malfeasance, often to the discomfort of his fellow Democrats. He ran for mayor of Philadelphia in 1967 against the incumbent Democrat, James Tate, but was unsuccessful, and retired to a private law practice until his death in 1986.

== Early life and education ==
Hemphill was born in West Chester, Pennsylvania, in 1921. He was the eldest child of John M. Hemphill and his wife, Anne Price Hemphill. He was born into a politically prominent family, members of which served for seven generations as Chester County Democratic Party chairmen. Hemphill's father, a lawyer, was the Democratic nominee for governor in 1930. Their ancestor, Joseph Hemphill, was a congressman and one of the founders of the Democratic Party.

He attended high school at St. Andrew's School in Delaware before enrolling at the University of Pennsylvania, where he was president of the freshman class and a player on the varsity soccer team. Hemphill's time at Penn coincided with World War II, and he left school to join the war effort, first in the Marines and later in the Navy. After the war, he returned to Penn to finish his bachelor's degree and, in 1949, a law degree. While still in school in 1945, he married Jean Calves, with whom he had eight children.

After receiving his law degree, Hemphill began practicing law while also becoming involved in Philadelphia's burgeoning political reform movement. Joining with former Republicans Joseph S. Clark and Richardson Dilworth, he worked to bring about a Democratic victory in the city's 1951 municipal election in a coalition that united independent reformers with the Democratic organization. In 1954, Clark, now mayor, convinced the Democratic City Committee chairman William J. Green Jr., to back Hemphill's nomination for the United States House of Representatives from the 6th district. He lost the election, narrowly, to the incumbent Republican, Hugh Scott.

== City Controller ==
He was more successful in 1957 when he was the consensus pick for the Democratic nomination for City Controller. The City Controller sits at the head of an independent auditing department, approves all payments made out of the city treasury, and audits the executive departments. As an independently elected official, the Controller is not responsible to the mayor or the city council and was given expanded powers under the 1951 Charter. With the party united behind him, Hemphill defeated the incumbent Republican, Foster A. Dunlap, by thirteen percentage points and took office on January 6, 1958. Although he entered office as an ally of Dilworth, Hemphill's frequent investigations into the conduct of city officials soured the relationship, which grew into an open feud. As Tom Fox of The Philadelphia Inquirer later wrote, Hemphill "wanted everyone to clean up the act—including fellow reformers."

In 1961, Hemphill launched an investigation into political corruption surrounding the bidding on contracts to reconstruct the Market–Frankford Elevated Line. Republicans demanded that a grand jury be convened to investigate further, but Judge Raymond Pace Alexander (who had served as a Democratic city councilman from 1952 to 1960) rejected their petition. In the election that year, the voters made their dissatisfaction known as the Democrats won but all had reduced majorities. Hemphill was not spared from the backlash, but was still returned to office with a nine-percentage-point victory over Republican Joseph C. Bruno.

After his reelection, Hemphill continued to probe corruption in city government. He also launched an investigation into kickbacks in the Streets Department in 1962. Dilworth, who had previously called Hemphill a "pious phony," encouraged the Controller's investigations before resigning as mayor to run for governor. By 1962, Judge Joseph E. Gold agreed to convene a grand jury over the Frankford El scandal, and the investigation grew to encompass similar financial irregularities at the Philadelphia Gas Works; two city councilmen were indicted.

Hemphill considered retiring from office in 1965, saying that "two terms is enough," but ultimately acceded to a draft by Democratic ward leaders for one more term. He was reelected in that year's election, defeating Republican James R. Cavanaugh, as expected by political pundits, even as the Democratic district attorney went down to defeat the same day. He spent much his third term arguing with City Council over their attempt to borrow $20 million for the Gas Works in a procedure that Hemphill claimed lacked the necessary financial safeguards.

== Mayoral candidacy and retirement ==
As his criticisms of city government under Mayor James Tate mounted, Hemphill began to consider a run for the mayor's office in 1967. In a June 1966 interview, Hemphill said of Tate: "I don't think the Mayor is a bad man, and I don't think he would knowingly harm anyone. But I do think he is inept in his handling of many matters." On December 6 of that year, he announced his intention to seek the Democratic nomination in the May 1967 primary. Republican organization leader William A. Meehan suggested publicly that if Hemphill wished to run as a Republican instead, that the party would welcome him. Hemphill chose to remain with the Democratic Party and resigned his office to enter the race on January 30, 1967.

In March, the Democratic City Committee, led by Francis R. Smith, endorsed Hemphill over the incumbent Tate. As the primary drew near, however, organized labor got behind Tate and slowly swayed ward leaders to defy the party bosses and back Tate. In the May primary, Tate defeated Hemphill by 72,000 votes.

Hemphill vowed never to run for public office again, but he did later make several bids for city council, all unsuccessful. He returned to a private law practice and was active on the boards of several charitable organizations. In 1986, Hemphill died suddenly at the age of 64 while at work in his law office. After a funeral at Our Mother of Consolation Church in Chestnut Hill, he was buried at Oaklands Cemetery near West Chester.

== Sources ==
Books

- Bulletin Almanac 1958. Philadelphia, Pennsylvania: The Philadelphia Bulletin. 1958. OCLC 8641470.
- Bulletin Almanac 1962. Philadelphia, Pennsylvania: The Philadelphia Bulletin. 1962. OCLC 8641470.
- Clark, Joseph S.; Clark, Dennis J. (1982). "Rally and Relapse: 1946–1968". In Weigley, Russell (ed.). Philadelphia: A 300-Year History. New York, New York: W.W. Norton & Co. pp. 649–703. ISBN 0-393-01610-2.
- Dubin, Michael J. (1998). United States Congressional elections, 1788–1997: the official results of the elections of the 1st through 105th Congresses. Jefferson, North Carolina: McFarland & Co. ISBN 978-0-7864-0283-0.
- Freedman, Robert L. (1963). A Report on Politics in Philadelphia. Cambridge, Massachusetts: Joint Center for Urban Studies of the Massachusetts Institute of Technology and Harvard University. OCLC 1690059.

Newspapers

- "Weddings of Interest to Society: Hemphill-Calves". The Philadelphia Inquirer. December 28, 1945. p. 19 – via Newspapers.com.
- Miller, Joseph H. (March 13, 1954). "Clark, Green, agree on Hemphill for Race". The Philadelphia Inquirer. p. 10 – via Newspapers.com.
- Miller, Joseph H. (May 22, 1957). "Both Organization Slates Win Primary". The Philadelphia Inquirer. pp. 1, 5 – via Newspapers.com.
- Cummings, John M. (June 13, 1961). "Curtain of Silence on City Scandals". The Philadelphia Inquirer. p. 18 – via Newspapers.com.
- "City Hall's 'Hair Shirt'". The Philadelphia Inquirer. January 18, 1962. p. 5 – via Newspapers.com.
- "Ex-City Aide Accused of Accepting Payola". The Philadelphia Inquirer. May 23, 1962. p. 45 – via Newspapers.com.
- McAdams, Leonard J. (October 20, 1963). "The Philadelphia Grand Jury Story: How It Began". The Philadelphia Inquirer. p. 101 – via Newspapers.com.
- Miller, Joseph H. (March 6, 1965a). "Democrats Slate Crumlish, Urge Draft of Hemphill". The Philadelphia Inquirer. p. 5 – via Newspapers.com.
- Miller, Joseph H. (October 9, 1965b). "The Voters Will Deliver Their Verdict on Tuesday". The Philadelphia Inquirer. p. 14 – via Newspapers.com.
- Miller, Joseph H. (November 3, 1965c). "Controller Gains Third Term on Split Ballots". The Philadelphia Inquirer. p. 1 – via Newspapers.com.
- Keith, C. Allen (March 30, 1966). "Soliciitor Plans Action to Force Public Vote on Gas Plant Measure". The Philadelphia Inquirer. p. 45 – via Newspapers.com.
- "Hemphill May Run For Mayor in 1967". The Philadelphia Inquirer. June 27, 1966. p. 4 – via Newspapers.com.
- McDonough, Donald A. (December 2, 1966). "Hemphill Will Seek Nomination for Mayor". The Philadelphia Inquirer. pp. 1, 16 – via Newspapers.com.
- "Meehan Opens Door For Hemphill as GOP Candidate for Mayor". The Philadelphia Inquirer. December 7, 1966. p. 6 – via Newspapers.com.
- McDonough, Donald A.; McAdams, Leonard J. (February 1, 1967). "Hemphill Quits, Enters Mayor Race". The Philadelphia Inquirer. pp. 1, 10 – via Newspapers.com.
- Miller, Joseph H. (March 11, 1967a). "Democrats To 'Dump' Tate, Swing Behind Hemphill". The Philadelphia Inquirer. pp. 1, 11 – via Newspapers.com.
- Miller, Joseph H. (May 17, 1967b). "Tate Wins By 72,000, Charter Reform OKd; School and Stadium Loans Are Approved". The Philadelphia Inquirer. pp. 1, 5 – via Newspapers.com.
- Fox, Tom (April 17, 1975). "Loser Assails Political Ways". The Philadelphia Inquirer. p. 1-B – via Newspapers.com.
- "Alexander Hemphill, 64; served as City Controller". The Philadelphia Inquirer. January 31, 1986. p. 17-C – via Newspapers.com.
- Fox, Tom (February 5, 1986). "Hemphill sniffed out wrongdoing". The Philadelphia Inquirer. p. 13-A – via Newspapers.com.

Report

- Committee of Seventy (1980). "The Charter: A History" (PDF). Philadelphia. Archived from the original (PDF) on 2016-10-21.
