= Joseph Ominsky =

American lawyer and politician

Joseph Ominsky (September 20, 1901 – September 14, 2000) was an American lawyer and politician.

Born near Kyiv, Russian Empire, Ominsky graduated from Southern High School in 1919. He graduated from Drexel University in 1921. In 1925, Ominsky received his bachelor's degree in economics from Wharton School of the University of Pennsylvania. In 1930, Ominsky received his law degree from Temple University Beasley School of Law. He practiced law in Philadelphia, Pennsylvania, and was involved with the Democratic Party. From 1935 to 1941, Ominsky served in the Pennsylvania House of Representatives. From 1944 to 1946, Ominsky was a special attorney for the United States War Fraud Department. In 1952, Ominsky was elected coroner for Philadelphia County, Pennsylvania and then was appointed chief medical examiner for Philadelphia County. In 1959 and 1960, Ominsky served as chief clerk of the Pennsylvania House of Representatives. He died of heart failure in Philadelphia, Pennsylvania.
