= Austin Meehan =

American politician (1897–1961)

Sheriff of Philadelphia
- In office January 3, 1944 – January 7, 1952
- Succeeded by: William M. Lennox

Personal details
- Born: August 29, 1897 Philadelphia, Pennsylvania, U.S.
- Died: October 5, 1961 (aged 64) Philadelphia, Pennsylvania, U.S.
- Resting place: Holy Sepulchre Cemetery, Cheltenham Township, Pennsylvania, U.S.
- Party: Republican
- Spouse: Jane McNulty
- Children: 8, including Billy Meehan

Austin Andrew Meehan, Sr., (August 29, 1897 – October 5, 1961) was a Republican politician in Philadelphia who served as county sheriff. Before entering politics, Meehan ran his family's paving business and was known as a local basketball star. Beginning as an insurgent within the city's Republican Party, he soon won the favor of party bosses and climbed the ranks of Philadelphia's Republican organization. Meehan served two terms as county sheriff from 1944 to 1952 and was recognized as the unofficial head of the Republican Party in Philadelphia in the 1950s. He remained an influential party member until his death in 1961. He was the father of Billy Meehan.

== Early life ==
Meehan was born in 1897 in Philadelphia, the son of John Meehan and Anna Waldron Meehan. Meehan's parents were Irish immigrants, and he grew up in North Philadelphia's 37th ward. In 1917, he married Jane McNulty, with whom he would later have four sons and four daughters. From the age of 14, Meehan worked for his father, a paving contractor with his own increasingly successful business.

Meehan played on some of the early professional basketball teams around the city, including the Philadelphia 50 Club, St. Henry, and Shanahan. Local sports writers awarded Meehan the credit for Shanahan's defeat of the city's dominant team, the SPHAs, in 1925. After his basketball career ended, he became involved with charity work in Northeast Philadelphia, including sponsoring youth sports. Financial success from his contracting business gave him independence, and Meehan entered politics at an early age, often sparring with the Republican Party establishment in the city.

== Insurgent candidate ==
In 1935, Democratic governor George H. Earle appointed Meehan to one of the Republican slots on the city's voter registration committee. Meehan immediately found himself at odds with the party organization, saying later that year that the "dead heads" (Note: Here, Meehan uses "deadhead" in the earlier sense of the word, a synonym for "dullard". See definition #6 here.) in the party must be removed from power if they hoped to win the election that year. He soon broke with councilman Clarence K. Crossan, who had supported him for the job, and considered a run for sheriff or for Crossan's seat on city council. Meehan and Crossan later reconciled, but Meehan bucked the party by throwing his support to John B. Kelly Sr., the Democratic candidate for mayor.

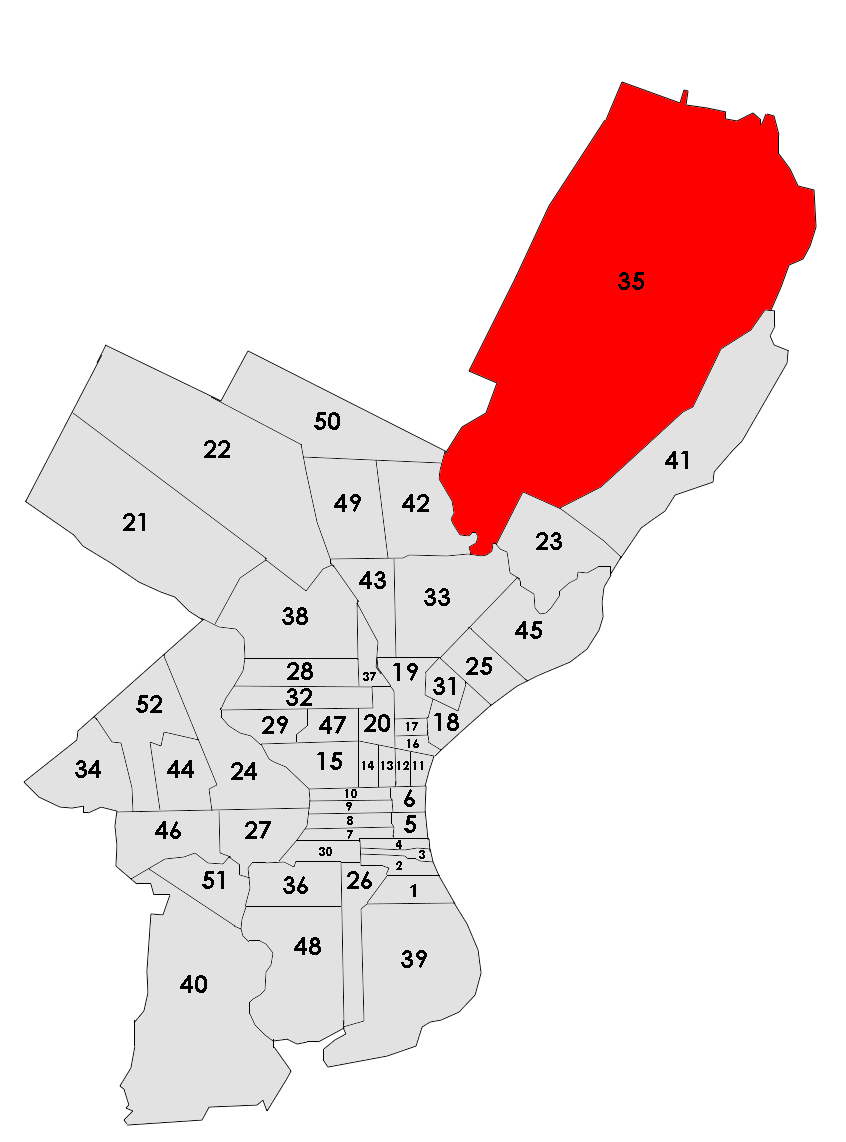
The 35th ward was the base of Meehan's political power.

Kelly lost the 1935 election, and Meehan resigned his seat on the registration committee. Meehan never again backed a Democrat for office, but he remained a thorn in the side of the Republican party regulars. In 1937, he ran for city treasurer against the organization-backed candidate, David E. Watson (though with the backing of Republican Mayor Samuel Davis Wilson). Meehan lost by a two-to-one margin in the primary. After publicly toying with leaving the party, Meehan backed Watson and the rest of the Republican slate in the general election that November.

Meehan, by this time elected the leader of the 35th Ward Republicans, continued his independent streak into the early 1940s. In 1941, he ran for the Republican nomination for city controller. Meehan represented the so-called "insurgent Republicans" against the party hierarchy, but he also had the support of United States Senator James J. Davis. He was unsuccessful again, losing to Alvin A. Swenson, but he tallied more votes than any of the other insurgents, with 73,135 to Swenson's 124,327. His growing popularity meant the organization could no longer treat Meehan as a mere nuisance.

== Sheriff ==
In 1943, David W. Harris, the head of the Republican City Committee, approached Meehan about running for sheriff with the organization's backing. John M. Cummings of The Philadelphia Inquirer called the development "encouraging," writing that Meehan's business acumen, community work, and civic-mindedness would make him a "tower of strength" on the November ballot. Meehan was unopposed in the primary and won easily in the general election that fall, defeating Democrat Elmer Kilroy by more than 40,000 votes.

Although he had come to office as an outsider, allegations of insider corruption were made about Meehan. Similar accusations about the entire Republican organization led many independent voters to shift toward the opposition. The Democratic candidate for mayor, Richardson Dilworth, accused Meehan of controlling illegal gambling in Northeast Philadelphia, among other crimes. In response to his repeated accusations, Meehan challenged Dilworth to a televised debate. Meehan was later persuaded that it would be a mistake to debate Dilworth, a skilled trial lawyer, and backed out; but Dilworth went on without him, haranguing an empty chair instead. Meehan was, nonetheless, reelected in 1947 with a 100,000-vote majority. It would be the last election the Republicans would dominate in the city.

== Party boss ==
=== Decline of the Philadelphia Republicans ===
With the death of Thomas Sovereign Gates in 1948, the last of the "old Philadelphia" upper-class leadership of the Republican Party was gone. That left Meehan, William F. Meade, and Morton Witkin as the remaining powers in the party organization. Meehan's wealth gave him some advantage over the other two, but none of the three was strong enough to control the entire organization, and intra-party feuding was often the result—as was an increase in "indiscriminate graft," according to author James Reichley. By this time, Meehan's contracting business was more successful, as well, as it received contracts for much of the city's street paving.

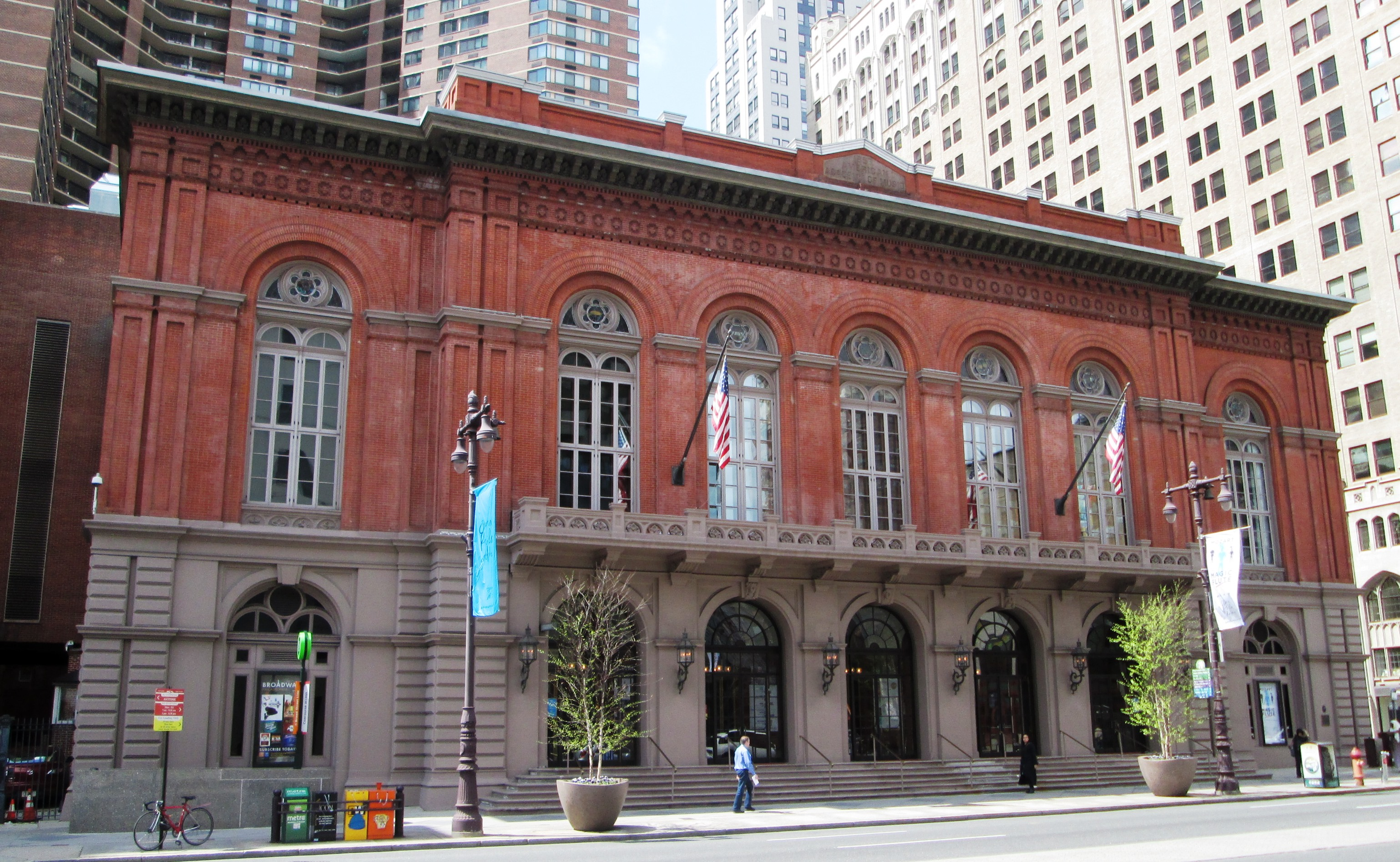
The Academy of Music was the site of Meehan and Dilworth's 1949 debate.

In 1949, the Democrats, led by Dilworth and city controller candidate Joseph S. Clark Jr., mounted another campaign focused on corruption. Dilworth claimed that Meehan was bribed by the local utility companies, though he did not present any evidence of the charge. Meehan dismissed the two Democrats as "Dilly and Silly". He and Meade drew attention to the Americans for Democratic Action, a left-wing group that backed the Democratic ticket, which Meade said was "infiltrated with communists." This time, Meehan and Dilworth did debate before a packed house at the Academy of Music, as well as over the air on radio and television. The debate soon turned to an exchange of insults, with the personal morals of both politicians being criticized. Unlike in 1947, the Democrats won all of the races on the ballot by 100,000-vote majorities.

After the defeat, relations worsened between Meehan and Meade, leading to an open split by 1950. Dilworth and Clark ran again in 1951—this time for district attorney and mayor, respectively—and painted Meehan and his associates as irredeemably corrupt while endorsing the recently approved city charter. The campaign was successful and led reform-minded voters to abandon the Republican Party, resulting in sweeping losses in the 1951 mayoral and council races. The Democrats won nearly every election on the ballot in 1951, including sheriff. Meehan did not run for a third term.

=== Head of the party ===
The 1953 elections saw Meade and Meehan enter rival slates in the primaries, with Meade's faction coming out on top. Meehan backed the primary victors in the general election, and the result was a surprise victory in the city controller and register of wills offices that were on the ballot that year. After the election, Meade joined with the Hamilton brothers of Roxborough's 23rd ward to place William Hamilton Jr. at the head of the city committee. However, Meade and Meehan soon both tired of Hamilton, and replaced him with the newly elected register of wills, Robert C. Duffy. By 1954, they were again at odds over the distribution of federal patronage.

The 1955 election saw a return to bad fortune for the Republicans as Dilworth succeeded Clark as mayor. The next year, Meehan backed David E. Watson—against whom he had run in the primary for city treasurer in 1937—for city committee chair; Watson defeated Duffy, who was Meade's choice for reelection. Watson died four months later, but Meehan's choice of Wilbur H. Hamilton prevailed. In 1957 Meehan, by then the predominant force in Philadelphia Republican politics, resigned as leader of the 35th ward and John F. Kane (Meehan's son-in-law) was elected in his place.

In 1959, Meehan's choice for mayoral nominee, former Minnesota governor Harold Stassen, was selected in the primary, but he lost overwhelmingly to Dilworth. He was selected to head the Pennsylvania delegation to the 1960 Republican National Convention, but increasingly came under attack from independent Republicans who wanted a change from "bossism."

== Death and legacy ==
While speaking to the Northeast Lions Club in October 1961, Meehan suffered a heart attack. He was taken to Holy Redeemer Hospital, but died without regaining consciousness. 50,000 people turned out for his viewing before a funeral Mass at Presentation of the Blessed Virgin Mary Roman Catholic church in Lawndale. He was buried in Holy Sepulchre Cemetery in Cheltenham.

Meehan's memory would be revered among Philadelphia Republicans for years to come, and many would recall his mix of friendliness and political acumen. Austin Meehan Middle School in Northeast Philadelphia was named for him at the behest of his one-time rival, Richardson Dilworth. Meehan's son Billy followed in his father's footsteps to become the informal head of the party in Philadelphia.

== Sources ==
Books

- Binzen, Peter; Binzen, Jonathan (2014). Richardson Dilworth: Last of the Bare-Knuckled Aristocrats. Philadelphia, Pennsylvania: Camino Books. ISBN 978-1-933822-86-0.
- Crumlish, Joseph D. (1959). A City Finds Itself: the Philadelphia Home Rule Charter Movement. Detroit, Michigan: Wayne State University Press. OCLC 491418011.
- Freedman, Robert L. (1963). A Report on Politics in Philadelphia. Cambridge, Massachusetts: Joint Center for Urban Studies of the Massachusetts Institute of Technology and Harvard University. OCLC 1690059.
- Reichley, James (1959). The Art of Government: Reform and Organization Politics in Philadelphia. New York, New York: Fund for the Republic. OCLC 994205.

Journals

- Madonna, G. Terry; McLarnon, John Morrison (January 2003). "Reform in Philadelphia: Joseph S. Clark, Richardson Dilworth and the Women Who Made Reform Possible, 1947–1949". The Pennsylvania Magazine of History and Biography. 127 (1): 57–88. JSTOR 20093600.

Newspapers

- "Shanahan Passers Eliminate SPHAs". The Philadelphia Inquirer. March 12, 1925. p. 27 – via Newspapers.com.
- "Eastern Title May Hinge on Last Tilt". The Philadelphia Inquirer. March 16, 1931. p. 15 – via Newspapers.com.
- "Cox Seeks Re-election as G.O.P. City Leader". The Philadelphia Inquirer. March 15, 1935. p. 27 – via Newspapers.com.
- Miller, Joseph H. (July 27, 1935). "Council Seats Stir War Among City GOP". The Philadelphia Inquirer. p. 2 – via Newspapers.com.
- Cummings, John M. (September 15, 1937). "The Political Battlefront: Republican". The Philadelphia Inquirer. p. 1 – via Newspapers.com.
- "Meehan Backs G.O.P. Ticket". The Philadelphia Inquirer. October 27, 1937. p. 32 – via Newspapers.com.
- "Meehan Indorsed For City Controller by Senator Davis". The Philadelphia Inquirer. September 5, 1941. p. 2 – via Newspapers.com.
- "Swenson Rolled Up 51,192 Vote Margin". The Philadelphia Inquirer. September 26, 1941. p. 48 – via Newspapers.com.
- Cummings, John M. (May 28, 1943). "'43 Elections Will Bear Watching for '44 Trends". The Philadelphia Inquirer. p. 25 – via Newspapers.com.
- Miller, Joseph H. (November 4, 1943). "Council Race Is Close in West Phila. District". The Philadelphia Inquirer. p. 12 – via Newspapers.com.
- Miller, Joseph H. (November 5, 1947a). "Samuel Wins By 93,000". The Philadelphia Inquirer. p. 1 – via Newspapers.com.
- Miller, Joseph H. (September 27, 1947b). "Police Inspector Denies 'Kick-In' to Meehan". The Philadelphia Inquirer. p. 5 – via Newspapers.com.
- Miller, Joseph H. (May 20, 1953a). "Organization Tickets Win Sluggish Primary; Loan Proposals Beaten". The Philadelphia Inquirer. pp. 1, 8 – via Newspapers.com.
- Miller, Joseph H. (November 4, 1953b). "Republicans Victors In Phila.; Meyner Defeats Troast in N.J." The Philadelphia Inquirer. pp. 1, 2 – via Newspapers.com.
- "J.F. Kane Elected to Meehan Post". The Philadelphia Inquirer. January 15, 1957. p. 3 – via Newspapers.com.
- Greenberg, Robert I. (October 6, 1961). "Austin Meehan Dies at 64; Leader in State, City GOP". The Philadelphia Inquirer. pp. 1, 3 – via Newspapers.com.
- "Two Hobbies—Friends, Politics". The Philadelphia Inquirer. October 6, 1961. p. 3 – via Newspapers.com.
- Infield, Tom (January 13, 1987). "Cherishing the Memory of GOP's 'Sheriff'". The Philadelphia Inquirer. p. 14 – via Newspapers.com.

Websites

- "1910 United States Federal Census, T624_1407, page 3B". Ancestry.com.
- "Philadelphia, Pennsylvania, Marriage Index, 1885–1951". Ancestry.com.
- "Pennsylvania, Death Certificates, 1906–1966". Ancestry.com.
- "William Austin Meehan Oral History". Walter Massey Phillips Oral Histories. Temple University Special Collections Oral Histories Repository. March 23, 1977. Archived from the original on October 4, 2020.
- "Player Profile – Austin Meehan". Pro Basketball Encyclopedia. Pro Basketball Encyclopedia. 2018.
