= Robert N. C. Nix Sr. =

American politician (1898–1987)

Robert Nix
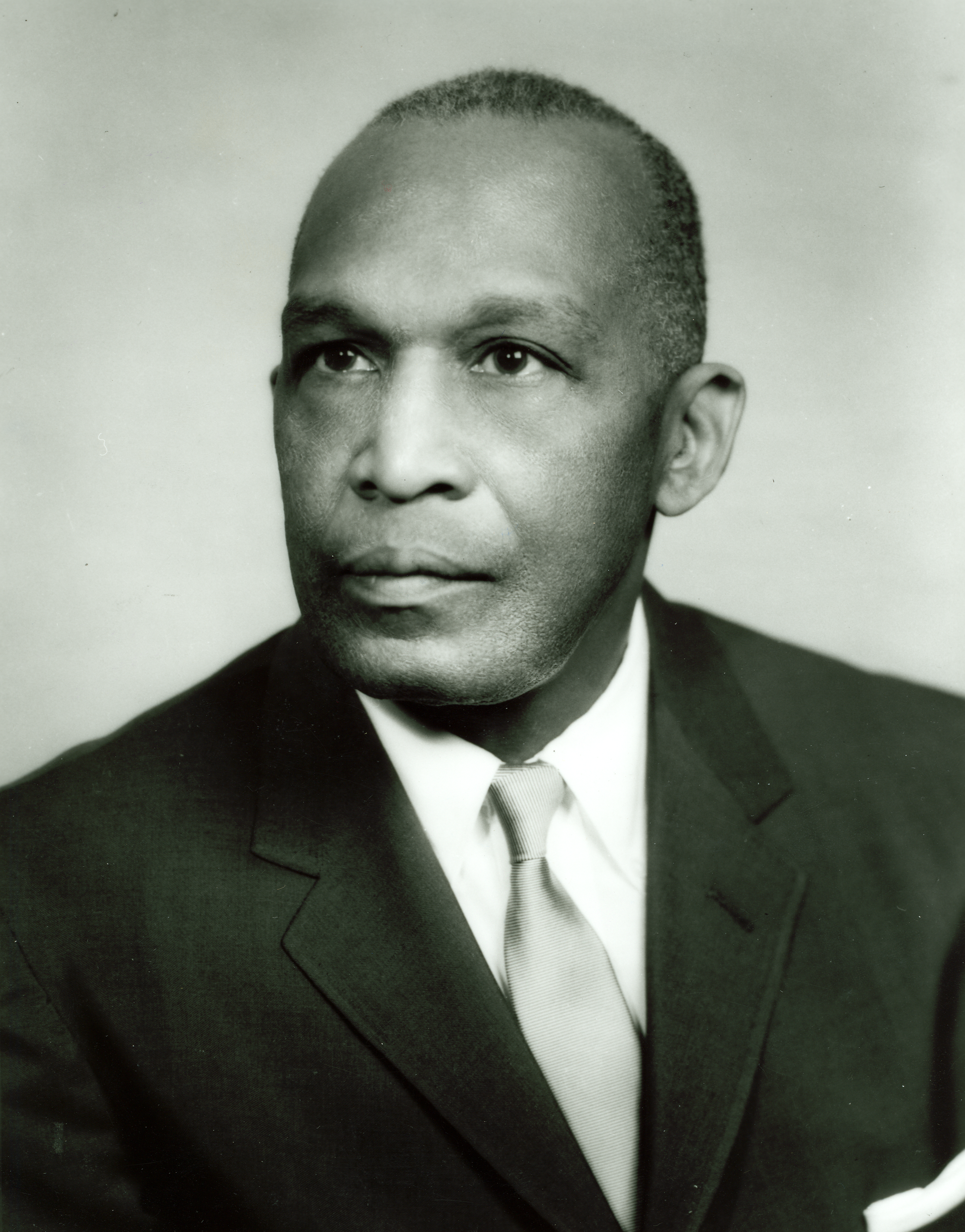

Member of the U.S. House of Representatives from Pennsylvania
- In office May 20, 1958 – January 3, 1979
- Preceded by: Earl Chudoff
- Succeeded by: Bill Gray
- Constituency: 4th district (1958–1963); 2nd district (1963–1979)

Personal details
- Born: Robert Nelson Cornelius Nix; August 9, 1898 Orangeburg, South Carolina, U.S.
- Died: June 22, 1987 (aged 88) Philadelphia, Pennsylvania, U.S.
- Party: Democratic
- Education: Lincoln University, Pennsylvania (BA); University of Pennsylvania (LLB)

Robert Nelson Cornelius Nix Sr. (August 9, 1898 – June 22, 1987) was an American politician who served in the United States House of Representatives from 1958 until 1979. He was the first African American to represent Pennsylvania in the House of Representatives. The Robert N. C. Nix Federal Building in Philadelphia, Pennsylvania is named in his honor.

== Early life ==
Born in Orangeburg, South Carolina, he attended Townsend Harris High School in New York City and graduated from Lincoln University (Pennsylvania) in 1921. He received his law degree from the University of Pennsylvania and began practicing in Philadelphia. He also was initiated into the Mu Omega chapter of Omega Psi Phi fraternity at the University of Pennsylvania. After entering private practice, Nix became active in the Democratic Party as a committeeman from the fourth ward in 1932. He became a special assistant deputy attorney general of Pennsylvania in 1934 and delegate to the 1956 Democratic National Convention.

== United States House of Representatives ==
In 1958, he defeated two opponents in a special election to fill a congressional vacancy left by Earl Chudoff in the House of Representatives. An elected official who rarely wanted or attracted widespread publicity, he supported mostly liberal legislation. He was reelected 10 times. He worked for the passage of the landmark legislation promoting the American Civil Rights Movement and privately sought to prevent the House from denying Rep. Adam Clayton Powell his seat in 1967. In 1962, he became the first member of congress to knowingly meet with gay activists, when he invited Frank Kameny to his office. In 1975, he introduced an amendment to the Foreign Military Sales Act requiring the Defense Department to provide the U.S. Congress with information on identities of agents who negotiate arms sales for American firms.

=== Committee service ===
Congressman Nix served on the Veterans' Affairs Committee, the Foreign Affairs Committee and the Committee on Merchant Marine and Fisheries. He was the chairman of the Committee on the Post Office and Civil Service and the chairman of the Subcommittee on International Economic Policy. Congressman Nix served 20 years before losing to William H. Gray III in the primary in 1978.

== Family ==
Congressman Nix's son, Robert N. C. Nix Jr., became the first African American to be elected to statewide office in Pennsylvania when he was elected to the Pennsylvania Supreme Court.

== Legacy ==
In 1985, the United States court house and post office building in Philadelphia was renamed the Robert N. C. Nix Sr. Federal Building and United States Post Office in honor of Nix.

== Famous quote ==
- "Be prepared, be sharp, be careful, and use the King's English well. And you can forget all the [other rules] unless you remember one more: Get paid."

== See also ==
- List of African-American United States representatives

U.S. House of Representatives
Preceded by Earl Chudoff	Member of the U.S. House of Representatives from Pennsylvania's 4th congressional district 1958–1963	Succeeded by Herman Toll
Preceded by Kathryn E. Granahan	Member of the U.S. House of Representatives from Pennsylvania's 2nd congressional district 1963–1979	Succeeded by Bill Gray
Preceded by David N. Henderson	Chair of the House Civil Service Committee; 1977–1979	Succeeded by James M. Hanley
Honorary titles
Preceded by Ray Madden	Oldest member of the U.S. House of Representatives; 1977–1979	Succeeded by Claude Pepper
