= Franklin J. Maloney =

American politician (1899–1958)

Member of the U.S. House of Representatives from Pennsylvania's 4th district
- In office January 3, 1947 – January 3, 1949

Personal details
- Born: Franklin John Maloney; March 29, 1899 Philadelphia, Pennsylvania, U.S.
- Died: September 15, 1958 (aged 59) Philadelphia, Pennsylvania, U.S.
- Resting place: West Laurel Hill Cemetery, Bala Cynwyd, Pennsylvania, U.S.
- Party: Republican
- Spouse: Ann Price
- Children: 1
- Education: Temple University School of Law
- Occupation: Politician; lawyer

Franklin John Maloney (March 29, 1899 – September 15, 1958) was a Republican member of the U.S. House of Representatives for Pennsylvania's 4th congressional district from 1947 to 1949.

== Early life ==
Maloney was born on March 29, 1899, in Philadelphia. He graduated from Temple University School of Law in 1922 and was admitted to the bar in 1923.

== Career ==
Maloney practiced law in Philadelphia. He was an unsuccessful Republican candidate for the U.S. House in 1944, but defeated the incumbent Democrat in a run for the 80th Congress in 1946, serving from January 3, 1947, to January 3, 1949. He was an unsuccessful candidate for reelection in 1948 against a new Democratic opponent, Earl Chudoff. During his term in office, he served in the Foreign Affairs and Merchant Marine and Fisheries committees.

In January 1949 Maloney was hospitalized as a result of a heart attack. He resumed practicing law in Philadelphia, but in 1950 he made another attempt at the House, this time failing to win the primary over an opponent backed by the "progressive" faction in the State's Republican politics.

== Personal life ==
Maloney married Ann Price. They had one son, Daniel. He lived at 5120 Newhall Street in Philadelphia.

Maloney died on September 15, 1958, at Woman's Medical College of Pennsylvania Hospital. He was buried at West Laurel Hill Cemetery in Philadelphia.

U.S. House of Representatives
Preceded by John E. Sheridan	Member of the U.S. House of Representatives from Pennsylvania's 4th congressional district 1947–1949	Succeeded by Earl Chudoff
