= Joseph L. Kun =

American judge

Joseph Lorenz Kun (November 27, 1882 – June 15, 1961) was a Philadelphia lawyer and judge who served for thirty years on the Philadelphia Court of Common Pleas.

== Early life ==
Kun was born in Ungvar, Hungary, (present-day Uzhhorod, Ukraine) in 1882, the son of Lorenz Kun and Bette (Adler) Kun. When he was four years old, his family emigrated to the United States and settled in Philadelphia. Kun's father found work in the city as a shoemaker, and Kun attended public schools there. After elementary education at the Horace Binney School, Kun attended Central High School, graduating in 1901. He graduated from the University of Pennsylvania Law School in 1904 and worked in the office of Samuel W. Salus, a lawyer and Republican state senator in Philadelphia.

== Early career ==
A few years later, Kun opened his own law office. In 1916, he was appointed a deputy attorney general by State Attorney General Francis Shunk Brown, the only Philadelphian Brown appointed during his term. In 1919, Kun was elected President of the Jewish Community of Philadelphia. In 1921, he joined the firm of Sundheim, Folz, and Sundheim, which later became known as Sundheim, Folz, and Kun. Later that year, he was sworn in as Assistant United States Attorney General. His main job there was to investigate and prosecute cases arising out of government contracts related to the First World War. At the same time, Kun was a leader in Jewish community affairs, serving as district president of his branch of B’nai Brith. He also served on the board of trustees of Keneseth Israel temple, one of the oldest reform synagogues in the United States.

== Career as a judge ==
In 1927, following the death of Common Pleas President Judge Charles E. Bartlett, Governor John Stuchell Fisher appointed Kun to fill the vacancy. The Philadelphia Inquirer called the appointment "in the nature of a surprise," noting that Kun, although a Republican like Fisher, had not been active in politics for several years. He was elected to a full ten-year term at the election that November. He was re-elected in 1937 and 1947 for additional terms on the court. In accordance with Pennsylvania's "sitting judge" principle, both Republicans and Democrats endorsed Kun and other incumbent judges when their terms came up for renewal. In 1950, he became President Judge of Common Pleas Court Number 1 after the death of Judge Harry S. McDevitt. Kun called the promotion "in no sense an achievement," as it was based purely on seniority.

On the bench, Kun gained a reputation as a strict observer of courtroom decorum. He presided over several important cases, including one in 1946 that challenged Pennsylvania's slum clearance law. Kun ruled that the program was a legal use of government power. "If the cities are to live," he wrote, "they must remove the blighted areas, which, like a cancerous growth, would eventually destroy them." In 1952, Kun made headlines again when he issued an injunction to prevent a strike by mass transit workers of the Philadelphia Transportation Company, drawing the ire of labor activists.

== Failed re-election ==
In 1957 Kun, now seventy-five years old, attempted to win another ten-year term on the court. In February of that year, however, the lawyers of the Philadelphia Bar Association voted by a 2-to-1 margin to name him "not qualified" to serve on the court. Many of the objections to his continued tenure came from organized labor. Kun defended his record of issuing anti-strike injunctions in the PTC case and others, calling the activity against him "pure invention for political purposes and nothing else." As in previous races, Kun ran in both parties' primaries, but the two organizations interpreted the sitting judge rule differently; Republicans said it applied to all judges, Democrats held that it only applied to judges considered qualified by the bar association. As a result, Kun won the Republican nomination but lost the Democratic contest to Earl Chudoff, a member of the federal House of Representatives from Pennsylvania's 4th congressional district. In the November election, Chudoff won easily, taking 58% of the vote.

Kun took his defeat philosophically, according to the Inquirer, saying he had foreseen the results as soon as the Democrats denied him renomination. Already in poor health, he said he would go into semi-retirement, practicing law only in so far as he was able. In 1961, he died at the age of 78 and was interred at Chelten Hills Cemetery in Philadelphia.
