= Edward E. Holloway =

American politician

Edward E. Holloway in 1950

Edward Estis Holloway (June 12, 1908 – April 8, 1993) was a Philadelphia cardiologist who also served as the last elected city coroner.

Holloway was born in 1908 in Philadelphia, the son of Daniel Holloway and Margaret Estis Holloway. Daniel Holloway was a doctor, one of just a few African Americans practicing medicine at the time. As a boy, Holloway often accompanied his father as he made housecalls on horseback in Southwest Philadelphia. After graduating from Central High School and Howard University, the son followed his father into the medical profession. He interned at Freedman's Hospital in Washington, D.C., before returning to his hometown in 1937 and starting his own practice in North Philadelphia.

Holloway married Mildred Brazington in 1938, but they divorced in the early 1940s. In 1944, he married again, to Ruth Smart, a social worker. Holloway quickly became recognized as one of the top men in his field; despite a lack of formal post-graduate training, he was certified by the American Board of Internal Medicine in 1946. In 1950, he became the second black doctor ever elected to the American College of Physicians. In 1955, he was the first ever elected to the American Board of Cardiovascular Diseases.

In 1953, Holloway married again, to Carmen Chisholm, with whom he later had two daughters, Michelle and Cheryl. That same year, he ran in the local election for Philadelphia city coroner as a Republican and won. He never took office, however, as the Democratic-majority City Council abolished several county offices, including coroner, and converted the jobs to civil service positions. Holloway and city treasurer Francis D. Pastorius filed suit to retain their offices, but were unsuccessful.

Meanwhile, Holloway's medical career progressed as he rose from an instructor at Women's Medical College to a clinical associate professor of medicine. He also gained a reputation as an engaging speaker at medical conferences. He served as the final chief of staff at Frederick Douglass Memorial Hospital and the only chief of staff at its successor, Mercy-Douglass Hospital.

Holloway and his wife divorced in 1977. He married for the last time soon thereafter to Agatha Lawson. He continued to practice medicine until 1991, when he retired. Two years later, Holloway died at the age of 84 at Philadelphia's Graduate Hospital and was buried at Mount Lawn Cemetery in Sharon Hill, Pennsylvania.

== Sources ==
- "Pennsylvania, Birth Certificates, 1906–1910". Ancestry.com.
- "Philadelphia, Pennsylvania, Marriage Index, 1885–1951". Ancestry.com.
- "Delaware, Marriage Records, 1750–1954". Ancestry.com.
- "Dr. Holloway Honored By College of Physicians". The Philadelphia Inquirer. April 20, 1950. p. 23 – via Newspapers.com.
- Miller, Joseph H. (November 4, 1953). "Republicans Victors In Phila.; Meyner Defeats Troast in N.J." The Philadelphia Inquirer. pp. 1, 2 – via Newspapers.com.
- "2 Republicans to File Suit for Abolished Jobs". The Philadelphia Inquirer. December 11, 1953. pp. 1, 28 – via Newspapers.com.
- Simmons, Rose (April 10, 1993). "E.E. Holloway, cardiologist, practiced in city for 53 years". The Philadelphia Inquirer. p. C8 – via Newspapers.com.
- Nicholson, Jim (April 12, 1993). "Dr. Edward Holloway; strived for excellence". Philadelphia Daily News. p. 64 – via Newspapers.com.
- Pray, Rusty (September 3, 1999). "Agatha L. Holloway, 74, of prominent family". The Philadelphia Inquirer. p. B10 – via Newspapers.com.
- Sims, Gayle Ronan (April 12, 2008). "C. Holloway-Allison, nurse anesthetist". The Philadelphia Inquirer. p. B6 – via Newspapers.com.
