= Frances R. Jones =

American politician

Frances R. Jones (May 18, 1911 – ?) was an American politician who was a state legislator in Pennsylvania. A Democrat, she served in the Pennsylvania House of Representatives, succeeding her husband, Granville E. Jones, after his sudden death in 1959. She was re-elected at least four times, serving from 1959 to 1966.

She was born in Mount Holly Springs, Pennsylvania.
