= Granville E. Jones =

American politician and funeral director

Granville Ennis Jones (October 14, 1900 – March 7, 1959) was an American funeral director and Democratic politician from Philadelphia.

== Early life ==
Jones was born in 1900 in Baltimore, to an unwed mother, Clara Mae Jones, and unnamed father.

== Career ==
After moving to Philadelphia, Jones graduated from the H. E. Dolan's College of Mortuary Science, after which he worked as a funeral director. Jones was also president of the Quaker City Funeral Directors Association.

In 1948, Jones was elected to the first of six terms in the Pennsylvania House of Representatives. In 1953, he ran for City Treasurer of Philadelphia, but was unsuccessful.

== Death ==
Jones died in 1959 while still serving his sixth term with the Pennsylvania House. He was succeeded by his wife, Frances R. Jones. They had two sons, Alfred and Sherman, and two daughters, Marilyn and Emma. He was buried at Mount Lawn Cemetery in Delaware County.

== Sources ==
- "Rep. G.E. Jones Dies at Age 58". Philadelphia Inquirer. March 8, 1959. p. 10 – via Newspapers.com.
- "Granville E. Jones". Historical Biographies. Pennsylvania House of Representatives. 2016.
