= Philadelphia City Treasurer =

Philadelphia elected office

The City Treasurer of Philadelphia is the manager of city funds and investments for the City of Philadelphia, Pennsylvania. The current city Treasurer is Jaqueline Dunn.

The duties of the City Treasurer include:

- Management of new and outstanding City debt in accordance with the city's Debt Management Policies, maximizing the value received from new financing and minimizing interest and transaction costs.
- Management of custodial banking for all City funds by encouraging standards and practices consistent with safeguarding City funds.
- Serve as the disbursing agent for payments from the City Treasury by distribution of checks and electronic payments in the most modern, secure, effective, and efficient method.
- Maximize amount of cash available for investment after meeting daily cash requirements, thereby providing a source of revenue to support the city's financial commitments.
- Management of the City's General Obligation Credit Rating
  - Philadelphia Authority for Industrial Development
  - Philadelphia Municipal Authority
  - Redevelopment Authority of the City of Philadelphia
  - Philadelphia Energy Authority
- Management of the City's Revenue Credit Rating
  - Philadelphia Water and Wastewater
  - Philadelphia International Airport
  - Philadelphia Gas Works
