= Morton Witkin =

American lawyer and politician

Morton Witkin (April 25, 1895 – April 20, 1973) was a Jewish-American lawyer and politician from Pennsylvania.

== Life ==
Witkin was born on April 25, 1895, in Philadelphia, Pennsylvania, the son of Myer Witkin and Ray Schmerling.

Witkin attended public schools and graduated from the Central High School in 1913. He entered the University of Pennsylvania later that year, spent a year in the Wharton School, and graduated from the Law School in 1917. Later that year, during World War I, he enlisted in the United States Army as a private in the Quartermaster Corps at Fort Monroe, Virginia. After his military service he worked as a lawyer in Philadelphia. In 1924, he was elected to the Pennsylvania House of Representatives as a Republican. He served in the House for five consecutive terms, from 1925 to 1936. From 1935 to 1936, he was Minority Floor Leader of the House. He didn't run for re-election in 1936. While in the House, he sponsored the Witkin Fire Arms Act, which passed the House in 1931.

Witkin was a delegate to the 1932, 1940, 1964, and 1972 Republican National Conventions. He was elected a Philadelphia County Commissioner in 1935, and was re-elected to the office in 1939, 1943, and 1947. He served as chairman of the three-person board from 1935 to 1951. He was a member of the Republican City Committee from the 13th Ward from 1931 to 1957. He practiced law with City Council member L. Wallace Egan under the firm name Witkin and Egan. The firm kept the name even after Egan's death in 1948. Witkin had an extensive practice on domestic relations and divorce matters, especially for the last fifteen years of his life, and practiced widely in the criminal courts. In the 1952 United States House of Representatives election, he was the Republican candidate in Pennsylvania's 3rd congressional district. He lost the election to Democratic candidate James A. Byrne.

Witkin was a member of the Philadelphia Bar Association, the Pennsylvania Bar Association, the American Bar Association, B'nai B'rith, and B'rith Sholom. He was president of the Northern Liberties Hospital in 1935 and the Golden Slipper Square Club in 1936. He was also a member of the Freemasons. He attended Congregation Rodeph Shalom. In 1919, he married Beatrice Ehrlich. They had a daughter, Majorie E. By the time Witkin died, he was married to Gale Brodnick.

Witkin died of heart failure at the Thomas Jefferson University Hospital on April 20, 1973.
