= United States Department of Justice War Division =

The United States Department of Justice War Division was a subdivision of the United States Department of Justice that was created on May 19, 1942 during World War II.

The purpose of the War Division was to combine several war-related activities spread across the Department. It consisted initially of the Special War Policies Unit, the Alien Property Unit, and the Alien Enemy Control Unit. The War Division later included the War Frauds Unit, which originated as the Economic Section of the Antitrust Division.

With the end of the war, the War Division was abolished on December 28, 1945.

== History ==
The War Division of the United States Department of Justice was created on 19 May 1942 during the Second World War to consolidate and manage the Department’s expanding wartime legal responsibilities, particularly in areas involving national security and internal security enforcement.

A key early development came under its first head, James W. Morris, who organised the division during its formation period in 1942 and established its core responsibilities, including coordination of enemy alien control and wartime security prosecutions that had previously been handled across multiple DOJ sections.

In 1943, leadership passed to Tom C. Clark, under whom the division expanded significantly. During this period, the War Division became the central coordinating body for legal action involving espionage, sabotage, wartime fraud, and the administration of alien property seized under federal wartime authority.

Following the end of the Second World War, the division was dissolved on 28 December 1945, and its responsibilities were redistributed within the Department of Justice, primarily into the Criminal Division and other permanent enforcement units.

== Leadership ==
The War Division of the United States Department of Justice was led by an Assistant Attorney General reporting to the Attorney General of the United States.

=== List ===
- James W. Morris (1942–1943)
- Herbert Wechsler (1943–1945)
- Charles E. Rhetts (1945; Acting)

=== First Assistant to the War Division ===
Charles E. Rhetts served as First Assistant of the War Division in the United States Department of Justice from 1944 to 1946. He was a senior official within the division and served as a principal assistant to the Assistant Attorney General responsible for the War Division. In 1945, Rhetts also served as Acting Assistant Attorney General during a transition in the division's leadership.
