= H. Jerome Jaspan =

American politician and lawyer

H. Jerome Jaspan (August 28, 1897 – November 24, 1969) was an American politician and lawyer.

Born in Philadelphia, Pennsylvania, Jaspan went to Wyoming Grammar School and Central High School. He received his law degree from Temple University Law School. He practiced law. Jaspan was the Pennsylvania Assistant Solicitor and special Pennsylvania Deputy Assistant Attorney General from 1926 to 1932. From 1937 to 1939, Jaspan served in the Pennsylvania State Senate and was a Democrat. Jaspan died in Germantown Hospital in Philadelphia, Pennsylvania.
