= Robert Duffy (American football) =

American football coach and lawyer (1903–1974)

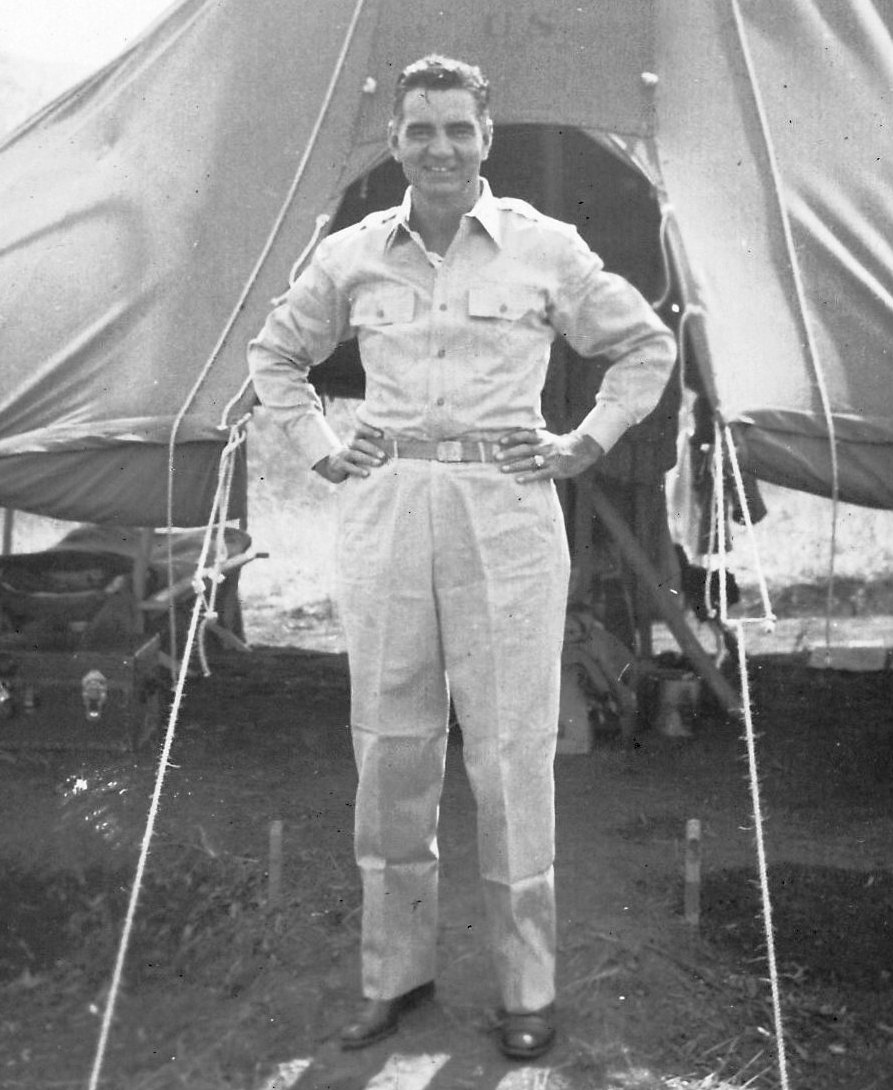
- Duffy in camp of 13th Troop Carrier Squadron, 1 mile south of Tontouta Air Base, New Caledonia, between December 1942 and July 1943

Biographical details
- Born: May 13, 1903; Binghamton, New York, U.S.
- Died: December 9, 1974 (aged 71); Philadelphia, Pennsylvania, U.S.

Coaching career (HC unless noted)
- 1927–1928: Dickinson

Head coaching record
- Overall: 6–9–1

Robert C. Duffy (May 13, 1903 – December 9, 1974) was an American college football coach and lawyer. He was the 20th head football coach at Dickinson College in Carlisle, Pennsylvania, serving for two seasons, from 1927 to 1928, and compiling a record of 6–9–1. After serving in World War II, he practiced law in Philadelphia and was elected Register of Wills as a Republican in 1953.

Duffy was born in Binghamton, New York in 1903. He graduated from Lafayette College in 1926, where he was an All-American football and basketball player. He later received his law degree from Dickinson Law School in 1929. While at Dickinson, he coached the football team there. His overall coaching record at Dickinson was 6–9–1. In 1930, he moved to Philadelphia to take up the practice of law.

During World War II, Duffy was assigned to the T13th Transport Squadron, nicknamed "The Thirsty 13th," from September 1942 until January 1945, first as the Intelligence Officer, and then the Executive Officer—right-hand man of the Commanding Officer, in New Caledonia, New Hebrides, and Biak. According to various squadron members: "Duffy was like a father to us. If you needed something, Duffy would get it done." "He was the backbone of the squadron." "The mentor of everyone was Bob Duffy, and everyone hung out with him and played cards with him." "The men loved Major Duffy."

After the war, Duffy returned to his law practice in Philadelphia. He also became involved with politics there as a Republican and was elected Register of Wills in 1953. While in office, he served as chairman of the Republican City Committee from 1953 to 1956. He did not run for re-election as Register of Wills in 1957, but continued his private law practice. Duffy also remained involved with football, serving as director of the College Football Hall of Fame and a trustee of the Pop Warner Conference. He died in 1974, at the age of 71.

== Head coaching record ==
Year	Team	Overall	Conference	Standing	Bowl/playoffs
Dickinson Red and White (Central Pennsylvania Conference / Eastern Pennsylvania Collegiate Conference) (1927–1928)
1927	Dickinson	3–5	1–3	5th	
1928	Dickinson	3–4–1	2–2	3rd	
Dickinson:		6–9–1	3–5		
Total:		6–9–1			

== Sources ==
- "2007 Centennial Conference Football Prospectus" (PDF). 2007. Archived from the original (PDF) on October 29, 2008.
- McDevitt, Frank (December 10, 1974). "Robert Duffy, 71; GOP Official, Former City Register of Wills". Philadelphia Inquirer. p. 4-B – via Newspapers.com.
