= 1991 Philadelphia mayoral election =

- November 5, 1991
- Turnout: 61% ▼10 pp
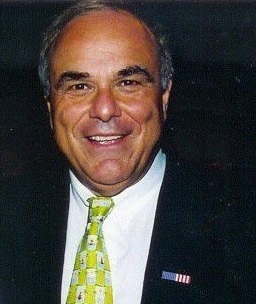

Nominee	Ed Rendell	Joseph M. Egan, Jr.
Party	Democratic	Republican
Popular vote	288,467	132,811
Percentage	64.24%	29.58%
- Results by ward Rendell: 40–50% 50–60% 60–70% 70–80% 80–90% Egan: 50–60%
Mayor before election
Wilson Goode
Democratic
Elected mayor
Ed Rendell
Democratic

The 1991 Philadelphia mayoral election saw the election of Democrat Ed Rendell.

== Democratic primary ==
=== Candidates ===
==== Declared ====
- Lucien Blackwell, City Councilman and Consumers Party nominee for Mayor in 1979
- George R. Burrell, Jr., City Councilman
- Peter Hearn, former Chancellor of the Philadelphia Bar Association
- Ed Rendell, former District Attorney of Philadelphia and candidate for Mayor in 1987

=== Results ===
Results by ward Rendell: 30%–40%; 40%–50%; 50%–60%; 60%–70%; 70%–80%; 80%–90%; Blackwell: 30%–40%; 40%–50%; 50%–60%; 60%–70%; Burrell: 30%–40%; 40%–50%

Philadelphia mayoral Democratic primary, 1991
Party	Candidate	Votes	%
Democratic	Ed Rendell	146,373	49.50
Democratic	Lucien Blackwell	79,212	26.79
Democratic	George R. Burrell, Jr.	43,787	14.81
Democratic	Peter Hearn	26,353	8.91
Total votes		295,725	100.00

== Republican primary ==
=== Candidates ===
- Ronald Castille, District Attorney of Philadelphia
- Sam Katz, municipal finance expert
- Frank Rizzo, former mayor from 1972–80

==== Withdrew ====
- Joan Specter, City Councilwoman (to run for re-election)
- Dennis Morrison-Wesley, tax consultant (to run as New Philadelphia candidate)

==== Declined ====
- Thacher Longstreth, nominee for Mayor in 1955 and 1971
- Brian J. O'Neill, City Councilman

=== Results ===
Results by ward Rizzo: 30%–40%; 40%–50%; 50%–60%; 60%–70%; Castille: 30%–40%; 40%–50%; 50%–60%; 60%–70%; Katz: 30%–40%; 40%–50%; 50%–60%; Tie: 30%–40%

Philadelphia mayoral Republican primary, 1991
Party	Candidate	Votes	%
Republican	Frank Rizzo	47,523	36.45
Republican	Ronald Castille	46,094	35.35
Republican	Sam Katz	36,764	28.20
Total votes		130,381	100.00

Following Rizzo's death, City Council candidate Joseph Egan was selected by the Philadelphia Republican Party to replace Rizzo as the nominee.

== General election ==
=== Candidates ===
- Willie Dennis-Scott (New Alliance)
- Pamela Lawler (Consumer)
- Kathleen Mickells, coal miner and nominee for Vice President of the United States in 1988 (Socialist Workers)
- Dennis Morrison-Wesley, tax consultant (New Philadelphia)

=== Results ===
1991 Philadelphia mayoral election
Party	Candidate	Votes	%
Democratic	Ed Rendell	288,467	64.24
Republican	Joseph M. Egan, Jr.	132,811	29.58
New Philadelphia	Dennis Morrison-Wesley	14,640	3.26
Citizens	Pamela Lawler	9,367	2.09
New Alliance	Willie Dennis Scott	1,934	0.43
Socialist Workers	Kathleen Mickells	1,811	0.40
Total votes		449,030	100.00
Democratic hold			
