= Bob Brady =

American politician (born 1945)

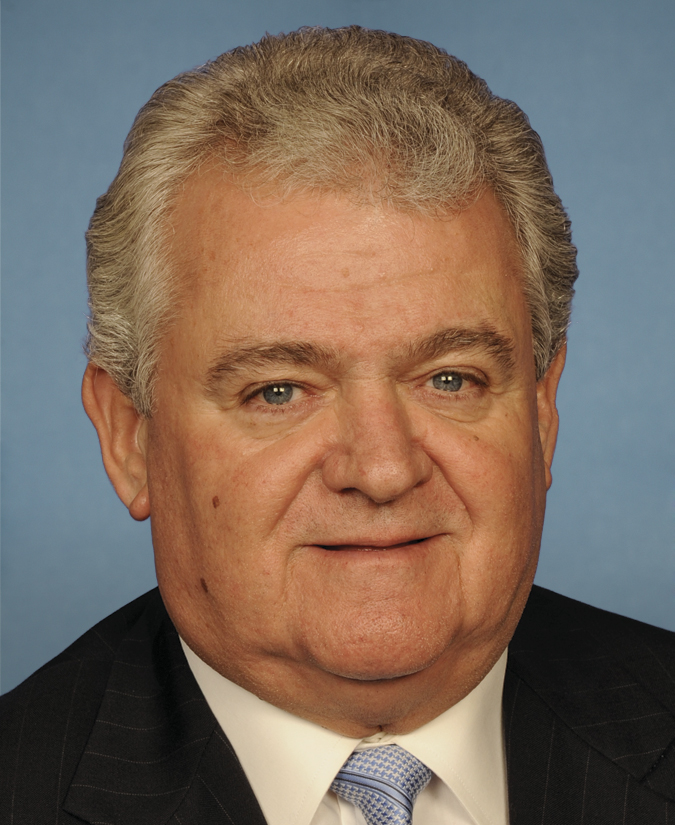

Chair of the Philadelphia Democratic Party
- Incumbent
- Assumed office June 16, 1986
- Preceded by: Joseph Smith

Chair of the House Administration Committee
- In office May 3, 2007 – January 3, 2011
- Preceded by: Juanita Millender-McDonald
- Succeeded by: Dan Lungren

Member of the U.S. House of Representatives from Pennsylvania's 1st district
- In office May 19, 1998 – January 3, 2019 (Note: Brady's official service begins on the date of the special election, while he was not sworn in until May 21, 1998.)
- Preceded by: Tom Foglietta
- Succeeded by: Brendan Boyle (redistricted)

Personal details
- Born: April 7, 1945 (age 81) Philadelphia, Pennsylvania, U.S.
- Party: Democratic
- Spouse(s): Ellen (divorced) Debra Savarese (m. 1999)
- Brady's voice Brady on naming a federal Post Office building after State Sen. Herbert Arlene. Recorded June 11, 2002

Robert A. Brady (born April 7, 1945) is an American politician who served as the U.S. representative for Pennsylvania's 1st congressional district from 1998 to 2019. He was the ranking Democrat and Chairman of the United States House Committee on House Administration from 2007 to 2019. He has served as Chairman of the Philadelphia Democratic Party since 1986 and is a registered lobbyist for NBC Universal and Independence Blue Cross.

== Early life, education, and pre-congressional career ==
Brady was born in Philadelphia, the son of Enez (née Caterini) and Robert G. Brady, a police officer. His father was of Irish descent, and his maternal grandparents were immigrants from Italy. His mother Enez was also a Democratic committee member. He graduated from St. Thomas More High School and Martin Technical School but did not attend college, instead going to work as a carpenter and member of Carpenters Local 8. He became a part of the leadership of the union and remains a member of several unions.

He was elected a division committeeman for the Democratic Party in 1968. In 1974, his mentor and ward leader George X. Schwartz got him a job as a sergeant-at-arms in Philadelphia City Council. When Schwartz stepped down as ward leader in 1982 and eventually went to jail in the wake of the Abscam scandal, Brady was elected to succeed him as Democratic Leader of west Philadelphia's 34th Ward, a position that he still holds today.

In 1983 Brady ran for an at-large seat on Philadelphia City Council. He was endorsed by Frank Rizzo and lost in the primary election. After Wilson Goode won the 1983 Philadelphia mayoral election, Brady joined Goode's staff as liaison with organized labor. In 1986 he worked as an economic consultant on City Council's Economic Development Committee.

Since June 1986, Brady has been the Chairman of the Philadelphia Democratic Party.

Brady has been a professor at the University of Pennsylvania where he instructs graduate students in management and political science. In April 1991 he was appointed to the Pennsylvania Turnpike Commission by Governor Bob Casey Sr., a position he held until his election to United States Congress in 1998.

In 1999 he married Debra Savarese, a former Philadelphia Eagles cheerleader.

== U.S. House of Representatives ==
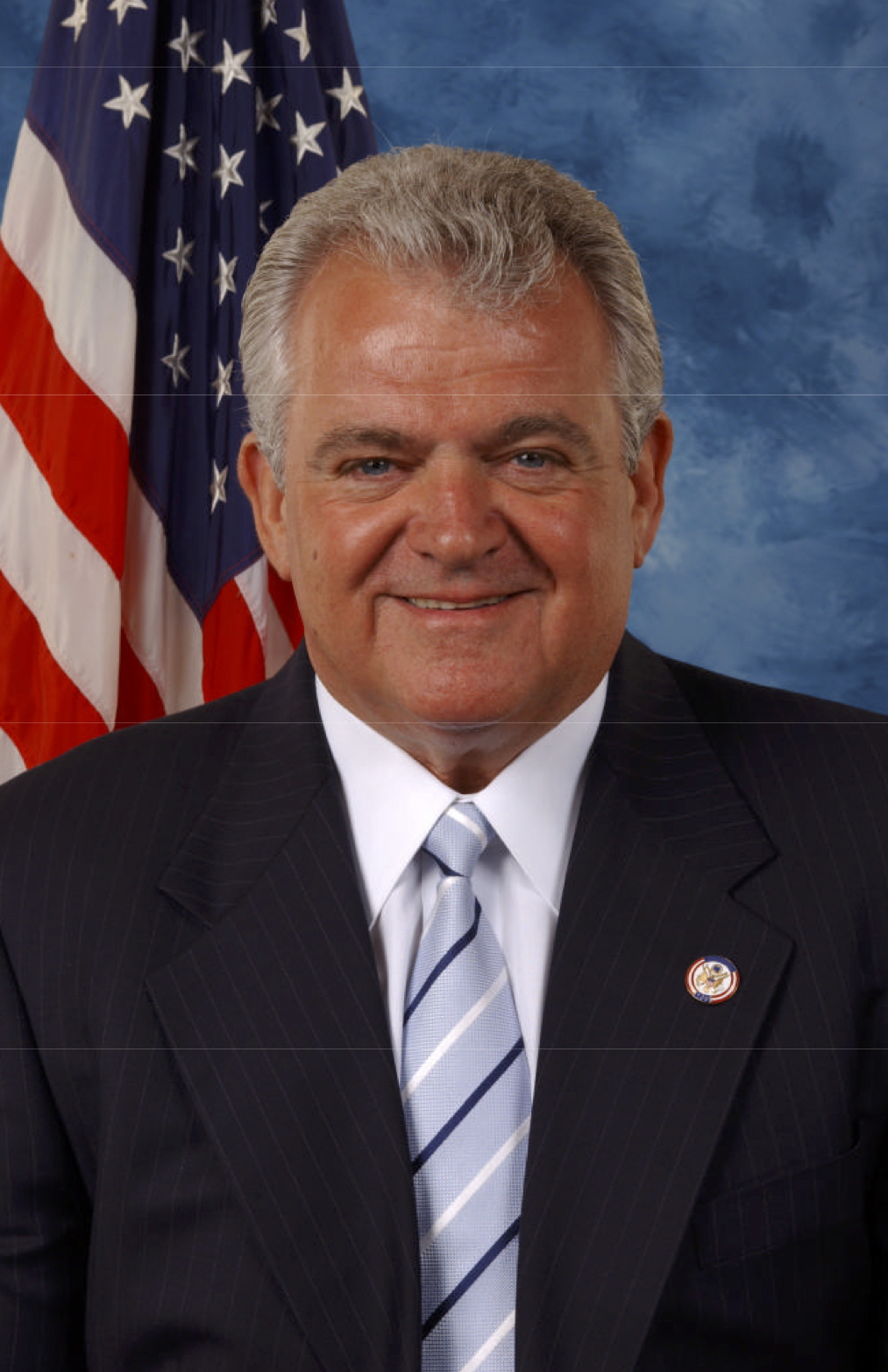
Brady during the 108th Congress

=== Elections ===
In November 1997, 17-year U.S. Congressman Tom Foglietta resigned from his seat in the House of Representatives after being named U.S. Ambassador to Italy by Bill Clinton. After a 1992 redistricting, the First District was becoming a majority Black district. Foglietta had defeated Black candidates in Democratic primaries in 1994 and 1996 and political observers assumed that his successor would be Black. In February 1998, Brady announced he would be running in the special election for Foglietta's vacated seat, despite not living within the district. When asked his position on NAFTA, Brady said "I don't know what that was about." When asked his position on abortion Brady said he had no position. On May 11, Brady left a debate between the congressional candidates early to attend a ward meeting.

The special election and primary election were held on May 19, 1998, with Brady running in both elections. He faced three opponents in the special election and three in the primary election. Brady won the special election with 74% of the vote and the primary election with 59% of the vote. His closest challenger in the Democratic primary was State Representative Andrew Carn, who received 21% of the vote. Brady was sworn in by Newt Gingrich on May 21, 1998.

In his first general election in November 1998 he defeated Republican William M. Harrison, winning 81% of the vote. In his victory speech he defended President Bill Clinton, saying "We have business to take care of in Washington and it's not this business of embarrassing our President."

Brady represented a heavily Democratic district and easily won each of his ten full terms, receiving at least 81% of the vote in each race and twice running unopposed. Republican Deborah Williams ran against Brady twice, in 2004 and 2016.

=== Tenure ===
In his 20 years in Congress, Brady was the primary sponsor of 14 pieces of legislation that were enacted into law and co-sponsored 200 bills that became law. Legislation that he co-sponsored mostly covered the areas of government operation, crime and law enforcement and transportation and public works. He voted against free trade deals and against the Authorization for Use of Military Force Against Iraq Resolution of 2002. As a member of the House Armed Services Committee, Brady was one of a select few permitted to view photos of the corpse of Osama bin Laden. "Oh he's dead," said Brady, "It's quite graphic. His brain and everything are coming out."

During the course of his congressional career, Brady estimated he helped bring $15.5 billion in federal funds to Philadelphia.

==== Corruption case ====
In November 2017, it was revealed that the Federal Bureau of Investigation (FBI) was investigating Brady for payments that Brady's campaign made in 2012 to an opponent in order to get the opponent to withdraw from the race. In January 2018, facing multiple declared primary opponents, he announced that he would not seek reelection. He said that his decision had nothing to do with the ongoing corruption probe, but that he instead wanted to spend more time with his family. As a result of these investigations, longtime Brady aides Ken Smuckler and Donald "D.A." Jones were both convicted of violating federal law and each sentenced to over a year in prison for their role in facilitating and covering up the $90,000 payment to a former Brady primary opponent.

=== Political positions ===
Brady is pro-choice and voted against President Bush's restrictions on funding to family planning groups in 2001. Over the years, he has supported minors' abortion rights, voting in 2005 for the right for those under 18 years of age to obtain abortions across state lines without parental consent. He voted against the Stupak-Pitts Amendment, which prohibits health insurance companies from offering abortion coverage in a plan to any citizen. He opposed a proposal to prohibit federally funded abortion services. Over the past fifteen years, organizations such as the National Association for the Repeal of Abortion Laws (NARAL), the National Family Planning & Reproductive Health Association, and Planned Parenthood rated him 100%.

Brady voted in favor of the Small Business Lending Fund and Tax Law Amendment. The September 2010 amendment provides loans to small business through financial institutions. He supported the Small Business Jobs Bill in October 2010.

Brady voted against the Secure Fence Act (2006), which authorized the construction of additional fencing along the U.S.-Mexico border, as well as the Immigration Law Enforcement Act of 2006. He supports Homeland Security Appropriations for border protection and The U.S. Visitor and Immigrant Status Technology project, which works towards improving the capability of the government to keep track of immigrants and control their entry and exit. Groups such as the National Latino Congreso/William C. Velásquez Institute, the American Immigration Lawyers Association, and the anti-immigration Federation for American Immigration Reform have rated Brady between 50% and 100% for his pro-immigration political stances.

=== Attention to constituents ===
Brady claims to have once refused to receive a phone call from President Bill Clinton because he was busy helping a woman who had called seeking someone to come over and fix her toilet.

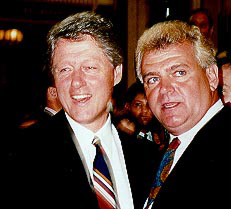
Brady with President Bill Clinton

=== Committee assignments ===
- Committee on Armed Services
  - Subcommittee on Military Personnel
- Committee on House Administration (Ranking Member)
  - Subcommittee on Elections (Ranking Member)

=== Caucus memberships ===
- Congressional Arts Caucus
- House Baltic Caucus

== Philadelphia Democratic City Committee ==
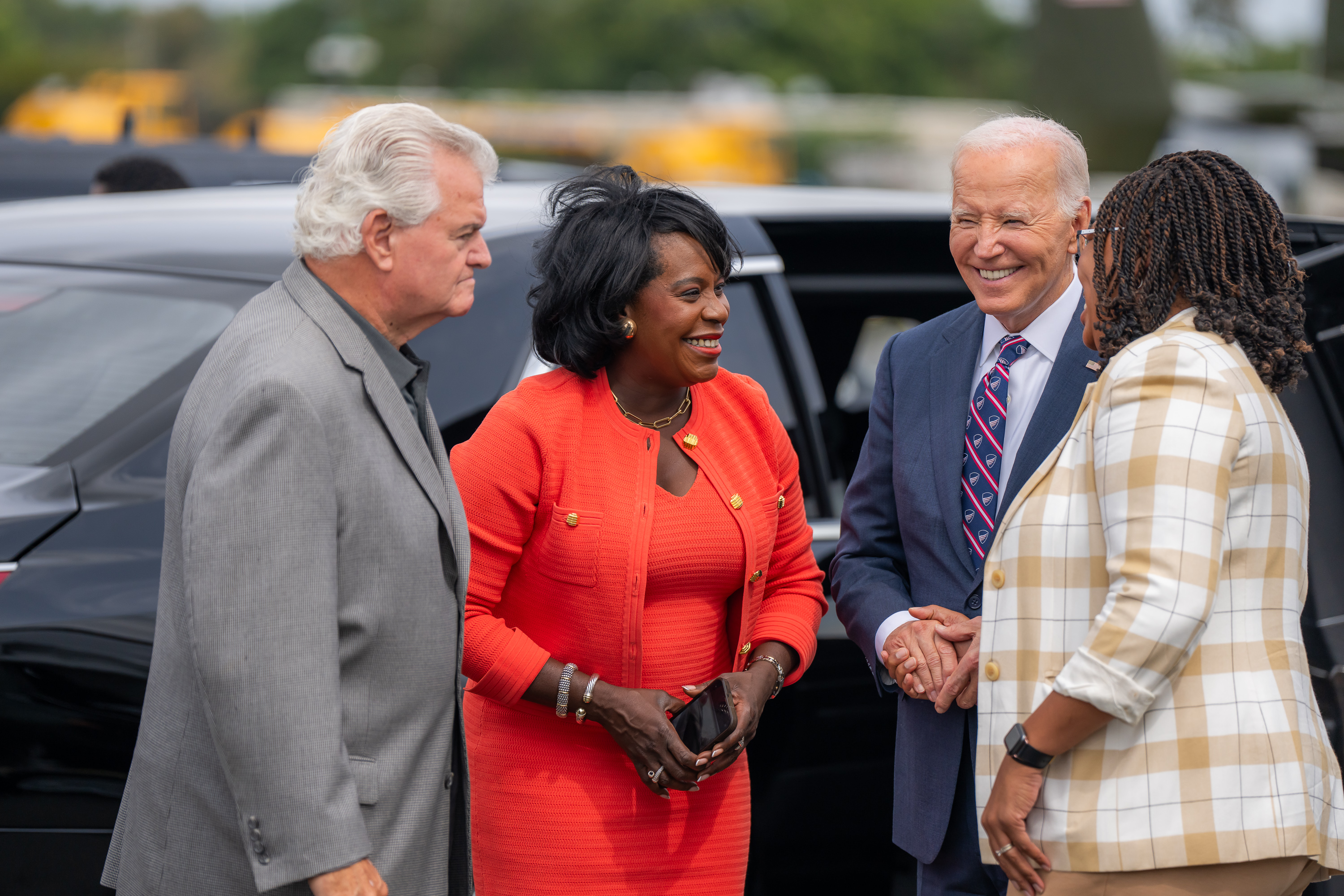
Brady with Cherelle Parker, President Joe Biden and Monica Taylor in 2024

Brady has been chair of the Philadelphia Democratic Party since June 1986, when he replaced previous chair Joseph Smith. In his first bid for chair, Brady had the support of Wilson Goode, Lucien Blackwell, and the majority of Philadelphia's 69 Democratic ward leaders, who felt Philadelphia's Democratic Party was suffering from fragmentation, low-morale and financial trouble after losing the District Attorney race to Republican Ron Castille. He was elected by a vote of 44–23.

Wilson Goode credited Brady for his victory over Frank Rizzo in the 1987 Philadelphia mayoral election, saying "without Bob Brady being the party chair, it was possible I could have lost the election."

A power struggle played out in the 1990 Democratic primary, with Brady's three party-backed candidates losing to candidates backed by William H. Gray III and the "Northwest Coalition", a group of high turnout Democratic wards in Philadelphia. After these losses Brady's leadership of the party was questioned but ultimately he won a new four-year term as chair. Wilson Goode supported Brady's re-election as chair, saying "Under Bob Brady's leadership, the Democratic Party has been more unified than it ever has been in the past two decades."

After winning election to US Congress in 1998, he would say that he still considered running Philadelphia's Democratic Party his top priority.

In 2003, protestors surrounded Democratic Party headquarters as Democratic committee members were inside considering primary endorsements. Protestors were demanding the resignation of party treasurer Johnny Dougherty over allegations that Dougherty, in his other role as a labor union leader, denied Black workers from being selected to work on taxpayer funded projects.

The Democratic City Committee holds sway in judicial elections, where candidates will pay the party upwards of $35,000 for placement on a sample ballot. Brady has a large influence on this process, saying "I'm told I elect judges. That is the hand that was dealt me as party chairman 20 years ago."

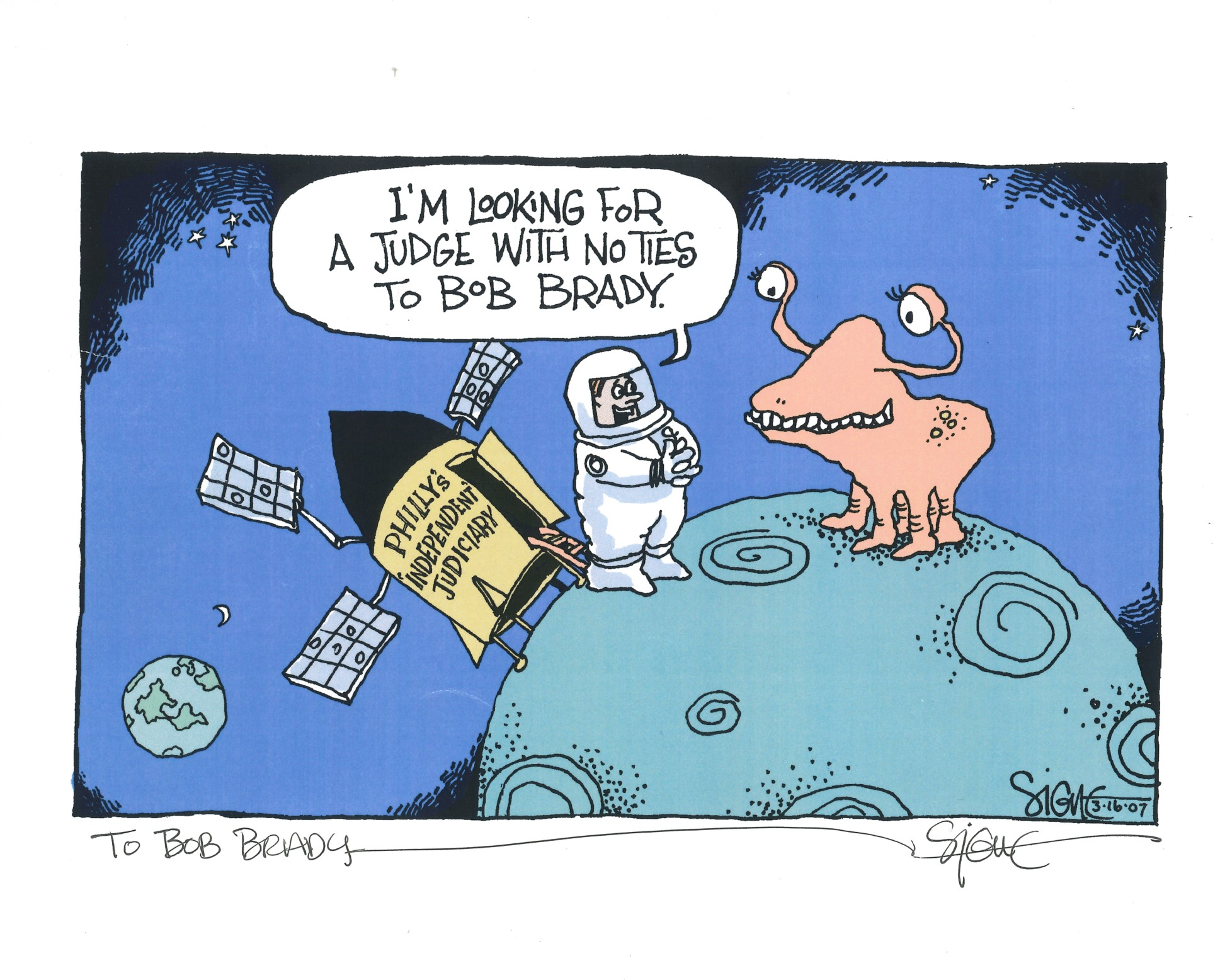
"I'm looking for a judge with no ties to Bob Brady", by Philadelphia Inquirer editorial cartoonist Signe Wilkinson, 03.16.2007

Through his tenure as chair, political consultants have praised his ability to unify the party.

Brady has received criticism for the low turnout in Philadelphia's Democratic primaries, which has been as low as 10%. Had Hillary Clinton received just 27 additional votes in each Philadelphia polling place, she would've won Pennsylvania's electoral votes in the 2016 United States presidential election.

During the 2019 Philadelphia City Council elections, Working Families Party candidates Kendra Brooks and Nicolas O'Rourke were running for two seats reserved for minority party candidates. Despite this being no threat to Democratic candidates running for City Council, Brady threatened expulsion of Democratic ward leaders and committee members who supported Working Families Party candidates.

In June 2020, Northeast Philadelphia ward leader Brian Eddis called on Brady to resign as chair due to "lack of diversity in the party." Brady called a meeting of clergy members and party officials to discuss how to handle racial justice protests in the wake of the murder of George Floyd and the violent confrontations that had occurred near the statue of Christopher Columbus in Marconi Plaza. No consensus was reached.

In March 2021, Brady reportedly asked the candidate for the Court of Common Pleas Caroline Turner to drop out of the race in exchange for his help in getting her a judicial appointment at a later date. Brady also reportedly warned that she would not get the endorsement of Philadelphia's 2nd Democratic Ward. Brady and the Philadelphia Democratic City Committee disputed the memo's claim through an attorney and asserted no such ask ever took place. The Intercept reported, "Louis Agre, a lawyer for the city party said that Turner requested the meeting. "She said she wanted to show respect," he said. Agre, who also represents Philadelphia's 21st Ward on the city committee, said that Brady said he never asked her, or anyone else, to drop out of the race, nor did he offer support for a judgeship appointment. "He never asked her to get out of the race, he never threatened her," Agre said." The 2nd Ward later endorsed Turner on March 25. Turner would go on to be defeated by Philadelphia Democratic City Committee-endorsed candidates in the Primary election.

== 2007 Philadelphia mayoral campaign ==
On January 25, 2007 Brady announced that he would seek the Democratic Party nomination for mayor of Philadelphia. He was the second sitting U.S. Congressman after Chaka Fattah to announce his candidacy for mayor. On March 6, Brady failed to list his city pension on the financial-interests statement he filed with his nominating petitions. Within a week Milton Street filed a petition challenge to remove Brady from the ballot for failing to disclose his pension income. Another challenge was brought by a group of voters, and supported by mayoral candidates Tom Knox and Dwight Evans. On April 13, 2007, the Pennsylvania Commonwealth Court ruled that Brady's failure to not list part of his income would not keep him off the primary ballot. On May 15, 2007, Brady lost the Democratic mayoral primary to Michael Nutter, finishing third in a seven candidate field

== Power and influence ==
- The Philadelphia Inquirer described him as "the longtime boss of the Democratic City Committee, one of the few old-fashioned big-city political machines left. Running against him could equal career suicide."
- Politico described him as "the old-school politician and party boss — known in Congress as a fixer and backroom dealmaker."
- In 2001, the political website PoliticsPA described him as a "consummate 'backroom politician' (and we say that with respect!)" and said that he might be the best county party chair in Pennsylvania. In 2003, the Pennsylvania Report said that Brady has "managed effectively to balance his multiracial district and city Democratic party."
- In 2009, the Pennsylvania Report noted that "[w]hile he still would like to be Mayor, Brady's influence and power in Philadelphia remains strong."
- Pennsylvania State Senator Anthony Williams said he is "probably one of the most politically astute politicians in the last 20 years, and that's rarefied air." J. Whyatt Mondesire, head of the Philadelphia chapter of the NAACP, said no one can match "Brady's relationships with politicians across the Democratic landscape."
- In 2015, during Pope Francis's visit to the United States, he stole the glass that the Pope drank from and then drank from it himself, had his wife and two others drink from it, had Sen. Bob Casey, his wife and mother as well as Rep. Joseph Crowley stick their fingers in the glass. He said he also planned to have the Philadelphia police dust the glass to lift the Pope's fingerprints. Brady said, "I'm sure it's blessed if the Pope drank out of it. Why not?" and "If not, I'm saying it is." Additionally, in 2009, Brady stole the glass used by former President Barack Obama after his inauguration.

== Electoral history ==
=== U.S. House of Representatives ===
==== 2016 U.S. House Election ====
2016 U.S. House of Representatives election, District 1
Party	Candidate	Votes	%
Democratic	Bob Brady (Incumbent)	183,274	83.16
Republican	Deborah L. Williams	37,119	16.84
Total votes		220,393	100.00
Democratic hold			

==== 2014 U.S. House Election ====
2014 U.S. House of Representatives election, District 1
Party	Candidate	Votes	%
Democratic	Bob Brady (Incumbent)	95,195	85.16
Republican	Megan Ann Rath	16,592	14.84
Total votes		111,787	100.00
Democratic hold			

==== 2012 U.S. House Election ====
2012 U.S. House of Representatives election, District 1
Party	Candidate	Votes	%
Democratic	Bob Brady (Incumbent)	173,832	86.27
Republican	John J. Featherman	27,669	13.73
Total votes		201,501	100.00
Democratic hold			

==== 2010 U.S. House Election ====
2010 U.S. House of Representatives election, District 1
Party	Candidate	Votes	%
Democratic	Bob Brady (Incumbent)	132,596	100.00
Total votes		132,596	100.00
Democratic hold			

==== 2008 U.S. House Election ====
2008 U.S. House of Representatives election, District 1
Party	Candidate	Votes	%
Democratic	Bob Brady (Incumbent)	216,991	91.05
Republican	Mike Muhammed	21,324	8.95
Total votes		238,315	100.00
Democratic hold			

==== 2006 U.S. House Election ====
2006 U.S. House of Representatives election, District 1
Party	Candidate	Votes	%
Democratic	Bob Brady (Incumbent)	124,352	100.00
Total votes		124,352	100.00
Democratic hold			

==== 2004 U.S. House Election ====
2004 U.S. House of Representatives election, District 1
Party	Candidate	Votes	%
Democratic	Bob Brady (Incumbent)	192,024	86.75
Republican	Deborah L. Williams	28,558	12.90
Independent	Christopher Randolph	765	0.35
Total votes		221,347	100.00
Democratic hold			

==== 2002 U.S. House Election ====
2002 U.S. House of Representatives election, District 1
Party	Candidate	Votes	%
Democratic	Bob Brady (Incumbent)	109,852	87.74
Republican	Marie G. Delaney	13,973	11.16
Green	Mike Ewall	1,379	1.10
Total votes		125,204	100.00
Democratic hold			

==== 2000 U.S. House Election ====
2000 U.S. House of Representatives election, District 1
Party	Candidate	Votes	%
Democratic	Bob Brady (Incumbent)	134,873	91.19
Republican	Steven N. Kush	13,029	8.81
Total votes		147,902	100.00
Democratic hold			

==== 1998 U.S. House Election ====
1998 U.S. House of Representatives election, District 1
Party	Candidate	Votes	%
Democratic	Bob Brady (Incumbent)	77,788	81.10
Republican	William M. Harrison	15,898	16.50
Libertarian	John J. Featherman	1,198	1.25
Socialist	Nancy Cole	964	1.00
Total votes		95,848	100.00
Democratic hold			

==== 1998 U.S. House Special Election ====
1998 U.S. House special election, District 1
Party	Candidate	Votes	%
Democratic	Bob Brady	13,644	71.40
Republican	William M. Harrison	2,942	15.40
Reform	Juanita Norwood	1,895	9.90
Libertarian	John J. Featherman	619	3.20
Total votes		19,100	100.00

=== Mayor of Philadelphia ===
==== 2007 Democratic Primary ====
Philadelphia mayoral primary election, 2007
Party	Candidate	Votes	%
Democratic	Michael Nutter	106,805	36.6
Democratic	Thomas J. Knox	71,731	24.6
Democratic	Bob Brady	44,474	15.3
Democratic	Chaka Fattah	44,301	15.2
Democratic	Dwight Evans	22,782	7.8
Democratic	Queena Bass	950	0.3
Democratic	Jesus White	437	0.1
Total votes		291,510	100.0

U.S. House of Representatives
Preceded by Thomas M. Foglietta	Member of the U.S. House of Representatives from Pennsylvania's 1st congressional district 1998–2019	Succeeded by Brian Fitzpatrick
Preceded by Juanita Millender-McDonald	Chair of the House Administration Committee; 2007–2011	Succeeded by Dan Lungren
Preceded by Dianne Feinstein	Chair of the Joint Library Committee; 2009–2011	Succeeded by Chuck Schumer
Preceded by Dan Lungren	Ranking Member of the House Administration Committee; 2011–2019	Succeeded by Rodney Davis
U.S. order of precedence (ceremonial)
Preceded by Joe Pitts as Former U.S. Representative	Order of precedence of the United States as Former U.S. Representative	Succeeded by Sam Gejdenson as Former U.S. Representative
