= 1971 Philadelphia mayoral election =

- November 2, 1971
- Turnout: 77% ▲4 pp
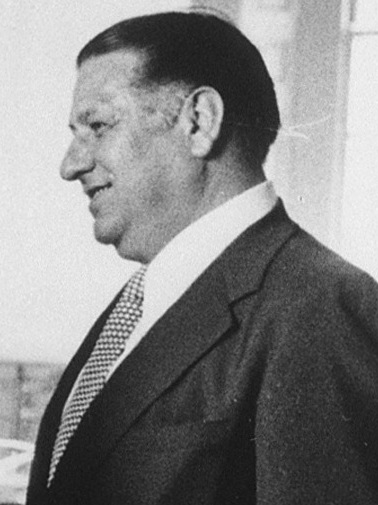

Nominee	Frank Rizzo	Thacher Longstreth
Party	Democratic	Republican
Popular vote	394,067	345,912
Percentage	52.87%	46.41%
- Results by ward Rizzo: 50–60% 60–70% 70–80% 80–90% Longstreth: 50–60% 60–70% 70–80% 80–90%
Mayor before election
James Tate
Democratic
Elected mayor
Frank Rizzo
Democratic

The 1971 Philadelphia mayoral election took place on November 2, 1971, to fill the 182nd mayoral term in Philadelphia, with Democratic nominee Frank Rizzo defeating Republican Thacher Longstreth. While Longstreth received many split ticket votes from Democrats, Rizzo found support among unions and the white working-class electorate.

Rizzo was the first Italian-American mayor of Philadelphia, and would be reelected in 1975 before a failed attempt to change the city charter to allow him to run for a third term.

== Democratic primary ==
=== Candidates ===
==== Declared ====
- William J. Green III, U.S. Representative from Pennsylvania's 5th congressional district
- Ira Einhorn, counterculture figure and future convicted murderer
- Frank Lomento, pretzel vendor
- James E. Poole
- Albert Sprague, member of Local 141 of the Lithographers and Photo Engravers International Union
- Frank Rizzo, Police Commissioner and acting Mayor
- Hardy Williams, State Representative from the 191st district

==== Withdrew ====
- David Cohen, former City Councilman (endorsed Green)

=== Campaign ===
Frank Rizzo had a reputation for his harsh policing style and was called "the toughest cop in America". He began as the frontrunner for the nomination, with the endorsement of the city's Democratic organization.

Rizzo refused to debate or attend the same events as his opponents. Green refused to discuss most issues, and avoided interviews or written questions by the media or civic groups. He also refused to join his opponents in testifying on the city's financial problems before the Philadelphia City Council. Rizzo also did not make many campaign appearances, making only a single appearance a day and only appearing in white ethnic neighborhoods considered to be friendly towards him.

Rizzo repeatedly insisted that he was "not a politician". Rizzo took a position against additional taxes.

Rizzo had earned goodwill with many voters, who perceived his command of the police department as having staved off the sort of violent rioting other cities had experienced years earlier.

Green warned voters that it would be a "disaster" if America's then-fourth largest city were to be led by Rizzo.

Liberal politicians primarily supported Green. Shortly before the primary, governor Milton Shapp endorsed Green (after which Rizzo attacked Shapp's record).

Green's camp had attempted to get Williams to withdraw, in order to unite liberal voters around Green and against Rizzo. Williams refused.

Williams was the first well-known African American to run for mayor of Philadelphia.

After Shapp accused Rizzo of police brutality and Pennsylvania Attorney General J . Shane Creamer found Rizzo guilty of having beaten a black demonstrator in 1965, Rizzo dismissed this as a political "cheap shot".

The Philadelphia Bulletin argued that the real race was not between Rizzo and Green, but between incumbent mayor Tate and governor Shapp for control of the Philadelphia Democratic Party. This newspaper declined to endorse a candidate.

=== Results ===
Philadelphia mayoral Democratic primary, 1971
Party	Candidate	Votes	%
Democratic	Frank Rizzo	176,621	48.86
Democratic	William J. Green III	127,902	35.38
Democratic	Hardy Williams	45,026	12.46
Democratic	David A. Cohen	4,176	1.16
Democratic	James E. Poole	2,774	0.77
Democratic	Frank Lomento	2,454	0.68
Democratic	Albert Sprague	1,534	0.42
Democratic	Ira Einhorn	1,022	0.28
Total votes		361,509	100.00

== Republican primary ==
=== Candidates ===
==== Declared ====
- Thacher Longstreth, At-large City Councilman and candidate for Mayor in 1955

=== Results ===
Longstreth faced only nominal opposition for the nomination.

Philadelphia mayoral Republican primary, 1971
Party	Candidate	Votes	%
Republican	Thacher Longstreth	91,670	87.32
Republican	Irene M. Monahan	8,852	8.43
Republican	Odessa Bond	2,780	2.65
Republican	Vaiinupo J. Alailima	1,676	1.60
Total votes		104,978	100.00

== General election ==
=== Candidates ===
- Clarissa Cain, candidate for City Controller in 1969 and Governor in 1970 (Constitutional)
- Joseph J. Frieri, candidate for Mayor in 1971 (Conservative)
- Thacher Longstreth, At-large City Councilman and candidate for Mayor in 1955 (Republican)
- Frank Rizzo, Police Commissioner and acting Mayor (Democratic)
- Jean Savage (Socialist Workers)
- George S. Taylor, perennial candidate (Socialist Labor)

=== Campaign ===
Rizzo, who had resigned as Police Commissioner earlier in the year, ran a "law-and-order" based campaign to appeal to white, blue-collar voters. His campaign slogan "Rizzo means business" embodied this. All major unions in Philadelphia endorsed Rizzo. Rizzo pledged to hire 2,000 more police officers to restore law and order. Longstreth ran to the left of Rizzo, arguing his methods were "overkill" and racially motivated. He won the endorsement of liberal Democrats and blacks throughout the city, which made the race competitive in a city where Democrats outnumbered Republicans 2-to-1. The two largest daily newspapers in Philadelphia, as well as many other news organizations, endorsed Republican Longstreth. Longstreth also criticized Rizzo's policy proposal to ban tax increases in the next four years as an "insult to the intelligence of voters" as the city of Philadelphia faced budgetary issues at the time. While Longstreth campaigned throughout the city, Rizzo focused primarily on white, working class areas of the city.

=== Results ===
The general election was close, with Rizzo defeating Longstreth by about 7% of the vote. Nonetheless, Rizzo benefited from white racial backlash en route to his first mayoral victory. Rizzo would be re-elected in 1975 in a landslide, increasing his vote share to nearly 57%. Rizzo would later run for mayor as a Republican in 1987 in what would be the first mayoral loss of his career to Democrat Wilson Goode.

1971 Philadelphia mayoral election
Party	Candidate	Votes	%
Democratic	Frank Rizzo	394,067	52.87
Republican	Thacher Longstreth	345,912	46.41
Constitution	Joseph J. Frieri	2,456	0.33
Conservative	Clarissa Cain	1,054	0.14
Socialist Labor	George S. Taylor	948	0.13
Socialist Workers	Jean Savage	919	0.12
Total votes		745,356	100.00
