= Dick Doran =

American writer

Richard A. Doran (May 10, 1935 – January 22, 2007) served as a legislative assistant to Philadelphia Congressman William J. Green, as executive director of the Philadelphia Democratic County Executive Committee, as Chief of Staff to Governor Milton J. Shapp, as President of the Greater Philadelphia First Corporation, as Philadelphia City Representative and Director of Commerce, and as vice-president of Independence Blue Cross.

== Cultural institutions ==
A leader in the world of Philadelphia cultural institutions, he was chairman of the Board of the Curtis Institute of Music, a member of the Board of the Opera Company of Philadelphia, and an advisor to the Philadelphia Museum of Art and the Philadelphia Orchestra. He served as a mentor and friend to the Chinese pianist Lang Lang in his youth, who studied with Gary Graffman at Curtis.

== Author ==
He was the author of an extensive personal diary for the years 2000–2002 entitled Suddenly Sixty-Five. He was the author of a political novel—he called it a fable—about the corruption caused by large campaign contributions, lobbyists, and pollsters entitled It Takes A Villain.

== Death and legacy ==
Doran died suddenly in New York, possibly of a heart attack, on January 22, 2007, at the age of 71, immediately after a performance of the Metropolitan Opera.

His close friend, the former Congressman and Mayor of Philadelphia, William J. Green, III, eulogized him as "Thomas Jefferson without the contradictions" and said of his cultural leadership "he gave and he gave and he gave until he just couldn't give any more."
