= Phyllis Kaniss =

Sociologist

Phyllis Kaniss was the executive director of the American Academy of Political and Social Science. Born in 1951 in Philadelphia, she received her Bachelor of Arts degree from the University of Pennsylvania and a Ph.D. in Regional Science from Cornell University.

In 1999 Kaniss created the Student Voices Project, an initiative sponsored by the Annenberg Public Policy Center that works with urban school systems to encourage youth civic involvement. Kaniss served as Assistant Dean for the Annenberg School for Communications and taught courses on local news media and urban politics and policy. Her book, The Media and the Mayor's Race: The Failure of Urban Political Reporting, an account of how the media covered the 1991 mayoral race involving Edward G. Rendell and Frank Rizzo, won the 1995 Bart Richards Award for media criticism. Kaniss also published numerous Op-Eds in newspapers, including the Philadelphia Inquirer and New York Times. Kaniss died December 17, 2010, after a long battle with cancer.

== Bibliography ==
- The Media and the Mayor's Race: The Failure of Urban Political Reporting(Indiana University Press, 1995)
- Making Local News (University of Chicago Press, 1991)
