= Thacher Longstreth =

American politician

W. Thacher Longstreth
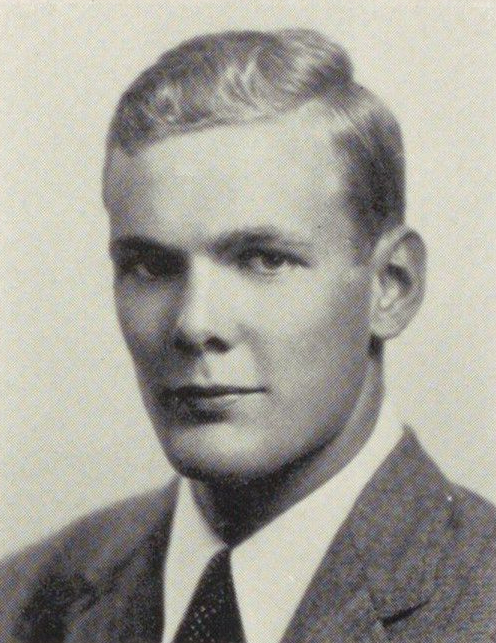
- Longstreth in the Princeton University yearbook, 1941

Member of the Philadelphia City Council from the at-large district
- In office January 2, 1984 – April 11, 2003
- Preceded by: Beatrice Chernock
- Succeeded by: Jack Kelly
- In office January 1, 1968 – January 3, 1972
- Preceded by: Virginia Knauer
- Succeeded by: Beatrice Chernock

Personal details
- Born: January 1, 1920 Philadelphia, Pennsylvania, U.S.
- Died: April 11, 2003 (aged 83) Naples, Florida, U.S.
- Party: Republican
- Spouse: Anne Nancy Claghorn (m. 1941)
- Education: Princeton University (BA)
- Occupation: Politician

Military service
- Allegiance: United States
- Branch/service: United States Navy
- Years of service: 1942-1946
- Rank: Lieutenant Commander
- Battles/wars: World War II
- Awards: Bronze Star Medal (Two)

William Thacher Longstreth (November 4, 1920 – April 11, 2003) was a Republican member of the Philadelphia City Council who was perhaps best known for his long tenure and unique image.

== Biography ==
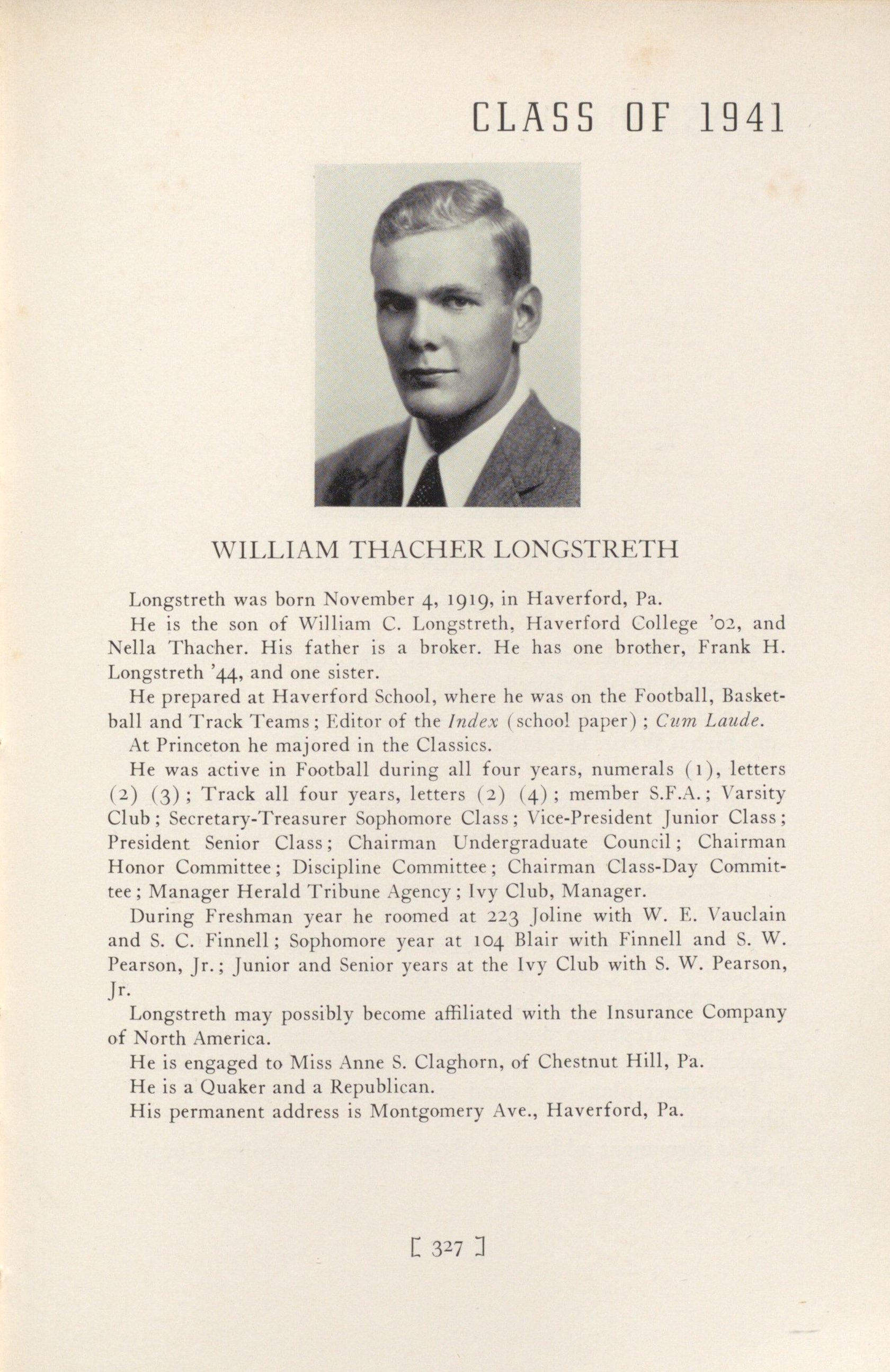
Longstreth in the Princeton University yearbook, 1941

Longstreth, a graduate of Princeton University, was an eighth-generation Philadelphian born to Quakers William Collins (b. 1882) and Nella (née Thacher) Longstreth, who married in 1917. William C. Longstreth owned the Longstreth Motor Car Company and his family lived in Haverford, Pennsylvania, and was affluent until the Wall Street Crash of 1929. Thacher was a cousin of President Herbert Hoover and his maternal grandmother, Ella Hoover Thacher was the president of the Woman's Christian Temperance Union for many years. In 1970, he led the Philadelphia Chamber of Commerce and spearheaded the drive to hold the annual Earth Day commemoration in Philadelphia. That event became one of the biggest Earth Day events in the nation. He was also instrumental in the creation of the Greater Delaware Valley Chapter of the National Multiple Sclerosis Society. He was predeceased by his half sister, Nella Cameron Downward (1913–1997). His younger brother, Frank Hoover Longstreth (b. 1922) died in 2008.

He was a two-time Republican nominee for Mayor of Philadelphia, first in 1955, losing to Richardson Dilworth, and again in 1971, losing to Frank Rizzo.

He was initially elected to Philadelphia's City Council in 1967, resigning his seat to run for Mayor in 1971. While a member of City Council, he served as a sideline reporter on Philadelphia Eagles radio broadcasts on WIP in 1969 and 1970. Longstreth was again elected to Council in 1983, defeating incumbent councilwoman Beatrice Chernock for the at-large seat he had vacated twelve years earlier to run for Mayor. He would remain in office until his death. During his tenure on Council, Longstreth helped support the efforts of Edmund Bacon to bring an urban renaissance to Philadelphia. He was also well known for wearing bow ties and argyle socks.

He suffered from Parkinson's disease, and died of a pulmonary embolism while on vacation in Naples, Florida.

Party political offices
| Preceded by Daniel A. Poling | Republican nominee for Mayor of Philadelphia; 1955 | Succeeded by Harold Stassen |
| Preceded by Arlen Specter | Republican nominee for Mayor of Philadelphia; 1971 | Succeeded by Thomas M. Foglietta |
