= Beatrice Chernock =

American educator and politician

Beatrice K. Chernock

Member of the Philadelphia City Council from the at-large district
- In office January 3, 1972 – January 2, 1984
- Preceded by: Thacher Longstreth
- Succeeded by: Thacher Longstreth

Personal details
- Born: Beatrice Kravitsky; May 30, 1908
- Died: December 13, 1994 (aged 86) Wynnewood, Pennsylvania, U.S.
- Party: Republican
- Spouse: Morris Chernock
- Education: Temple University (BS, M.Ed.)
- Occupation: Educator, Politician

Beatrice Kravistsky Chernock (May 30, 1908 – December 13, 1994) was an American educator and politician. She was a member of the Republican Party and served on the Philadelphia City Council from 1972 to 1984.

== Career ==
=== Education and media ===
Chernock graduated from the Philadelphia Normal School and later earned a bachelor's and a master's degree in education from Temple University. She became a teacher in the School District of Philadelphia and was later the principal at Charles W. Henry School in the city's Mount Airy neighborhood. Chernock also had an educational radio program called "Classroom of the Air" and a television series "Our America" on WHYY-TV, the local public television station.

=== Politics ===
In 1966, she made her first run for office, taking on incumbent Rep. William A. Barrett for the 1st congressional district. Running in a heavily Democratic district, Chernock was defeated in the race by more than 40,000 votes. In 1967, she ran for the 4th Councilmanic District seat held by Councilman George X. Schwartz. Schwartz prevailed by less than 5,000 votes.

Chernock won her first election to council in 1971 running from the at-large district for council, finishing second in the race for one of the two minority-party seats. Chernock won re-election two more times, in 1975 and 1979.

In the 1983 race, the city Republican leaders tried to persuade her to step down; however, she sought re-election. Joan Specter, the wife of Senator Arlen Specter and former councilman Thacher Longstreth, finished first and second in the race and sending Chernock to defeat.

Over the years, she served in various other capacities, as a member of the Urban League, the Civic Ballet and the Citizens Crime Commission of Philadelphia.

== Personal life ==
Her husband, Morris Chernock, was a local attorney who was active in politics, running for the Pennsylvania House of Representatives and also serving as a deputy attorney general in Pennsylvania.

Chernock died on December 13, 1994, at the age of 85 in Wynnewood, Pennsylvania.
