= Alfonzo Giordano =

American Police Officer

Alfonzo J. Giordano Jr. (February 7, 1937 – November 21, 2013) was a senior ranking officer in the Philadelphia Police Department (PPD). He achieved the rank of Inspector and was part of the homicide division before his retirement in 1982. Giordano was the "right hand man" of Frank Rizzo. He maintained the position of a high-ranking officer in the department throughout Rizzo's tenure as police commissioner and mayor. He was a member of the police force during the summer of 1964 when race riots devoured much of the city.

In 1986, he was convicted of accepting $57,000 in bribes. Giordano admitted receiving more than $45,000 in bribes in 1979, and more than $12,000 in early 1980 when he was commander of Philadelphia's East Division. The payoffs were from various operators of illegal lotteries and from sports betting operations that thrived in the blue-collar neighborhoods.
