= Amachi (organization) =

Amachi is an organization that partners with Big Brothers Big Sisters to provide mentors to children of prisoners. It is widely recognized as the nation's premier mentoring program for children of prisoners. John DiIulio, former director of the White House Office of Faith-Based and Community Initiatives devised the idea behind Amachi. Former Philadelphia mayor Wilson Goode directs the Amachi program. Amachi currently operates 210 mentoring programs in 48 states. Senator Hillary Clinton was chair of the Advisory Group of the Amachi project in Brooklyn, New York
