= 1979 Philadelphia mayoral election =

- November 6, 1979
- Turnout: 60% ▼5 pp
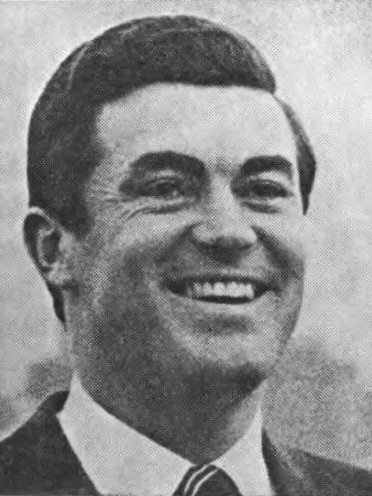

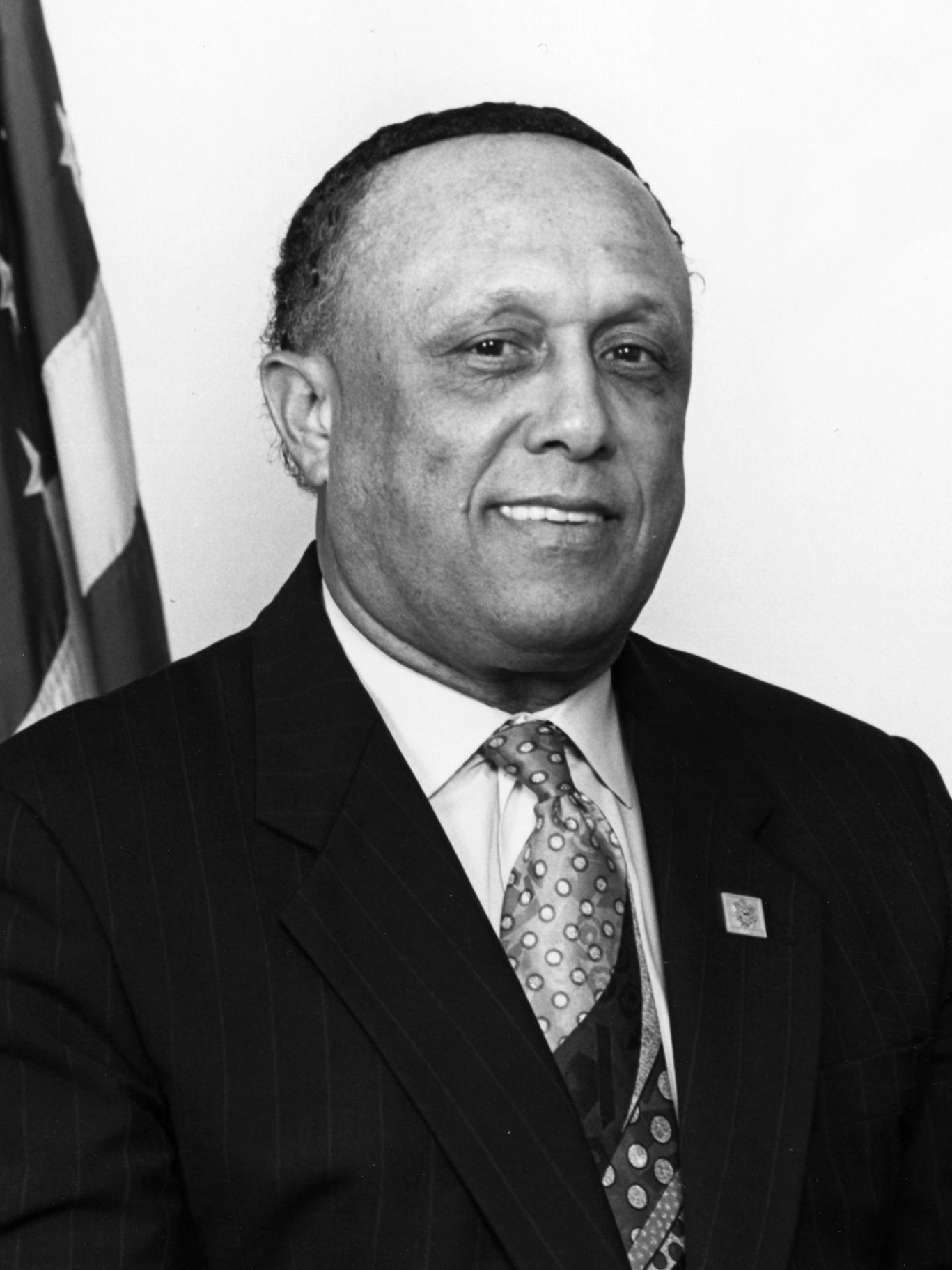
Nominee	William J. Green III	David W. Marston	Lucien Blackwell
Party	Democratic	Republican	Consumer
Popular vote	313,345	174,083	108,447
Percentage	52.59%	29.22%	18.20%
- Results by ward Green: 30–40% 40–50% 50–60% 60–70% Marston: 40–50% 50–60% Blackwell: 40–50% 50–60%
Mayor before election
Frank Rizzo
Democratic
Elected mayor
William J. Green III
Democratic

The 1979 Philadelphia mayoral election saw the election of William J. Green III.

Ahead of the election there had been an unsuccessful effort to amend the city charter to allow incumbent mayor Frank Rizzo to run for a third consecutive term.

== Democratic primary ==
=== Candidates ===
- Charles W. Bowser, former Deputy Mayor and independent candidate for mayor in 1975
- George G. Britt, Jr., management consultant and perennial candidate
- C. Douglas Clark
- William J. Green III, former U.S. Representative and candidate for U.S. Senate in 1976
- Frank Lomento, pretzel vendor and perennial candidate
- Ralph C. Morrone
- Ronald David Tinney
- Gil W. Veasey
- Inez Walker

==== Withdrew ====
- Albert V. Gaudiosi, former City Commerce Director
- William G. Klenk, City Controller

=== Results ===
Philadelphia mayoral Democratic primary, 1979
Party	Candidate	Votes	%
Democratic	William J. Green III	215,742	51.69
Democratic	Charles Bowser	178,376	42.74
Democratic	William Klenk (withdrawn)	10,628	2.55
Democratic	Inez Walker	2,816	0.68
Democratic	Gil Veasey	2,524	0.61
Democratic	George G. Britt, Jr.	2,482	0.60
Democratic	Frank Lomento	1,616	0.39
Democratic	Albert Gaudiosi (withdrawn)	1,502	0.36
Democratic	C. Douglas Clark	725	0.17
Democratic	Ralph C. Morrone	489	0.12
Democratic	Ronald David Tinney	460	0.11
Total votes		417,360	100.00

== Republican primary ==
=== Candidates ===
- David W. Marston, former U.S. Attorney and candidate for governor in 1978

=== Results ===
Marston was unopposed for the Republican nomination.

== General election ==
=== Candidates ===
- Lucien Blackwell, City Councilman from District 3 (Consumer)
- William J. Green III, former U.S. Representative and candidate for U.S. Senate in 1976 (Democratic)
- David W. Marston, former U.S. Attorney and candidate for governor in 1978 (Republican)

=== Results ===
1979 Philadelphia mayoral election
Party	Candidate	Votes	%
Democratic	William J. Green III	313,345	52.59
Republican	David W. Marston	174,083	29.22
Consumer	Lucien Blackwell	108,447	18.20
Total votes		595,875	100.00
