= 1983 Philadelphia mayoral election =

- November 8, 1983
- Turnout: 63.17% (registered voters) ▲3 pp 42.48% (total population)
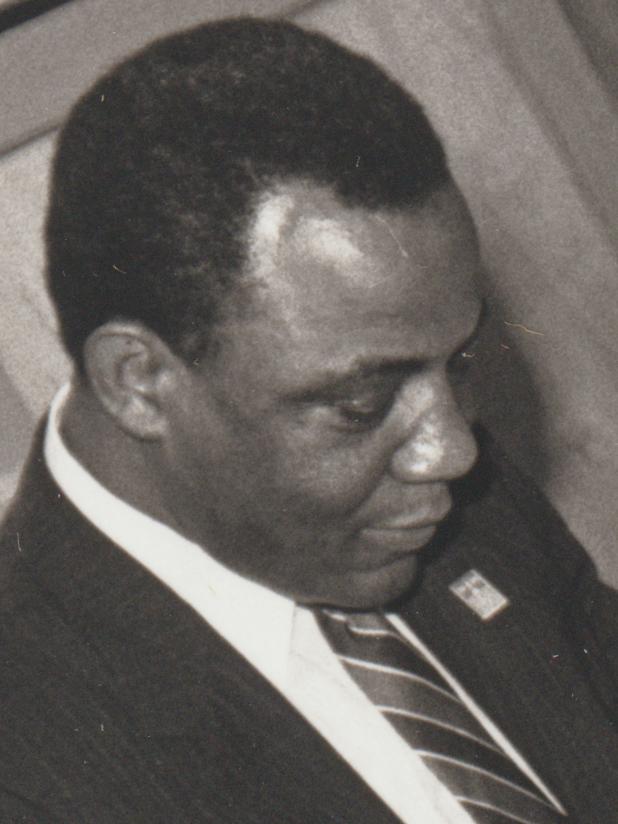

Nominee	Wilson Goode	John Egan	Thomas Leonard
Party	Democratic	Republican	Independent
Popular vote	396,266	263,742	57,146
Percentage	55.26%	36.78%	7.97%
- Results by ward Goode: 40–50% 50–60% 70–80% 80–90% >90% Egan: 50–60% 60–70% 70–80%
Mayor before election
William J. Green III
Democratic
Elected mayor
Wilson Goode
Democratic

The 1983 Philadelphia mayoral election saw the election of Wilson Goode.

Goode won the Democratic nomination by defeating former mayor Frank Rizzo, as well as several minor candidates, in the Democratic primary.

Goode was elected the first African American mayor of Philadelphia.

== Background ==
Before the election, a total of eighteen black mayors had been elected in United States cities with populations above 100,000.

At the time, there were incumbent black mayors in three of the other five United States cities with populations above 1 million people, Los Angeles (Tom Bradley), Chicago (Harold Washington), and Detroit (Coleman Young).

No Republican, and only Democrats, had been elected mayor since after the 1947 Philadelphia mayoral election.

At the time, blacks made up roughly 39% of registered voters in the city. White voters still outnumbered black voters 2 to 1.

Registered Democrats outnumbered registered Republicans in the city by 4 to 1.

== Democratic primary ==
Goode positioned himself as a candidate that could unite the city. This contrasted with many voters' perception that Rizzo had divided the city along racial and ethnic lines.

Goode was fresh-faced, with this being his first campaign for elected office. He was also perceived as an efficient public servant.

In the primary, more than 30% of white voters cast their votes for Goode.

Race never became a major topic of the campaign.

The race saw a record total of votes cast for a Democratic primary.

Ron Brown, the deputy chairman of the Democratic National Committee, appeared at Goode's primary election night victory party at the Philadelphia Convention Center to promise the national party's support for the general election. The victory party was also attended by black mayors from other United States cities, including Marion Barry of Washington, D.C.

=== Candidates ===
==== Declared ====
- George G. Britt, Jr., management consultant and perennial candidate
- Anthony G. Bateman, attorney and former assistant district attorney
- Stephen S. Douglas, former aide to Lyndon LaRouche and candidate for governor in 1980
- Wilson Goode, Philadelphia managing director
- Frank Lomento, pretzel vendor and perennial candidate
- Frank Rizzo, former mayor

==== Withdrew ====
- Thomas A. Leonard III, Philadelphia Register of Wills (to run as an independent)

=== Results ===
Philadelphia mayoral Democratic primary, 1983
Party	Candidate	Votes	%
Democratic	Wilson Goode	329,653	52.73
Democratic	Frank Rizzo	270,236	43.22
Democratic	Frank Lomento	18,947	3.03
Democratic	Stephen S. Douglas	3,006	0.48
Democratic	Anthony Bateman	2,920	0.47
Democratic	George Britt	439	0.07
Total votes		625,201	100.00

== Republican primary ==
=== Candidates ===
==== Declared ====
- Charles F. Dougherty, United States Representative for Pennsylvania's 4th congressional district
- John Egan, chairman of the Philadelphia Stock Exchange
- Tom Gola, former City Controller and Basketball Hall of Famer

=== Results ===
Philadelphia mayoral Republican primary, 1983
Party	Candidate	Votes	%
Republican	John Egan	38,920	45.30
Republican	Charles F. Dougherty	25,413	29.58
Republican	Tom Gola	21,581	25.25
Total votes		85,914	100.00

== Independents and third parties ==
=== Independent ===
- Thomas A. Leonard III, Philadelphia Register of Wills

== General election ==
Goode was able to project a managerial image for himself, and was able to make an image that was "nonthreatening" to white voters.

=== Results ===
Exit polling indicated that Goode received 98% of the support in black neighborhoods. An examination of sample voting districts indicated that Goode received between 27 and 28% of the vote in white neighborhoods. It was argued that a white candidate with the same credentials as Goode would likely have received 55% of the vote in the white neighborhoods.

1983 Philadelphia mayoral election
Party	Candidate	Votes	%
Democratic	Wilson Goode	396,266	55.26
Republican	John Egan	263,742	36.78
Independent	Thomas Leonard	57,146	7.97
Total votes		717,154	100.00
