= 1975 Philadelphia mayoral election =

- November 4, 1975
- Turnout: 65% ▼12 pp
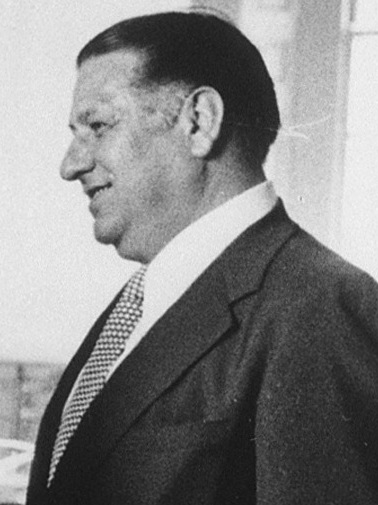

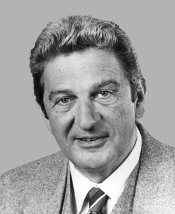
Nominee	Frank Rizzo	Charles W. Bowser	Tom Foglietta
Party	Democratic	Independent	Republican
Popular vote	311,879	134,334	101,001
Percentage	56.99%	24.55%	18.46%
- Results by ward Rizzo: 40–50% 50–60% 60–70% 70–80% 80–90% Bowser: 30–40% 40–50% 50–60% 60–70%
Mayor before election
Frank Rizzo
Democratic
Elected mayor
Frank Rizzo
Democratic

The 1975 Philadelphia mayoral election saw the reelection of Frank Rizzo.

Rizzo defeated African American leader Charles W. Bowser, who led an independent campaign, and Republican nominee Tom Foglietta.

== Democratic primary ==
=== Candidates ===
- Louis G. Hill, State Senator from the 36th district
- Muhammad Kenyatta, activist
- Frank Rizzo, incumbent Mayor

=== Results ===
Results by ward Rizzo: 50%–60%; 60%–70%; 70%–80%; 80%–90%; 90%–100%; Hill: 50%–60%; 60%–70%; 70%–80%; 80%–90%

Philadelphia mayoral Democratic primary, 1975
Party	Candidate	Votes	%
Democratic	Frank Rizzo (incumbent)	179,994	54.97
Democratic	Louis G. Hill	141,287	43.15
Democratic	Muhammad Kenyatta	6,133	1.87
Total votes		327,414	100.00

== Republican primary ==
=== Candidates ===
- Thomas Foglietta, At-large City Councilman

=== Results ===
Tom Foglietta was unopposed for the Republican nomination.

== General election ==
=== Candidates ===
- Charles Bowser, former Deputy Mayor (Independent)
- Thomas Foglietta, At-large City Councilman (Republican)
- Frank Rizzo, incumbent Mayor since 1972 (Democratic)

=== Results ===
1975 Philadelphia mayoral election
Party	Candidate	Votes	%
Democratic	Frank Rizzo (incumbent)	311,879	56.99
Independent	Charles W. Bowser	134,334	24.55
Republican	Thomas M. Foglietta	101,001	18.46
Total votes		547,214	100.00
