= Thomas M. Foglietta =

American politician and diplomat

Tom Foglietta
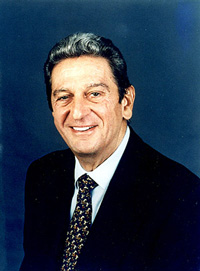

United States Ambassador to Italy
- In office December 11, 1997 – October 1, 2001
- President: Bill Clinton; George W. Bush
- Preceded by: Reginald Bartholomew
- Succeeded by: Mel Sembler

Member of the U.S. House of Representatives from Pennsylvania's 1st district
- In office January 3, 1981 – November 11, 1997
- Preceded by: Michael Myers
- Succeeded by: Bob Brady

Member of the Philadelphia City Council from the at-large district
- In office January 2, 1956 – January 5, 1976
- Preceded by: Seat created
- Succeeded by: Ethel D. Allen

Personal details
- Born: December 3, 1928 Philadelphia, Pennsylvania, U.S.
- Died: November 13, 2004 (aged 75) Philadelphia, Pennsylvania, U.S.
- Resting place: Holy Cross Cemetery, Yeadon, Pennsylvania
- Party: Democratic (after 1980)
- Other political affiliations: Republican (before 1980); Independent (1980)
- Education: Saint Joseph's University

Thomas Michael Foglietta (December 3, 1928 – November 13, 2004) was an American politician and diplomat. He represented Pennsylvania in the House of Representatives from 1981 to 1997, and later served as United States Ambassador to Italy from December 1997 to October 2001.

== Background ==
Foglietta was born on December 3, 1928, in a house on 7th and Clymer Streets in South Philadelphia, and graduated from South Catholic High School in the city. Foglietta's father, Michael, was a Republican committeeman, ward leader and clerk of quarter sessions who was ultimately elected to the Philadelphia City Council in 1947. He received his bachelor's degree from Saint Joseph's University in Philadelphia in 1949, and his Juris Doctor from the Temple Law School in 1952. After graduating from law school, he entered private practice.

In 1955, Foglietta ran for Philadelphia City Council and won, becoming the youngest person ever elected to that body. Foglietta served on the council for 20 years. In 1975, he ran for mayor of Philadelphia, coming in third place to Frank Rizzo. Following his defeat, Foglietta became a regional director for the U.S. Department of Labor.

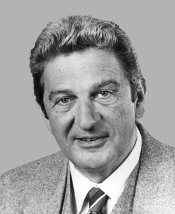
Foglietta's official portrait in the 102nd Congress, 1991.

== Congressional career ==
In the 1980 elections, Foglietta won in Pennsylvania's 1st Congressional District, running as an independent. Foglietta defeated Congressman Michael "Ozzie" Myers who had been convicted in the Abscam bribery scandal. Following his election, Foglietta switched parties and became a Democrat, stating "I belonged to the progressive faction of the Republican Party — a faction that is no longer in existence." In Congress, Foglietta concentrated his energies on foreign affairs and the preservation of the Philadelphia Navy Yard, which was slated for closure by the Base Realignment and Closure Commission. In 1985 a melee broke out at Seoul Airport when Foglietta accompanied South Korean dissident Kim Dae Jung back home. The two formed a lifelong friendship and in 1999, Foglietta received a South Korean human rights award for supporting democracy there, while Kim received Philadelphia's Liberty Medal.

Foglietta later served on the House Appropriations Committee, where he worked to secure federal funding for the restoration of various Philadelphia historic sites, including Independence Hall and Washington Square in Philadelphia. Foglietta was also well known for founding the Congressional Urban Caucus, a legislative service organization dedicated to promoting urban policy issues in the House.

On election day in 1984, Foglietta successfully ran down a purse-snatcher after witnessing two boys rob an 84-year-old woman.

== Ambassador to Italy ==
Foglietta served in the House until 1997, when he resigned and was appointed ambassador to Italy by President Bill Clinton. Upon his nomination, the Philadelphia Daily News published an editorial that stated: "In 68 years, Thomas Michael Foglietta will have made it from a rowhouse at 7th and Clymer to the embassy in Rome on a smile and a trustworthy handshake. Which, as it turns out, is an excellent way to travel."

The 1998 Cavalese cable car disaster happened during his tenure in Rome; in the accident, a U.S. military aircraft flew too low, severing a gondola cable, resulting in the deaths of 20 skiers. Foglietta visited the accident site and knelt in prayer, offering apologies on behalf of the United States. An editorial in La Repubblica, an Italian newspaper remarked: "Yesterday it was up to Ambassador Thomas Foglietta to do something we Italians do less and less. Foglietta expressed his apologies on behalf of President Clinton and the American people for that terrible tragedy and kneeled down in prayer for the poor victims."

== Death ==
On November 13, 2004, Foglietta died from complications of shoulder surgery at Thomas Jefferson University Hospital in Philadelphia, at the age of 75.

== See also ==
- History of Italian Americans in Philadelphia

Diplomatic posts
Preceded by Reginald Bartholomew	United States Ambassador to Italy; 1997–2001	Succeeded by Mel Sembler
U.S. House of Representatives
Preceded by Ozzie Myers	Member of the U.S. House of Representatives from Pennsylvania's 1st congressional district 1981–1997	Succeeded by Bob Brady
Philadelphia City Council
Preceded by Seat Created	Member of the Philadelphia City Council for the At-Large District; 1956–1976	Succeeded by Ethel D. Allen
