= Frank Rizzo =

American police officer and politician (1920–1991)

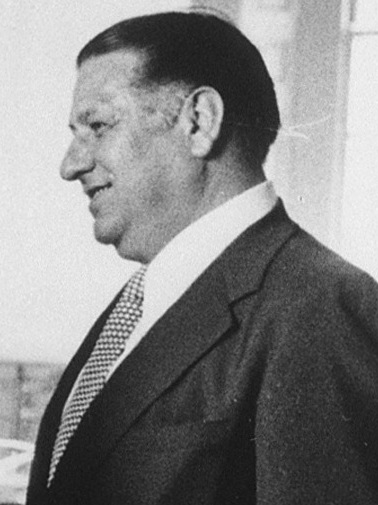
- Rizzo in 1972

93rd Mayor of Philadelphia
- In office January 3, 1972 – January 7, 1980
- Preceded by: James Tate
- Succeeded by: William J. Green III

Commissioner of the Philadelphia Police Department
- In office April 10, 1967 – February 2, 1971
- Preceded by: Edward Bell
- Succeeded by: Joseph O'Neil

Personal details
- Born: Francis Lazarro Rizzo; October 23, 1920 Philadelphia, Pennsylvania, U.S.
- Died: July 16, 1991 (aged 70) Philadelphia, Pennsylvania, U.S.
- Resting place: Holy Sepulchre Cemetery, Cheltenham Township, Pennsylvania, U.S.
- Party: Democratic (1971–1986); Republican (1986–1991)
- Spouse: Carmella Silvestri (m. 1942)
- Children: 2, including Frank Jr.

Military service
- Allegiance: United States
- Branch/service: United States Navy
- Years of service: 1938–1939
- Rank: Seaman

Francis Lazarro Rizzo (October 23, 1920 – July 16, 1991) was an American police officer and politician. He served as commissioner of the Philadelphia Police Department (PPD) from 1967 to 1971 and mayor of Philadelphia from 1972 to 1980. He was a member of the Democratic Party throughout the entirety of his career in public office. He switched to the Republican Party in 1986 and campaigned as a Republican for the final five years of his life.

Rizzo was born to an Italian-American family in South Philadelphia, and joined the Philadelphia Police Department as an officer in 1943. He rose to public prominence as police commissioner, before seeking the mayor's office in 1971. He was re-elected in 1975.

A polarizing figure during his lifetime, Rizzo's legacy has come under greater scrutiny in the years since his death due to the prevalence of racism and brutality within the Philadelphia Police Department. Before, during, and after Rizzo's tenure as police commissioner, the PPD engaged in patterns of police misconduct, in particular toward members of the black community. The patterns of police brutality were documented in a Pulitzer Prize-winning Philadelphia Inquirer series by William K. Marimow and Jon Neuman in 1977. As mayor, Rizzo, like many of his contemporaries, was opposed to the construction of public housing in established neighborhoods, most of which at the time housed majority-white populations.

Rizzo was barred from running for a third consecutive term as mayor by Philadelphia's city charter. He attempted to vote in a charter change to allow him to attempt a run for reelection but was soundly defeated after urging supporters to "vote white", which he later admitted was "a poor choice of words". He unsuccessfully ran for another term in 1983 and 1987. In 1991, he sought the mayoralty again, but died during the election campaign. Rizzo became the subject of multiple memorials throughout Philadelphia, including a statue in Center City. It was removed in 2020, after it was vandalized during the George Floyd protests.

== Early life ==
Rizzo was born in Philadelphia, where his father Rafael was a police officer. He grew up in a South Philadelphia row house neighborhood. During his senior year he dropped out of Southern High School; he later earned a high school equivalency diploma and took government courses at the Fels Institute of Government.

Enlisting in the United States Navy, Rizzo served on the USS Houston cruiser for 19 months before being medically discharged due to diabetes insipidus. Returning to Philadelphia, Rizzo worked for Midvale Steel, helping manufacture naval guns in the lead-up to World War II. In 1942, Rizzo married Carmella Silvestri, and they had a son and a daughter. Their son, Frank Rizzo Jr., was a Republican member of the Philadelphia City Council from 1996 to 2012.

== Police commissioner ==
Rizzo joined the Philadelphia Police Department (PPD) in 1943, rising through the ranks to become captain of the 19th district. In 1967, Rizzo was appointed commissioner by Mayor James Tate. Through various challenges, racial divisions in particular, facing the city, Tate continued to support Rizzo as police commissioner. He was boisterous and brooding, particularly to media. A biography of Rizzo, with an introduction written by future police commissioner John Timoney, recounted: "Of one group of anti-police demonstrators, he is reported to have said, 'Just wait: After November, you'll have a front row seat because when I'm finished with them, I'll make Attila the Hun look like a faggot.'" A reporter who covered the Rizzo years, Andrea Mitchell, recounted routinely brutish behavior at the force as part of a broad pattern of Rizzo bravado.

Rizzo resigned as commissioner in 1971 to run for mayor.

=== Relationship with black Americans ===
Rizzo's relationship with Philadelphia's black community was volatile, with the PPD's reputation suffering among black people. During Rizzo's tenure as division captain and commissioner, critics often charged that he was racially motivated, targeting activities in black neighborhoods.

It was during Rizzo's tenure as deputy commissioner that black and white officers assigned to the city's predominantly black neighborhoods worked in tandem in an attempt to reduce friction between civilians and police forces. As commissioner, Rizzo's department had one of the largest percentages of black officers among large U.S. police departments, with 20% in 1968, at a time when other departments had little if any success in recruiting black people.

However, hiring of black officers declined sharply during Rizzo's tenure as police commissioner. From 1966 to 1970, the percentage of black police officers hired declined from 27.5% to 7.7%. This precipitated a decline in the overall proportion of black Philadelphia police officers: from 21% in 1967 to 18% in 1971.

In August 1970, after a Fairmount Park Police Officer was murdered, Rizzo raided the Philadelphia offices of the Black Panther Party. During the raid, conducted one week before the Panthers convened the Revolutionary People's Constitutional Convention at Temple University, officers performed a strip-search on the arrested Panthers before cameras. The picture ran on the front page of the Philadelphia Daily News and was seen around the world. Days later the charges against the Panthers were dropped for lack of evidence. Subsequently, the search was ruled illegal. Russell Shoatz and four others were ultimately convicted of this murder.

As mayor, Rizzo's handling of the first MOVE incident in 1978 has been interpreted as supporting the charge of racism. When members of the group refused entrance to city inspectors, Rizzo evicted them through armed police action. Snipers were positioned around the house and the compound was blockaded by 1,000 police officers refusing any entry of food or water. When the police finally attempted to lay siege to the compound, officer James Ramp was killed in the conflict, and 16 other police and firefighters injured. Though MOVE members disagreed, it was claimed that Officer James Ramp was killed by MOVE gunfire. Eventually, the standoff was resolved without further loss of life, and the members of MOVE were arrested. One unarmed MOVE member, Delbert Africa, was beaten by multiple officers while leaving the MOVE house with his hands up. The incident as captured by the local news media shows Africa being dragged by his hair, struck with an officer's helmet, and kicked in the face and groin once on the ground.

== Mayor of Philadelphia ==
=== Election to first term ===
Although not being elected yet, Rizzo essentially functioned as mayor before the election, as Mayor James Tate had announced on television that he was retiring and naming Rizzo "de facto" mayor of Philadelphia. Asked if this was legal, Tate only laughed and replied that he was retiring. Rizzo finally ran for mayor in 1971. That year, he faced Democratic mayoral candidates Rep. William J. Green III, a former Democratic city chairman; State Rep. Hardy Williams; and former city councilman David Cohen. Cohen withdrew from the race and endorsed Green. Rizzo then defeated Green and Williams in the Democratic primary.

Running as a Democrat in the November 1971 election, Rizzo defeated former (and future) Councilman-at-Large and Chamber of Commerce President Thacher Longstreth. Unlike his opponents, Rizzo did not issue campaign position papers; he thought his slogan, "firm but fair," sufficiently explained his expected role.

=== First term ===
Rizzo was not without adversaries, even at the start of his first term. The Evening Bulletin interviewed former Mayor and School Board President Richardson Dilworth about allegations he made in the San Francisco Chronicle that Rizzo had used the police for political espionage; Dilworth's allegations launched a new and enduring feud between the two.

Grateful for the positive publicity local media had given him as police commissioner, Rizzo awarded jobs to two dozen local reporters. This quid pro quo caused suspicion and, more significantly, removed Rizzo's most enthusiastic supporters from the media. The change in ownership of The Philadelphia Inquirer and Daily News also changed the bias of media coverage. The two newspapers had previously been owned by the Annenberg family, and both had given Commissioner Rizzo broad and favorable coverage. But the papers were sold to Knight Newspapers, later Knight Ridder. By the start of Rizzo's first term, the staff of the Inquirer, friendly to Rizzo, had largely been supplanted by younger journalists, led by one of the nation's most aggressive young editors, Eugene Roberts, formerly national editor of The New York Times. Roberts and his staff emphasized investigative reporting, and the Rizzo administration, among other local institutions, was the subject of many critical stories by the Times.

A conservative Democrat, Rizzo supported the 1972 reelection campaign of Republican president Richard Nixon. Rizzo praised Nixon as "the greatest president this country [has] ever had." Rewarding Rizzo's support, the victorious Nixon granted more federal funding to Philadelphia. But the action alienated many of Rizzo's supporters in his own party. The Democratic city committee, Democrats on the city council, and party chairman Peter Camiel viewed Rizzo's action as a betrayal.

==== Lie detector scandal (1973) ====
Rizzo clashed with the media well into his term. He held frequent press conferences in which he discussed matters in colorful and often bombastic language. After Camiel accused Rizzo of offering patronage in exchange for influencing the choice of candidates for district attorney and city comptroller, Rizzo called Camiel a liar. A reporter from the Philadelphia Daily News asked Rizzo if he would submit to a polygraph test to prove Camiel was lying. Rizzo agreed, as did Camiel. "If this machine says a man lied, he lied," Rizzo famously said before the test. But the polygraph indicated that Rizzo had lied and Camiel had not. The scandal ended any hope Rizzo had of becoming governor. He discontinued his press conferences for nearly two years and attempted to rebuild his public support by appealing directly to voters.

=== Election to second term ===
Just wait after November you'll have a front row seat because I'm going to make Attila the Hun look like a faggot.

— Rizzo, during his 1975 reelection campaign

In the 1975 Democratic primary, Rizzo defeated State Senator Louis G. Hill, Dilworth's nephew, who was supported by Camiel. In the November election, Rizzo defeated independent candidate Charles Bowser, a leading black attorney and former City Councilman at Large, and Thomas M. Foglietta, who later represented a large portion of the city in Congress.

=== Second term ===
During Rizzo's second term, black community activist and future Philadelphia Mayor W. Wilson Goode sued the city in federal court, alleging racial discrimination in the police and fire departments. The fire department was headed by Joseph Rizzo, the mayor's brother. The suit led to the adoption of the influential "Philadelphia Plan", calling for affirmative action in civil service hiring and promotions.

An interesting feature of Rizzo's mayoralty was the establishment and mayor sanctioning of a publicly funded "anti-defamation agency" to combat pejorative remarks about Philadelphia. The agency's best-publicized action was the boycott of S.O.S. Soap Pads, after a television commercial broadcast nationally referred to the city disparagingly. The manufacturer withdrew the offending commercial.

Construction began on The Gallery at Market East shopping mall and the Center City Commuter Connection, a commuter tunnel that connected and combined the city's old and historically independent railroad systems, the Reading Railroad and the Pennsylvania Railroad.

The Philadelphia Gas Works, known locally as PGW, had been managed by a private company. During Rizzo's tenure, it was taken over by the city. PGW then implemented senior citizens discounts and generous municipal labor contracts and expanded patronage hiring.

During Rizzo's second term, two reporters at The Philadelphia Inquirer, William K. Marimow and Jon Neuman, began a long series about Philadelphia police department's patterns of police brutality, intimidation, coercion and disregard for constitutional rights. The series won a Pulitzer Prize for the newspaper. This series was the basis of the 2000 film The Thin Blue Lie, in which Rizzo was portrayed by Paul Sorvino.

=== Tax increase and recall attempt ===
In his successful second mayoral campaign in 1975, Rizzo campaigned under the slogan, "He held the line on taxes". Soon after the election, he persuaded City Council to increase the city's wage tax from 3.31% to 4.31%, one of the highest in the nation. The action infuriated Rizzo's opponents and led fiscal conservatives to join them in attempting to recall Rizzo from the mayor's office. Americans for Democratic Action, the liberal activist group that had played a key role in moving Philadelphia from Republican to Democratic control in the late 1940s and early 1950s, gathered over 210,000 signatures in support of the recall effort. Polls showed Rizzo losing by a wide margin. Rizzo's allies counterattacked by challenging the validity of the signatures as well as the recall procedure itself. The Pennsylvania Supreme Court ultimately declared the Charter's recall provision unconstitutional in a 4-3 decision. Justice Robert N. C. Nix Jr., who had been elected to the court with Rizzo's support in 1971, wrote a concurring opinion in Rizzo's favor.

Rizzo opponents, while greatly disheartened, elected Edward G. Rendell as district attorney in 1977 and organized a campaign to elect anti-Rizzo Democratic committee persons and elected officials in the 1978 primaries.

=== Attempt for third consecutive term ===
Facing Philadelphia's two consecutive term limit, Rizzo persuaded the Philadelphia City Council to place a charter change question on the ballot in 1978 that would have allowed him to run for a third consecutive term in 1979. In a record turnout for a Philadelphia municipal election, Philadelphians voted two to one against the change, blocking Rizzo from running in 1979. In that election, Republican gubernatorial candidate Dick Thornburgh won a larger-than-expected percentage of the black vote (for a Republican) and the governorship against a heavily favored Democratic opponent. The anti-charter change organization soon supported a "Clean Sweep" ticket for municipal offices in 1979, including former Rep. William J. Green III, who was elected mayor. Later on Rizzo tried to run again; this time his main Democratic opponent was the first black mayor of Philadelphia, Wilson Goode. During this run he tried to connect more with Philadelphia's black population, which proved ineffectual as he won only three percent of the black vote and lost to Goode in a closely contested election.

=== Historical assessment ===
Rizzo's mayoralty has received retrospective criticism for his alleged racism and the police brutality that took place under his watch.

A 1985 survey of historians, political scientists and urban experts conducted by Melvin G. Holli of the University of Illinois at Chicago saw Rizzo ranked as the worst American big-city mayor in office since 1820. A 1993 edition of Holli's survey saw Rizzo ranked as the fifth-worst American big-city mayor to serve in office since 1820. When the latter survey was limited only to mayors that were in office after 1960, the results saw Rizzo ranked as the absolute worst.

== Lawsuits ==
Rizzo's police department, Rizzo's mayoral administration, and Rizzo personally faced dozens of lawsuits alleging abuses ranging from physical assault to systemic discrimination and harassment, culminating in Philadelphia's first mayoral recall effort. A 1968 lawsuit charged Rizzo and the Fairmount Parks commission in a class action suit, alleging targeted harassment of "hippies" in Rittenhouse Square. In 1973, a police accountability group alleged Rizzo's responsibility in systemic police discrimination and harassment of Philadelphia minority communities, seeking the establishment of a civilian oversight organization. Another 1973 civil rights action charged Rizzo with assault and conspiracy against political protestors in activities related to his mayoral campaign.

Rizzo was also named in a protracted court battle over Whitman Park, a bitterly contested public housing project in South Philadelphia. Upon taking office in 1971, Mayor Rizzo famously proclaimed that Whitman Park would never be built. Rizzo ultimately lost in court in 1979, as Federal District Judge Raymond J. Broderick cited racist motivations in blocking the project.

== Post-mayoral career ==
Between 1983 and 1986, Rizzo served as a security consultant at the Philadelphia Gas Works, controversially, as he drew a city pension at the same time, and hosted one of Philadelphia's most popular radio talk shows, a tradition later emulated by his son, Republican City Councilman Frank Rizzo Jr.

In 1980, Rizzo vandalized an NBC KYW-TV camera while they were stationed in a van outside his house in Chestnut Hill. He was surrounded by several police officers who did nothing to restrain him. When KYW reporter Stan Bohrman tried to interview him later over the incident, Rizzo offered to fight him and repeatedly called him a "crumb bum" and a "crumb creep lush coward".

He ran unsuccessfully for the Democratic nomination for mayor in 1983, losing to Wilson Goode, who in turn won the mayoral election. In 1986, he became a Republican and ran in the mayoral election of 1987, once again losing to Goode, 49% to 51%.

In 1991, he set out to run for mayor again. He won the Republican primary against former Philadelphia District Attorney (and later chief justice of the Pennsylvania Supreme Court) Ronald D. Castille.

== Death ==
During his 1991 mayoral campaign against the Democratic candidate, former District Attorney (and later two-term Pennsylvania Governor) Edward G. Rendell, Rizzo suffered a fatal heart attack at his campaign headquarters on July 16 at around 1:15 p.m. EDT, and was pronounced dead at Thomas Jefferson University Hospital at 2:12 p.m., at the age of 70.

Joseph M. Egan Jr. then replaced Rizzo as the Republican nominee. Rendell went on to win the November election and served two terms as mayor.

== Funeral and memorials ==
Rizzo's funeral was purported to be the largest in the history of Philadelphia, with people lining the streets of the motorcade from the Cathedral Basilica of Saints Peter and Paul to the cemetery. He was interred at Holy Sepulchre Cemetery in Cheltenham Township, Pennsylvania.

In his hometown neighborhood of South Philadelphia, a mural portrait of Rizzo was located at the Italian Market on Ninth Street. The mural had been described as "Philadelphia's most commonly defaced piece of public art". The mural was painted over on June 7, 2020, at the request of Mural Arts, a nonprofit that maintained the mural.

A statue of Mayor Rizzo waving in greeting, created by sculptor Zenos Frudakis, used to stand in front of Philadelphia's Municipal Services Building. The 10-foot-high (3.0 m) statue was paid for by private contributions. Following the aftermath of the 2017 Unite the Right rally in Charlottesville, Virginia, Councilwoman Helen Gym posted on Twitter, "All around the country, we're fighting to remove the monuments to slavery & racism. Philly, we have work to do. Take the Rizzo statue down". Gym's comments started a public debate about the future of the Rizzo statue and mural. Mayor Jim Kenney was open to the possibility, stating that "it is time to discuss the future" of the monument. On November 4, 2017, Mayor Kenney announced that the statue would be moved to a new location, though it subsequently remained in place. In May 2020, the statue was vandalized during protests in response to the murder of George Floyd. Days later on the night of June 2, the statue was removed. Mayor Jim Kenney stated "The statue is a deplorable monument to racism, bigotry, and police brutality for members of the black community, the LGBTQ community, and many others. The treatment of these communities under Mr. Rizzo's leadership was among the worst periods in Philadelphia's history."

Rizzo was portrayed in The Thin Blue Lie by Paul Sorvino, The Irishman by Gino Cafarelli and The Hunt for the Unicorn Killer by Louis Di Bianco. Rizzo is also the model and inspiration behind the Jerry Carlucci character in the Badge of Honor book series.

== Bibliography ==
The 1977 book The Cop Who Would Be King, by Philadelphia Bulletin journalists Joseph R. Daughen and Peter Binzen, is widely considered the most authoritative account of Frank Rizzo's rise to power. In 1993, sports journalist Sal Paolantonio wrote a book about Rizzo entitled Rizzo: The Last Big Man In Big City America. In 2015 the play Rizzo by Bruce Graham based on Paolantonio's book premiered at Theatre Exile in Philadelphia. More critical comments on Rizzo's tenure as police commissioner and mayor are found in Andrea Mitchell's book Talking Back. Phyllis Kaniss's The Media and the Mayor's Race is an analysis of local journalistic coverage of Rizzo's last campaign; it describes the tactics he used against Castille and planned to use against Rendell.

Timothy J. Lombardo's book Blue-Collar Conservatism: Frank Rizzo's Philadelphia and Populist Politics (University of Pennsylvania Press, 2018) offers a serious examination of Rizzo's career and the rise of blue-collar conservatism in the late 20th century.

== See also ==
- Alfonzo Giordano
- History of Italian Americans in Philadelphia
- List of monument and memorial controversies in the United States

Police appointments
Preceded by Edward Bell	Commissioner of the Philadelphia Police Department; 1967–1971	Succeeded by Joseph O'Neil
Political offices
Preceded by James Tate	Mayor of Philadelphia; 1972–1980	Succeeded by William J. Green III
