= William J. Green III =

American politician (born 1938)

Bill Green
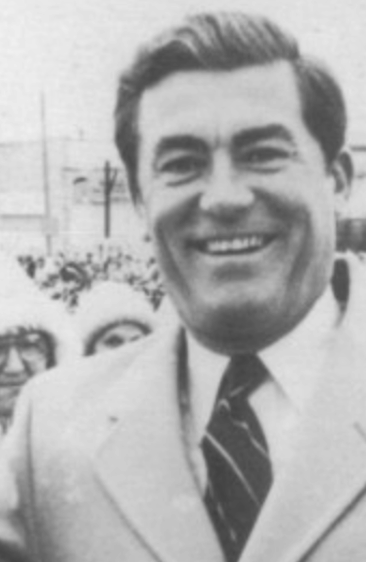

94th Mayor of Philadelphia
- In office January 7, 1980 – January 2, 1984
- Preceded by: Frank Rizzo
- Succeeded by: Wilson Goode

Chair of the Philadelphia Democratic Party
- In office December 1, 1967 – December 26, 1969
- Preceded by: Frank Smith
- Succeeded by: Peter Camiel

Member of the U.S. House of Representatives from Pennsylvania
- In office April 28, 1964 – January 3, 1977
- Preceded by: William J. Green Jr.
- Succeeded by: Raymond Lederer
- Constituency: 5th district (1964–1973); 3rd district (1973–1977)

Personal details
- Born: William Joseph Green III; June 24, 1938 (age 88) Philadelphia, Pennsylvania, U.S.
- Party: Democratic
- Spouse: Patricia Green
- Children: 4, including Bill
- Relatives: William J. Green Jr. (father)
- Education: Saint Joseph's University (BS); Villanova University (JD)

William Joseph Green III (born June 24, 1938) is an American politician from Pennsylvania. A Democrat, Green served in the U.S. House of Representatives from 1964 to 1977 and as the 94th mayor of Philadelphia from 1980 to 1984. He is the youngest person ever elected to congress from Pennsylvania, having been elected at the age of 25.

== Youth ==
Green grew up in the Kensington neighborhood's 33rd Ward with his brothers and sisters Mary, Anne, Michael, Dennis and Patrick. His father, William J. Green Jr., the dean of U.S. congressmen from Philadelphia at his death, was among the most powerful Democratic members of the U.S. House. This upbringing gave Green and his siblings extraordinary access to top Democratic Party leaders. The Harry Truman Presidential Library website, for instance, contains a picture of the Green family meeting with Harry Truman in the White House. And the records of the administration of President John F. Kennedy frequently mention the senior Green as well.

William J. Green III attended St. Joseph's Prep School and received his bachelor's degree from Saint Joseph's University in 1960. He also graduated from Villanova Law School.

== Congressional career ==
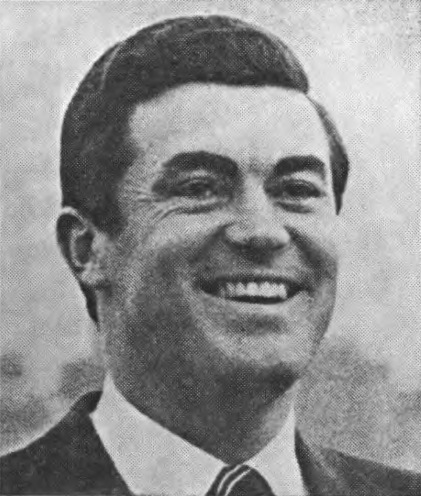
Green as a congressman.

At the age of 25, Green was elected as a Democrat in a special election on April 28, 1964, to the Eighty-eighth Congress to fill the vacancy caused by the death of his father. He was reelected to six successive Congresses and served until January 3, 1977.

Upon his election to Congress, Green and his wife Pat moved to Frankford. As a congressman in Lyndon B. Johnson's "Great Society" era, Green assumed leadership on issues such as meat inspection, rat control, and tax reform and led the charge in Congress to eliminate the oil depletion allowance. He voted for the Voting Rights Act of 1965, the Fair Housing Act of 1968, the Immigration Reform Act of 1965, and the Medicare Act of 1965, other pieces of President Johnson's sweeping program of domestic reform, and was one of the original cosponsors of the Equal Rights Amendment. He had a 100 percent rating from the AFL-CIO, the NAACP, and the Americans for Democratic Action for his fourteen years in Congress.

Green served from December 1967, through December 1969, in his father's old post as Democratic city chairman but resigned after the Democratic City Committee refused to adopt his reform plan following a Republican sweep led by District Attorney and future U.S. Senator Arlen Specter.

He was an unsuccessful candidate for the Democratic nomination for mayor of Philadelphia in 1971, losing to former Police Commissioner Frank Rizzo's "law and order" candidacy. In the 1972 congressional redistricting, Green's opponents tried to gerrymander him out of his seat, placing him in the same district as Congressman James Byrne, in office since 1952. The newly merged district had voted heavily for Rizzo in the mayoral election and had been represented mainly by Byrne, for whom Rizzo campaigned actively. The grassroots organization Green put together for his mayoral campaign, however, enabled him to defeat Byrne decisively. He was then easily re-elected in the overwhelmingly Democratic year of 1974.

== Senate campaign ==
In 1976, U.S. Senator Hugh Scott, the Senate Republican leader, announced his retirement after being tarred in a campaign finance scandal and facing pressure from fellow Republicans Arlen Specter and John Heinz, who each coveted his seat. Green did not seek re-election to the House, and instead sought Scott's Senate seat.

Backed by Governor Milton Shapp, Green won the Democratic nomination for the seat, defeating State Senator Jeanette Reibman of Northampton County. Green's fundraising skills, however, proved to be no match for the millions available to Heinz from his personal fortune after he defeated Arlen Specter in the Republican Senate primary. Heinz blasted Green for voting against defense budgets Green considered too expensive, implying that Green was weak on U.S. defense. Political cartoons of the time show Heinz pouring money from a giant ketchup bottle over Green's head. Even so, and with Carter at the top of the Democratic ticket, Heinz barely reversed the Democratic tide and defeated Green, 52–48 percent.

After losing to Heinz, Green was admitted to the Pennsylvania bar, and he joined the now-defunct Philadelphia law firm Wolf, Block, Schorr & Solis-Cohen, known for its lobbying and government relations practice. He moved out of his district to the Germantown section of Philadelphia and into the home of his mother-in-law, Margaret Sharpless Kirk, with his wife and children. They later moved to Chestnut Hill.

== As mayor ==
He declined to run in the 1978 gubernatorial election but won the Democratic nomination for Mayor of Philadelphia in 1979, defeating runner-up Charles Bowser, former deputy mayor. Other candidates for the nomination, former City Controller William Klenk and former Commerce Director Al Gaudiosi, withdrew near the end of the primary.

In the general election, Green defeated Republican David Marston, a former United States Attorney, and former City Councilman Lucien Blackwell, a future U.S. Congressman and the Consumer Party nominee, to win election as mayor.

As mayor, Green was often forced by circumstances to make difficult and unpopular choices. He was required to balance a city budget still at a record high $285 million deficit inherited from Mayor Rizzo, the largest ever inherited by an incoming Philadelphia mayor. The resulting disputes with municipal labor unions, open battles with City Council, quiet disputes with campaign contributors, and an adversarial relationship with the mass media sapped his morale. "Reporters are the type of people who tore the wings off flies when they were young," he complained at the time. His efforts to balance the budget were successful, however, and for the first time in years new businesses were choosing to relocate to Philadelphia, which won a national marketing award during the Green administration. In a city divided by race, Green appointed the first African American managing director, future Mayor Wilson Goode, aggressively supported Joseph Coleman as the first African American president of City Council, and appointed the first African American superintendent of the Philadelphia public schools, Constance Clayton. Another member of his cabinet was the city's first female city solicitor, Marilyn Z. Kutler. The Green administration is also remembered for having brought young talent into the City government: Chaka Fattah received his first government job in Green's Commerce Department, one headed by Dick Doran; Ed Deseve, Green's finance director, went on to head the U.S. Office of Management and the Budget in the administration of President Bill Clinton; Bill Marrazo, a Green commissioner of the Philadelphia Water Department, is now president of WHYY, Philadelphia's principal public television station.

Green decided not to seek re-election during the Democratic primary and concentrated on his family when his wife Patricia became pregnant. Pat Green was 40 and Green feared for her health and the health of his unborn child if she faced the stress of a political campaign during the pregnancy. After his youngest child, Maura Elizabeth Green, was born healthy near the end of his term, Green joked, "I am the winner" of the 1983 mayoral contest.

Material in Mayor Green's city archives files include correspondence, reports, and other materials relating to the various city departments, boards, commissions, and other city offices. Information is also available on the General Business Tax, the Mayor's Tax Committee, the Mayor's Scholarship Program of 1979–1980, cable TV, Century IV celebration, CETA, the bicentennial of the U.S. Constitution, Delaware Valley Regional Planning Commission, energy, the Philadelphia Federation of Teachers Strike of 1981, the Educational Nomination Panel of 1981–1982, Mayor's and Cabinet members' schedules for 1980–1982, Conversation Hall renovations that were started by Green, council legislation, Freedom Festival, among many other topics.

== Post-mayoral career ==
After his term as Mayor expired, Green practiced law, opened two restaurants in the emerging Manayunk section of Philadelphia, and passed up opportunities to run for the U.S. Senate in 1986 and 1991. He established himself as a Washington, D.C., lobbyist and purchased a home in suburban Virginia.

In the late 1980s, the 1990s, and the 2000s, Green pursued a successful career as vice president of government relations for MacAndrews & Forbes, a large holding company that includes Revlon.

In 2003, Green retired from MacAndrews & Forbes and returned with his wife to Philadelphia, where he has since kept a low political profile. Some of his associates while he was mayor have dominated Republican mayoral politics in the decades since he has left office, but none has won election in an overwhelmingly Democratic city.

His son, William J. "Bill" Green, IV, was elected to Philadelphia City Council in 2007.

U.S. House of Representatives
Preceded by Bill Green	Member of the U.S. House of Representatives from Pennsylvania's 5th congressional district 1964–1973	Succeeded by John Ware
Preceded by James Byrne	Member of the U.S. House of Representatives from Pennsylvania's 3rd congressional district 1973–1977	Succeeded by Raymond Lederer
Party political offices
Preceded by William Sesler	Democratic nominee for U.S. Senator from Pennsylvania (Class 1); 1976	Succeeded by Cyril Wecht
Political offices
Preceded by Frank Rizzo	Mayor of Philadelphia; 1980–1984	Succeeded by Wilson Goode
