= 1987 Philadelphia mayoral election =

- November 3, 1987
- Turnout: 71.12% (registered voters) ▲8 pp 38.76% (total population)
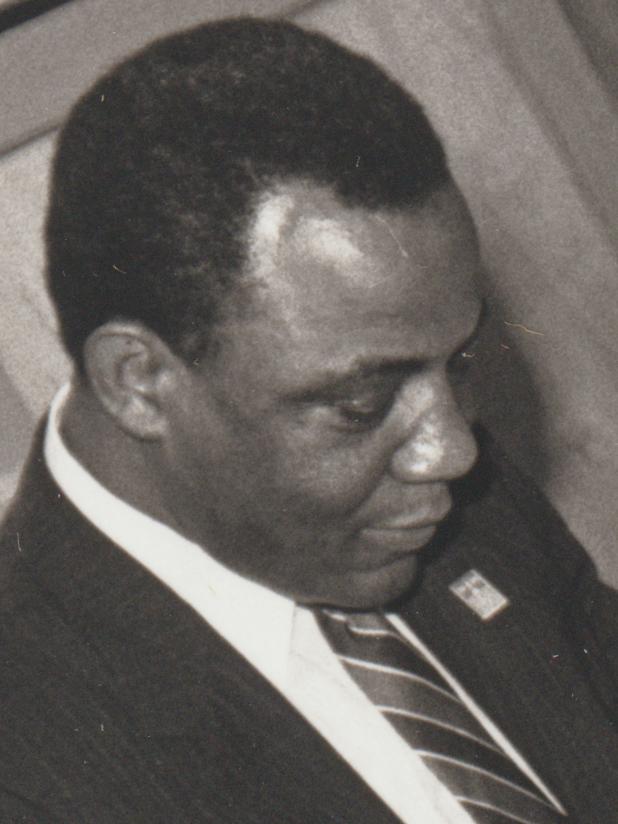

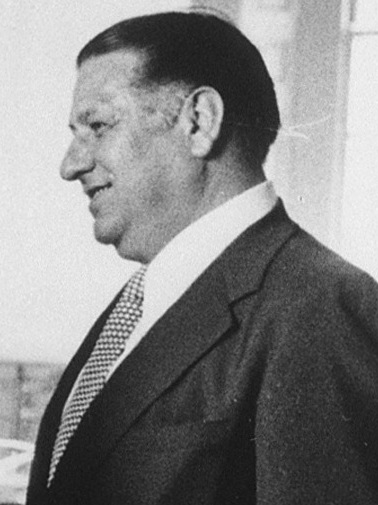
Nominee	Wilson Goode	Frank Rizzo
Party	Democratic	Republican
Popular vote	333,254	319,053
Percentage	51.09%	48.91%
- Results by ward Goode: 50–60% 70–80% 80–90% >90% Rizzo: 50–60% 60–70% 70–80% 80–90% >90%
Mayor before election
Wilson Goode
Democratic
Elected mayor
Wilson Goode
Democratic

The 1987 Philadelphia mayoral election saw the reelection of Wilson Goode over former mayor Frank Rizzo, who had switched to the Republican Party.

== Democratic primary ==
=== Candidates ===
==== Declared ====
- Wilson Goode, incumbent Mayor
- Ed Rendell, District Attorney of Philadelphia
- Bernard Salera, perennial candidate

=== Results ===
Results by ward Goode: 60%–70%; 70%–80%; 80%–90%; 90%–100%; Rendell: 50%–60%; 60%–70%; 70%–80%; 80%–90%; 90%–100%

Philadelphia mayoral Democratic primary, 1987
Party	Candidate	Votes	%
Democratic	Wilson Goode (incumbent)	230,200	56.96
Democratic	Ed Rendell	171,372	42.40
Democratic	Bernard Salera	2,590	0.64
Total votes		404,162	100.00

== Republican primary ==
=== Candidates ===
==== Declared ====
- John Egan, Republican nominee for mayor in 1983
- Frank Rizzo, former Mayor

=== Results ===
Results by ward Rizzo: 50%–60%; 60%–70%; 70%–80%; 80%–90%; Egan: 50%–60%; 60%–70%; 70%–80%

Philadelphia mayoral Republican primary, 1987
Party	Candidate	Votes	%
Republican	Frank Rizzo	74,120	58.16
Republican	John Egan	53,313	41.84
Total votes		127,433	100.00

== General election ==
=== Candidates ===
- Wilson Goode, incumbent mayor since 1984 (Democratic)
- Frank Rizzo, former mayor from 1972–80 (Republican)

=== Results ===
1987 Philadelphia mayoral election
Party	Candidate	Votes	%	±%
Democratic	Wilson Goode (incumbent)	333,254	51.09	▼4.17
Republican	Frank Rizzo	319,053	48.91	▲12.14
Total votes		652,307	100.00	
