= Wilson Goode =

American politician (born 1938)

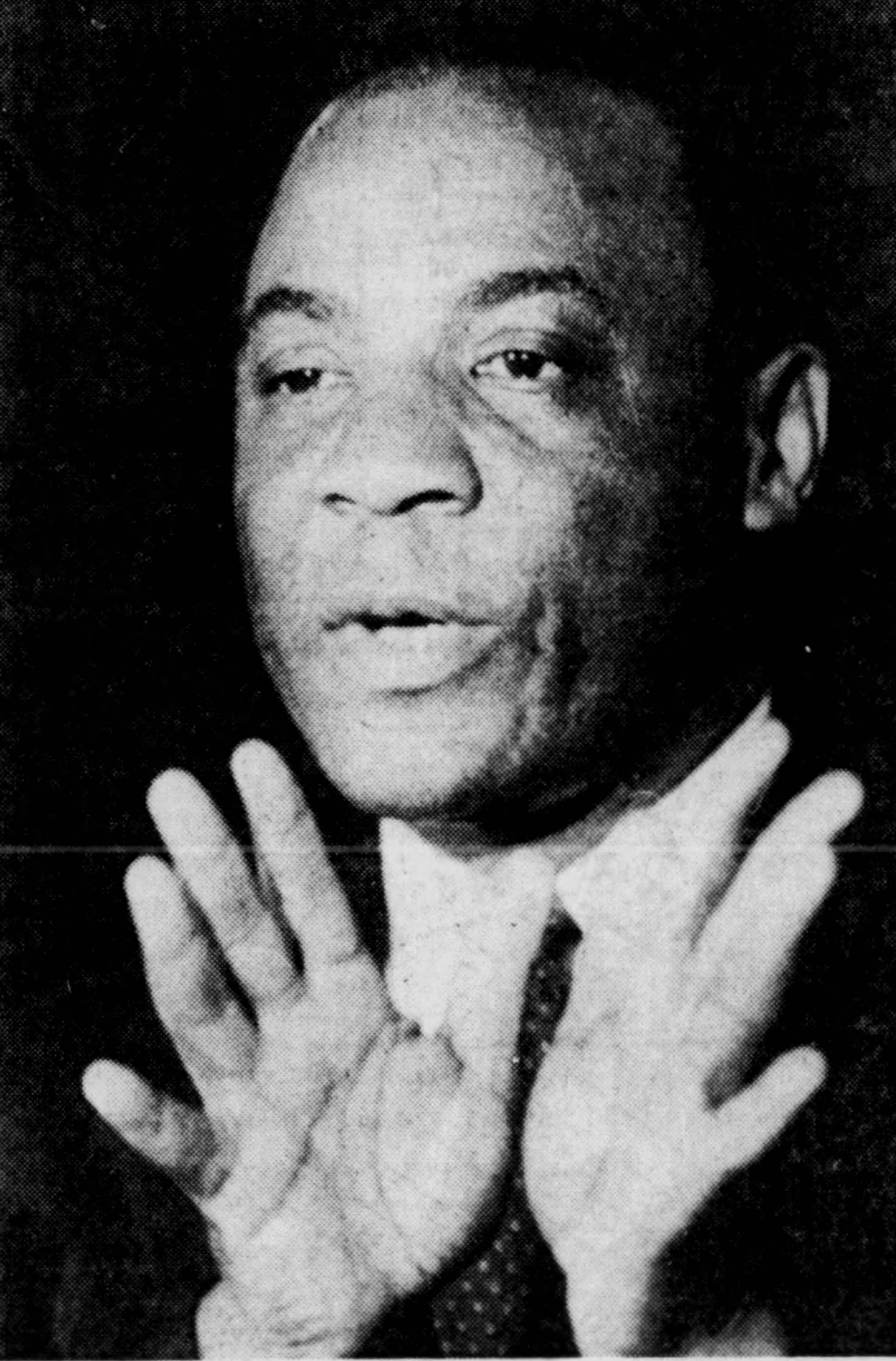
- Goode in 1985

95th Mayor of Philadelphia
- In office January 2, 1984 – January 6, 1992
- Preceded by: Bill Green
- Succeeded by: Ed Rendell

Personal details
- Born: Woodrow Wilson Goode Sr. August 19, 1938 (age 87) Seaboard, North Carolina, U.S.
- Party: Democratic
- Spouse: Velma Goode (m. 1960)
- Children: W. Wilson Goode Jr.
- Education: Morgan State University (BA); University of Pennsylvania (MPA); Eastern University (DMin)

Woodrow Wilson Goode Sr. (born August 19, 1938) is an American politician and former Mayor of Philadelphia and the first African American to hold that office. He served from 1984 to 1992, a period which included the controversial MOVE police action and house bombing in 1985. Goode was also a community activist, chair of the state Public Utility Commission, and managing director for the City of Philadelphia.

== Early life ==
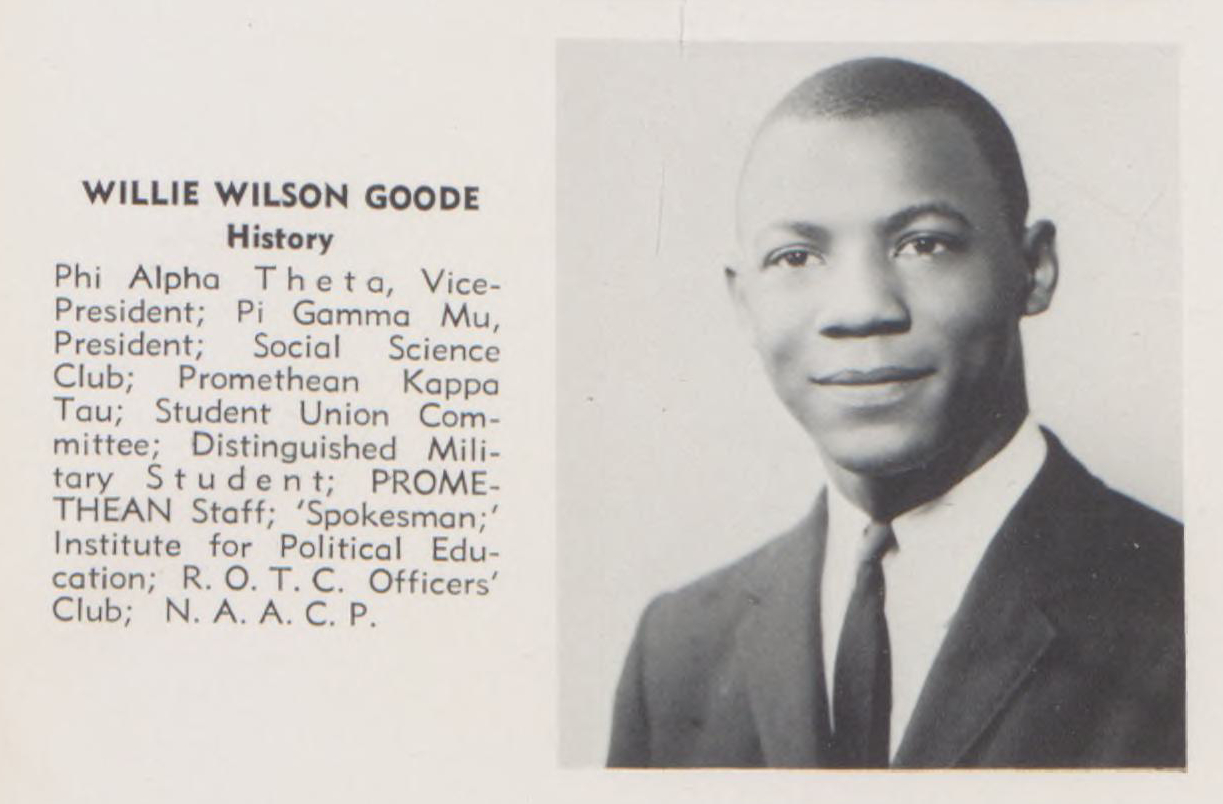
Goode in the Morgan State University yearbook, 1961

Goode was born into a family of tenant farmers near Seaboard, North Carolina. His family arrived in Philadelphia in 1953 and lived in the Paschall neighborhood in Southwest Philadelphia. He was an honors student at John Bartram High School and then he graduated from Morgan State University in 1961. He was a member of the Reserve Officers Training Corps while attending Morgan State and entered the US Army as a First Lieutenant in the military police. He returned to Philadelphia and briefly worked as a manager at a building maintenance firm and as an insurance adjuster before he was hired by the Philadelphia Council for Community Development in 1967. He became executive director of PCCD in 1971. In 1967 he and his wife bought a house in the Paschall neighborhood, where he served as a deacon of Paschall's First Baptist Church. In 1968, he completed his graduate studies at the Fels Institute of Government at the University of Pennsylvania where he earned his master's in Public Administration.

== Service with the Public Utility Commission ==
After African-American state senators complained that there had never been an African-American member of the state Public Utility Commission (PUC), Governor Milton Shapp began actively searching for one. His aide, Terry Dellmuth, knew Goode from his community and political activities and recommended him.

As a PUC commissioner, Goode met with community groups around the state, studied relevant issues, compiled what was seen as a pro-consumer record, and forged good working relations with his fellow commissioners. He was soon elevated to the chairmanship of the PUC, where he continued his pro-consumer policies but worked to limit PUC expenditures.

== Work in the Office of the Mayor ==
Philadelphia Mayor Bill Green, who had been elected in November 1979, had promised to appoint a black managing director after winning a racially divisive Democratic primary against former deputy mayor Charles Bowser. Green kept his promise by appointing Goode as managing director at the urging of key members of the black community.

== Mayor of Philadelphia ==
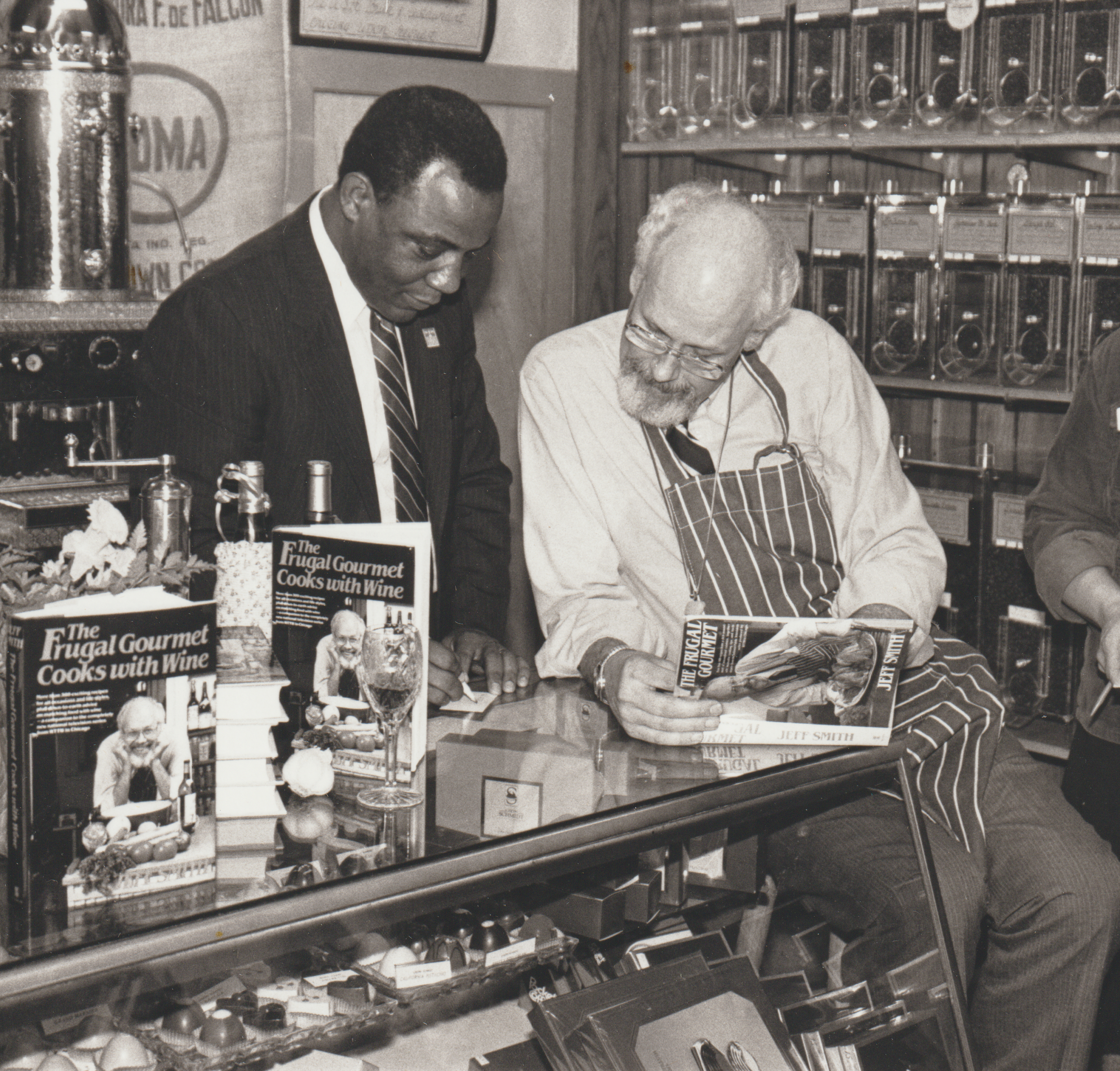
Goode with Jeff Smith, The Frugal Gourmet, at Fante's Kitchen Shop, 1986

Before the primary election of 1983, Green decided not to seek reelection. Goode jumped into the race and defeated former Mayor Frank Rizzo in a racially polarized primary election. Goode went on to win the general election over former Green fund-raiser and Philadelphia Stock Exchange Chairman John Egan, the Republican Party nominee.

Goode's tenure as mayor was marred in 1985 by the MOVE Bombing, in which police attempted to clear a building in West Philadelphia inhabited by MOVE, a radical back-to-nature group, whose members, under the leadership of founder John Africa, had long defied city officials by yelling slogans and statements from a megaphone, ignoring city sanitation codes, assaulting neighbors, and resisting law enforcement officers. During the attempt to evacuate the compound, police used tear gas, leading to members of MOVE opening fire on them. During the final assault on the building, the police dropped an improvised bomb made of C-4 plastic explosive and Tovex, an explosive gel used in underwater mining, onto to a bunker-like cubicle on the roof of the building. This caused the house to catch fire, and ignited a massive blaze which eventually consumed almost 4 city blocks, killed 11 people, and left 250 people homeless.

In 1987, Goode ran for reelection, winning the Democratic primary before facing off in the general election against former mayor Frank Rizzo, who had converted to the Republican Party after losing the 1983 Democratic primary to Goode. Goode defeated Rizzo 51%-49% to earn a second term.

== Post-mayoral life ==
Goode stayed active after leaving office as mayor by holding a position in the U.S. Department of Education. He earned a Doctor of Ministry at Palmer Theological Seminary, and became a minister and professor at Eastern University, as well as a leader of advocacy for faith-based initiatives. He is CEO of Amachi, a mentoring program for children of incarcerated parents. He was awarded the Purpose Prize, a $100,000 award given to exceptional individuals over age 60 who are working to address critical social problems.

== See also ==
- List of first African-American mayors

Political offices
Preceded by Bill Green	Mayor of Philadelphia; 1984–1992	Succeeded by Ed Rendell
