= 1992 United States Senate elections =

- November 3, 1992; November 24 (Georgia runoff); December 4 (North Dakota special)
- Class 3

36 (Note: 34 Class 3 seats, as well as 2 Class 1 seats in special election) of the 100 seats in the United States Senate 51 seats needed for a majority
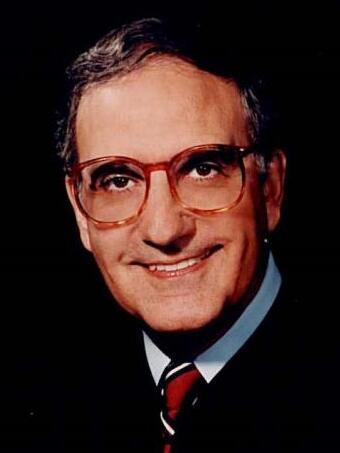

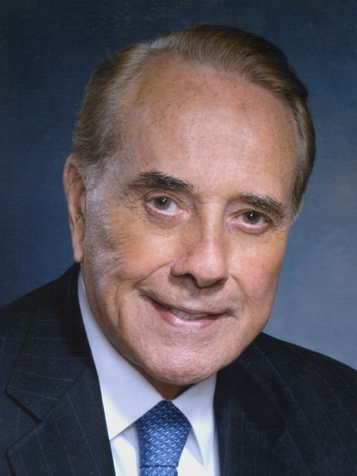
	Majority party	Minority party
Leader	George Mitchell	Bob Dole
Party	Democratic	Republican
Leader since	January 3, 1989	January 3, 1985
Leader's seat	Maine	Kansas
Seats before	57	43
Seats after	57	43
Seat change	Steady	Steady
Popular vote	40,589,727 (Note: Seat totals account for the special elections in both California and North Dakota, but nationwide vote totals exclude the North Dakota special election that was held in December, as the 1992 elections report prepared by the Clerk of the United States House of Representatives also excludes that latter election entirely. However, vote totals for the Georgia runoff are counted to the total.)	35,449,473
Percentage	49.9%	43.6%
Seats up	21	15
Races won	21	15
- Results of the elections: Democratic gain Democratic hold Republican gain Republican hold No election Rectangular inset (Calif. & N. D.): both seats up for election
Majority Leader before election
George Mitchell
Democratic
Elected Majority Leader
George Mitchell
Democratic

The 1992 United States Senate elections, held November 3, 1992, were elections for the United States Senate. The 34 seats of Class 3 were contested in regular elections, along with special elections to fill vacancies. They coincided with Bill Clinton's victory in the presidential election. This was the first time since 1956 that the balance of the Senate remained the same.

Both parties swapped a pair of seats, resulting in no net change in the partisan breakdown, which had been at 57–43 since Democrats flipped a seat in Pennsylvania in a special election. Democratic victories over Republicans John F. Seymour in the special California race and Bob Kasten in Wisconsin were canceled out by the defeats of Democrats Wyche Fowler in Georgia and Terry Sanford in North Carolina.

The election of 4 new Democratic women to the Senate was notable with it being referred to in the press as the "Year of the Woman". Due to a special election in California, both of California's Senate seats were up for election in 1992, and these seats were won by Dianne Feinstein and Barbara Boxer. Thus, California became the first state to have elected women to occupy both of its Senate seats. Democrat Carol Moseley Braun of Illinois, became the first African-American woman in the United States Senate. As of 2025, this was the last election cycle in which Republicans won a Senate election in New York and Democrats in Kentucky.

== Results summary ==
↓
57	43
Democratic	Republican

Seat totals include both the special elections in California and North Dakota, but vote totals exclude the North Dakota total.

Parties						Total
Parties	Democratic	Republican	Libertarian	Independent	Other	Total
Last elections (1990)	56	44	0	0	0	100
Before these elections	57	43	0	0	0	100
Not up	36	28	—	—	—	64
Up	21	15	—	—	—	36
Class 3 (1986→1992)	20	14	—	—	—	34
Special: Class 1	1	1	—	—	—	2
Incumbent retired	5 (Note: In North Dakota, interim appointee Jocelyn Burdick did not seek election to finish the term.)	3	—	—	—	8
Held by same party	5	3	—	—	—	8
Replaced by other party	0	0	—	—	—	0
Result	5	3	—	—	—	8
Incumbent ran	16 (Note: Alan J. Dixon lost renomination to represent Illinois. Carol Moseley Braun became the party's new nominee.)	12 (Note: Includes the interim appointee who ran for election.)	—	—	—	28
Won re-election	13	10	—	—	—	23
Lost re-election	▼2 Republicans replaced by ▲2 Democrats ▼2 Democrats replaced by ▲2 Republicans		—	—	—	4
Lost renomination, but held by same party	1	0	—	—	—	1
Result	16	12	—	—	—	28
Total elected	21	15	—	—	—	36
Net gain/loss	Steady	Steady	Steady	Steady	Steady	0
Nationwide vote	40,589,727	35,449,473 (Note: For the Georgia senate race, votes from the runoff election are counted.)	1,234,416	624,673	3,486,729	81,385,018
Share	49.87%	43.56%	1.52%	0.77%	4.28%	100%
Result	57	43	—	—	—	100

Source: Office of the Clerk of the U.S. House of Representatives

== Gains and losses ==
=== Retirements ===
Map of retirements: Republican incumbent Democratic incumbent Democratic incumbent retired or lost renomination Republican incumbent retired

Three Republicans and four Democrats retired instead of seeking re-election. One Democrat also retired instead of finishing the unexpired term.

State	Senator	Age at end of term	Assumed office	Replaced by
California (regular)	Alan Cranston	78	1969	Barbara Boxer
Colorado	Tim Wirth	53	1987	Ben Nighthorse Campbell
Idaho	Steve Symms	54	1981	Dirk Kempthorne
New Hampshire	Warren Rudman	62	1980	Judd Gregg
North Dakota (regular)	Kent Conrad	44 (Note: Conrad had planned to retire at the end of the 102nd Congress at this seat despite having not to run again in the 1992 election; however, he decided to run in the Class I seat at the 1992 special election to succeed appointee Jocelyn Burdick.)	1987	Byron Dorgan
North Dakota (special)	Jocelyn Burdick	70	1992 (Note: Appointed to the seat following the death of her husband, Quentin Burdick.)	Kent Conrad
Utah	Jake Garn	60	1974	Bob Bennett
Washington	Brock Adams	65	1987	Patty Murray

=== Defeats ===
One Republican and three Democrats sought re-election but lost either in the primary or general election. One Republican also sought election to finish the term but lost in the special election.

State	Senator	Assumed office	Replaced by
California (special)	John Seymour	1991 (Note: Appointed to the seat following the resignation of Pete Wilson.)	Dianne Feinstein
Georgia	Wyche Fowler	1987	Paul Coverdell
Illinois	Alan J. Dixon	1981	Carol Moseley Braun
North Carolina	Terry Sanford	1987	Lauch Faircloth
Wisconsin	Bob Kasten	1981	Russ Feingold

=== Post-election changes ===
Two Democrats resigned and were replaced by appointees. In Texas, a 1993 special election was held prior to the 1994 United States Senate elections, where Kay Bailey Hutchison won the special election to succeed Democratic appointee Bob Krueger, who lost election to finish the term.

State	Senator	Replaced by
Tennessee (Class 2)	Al Gore	Harlan Mathews
Texas (Class 1)	Lloyd Bentsen	Bob Krueger
Texas (Class 1)	Bob Krueger	Kay Bailey Hutchison

== Change in composition ==
=== Before the elections ===
D_{1}	D_{2}	D_{3}	D_{4}	D_{5}	D_{6}	D_{7}	D_{8}	D_{9}	D_{10}
D_{20}	D_{19}	D_{18}	D_{17}	D_{16}	D_{15}	D_{14}	D_{13}	D_{12}	D_{11}
D_{21}	D_{22}	D_{23}	D_{24}	D_{25}	D_{26}	D_{27}	D_{28}	D_{29}	D_{30}
D_{40} Colo. Retired	D_{39} Calif. (reg); Retired	D_{38} Ark. Ran	D_{37} Ala. Ran	D_{36}	D_{35}	D_{34}	D_{33}	D_{32}	D_{31}
D_{41} Conn. Ran	D_{42} Fla. Ran	D_{43} Ga. Ran	D_{44} Hawaii; Ran	D_{45} Ill. Ran	D_{46} Ky. Ran	D_{47} La. Ran	D_{48} Md. Ran	D_{49} Nev. Ran	D_{50} N.C. Ran
Majority →									D_{51} N.D. (reg); Retired
R_{41} Pa. Ran	R_{42} Utah; Retired	R_{43} Wisc. Ran	D_{57} Wash. Retired	D_{56} Vt. Ran	D_{55} S.D. Ran	D_{54} S.C. Ran	D_{53} Ohio; Ran	D_{52} N.D. (sp); Retired	D_{51} N.D. (reg); Retired
R_{31} Calif. (sp); Ran	R_{32} Idaho; Retired	R_{33} Ind. Ran	R_{34} Iowa; Ran	R_{35} Kan. Ran	R_{36} Mo. Ran	R_{37} N.H. Retired	R_{38} N.Y. Ran	R_{39} Okla. Ran	R_{40} Ore. Ran
R_{21}	R_{22}	R_{23}	R_{24}	R_{25}	R_{26}	R_{27}	R_{28}	R_{29} Ariz. Ran	R_{30} Alaska; Ran
R_{20}	R_{19}	R_{18}	R_{17}	R_{16}	R_{15}	R_{14}	R_{13}	R_{12}	R_{11}
R_{1}	R_{2}	R_{3}	R_{4}	R_{5}	R_{6}	R_{7}	R_{8}	R_{9}	R_{10}

=== Result of the elections ===
D_{1}	D_{2}	D_{3}	D_{4}	D_{5}	D_{6}	D_{7}	D_{8}	D_{9}	D_{10}
D_{20}	D_{19}	D_{18}	D_{17}	D_{16}	D_{15}	D_{14}	D_{13}	D_{12}	D_{11}
D_{21}	D_{22}	D_{23}	D_{24}	D_{25}	D_{26}	D_{27}	D_{28}	D_{29}	D_{30}
D_{40} Colo. Hold	D_{39} Calif. (reg); Hold	D_{38} Ark. Re-elected	D_{37} Ala. Re-elected	D_{36}	D_{35}	D_{34}	D_{33}	D_{32}	D_{31}
D_{41} Conn. Re-elected	D_{42} Fla. Re-elected	D_{43} Hawaii; Re-elected	D_{44} Ill. Hold	D_{45} Ky. Re-elected	D_{46} La. Re-elected	D_{47} Md. Re-elected	D_{48} Nev. Re-elected	D_{49} N.D. (reg); Hold	D_{50} N.D. (sp); Hold
Majority →									D_{51} Ohio; Re-elected
R_{41} Utah; Hold	R_{42} Ga. Gain	R_{43} N.C. Gain	D_{57} Wisc. Gain	D_{56} Calif. (sp); Gain (Note: Appointee defeated)	D_{55} Wash. Hold	D_{54} Vt. Re-elected	D_{53} S.D. Re-elected	D_{52} S.C. Re-elected	D_{51} Ohio; Re-elected
R_{40} Pa. Re-elected	R_{39} Ore. Re-elected	R_{38} Okla. Re-elected	R_{37} N.Y. Re-elected	R_{36} N.H. Hold	R_{35} Mo. Re-elected	R_{34} Kan. Re-elected	R_{33} Iowa; Re-elected	R_{32} Ind. Re-elected	R_{31} Idaho; Hold
R_{21}	R_{22}	R_{23}	R_{24}	R_{25}	R_{26}	R_{27}	R_{28}	R_{29} Alaska; Re-elected	R_{30} Ariz. Re-elected
R_{20}	R_{19}	R_{18}	R_{17}	R_{16}	R_{15}	R_{14}	R_{13}	R_{12}	R_{11}
R_{1}	R_{2}	R_{3}	R_{4}	R_{5}	R_{6}	R_{7}	R_{8}	R_{9}	R_{10}

=== Beginning of the first session ===
D_{1}	D_{2}	D_{3}	D_{4}	D_{5}	D_{6}	D_{7}	D_{8}	D_{9}	D_{10}
D_{20}	D_{19}	D_{18}	D_{17}	D_{16}	D_{15}	D_{14}	D_{13}	D_{12}	D_{11}
D_{21}	D_{22}	D_{23}	D_{24}	D_{25}	D_{26}	D_{27}	D_{28}	D_{29}	D_{30}
D_{40}	D_{39}	D_{38}	D_{37}	D_{36}	D_{35}	D_{34}	D_{33}	D_{32}	D_{31}
D_{41}	D_{42}	D_{43}	D_{44}	D_{45}	D_{46}	D_{47}	D_{48}	D_{49}	D_{50}
Majority →									D_{51}
R_{41}	R_{42}	R_{43}	R_{44} Texas; Gain	D_{56}	D_{55}	D_{54}	D_{53}	D_{52}	D_{51}
R_{40}	R_{39}	R_{38}	R_{37}	R_{36}	R_{35}	R_{34}	R_{33}	R_{32}	R_{31}
R_{21}	R_{22}	R_{23}	R_{24}	R_{25}	R_{26}	R_{27}	R_{28}	R_{29}	R_{30}
R_{20}	R_{19}	R_{18}	R_{17}	R_{16}	R_{15}	R_{14}	R_{13}	R_{12}	R_{11}
R_{1}	R_{2}	R_{3}	R_{4}	R_{5}	R_{6}	R_{7}	R_{8}	R_{9}	R_{10}

Key	D_{#} / Democratic; R_{#} / Republican

== Race summary ==
=== Special elections ===
In these special elections, the winners were elected and seated in the fall of 1992. Elections are sorted by election date then state and class.

State	Incumbent			Results	Candidates
State	Senator	Party	Electoral history	Results	Candidates
California (Class 1)	John Seymour	Republican	1991 (appointed)	Interim appointee lost election. New senator elected November 3, 1992 and seated November 4, 1992. Democratic gain.	▌ ✓ Dianne Feinstein (Democratic) 54.3%; ▌John Seymour (Republican) 38.0%; ▌Gerald Horne (Peace and Freedom) 2.8%; ▌Paul Meeuwenberg (American Independent) 2.6%; ▌Richard B. Boddie (Libertarian) 2.3%
North Dakota (Class 1)	Jocelyn Burdick	Democratic-NPL	1992 (appointed)	Interim appointee ineligible to run. New senator elected December 4, 1992 and seated December 14, 1992. Democratic-NPL hold.	▌ ✓ Kent Conrad (Democratic-NPL) 63.3%; ▌Jack Dalrymple (Republican) 33.7%; ▌Darold Larson (Independent) 3.0%

=== Elections leading to the next Congress ===
In these general elections, the winners were elected for the term beginning January 3, 1993; ordered by state.

All of the elections involved the Class 3 seats.

State	Incumbent			Results	Candidates
State	Senator	Party	Electoral history	Results	Candidates
Alabama	Richard Shelby	Democratic	1986	Incumbent re-elected.	▌ ✓ Richard Shelby (Democratic) 64.8%; ▌Richard Sellars (Republican) 33.1%; ▌Jerome Shockley (Libertarian) 2.0%
Alaska	Frank Murkowski	Republican	1980; 1986	Incumbent re-elected.	▌ ✓ Frank Murkowski (Republican) 53.0%; ▌Tony Smith (Democratic) 38.4%; ▌Mary Jordan (Green) 8.4%
Arizona	John McCain	Republican	1986	Incumbent re-elected.	▌ ✓ John McCain (Republican) 55.8%; ▌Claire Sargent (Democratic) 31.6%; ▌Evan Mecham (Independent) 10.5%; Others: ▌Kiana Delamare (Libertarian) 1.6%; ▌Ed Finkelstein (New Alliance) 0.5%
Arkansas	Dale Bumpers	Democratic	1974; 1980; 1986	Incumbent re-elected.	▌ ✓ Dale Bumpers (Democratic) 60.2%; ▌Mike Huckabee (Republican) 39.8%
California	Alan Cranston	Democratic	1968; 1974; 1980; 1986	Incumbent retired. Democratic hold.	▌ ✓ Barbara Boxer (Democratic) 47.9%; ▌Bruce Herschensohn (Republican) 43.0%; ▌Jerome McCready (American Independent) 3.5%; ▌Genevieve Torres (Peace and Freedom) 3.5%; ▌June R. Genis (Libertarian) 2.2%
Colorado	Tim Wirth	Democratic	1986	Incumbent retired. Democratic hold.	▌ ✓ Ben Nighthorse Campbell (Democratic) 51.8%; ▌Terry Considine (Republican) 42.7%; ▌Richard Grimes (Independent) 2.7%; Others: ▌Matt Noah (Christian Pro-Life) 1.5%; ▌Dan Winters (Independent) 1.3%
Connecticut	Chris Dodd	Democratic	1980; 1986	Incumbent re-elected.	▌ ✓ Chris Dodd (Democratic) 58.8%; ▌Brook Johnson (Republican) 38.1%; ▌Richard D. Gregory (Concerned Citizens) 2.4%; ▌Howard A. Grayson Jr. (Libertarian) 0.7%
Florida	Bob Graham	Democratic	1980; 1986	Incumbent re-elected.	▌ ✓ Bob Graham (Democratic) 65.4%; ▌Bill Grant (Republican) 34.6%
Georgia	Wyche Fowler	Democratic	1986	Incumbent lost re-election in runoff. Republican gain.	▌ ✓ Paul Coverdell (Republican) 50.6%; ▌Wyche Fowler (Democratic) 49.4%; ▌Jim Hudson (Libertarian) 3.1%
Hawaii	Daniel Inouye	Democratic	1962; 1968; 1974; 1980; 1986	Incumbent re-elected.	▌ ✓ Daniel Inouye (Democratic) 57.3%; ▌Rick Reed (Republican) 26.9%; ▌Linda Martin (Green) 13.7%; ▌Richard O. Rowland (Libertarian) 2.1%
Idaho	Steve Symms	Republican	1980; 1986	Incumbent retired. Republican hold.	▌ ✓ Dirk Kempthorne (Republican) 56.5%; ▌Richard H. Stallings (Democratic) 43.5%
Illinois	Alan J. Dixon	Democratic	1980; 1986	Incumbent lost renomination. Democratic hold.	▌ ✓ Carol Moseley Braun (Democratic) 53.3%; ▌Richard S. Williamson (Republican) 43.1%; Others: ▌Chad Koppie (Conservative) 2.0%; ▌Andrew B. Spiegel (Libertarian) 0.7%; ▌Charles A. Winter (Natural Law) 0.3%; ▌Alan J. Port (New Alliance) 0.3%; ▌Kathleen Kaku (Socialist Workers) 0.2%; ▌John Justice (Populist) 0.2%
Indiana	Dan Coats	Republican	1989 (appointed); 1990 (special)	Incumbent re-elected.	▌ ✓ Dan Coats (Republican) 57.3%; ▌Joe Hogsett (Democratic) 40.7%; Others: ▌Steve Dillon (Libertarian) 1.6%; ▌Raymond Tirado (New Alliance) 0.3%
Iowa	Chuck Grassley	Republican	1980; 1986	Incumbent re-elected.	▌ ✓ Chuck Grassley (Republican) 69.6%; ▌Jean Hall Lloyd-Jones (Democratic) 27.2%; Others: ▌Stuart Zimmerman (Natural Law) 1.3%; ▌Sue Atkinson (Independent) 0.5%; ▌Mel Boring (Independent) 0.4%; ▌Rosanne Freeburg (Independent) 0.4%; ▌Carl Eric Olsen (Grassroots) 0.3%; ▌Richard O'Dell Hughes (Independent) 0.2%; ▌Cleve Andrew Pulley (Socialist Workers) 0.1%
Kansas	Bob Dole	Republican	1968; 1974; 1980; 1986	Incumbent re-elected.	▌ ✓ Bob Dole (Republican) 62.7%; ▌Gloria O'Dell (Democratic) 31.0%; ▌Christina Campbell-Cline (Independent) 4.0%; ▌Mark B. Kirk (Libertarian) 2.2%
Kentucky	Wendell Ford	Democratic	1974; 1980; 1986	Incumbent re-elected.	▌ ✓ Wendell Ford (Democratic) 62.9%; ▌David L. Williams (Republican) 35.8%; ▌James Ridenour (Libertarian) 1.3%
Louisiana	John Breaux	Democratic	1986	Incumbent re-elected.	▌ ✓ John Breaux (Democratic) 73.07%; ▌Jon Khachaturian (Independent) 8.9%; ▌Lyle Stockstill (Republican) 8.3%; ▌Nick Accardo (Democratic) 5.4%; ▌Fred Clegg Strong (Republican) 4.3%
Maryland	Barbara Mikulski	Democratic	1986	Incumbent re-elected.	▌ ✓ Barbara Mikulski (Democratic) 71.0%; ▌Alan Keyes (Republican) 29.0%
Missouri	Kit Bond	Republican	1986	Incumbent re-elected.	▌ ✓ Kit Bond (Republican) 51.9%; ▌Geri Rothman-Serot (Democratic) 44.9%; ▌Jeanne Bojarski (Libertarian) 3.2%
Nevada	Harry Reid	Democratic	1986	Incumbent re-elected.	▌ ✓ Harry Reid (Democratic) 51.0%; ▌Demar Dahl (Republican) 40.2%; None of These Candidates 2.6%; Others: ▌Joe Garcia (Independent American) 2.3%; ▌Lois Avery (Natural Law) 1.5%; ▌H. Kent Cromwell (Libertarian) 1.5%; ▌Harry Tootle (Populist) 0.9%
New Hampshire	Warren Rudman	Republican	1980; 1986	Incumbent retired. Republican hold.	▌ ✓ Judd Gregg (Republican) 48.2%; ▌John Rauh (Democratic) 45.3%; ▌K. Alexander (Libertarian) 3.5%
New York	Al D'Amato	Republican	1980; 1986	Incumbent re-elected.	▌ ✓ Al D'Amato (Republican) 49.0%; ▌Robert Abrams (Democratic) 47.8%; ▌Norma Segal (Libertarian) 1.7%; Others: ▌M. T. Mehdi (New Alliance) 0.9%; ▌Stanley Nelson (Natural Law) 0.4%; ▌Ed Warren (Socialist Workers) 0.2%
North Carolina	Terry Sanford	Democratic	1986 (special); 1986	Incumbent lost re-election. Republican gain.	▌ ✓ Lauch Faircloth (Republican) 50.4%; ▌Terry Sanford (Democratic) 46.3%; ▌Bobby Emory (Libertarian) 3.3%
North Dakota	Kent Conrad	Democratic-NPL	1986	Incumbent retired. Democratic-NPL hold. Incumbent resigned December 14, 1992 to move to the other seat. Winner appointed December 15, 1992.	▌ ✓ Byron Dorgan (Democratic-NPL) 59.0%; ▌Steve Sydness (Republican) 38.9%; ▌Tom Asbridge (Independent) 2.1%
Ohio	John Glenn	Democratic	1974; 1974 (appointed); 1980; 1986	Incumbent re-elected.	▌ ✓ John Glenn (Democratic) 51.0%; ▌Mike DeWine (Republican) 42.3%; ▌Martha Grevatt (Independent) 6.7%
Oklahoma	Don Nickles	Republican	1980; 1986	Incumbent re-elected.	▌ ✓ Don Nickles (Republican) 58.5%; ▌Steve Lewis (Democratic) 38.2%; ▌Roy V. Edwards (Independent) 1.6%; ▌Thomas D. Ledgerwood II (Independent) 1.6%
Oregon	Bob Packwood	Republican	1968; 1974; 1980; 1986	Incumbent re-elected.	▌ ✓ Bob Packwood (Republican) 52.1%; ▌Les AuCoin (Democratic) 46.5%
Pennsylvania	Arlen Specter	Republican	1980; 1986	Incumbent re-elected.	▌ ✓ Arlen Specter (Republican) 49.1%; ▌Lynn Yeakel (Democratic) 46.3%; ▌John Perry III (Independent) 4.6%
South Carolina	Fritz Hollings	Democratic	1966 (special); 1968; 1974; 1980; 1986	Incumbent re-elected.	▌ ✓ Fritz Hollings (Democratic) 50.1%; ▌Thomas F. Hartnett (Republican) 46.9%; Others: ▌Mark Johnson (Libertarian) 1.9%; ▌Robert Barnwell Clarkson II (American) 1.0%
South Dakota	Tom Daschle	Democratic	1986	Incumbent re-elected.	▌ ✓ Tom Daschle (Democratic) 64.9%; ▌Charlene Haar (Republican) 32.5%; Others: ▌Gus Hercules (Libertarian) 1.3%; ▌Kent Hyde (Independent) 1.3%
Utah	Jake Garn	Republican	1974; 1980; 1986	Incumbent retired. Republican hold.	▌ ✓ Bob Bennett (Republican) 55.4%; ▌Wayne Owens (Democratic) 39.7%; ▌Anita Morrow (Independent) 2.3%
Vermont	Patrick Leahy	Democratic	1974; 1980; 1986	Incumbent re-elected.	▌ ✓ Patrick Leahy (Democratic) 54.2%; ▌Jim Douglas (Republican) 43.3%; Others: ▌Jerry Levy (Liberty Union) 1.8%; ▌Michael B. Godeck (LaRouche) 0.6%
Washington	Brock Adams	Democratic	1986	Incumbent retired. Democratic hold.	▌ ✓ Patty Murray (Democratic) 54.0%; ▌Rod Chandler (Republican) 46.0%
Wisconsin	Bob Kasten	Republican	1980; 1986	Incumbent lost re-election. Democratic gain.	▌ ✓ Russ Feingold (Democratic) 52.6%; ▌Bob Kasten (Republican) 46.0%; Others: ▌Patrick W. Johnson (Independent) 0.7%; ▌William Bittner (Libertarian) 0.4%; ▌Mervin A. Hanson Sr. (Independent) 0.1%; ▌Robert L. Kundert (Independent) 0.1%; ▌Joseph Selliken (Independent) 0.1%

== Closest races ==
In thirteen races, the margin of victory was under 10%.

State	Party of winner	Margin
New York	Republican	1.25%
Georgia	Republican (flip)	1.30%
Pennsylvania	Republican	2.77%
New Hampshire	Republican	2.82%
South Carolina	Democratic	3.12%
North Carolina	Republican (flip)	4.03%
California (regular)	Democratic	4.90%
Oregon	Republican	5.64%
Wisconsin	Democratic (flip)	6.56%
Missouri	Republican	6.96%
Washington	Democratic	7.98%
Ohio	Democratic	8.66%
Colorado	Democratic	9.07%

Illinois was the tipping point state, decided by a margin of 10%.

== Alabama ==
Alabama election
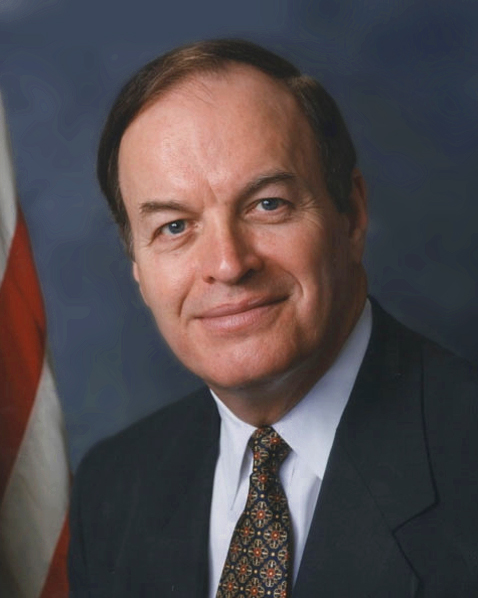

Nominee	Richard Shelby	Richard Sellers
Party	Democratic	Republican
Popular vote	1,022,698	522,015
Percentage	64.8%	33.1%
- County results Shelby: 50–60% 60–70% 70–80% 80–90% 90–100% Sellers: 50–60%
U.S. senator before election
Richard Shelby
Democratic
Elected U.S. Senator
Richard Shelby
Democratic

Incumbent Democrat Richard Shelby won re-election to a second term, beating Richard Sellers, a conservative activist.

1992 United States Senate election in Alabama
Party	Candidate	Votes	%
Democratic	Richard Shelby (incumbent)	1,022,698	64.8%
Republican	Richard Sellers	522,015	33.1%
Libertarian	Jerome Shockley	31,811	2.0%
Independent	Write Ins	1,275	0.1%
Majority		500,683	31.7%
Turnout		1,577,799	
Democratic hold			

== Alaska ==
Alaska election
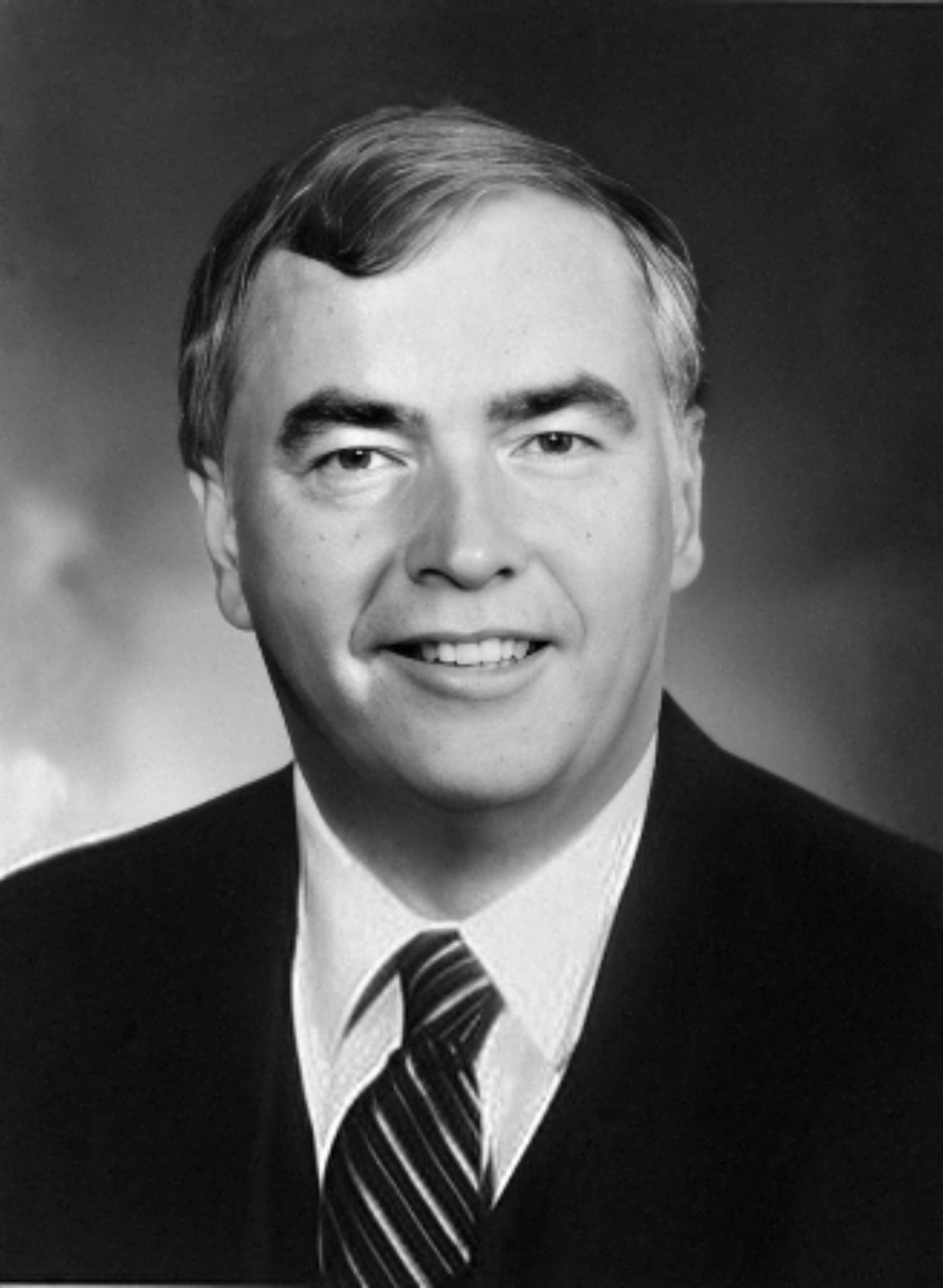

Nominee	Frank Murkowski	Tony Smith
Party	Republican	Democratic
Popular vote	127,163	92,065
Percentage	53.05%	38.41%
Nominee	Mary Jordan
Party	Green
Popular vote	20,019
Percentage	8.35%
- Results by state house district Murkowski: 40–50% 50–60% Smith: 40–50% 50–60%
U.S. senator before election
Frank Murkowski
Republican
Elected U.S. Senator
Frank Murkowski
Republican

Incumbent Republican Frank Murkowski sought re-election to a third term in the United States Senate. Tony Smith, the Democratic nominee and a former Commissioner of Economic Development, won his party's nomination in a crowded primary and faced off against Murkowski in the general election. Though Murkowski was held to a lower vote percentage than he received six years prior, he was ultimately re-elected.

Open primary
Party	Candidate	Votes	%
Democratic	Tony Smith	33,162	44.81%
Democratic	William L. Hensley	29,586	39.98%
Green	Mary Jordan	5,989	8.09%
Democratic	Michael Beasley	2,657	3.59%
Democratic	Joseph Sonneman	1,607	2.17%
Democratic	Frank Vondersaar	1,000	1.35%
Total votes		74,001	100.00%

Republican primary
Party	Candidate	Votes	%
Republican	Frank Murkowski (Incumbent)	37,486	80.53%
Republican	Jed Whittaker	9,065	19.47%
Total votes		46,551	100.00%

1992 United States Senate election in Alaska
Party	Candidate	Votes	%	±%
Republican	Frank Murkowski (Incumbent)	127,163	53.05%	−0.98%
Democratic	Tony Smith	92,065	38.41%	−5.69%
Green	Mary Jordan	20,019	8.35%	
Write-ins		467	0.19%	
Majority		35,098	14.64%	+4.72%
Turnout		239,714		
Republican hold		Swing		

== Arizona ==
Arizona election
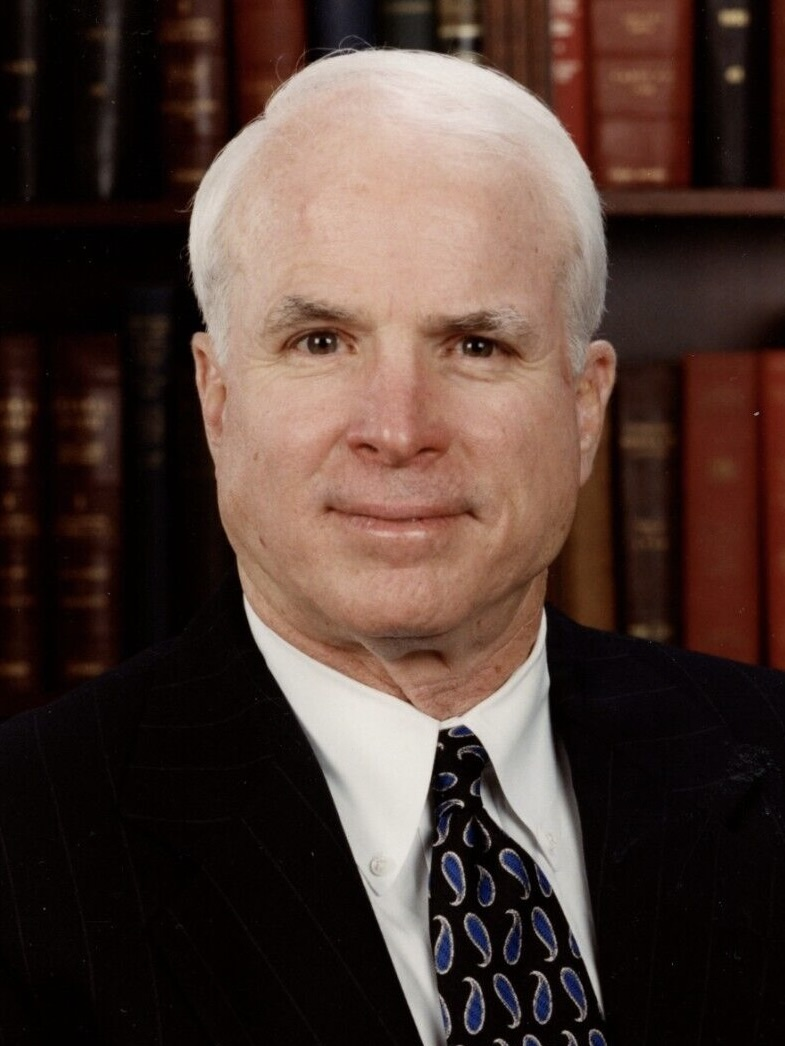

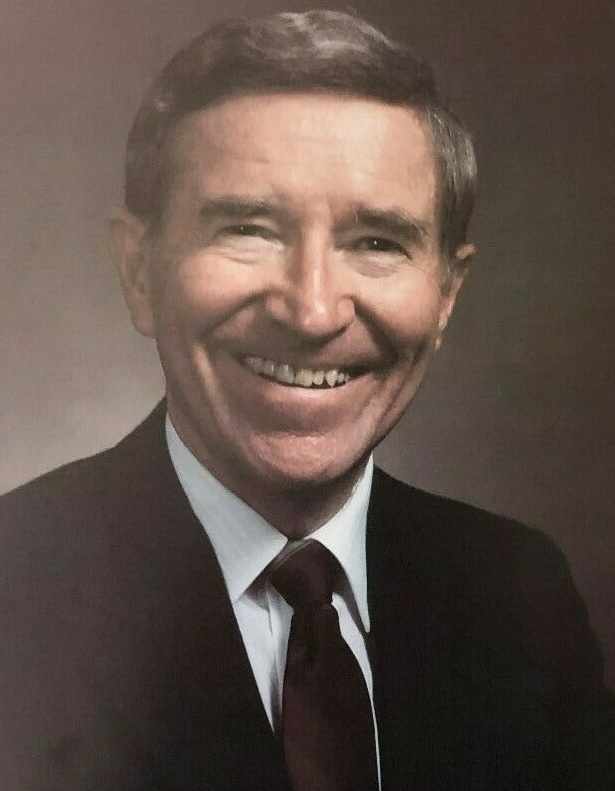
Nominee	John McCain	Claire Sargent
Party	Republican	Democratic
Popular vote	771,395	436,321
Percentage	55.8%	31.6%
Nominee	Evan Mecham
Party	Independent
Popular vote	145,361
Percentage	10.3%
- County results McCain: 40–50% 50–60% Sargent: 40–50%
U.S. senator before election
John McCain
Republican
Elected U.S. Senator
John McCain
Republican

Incumbent Republican John McCain won re-election to a second term over Democrat Claire Sargent, community activist and Independent former Governor Evan Mecham.

General election
Party	Candidate	Votes	%	±%
Republican	John McCain (Incumbent)	771,395	55.82%	−4.66%
Democratic	Claire Sargent	436,321	31.57%	−7.94%
Independent	Evan Mecham	145,361	10.52%	
Libertarian	Kiana Delamare	22,613	1.64%	
New Alliance	Ed Finkelstein	6,335	0.46%	
Write-ins		26	0.00%	
Majority		335,074	24.24%	+3.28%
Turnout		1,382,051		
Republican hold		Swing		

== Arkansas ==
Arkansas election
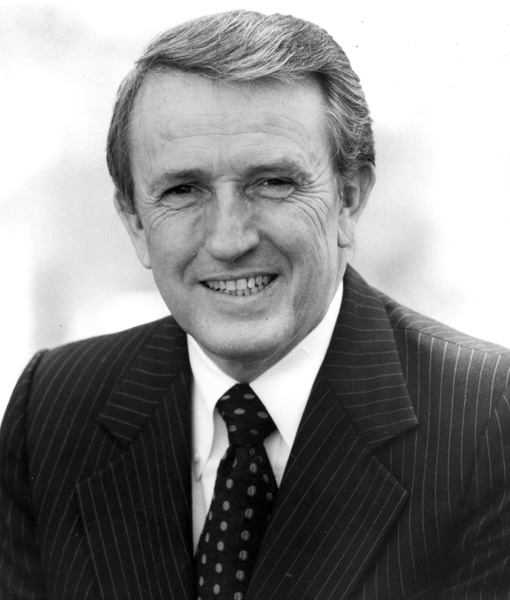

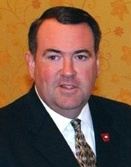
Nominee	Dale Bumpers	Mike Huckabee
Party	Democratic	Republican
Popular vote	553,635	366,373
Percentage	60.2%	39.8%
- County results Bumpers: 50–60% 60–70% 70–80% 80–90% Huckabee: 50–60%
U.S. senator before election
Dale Bumpers
Democratic
Elected U.S. Senator
Dale Bumpers
Democratic

Incumbent Democratic senator Dale Bumpers won re-election to a fourth term. His Republican opponent was future Arkansas lieutenant governor, governor, and two-time presidential candidate Mike Huckabee, a church pastor from Texarkana.

The 1992 election coincided with Arkansas governor Bill Clinton's election as President of the United States, in which he also won his home state. In contrast with Bumpers' landslide where he won over 60% of the vote, Clinton won only 53.21% of the vote. Bumpers would serve another term in the U.S. Senate before deciding to retire in 1998.

Arkansas Senate election 1992
Party	Candidate	Votes	%
Democratic	Dale Bumpers (Incumbent)	553,635	60.2%
Republican	Mike Huckabee	366,373	39.8%
Majority		187,262	20.4%
Turnout		920,008	
Democratic hold			

== California ==
Due to the resignation of Pete Wilson to become Governor of California, there were two senate elections in California as both seats were up for election and both won by women. California ultimately become the first state to have two sitting women senators.

=== California (regular) ===
California general election
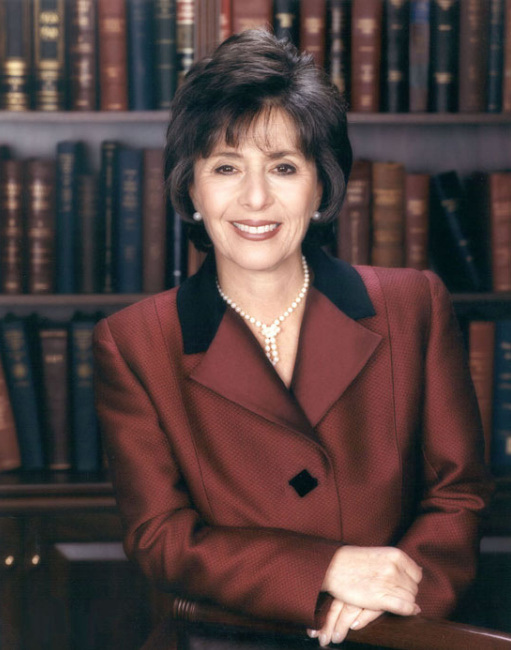

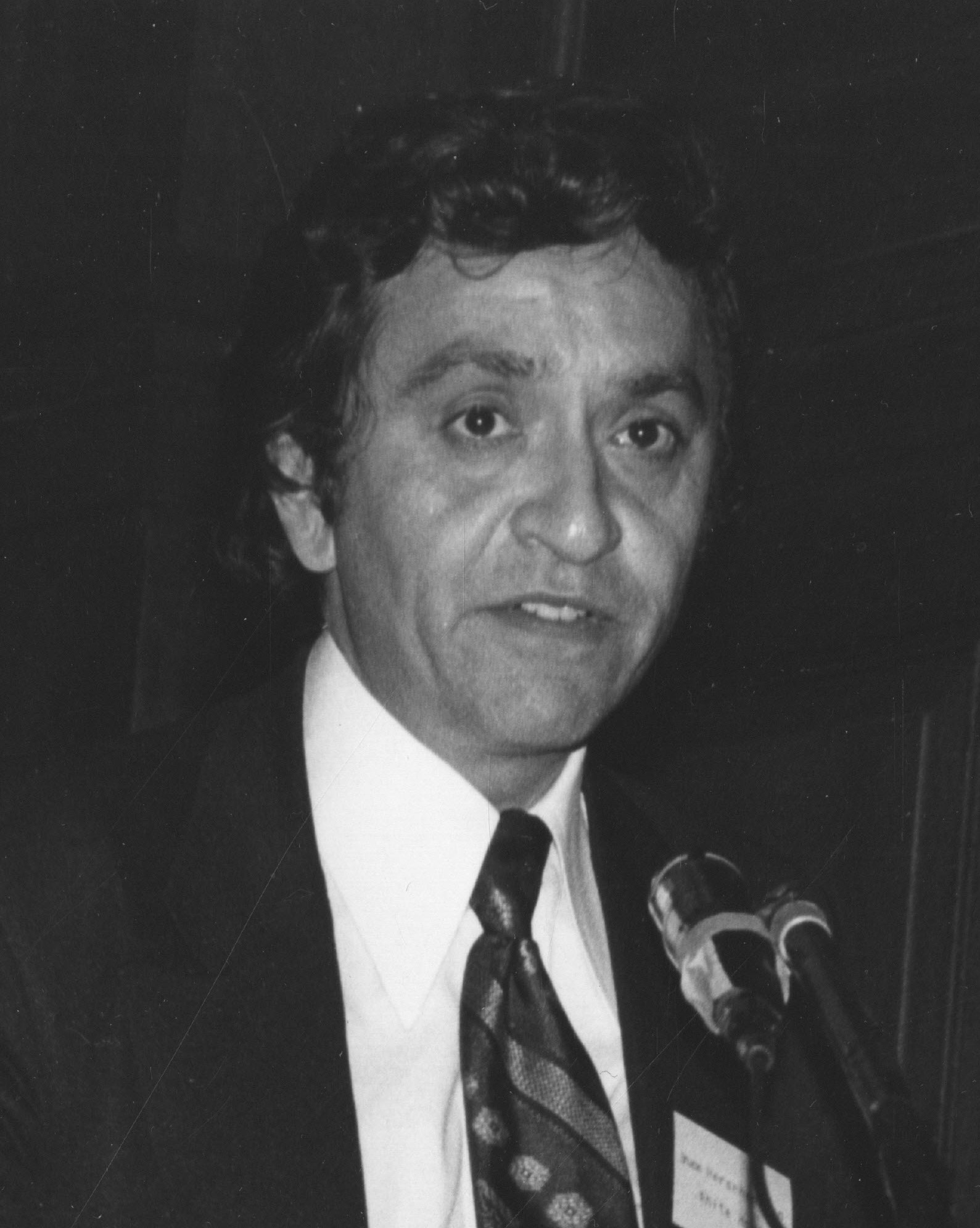
Nominee	Barbara Boxer	Bruce Herschensohn
Party	Democratic	Republican
Popular vote	5,173,467	4,644,182
Percentage	47.9%	43.0%
- County results Boxer: 40–50% 50–60% 60–70% Herchensohn: 40–50% 50–60% 60–70%
U.S. senator before election
Alan Cranston
Democratic
Elected U.S. Senator
Barbara Boxer
Democratic

Incumbent Democrat Alan Cranston decided to retire. Democratic U.S. Congresswoman Barbara Boxer won the open seat over Republican conservative TV talk show commentator Bruce Herschensohn. Both of California's senators were elected for the first time. This is not a unique occurrence; it would happen again in Tennessee in 1994, Kansas in 1996 and Georgia in 2020-2021. Fellow Democrat Dianne Feinstein, California's other senator, won the special election and was inaugurated in November 1992.

The election between Boxer and Herschensohn was very close. At the eleventh hour, controversy emerged that the Republican nominee attended a strip club, which some Republican operatives later blamed for Herschensohn's loss.

Four days before Election Day polls showed Herschensohn had narrowed a double digit deficit, trailing by 3 points. Political operative Bob Mulholland disrupted a campaign appearance with a large poster advertising a strip club shouting "Should the voters of California elect someone who frequently travels the strip joints of Hollywood?" Herschensohn admitted he had visited a strip club once, with his girlfriend and another couple. With press coverage of the story, Herschensohn spent the waning days of the campaign denying related allegations. When the votes were cast and counted, Barbara Boxer won the election by five points. Although Republicans have blamed the defeat on the underhanded tactics of the Boxer campaign, evidence of the connection between Mulholland's outburst and the campaign never surfaced.

The election was very close. Boxer was declared the winner by the Associated Press at 1:22 A.M. Pacific Coast Time.

1992 United States Senate election, California
Party	Candidate	Votes	%
Democratic	Barbara Boxer	5,173,467	47.90
Republican	Bruce Herschensohn	4,644,182	43.00
American Independent	Jerome N. McCready	373,051	3.45
Peace and Freedom	Genevieve Torres	372,817	3.45
Libertarian	June R. Genis	235,919	2.18
No party	Write-ins	267	0.00
Invalid or blank votes		574,862	5.05
Total votes		11,374,565	100.00
Turnout			54.52
Democratic hold			

=== California (special) ===
California special election
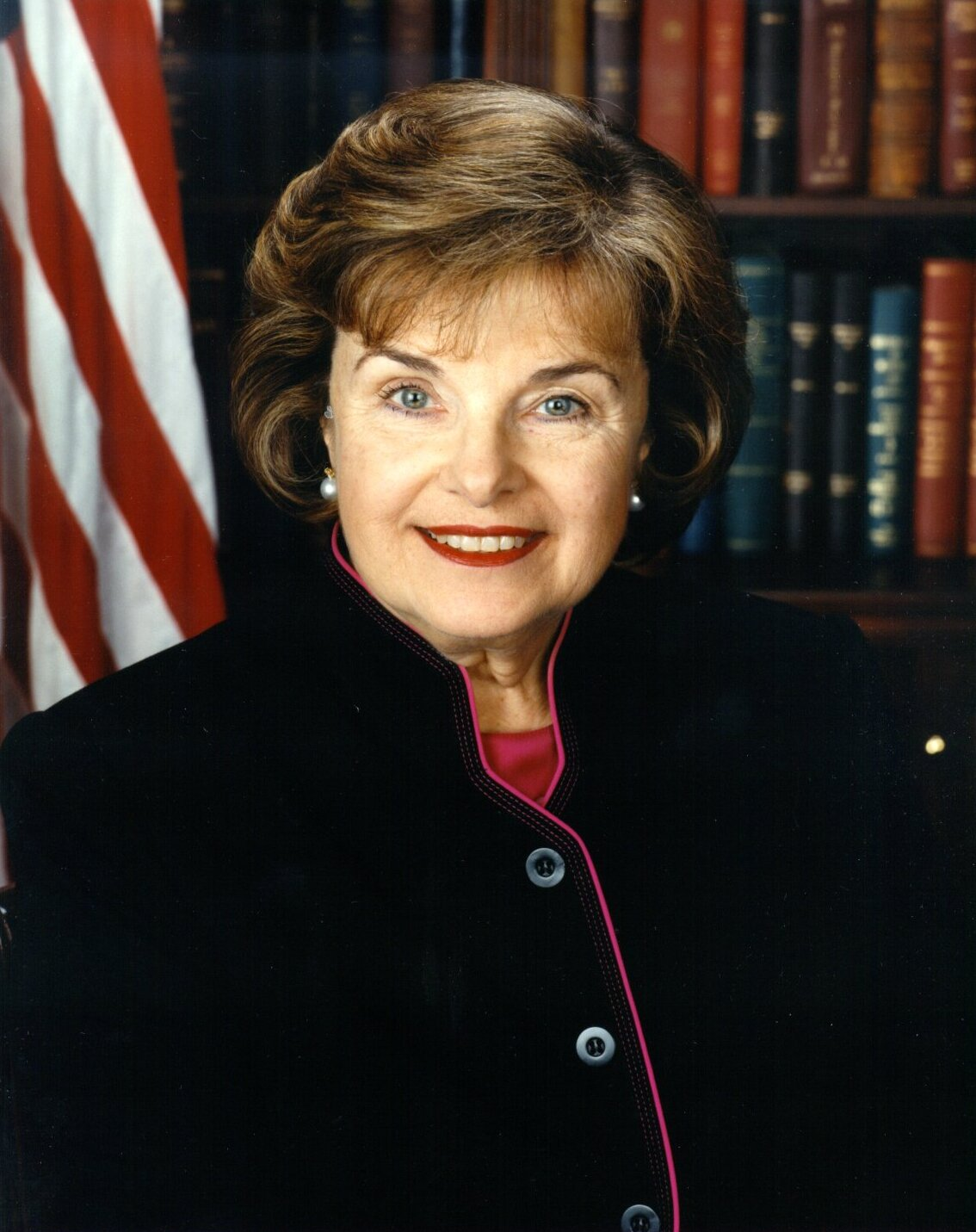

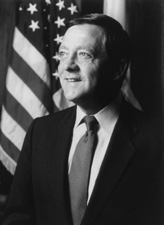
Nominee	Dianne Feinstein	John F. Seymour
Party	Democratic	Republican
Popular vote	5,853,651	4,093,501
Percentage	54.29%	37.96%
- County results Feinstein: 40–50% 50–60% 60–70% 70–80% Seymour: 40–50% 50–60%
U.S. senator before election
John F. Seymour
Republican
Elected U.S. Senator
Dianne Feinstein
Democratic

In the 1990 gubernatorial election, Republican senator Pete Wilson had beaten Democrat Dianne Feinstein for governor. He appointed John F. Seymour to the Senate to replace himself. In this special election held simultaneously with the regular Senate election, Feinstein defeated Seymour to serve the remaining 2 years of the term and took office November 4, only 1 day after the election. Fellow Democrat Barbara Boxer won the regular election and was sworn in in January 1993.

Both of California's senators were simultaneously elected for the first time. This is not a unique occurrence; it would happen again in Tennessee in 1994, Kansas in 1996, and Georgia in 2020.

1992 special United States Senate election, California
Party	Candidate	Votes	%
Democratic	Dianne Feinstein	5,853,651	54.29%
Republican	John F. Seymour (Incumbent)	4,093,501	37.96%
Peace and Freedom	Gerald Horne	305,697	2.84%
American Independent	Paul Meeuwenberg	281,973	2.62%
Libertarian	Richard Benjamin Boddie	247,799	2.30%
No party	Write-ins	122	0.00%
Invalid or blank votes		591,822	5.20%
Total votes		11,374,565	100.00%
Turnout			54.52
Democratic gain from Republican			

== Colorado ==
Colorado election
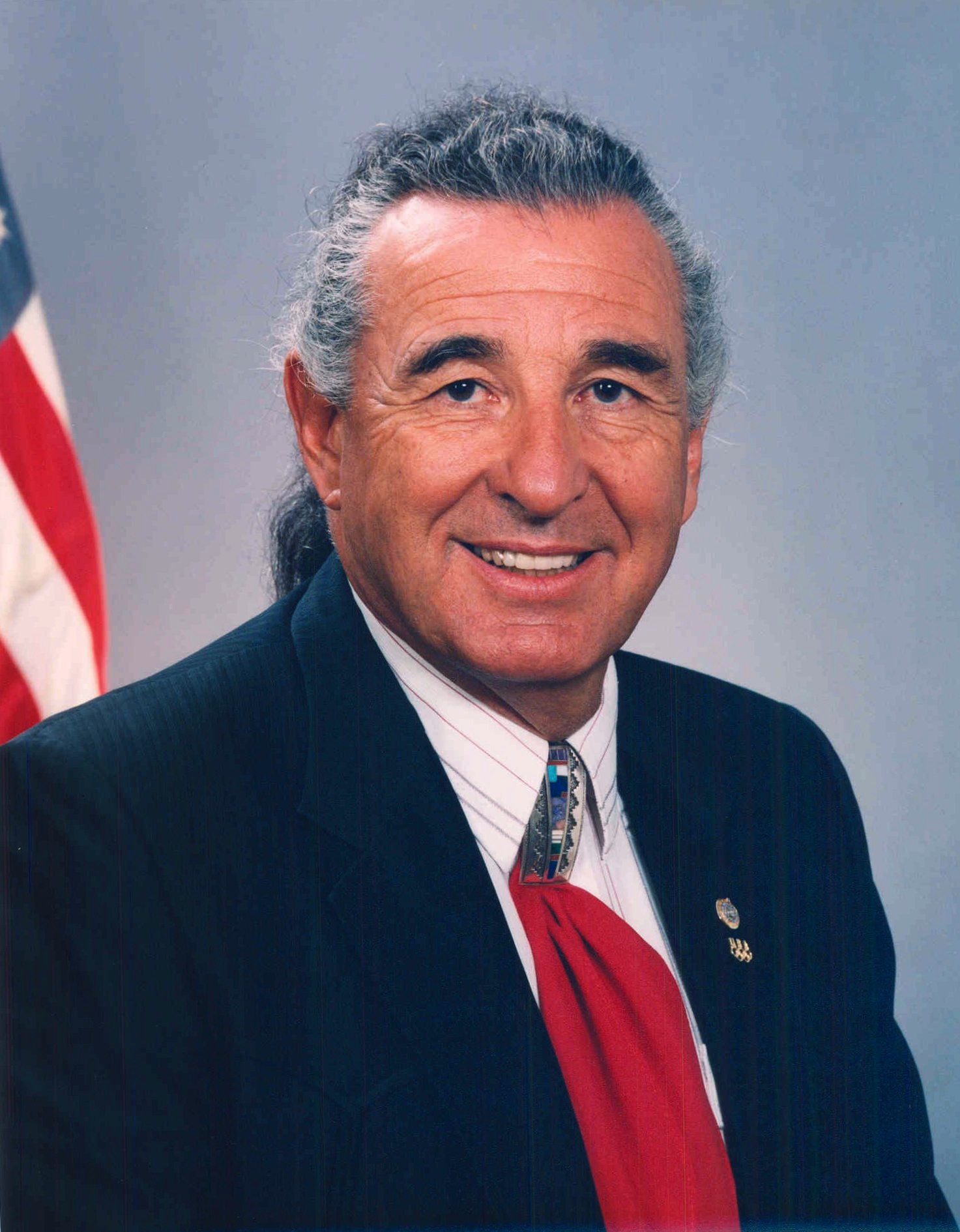

Nominee	Ben Nighthorse Campbell	Terry Considine
Party	Democratic	Republican
Popular vote	803,725	662,893
Percentage	51.8%	42.7%
- County results Nighthorse Campbell: 40–50% 50–60% 60–70% 70–80% Considine: 40–50% 50–60% 60–70%
U.S. senator before election
Tim Wirth
Democratic
Elected U.S. Senator
Ben Nighthorse Campbell
Democratic

Incumbent Democrat Tim Wirth decided to retire instead of seeking a second term. Democratic congressman Ben Nighthorse Campbell won the open seat, beating Republican State senator Terry Considine.

Democratic primary election
Party	Candidate	Votes	%
Democratic	Ben Nighthorse Campbell	117,634	45.48%
Democratic	Dick Lamm	93,599	36.19%
Democratic	Josie Heath	47,418	18.33%
Total votes		258,651	100.00%

General election
Party	Candidate	Votes	%	±%
Democratic	Ben Nighthorse Campbell	803,725	51.78%	+1.86%
Republican	Terry Considine	662,893	42.70%	−5.66%
Independent	Richard O. Grimes	42,455	2.73%	
Pro-Life	Matt Noah	22,846	1.47%	
Independent	Dan Winters	20,347	1.31%	
Libertarian	Hue Futch	23	0.00%	
Majority		140,832	9.07%	+7.52%
Turnout		1,552,289		
Democratic hold		Swing		

== Connecticut ==
Connecticut election
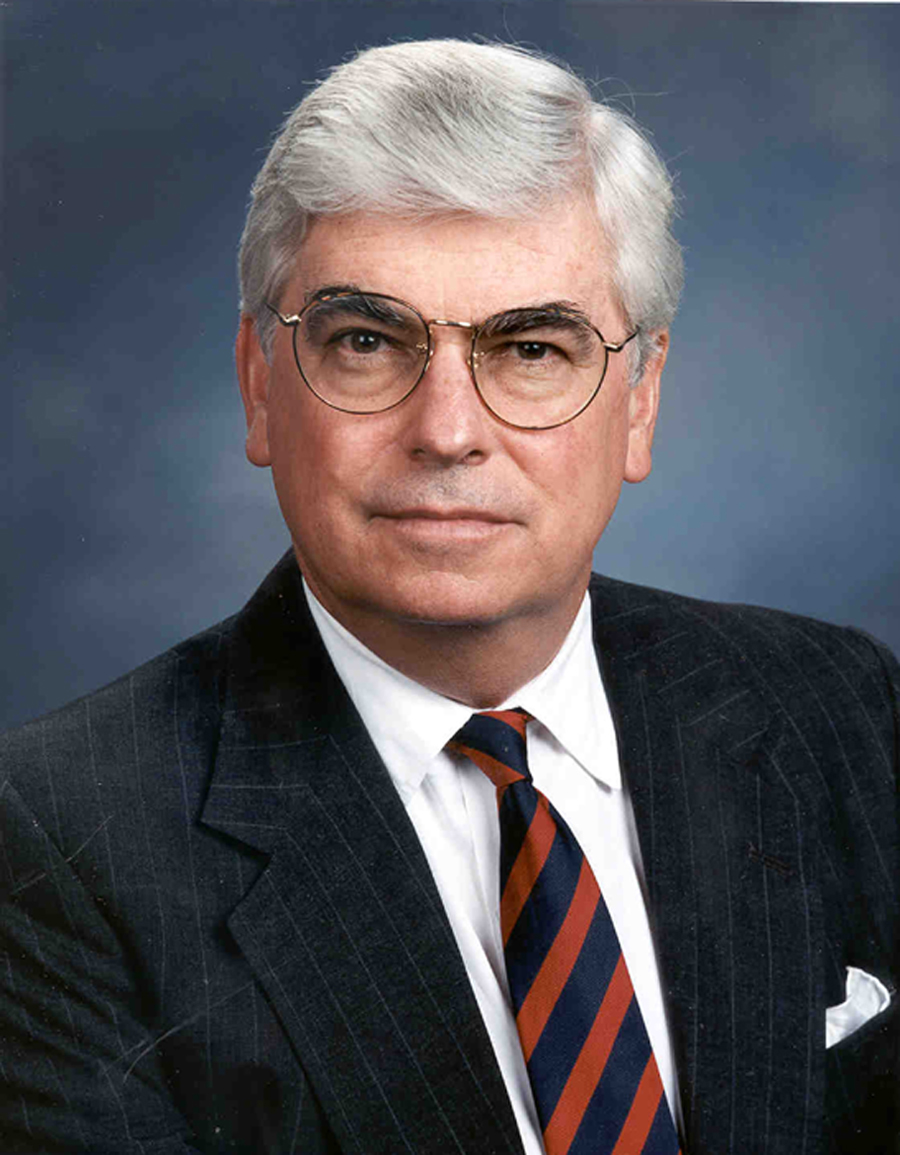

Nominee	Chris Dodd	Brook Johnson
Party	Democratic	Republican
Popular vote	882,569	572,036
Percentage	58.8%	38.1%
- Dodd: 40–50% 50–60% 60–70% 70–80% 80–90% Johnson: 40–50% 50–60% 60–70%
U.S. senator before election
Chris Dodd
Democratic
Elected U.S. Senator
Chris Dodd
Democratic

Incumbent Democrat Christopher Dodd won re-election for a third term over Republican businessman Brook Johnson.

Johnson, a millionaire businessman who had never run for public office before, spent about $900,000 during the primary campaign. His television and radio commercials said that he would bring "a dose of success Washington needs." Dodd had $2 million cash on hand following the primaries.

1988 Connecticut United States Senate election
Party	Candidate	Votes	%
Democratic	Christopher Dodd (Incumbent)	882,569	58.81%
Republican	Brook Johnson	572,036	38.12%
Concerned Citizens	Richard D. Gregory	35,315	2.35%
Libertarian	Howard A. Grayson Jr.	10,741	0.72%
Total votes		1,500,661	100.00%
Democratic hold			

== Florida ==
Florida election
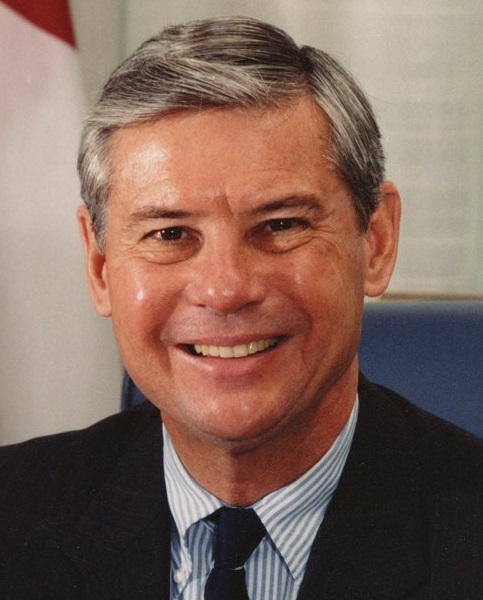

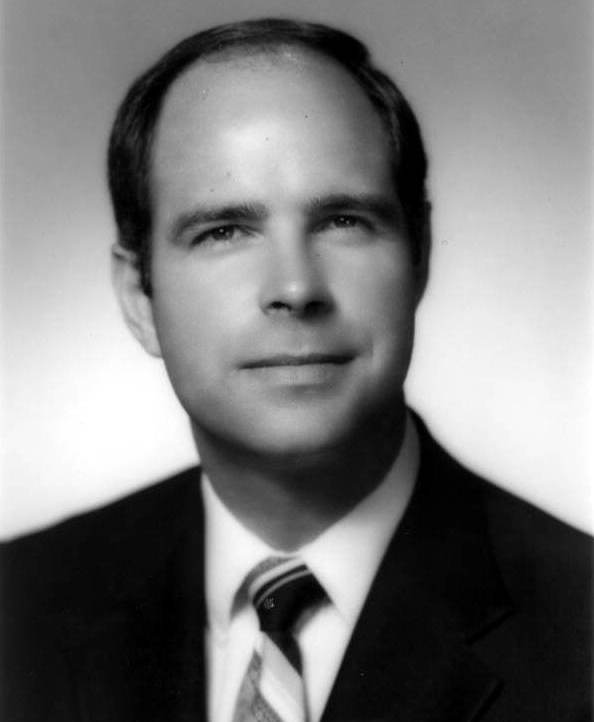
Nominee	Bob Graham	Bill Grant
Party	Democratic	Republican
Popular vote	3,245,585	1,716,511
Percentage	65.4%	35.4%
- Graham: 50–60% 60–70% 70–80% 80–90% Grant: 50–60%
U.S. senator before election
Bob Graham
Democratic
Elected U.S. Senator
Bob Graham
Democratic

Incumbent Democrat Bob Graham won re-election to a second term, beating Republican former U.S. Representative Bill Grant.

Democratic primary election
Party	Candidate	Votes	%
Democratic	Bob Graham (Incumbent)	968,618	84.3%
Democratic	Jim Mahorner	180,405	15.7%
Total votes		1,149,023	100.0%

Republican primary election
Party	Candidate	Votes	%
Republican	Bill Grant	413,457	56.1%
Republican	Rob Quartel	196,524	26.7%
Republican	Hugh Brotherton	126,878	17.2%
Total votes		736,859	100.0%

Graham defeated Grant in a landslide, as Grant won just one county in the state (Okaloosa County, Florida). There were no third party or independent candidates.

General election
Party	Candidate	Votes	%	±%
Democratic	Bob Graham (incumbent)	3,245,565	65.40%	+10.66%
Republican	Bill Grant	1,716,505	34.59%	−10.67%
Write-ins	Marie Davis	220	0.01%	
Majority		1,529,060	30.81%	
Total votes		4,962,290	100.00%	
Democratic hold		Swing		

== Georgia ==
1992 United States Senate election in Georgia
- November 3, 1992 (first round); November 24, 1992 (runoff)
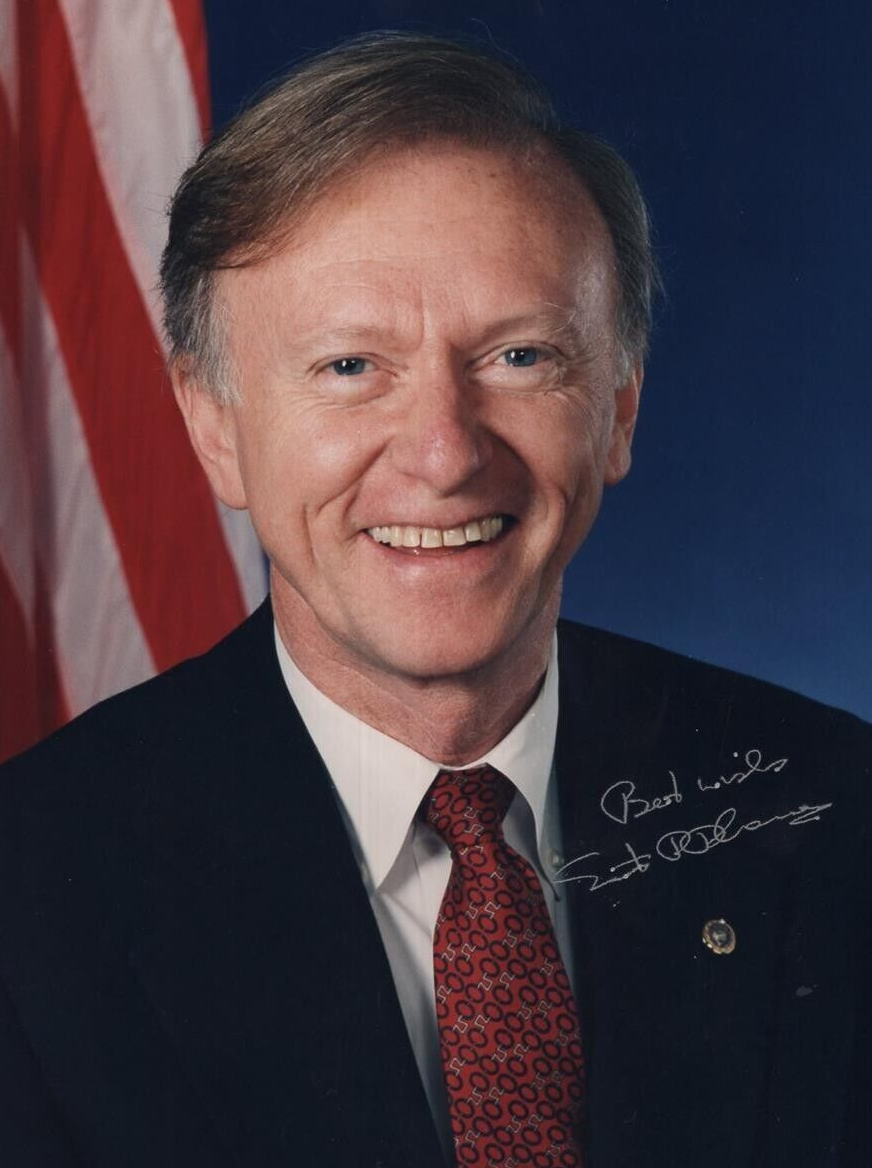

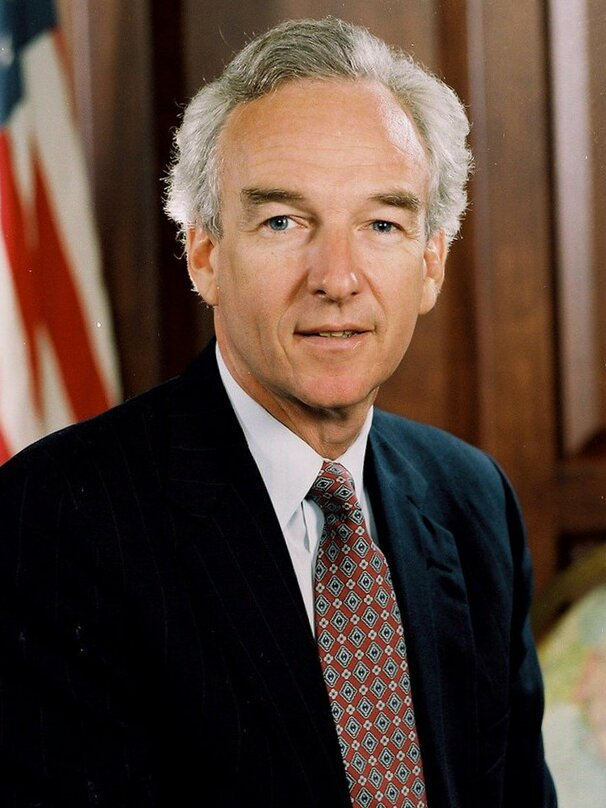
Nominee	Paul Coverdell	Wyche Fowler
Party	Republican	Democratic
First round	1,073,282; 47.67%	1,108,416; 49.23%
Runoff	635,118; 50.65%	618,774; 49.35%
- Coverdell: 40–50% 50–60% 60–70% 70–80% Fowler: 40–50% 50–60% 60–70% 70–80% 80–90%
U.S. senator before election
Wyche Fowler
Democratic
Elected U.S. Senator
Paul Coverdell
Republican

Incumbent Democrat Wyche Fowler did not receive a simple majority in the general election, which demanded a runoff. Paul Coverdell, former Director of the Peace Corps and former State senator, edged out Fowler in the runoff with a narrow margin.

The general primary was held July 21, 1992. A run-off between the top two Republican contenders was held on August 11, in which Paul Coverdell defeated Bob Barr.

Results for the first round showed that since Paul Coverdell did not win a majority of the vote, a runoff was held between him and Barr. Coverdell subsequently won the runoff.

1992 Georgia U.S. Senate Republican primary election
Party	Candidate	Votes	%
Republican	Paul Coverdell	100,016	37.05%
Republican	Bob Barr	65,471	24.25%
Republican	John Knox	64,514	23.90%
Republican	Charlie Tanksley	32,590	12.07%
Republican	Dean Parkison	7,352	2.72%
Turnout		269,943	100.00%

1992 Georgia U.S. Senate Republican primary election runoff
Party	Candidate	Votes	%
Republican	Paul Coverdell	80,435	50.49%
Republican	Bob Barr	78,887	49.51%
Turnout		159,332	100.00%

1992 Georgia United States Senate election
Party	Candidate	Votes	%
Democratic	Wyche Fowler (Incumbent)	1,108,416	49.23%
Republican	Paul Coverdell	1,073,282	47.67%
Libertarian	Jim Hudson	69,878	3.10%
	Write-In Votes	11	0.00%
Majority		35,134	1.56%
Turnout		2,251,587	

As no candidate reached a majority on November 3, a runoff election was held on November 24, which Coverdell won.

Georgia United States Senate election runoff, 1992
Party	Candidate	Votes	%
Republican	Paul Coverdell	635,118	50.65%
Democratic	Wyche Fowler (Incumbent)	618,774	49.35%
Majority		16,344	1.30%
Turnout		1,253,892	
Republican gain from Democratic			

== Hawaii ==
Hawaii election
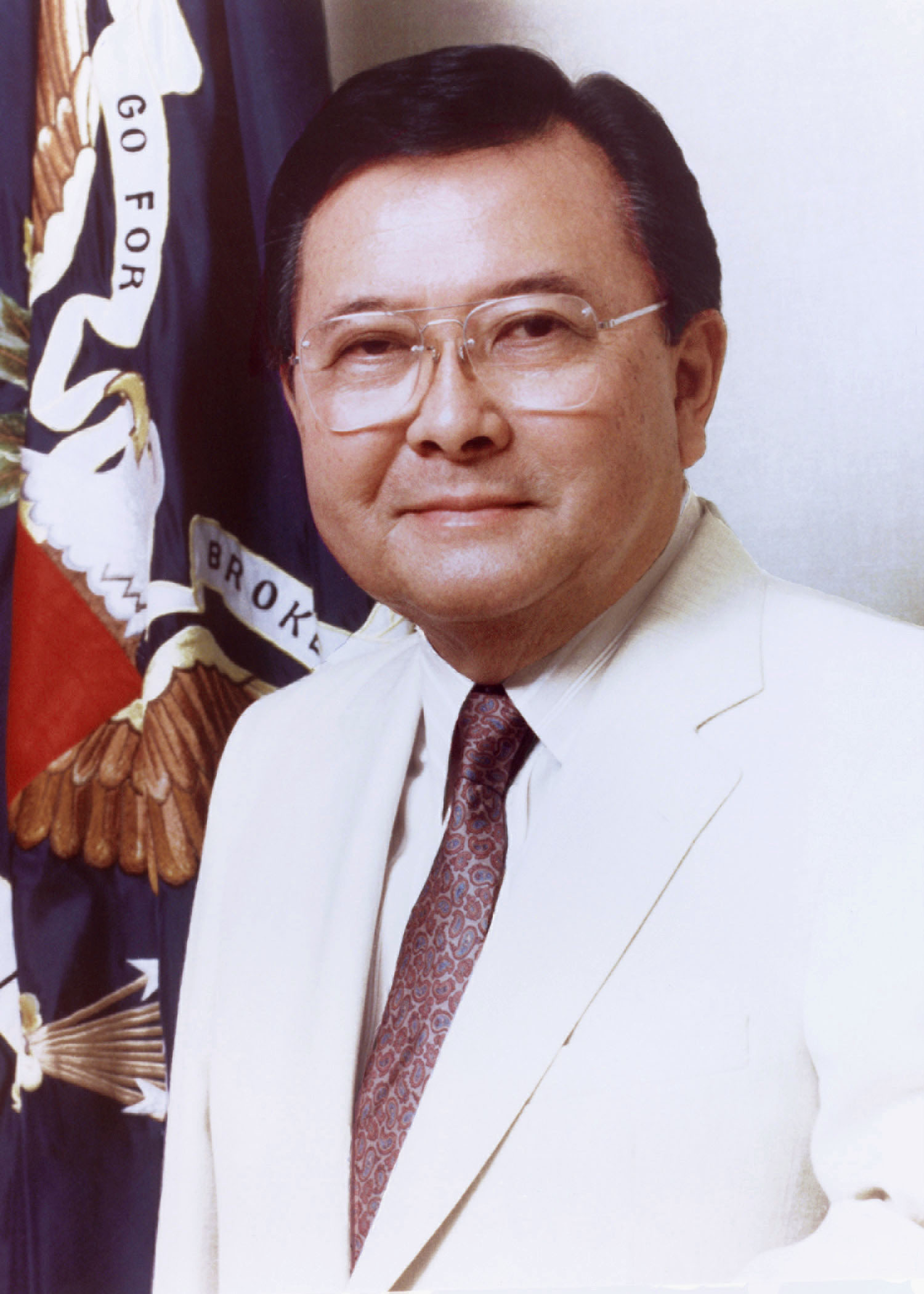

Nominee	Daniel Inouye	Rick Reed
Party	Democratic	Republican
Popular vote	208,266	97,928
Percentage	57.3%	26.9%
Nominee	Linda Martin
Party	Green
Popular vote	49,921
Percentage	13.7%
- County results Inouye: 50–60% 60–70%
U.S. senator before election
Daniel Inouye
Democratic
Elected U.S. Senator
Daniel Inouye
Democratic

Incumbent Democrat Daniel Inouye won re-election to a sixth term over Republican State senator Rick Reed.

Hawaii general election
Party	Candidate	Votes	%
Democratic	Daniel Inouye (Incumbent)	208,266	57.3%
Republican	Rick Reed	97,928	26.9%
Green	Linda Martin	49,921	13.7%
Libertarian	Richard O. Rowland	7,547	2.1%
Total votes		363,662	100.0%
Majority		110,338	30.4%
Democratic hold			

== Idaho ==
Idaho election
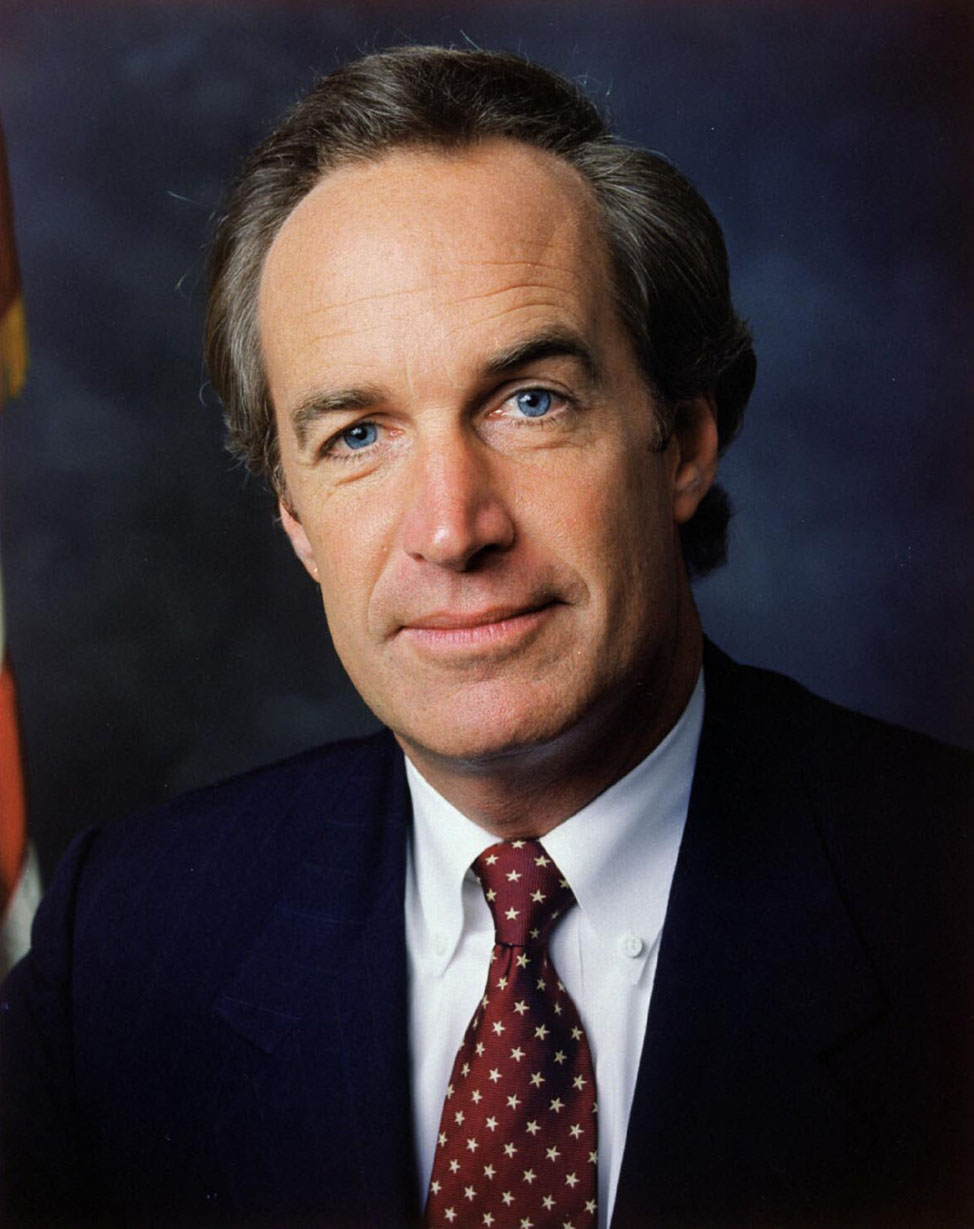

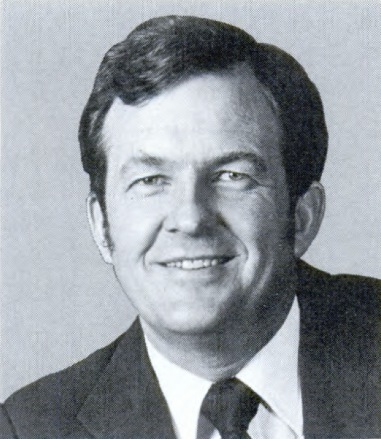
Nominee	Dirk Kempthorne	Richard H. Stallings
Party	Republican	Democratic
Popular vote	270,468	208,036
Percentage	56.5%	43.5%
- County results Kempthorne: 50–60% 60–70% Stallings: 50–60% 60–70%
U.S. senator before election
Steve Symms
Republican
Elected U.S. Senator
Dirk Kempthorne
Republican

Incumbent Republican Steve Symms decided to retire instead of seeking a third term. Republican Mayor of Boise Dirk Kempthorne won the open seat, beating Democratic congressman Richard H. Stallings.

Democratic primary
Party	Candidate	Votes	%
Democratic	Richard H. Stallings	40,102	71.66
Democratic	Matt Schaffer	8,976	16.04
Democratic	David W. Sheperd	6,882	12.30
Total votes		55,960	100.00

Republican primary
Party	Candidate	Votes	%
Republican	Dirk Kempthorne	67,001	57.43
Republican	Rod Beck	26,977	23.12
Republican	Milt Erhart	22,682	19.44
Total votes		116,660	100.00

General election
Party	Candidate	Votes	%	±%
Republican	Dirk Kempthorne	270,468	56.52	+4.97
Democratic	Richard H. Stallings	208,036	43.48	−4.97
Majority		62,432	13.05	+9.93
Turnout		478,504		
Republican hold		Swing		

== Illinois ==
Illinois election
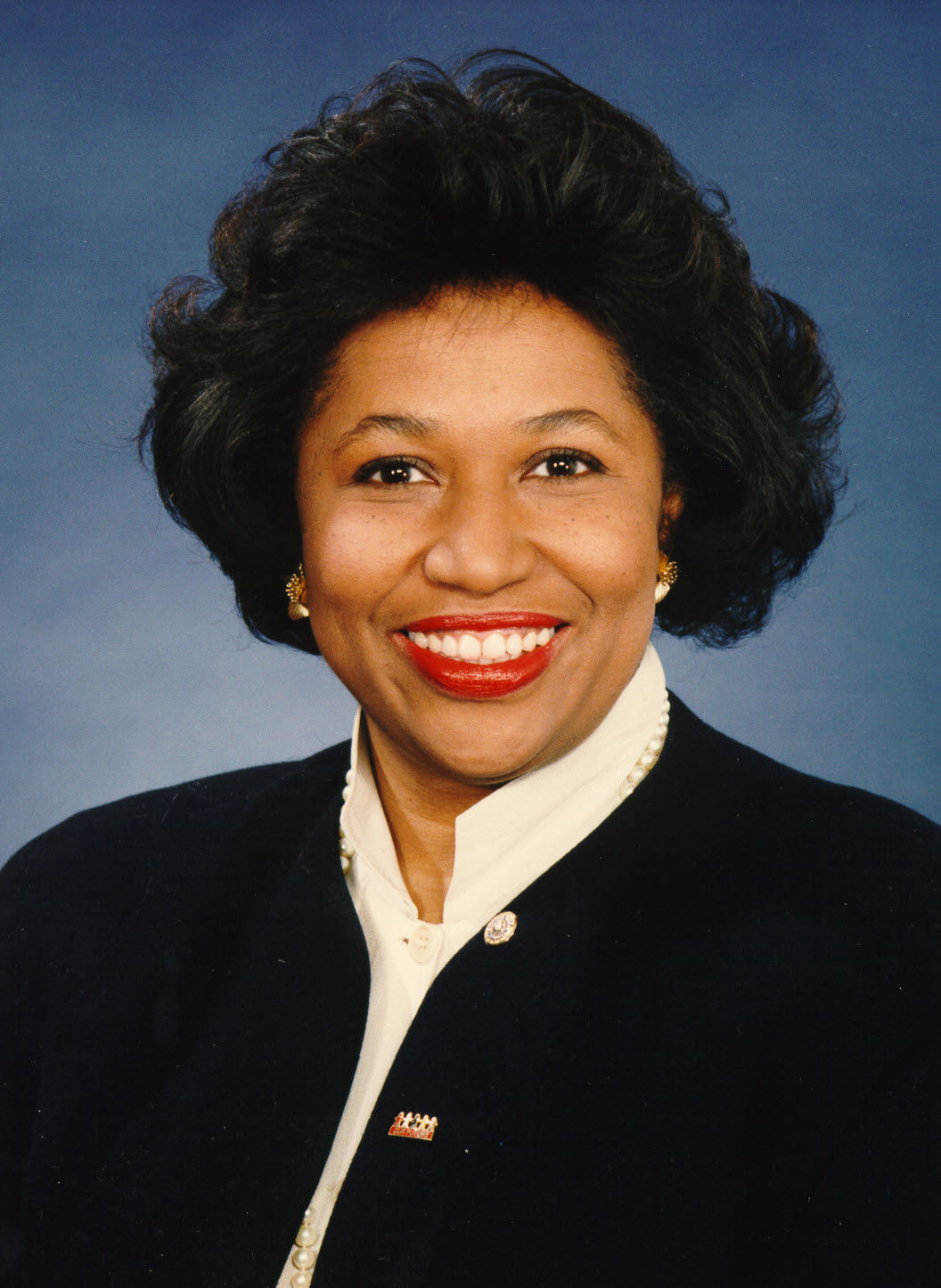

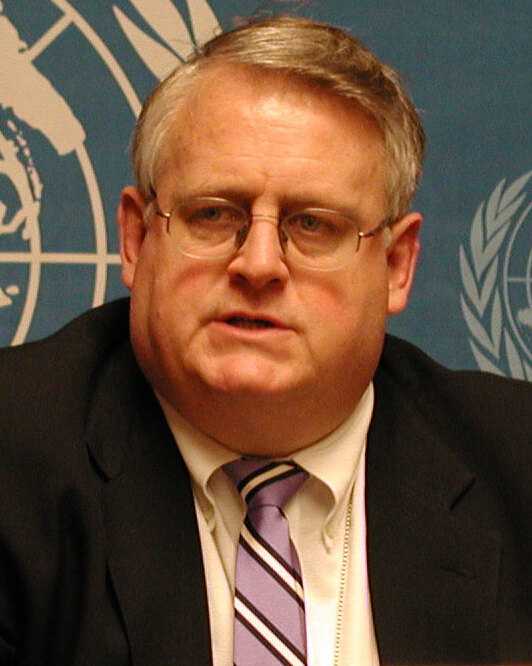
Nominee	Carol Moseley Braun	Richard S. Williamson
Party	Democratic	Republican
Popular vote	2,631,229	2,162,833
Percentage	53.0%	43.0%
- County Results; Braun: 40–50% 50–60% 60–70% Williamson: 40–50% 50–60%
U.S. senator before election
Alan J. Dixon
Democratic
Elected U.S. Senator
Carol Moseley Braun
Democratic

Incumbent Democrat Alan J. Dixon decided to run for re-election a third term, but was defeated in the primary against Carol Moseley Braun, Cook County Recorder of Deeds and former State Representative, who then won the general election over Republican Richard S. Williamson, former Assistant Secretary of State for International Organization Affairs. Braun (whose victory coincided with Bill Clinton's win in the presidential election and Illinois) made history in this election by becoming the first African-American woman ever elected to the U.S. Senate, and also the first African-American elected to the U.S. Senate as a Democrat.

Democratic Primary, United States Senate, 1992
Party	Candidate	Votes	%
Democratic	Carol Moseley Braun	557,694	38.0%
Democratic	Alan J. Dixon (Incumbent)	504,077	35.0%
Democratic	Albert Hofeld	394,497	18.0%

This defeat shocked observers; at the time no senator had been defeated in a primary in over a decade and Dixon had a long record of electoral success. He was a moderate Democrat, who recently voted to confirm Clarence Thomas to the Supreme Court. Braun, a black woman and known reformist liberal, got a large share of black, liberal, and women voters ("The Year of the Woman").

In addition, she carried Cook County, Illinois, by far the most populated county in the state. Another factor was the third candidate in the race, multi-millionaire attorney Al Hofeld. Hofeld drew away some of the moderate and conservative Democrats who normally supported Dixon. He also spent a lot of money running advertisements attacking Dixon, weakening his support.

Moseley Braun won the 1992 Illinois Senate Race by a fairly comfortable margin. Moseley Braun did well as expected in Cook County home of Chicago. Williamson did well in the Chicago collar counties, and most northern parts of the state. Moseley Braun had a surprisingly strong showing in southern Illinois, which Republicans had come to dominate in the last several decades. Braun also did well in Rock Island County.

1992 Illinois U.S. Senate Election
Party	Candidate	Votes	%	±%
Democratic	Carol Moseley Braun	2,631,229	53.3%	−3.8%
Republican	Richard S. Williamson	2,126,833	43.1%	+9.3%
Independent	Chad Koppie	100,422	2.0%	
Libertarian	Andrew B. Spiegel	34,527	0.7%	
Natural Law	Charles A. Winter	15,118	N/A%	
New Alliance	Alan J. Port	12,689	N/A%	
Socialist Workers	Kathleen Kaku	10,056	N/A%	
Populist	John Justice	8,656	N/A%	
Total votes		4,935,530	100.0%	
Majority		504,396	10.2%	
Democratic hold				

== Indiana ==
Indiana election
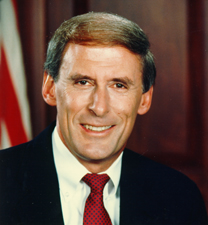

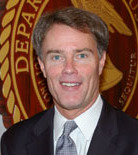
Nominee	Dan Coats	Joe Hogsett
Party	Republican	Democratic
Popular vote	1,267,972	900,148
Percentage	57.3%	40.8%
- County results Coats: 40–50% 50–60% 60–70% 70–80% Hogsett: 40–50% 50–60%
U.S. senator before election
Dan Coats
Republican
Elected U.S. Senator
Dan Coats
Republican

Incumbent Republican Dan Coats won re-election to his first full term, beating the Democratic Indiana Secretary of State Joe Hogsett.

When incumbent Republican Dan Quayle resigned from the Senate after being elected Vice President of the United States in 1988, Coats was appointed to Quayle's former seat. He then won election to serve the remainder of the term in 1990.

General election
Party	Candidate	Votes	%
Republican	Dan Coats (Incumbent)	1,267,972	57.3%
Democratic	Joseph Hogsett	900,148	40.8%
Libertarian	Steve Dillon	35,733	1.6%
New Alliance	Raymond Tirado	7,474	0.3%
No party	Write-Ins	99	0.0%
Majority		367,824	
Turnout		2,211,426	
Republican hold		Swing	

Coats won 79 of Indiana's counties compared to 13 for Hogsett.

== Iowa ==
Iowa election
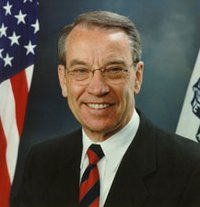

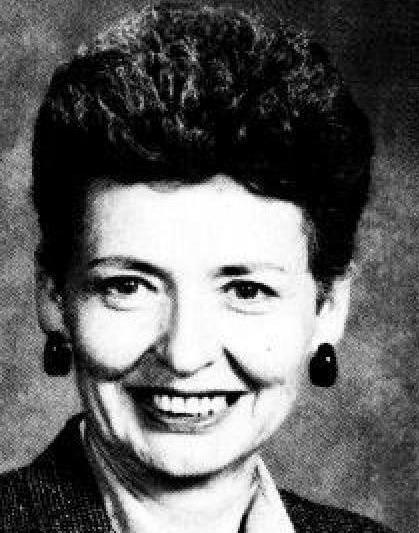
Nominee	Chuck Grassley	Jean Hall Lloyd-Jones
Party	Republican	Democratic
Popular vote	899,761	351,561
Percentage	69.6%	27.2%
- County results Grassley: 50-60% 60-70% 70-80% 80-90% >90%
U.S. senator before election
Chuck Grassley
Republican
Elected U.S. Senator
Chuck Grassley
Republican

Incumbent Republican Chuck Grassley ran for re-election to a third term in the United States Senate, which he won easily against his Democratic opponent, State senator Jean Hall Lloyd-Jones.

Democratic primary
Party	Candidate	Votes	%
Democratic	Jean Hall Lloyd-Jones	60,615	60.80
Democratic	Rosanne Freeburg	38,774	38.89
Democratic	Write-ins	307	0.31
Turnout		99,696	

Republican primary
Party	Candidate	Votes	%
Republican	Chuck Grassley (Incumbent)	109,273	99.70
Republican	Write-ins	324	0.30
Turnout		109,597	

1992 United States Senate election in Iowa
Party	Candidate	Votes	%	±%
Republican	Chuck Grassley (Incumbent)	899,761	69.61	+3.58
Democratic	Jean Hall Lloyd-Jones	351,561	27.20	−6.37
Natural Law	Stuart Zimmerman	16,403	1.27	
Independent	Sue Atkinson	6,277	0.49	
Independent	Mel Boring	5,508	0.43	
Independent	Rosanne Freeburg	4,999	0.39	
Grassroots	Carl Eric Olsen	3,404	0.26	
Independent	Richard O'Dell Hughes	2,918	0.23	
Socialist Workers	Cleve Andrew Pulley	1,370	0.11	
Write-ins		293	0.02	
Majority		548,200	42.41	+9.95
Turnout		1,292,494		
Republican hold		Swing		

== Kansas ==
Kansas election
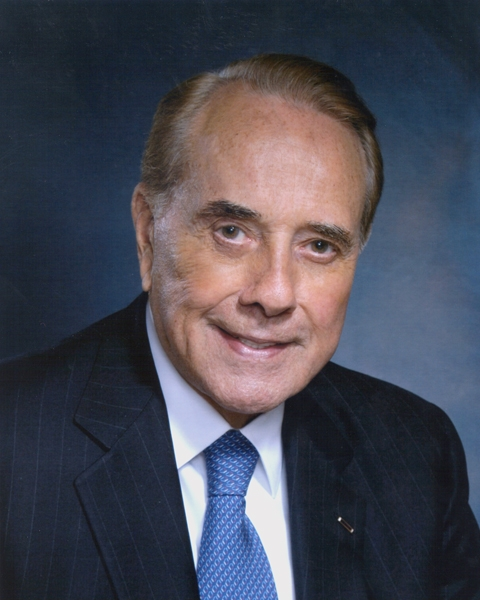

Nominee	Bob Dole	Gloria O'Dell
Party	Republican	Democratic
Popular vote	706,246	349,525
Percentage	62.70%	31.03%
- County results Dole: 40–50% 50–60% 60–70% 70–80%
U.S. senator before election
Bob Dole
Republican
Elected U.S. Senator
Bob Dole
Republican

Incumbent Republican senator Bob Dole won re-election to a fifth term, defeating Democratic nominee Gloria O'Dell, teacher and former journalist. Nearly two decades after his failed vice-presidential bid in 1976, this would be Dole's last election to the Senate. He would resign in 1996 while running for President of the United States. Dole also became the Republican Leader of the United States Senate seven years prior.

Kansas general election
Party	Candidate	Votes	%
Republican	Bob Dole (Incumbent)	706,246	62.70%
Democratic	Gloria O'Dell	349,525	31.03%
Independent	Christina Campbell-Cline	45,423	4.03%
Libertarian	Mark B. Kirk	25,253	2.24%
Majority		356,721	31.67%
Turnout		1,126,447	
Republican hold			

== Kentucky ==
Kentucky election
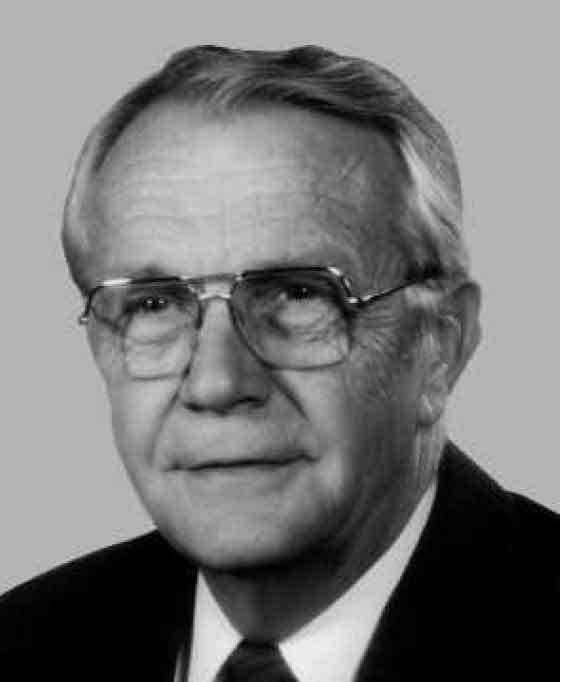

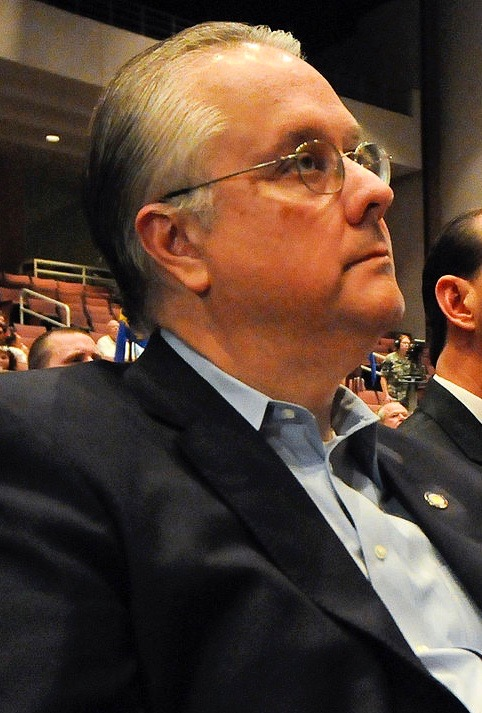
Nominee	Wendell Ford	David L. Williams
Party	Democratic	Republican
Popular vote	836,888	476,604
Percentage	62.9%	35.8%
- County results Ford: 40–50% 50–60% 60–70% 70–80% 80–90% Williams: 40–50% 50–60% 60–70% 70–80%
U.S. senator before election
Wendell Ford
Democratic
Elected U.S. Senator
Wendell Ford
Democratic

Incumbent Democratic U.S. senator Wendell Ford won re-election to a fourth term, easily beating Republican State senator David L. Williams. As of 2023, this was the last Senate election in Kentucky in which a Democrat won.

Denny Ormerod, a machinist from Louisville dropped out before the primary election. Though Williams and Thompson represented opposing factions in the state Republican Party – Williams managed Larry Hopkins' 1991 primary campaign while Thompson worked full-time for Hopkins' primary opponent Larry Forgy – the two virtually ignored each other in the primary campaign, choosing instead to focus their rhetoric against Ford. Thompson did question Williams' conservative credentials on grounds that he voted in favor of the tax increase associated with the Kentucky Education Reform Act. Ormerod's campaign largely focused on socially conservative issues, but it was Williams who secured the endorsement of Kentucky Right to Life, who cited his lawsuit to free three anti-abortion bills from committee in the 1992 legislative session. As a result of the largely uninspiring primary campaigns, there was only an 18% voter turnout in the Republican primary. Williams won the nomination.

Republican primary
Party	Candidate	Votes	%
Republican	David Williams	49,880	60.9%
Republican	Phillip Thompson	25,026	30.5%
Republican	Denny Ormerod	7,066	8.6%

Ford, the Senate Majority Whip and a former governor, raised $2.4 million for his campaign, about eight times the amount Williams raised. Given his limited finances, Williams relied on news conferences and interviews on small town radio stations to get his message out. Williams repeatedly lamented that Ford would not agree to a formal debate; Ford said that could not be arranged because Congress was still in session and he needed to be in Washington. During the campaign, Williams attempted to paint Ford as too liberal for Kentucky voters, citing his votes against the Gulf War and Clarence Thomas' confirmation to the U.S. Supreme Court. Both candidates declared their support for a Balanced Budget Amendment, but Williams said that Ford's support of pork barrel projects for the state and a procedural vote that kept the amendment from a vote in 1991 were evidence that Ford's support was not genuine.

Ford had no trouble winning on election night. Ford won easily, despite the fact that fellow Democrat Bill Clinton was not declared the winner of the presidential race in Kentucky until around 10:00 E.S.T. Ford pulled big margins out of the majority of Kentucky's 124 counties. This would be Ford's last term in the senate. He served his final term from January 3, 1993, to January 3, 1999. Ford died some fifteen years after his retirement at the age of 90.

General election
Party	Candidate	Votes	%
Democratic	Wendell H. Ford (Incumbent)	836,888	62.9%
Republican	David L. Williams	476,604	35.8%
Libertarian	James A. Ridenour	17,366	1.3%
Total votes		1,330,858	100.00%
Majority		360,208	27.1%
Democratic hold			

== Louisiana ==
Louisiana election
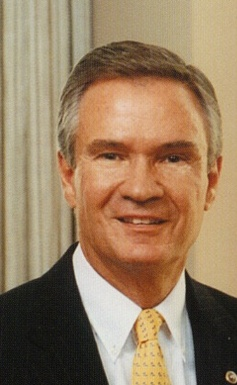

Nominee	John Breaux	Jon Khachaturian
Party	Democratic	Independent
Popular vote	616,021	74,785
Percentage	73.07%	8.87%
Nominee	Lyle Stocksill	Nick Joseph Accardo
Party	Republican	Democratic
Popular vote	69,986	45,839
Percentage	8.30%	5.44%
- Parish results Breaux: 50–60% 60–70% 70–80% 80–90%
U.S. senator before election
John Breaux
Democratic
Elected U.S. Senator
John Breaux
Democratic

Incumbent Democrat John Breaux won a majority in Louisiana's jungle primary on October 3, 1992, winning re-election to another term.

Jungle primary
Party	Candidate	Votes	%
Democratic	John Breaux (Incumbent)	616,021	73.07%
Independent	Jon Khachaturian	74,785	8.87%
Republican	Lyle Stocksill	69,986	8.30%
Democratic	Nick Joseph Accardo	45,839	5.44%
Republican	Fred Clegg Strong	36,406	4.32%
Majority		541,236	64.20%
Turnout		843,037	
Democratic hold			

== Maryland ==
Maryland election
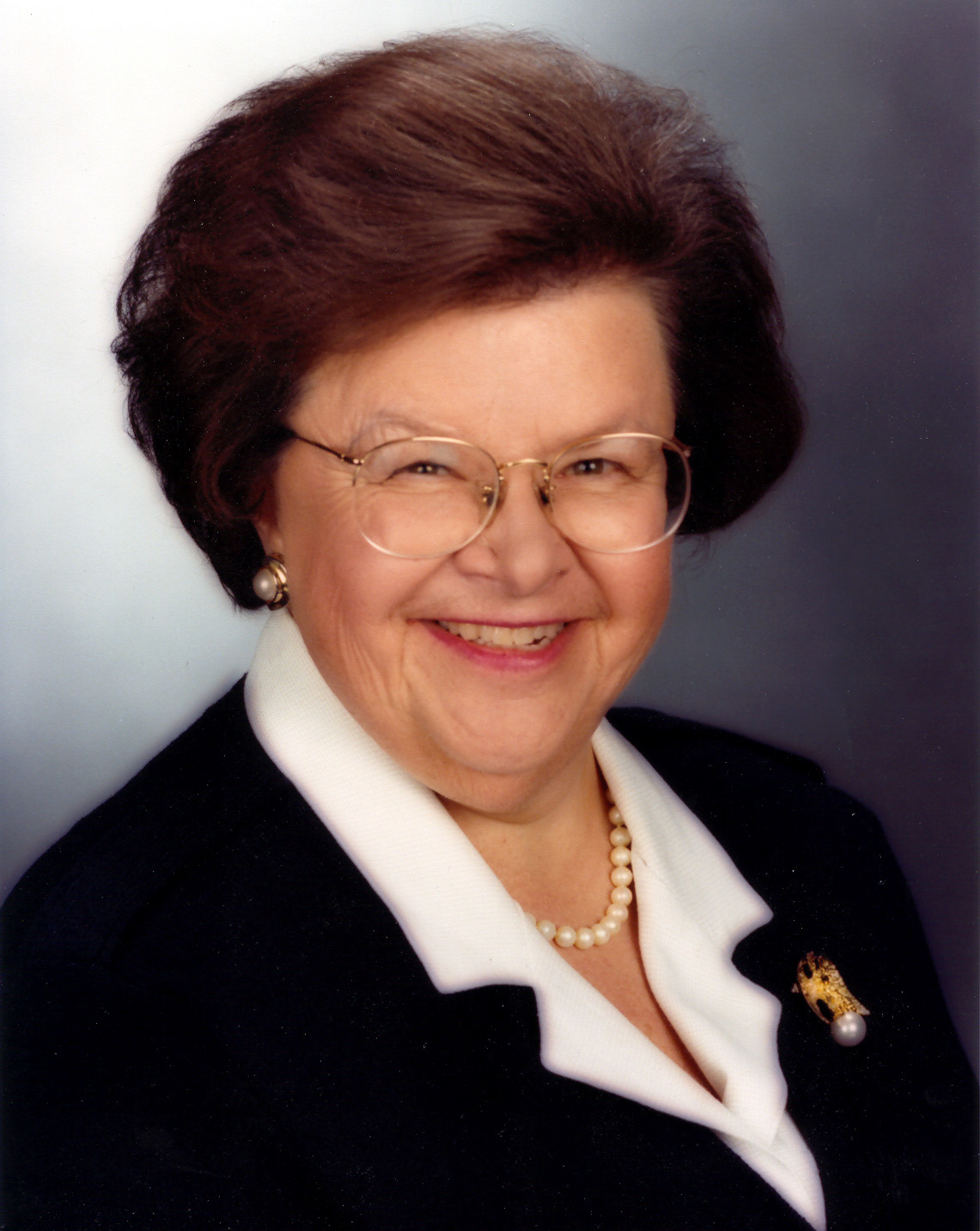

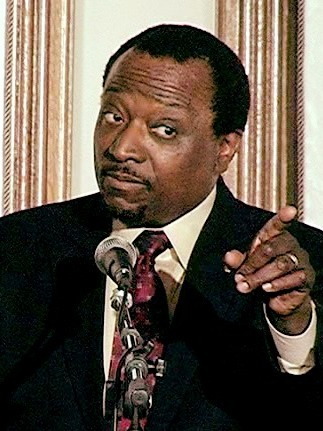
Nominee	Barbara Mikulski	Alan Keyes
Party	Democratic	Republican
Popular vote	1,307,610	533,688
Percentage	71.0%	28.9%
- County results Mikulski: 50–60% 60–70% 70–80% 80–90% Keyes: 50–60%
U.S. senator before election
Barbara Mikulski
Democratic
Elected U.S. Senator
Barbara Mikulski
Democratic

Incumbent Democrat Barbara Mikulski won re-election to a second term over Republican Alan Keyes, former Assistant Secretary of State for International Organization Affairs.

Democratic primary election
Party	Candidate	Votes	%
Democratic	Barbara A. Mikulski (Incumbent)	376,444	76.75%
Democratic	Thomas M. Wheatley	31,214	6.36%
Democratic	Walter Boyd	26,467	5.40%
Democratic	Don Allensworth	19,731	4.02%
Democratic	Scott David Britt	13,001	2.65%
Democratic	James Leonard White	12,470	2.54%
Democratic	B. Emerson Sweatt	11,150	2.27%
Total votes		490,477	100.00%

Republican primary election
Party	Candidate	Votes	%
Republican	Alan L. Keyes	95,831	45.94%
Republican	Martha Scanlan Klima	20,758	9.95%
Republican	Joseph I. Cassilly	16,091	7.71%
Republican	Ross Z. Pierpont	12,658	6.07%
Republican	S. Rob Sobhani	12,423	5.96%
Republican	John J. Bishop, Jr.	9,451	4.53%
Republican	Eugene R. Zarwell	6,535	3.13%
Republican	James Henry Berry	6,282	3.01%
Republican	Romie Allen Songer	6,030	2.89%
Republican	Joyce Friend-Nalepka	5,835	2.80%
Republican	Edward Robert Shannon	4,578	2.19%
Republican	Scott L. Meredith	4,372	2.10%
Republican	Stuart Hopkins	3,717	1.78%
Republican	Herman J. Hannan	2,771	1.33%
Republican	William H. Krehnbrink	1,258	0.60%
Total votes		208,590	100.00%

1992 United States Senate election in Maryland
Party	Candidate	Votes	%	±%
Democratic	Barbara A. Mikulski (Incumbent)	1,307,610	71.02%	+10.33%
Republican	Alan L. Keyes	533,688	28.98%	−10.33%
Majority		773,922	42.03%	+20.66%
Total votes		1,841,298	100.00%	
Democratic hold		Swing		

== Missouri ==
Missouri election
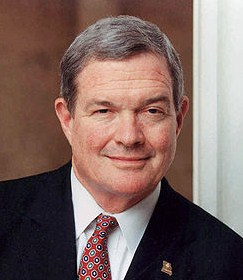

Nominee	Kit Bond	Geri Rothman-Serot
Party	Republican	Democratic
Popular vote	1,221,901	1,057,967
Percentage	51.2%	44.9%
- County results Bond: 40-50% 50-60% 60-70% 70-80% R-Serot: 40–50% 50–60% 60–70%
U.S. senator before election
Kit Bond
Republican
Elected U.S. Senator
Kit Bond
Republican

Incumbent Republican Kit Bond won re-election to a second term over Democratic St. Louis County Councilwoman Geri Rothman-Serot.

General election results
Party	Candidate	Votes	%
Republican	Kit Bond (incumbent)	1,221,901	51.2%
Democratic	Geri Rothman-Serot	1,057,967	44.9%
Libertarian	Jeanne Bojarski	75,048	3.2%
Total votes		2,354,916	100.00%
Majority		163,934	6.3%
Republican hold			

== Nevada ==
Nevada election
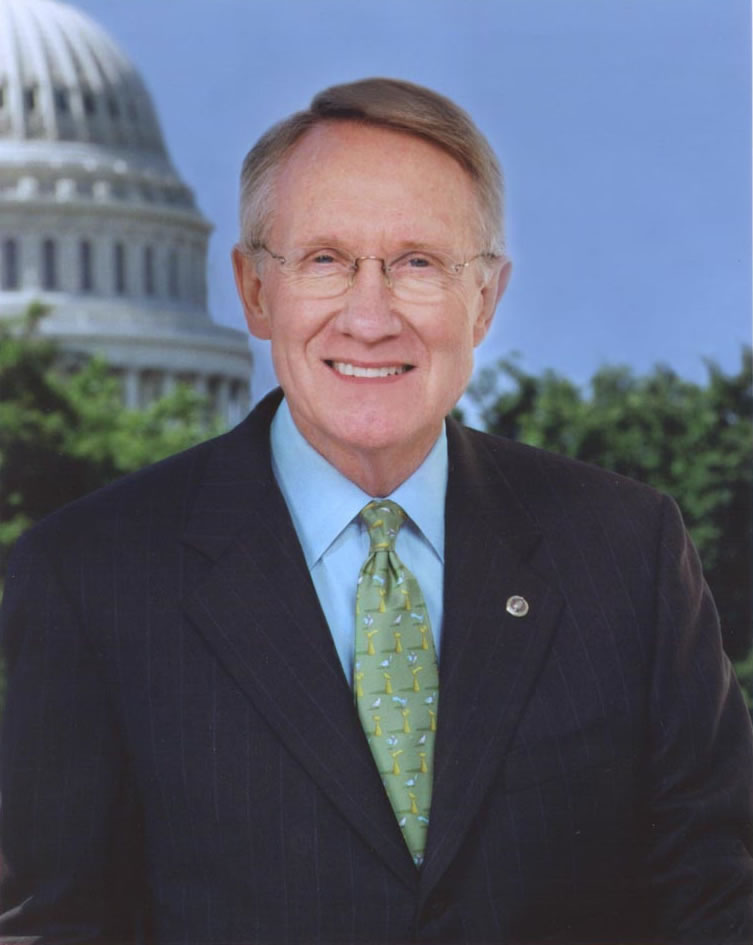

Nominee	Harry Reid	Demar Dahl
Party	Democratic	Republican
Popular vote	253,150	199,413
Percentage	51.0%	40.2%
- County results Reid: 40–50% 50–60% Dahl: 40–50% 50–60% 60–70%
U.S. senator before election
Harry Reid
Democratic
Elected U.S. Senator
Harry Reid
Democratic

Although nearly 10% of the electorate voted for neither of the two major U.S. political parties, incumbent Democrat Harry Reid ultimately beat Republican cattle rancher and President of Nevada Cattlemen's Association Demar Dahl.

General election
Party	Candidate	Votes	%	±%
Democratic	Harry Reid (Incumbent)	253,150	51.05%	+1.05%
Republican	Demar Dahl	199,413	40.21%	−4.30%
None of These Candidates		13,154	2.65%	-0.96%
Independent American	Joe S. Garcia	11,240	2.27%	
Natural Law	Lois Avery	7,279	1.47%	
Libertarian	Kent Cromwell	7,222	1.46%	−0.41%
Populist	Harry Tootle	4,429	0.89%	
Majority		53,737	10.84%	+5.36%
Turnout		495,887		
Democratic hold		Swing		

== New Hampshire ==
New Hampshire election

Nominee	Judd Gregg	John Rauh
Party	Republican	Democratic
Popular vote	249,591	234,982
Percentage	48.2%	45.4%
- Gregg: 40–50% 50–60% 60–70% 70–80% 80–90% >90% Rauh: 40–50% 50–60% 60–70% 80–90% Brady: >90% Tie: 50%
U.S. senator before election
Warren Rudman
Republican
Elected U.S. Senator
Judd Gregg
Republican

Incumbent Republican Warren Rudman decided to retire. Republican Governor Judd Gregg won the open seat, beating Democrat John Rauh, former CEO of Griffon Corporation.

NH U.S. Senate Election, 1992
Party	Candidate	Votes	%
Republican	Judd Gregg	249,591	48.2%
Democratic	John Rauh	234,982	45.4%
Libertarian	Katherine M. Alexander	18,214	3.5%
Independent	Larry Brady	9,340	1.8%
Independent	Ken Blevens	4,752	0.9%
Natural Law	David Haight	1,291	0.3%
Total votes		518,170	100.00%
Majority		14,609	2.8%
Republican hold			

== New York ==
New York election
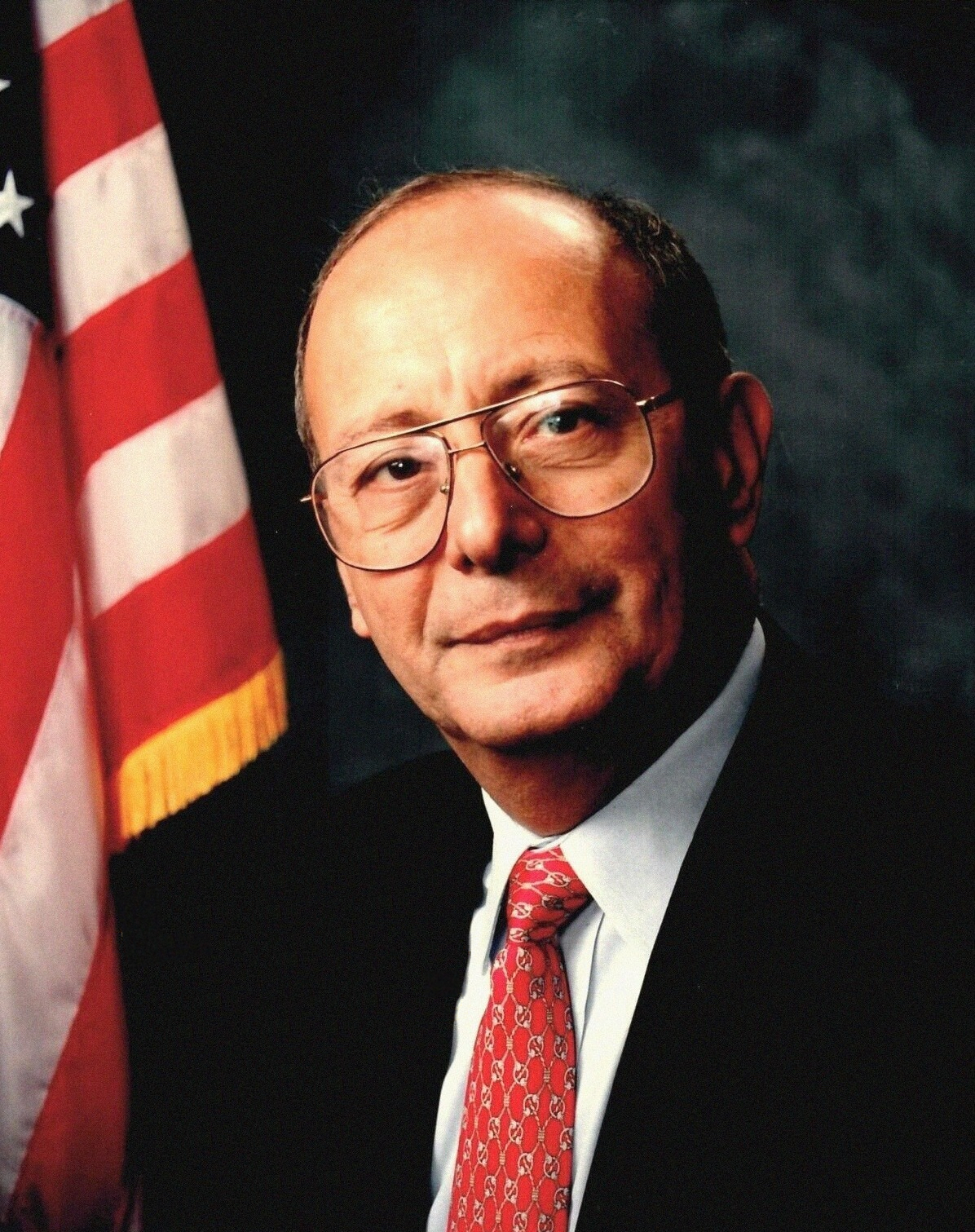

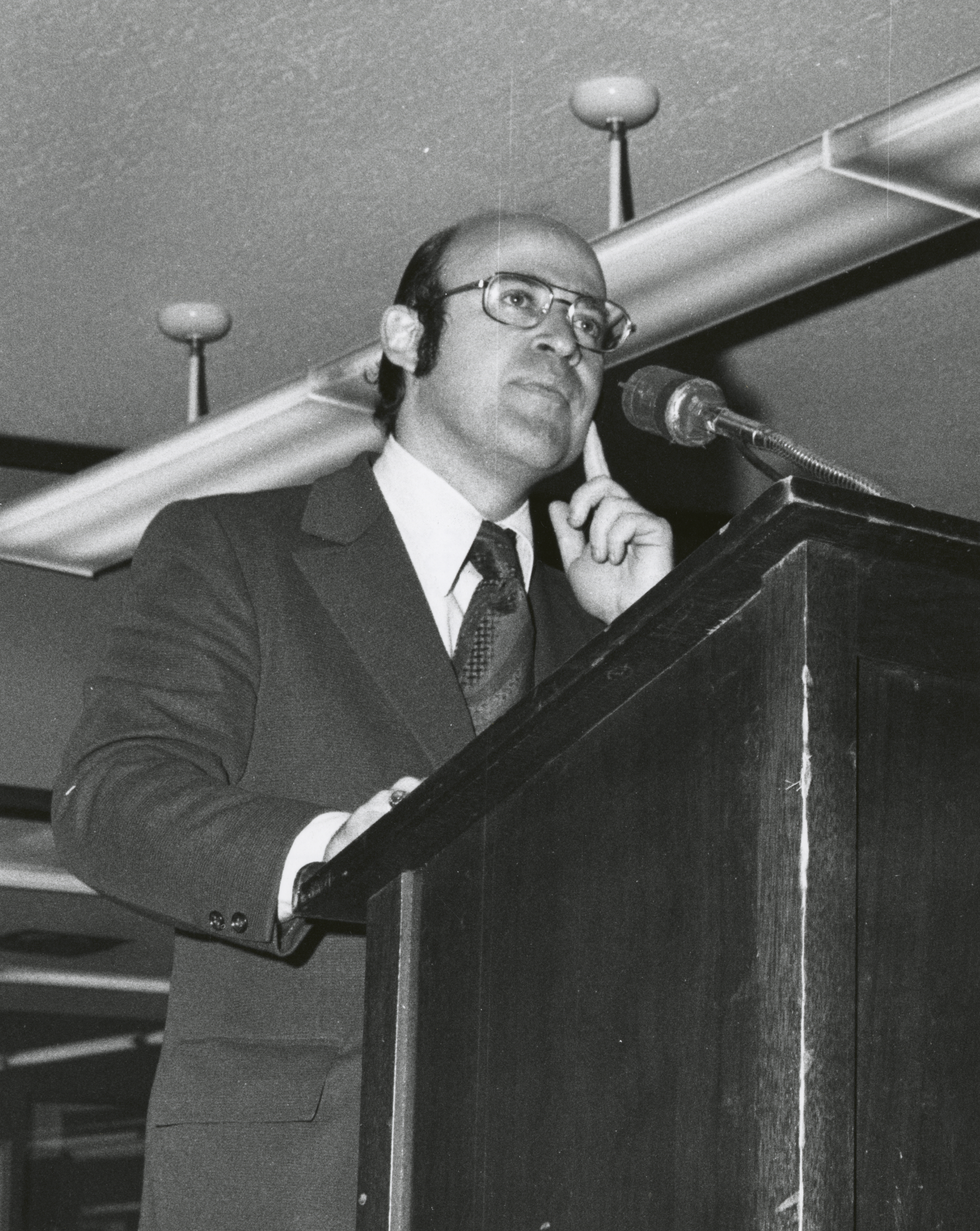
Nominee	Al D'Amato	Robert Abrams
Party	Republican	Democratic
Alliance	Parties: Conservative; Right to Life	Liberal
Popular vote	3,166,994	3,086,200
Percentage	49.0%	47.8%
- County results D'Amato: 40-50% 50-60% 60-70% Abrams: 40–50% 50–60% 60–70% 70–80%
U.S. senator before election
Al D'Amato
Republican
Elected U.S. Senator
Al D'Amato
Republican

Incumbent Republican Al D'Amato won re-election to a third term over Democrat Robert Abrams, New York State Attorney General and former Borough president of the Bronx. As of 2023, this was the last Senate election in New York won by a Republican.

Early in the campaign, environmentalist attorney, Laurance S. Rockefeller, Jr. nephew of the former governor Nelson, tried to challenge D'Amato in the Republican primary, but fell short of the required signatures to get onto the primary ballot. D'Amato summarily went unchallenged.

The Democratic primary campaign featured State Attorney General Robert Abrams, former U.S. Congresswoman and 1984 vice presidential candidate Geraldine Ferraro, Reverend Al Sharpton, Congressman Robert J. Mrazek, and New York City Comptroller and former Congresswoman Elizabeth Holtzman. Abrams was considered the early front-runner. Ferraro emphasized her career as a teacher, prosecutor, congresswoman, and mother, and talked about how she was tough on crime. Ferraro drew attacks from the media and her opponents over her husband John Zaccaro's finances and business relationships.

Ferraro became the front-runner, capitalizing on her star power from 1984 and using the campaign attacks against her as an explicitly feminist rallying point for women voters. As the primary date neared, her lead began to dwindle under the charges, and she released additional tax returns from the 1980s to try to defray the attacks. Holtzman ran a negative ad accusing Ferraro and Zaccaro of taking more than $300,000 in rent in the 1980s from a pornographer with purported ties to organized crime. The final debates were nasty, and Holtzman in particular constantly attacked Ferraro's integrity and finances. In an unusual election-eve television broadcast, Ferraro talked about the ethnic slurs made against her as an Italian-American. In the September 15, 1992 primary, Abrams edged out Ferraro by less than percentage point, winning 37 percent of the vote to 36 percent. Ferraro did not concede she had lost for two weeks.

After Abrams emerged as the nominee, the Democrats remained divided. In particular, Abrams spent much of the remainder of the campaign trying to get Ferraro's endorsement. Ferraro, enraged and bitter after the nature of the primary, ignored Abrams and accepted Bill Clinton's request to campaign for his presidential bid instead. She was eventually persuaded by state party leaders into giving an unenthusiastic endorsement with just three days to go before the general election, in exchange for an apology by Abrams for the tone of the primary.

Abrams was also criticized for calling D'Amato a fascist, and he narrowly lost the general election as a result of these controversies.

General election
Party	Candidate	Votes	%
Republican	Al D'Amato	2,652,822	
Conservative	Al D'Amato	289,258	
Right to Life	Al D'Amato	224,914	
Total	Al D'Amato (Incumbent)	3,166,994	49.0%
Democratic	Robert Abrams	2,943,001	
Liberal	Robert Abrams	143,199	
Total	Robert Abrams	3,086,200	47.8%
Libertarian	Norma Segal	108,530	1.7%
New Alliance	Mohammad T. Mehdi	56,631	0.9%
Natural Law	Stanley Nelson	23,747	0.4%
Socialist Workers	Eddie Warren	16,724	0.3%
Total votes		6,458,826	100.00%
Majority		80,794	1.2%
Republican hold			

== North Carolina ==
North Carolina election
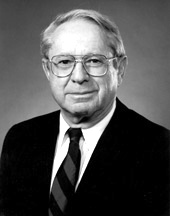

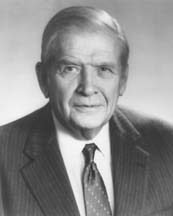
Nominee	Lauch Faircloth	Terry Sanford
Party	Republican	Democratic
Popular vote	1,297,892	1,194,015
Percentage	50.35%	46.32%
- County results Faircloth: 40–50% 50–60% 60–70% 70–80% Sanford: 40–50% 50–60% 60–70% 70–80% Tie: 40–50%
U.S. senator before election
Terry Sanford
Democratic
Elected U.S. Senator
Lauch Faircloth
Republican

Incumbent Democrat Terry Sanford lost re-election to a second term to Republican Lauch Faircloth, former State Secretary of Commerce.

1992 North Carolina U.S. Senate Republican primary election
Party	Candidate	Votes	%
Republican	Lauch Faircloth	129,159	47.74%
Republican	Sue Myrick	81,801	30.23%
Republican	Eugene Johnston	46,112	17.04%
Republican	Larry Harrington	13,496	4.99%
Turnout		270,568	

In 1990, after 40 years as a Democrat, Faircloth switched his party registration and began preparations to seek the Republican Senate nomination in 1992. Enjoying the support of senator Jesse Helms's political organization, Faircloth defeated Charlotte mayor Sue Myrick and former congressman Walter E. Johnston, III in the primary. His opponent in the general election was his former ally, Terry Sanford. Although Sanford had helped Faircloth raise money for his failed gubernatorial bid in 1984, he angered Faircloth two years later when he allegedly dismissed Faircloth's chances in a statewide contest if the two ran against each other for the Democratic nomination for the Senate. Faircloth withdrew from the 1986 race after Sanford "blindsided" him by announcing his candidacy.

Faircloth attacked Sanford as a tax-and-spend liberal, and despite a poor performance in a September televised debate, Faircloth won the seat by a 100,000-vote margin. Sanford may have been weakened by his unpopular vote against authorizing military force in the Persian Gulf War, and he suffered health problems in the summer of 1992.

1992 North Carolina U.S. Senate election
Party	Candidate	Votes	%	±%
Republican	Lauch Faircloth	1,297,892	50.35%	+2.11%
Democratic	Terry Sanford (Incumbent)	1,194,015	46.32%	–5.44%
Libertarian	Bobby Yates Emory	85,948	3.33%	N/A
Turnout		2,577,855		
Majority		103,877	4.03%	
Republican gain from Democratic		Swing		

== North Dakota ==
Due to the death of Quentin Burdick in September of that year, there were two senate elections in North Dakota.

=== North Dakota (regular) ===
North Dakota general election
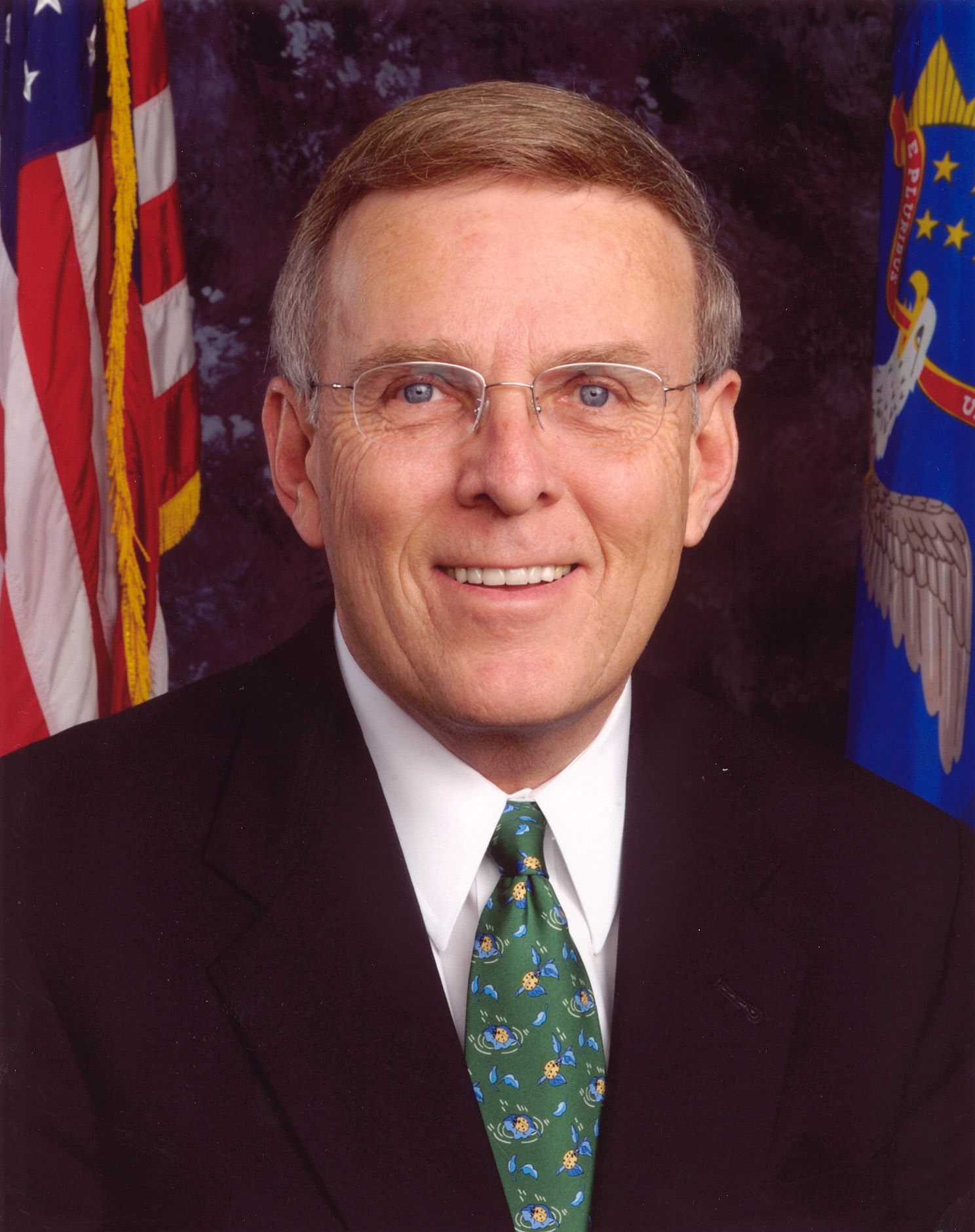

Nominee	Byron Dorgan	Steve Sydness
Party	Democratic–NPL	Republican
Popular vote	179,347	118,162
Percentage	59.0%	38.9%
- County results Dorgan: 50–60% 60–70% 70–80% Sydness: 50–60%
U.S. senator before election
Kent Conrad
Democratic
Elected U.S. Senator
Byron Dorgan
Democratic

Incumbent North Dakota Democratic NPL Party incumbent Kent Conrad retired, having given a pledge that he would not run for re-election if the federal budget deficit was higher than when he was first elected; however when the other Senate seat became vacant, he ran in the special election. Dem-NPL U.S. Congressman Byron Dorgan won the open seat, beating Republican Steve Sydness, CEO of Endurance International Group.

North Dakota general election
Party	Candidate	Votes	%
Democratic–NPL	Byron Dorgan	179,347	59.00%
Republican	Steve Sydness	118,162	38.87%
Independent	Tom Asbridge	6,448	2.12%
Turnout		303,957	
Total votes		6,458,826	100.00%
Majority		61,185	20.13%
Democratic hold			

=== North Dakota (special) ===
North Dakota special election
- December 4, 1992
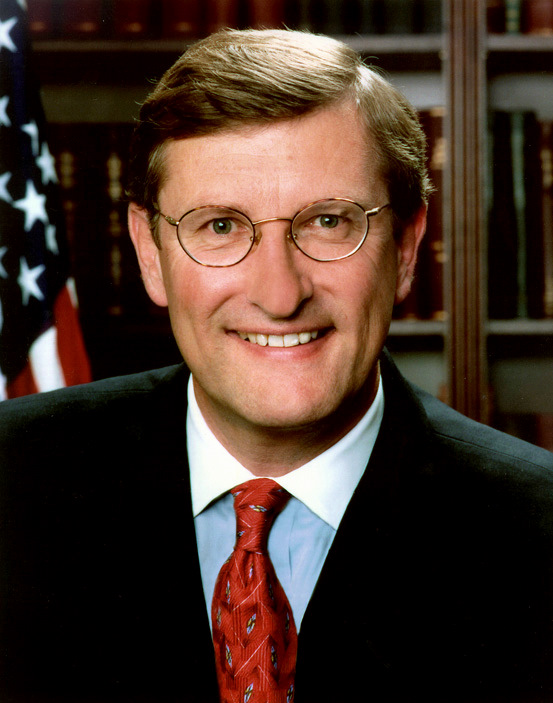

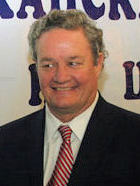
Nominee	Kent Conrad	Jack Dalrymple
Party	Democratic–NPL	Republican
Popular vote	103,246	55,194
Percentage	63.2%	33.8%
- County results Conrad: 50–60% 60–70% 70–80% Dalrymple: 40–50% 50–60%
U.S. senator before election
Jocelyn Burdick
Democratic
Elected U.S. Senator
Kent Conrad
Democratic

The special election was held December 4, 1992 to fill the United States Senate seat vacated by the late Quentin Burdick. Burdick's widow, Jocelyn Burdick, was appointed as a temporary replacement until the election was held. Dem-NPLer Kent Conrad, who held North Dakota's other senate seat for one term since 1986, had not run for re-election to his own seat, holding himself to a campaign promise pledging to reduce the federal deficit. U.S. senator Kent Conrad won the election over Republican State Representative Jack Dalrymple.

Burdick's death provided an opportunity for Conrad to return to the Senate in a fight for an open seat. However, some, particularly his political opponents, saw this as a breach of his promise in spirit if not letter, Conrad's high approval ratings as senator carried through to a victory against Republican state legislator Jack Dalrymple.

General election results
Party	Candidate	Votes	%	±%
Democratic–NPL	Kent Conrad (incumbent)	103,246	63.22	73.57
Republican	Jack Dalrymple	55,194	33.80	
Independent	Darold Larson	4,871	2.98	
Majority				
Turnout		163,311		
Democratic hold		Swing		

== Ohio ==
Ohio election
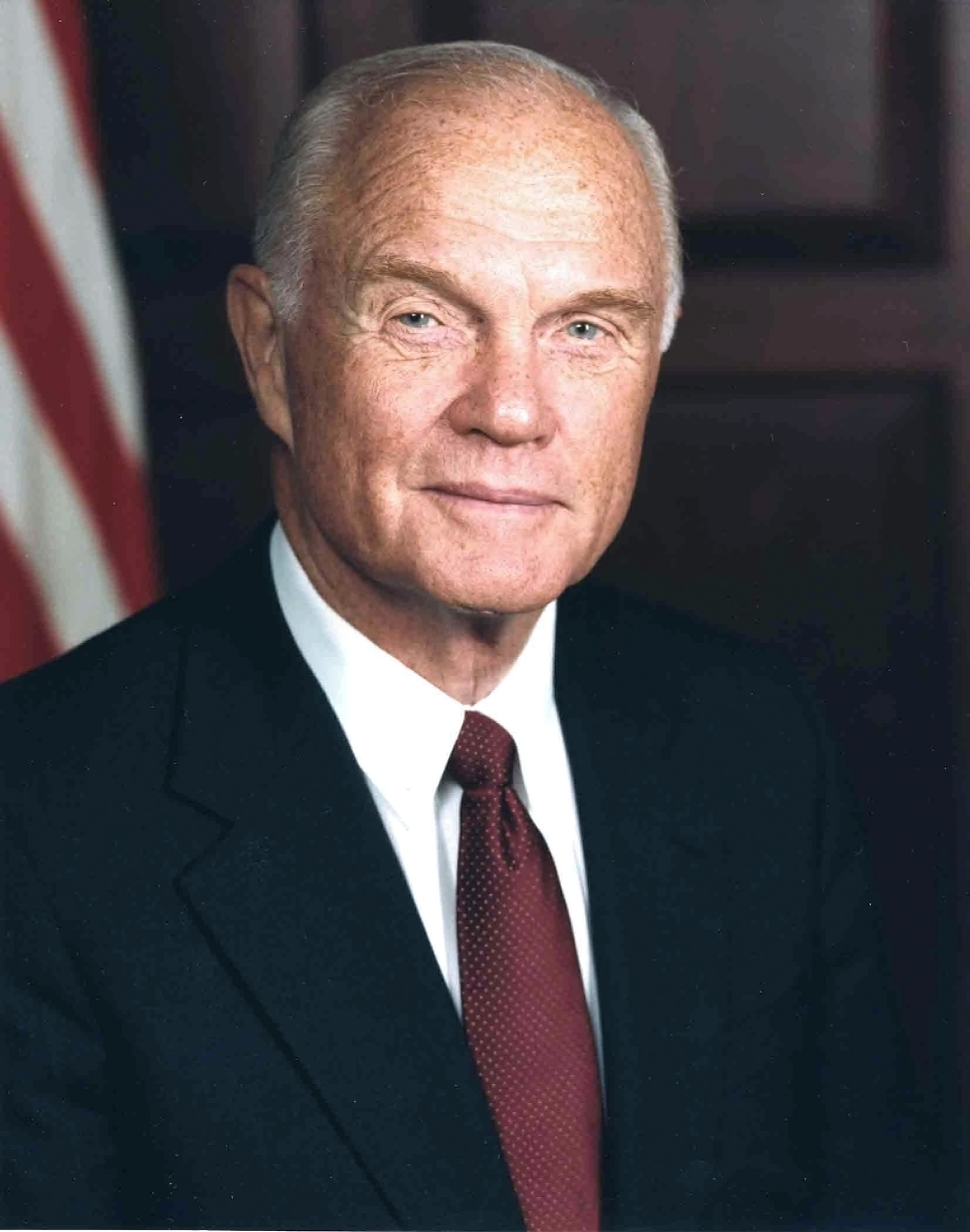

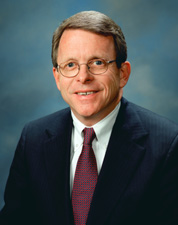
Nominee	John Glenn	Mike DeWine
Party	Democratic	Republican
Popular vote	2,444,419	2,028,300
Percentage	51.0%	42.3%
Nominee	Martha Grevatt
Party	Workers World
Popular vote	321,234
Percentage	6.7%
- Glenn: 40–50% 50–60% 60–70% 70–80% 80–90% DeWine: 40–50% 50–60% 60–70% 70–80% 80–90% Grevatt: 40–50% Tie: 40–50%
U.S. senator before election
John Glenn
Democratic
Elected U.S. Senator
John Glenn
Democratic

Incumbent Democrat John Glenn won re-election to a fourth term, coinciding with Bill Clinton's narrow win during the presidential election. Glenn's voting percentage of 51% over Republican Lieutenant Governor of Ohio Mike DeWine represented the worst performance of his four runs for the Senate, likely due to the presence of third-party candidate Martha Grevatt of the far-left Workers World Party. This was the last time the Democrats won the Class 3 Senate seat in Ohio until 2026.

General election results
Party	Candidate	Votes	%
Democratic	John Glenn (Incumbent)	2,444,419	50.99%
Republican	Mike DeWine	2,028,300	42.31%
Workers World	Martha Grevatt	321,234	6.70%
Majority		416,119	8.68%
Turnout		4,793,953	
Democratic hold			

== Oklahoma ==
Oklahoma election
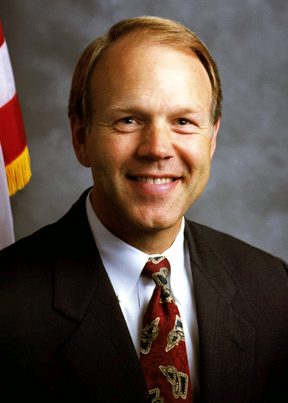

Nominee	Don Nickles	Steve Lewis
Party	Republican	Democratic
Popular vote	757,876	494,350
Percentage	58.6%	38.2%
- County results Nickles: 40-50% 50-60% 60-70% 70-80% Lewis: 40–50% 50–60%
U.S. senator before election
Don Nickles
Republican
Elected U.S. Senator
Don Nickles
Republican

Incumbent Republican Don Nickles won re-election to his third term, beating Democratic former State Representative Steve Lewis.

OK U.S. Senate Election, 1992
Party	Candidate	Votes	%
Republican	Don Nickles (Incumbent)	757,876	58.6%
Democratic	Steve Lewis	494,350	38.2%
Independent	Roy V. Edwards	21,225	1.6%
Independent	Thomas D. Ledgerwood II	20,972	1.6%
Total votes		1,294,423	100.00%
Majority		263,526	20.4%
Republican hold			

== Oregon ==
Oregon election
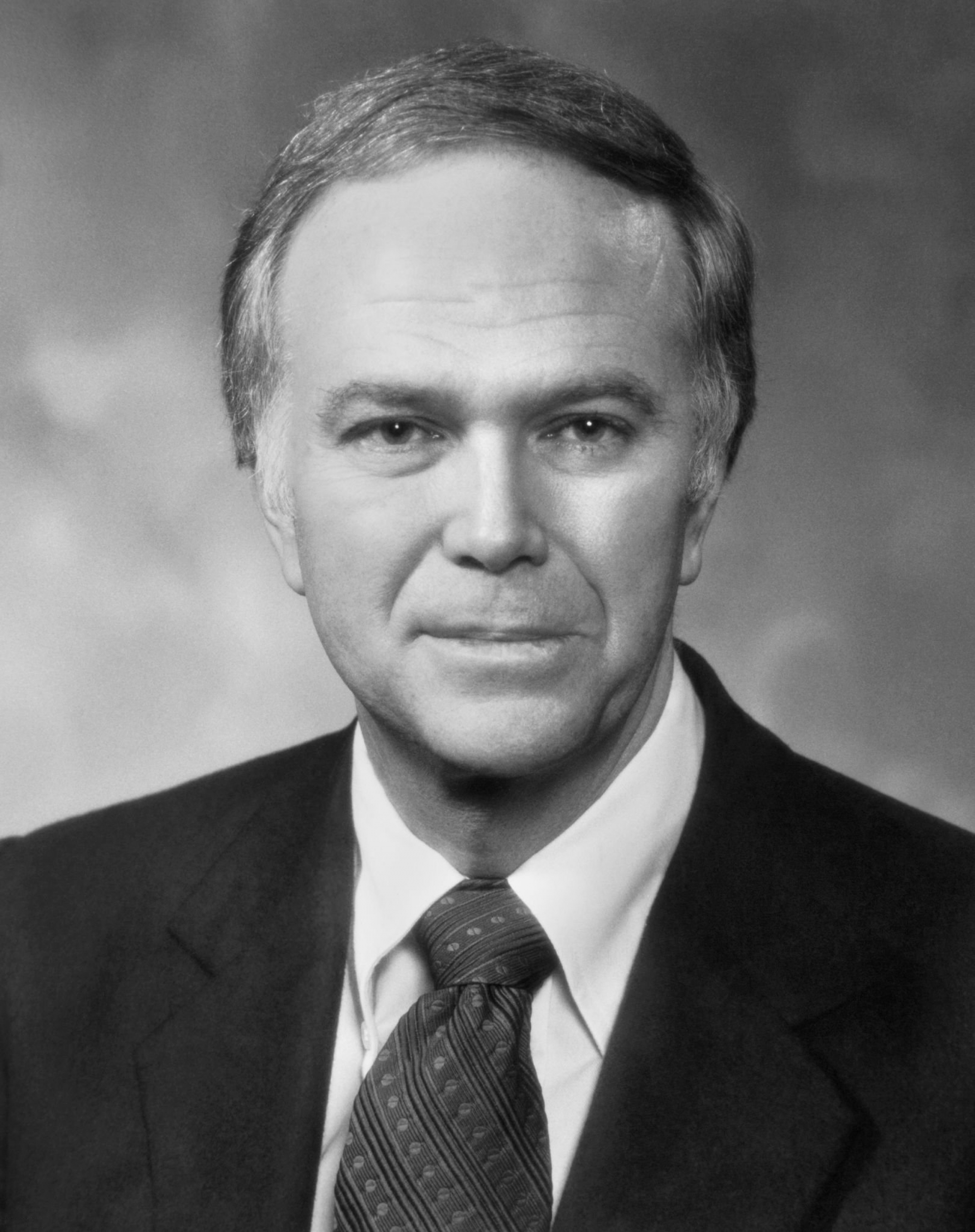

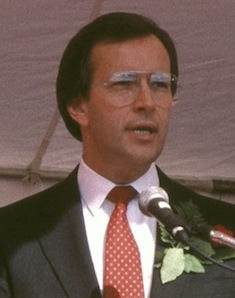
Nominee	Bob Packwood	Les AuCoin
Party	Republican	Democratic
Popular vote	717,455	639,851
Percentage	52.1%	46.5%
- County results Packwood: 50-60% 60-70% 70-80% AuCoin: 40–50% 50–60%
U.S. senator before election
Bob Packwood
Republican
Elected U.S. Senator
Bob Packwood
Republican

Incumbent Republican Bob Packwood won re-election to his fifth term.

As the election season got underway, analysts from both major parties predicted that Packwood would have one of the toughest seats to defend in what was anticipated to be a volatile election year. Packwood was regarded as one of the nation's "most powerful elected officials" with "extraordinary political instincts." But the state's largest newspaper, The Oregonian, had described AuCoin (Packwood's presumed main challenger) as having "persistence, imagination and clout [that] have made him the most powerful congressman in Oregon and one of the most influential members from the Northwest."

For AuCoin, however, first came the Democratic primary. He faced Portland attorney Joe Wetzel and Bend businessman Harry Lonsdale in what became a "brutal, bitter" contest. Lonsdale, who had run a close race against incumbent Mark Hatfield for Oregon's other Senate seat in 1990, emerged as AuCoin's principal rival; Wetzel, who criticized Packwood and AuCoin as long-term, ineffective members of Congress, trailed throughout the race, and was not invited to an April debate sponsored by the City Club of Portland. Lonsdale took on "the Les AuCoin-Mark Hatfield-Bob Packwood coalition" as his primary cause, stating "I consider Les AuCoin a good man who has been corrupted by PAC money over the years".

In a race the Seattle Times called "as negative as many voters can remember," Lonsdale attacked AuCoin as "corrupt" and tied to the timber industry. Lonsdale's environmental credentials also came under scrutiny, and AuCoin noted Lonsdale's reversal of support for nuclear power and belated opposition to the re-opening of Trojan Nuclear Power Plant. AuCoin turned accusations of undue influence back on Lonsdale, pointing out that his company (Bend Research) had received millions in federal defense contracts.

Even during the primary, Packwood and AuCoin traded barbs on various issues. Packwood joined Lonsdale in criticizing AuCoin for his involvement in what was reported as a rash of check-bouncing among members of Congress; AuCoin characterized the issue as a series of mistakes, rather than gross abuses. In what was believed to be an unprecedented move, Packwood attempted to influence the Democratic primary's outcome by running television ads against AuCoin.

Ultimately, the results of the Democratic primary were so close that an automatic recount was triggered. AuCoin held a news conference on May 23 in the South Park Blocks stating he would wait for the recount, but the margin was currently 248 votes in his favor. On June 18, over a month after the primary election, AuCoin was certified as having won by 330 votes. Upon conceding the race, Lonsdale pondered mounting a write-in campaign, reiterating that Oregon needed an "outsider" in the Senate.

Democratic primary for the United States Senate from Oregon, 1992
Party	Candidate	Votes	%
Democratic	Les AuCoin	153,029	42.18%
Democratic	Harry Lonsdale	152,699	42.09%
Democratic	Joseph Wetzel	31,183	8.87%
Democratic	Bob Bell	23,700	6.53%
Democratic	miscellaneous	1,194	0.33%
Total votes		361,805	100.00%

Packwood had gone through a divorce in 1991, and his ex-wife threatened to run against him amid mounting concerns about his "eye for the ladies." The socially conservative Oregon Citizens Alliance (OCA) was at the apex of its statewide prominence with 1992's anti-gay Measure 9 and its newly formed American Heritage Party (AHP). The group endorsed Republican challenger Joe Lutz, who had run against Packwood in the past on a family values platform; but Lutz soon withdrew, announcing a divorce of his own. As early as January, the OCA considered backing former gubernatorial candidate Al Mobley as an independent or as a member of the AHP. Mobley ultimately decided in mid-August not to run, stating that he could not bear the idea that he might be responsible for causing AuCoin to be elected. Packwood's most significant challenge thus came from little-known conservative Medford attorney John DeZell, who campaigned on the family values issue. Packwood cruised to victory over DeZell and several other candidates.

Republican primary for the United States Senate from Oregon, 1992
Party	Candidate	Votes	%
Republican	Bob Packwood (incumbent)	176,939	59.10%
Republican	John DeZell	61,128	20.42%
Republican	Stephanie J. Salvey	27,088	9.05%
Republican	Randy Prince	20,358	6.80%
Republican	Valentine Christian	10,501	3.51%
Republican	miscellaneous	3,397	1.14%
Total votes		299,411	100.00%

By the end of June, when the recount was complete, AuCoin was nearly out of campaign funds; Packwood entered the general election race with $3.2 million and was ranked sixth nationwide among senators raising funds outside their home state during the 1990–1992 election season.

AuCoin opposed weakening the Endangered Species Act (ESA) to erase the Northern Spotted Owl's impact on the timber industry, but Packwood (“one of the timber industry’s chief allies,” according to Oregon State University political scientist William Lunch) assailed “environmental extremists” and introduced legislation to convene a presidential cabinet committee to exempt the endangered owl from the ESA.

In September, Packwood pulled ads that had falsely criticized AuCoin for missing votes while speaking to special interest groups. By October, Packwood had raised $8 million, spending $5.4 million more than AuCoin, and leading all Senate incumbents. Yet that fall, the two candidates were in a dead heat, with Packwood continuing to criticize AuCoin on attendance, his House bank account and the spotted owl, and AuCoin echoing the campaign of popular Presidential candidate Bill Clinton by accusing Packwood of favoring the wealthy over the middle class.

The outcome of the bruising race was too close to call on election night, but on the following day, Packwood emerged as the winner with about 52% of the vote to AuCoin's 47. In his victory press conference, Packwood endorsed AuCoin for Secretary of the Interior in the Clinton administration. When told of Packwood's comments, AuCoin responded by saying "I think that's real special."

General election
Party	Candidate	Votes	%
Republican	Bob Packwood (Incumbent)	717,455	52.14%
Democratic	Les AuCoin	639,851	46.50%
Write-In	Miscellaneous	12,934	0.94%
Independent	Harry Lonsdale	5,793	0.42%
Total votes		1,376,033	100.00%
Majority		77,604	5.64%
Republican hold			

== Pennsylvania ==
Pennsylvania election
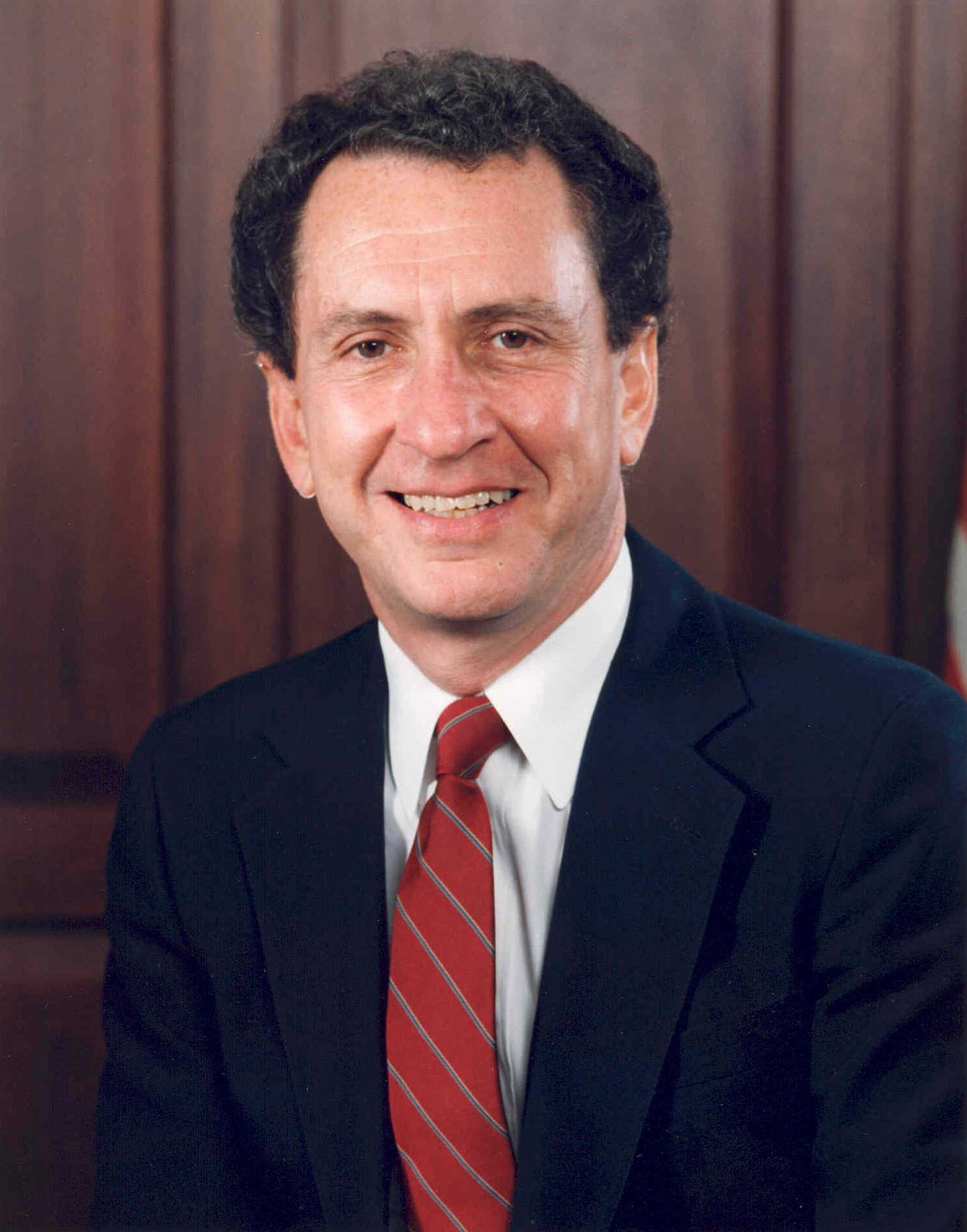

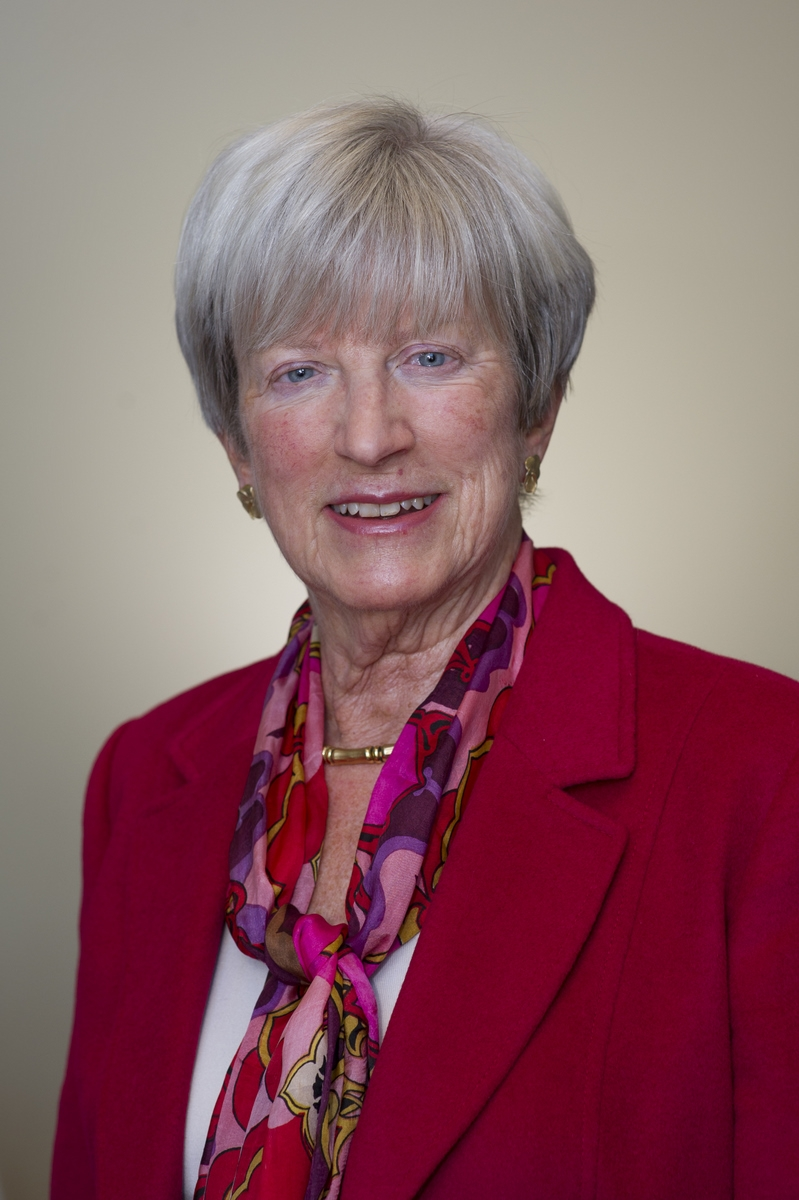
Nominee	Arlen Specter	Lynn Yeakel
Party	Republican	Democratic
Popular vote	2,358,125	2,224,966
Percentage	49.1%	46.3%
- Specter: 30–40% 40–50% 50–60% 60–70% 70–80% 80–90% >90% Yeakel: 30–40% 40–50% 50–60% 60–70% 70–80% 80–90% >90% Tie: 40–50% No data
U.S. senator before election
Arlen Specter
Republican
Elected U.S. Senator
Arlen Specter
Republican

Incumbent Republican Arlen Specter won re-election to a third term over Democratic millionaire Lynn Yeakel director of women's studies at Drexel University College of Medicine and daughter of former U.S. Congressman Porter Hardy of Virginia (from Montgomery County).

Despite his powerful position in the Senate, Specter had numerous problems entering the election. A moderate who generally received only tepid support from his party's conservative wing, he was criticized by the right for opposing Ronald Reagan's nomination of Robert Bork to the Supreme Court. Specter subsequently faced a primary challenge from an ultra-conservative State Representative named Stephen Freind; although the incumbent won handily, the battle was expensive and featured many damaging attack ads. The senator was also highly targeted by women's groups for his involvement in the Clarence Thomas proceedings; in his questioning of Anita Hill, Specter appeared to show no sympathy for her allegations of sexual harassment. Furthermore, President Bush's popularity was rapidly declining in the state over high unemployment rates and was subsequently dragging down Republican candidates.

Yeakel won the five-way primary with 45% of the vote, easily defeating the endorsed candidate, Lieutenant Governor Mark Singel, in an election cycle dubbed by pundits as the "year of the woman." Polls put her ahead of Specter by double digits. But Specter ran a campaign that was praised by political analysts for being almost flawless. Despite Yeakel's personal wealth, her inexperience in politics led to fund raising problems; in turn, Specter ran television ads long before the Democrat. The moderate Specter portrayed Yeakel, despite her liberal attitude, as a member of an elitist blue-blood family; he emphasized her father's votes against the Civil Rights Act of 1964 while in Congress, her affiliation with an all-white country club, and her church's minister's vocal criticism of the Israeli government.

Despite her mistakes, including a frequent tendency to mispronounce the names of places in which she was campaigning, Yeakel continued to perform solidly, and on Election Day, she captured by large numbers the traditional Democratic strongholds of the state, such as Pittsburgh, Scranton, and Erie. However, Specter undercut Yeakel's support in the state's most critical Democratic county: Philadelphia. Specter campaigned hard in black neighborhoods and received the endorsement of the NAACP. Furthermore, he capitalized on the ambivalence of many Philadelphia Democratic leaders to Yeakel, a self-described reform candidate; as a result, the hugely Democratic city featured a higher than anticipated vote for Specter. Also critical to the campaign was Specter's grassroots involvement in Yeakel's base, the traditionally GOP but Democratic-trending suburbs of Philadelphia.

General election
Party	Candidate	Votes	%
Republican	Arlen Specter (Incumbent)	2,358,125	49.10%
Democratic	Lynn Yeakel	2,224,966	46.33%
Libertarian	John Perry	219,319	4.57%
Total votes		4,822,410	100.00%
Majority		113,159	2.3%
Republican hold			

== South Carolina ==
South Carolina election
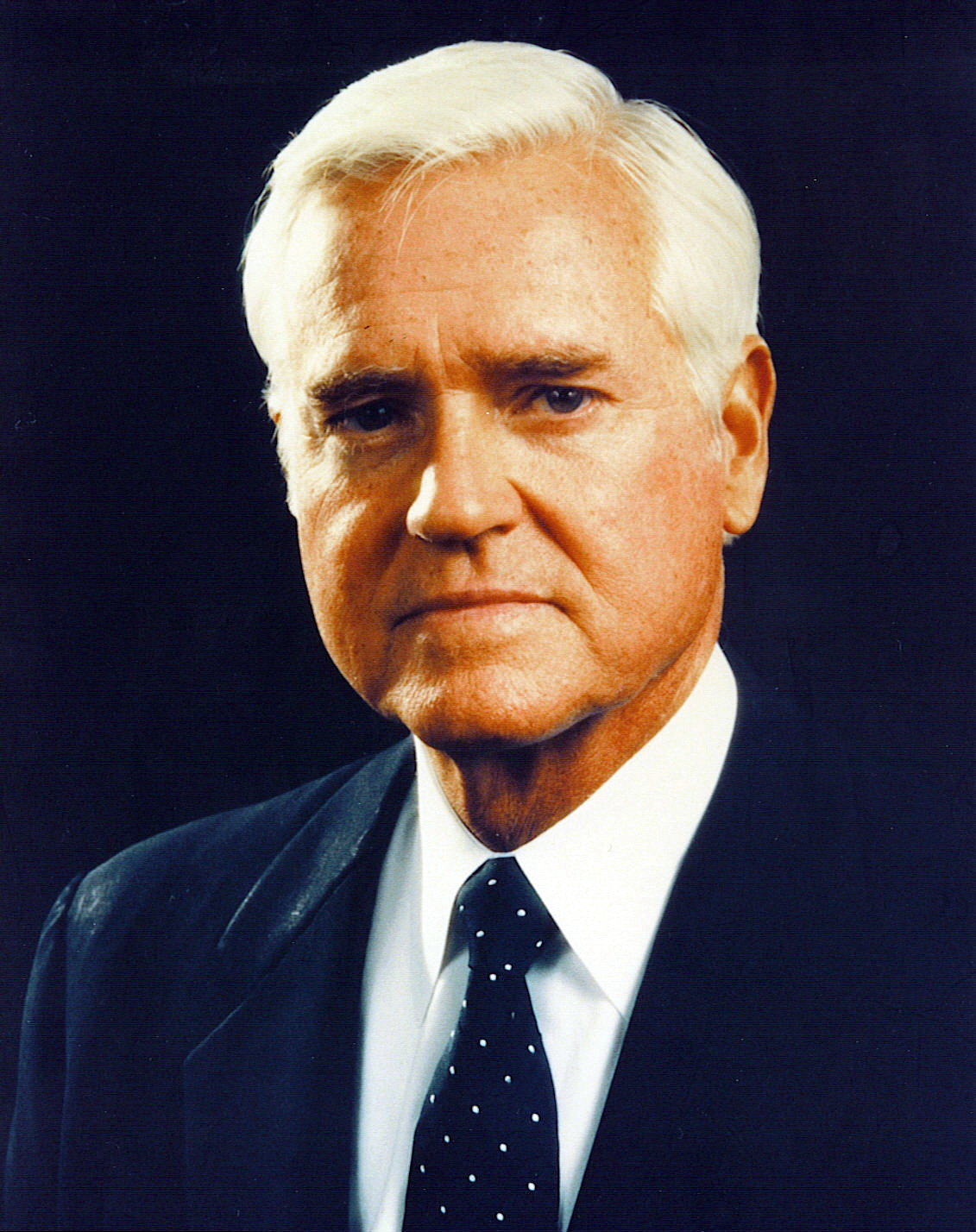

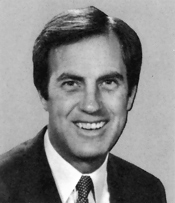
Nominee	Ernest Hollings	Thomas F. Hartnett
Party	Democratic	Republican
Popular vote	591,030	554,175
Percentage	50.07%	46.95%
- County results Hollings: 50–60% 60–70% 70–80% Hartnett: 50–60% 60–70%
U.S. senator before election
Ernest Hollings
Democratic
Elected U.S. Senator
Ernest Hollings
Democratic

Incumbent Democrat Fritz Hollings won re-election to his fifth full term, over Republican former Congressman Thomas Hartnett.

Republican primary
Party	Candidate	Votes	%
Republican	Thomas F. Hartnett	123,572	76.8%
Republican	Charlie E. Thompson	37,352	23.2%
Total votes		160,924	100.00%

The race between Hollings and Hartnett was between two politicians from the Lowcoutry. Hartnett attacked Hollings for co-sponsoring a bill in 1983 that would have outlawed discrimination against homosexuals and Hollings shot back about questions of Hartnett's integrity for pushing for military contracts with a firm he had ties with in North Charleston. The anti-incumbency mood helped to bring Hartnett close to topping Hollings in the general election, but South Carolina voters traditionally support their incumbent politicians and Hollings was elected for another six-year term, albeit with a much reduced margin.

South Carolina U.S. Senate Election, 1992
Party	Candidate	Votes	%	±%
Democratic	Fritz Hollings (Incumbent)	591,030	50.1%	−13.0%
Republican	Thomas F. Hartnett	554,175	46.9%	+11.3%
Libertarian	Mark Johnson	16,987	1.9%	+1.2%
American	Robert Barnwell Clarkson II	11,568	1.0%	+0.4%
No party	Write-Ins	703	0.1%	+0.1%
Majority		36,855	3.2%	−24.3%
Turnout		1,180,438	76.8%	+20.2%
Democratic hold		Swing		

== South Dakota ==
South Dakota election
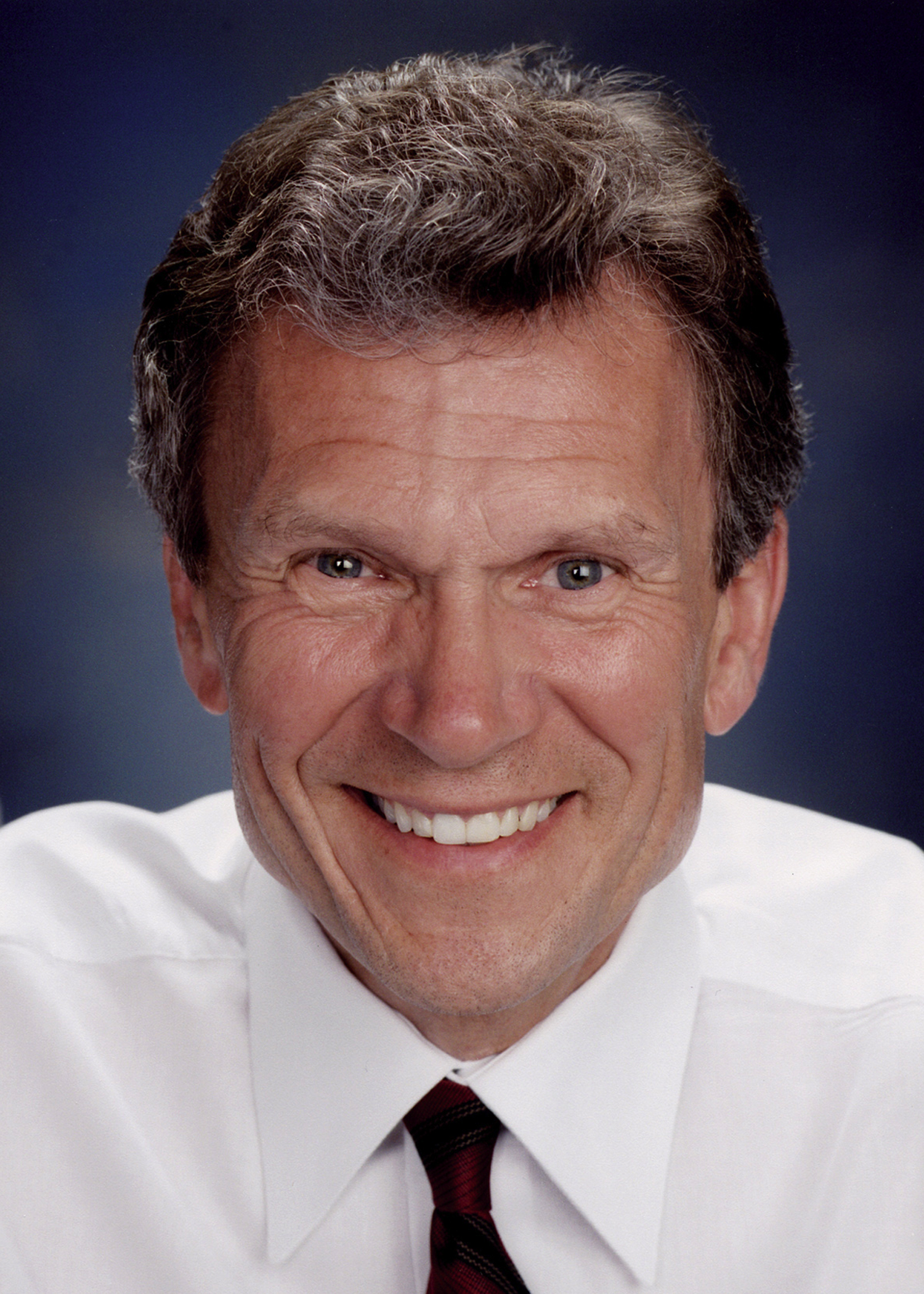
Nominee	Tom Daschle	Charlene Haar
Party	Democratic	Republican
Popular vote	217,095	108,733
Percentage	64.9%	32.5%
- County results Daschle: 40–50% 50–60% 60–70% 70–80% 80–90% Haar: 40–50%
U.S. senator before election
Tom Daschle
Democratic
Elected U.S. Senator
Tom Daschle
Democratic

Incumbent Democrat Tom Daschle won re-election to a second term, beating Republican educator Charlene Haar.

General election
Party	Candidate	Votes	%	±%
Democratic	Tom Daschle (Incumbent)	217,095	64.90%	+13.30%
Republican	Charlene Haar	108,733	32.51%	−15.89%
Libertarian	Gus Hercules	4,353	1.30%	
Independent	Kent Hyde	4,314	1.29%	
Majority		108,362	32.40%	+29.19%
Turnout		334,495		
Democratic hold		Swing		

== Utah ==
Utah election
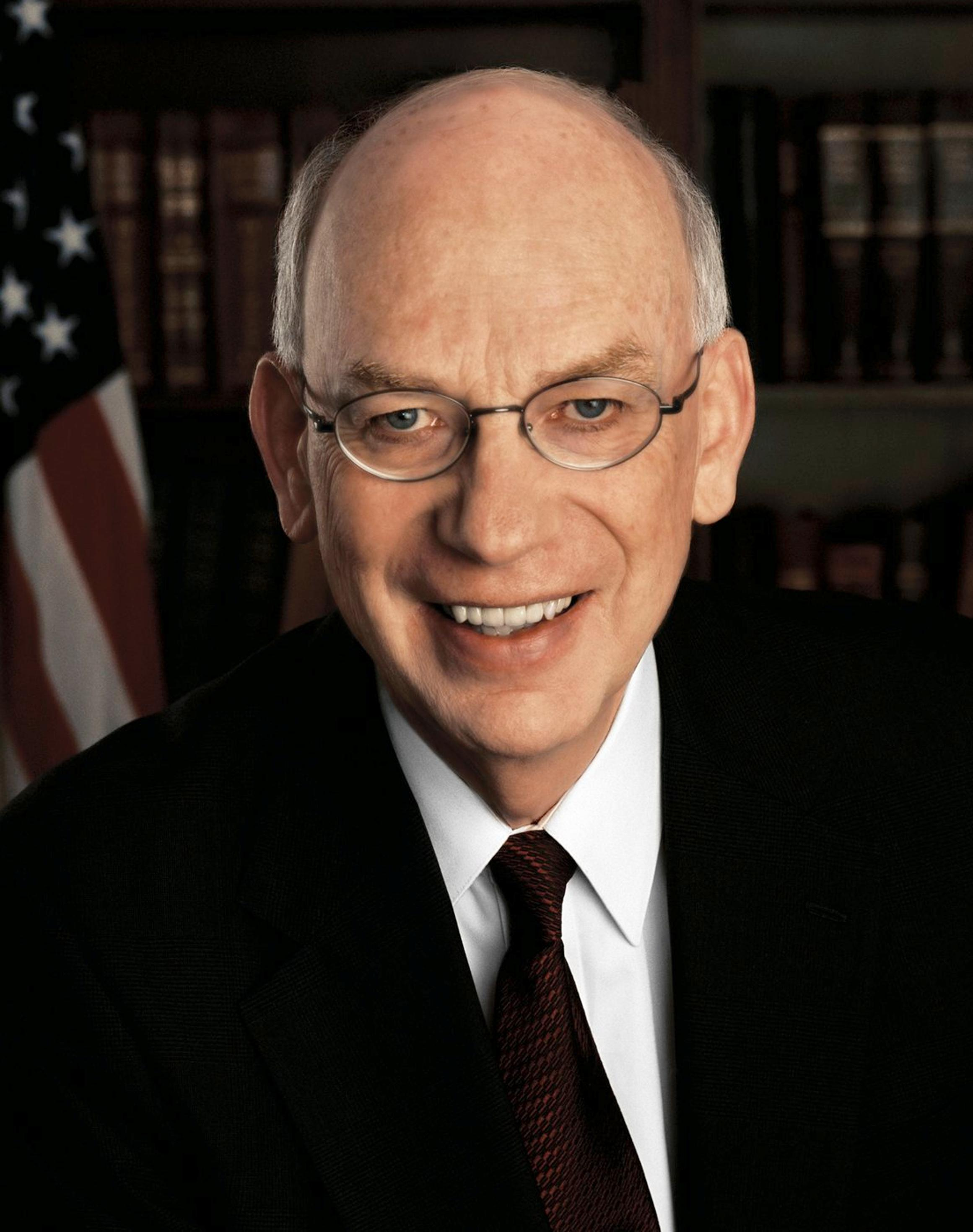

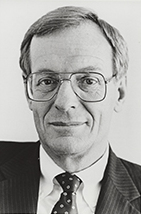
Nominee	Bob Bennett	Wayne Owens
Party	Republican	Democratic
Popular vote	420,069	301,228
Percentage	55.38%	39.72%
- County results Bennett: 40–50% 50–60% 60–70% 70–80% 80–90% Owens: 40–50% 50–60%
U.S. senator before election
Jake Garn
Republican
Elected U.S. Senator
Bob Bennett
Republican

Incumbent Republican Jake Garn decided to retire instead of seeking a fourth term. Republican Bob Bennett won the open seat over Democratic congressman Wayne Owens.

General election
Party	Candidate	Votes	%
Republican	Bob Bennett	420,069	55.38%
Democratic	Wayne Owens	301,228	39.72%
Populist	Anita Morrow	17,549	2.31%
Libertarian	Maury Modine	14,341	1.89%
Socialist Workers	Patricia Grogan	5,292	0.7%
Total votes		758,479	100.00%
Majority		118,841	15.66%
Republican hold			

== Vermont ==
Vermont election
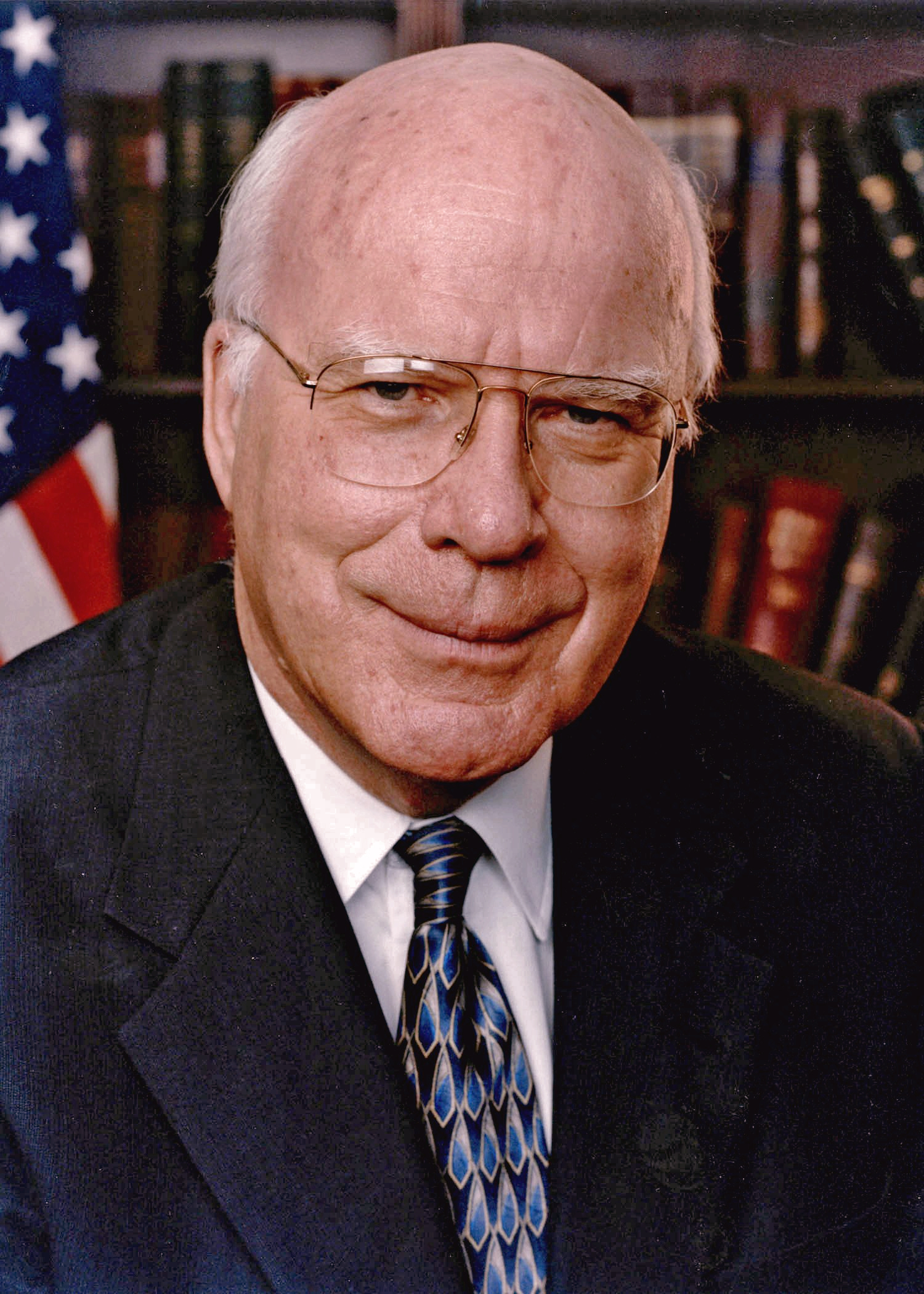

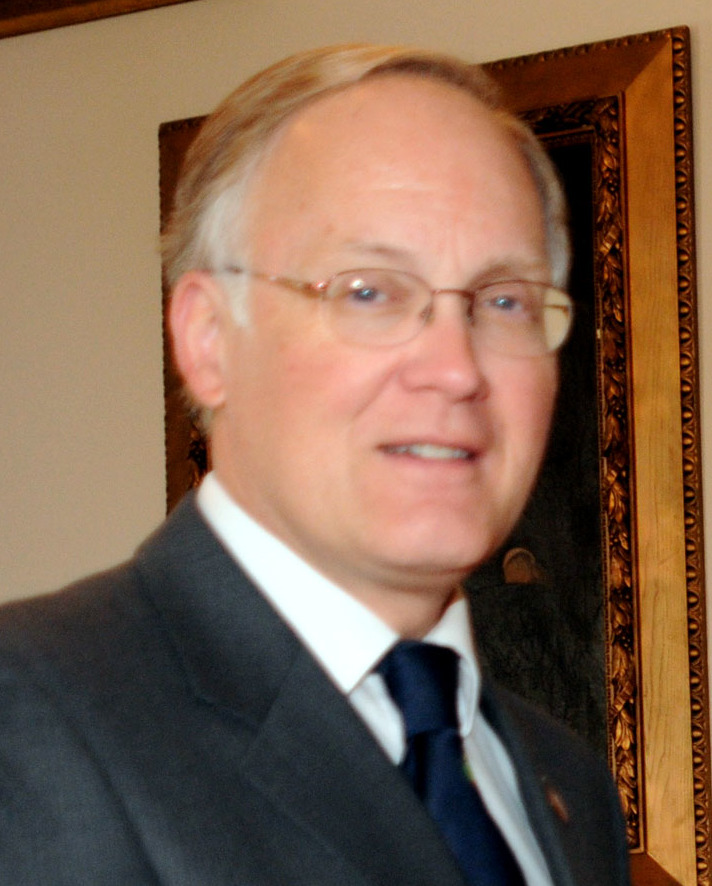
Nominee	Patrick Leahy	Jim Douglas
Party	Democratic	Republican
Popular vote	154,762	123,854
Percentage	54.2%	43.4%
- Leahy: 40-50% 50-60% 60-70% 70-80% Douglas: 40-50% 50-60% 60-70% 70-80%
U.S. senator before election
Patrick Leahy
Democratic
Elected U.S. Senator
Patrick Leahy
Democratic

Incumbent Democrat Patrick Leahy won re-election to a fourth term, beating Republican Secretary of State of Vermont Jim Douglas.

Democratic primary
Party	Candidate	Votes	%
Democratic	Patrick Leahy (Incumbent)	24,721	97.59%
Democratic	Write-ins	610	2.41%
Total votes		25,331	100.00%

Liberty Union primary
Party	Candidate	Votes	%
Liberty Union	Jerry Levy	311	91.20%
Liberty Union	Write-ins	30	8.80%
Total votes		341	100.00%

Republican primary
Party	Candidate	Votes	%
Republican	Jim Douglas	28,693	78.24%
Republican	John L. Gropper	7,395	20.16%
Republican	Write-ins	586	1.60%
Total votes		36,674	100.00%

General election
Party	Candidate	Votes	%	±%
Democratic	Patrick Leahy (Incumbent)	154,762	54.16%	−8.99%
Republican	Jim Douglas	123,854	43.35%	+8.85%
Liberty Union	Jerry Levy	5,121	1.79%	+0.99%
Freedom for LaRouche	Michael B. Godeck	1,780	0.62%	
Write-ins		222	0.08%	
Majority		30,908	10.82%	−17.84%
Turnout		285,739		
Democratic hold		Swing		

== Washington ==
Washington election
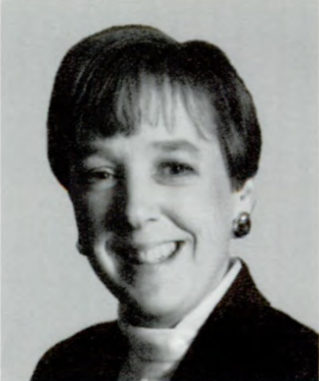

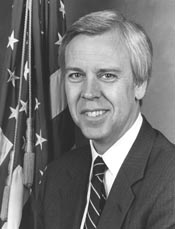
Nominee	Patty Murray	Rod Chandler
Party	Democratic	Republican
Popular vote	1,197,973	1,020,829
Percentage	54.0%	46.0%
- County results Murray: 50–60% 60–70% Chandler: 50–60% 60–70%
U.S. senator before election
Brock Adams
Democratic
Elected U.S. Senator
Patty Murray
Democratic

Serving one term, incumbent senator Brock Adams was strongly supportive of his party's leadership. In 1992 he chose not to be a candidate for re-election after eight women made statements to The Seattle Times alleging that Adams had committed various acts of sexual misconduct, ranging from sexual harassment to rape. Adams denied the allegations, but his popularity statewide was weakened considerably by the scandal and he chose to retire rather than risk losing the seat for his party. Chandler seemed to have the upper hand in one of the debates until for some unknown reason he quoted the Roger Miller song "Dang Me." He was further damaged by the unpopularity of President George H.W. Bush in the Pacific Northwest.

1992 United States Senate election in Washington
Party	Candidate	Votes	%
Democratic	Patty Murray	1,197,973	54.0%
Republican	Rod Chandler	1,020,829	46.0%
Majority		177,144	8.0%
Total votes		2,218,802	100.00%
Democratic hold			

== Wisconsin ==
Wisconsin election
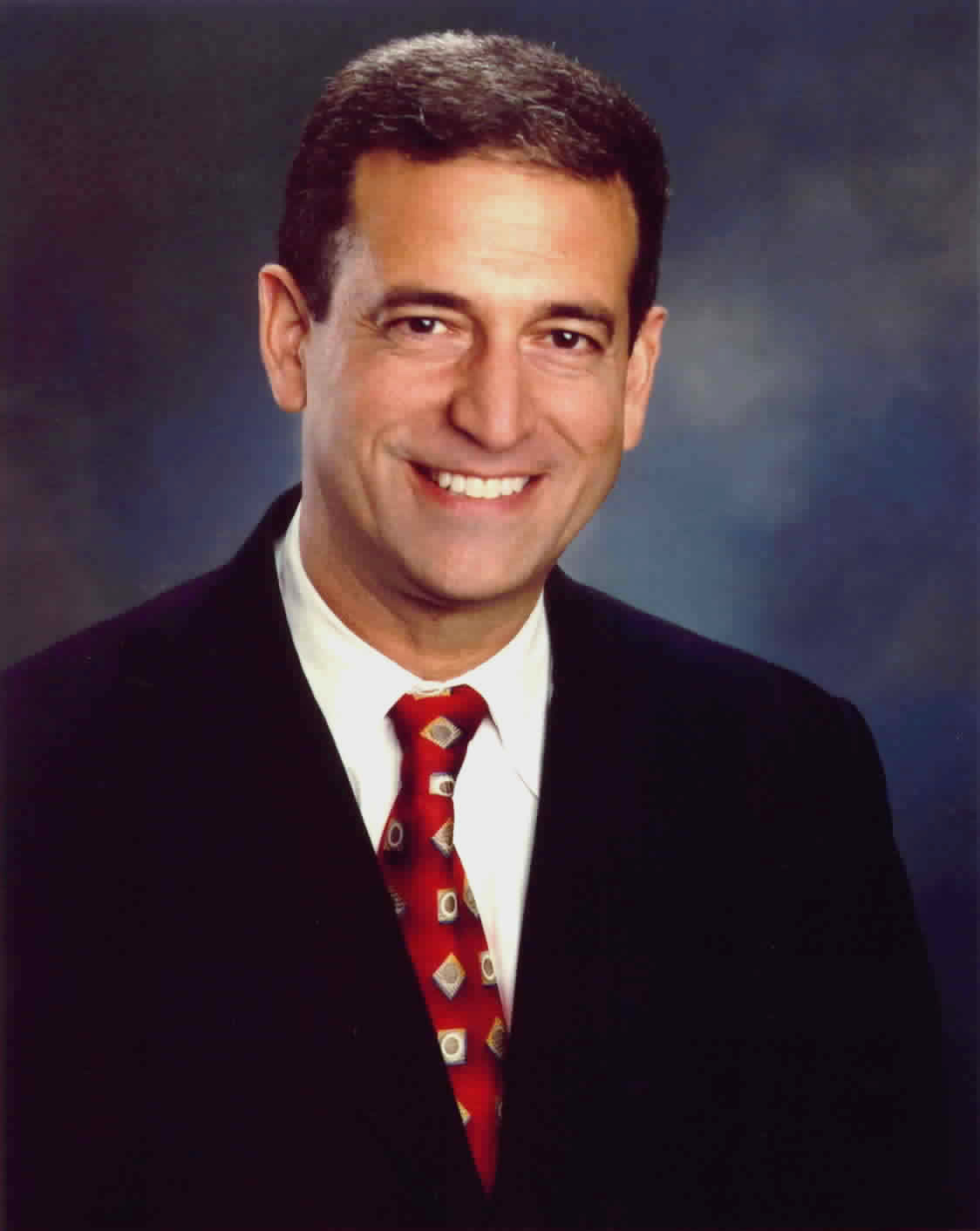

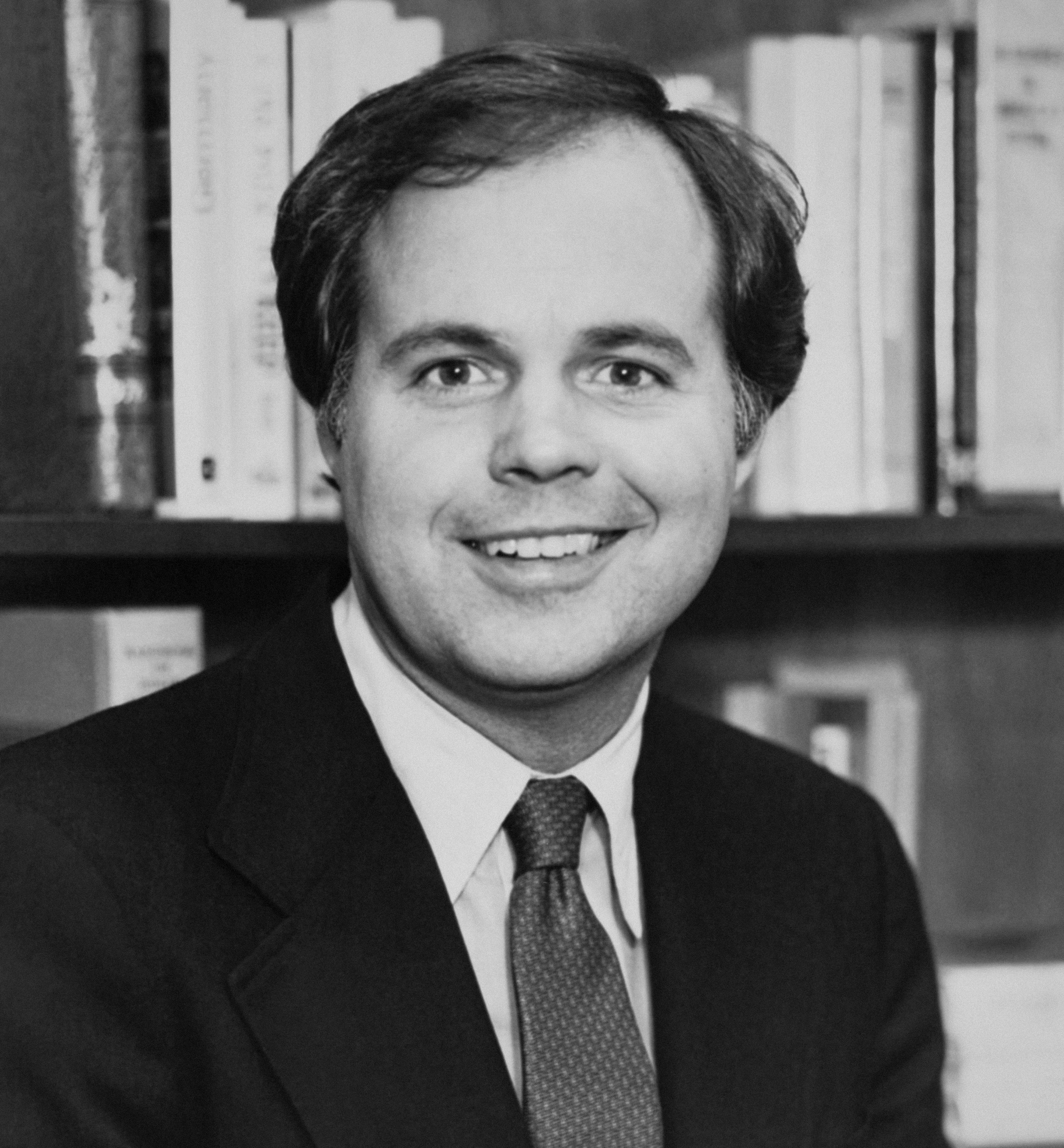
Nominee	Russ Feingold	Bob Kasten
Party	Democratic	Republican
Popular vote	1,290,662	1,129,599
Percentage	52.6%	46.0%
- County results Feingold: 50–60% 60–70% Kasten: 50–60% 60–70%
U.S. senator before election
Bob Kasten
Republican
Elected U.S. Senator
Russ Feingold
Democratic

Incumbent Republican Bob Kasten ran for re-election to a third term, but was defeated by Democratic State senator Russ Feingold.

Feingold, who had little name recognition in the state and was campaigning in a primary against a pair of millionaire opponents, U.S. Congressman Jim Moody and Milwaukee businessman Joe Checota, adopted several proposals to gain the electorate's attention. The most memorable of these was a series of five promises written on Feingold's garage door in the form of a contract. Also noted was Feingold's advertising campaign, which was widely compared to that used by progressive candidate Paul Wellstone in his victorious Senate campaign in Minnesota. Shot in the form of home movies, the ads attempted to portray Feingold, who always referred to himself as "the underdog running for U.S. senate," as a down-to-earth, Capra-esque figure, taking the audience on a guided tour of the candidate's home and introducing them to his children, all of whom were enrolled in public school.

The ads also contained a significant amount of humor. One featured Feingold meeting with an Elvis Presley impersonator, who offered Feingold his endorsement. (Bob Kasten responded to the Elvis endorsement with an advertisement featuring an Elvis impersonator attacking Feingold's record.) Another showed Feingold standing next to a pair of half-sized cardboard cut-outs of his opponents, refusing to "stoop to their level" as the two were shown literally slinging mud at one another.

During the primary campaign, Feingold unveiled an 82-point plan that aimed to eliminate the deficit by the end of his first term. The plan, which called for, among other things, a raise in taxes and cuts in the defense budget, was derided as "extremist" by Republicans and "too liberal" by his Democratic opponents. Feingold also announced his support for strict campaign finance reform and a national health care system and voiced his opposition to term limits and new tax cuts.

Feingold won by positioning himself as a quirky underdog who offered voters an alternative to what was seen by many as negative campaigning of opponents Jim Moody and Joe Checota. On primary day, Feingold, whose support had shown in the single digits throughout much of the campaign, surged to victory with 70 percent of the vote. Seven weeks later, while Bill Clinton, George H. W. Bush, and Ross Perot split the Wisconsin presidential vote 41%-37%-21%, Feingold beat Kasten by a margin of 53 percent to 46 percent.

General election results
Party	Candidate	Votes	%
Democratic	Russell Feingold	1,290,662	52.6%
Republican	Robert W. Kasten, Jr. (Incumbent)	1,129,599	46.0%
Independent	Patrick Johnson	16,513	0.7%
Libertarian	William Bittner	9,147	0.4%
Independent	Mervin A. Hanson, Sr.	3,264	0.1%
Grassroots	Robert L. Kundert	2,747	0.1%
Independent Populist	Joseph Selliken	2,733	0.1%
Total votes		2,454,665	100.00%
Majority		161,063	6.6%
Democratic gain from Republican			

== See also ==
- 1992 United States elections
  - 1992 United States gubernatorial elections
  - 1992 United States presidential election
  - 1992 United States House of Representatives elections
- 102nd United States Congress
- 103rd United States Congress
