= 1992 United States Senate election in Pennsylvania =

- November 3, 1992
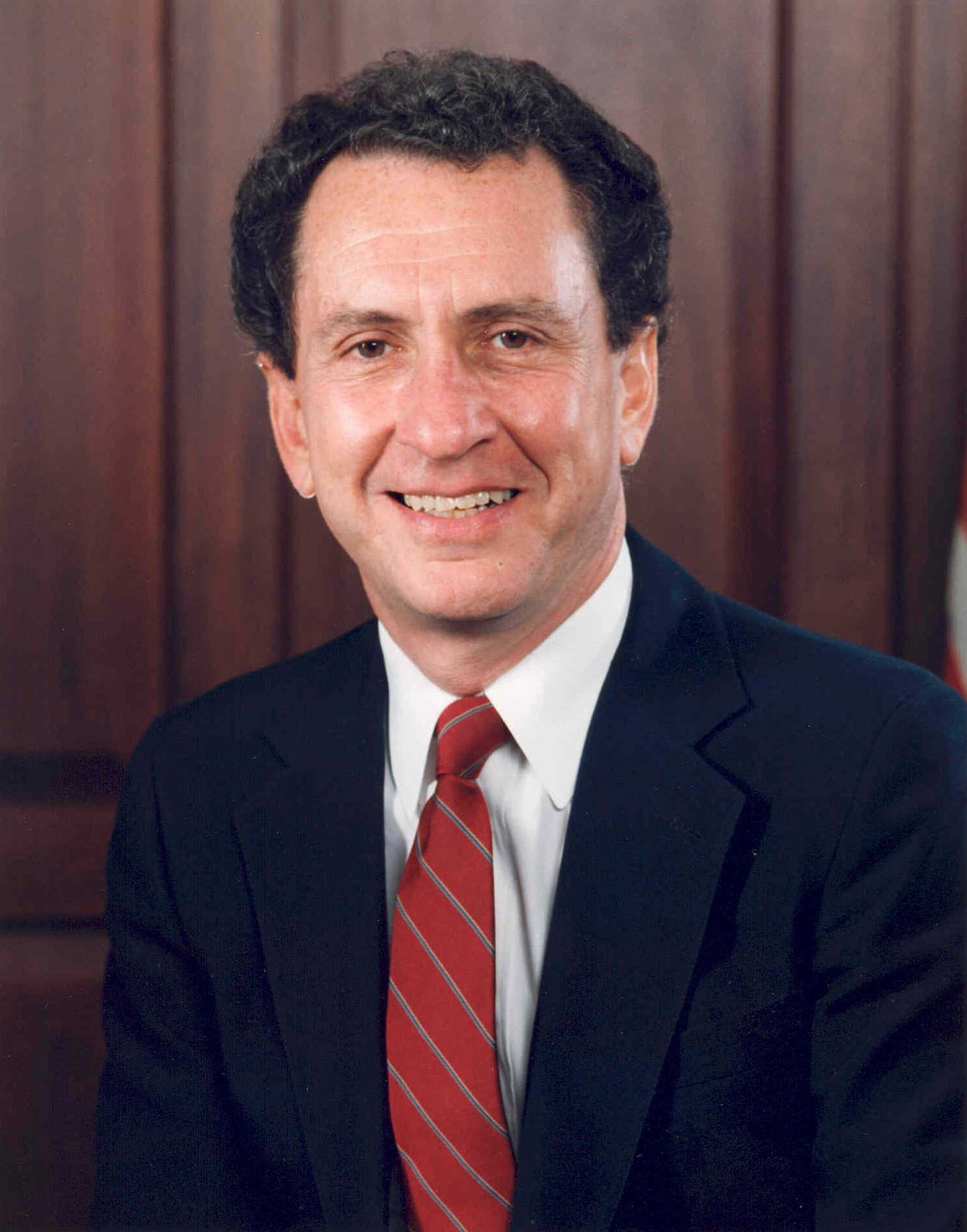

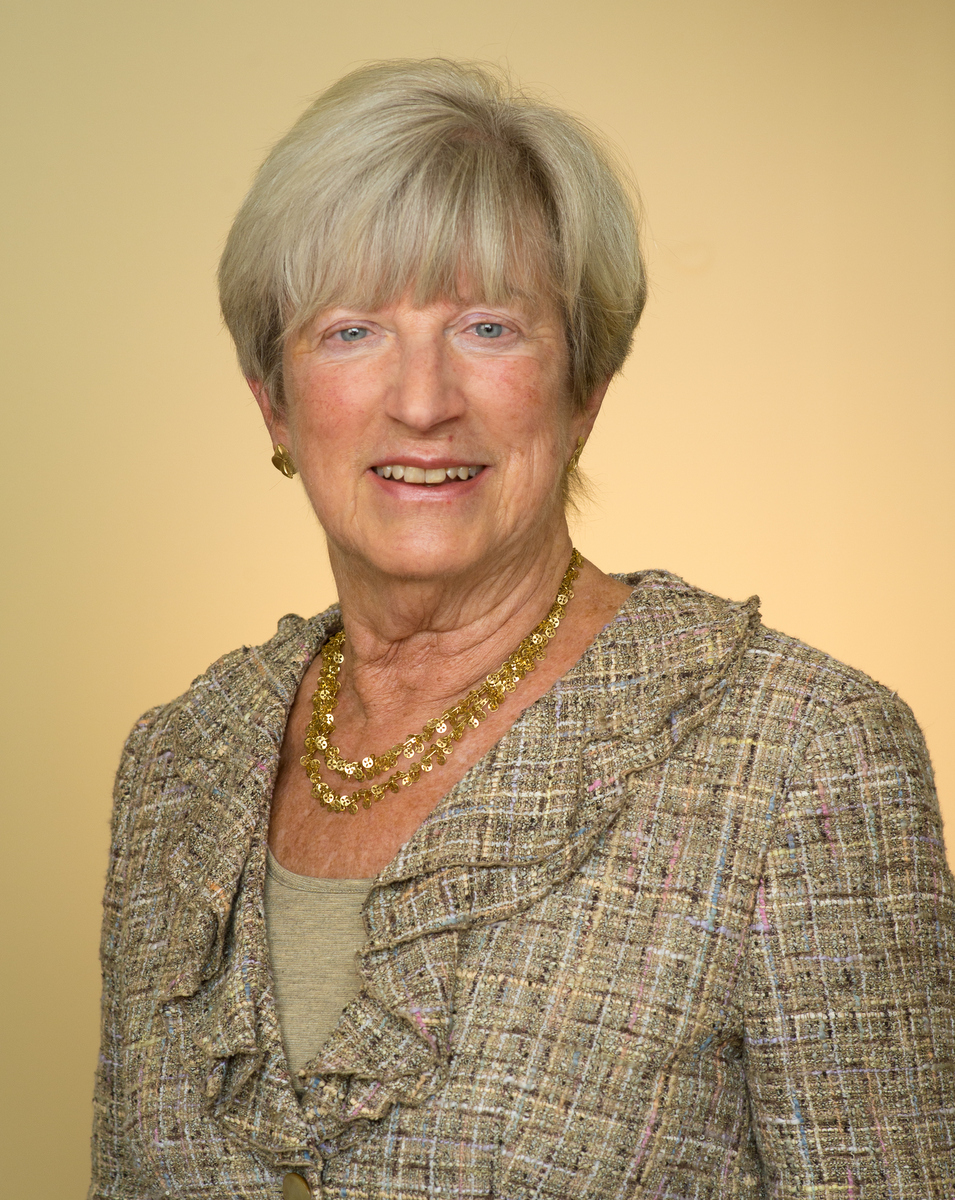
Nominee	Arlen Specter	Lynn Yeakel
Party	Republican	Democratic
Popular vote	2,358,125	2,224,966
Percentage	49.10%	46.33%
- Specter: 30–40% 40–50% 50–60% 60–70% 70–80% 80–90% >90% Yeakel: 30–40% 40–50% 50–60% 60–70% 70–80% 80–90% >90% Tie: 40–50% No data
U.S. senator before election
Arlen Specter
Republican
Elected U.S. Senator
Arlen Specter
Republican

The 1992 United States Senate election in Pennsylvania was held on November 3, 1992. Republican incumbent Arlen Specter narrowly won re-election to a third term, garnering just forty-nine percent of the vote against Democratic nominee Lynn Yeakel in what was described by The Philadelphia Inquirer as a "massive turnout for Bill Clinton."

Specter's campaign was widely reported by nationwide newspapers as having been harmed by his treatment of University of Oklahoma law professor Anita Hill during her testimony before the U.S. Senate Judiciary Committee in the Clarence Thomas confirmation process. His narrow victory was aided by a combination of support from Philadelphia-area voters and weak turnout for Yeakel in the Pittsburgh area.

== Republican primary ==
=== Candidates ===
- Stephen Freind, state representative from Delaware County
- Arlen Specter, incumbent U.S. senator since 1981

=== Campaign ===
Despite his powerful position in the Senate, Specter had numerous problems entering the election. A moderate who generally received only tepid support from his party's conservative wing, he was criticized by the right for opposing Ronald Reagan's nomination of Robert Bork to the Supreme Court. Specter subsequently faced a primary challenge from ultra-conservative State Representative Stephen Freind; although the incumbent won handily, the battle was expensive and featured many damaging attack ads.

== Democratic primary ==
=== Candidates ===
- Robert E. Colville, Allegheny County district attorney
- Freddy Mann Friedman
- Mark Singel, lieutenant governor of Pennsylvania
- Philip Valenti
- Lynn Yeakel, millionaire, director of women's studies at Drexel University College of Medicine, and daughter of former U.S. representative Porter Hardy Jr.

=== Results ===
Yeakel won the five-way primary with 45% of the vote, easily defeating the endorsed candidate, Mark Singel, in an election cycle dubbed by pundits as the "year of the woman".

== General election ==
=== Candidates ===
- John Perry (Libertarian)
- Arlen Specter, incumbent U.S. senator since 1981 (Republican)
- Lynn Yeakel, millionaire, director of women's studies at Drexel University College of Medicine, and daughter of former U.S. Representative Porter Hardy Jr. (Democratic)

=== Campaign ===
Senator Specter was highly targeted by women's groups for his involvement in the Clarence Thomas proceedings; during his questioning of Anita Hill, Specter appeared to show no sympathy for her allegations of sexual harassment. Furthermore, President Bush's popularity was rapidly declining in the state over high unemployment rates, and was subsequently dragging down Republican candidates.

Polls put Yeakel ahead of Specter by double digits, but Specter ran a campaign that was praised by political analysts for being almost flawless. Despite Yeakel's personal wealth, her inexperience in politics led to fundraising problems; Specter outspent her by a two-to-one margin. This kept Yeakel from running television ads until September 23, a month and a half before the election. The moderate Specter portrayed Yeakel, despite her liberal attitude, as a member of an elitist blue-blood family. He emphasized her father's votes against the Civil Rights Act of 1964 while in Congress, her affiliation with an all-white country club, and her church's minister's vocal criticism of the Israeli government. It did not help matters that a newspaper strike in Pittsburgh crippled Yeakel's ability to introduce herself to voters in the southwest.

Despite her mistakes, including a frequent tendency to mispronounce the names of places in which she was campaigning, Yeakel continued to perform solidly.

=== Results ===
1992 U.S. Senate election in Pennsylvania
Party	Candidate	Votes	%
Republican	Arlen Specter (incumbent)	2,358,125	49.10%
Democratic	Lynn Yeakel	2,224,966	46.33%
Libertarian	John Perry	219,319	4.57%
Total votes		4,822,410	100.00%
Majority		133,159	2.77%
Republican hold			

On Election Day, Yeakel captured by large numbers the traditional Democratic strongholds of the state, such as Pittsburgh, Scranton, and Erie; however, Specter undercut Yeakel's support in the state's most critical Democratic county: Philadelphia. Specter campaigned hard in black neighborhoods and received the endorsement of the NAACP. Furthermore, he capitalized on the ambivalence of many Philadelphia Democratic leaders to Yeakel. A self-described reform candidate, Yeakel distanced herself from the city's ward leaders. As a result, while Yeakel carried Philadelphia by a solid 122,000-vote margin, she significantly underperformed Bill Clinton's total there.

Also critical to the campaign was Specter's grass-roots involvement in Yeakel's base, the traditionally GOP, but Democratic-trending, suburbs of Philadelphia. Yeakel also significantly underperformed in the northeast and southwest. She barely won Lackawanna County, home to Scranton, and barely lost Allegheny County, home to Pittsburgh; as mentioned above, she easily carried the cities themselves.

== See also ==
- 1992 United States Senate elections
