= 1994 Pennsylvania gubernatorial election =

- November 8, 1994
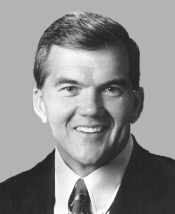

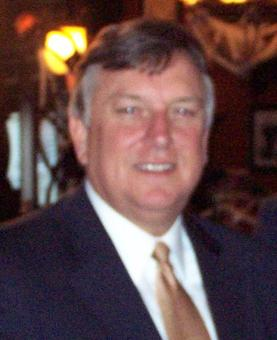

Nominee	Tom Ridge	Mark Singel	Peg Luksik
Party	Republican	Democratic	Constitution
Running mate	Mark Schweiker	Tom Foley	Jim Clymer
Popular vote	1,627,976	1,430,099	460,269
Percentage	45.40%	39.88%	12.84%
- Ridge: 30–40% 40–50% 50–60% 60–70% 70–80% 80–90% Singel: 30–40% 40–50% 50–60% 60–70% 70–80% 80–90% >90% Luksik: 30–40% 40–50% 50–60% Tie: 30–40% 40–50% 50–60% No data
Governor before election
Robert P. Casey
Democratic
Elected Governor
Tom Ridge
Republican

The 1994 Pennsylvania gubernatorial election was held on November 8, 1994. The incumbent governor, Bob Casey, Sr. (Democrat), was barred from seeking a third term by the state constitution. The Republican Party nominated Congressman Tom Ridge, while the Democrats nominated Mark Singel, Casey's lieutenant governor. Ridge went on to win the race with 45% of the vote. Singel finished with 39%, and Constitution Party candidate Peg Luksik finished third, garnering 12% of the vote.

== Democratic primary ==
=== Candidates ===
- Catherine Baker Knoll, Pennsylvania Treasurer (from Allegheny County)
- Dwight Evans, State Representative (from Philadelphia)
- Bob O'Donnell, State Representative and former Speaker of the House (from Philadelphia)
- Mark Singel, Lieutenant Governor (from Cambria County)
- Phillip Valenti, LaRouche activist (from Chester County)
- Chuck Volpe, insurance executive (from Allegheny County)
- Lynn Yeakel, philanthropist and 1992 nominee for U.S. Senate (from Montgomery County)

=== Campaign ===
Lt. Governor Singel was a well-known figure in the state and was a clear early frontrunner after serving six months as acting governor as Bob Casey underwent cancer treatments. However, his 1992 defeat by Lynn Yeakel in the 1992 Democratic primary for senate left the party feeling that Singel was vulnerable in a statewide election. Treasurer Catherine Baker Knoll, who was popular with older voters and siphoned the support of some labor groups from Singel, was viewed as his biggest threat, but state representative Dwight Evans, who mobilized urban minority voters, finished a somewhat surprising second. Former state Speaker of the House Bob O'Donnell and Yeakel, who was criticized for campaigning poorly in the close 1992 senate race, both saw their campaigns fail to get traction.

=== Results ===
Democratic primary results Singel: 20%–30%; 30%–40%; 40%–50%; 50%–60%; 60%–70%; Evans: 30%–40%; 50%–60%; Knoll: 30%–40%; 40%–50%; Yeakel: 20%–30%; 30%–40%

Pennsylvania gubernatorial Democratic primary, 1994
Party	Candidate	Votes	%
Democratic	Mark Singel	346,344	31.19
Democratic	Dwight Evans	234,285	21.10
Democratic	Catherine Baker Knoll	217,267	19.57
Democratic	Lynn Yeakel	153,966	13.87
Democratic	Chuck Volpe	122,627	11.04
Democratic	Bob O'Donnell	23,113	2.08
Democratic	Phillip Valenti	12,854	1.16
Total votes		1,110,446	100.00

== Republican primary ==
=== Candidates ===
- Sam Katz, political consultant (from Philadelphia)
- Mike Fisher, state senator and 1986 lieutenant governor nominee (from Allegheny County)
- Jack Perry
- Ernie Preate, Pennsylvania Attorney General (from Lackawanna County)
- Tom Ridge, U.S. Representative from Erie (from Erie County)

=== Campaign ===
Attorney General Ernie Preate, who was known for both being a tough prosecutor and working to reform the mental health system, was seen as the initial frontrunner, but his attempt was marred by a corruption controversy. Mike Fisher, a state senator and former candidate for lieutenant governor, sought to take advantage of Preate's missteps but was unable gain a majority of establishment support. Tom Ridge, who Republicans had initially tried to court to run in the 1990 election, slowly built name recognition and gained political backing due to his relatively moderate track record.

=== Results ===
Republican primary results Ridge: 20%–30%; 30%–40%; 40%–50%; 50%–60%; 60%–70%; 70%–80%; Preate: 20%–30%; 30%–40%; 40%–50%; 50%–60%; 70%–80%; Katz: 30%–40%; Fisher: 20%–30%; 30%–40%; 40%–50%

Pennsylvania gubernatorial primary (Republican), 1994
Party	Candidate	Votes	%
Republican	Tom Ridge	344,708	34.58
Republican	Ernie Preate	287,400	28.83
Republican	Sam Katz	156,895	15.74
Republican	Mike Fisher	139,712	14.02
Republican	Jack Perry	68,069	6.83
Total votes		996,784	100.00

== General election ==
=== Candidates ===
- Patrick Fallon (Libertarian)
  - Vince Hatton
- Tom Holloway (Reform)
  - Mark Freeman
- Peg Luksik, director of an anti-abortion organization (Constitution)
  - running mate: Jim Clymer, attorney
- Mark Singel, Lt. Governor (Democratic)
  - running mate: Tom Foley, Pennsylvania Secretary of Labor and Industry
- Tom Ridge, U.S. Representative from Erie (Republican)
  - running mate: Mark Schweiker, Bucks County Commissioner

=== Campaign ===
Prior to the election, Singel appeared to be a candidate who would be difficult to beat; he had gained wide name recognition and a positive job appraisal for his service as acting governor during Bob Casey's battle with serious illness. In contrast, Ridge had been a relatively obscure Congressman who was mostly unknown outside of his Erie base. Ridge proved to be a successful fundraiser and undercut support from Democrats in the socially liberal but fiscally conservative suburbs of Philadelphia and Pittsburgh.

Abortion became a key issue in the campaign. Peg Luksik ran a strong third party campaign in opposition to the Republican nominations of the pro-choice Ridge and Barbara Hafer in their most recent two gubernatorial campaigns. Singel, who is also pro-choice, gained only lukewarm support from his former boss Casey, a vocal critic of abortion policy.

The tide began to turn against Singel after the revelation that he had voted to parole an individual named Reginald McFadden, who would later be charged for a series of murders in New York City. Ridge, whose campaign emphasized his "tough on crime" stance, took advantage of this situation, much in the manner that George H. W. Bush had used the Willie Horton incident against Michael Dukakis. Singel was further undercut by a lack of Democratic enthusiasm; turnout was particularly low in strongholds such as Philadelphia, Pittsburgh, and Scranton.

=== Polling ===
Source	Date	Ridge (R)	Singel (D)	Luksik (C)
Greensburg Tribune-Review	Nov. 7, 1994	37%	36%	17%
KDKA-TV	Nov. 6, 1994	42%	39%	6%
Philadelphia Daily News	Nov. 2, 1994	38%	30%	10%
Greensburg Tribune-Review	Oct. 30, 1994	33%	31%	9%
KDKA-TV	Oct. 23, 1994	39%	40%	5%
Pittsburgh Post-Gazette	Oct. 16, 1994	31%	38%	7%
Political Media Research	Oct. 2, 1994	37%	43%	-

=== Results ===
1994 Pennsylvania gubernatorial election
Party	Candidate	Votes	%
Republican	Tom Ridge	1,627,976	45.40%
Democratic	Mark Singel	1,430,099	39.88%
Constitution	Peg Luksik	460,269	12.84%
Libertarian	Patrick Fallon	33,602	0.94%
Reform	Tom Holloway	33,235	0.93%
Write-in		345	0.01%
Total votes		3,585,526	100.00%
Turnout			60.98%
Republican gain from Democratic			

==== Results by county ====
County	Tom Ridge Republican		Mark Singel Democratic		Peg Luksik Constitution		Various Candidates Other parties		Margin		Total votes cast
County	#	%	#	%	#	%	#	%	#	%	Total votes cast
Adams	12,146	52.99%	6,977	30.44%	3,428	14.96%	370	1.61%	5,169	22.55%	22,921
Allegheny	180,260	40.33%	193,459	43.28%	68,141	15.25%	5,093	1.14%	-13,199	-2.95%	446,953
Armstrong	8,821	40.52%	7,944	36.49%	4,742	21.78%	265	1.22%	877	4.03%	21,772
Beaver	20,201	33.74%	26,965	45.04%	11,704	19.55%	999	1.67%	-6,764	-11.30%	59,869
Bedford	8,689	55.94%	4,588	29.54%	2,027	13.05%	228	1.47%	4,101	26.40%	15,532
Berks	48,857	52.91%	30,740	33.29%	9,863	10.68%	2,878	3.12%	18,117	19.62%	92,338
Blair	17,734	51.54%	9,830	28.57%	6,136	17.83%	710	2.06%	7,904	22.97%	34,410
Bradford	10,538	63.21%	4,700	28.19%	950	5.70%	484	2.90%	5,838	35.02%	16,672
Bucks	87,327	52.51%	55,180	33.18%	18,256	10.98%	5,539	3.33%	32,147	19.33%	166,302
Butler	21,746	44.68%	13,514	27.76%	12,684	26.06%	730	1.50%	8,232	16.92%	48,674
Cambria	13,944	25.63%	31,043	57.05%	8,764	16.11%	663	1.22%	-17,099	-31.42%	54,414
Cameron	748	37.08%	550	27.27%	706	35.00%	13	0.64%	42	2.08% (Note: Compares margin over Luksik.)	2,017
Carbon	7,533	48.45%	6,626	42.61%	1,087	6.99%	303	1.95%	907	5.84%	15,549
Centre	17,087	49.84%	12,569	36.66%	4,022	11.73%	607	1.77%	4,518	13.18%	34,285
Chester	61,890	53.10%	34,652	29.73%	17,334	14.87%	2,685	2.30%	27,238	23.37%	116,561
Clarion	6,724	53.05%	4,029	31.79%	1,721	13.58%	200	1.58%	2,695	21.26%	12,674
Clearfield	11,713	48.32%	8,432	34.78%	3,673	15.15%	424	1.75%	3,281	13.54%	24,242
Clinton	4,895	49.82%	4,084	41.56%	711	7.24%	136	1.38%	811	8.26%	9,826
Columbia	8,274	50.17%	5,980	36.26%	1,350	8.19%	889	5.39%	2,294	13.91%	16,493
Crawford	19,508	69.52%	5,689	20.27%	2,617	9.33%	247	0.88%	13,819	49.25%	28,061
Cumberland	32,903	50.40%	19,003	29.11%	12,161	18.63%	1,220	1.87%	13,900	21.29%	65,287
Dauphin	34,689	44.63%	27,844	35.82%	13,864	17.84%	1,337	1.72%	6,845	8.81%	77,734
Delaware	91,589	49.56%	64,065	34.67%	25,484	13.79%	3,672	1.99%	27,524	14.89%	184,810
Elk	4,784	43.31%	3,229	29.23%	2,961	26.81%	72	0.65%	1,555	14.08%	11,046
Erie	65,181	67.34%	21,422	22.13%	9,591	9.91%	598	0.62%	43,759	45.21%	96,792
Fayette	12,710	31.76%	22,497	56.21%	4,075	10.18%	741	1.85%	-9,787	-24.45%	40,023
Forest	1,197	63.07%	480	25.29%	161	8.48%	60	3.16%	717	37.78%	1,898
Franklin	20,001	60.08%	10,016	30.09%	2,877	8.64%	394	1.18%	9,985	29.99%	33,288
Fulton	2,319	58.03%	1,316	32.93%	295	7.38%	66	1.65%	1,003	25.10%	3,996
Greene	4,314	36.92%	6,167	52.77%	1,047	8.96%	158	1.35%	-1,853	-15.85%	11,686
Huntingdon	6,530	51.81%	3,636	28.85%	1,570	12.46%	867	6.88%	2,894	22.96%	12,603
Indiana	11,087	43.99%	10,368	41.13%	3,263	12.95%	488	1.94%	719	2.86%	25,206
Jefferson	7,151	52.93%	4,063	30.07%	2,102	15.56%	195	1.44%	3,088	22.86%	13,511
Juniata	3,548	51.90%	2,133	31.20%	916	13.40%	239	3.50%	1,415	20.70%	6,836
Lackawanna	26,053	37.00%	36,014	51.15%	7,367	10.46%	976	1.39%	-9,961	-14.15%	70,410
Lancaster	66,295	54.75%	27,376	22.61%	25,624	21.16%	1,791	1.48%	38,919	32.14%	121,086
Lawrence	13,102	42.83%	13,355	43.66%	3,839	12.55%	296	0.97%	-253	-0.83%	30,592
Lebanon	16,780	51.53%	9,320	28.62%	5,299	16.27%	1,163	3.57%	7,460	22.91%	32,562
Lehigh	41,767	53.82%	27,970	36.04%	5,667	7.30%	2,196	2.83%	13,797	17.78%	77,600
Luzerne	38,233	41.29%	43,786	47.28%	9,519	10.28%	1,068	1.15%	-5,553	-5.99%	92,606
Lycoming	19,334	60.42%	9,134	28.55%	3,068	9.59%	462	1.44%	10,200	31.87%	31,998
McKean	6,359	54.67%	2,925	25.15%	2,133	18.34%	215	1.85%	3,434	29.52%	11,632
Mercer	19,617	55.33%	12,294	34.67%	3,229	9.11%	317	0.89%	7,323	20.66%	35,457
Mifflin	6,140	53.47%	4,068	35.42%	1,061	9.24%	215	1.87%	2,072	18.05%	11,484
Monroe	14,409	54.09%	10,137	38.05%	1,425	5.35%	668	2.51%	4,272	16.04%	26,639
Montgomery	110,319	48.14%	85,077	37.13%	28,108	12.27%	5,646	2.46%	25,242	11.01%	229,150
Montour	2,809	55.68%	1,640	32.51%	459	9.10%	137	2.72%	1,169	23.17%	5,405
Northampton	33,704	50.47%	26,641	39.90%	3,966	5.94%	2,466	3.69%	7,063	10.57%	66,777
Northumberland	12,785	46.35%	10,633	38.55%	3,382	12.26%	783	2.84%	2,152	7.80%	27,583
Perry	5,522	44.82%	3,094	25.11%	3,411	27.69%	293	2.38%	2,111	19.71%	12,320
Philadelphia	100,592	24.87%	270,380	66.86%	27,528	6.81%	5,897	1.46%	-169,788	-41.99%	404,397
Pike	5,583	62.34%	2,907	32.46%	360	4.02%	106	1.18%	2,676	29.88%	8,956
Potter	3,434	64.07%	1,377	25.69%	466	8.69%	83	1.55%	2,057	38.38%	5,360
Schuylkill	24,714	49.25%	19,148	38.16%	5,254	10.47%	1,064	2.12%	5,566	11.09%	50,180
Snyder	6,007	62.80%	2,332	24.38%	812	8.49%	415	4.34%	3,675	38.42%	9,566
Somerset	11,724	43.56%	11,383	42.29%	3,524	13.09%	284	1.06%	341	1.27%	26,915
Sullivan	1,480	60.11%	787	31.97%	151	6.13%	44	1.79%	693	28.14%	2,462
Susquehanna	7,499	58.39%	3,973	30.93%	1,041	8.10%	331	2.58%	3,526	27.46%	12,844
Tioga	7,939	65.89%	3,417	28.36%	551	4.57%	142	1.18%	4,522	37.53%	12,049
Union	5,539	60.89%	2,445	26.88%	808	8.88%	305	3.35%	3,094	34.01%	9,097
Venango	10,682	61.60%	4,796	27.66%	1,620	9.34%	244	1.41%	5,886	33.94%	17,342
Warren	9,194	62.46%	3,643	24.75%	1,652	11.22%	231	1.57%	5,551	37.71%	14,720
Washington	25,852	39.21%	30,856	46.80%	8,327	12.63%	897	1.36%	-5,004	-7.59%	65,932
Wayne	7,430	60.38%	3,862	31.38%	815	6.62%	199	1.62%	3,568	29.00%	12,306
Westmoreland	46,089	38.92%	48,045	40.58%	21,586	18.23%	2,688	2.27%	-1,956	-1.66%	118,408
Wyoming	5,074	59.56%	2,481	29.12%	807	9.47%	157	1.84%	2,593	30.44%	8,519
York	49,278	49.65%	31,013	31.25%	17,127	17.26%	1,833	1.85%	18,265	18.40%	99,251
Totals	1,627,976	45.40%	1,430,099	39.89%	460,269	12.84%	67,182	1.87%	197,877	5.51%	3,585,526

==== Counties that flipped from Democratic to Republican ====
- Adams
- Armstrong
- Schuylkill
- Bucks
- Berks
- Bedford
- Blair
- Bradford
- Butler
- Cameron
- Chester
- Centre
- Clarion
- Columbia
- Crawford
- Delaware
- Cumberland
- Dauphin
- Forest
- Franklin
- Fulton
- Huntingdon
- Jefferson
- Juniata
- Indiana
- Lancaster
- Lehigh
- Mifflin
- Montour
- Somerset
- Sullivan
- York
- Clinton
- Clearfield
- Mercer
- Lycoming
- McKean
- Monroe
- Northumberland
- Perry
- Pike
- Potter
- Susquehanna
- Tioga
- Venango
- Wyoming
- Warren
- Carbon
- Elk
- Erie
- Northampton
- Lebanon
- Snyder
- Union
- Wayne
