= Reginald McFadden =

American serial killer (1953–2023)

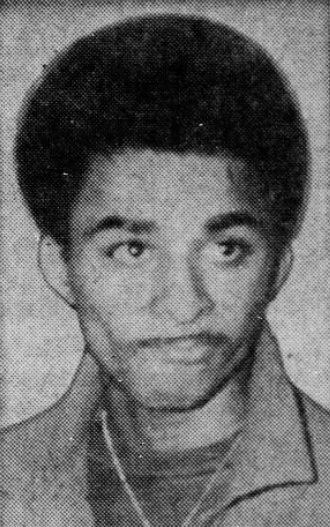
- 1969 portrait
- Born: February 23, 1953; Philadelphia, Pennsylvania, U.S.
- Died: March 6, 2023 (aged 70); Wende Correctional Facility, Alden, New York, U.S.
- Convictions: Pennsylvania; First degree murder Aggravated robbery Burglary; Larceny; Criminal conspiracy New York; Second degree murder (2 counts); First degree rape (3 counts); First degree aggravated sexual abuse Second degree kidnapping Second degree assault First degree robbery First degree burglary Fourth degree grand larceny
- Penalty: Pennsylvania; Life imprisonment without parole; commuted to 24 years to life New York; 89 years and 10 months to life

Details
- Victims: 3–4+
- Span of crimes: 1969–1994
- Country: United States
- States: Pennsylvania, New York
- Date apprehended: For the final time on October 6, 1994

Reginald McFadden (February 23, 1953 – March 6, 2023) was an American serial killer who committed a series of rapes and two murders in Rockland and Nassau counties, New York in 1994, which started only 92 days after his parole from a rape-murder committed as a juvenile in Pennsylvania. Sentenced to life imprisonment for the latter crimes, his case brought on changes to the parole system and clemency applications for juvenile offenders in the state of Pennsylvania, as well as similar reforms in New York.

== Early life ==
Reginald McFadden was born on February 23, 1953, in Philadelphia, Pennsylvania, one of ten children in a family that had financial difficulties. His father abandoned the family a few years later, after which McFadden's mother began cohabiting with a man named James Woods. Woods was physically abusive and would beat the various children with an electric cable when they misbehaved - due to this, McFadden did not form close relationships with his relatives and spent most of his time at this grandmother's house, who cared for him.

In the early 1960s, McFadden lost interest in learning and dropped out of school, whereupon he started spending most of his time on the streets. Together with his older brothers Gordon and Victor, he joined a teenage street gang and started committing crimes. From the early 1960s through December 1969, McFadden and his brothers were arrested by authorities a total of 17 times for various offenses. In November 1969, McFadden was arrested in New York City on a charge of car theft and taken to the county jail, but his bail was paid by his mother, who then brought him back to Philadelphia.

== Murder of Sonia Rosenbaum ==
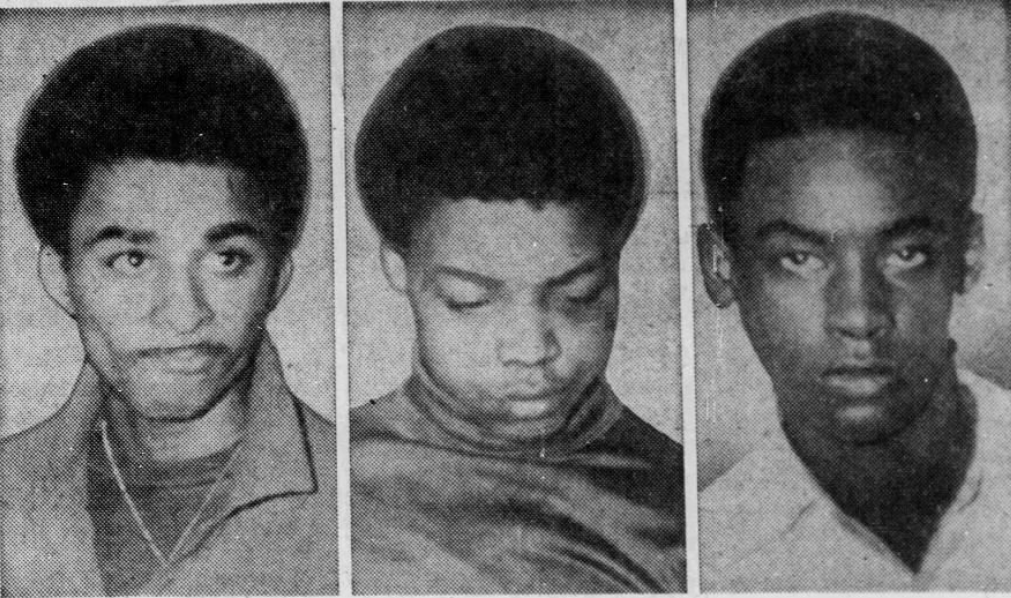
Three of the four perpetrators after their arrest (from left to right): Reginald McFadden, Robert Forbes and William Jones

On the night of December 7, 1969, the 16-year-old McFadden, along with three other teenagers (15-year-old William Jones; 13-year-old Robert Forbes and 17-year-old Curtis Woods), broke into the Wynnefield apartment of 66-year-old Sonia Rosenbaum. Once inside, the criminals tied her up and began threatening to physically harm her, after which she indicated to them where she was hiding a stash of money and jewelry. McFadden and his accomplices put a washcloth in Rosenbaum's mouth and restrained her with adhesive tape and cords from her blinds, leaving her naked on the bed beneath a blanket. Rosenbaum would later suffocate and die. They then stole $20 from the apartment and fled in the victim's automobile.

Not long after, the accomplices were arrested and confessed to the crime, leading to McFadden's arrest. While searching their homes, officers found jewelry and a number of other valuables that were identified as belonging to Rosenbaum by her relatives. In the early morning hours of December 11, 1969, police went to the McFadden family household, where they caught the teenager attempting to escape through a bedroom window with the help of his mother. A subsequent search of the house led to the discovery of more than $600, which neither McFadden nor his mother could explain the origin of. He was then charged with first-degree murder, burglary, aggravated robbery, larceny and conspiracy.

=== Incarceration ===
In 1970, McFadden and two of his accomplices were found guilty of all charges and sentenced to life imprisonment without parole. As a juvenile, he was physically assaulted by other inmates and got into numerous scuffles from 1970 to 1984. In 1974, he was granted a retrial based on allegations that the officers had practically forced him into confessing and it should not have been used at his subsequent trial. At his second trial, McFadden was convicted yet again and again sentenced to life imprisonment without parole, this time with Jones agreeing to testify against him.

In order to avoid conflict, McFadden taught himself self-defense, began reading a religious newspaper regularly, corresponded with members of the Nation of Islam, and reflected on his spiritual life. In the late 1970s, McFadden, under the influence of his spiritual advisors, converted to Islam and began participating in various rehabilitation programs.

=== Appeals ===
In 1977, McFadden's attorneys drafted an appellate document and appealed against his sentence, arguing that his arrest was in violation of the law. The appellate court found procedural errors, but found them to be insignificant to the final verdict, due to which the appeal was dismissed. In the early 1980s, McFadden received his high school diploma and graduated from a college with degrees in psychology, tree surgery, and haircutting. From 1984 onward, McFadden began filing clemency petitions to the Governor of Pennsylvania.

In 1992, he filed his 8th petition for clemency, which was finally granted. By this time, McFadden had not been disciplined for nearly eight years, helping the guards in the 1989 riots at SCI Camp Hill, had successfully completed numerous juvenile rehabilitation programs and earned positive testimonials from psychologists and staff at all seven prisons where he had served his sentence. In addition, five volunteers from various movements for rehabilitation of inmates pledged to provide him with housing and employment in New York if he were to be released. As a result, on August 27, 1992, the five-member parole board voted by a majority to commute McFadden's sentence and then forwarded their decision to Governor Bob Casey Sr., who did not sign it until the summer of 1994.

== Release ==
On July 7, 1994, McFadden was released, left Pennsylvania and moved to New York, where members of an Islamic organization named "Irfan" provided him with a job and placed him in a halfway house in Nyack. McFadden worked at a bookstore called "Pak Books" in Manhattan, owned by a man named Charles Campbell. A few weeks after his release, there was a conflict between Campbell and McFadden after the latter started moving copies of the Quran to higher shelves. Due to mounting pressure and abuse from co-workers, McFadden quit and sought help from the volunteer organization, but by then, they had cut all contact with him.

In late August, McFadden moved to Madison, New Jersey, where he found employment as a clerk in a grocery store. In September of that year, however, he quit after he complained that the store did not comply with Muslim dietary standards as advertised. In the final days of that month, he took a job as a guidance counselor at Edwin Gould Academy in Chestnut Ridge, New York, which was a boarding school for teenagers from socially disadvantaged families who led criminal lifestyles. McFadden worked there until his arrest.

== Serial murders ==
On October 6, 1994, McFadden was arrested in Rockland County, New York, on suspicion of rape and two counts of murder. He was charged with the rape of 55-year-old Jeremy Brown of South Nyack, who was abducted, beaten and sexually assaulted for five hours on September 6. The victim alleged that McFadden threatened her at gunpoint and forced her to withdraw $500 from various ATMs, which later allowed officers to obtain CCTV footage that clearly indicated that McFadden was the assailant. Brown would later positively identify him as the rapist after seeing the footage.

He was also charged with the rape-murder of 78-year-old Margaret Kierer, who had been stabbed to death and robbed in Floral Park on September 27. After the robberies, McFadden stole credit cards with which he bought various items over the following days. At the time of his arrest, McFadden was driving a car belonging to 42-year-old computer programmer Robert Silk, who went missing on September 6 from his home in Elmont, which immediately made him the prime suspect in the man's disappearance. Silk's skeletal remains would later be found in a creek in Nanuet on March 10, 1995, by a boy who had been crayfishing. After this, McFadden was charged with his murder.

According to investigators, Silk likely stopped his car to help McFadden, whose car had broken down in the parking lot of a supermarket and had been there for days after the former disappeared. The investigation revealed that McFadden had also been seen at one of the stores shortly before his arrest, paying for his purchases with Silk's bank card.

== Trials ==
=== First trial ===
At the request of the Rockland County Prosecutor's Office, it was decided that McFadden would be tried in three separate trials for each respective crime. His first trial, for the kidnapping and rape of Brown, began on August 2, 1995 - McFadden was allowed to represent himself. The victim testified that on September 21, 1994, she was assaulted as she left her home to throw out the garbage, and over the next five hours, McFadden raped her three times, beat her several times, then placed a bag over her head, put her in the back seat of a car and drove to various ATMs around Rockland County, where he forced her to withdraw a total of $500 at gunpoint. She said that he threatened to kill her, and after they had finished, he drove her back to her house, tied her up and laid her on the bed before promptly leaving. Supposedly, McFadden originally intended to kill her, but decided against it after realizing that she was an alcoholism counselor.

Brown testified that she remained restrained for several hours before partially freeing herself, whereupon she called some relatives to come help her. During cross-examinations in one of the hearings, she confidently identified McFadden as her rapist, but he denied responsibility. Instead, McFadden claimed that the jewelry found in his apartment was given to him by Muslim friends who had asked him to sell it at a pawnshop and then give the money to Bosniaks who fought in the Bosnian War. His arguments were rejected, and on August 25, a jury found McFadden guilty of nine counts, including rape, and later sentenced him to 70 years imprisonment, with a chance of parole after serving 25 years.

=== Second trial ===
In mid-September, McFadden was transferred to Nassau County, where he would stand trial for the murder of Margaret Kierer. On September 27, he pleaded guilty, claiming that he had attacked her in a fit of rage when he got lost trying to find his way to the train station. A few weeks later, he received a life term with a chance of parole. When asked if he had any final words for the court, McFadden said the following: "Sentence me to a thousand years. It won't make any difference."

=== Third trial ===
Shortly afterwards, McFadden was returned to Rockland County, where he would be tried for the murder of Robert Silk. On March 20, 1996, he was found guilty of all charges and sentenced to another life term with a chance of parole after serving 25 years. At his sentencing, McFadden told the judge that he had no remorse and that he blamed society for "making [him] that way".

== Possible additional victims ==
Aside from his known killings, McFadden was considered a suspect in the murder of 39-year-old Dana Blaise DeMarco, whose skeletal remains were found on March 26, 1996, near the Garden State Parkway. Dr. Frederick T. Zugibe, Rockland County's chief medical examiner, deduced that she was likely killed in late 1994, with fractures in the bones of her skull and cervical vertebrae indicating blunt force trauma and strangulation. McFadden was regarded as the prime suspect, but as he refused to cooperate with investigators and a lack of sufficient evidence, he was never charged with her murder. Others believed that he was responsible for other killings as well, due to an excessive amount of jewelry found in his apartment that was not linked to any of his known victims.

== Aftermath and change in the parole system ==
The McFadden case received widespread media coverage and caused public outcry. Throughout 1995, there was an intense period of introspection on the part of officials, who attempted to explain how McFadden had obtained parole and the reasons why he started killing again. As the circumstances of his parole were marked by bureaucratic ambiguity and outright confusion, in order to protect the public from impending future danger, discussions about the problems of rehabilitation and social reintegration of convicts, their rights and the safety of citizens emerged in both Pennsylvania and New York. Because McFadden was a juvenile at the time of the first murder, there was a debate about the need for schools to focus on identifying the causes that contributed to juvenile delinquency, as well as making efforts to rehabilitate current offenders. Jeremy Brown later met with the Attorney General of New York Dennis Vacco, who would later enact a series of reforms to change the law concerning parole boards and parole applications by inmates. In turn, on June 1, 1995, Governor of Pennsylvania Tom Ridge signed a bill requiring parolees with violent criminal records to spend at least one year in a pre-trial detention center and to be supervised by a probation officer for six months, at least once per week.

Following McFadden's conviction, a number of officials in the state of Pennsylvania were publicly condemned and their actions criticized. During the investigation, it was found that before voting to release him in 1992, the five members of the parole board had neither met nor spoken to McFadden, and made their decision to release him within minutes based on documents provided to them, most of which were prison reports from psychologists and prison officials. In addition, of the five volunteers assigned to him, three were over 65 years of age and had no experience with resocialization of former convicts.

The Chairman of the Parole Board, the then-Lieutenant Governor Mark Singel, denied all allegations against him and said that over the decades, McFadden was the only convict in the state's history to commit a series of sexually violent murders after receiving parole. Nevertheless, Singel's reputation was undermined, and subsequently lost his bid for governor against Tom Ridge.

At the legislative level, the state of Pennsylvania subsequently enacted a series of laws establishing procedures for considering clemency petitions for felons. After the laws were passed, the Governor of the state could only issue a pardon after a unanimous vote from the parole board, in contrast to the 4–1 majority vote in McFadden's case. In regards to Governor Robert Casey, he was accused of incompetence, with him later claiming that he was unable to look into the case in much detail due to health issues. Speaking on his behalf, his former chief legal advisor, Richard Spiegelman, informed the public that Casey had a huge backlog of work at the time and did not have the time to look into the McFadden case.

== Imprisonment and death ==
For the rest of his life, McFadden was incarcerated and moved around various facilities throughout New York. He began suffering from health issues in the late 2010s, and on March 6, 2023, he succumbed to an undisclosed illness at the Wende Correctional Facility in Alden.

== In the media and culture ==
In 2009, the 56-year-old McFadden was visited by journalists in prison. He was interviewed by former FBI profiler Mark Safarik, and later featured in the documentary series Criminal Mindscape. During the interview, McFadden recounted his version of events, downplaying his role in the murder of Rosenbaum and claiming that her death was an accident, due to which he should have been convicted of manslaughter and received a lesser prison sentence. He described one of his victims, Robert Silk, as a homosexual who had assaulted him, alleging that he had to kill him in self-defense. At the same time, McFadden told Safarik that decades of imprisonment had had negative effects on his psyche, describing himself as a black supremacist and a danger to society.

== See also ==
- List of serial killers in the United States
