= Mark Schweiker =

Governor of Pennsylvania from 2001 to 2003

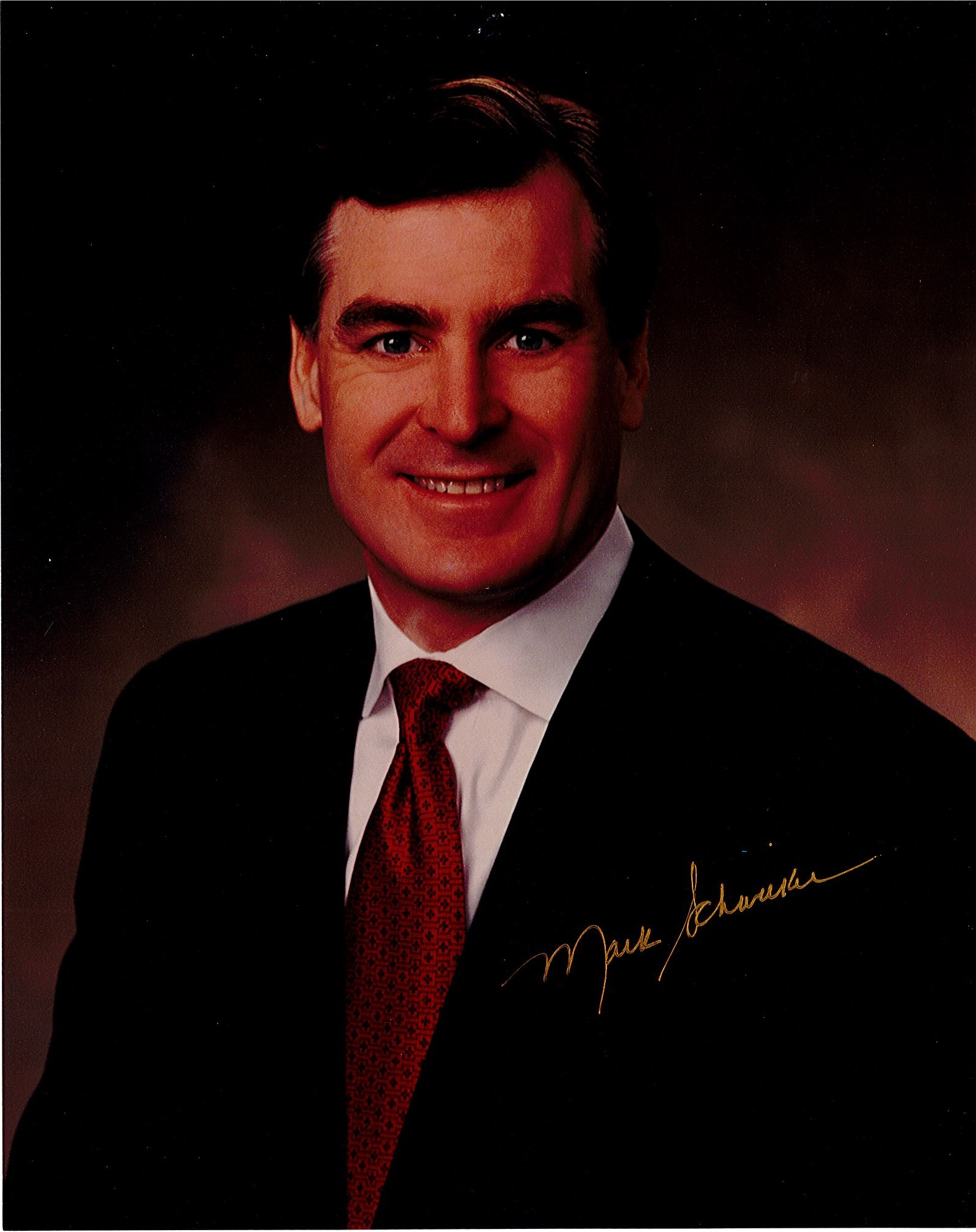
- Schweiker in 2001

44th Governor of Pennsylvania
- In office October 5, 2001 – January 21, 2003
- Lieutenant: Robert Jubelirer
- Preceded by: Tom Ridge
- Succeeded by: Ed Rendell

28th Lieutenant Governor of Pennsylvania
- In office January 17, 1995 – October 5, 2001
- Governor: Tom Ridge
- Preceded by: Mark Singel
- Succeeded by: Robert Jubelirer

Member of the Bucks County Board of Commissioners
- In office January 4, 1988 – January 17, 1995
- Preceded by: Carl Fonash
- Succeeded by: Mike Fitzpatrick

Personal details
- Born: Mark Stephen Schweiker; January 31, 1953 (age 73) Levittown, Pennsylvania, U.S.
- Party: Republican
- Spouse: Katherine Reichert
- Children: 3
- Education: Bloomsburg University (BS); Rider University (MS)

Mark Stephen Schweiker (English pronunciation: [mˈɑː͡ɹk stˈiːvən ʃwˈe͡ɪkɚ]; born January 31, 1953) is an American businessman and politician who served as the 44th governor of Pennsylvania from October 5, 2001, to January 21, 2003. Schweiker, a Republican, assumed the governorship in 2001, when his predecessor, Tom Ridge, resigned to become Homeland Security Advisor to President George W. Bush. Schweiker serves as the SVP and Chief Relationship Officer of Renmatix.

== Early life ==
Mark Schweiker, second son of John and Mary Schweiker, was born in Levittown, Bucks County, Pennsylvania. He is of German and Irish descent. He attended Bishop Egan High School in Bucks County and earned a Bachelor of Science degree from Bloomsburg University of Pennsylvania. He holds a master's degree in administration from Rider University. He was awarded an honorary Doctor of Law degree from Rider University in 2004. After college he entered the business world and held positions at Sadlier Oxford and McGraw Hill. Later, he formed his own management consulting firm.

== Political career ==
=== Bucks County politics ===
Schweiker entered politics in 1979 when he successfully ran for supervisor of Middletown Township. In 1987, he was elected Bucks County Commissioner. Schweiker and fellow Republican Andrew Warren overturned a Democratic majority on the board, largely on the strength of opposition to a water project planned for Point Pleasant.

=== Lieutenant governor ===
In 1994, Schweiker successfully ran for the Republican nomination for Lieutenant Governor. Schweiker ran in the fall general election alongside Congressman Tom Ridge, the gubernatorial nominee. The Ridge/Schweiker ticket won the election, beating the Democratic ticket of incumbent Lieutenant Governor Mark Singel (the gubernatorial nominee), and State Labor and Industry Secretary Tom Foley (the nominee for Lieutenant Governor) by a margin of 45.40% to 39.89%. Constitution Party candidate Peg Luksik captured 12.8 percent of the vote. The Ridge–Schweiker ticket easily won re-election in 1998.

As lieutenant governor, Schweiker chaired the Pennsylvania Emergency Management Council, The Board of Pardons, The Governor's Council on Recycling Development and Waste Reduction, oversaw the State-wide Radio Network, and was involved with Pennsylvania's anti-terrorism task force and the "Weed and Seed" anti-crime initiative.

In a 2002 PoliticsPA feature story designating politicians with yearbook superlatives, he was named "Missing in Action".

=== Governor ===
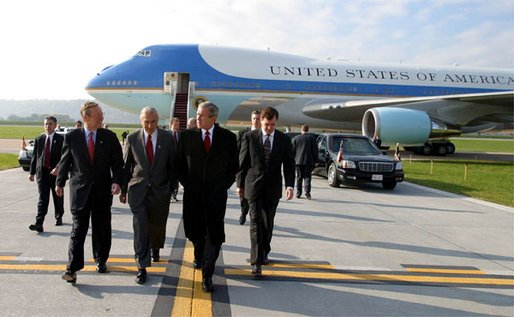
Mark Schweiker far right in 2002

Schweiker had decided against a run for the governor's office in 2002 and was preparing to finish out his term when the September 11 terrorist attack occurred. Ridge resigned as governor on October 5, 2001, to join the Bush administration as Homeland Security Advisor.

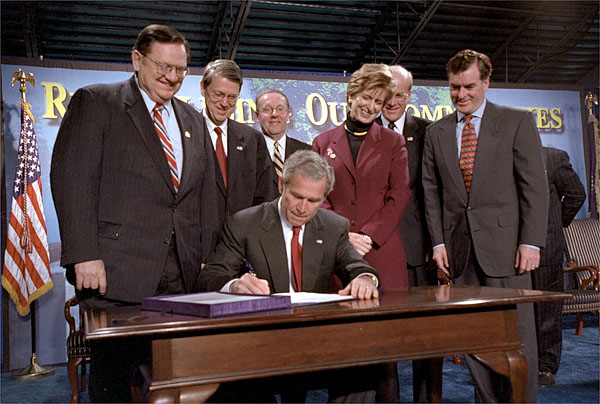
Schweiker, from the far right, watches as President George W. Bush signs the Brownfields Bill in 2002

Schweiker began preparing for the transition as governor on September 20, and was formally sworn in as Pennsylvania's 44th governor on the day of Ridge's resignation. By provision of the Pennsylvania Constitution, Robert Jubelirer, the President Pro Tempore of the State Senate, became lieutenant governor. This became a matter of controversy as Jubelirer retained his leadership position and seat in the State Senate.

In the wake of the terrorist attacks, Schweiker moved to secure Pennsylvania's five nuclear reactors, created the Governor's Task Force on Security by executive order, and expanded the ranks of the Pennsylvania State Police. Schweiker also faced budget shortfalls due to the economic collapse following the attacks and a crisis in the School District of Philadelphia.

Schweiker negotiated the state takeover of the school district and also was the first governor of Pennsylvania to put state funds into pre-school activities. He also passed tort reform measures, replacing Ridge, a former trial lawyer who was less inclined to push those measures.

Schweiker oversaw the Quecreek Mine rescue in Somerset County, in July 2002, a 77-hour operation that saved the lives of all nine trapped coal miners from the Quecreek mine. Following the rescue, Schweiker implemented a series of new safety procedures to provide better protection for miners.

Schweiker held to his decision not to stand for the 2002 governor's race despite several polls that showed him with a comfortable lead in a hypothetical match-up with eventual Democratic nominee Ed Rendell. However, he did send out a news release as a joke on April Fools' Day announcing his intention to run. Rendell won the election and was sworn in as Schweiker's successor on January 21, 2003.

Schweiker was named to the PoliticsPA list of "Sy Snyder's Power 50" list of influential individuals in Pennsylvania politics in 2003.

=== After governorship ===
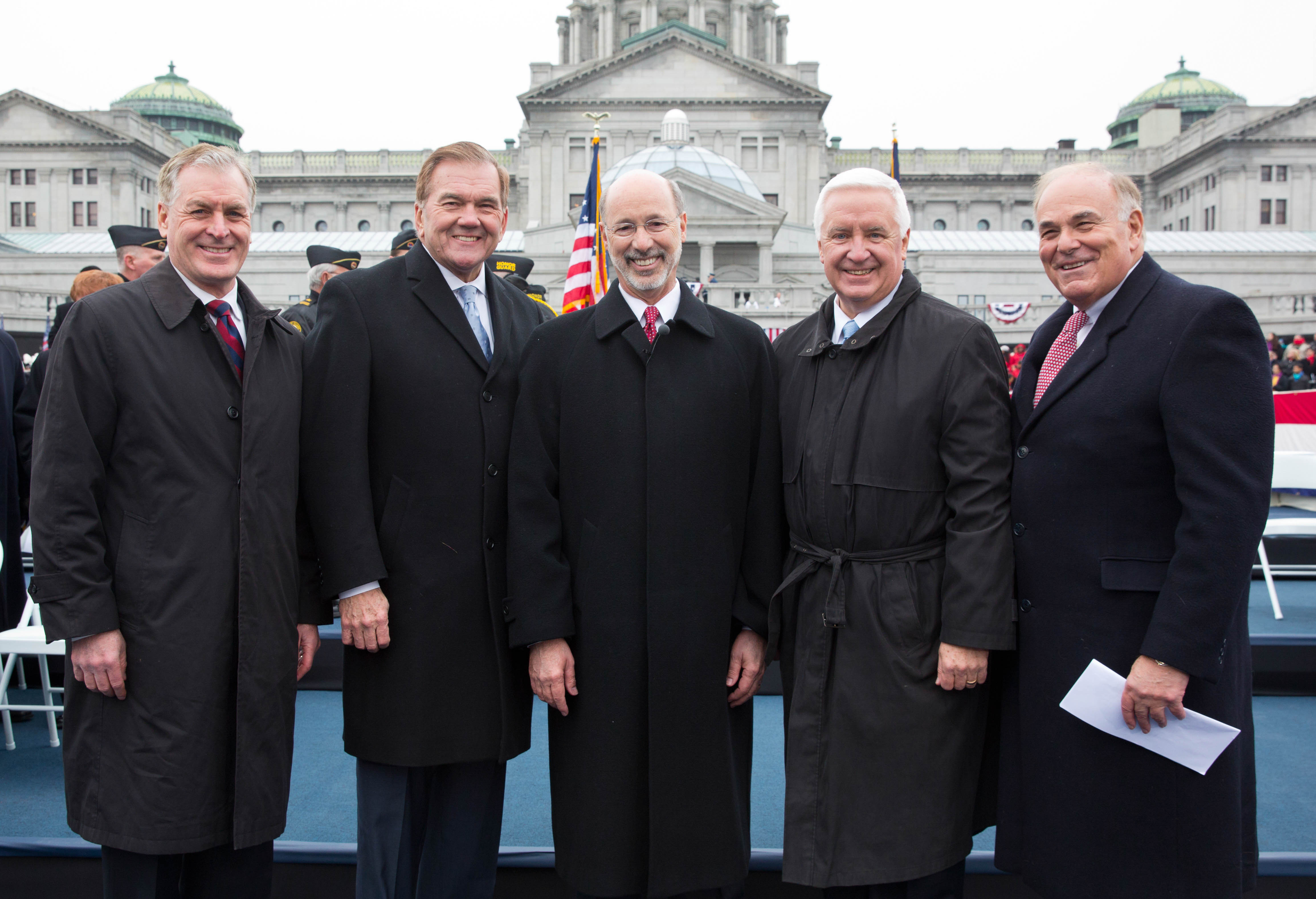
Schweiker with Governors Tom Ridge, Tom Wolf, Tom Corbett, and Ed Rendell in 2015

Schweiker left office when his term expired on January 21, 2003. He became president and CEO of the Greater Philadelphia Chamber of Commerce in February 2003 and served until 2009 when he announced his resignation to join Philadelphia-area pharmaceutical manufacturer PRWT as president of business process outsourcing. Schweiker is also a consultant to the law firm of Stradley Ronon.

His commitment to the Pennsylvania business community led him to his current position as the Chief Relationship Officer and SVP of the King of Prussia-based technology company Renmatix. Working closely with the company's technical team and board of directors, Schweiker has been instrumental in driving key initiatives with public and private sector stakeholders across several business areas including site selection for production facilities, financial partnerships, feedstock procurement, commercial programs, and public affairs. He plays a critical cross-functional role in accelerating corporate development in the United States and abroad.

Schweiker has been a vocal advocate of the United States' opportunity to take a leadership role in building a bioeconomy, while revitalizing rural economies. A trusted voice in the industry, Schweiker is a frequent speaker, addressing opportunities the bio-economy and green manufacturing can have in developing robust, economies centred around agricultural communities. His career has earned him many honours and awards, including Life Sciences Public Official of the Year, Speaker of the Year for Communications Excellence and Technology Advocate of the Year for Technology Innovation. Schweiker has also presented to Congress a number of times and appeared as a guest on CNN, FOX Business, PBS's Charlie Rose Show and NBC's Tonight Show. He has spoken at: the U.S. Global Leadership Coalition, the Atlantic's Town Hall Gathering and AgBiomass Canada.

In a 2016 article in The Huffington Post, Schweiker brought attention to the Indian government's renewed focus on bioethanol as a sustainable energy source for the country. He explained that "As the country emerges as a pivotal actor in international energy discussions, India's bio-energy strategy will provide a blueprint for other countries with plentiful agricultural waste to leverage and spur economic growth."

In January 2016, Schweiker endorsed state representative Scott Petri for the 8th District of Pennsylvania for Congress.

Schweiker, is listed as the executive-in-residence of Rider University’s homeland security program.

Party political offices
Preceded by Harold Mowery	Republican nominee for Lieutenant Governor of Pennsylvania; 1994, 1998	Succeeded by Jane Earll
Political offices
Preceded by Mark Singel	Lieutenant Governor of Pennsylvania; 1995–2001	Succeeded by Robert Jubelirer
Preceded by Tom Ridge	Governor of Pennsylvania; 2001–2003	Succeeded by Ed Rendell
U.S. order of precedence (ceremonial)
Preceded by Martha McSally as Former U.S. Senator	Order of precedence of the United States; Within Pennsylvania	Succeeded by Ed Rendell as Former Governor
Preceded by Bethany Hall-Long as Former Governor	Order of precedence of the United States; Outside Pennsylvania	Succeeded by Ed Rendell as Former Governor
