= Lynn Yeakel =

American politician (1941–2022)

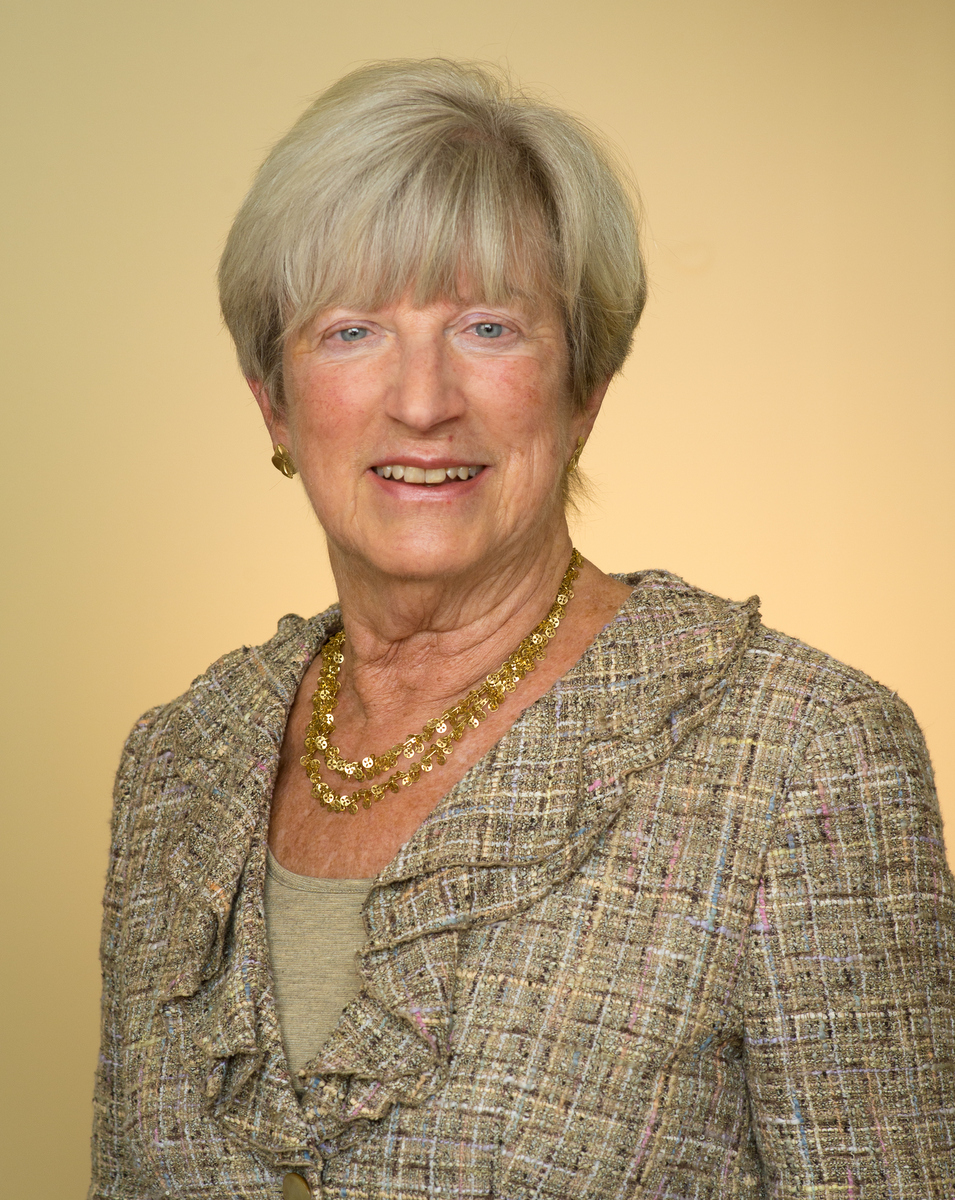

Personal details
- Born: Lynn Moore Hardy; July 9, 1941 Portsmouth, Virginia, U.S.
- Died: January 13, 2022 (aged 80) Fort Myers, Florida, U.S.
- Party: Democratic
- Spouse: Paul Yeakel
- Children: 2
- Parent: Porter Hardy Jr. (father)
- Education: Randolph College (BS); American College (MS)

Lynn Hardy Yeakel (July 9, 1941 – January 13, 2022) was an American administrator and political figure. She was the Director of Drexel University College of Medicine's Institute for Women's Health and Leadership and held the Betty A. Cohen Chair in Women's Health. Yeakel conducted an unsuccessful campaign for the U.S. Senate in 1992.

== Early life and education ==
Yeakel was born in Portsmouth, Virginia, to Lynn Moore, a teacher from Tennessee, and Porter Hardy Jr., who represented Virginia in Congress from 1947 through 1969. She was a Phi Beta Kappa graduate and former trustee of Randolph-Macon Woman's College, and was a recipient of an M.S. in Management from the American College.

== Institute for Women's Health and Leadership ==
Since Yeakel came to Drexel in 2002, the IWHL has grown in size and stature, earning a significant institutional commitment in the College of Medicine's 2007-2012 Strategic Plan as one of its top priorities. In addition to investing in extensive IWHL program expansion, Drexel constructed a new building on the College of Medicine's campus in Philadelphia to house the Institute and its core programs. Yeakel co-chaired a fundraising campaign to raise an additional $1.8 million for a permanent home for the Legacy Center (Archives and Special Collections) in the new building. IWHL, the International Center for Executive Leadership in Academics (home of the ELAM and ELATE programs) and the Legacy Center moved in at the end of 2009.

=== Vision 2020 ===
A major national initiative of the Institute, created and co-chaired by Yeakel, is VISION 2020, a ten-year project to achieve women's economic and social equality by the year 2020 when the nation celebrated the centennial of the 19th Amendment, granting women the right to vote. The project, which is now a Center in the Institute for Women's Health and Leadership, was launched in October 2010 with An American Conversation about Women and Leadership® at the National Constitution Center (NCC) in Philadelphia. Delegates from all 50 states and the District of Columbia participated. A women's history exhibition, commissioned by the Institute, opened at the NCC in conjunction with the Conversation. Subsequent Congresses were held in Chicago (2011), Portland, OR (2012), and Philadelphia (2014). In June 2013, at the invitation of the University of Edinburgh in Scotland, Yeakel led a Vision 2020 delegation to an international conference on Women and Warfare and moderated the closing debate in Scottish Parliament.

Vision 2020 is allied with more than 80 national organizations representing 20 million women and girls that endorse the goal of women's equality. Yeakel and her team have raised over $3 million for Vision 2020 and have announced plans to host the national centennial celebration of the 19th Amendment in the year 2020 in collaboration with the National Constitution Center and the City of Philadelphia.

=== Other programs developed ===
Other programs developed and led by Yeakel include "Conversations about Women's Health," a popular community education program, and the Woman One Award and Scholarship Fund, raising funds for medical tuition scholarships for minority women. There are currently eight Woman One Scholars studying medicine at Drexel, plus 16 who have graduated and are practicing medicine in underserved areas around the nation; three new Scholars entered in August 2014. Each Scholar receives $80,000 in tuition support over four years.

Yeakel was also a founder and Board Chair of Women's Way, the first and largest women's fundraising coalition in the nation, and served as its CEO from 1980 until 1992.

== Political career ==
=== Campaigns ===
==== 1992 Senate campaign ====
A founder and former chief executive of the first and largest women's funding federation in the U.S., Women's Way, Yeakel won the primary in a U.S. Senate campaign in 1992 – the "Year of the Woman" – and nearly unseated incumbent Senator Arlen Specter in a nationally publicized race. The following year she lectured on more than a dozen college campuses and for numerous organizations across the U.S. and abroad.

==== Subsequent campaigns ====
In 1994, she ran for governor, finishing fourth in a seven-person primary field, behind State Treasurer Catherine Baker Knoll, State Representative Dwight Evans and the winner, Mark Singel, who went on to lose the general election to Congressman Tom Ridge. Yeakel ran her final campaign in 2000, when she challenged incumbent Republican State Senator Dick Tilghman for his 17th District seat. She lost the election by about 800 votes, out of over 100,000 cast.

=== Appointed positions ===
Appointed by President Bill Clinton as the Mid-Atlantic Regional Director for the U.S. Department of Health and Human Services, Yeakel served in that role from 1994-2000. Her leadership initiatives there included the Freedom from Fear campaign to end family violence and "Envisioning a Healthier Philadelphia," a coalition of more than 60 public and private organizations dedicated to improving access to health care. She also chaired the region's Welfare Reform Team, the Child Health Initiative and the Combined Federal Campaign and served on the national committee to implement the federal Violence Against Women Act (VAWA). In 2010, she was appointed to the Commonwealth of Pennsylvania's Health Care Reform Implementation Advisory Committee, developing recommendations for the Governor on the new federal legislation.

== Honors and awards ==
A Phi Beta Kappa graduate and former trustee of Randolph-Macon Woman's College, Yeakel received a Master of Science in Management degree from the American College. She was a past president or chair of many local and national non-profit organizations, including among others AccessMatters, the Junior League of Philadelphia, the 21st Century League, the Citizens' Coalition for Energy Efficiency, the National Committee for Responsive Philanthropy and the board of overseers of the Annenberg Center for the Performing Arts at the University of Pennsylvania. She served as an advisor to the Bryn Mawr College Graduate School of Social Work and Social Research, the Center for the Advancement of Girls at the Agnes Irwin School, the Women's Resource Center and the Professional Women's Roundtable. She was a member of the Advisory Board of the Penn/ICOWHI 18th Congress, entitled Cities and Women's Health: Global Perspectives held in Philadelphia in the spring of 2010.

A member of the Pennsylvania Women's Forum and the Forum of Executive Women, and a Fellow of the College of Physicians of Philadelphia, Lynn Yeakel has received numerous honors and awards, including the Pennsylvania Citizen Action Award and the Lucretia Mott Award. She was named a Distinguished Daughter of Pennsylvania in 1989, received the MCP/Gimbel Award for humanitarian contributions in 1987, and was named a "Woman of Distinction" by the Philadelphia Business Journal in 2004. In 2006, she was identified as a Top Connector by LEADERSHIP Philadelphia and in 2008 was honored again by that organization as one of its top 50 alumni during the celebration of its 50th anniversary. She received the first Susan Myers Leadership and Community Activism Award from the Junior League of Philadelphia (2009), the John Gardner Lifetime Achievement Award from Common Cause (2010), and a Lifetime Achievement Award from the Red Cross of Southeastern Pennsylvania (2011). She was honored by the Girl Scouts of Eastern Pennsylvania with a Take the Lead Award (2012), and by the Alice Paul Institute with the Alice Paul Equality Award (2013). She was a frequent speaker at women's and girls' leadership forums.

== Publications ==
Her autobiographical book, "A Will and a Way," was published in fall 2010.

== Personal life and death ==
In 1965, she married Paul Yeakel. They had two children and six grandchildren. Lynn Yeakel died from complications of a blood cancer in Fort Myers, Florida, on January 13, 2022, at the age of 80.

Party political offices
Preceded by Bob Edgar	Democratic nominee for U.S. Senator from Pennsylvania (Class 3); 1992	Succeeded by Bill Lloyd
