= Mark Singel =

American politician

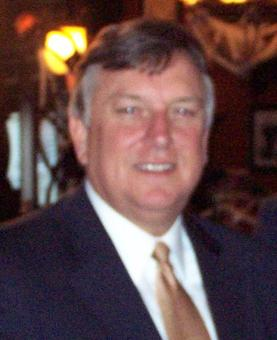

Chair of the Pennsylvania Democratic Party
- In office June 3, 1995 – December 31, 1997
- Preceded by: Linda Rhodes
- Succeeded by: Tina Tartaglione

Governor of Pennsylvania
- Acting
- In office June 14, 1993 – December 13, 1993
- Preceded by: Bob Casey
- Succeeded by: Bob Casey

27th Lieutenant Governor of Pennsylvania
- In office January 20, 1987 – January 17, 1995
- Governor: Bob Casey
- Preceded by: William Scranton
- Succeeded by: Mark Schweiker

Member of the Pennsylvania Senate from the 35th district
- In office January 6, 1981 – January 20, 1987
- Preceded by: Lou Coppersmith
- Succeeded by: William Stewart

Personal details
- Born: Mark Stephen Singel; September 12, 1953 (age 73) Johnstown, Pennsylvania, U.S.
- Party: Democratic
- Education: Pennsylvania State University, University Park (BA)

Mark Stephen Singel (born September 12, 1953) is an American politician who served as the 27th lieutenant governor of Pennsylvania from 1987 to 1995, alongside Governor Bob Casey. Singel served as the state's acting governor from June 14, 1993 to December 13, 1993, during Casey's lengthy battle with amyloidosis and subsequent multiple organ transplant.

== Early life ==
Singel was born in Johnstown, Pennsylvania. A graduate of Penn State University.

== Political career ==
Singel was elected to the Pennsylvania State Senate in 1980. After winning reelection in 1984, he sought and won the Democratic nomination for Lieutenant Governor in 1986. As Casey's running mate, the Democratic ticket won a narrow victory over the Republican ticket of incumbent Lieutenant Governor William Scranton III and State Senator Mike Fisher. Casey and Singel won re-election in 1990.

During his second term, Governor Casey was diagnosed with Appalachian familial amyloidosis, a rare and usually fatal liver disorder. Casey required a risky experimental multiple organ transplant. During his lengthy recovery, Singel served as Pennsylvania's acting governor.

Singel sought and lost the Democratic senatorial nomination in 1992 to Lynn Yeakel, who went on to narrowly lose the general election to incumbent Arlen Specter.

In 1993, while serving as lieutenant and acting governor, Singel disenfranchised the Pennsylvania 10th Senatorial District for 11 months to gain a numeric political advantage for his party. The advantage was soon lost.

=== 1994 gubernatorial campaign ===
Singel won the Democratic gubernatorial nomination in 1994 and faced Republican U.S. Congressman Tom Ridge in the general election. Singel lost the general election to Ridge. Some people in the party blamed Casey for Singel's loss, noting that Casey, who was anti-abortion, gave only lackluster support to the pro-choice Singel. Casey declined to either campaign or raise money for Singel's candidacy – an incident that reportedly caused a deep rift between the two men.

Singel's loss was also attributed to the influence of the Reginald McFadden case. McFadden had been sentenced to life in prison in 1970 for a robbery/homicide. In 1992, the Pennsylvania Board of Pardons voted to release him. At the time, Singel, as Lt. Governor, served on the board and had voted in favor of McFadden's release. The vote of the entire board was 4 - 1 in favor of release. In 1994 (during the gubernatorial race), McFadden was released from prison (after Gov. Casey signed the commutation papers) and subsequently murdered two people and kidnapped and raped a third within 90 days of being released. When news of the murders broke, Singel's opponent, Tom Ridge, turned Singel's vote to release McFadden into a campaign issue. This issue, which was compared to the case of Willie Horton, was cited as another reason why Singel lost the campaign. The story of Reginald McFadden's crime spree was later the focus of an episode of This American Life.

== Later career ==
After Singel's unsuccessful gubernatorial bid, he remained active in Democratic politics. He served as chairman of the Pennsylvania Democratic Party from June 3, 1995 to December 31, 1997 and was a Presidential Elector in 1996. He briefly considered running against Senator Rick Santorum in 2000, but withdrew his name from consideration and backed eventual nominee, Pittsburgh-area Congressman Ron Klink.

In 2000, Singel joined the Philadelphia-based law firm Duane Morris as lobbyist and director of its Johnstown, Pennsylvania, branch office. Singel started his own firm, The Winter Group, in 2005 and continues to practice government affairs today in downtown Harrisburg.

The Pennsylvania Report named him to the 2003 "The Pennsylvania Report Power 75" list of influential figures in Pennsylvania politics, describing him as a Harrisburg lobbyist and "Rendell Confidante" and noting that he had been a prominent surrogate for Rendell during the 2002 gubernatorial election and "had a big hand in filling positions with the new [Rendell] administration." He also occasionally teaches classes at the local Penn State Harrisburg campus. He was named to the PoliticsPA list of "Sy Snyder's Power 50" list of influential individuals in Pennsylvania politics in 2003.

On February 19, 2010, Singel announced his intention to run in the special election to fill the seat of the late Democrat John Murtha, provided Murtha's widow decided not to run. He ended his bid for Congress ten days later, citing the need for the party to unite behind one candidate.

Party political offices
Preceded by Jim Lloyd	Democratic nominee for Lieutenant Governor of Pennsylvania; 1986, 1990	Succeeded by Tom Foley
Preceded by Bob Casey	Democratic nominee for Governor of Pennsylvania; 1994	Succeeded by Ivan Itkin
Preceded by Linda Rhodes	Chair of the Pennsylvania Democratic Party; 1995–1997	Succeeded by Tina Tartaglione
Political offices
Preceded by William Scranton	Lieutenant Governor of Pennsylvania; 1987–1995	Succeeded by Mark Schweiker
Preceded by Bob Casey	Governor of Pennsylvania; Acting; 1993	Succeeded by Bob Casey
