= Year of the Woman =

1992 election of four women to the U.S. Senate

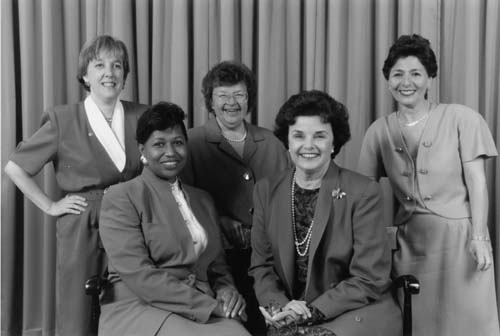
The Senate Democratic women in 1993. L-R: Patty Murray, Carol Moseley Braun, Barbara Mikulski, Dianne Feinstein, and Barbara Boxer

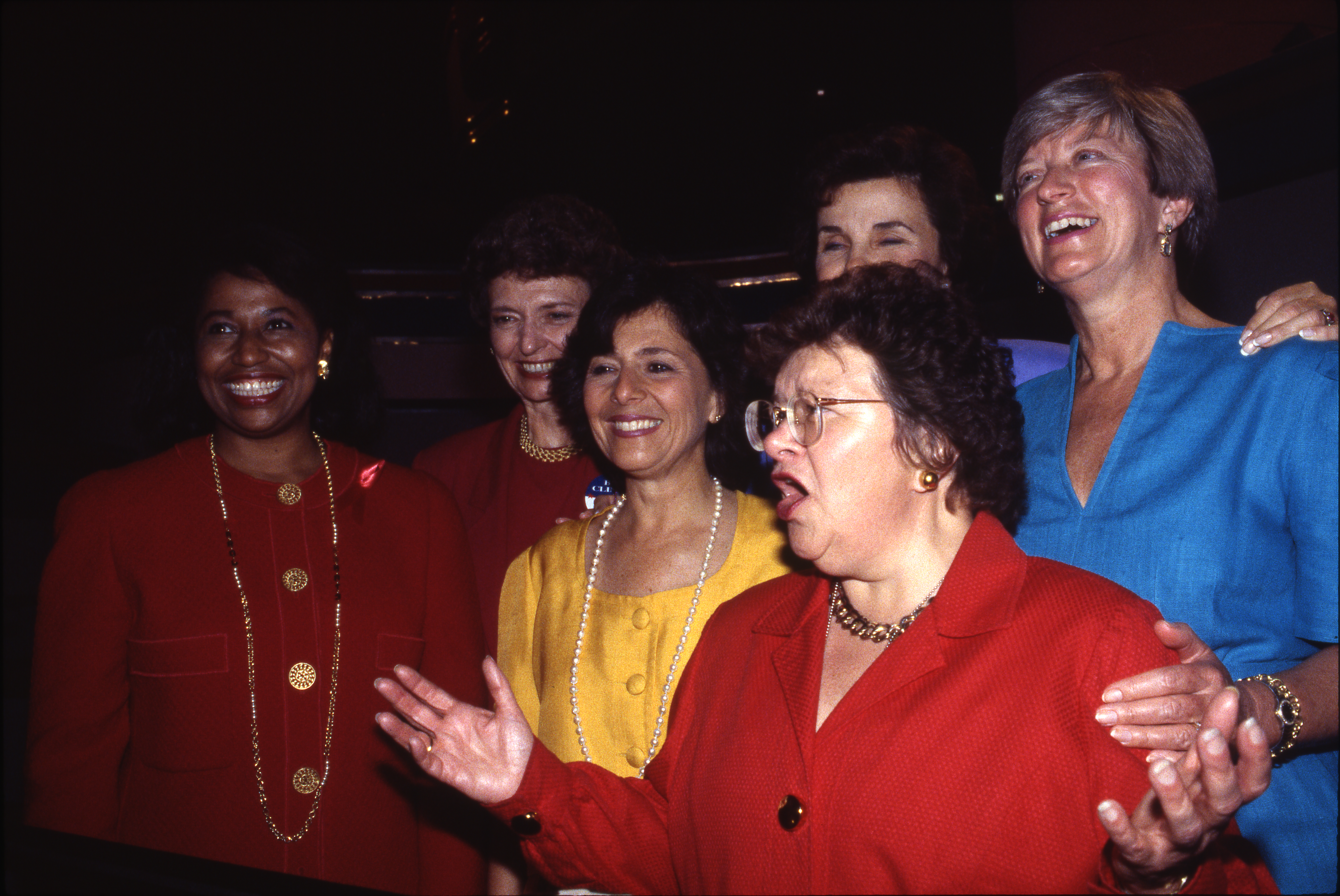
Senator Barbara Mikulski standing with female senatorial candidates (left to right) Carol Moseley-Braun, Jean Hall Lloyd-Jones, Barbara Boxer, Dianne Feinstein and Lynn Yeakel at the 1992 Democratic National Convention, Madison Square Garden, New York City.

The Year of the Woman was a popular label attached to 1992 after the election of a number of female senators in the United States. The term has also been used with respect to the 2018 House elections, in which a record 103 women were elected, 90 of whom were Democrats.

== Background ==
The hotly contested Senate confirmation hearings in 1991 for Supreme Court nominee Clarence Thomas involving the allegations of Anita Hill raised the question of the dominance of men in the Senate.

== Election ==
In 1991, the Senate included two female members, but neither Nancy Kassebaum of Kansas nor Barbara Mikulski of Maryland served on the Judiciary Committee. Reportedly, Washington state senator Patty Murray decided to run for the U.S. Senate after watching these hearings.

While Murray set out to raise the necessary funds, two other women several hundred miles to the south in California began work on their own Senate campaigns. As a result, on January 3, 1993, for the first time in American history, California became the first state in the nation to be represented in the Senate by two women. In the 1992 elections, Dianne Feinstein, a former Democratic mayor of San Francisco, running for the balance of an uncompleted term, beat her opponent with a margin of nearly two million votes, while Barbara Boxer—a 10-year veteran of the U.S. House of Representatives who had joined six of her Democratic women colleagues in a march on the Senate to urge greater attention to Anita Hill's charges—solidly won a full term.

At a presidential debate at the University of Richmond, President George H. W. Bush was asked when his party might nominate a woman for president. Bush, noting that the women running that year were predominantly liberal Democrats, stated "This is supposed to be the year of the women in the Senate. Let's see how they do. I hope a lot of them lose."

A week after the election, a popular Washington Post photograph illustrated the situation. Standing with exultant Democratic Majority Leader George Mitchell were not only Murray, Feinstein and Boxer but also Carol Moseley Braun of Illinois, the first black woman elected to the Senate. Never before had four women been elected to the Senate in a single election year. (Five, if Mikulski's successful re-election bid that year is counted.) Within months, another woman senator would join them: Kay Bailey Hutchison of Texas, who won a special election in June 1993.

When the newcomers joined incumbents Kassebaum and Mikulski in January 1993, headline-writers described the occurrence as "The Year of the Woman." In response, Senator Mikulski said, "Calling 1992 the Year of the Woman makes it sound like the Year of the Caribou or the Year of the Asparagus. We're not a fad, a fancy, or a year." Mikulski predicted that, as more women joined the Senate, the novelty of a female senator would fade; as more women joined the Senate in the coming years, this prediction came true.

== See also ==
- Blair Babes
- Women in the United States Senate
