= 1998 Pennsylvania gubernatorial election =

- November 3, 1998
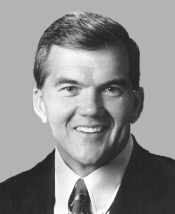

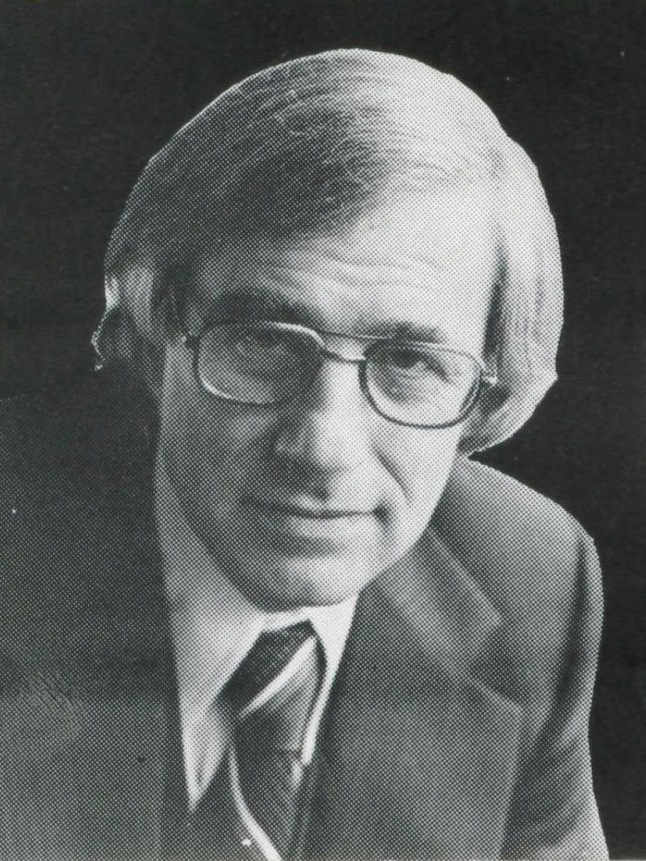

Nominee	Tom Ridge	Ivan Itkin	Peg Luksik
Party	Republican	Democratic	Constitution
Running mate	Mark Schweiker	Marjorie Margolies-Mezvinsky	Jim Clymer
Popular vote	1,736,844	938,745	315,761
Percentage	57.42%	31.03%	10.43%
- Ridge: 30–40% 40–50% 50–60% 60–70% 70–80% 80–90% >90% Itkin: 30–40% 40–50% 50–60% 60–70% 70–80% 80–90% >90% Luksik: 30–40% 40–50% 50–60% 60–70% Tie: 30–40% 40–50% 50–60% No data
Governor before election
Tom Ridge
Republican
Elected Governor
Tom Ridge
Republican

The 1998 Pennsylvania gubernatorial election was held on November 3, 1998 to elect the governor and lieutenant governor of Pennsylvania. Republican incumbent Tom Ridge was re-elected to a second term in office over Democratic state representative Ivan Itkin and anti-abortion activist Peg Luksik.

As of 2026, this was the last gubernatorial election in which Delaware, Lackawanna or Montgomery counties voted for the Republican candidate and the last time a Republican was re-elected as governor of Pennsylvania. It was also the first time since 1930 that Greene, Fayette, or Washington counties voted Republican.

== Republican primary ==
Incumbent Governor Ridge ran unopposed for the Republican nomination, and was endorsed by multiple newspapers across the state, including the York Daily Record.

== Democratic primary ==
=== Candidates ===
- Don Bailey, former U.S. representative from Greensburg and Pennsylvania auditor general
- Ivan Itkin, state representative from Pittsburgh
- Bill Keisling, anti-corruption activist from York

=== Campaign ===
Itkin, although not well known in the state, was a powerful figure in the legislature and had the backing of the party establishment, while the conservative Bailey drew strong union support.

=== Results ===
Democratic primary results Itkin: 30%-40%; 40%-50%; 50%-60%; 60%-70%; Bailey: 30%-40%; 40%-50%; 50%-60%; 60%-70%; 70%-80%; Keisling: 30%-40%; 40%-50%

Pennsylvania gubernatorial Democratic primary, 1998
Party	Candidate	Votes	%
Democratic	Ivan Itkin	255,555	49.17
Democratic	Don Bailey	200,451	38.57
Democratic	Bill Keisling	63,696	12.26
Total votes		519,702	100.00

== General election ==
=== Candidates ===
- Ivan Itkin, state representative (Democratic)
  - Running mate: Marjorie Margolies-Mezvinsky, former U.S. representative from Narberth
- Ken Krawchuk, technology consultant (Libertarian)
  - Running mate: Henry Haller, attorney
- Peg Luksik, anti-abortion activist and 1994 candidate for governor (Constitution)
  - Running mate: Jim Clymer, attorney and 1994 nominee for lieutenant governor
- Tom Ridge, incumbent governor since 1995 (Republican)
  - Running mate: Mark Schweiker, incumbent lieutenant governor since 1995

=== Campaign ===
During this election cycle, Democrats struggled with fundraising issues and had difficulty recruiting a top tier candidate. Itkin, who had little name recognition statewide, was considered to be a sacrificial lamb. Peg Luksik, who was well known as an outspoken opponent of abortion, ran as a strong third party contender for the second consecutive election cycle; she emphasized the pro-choice stances of both candidates and drew votes in the state's rural, conservative center. However, Ridge's victory was never in doubt, as he ran on a generally positive record from his prior term and a combination of traditional Republican strategies (such as his "tough on crime" image) combined with his ability to somewhat undercut Democratic support (such as through his labor ties).

=== Polling ===
Poll source	Date(s)	Sample size (Note: Key: A – all adults RV – registered voters LV – likely voters V – unclear)	Margin of error	Tom Ridge (R)	Ivan Itkin (D)	Peg Luksik (C)	Other / undecided (Note: Calculated by taking the difference of 100% and all other candidates combined.)
Harris Insights & Analytics	October 30, 1998	1,812	—	62%	21%	17%	
Mason-Dixon Polling & Strategy	October 26–27, 1998	807 (LV)	± 3.5%	59%	23%	10%	8%
Millersville University	October 25, 1998	481	—	66%	15%	19%	
Harris Insights & Analytics	October 20, 1998	1,611	—	64%	16%	20%	
Mason-Dixon Polling & Strategy	October 3–6, 1998	801 (LV)	± 3.5%	58%	24%	18%	
Millersville University (Note: Poll sponsored by KYW-TV3, the Philadelphia Daily News, & the Harrisburg Patriot)	September 25–29, 1998	629 (A)	± 4.6%	56%	17%	27%	
Mason-Dixon Polling & Strategy	September 14–16, 1998	806 (LV)	± 3.5%	59%	23%	18%	
Mason-Dixon Polling & Strategy	August 2–4, 1998	806 (LV)	± 3.5%	57%	22%	21%	

=== Results ===
1998 Pennsylvania gubernatorial election
Party	Candidate	Votes	%
Republican	Tom Ridge (incumbent)	1,736,844	57.42
Democratic	Ivan Itkin	938,745	31.03
Constitution	Peg Luksik	315,761	10.43
Libertarian	Ken Krawchuk	33,591	1.11
Write-in		281	0.01
Total votes		3,025,022	100.0
Turnout			41.67
Republican hold			

==== Results by county ====
County	Tom Ridge Republican		Ivan Itkin Democratic		Peg Luksik Constitution		Ken Krawchuk Libertarian		Margin		Total votes cast
County	#	%	#	%	#	%	#	%	#	%	Total votes cast
Adams	14,810	73.83%	3,682	18.35%	1,360	6.78%	208	1.04%	11,128	55.48%	20,060
Allegheny	169,316	48.14%	127,994	36.39%	50,689	14.41%	3,719	1.06%	41,322	11.75%	351,718
Armstrong	8,641	48.71%	4,900	27.62%	4,098	23.10%	99	0.56%	3,741	21.09%	17,738
Beaver	24,993	47.14%	19,879	37.49%	7,669	14.46%	477	0.90%	5,114	9.65%	53,018
Bedford	8,232	68.25%	2,322	19.25%	1,427	11.83%	81	0.67%	5,910	49.00%	12,062
Berks	49,716	62.51%	21,336	26.83%	6,926	8.71%	1,553	1.95%	28,380	35.68%	79,531
Blair	19,025	67.54%	4,410	15.66%	4,518	16.04%	216	0.77%	14,507	51.50% (Note: Compares margin over Luksik.)	28,169
Bradford	12,534	74.70%	3,041	18.12%	1,101	6.56%	104	0.62%	9,493	56.58%	16,780
Bucks	93,697	64.85%	39,210	27.14%	9,145	6.33%	2,431	1.68%	54,487	37.71%	144,483
Butler	22,839	51.22%	10,593	23.76%	10,759	24.13%	395	0.89%	12,080	27.09%	44,586
Cambria	22,266	49.51%	12,675	28.18%	9,721	21.61%	313	0.70%	9,591	21.33%	44,975
Cameron	688	42.76%	266	16.53%	646	40.15%	9	0.56%	42	2.61%	1,609
Carbon	7,503	54.98%	5,246	38.44%	716	5.25%	183	1.34%	2,257	16.54%	13,648
Centre	20,175	65.15%	7,295	23.56%	3,100	10.01%	397	1.28%	12,880	41.59%	30,967
Chester	68,572	67.62%	21,337	21.04%	9,786	9.65%	1,714	1.69%	47,235	46.58%	101,409
Clarion	5,861	57.21%	2,112	20.62%	2,182	21.30%	89	0.87%	3,679	35.91%	10,244
Clearfield	11,437	56.10%	5,598	27.46%	3,215	15.77%	135	0.66%	5,839	28.64%	20,385
Clinton	5,348	62.28%	2,656	30.93%	487	5.67%	96	1.12%	2,692	31.35%	8,587
Columbia	8,720	60.58%	4,175	29.00%	1,401	9.73%	99	0.69%	4,545	31.58%	14,395
Crawford	13,875	63.30%	4,786	21.83%	3,065	13.98%	195	0.89%	9,089	41.47%	21,921
Cumberland	37,801	70.93%	8,610	16.16%	6,360	11.93%	522	0.98%	29,191	54.77%	53,293
Dauphin	39,914	64.79%	13,203	21.43%	7,871	12.78%	615	1.00%	26,711	43.36%	61,603
Delaware	97,746	63.32%	42,283	27.39%	12,368	8.01%	1,976	1.28%	55,463	35.93%	154,373
Elk	4,520	49.43%	2,500	27.34%	2,073	22.67%	51	0.56%	2,020	22.09%	9,144
Erie	49,027	63.68%	16,783	21.80%	10,450	13.57%	724	0.94%	32,244	41.88%	76,984
Fayette	13,215	43.88%	12,863	42.71%	3,699	12.28%	342	1.14%	352	1.17%	30,119
Forest	987	63.80%	375	24.24%	181	11.70%	4	0.26%	612	39.56%	1,547
Franklin	21,793	69.67%	6,527	20.87%	2,759	8.82%	200	0.64%	15,266	48.80%	31,279
Fulton	2,210	66.25%	885	26.53%	230	6.89%	11	0.33%	1,325	39.72%	3,336
Greene	4,211	45.88%	3,900	42.49%	963	10.49%	104	1.13%	311	3.39%	9,178
Huntingdon	6,253	65.25%	1,936	20.20%	1,320	13.77%	74	0.77%	4,317	45.05%	9,583
Indiana	11,733	50.73%	6,910	29.88%	4,334	18.74%	152	0.66%	4,823	20.85%	23,129
Jefferson	6,493	58.08%	2,473	22.12%	2,131	19.06%	82	0.73%	4,020	35.96%	11,179
Juniata	3,947	65.98%	1,266	21.16%	740	12.37%	29	0.48%	2,681	44.82%	5,982
Lackawanna	35,039	52.96%	25,297	38.24%	5,208	7.87%	615	0.93%	9,742	14.72%	66,159
Lancaster	72,198	72.13%	15,891	15.88%	11,169	11.16%	841	0.84%	56,307	56.25%	100,099
Lawrence	13,115	51.46%	9,259	36.33%	2,956	11.60%	154	0.60%	3,856	15.13%	25,484
Lebanon	20,263	72.70%	4,775	17.13%	2,588	9.28%	247	0.89%	15,488	55.57%	27,873
Lehigh	50,526	65.79%	22,472	29.26%	2,890	3.76%	910	1.18%	28,054	36.53%	76,798
Luzerne	44,030	58.96%	23,827	31.90%	6,125	8.20%	702	0.94%	20,203	27.06%	74,864
Lycoming	20,511	70.85%	6,058	20.93%	2,102	7.26%	280	0.97%	14,453	49.92%	28,951
McKean	6,742	68.43%	2,086	21.17%	939	9.53%	85	0.86%	4,656	47.26%	9,852
Mercer	15,958	52.77%	10,349	34.23%	3,704	12.25%	227	0.75%	5,609	18.54%	30,238
Mifflin	6,914	71.01%	2,010	20.65%	723	7.43%	89	0.91%	4,904	50.36%	9,736
Monroe	17,243	65.97%	7,160	27.40%	1,345	5.15%	388	1.48%	10,083	7.84%	26,136
Montgomery	129,376	61.42%	62,734	29.78%	14,959	7.10%	3,567	1.69%	66,642	31.64%	210,636
Montour	2,700	64.18%	1,012	24.06%	469	11.15%	26	0.62%	1,688	40.12%	4,207
Northampton	42,352	64.15%	20,461	30.99%	2,337	3.54%	867	1.31%	21,891	33.16%	66,017
Northumberland	13,468	58.95%	7,051	30.86%	2,011	8.80%	317	1.39%	6,417	28.09%	22,847
Perry	7,023	68.83%	1,487	14.57%	1,604	15.72%	89	0.87%	5,419	53.11%	10,203
Philadelphia	107,731	35.06%	183,066	59.58%	13,072	4.25%	3,401	1.11%	-75,335	-24.52%	307,270
Pike	6,843	68.45%	2,726	27.27%	333	3.33%	95	0.95%	4,117	41.18%	9,997
Potter	3,121	68.53%	963	21.15%	449	9.86%	21	0.46%	2,158	47.38%	4,554
Schuylkill	27,992	63.14%	12,108	27.31%	3,920	8.84%	313	0.71%	15,884	35.83%	44,333
Snyder	5,565	69.95%	1,405	17.66%	919	11.55%	67	0.84%	4,160	52.29%	7,956
Somerset	14,829	61.15%	5,676	23.40%	3,569	14.72%	178	0.73%	9,153	37.75%	24,252
Sullivan	1,609	69.62%	524	22.67%	163	7.05%	15	0.65%	1,085	46.95%	2,311
Susquehanna	9,330	71.79%	2,830	21.77%	736	5.66%	101	0.78%	6,500	50.02%	12,997
Tioga	7,000	70.54%	2,071	20.87%	798	8.04%	54	0.54%	4,929	49.67%	9,923
Union	5,395	68.20%	1,700	21.49%	757	9.57%	58	0.73%	3,695	46.71%	7,910
Venango	9,643	62.96%	3,595	23.47%	1,991	13.00%	87	0.57%	6,048	39.49%	15,316
Warren	6,760	60.71%	2,301	20.66%	1,975	17.74%	99	0.89%	4,459	40.05%	11,135
Washington	22,825	43.56%	20,050	38.27%	9,113	17.39%	405	0.77%	2,775	5.29%	52,393
Wayne	8,692	70.57%	2,892	23.48%	603	4.90%	129	1.05%	5,800	47.09%	12,316
Westmoreland	44,331	44.54%	32,375	32.53%	22,025	22.13%	804	0.81%	11,956	12.01%	99,535
Wyoming	6,965	74.54%	1,682	18.00%	616	6.59%	81	0.87%	5,283	56.54%	9,344
York	62,657	72.47%	16,825	19.46%	6,103	7.06%	880	1.02%	45,832	53.01%	86,465
Totals	1,736,844	57.42%	938,745	31.03%	315,761	10.44%	33,591	1.11%	798,099	26.39%	3,024,941

Counties that flipped from Democratic to Republican

- Alleghany
- Beaver
- Cambria
- Fayette
- Greene
- Lackawanna
- Lawrence
- Luzerne
- Washington
- Westmoreland

== Notes ==
Partisan clients
