= Porter Hardy Jr. =

American politician

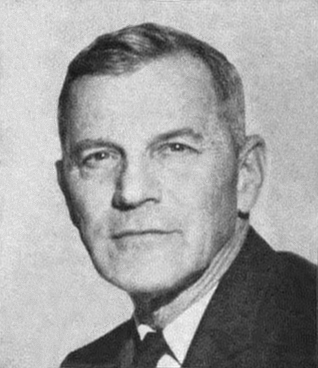

Member of the U.S. House of Representatives from Virginia's 2nd district
- In office January 3, 1947 – January 3, 1969
- Preceded by: Ralph Hunter Daughton
- Succeeded by: G. William Whitehurst

Personal details
- Born: June 1, 1903 Bon Air, Virginia
- Died: April 19, 1995 (aged 91) Virginia Beach, Virginia, U.S.
- Resting place: Virginia Beach, Virginia
- Party: Democratic
- Children: Lynn Yeakel
- Education: Randolph-Macon College (BA); Harvard University (MBA)
- Profession: businessman

Porter Hardy Jr. (June 1, 1903 – April 19, 1995) was a farmer, businessman and Democrat politician who represented Virginia's 2nd congressional district in the United States House of Representatives for more than two decades, maintaining a level of independence from the state-dominant Byrd Organization.

== Early and family life ==
Born in Bon Air, Virginia, Hardy attended public schools and Randolph-Macon Academy in Bedford, Virginia. He graduated from Boykins High School in 1918, and from Randolph-Macon College, Ashland, Virginia, in 1922, then attended the Graduate School of Business Administration at Harvard University in 1923 and 1924.

== Career ==
Hardy worked as an accountant and warehouse manager in New York City and Norfolk, Virginia from 1924 to 1927. He then became a wholesaler of electrical equipment in Salisbury, Maryland from 1927 to 1932, before moving to Churchland, Virginia, in 1932, to farm.

Although the Byrd Organization controlled much of the state, the Congressional District that included the cities of Norfolk, Portsmouth and Suffolk and Norfolk, Nansemond, Suffolk, Isle of Wight and Princess Anne Counties had elected five different congressmen in the previous decade, a national record that Hardy ended by defeating the incumbent in the primary. The incumbent had prevented Hardy's nomination in the 1944 primary. He won election to the Eightieth and ten succeeding Congresses (January 3, 1947 – January 3, 1969) before announcing his retirement after 22 years. Hardy investigated waste in federal operations as chairman of the House Armed Services Sub-committee.

As did Byrd Organization members, Hardy signed the 1956 Southern Manifesto that opposed the desegregation of public schools ordered by the Supreme Court in Brown v. Board of Education. He also voted against the Civil Rights Act of 1964, but unlike Byrd Organization members voted for the Twenty-fourth Amendment to the United States Constitution. After his legislative retirement as the Byrd Organization collapsed, Hardy continued to serve as a director of Dominion Bankshares Corporation and other Virginia financial institutions.

He died April 19, 1995, and was interred at Eastern Shore Chapel Cemetery, in Virginia Beach, Virginia.

== Electoral history ==
- 1946; Hardy was elected to Congress defeating Republican Sidney H. Kelsey, winning 65.66% of the vote.
- 1948; Hardy was re-elected defeating Republican Walter E. Hoffman, Independent Jerry O. Gilliam, and Socialist Sidney Moore, winning 61.15% of the vote.
- 1950; Hardy was re-elected unopposed.
- 1952; Hardy was re-elected unopposed.
- 1954; Hardy was re-elected defeating Republican George V. Credle, winning 74.45% of the vote.
- 1956; Hardy was re-elected defeating Republican William R. Burns, winning 76.43% of the vote.
- 1958; Hardy was re-elected unopposed.
- 1960; Hardy was re-elected defeating Republican Louis B. Fine, winning 75.94% of the vote.
- 1962; Hardy was re-elected defeating Republican Fine, winning 74.96% of the vote.
- 1964; Hardy was re-elected defeating Republican Wayne Lustig and Independent H. Grady Speers, winning 68.73% of the vote.
- 1966; Hardy was re-elected unopposed.

== Sources ==
- United States Congress. "Porter Hardy Jr. (id: H000197)". Biographical Directory of the United States Congress.

U.S. House of Representatives
Preceded by Ralph Hunter Daughton	Member of the U.S. House of Representatives from Virginia's 2nd congressional district 1947–1969	Succeeded by G. William Whitehurst
