= Tom Ridge =

American politician (born 1945)

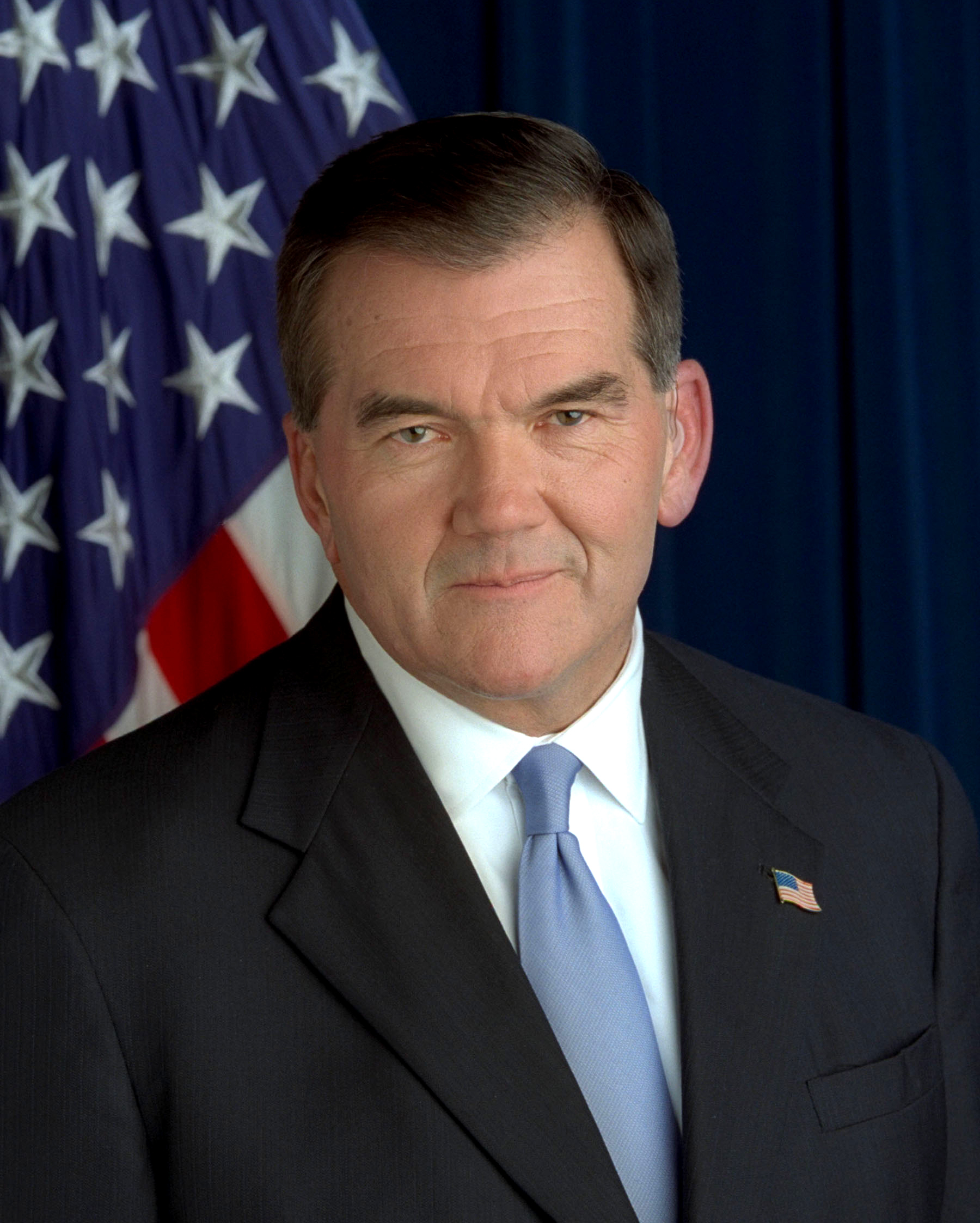
- Official portrait, 2001

1st United States Secretary of Homeland Security
- In office January 24, 2003 – February 1, 2005
- President: George W. Bush
- Deputy: Gordon R. England; James Loy
- Preceded by: Position established
- Succeeded by: Michael Chertoff

1st United States Homeland Security Advisor
- In office October 8, 2001 – January 24, 2003
- President: George W. Bush
- Preceded by: Position established
- Succeeded by: John A. Gordon

43rd Governor of Pennsylvania
- In office January 17, 1995 – October 5, 2001
- Lieutenant: Mark Schweiker
- Preceded by: Bob Casey Sr.
- Succeeded by: Mark Schweiker

Member of the U.S. House of Representatives from Pennsylvania's 21st district
- In office January 3, 1983 – January 3, 1995
- Preceded by: Donald Bailey
- Succeeded by: Phil English

Personal details
- Born: Thomas Joseph Ridge; August 26, 1945 (age 81) Munhall, Pennsylvania, U.S.
- Party: Republican
- Spouse: Michele Ridge (m. 1979)
- Children: 2 (adopted)
- Education: Harvard University (BA); Dickinson School of Law (JD)

Military service
- Allegiance: United States
- Branch/service: United States Army
- Years of service: 1969–1970
- Rank: Staff Sergeant
- Unit: Bravo Company, 1st Battalion, 20th Infantry Regiment, 11th Infantry Brigade, 23rd Infantry Division
- Battles/wars: Vietnam War
- Awards: Bronze Star (with valor); Vietnam Gallantry Cross (with palm)

Thomas Joseph Ridge (born August 26, 1945) is an American politician and author who served in the George W. Bush administration as the assistant to the president for homeland security from 2001 to 2003 and as the United States secretary of homeland security from 2003 to 2005. He was the first person to hold either office. A member of the Republican Party, he previously served in the United States House of Representatives from 1983 to 1995 and as the 43rd governor of Pennsylvania from 1995 to 2001.

Ridge was born in Munhall, Pennsylvania, and raised in veterans' public housing in Erie, Pennsylvania. After graduating from Harvard University with honors, he served in the U.S. Army during the Vietnam War where he was awarded the Bronze Star. He then returned to Pennsylvania and completed his Juris Doctor (J.D.) degree at the Dickinson School of Law, graduating in 1972, and entered private practice.

As assistant district attorney in Erie, Ridge ran for Congress in his district, where he served six terms. He then ran for governor in 1994, despite being little-known outside of northwest Pennsylvania. He won the election, and was reelected in 1998 with the most votes for a Republican governor in Pennsylvania (where Democrats outnumbered Republicans by almost 500,000) in more than half a century. As Governor of Pennsylvania, he is credited for statewide advances in economic development, education, health care and the environment. As of 2026, he is the last Republican to win reelection as Pennsylvania's governor.

Following the September 11, 2001 terrorist attacks, U.S. president George W. Bush named Ridge the first director of the newly created Office of Homeland Security. In January 2003, the Office of Homeland Security became an official Cabinet department, the Department of Homeland Security, and Ridge became the first Secretary of Homeland Security. He served in these roles for Bush's first term as president, then retired and returned to the private sector.

Since reentering the private sector, Ridge has served on the boards of the Home Depot, the Hershey Company and Exelon Corporation and as a senior advisor to Deloitte & Touche and TechRadium. He is also the founder and chairman of Ridge Global, a Washington, D.C.–based security consulting firm. He spent time campaigning with Senator John McCain during his 2008 presidential bid and was believed by some to have been on the short list of potential running mates.

== Early life and education ==
Ridge was born in Munhall, Pennsylvania, in Pittsburgh's Steel Valley, the eldest of three children. His parents were Laura (née Sudimack) and Thomas Regis Ridge, who was a traveling salesman and Navy veteran. Ridge's maternal grandparents were Rusyn immigrants from the former Czechoslovakia (now Slovakia), and his paternal great-grandparents emigrated from Great Britain. He was raised in veterans' public housing in Erie, Pennsylvania. He was educated at St. Andrews Elementary School and Cathedral Preparatory School and did well both academically and in sports. He attended Harvard College, where he paid his way through with construction work, played intramural baseball and football, and graduated with honors in 1967. In 1968, after his first year at the Dickinson School of Law, he was drafted into the United States Army.

== Military service in Vietnam ==
Ridge waived an opportunity for officer training school because it would have required a longer service commitment. In November 1969, Ridge arrived as a sergeant in South Vietnam where he would serve for six months as a staff sergeant with Bravo Company, 1st Battalion, 20th Infantry, 11th Infantry Brigade, 23rd Infantry Division (Americal Division) during the Vietnam War.

In May 1970, a ruptured appendix cut short his tour of duty in Vietnam and he was sent home; his service also aggravated a childhood ear infection which caused him afterwards to have a hearing aid in his left ear.

For his service in Vietnam, Ridge received the Bronze Star with "V" Device, National Defense Service Medal, Vietnam Service Medal, Republic of Vietnam Gallantry Cross Unit Citation with Palm, Republic of Vietnam Campaign Medal, and the Combat Infantryman Badge.

=== Military awards ===

Badge	Combat Infantryman Badge		
1st row	Bronze Star Medal with "V" device		National Defense Service Medal
2nd row	Vietnam Service Medal	Vietnam Gallantry Cross Ribbon with Palm	Vietnam Campaign Medal

== Legal career ==
After returning to Pennsylvania, he completed his Juris Doctor (J.D.) degree at the Dickinson School of Law, graduating in 1972, and entered private practice.

Ridge became assistant district attorney in Erie County, Pennsylvania, in 1980 and prosecuted 86 cases in two years.

== Elected office ==
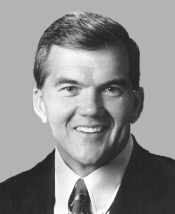
Congressman Ridge during the 104th Congress

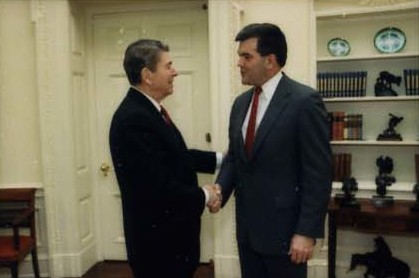
Ridge with President Ronald Reagan in 1988

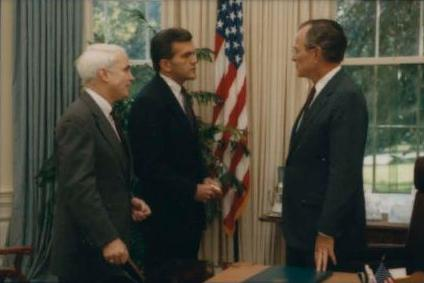
Ridge with President George H. W. Bush and United States senator John McCain in 1990

=== U.S. House of Representatives ===
In 1982, Ridge won a seat in Congress from northwestern Pennsylvania by the margin of only 729 votes. He was then re-elected five times.

=== Governor ===
In 1994, despite being little-known outside of northwest Pennsylvania, Ridge ran for governor. He won the election as a pro-choice Republican. He was reelected in 1998 with 57 percent of the vote in a four-way race. His share of the vote in that election was the highest for a Republican governor in Pennsylvania (where Democrats outnumber Republicans by almost 500,000) in more than half a century.

During his time as governor, Ridge promoted "law and order" policies, supporting a three-strikes law and a faster death penalty process. A death penalty supporter, Ridge signed more than 224 execution warrants – five times the number signed over a 25-year period by the two previous governors – but only three voluntary executions were carried out. On social issues, he opposed same-sex marriage while supporting abortion access, with limits.

Over Ridge's tenure, the commonwealth's budget grew by two to three percent per fiscal year and combined tax reductions totaled over $2 billion. Ridge created and grew a "Rainy Day" Fund balance to over $1 billion to be utilized during an economic downturn or recession.

Ridge pushed for legislation permitting competition among electric utilities and enhanced federal and state support for the Children's Health Insurance Program (CHIP). He separated the commonwealth's environmental regulatory and conservation programs into two new agencies; the Department of Environmental Protection and the Department of Conservation and Natural Resources.

Ridge proposed the creation of public charter schools in Pennsylvania and in establishing alternate schools for disruptive students. He launched new academic standards that established academic expectations for what students were expected to know in different grades. He proposed a school choice demonstration program.

Ridge oversaw a number of e-government projects including renewing drivers' licenses and vehicle registrations to viewing historical documents and library catalogs. The commonwealth's portal won several national awards. One of the nation's first electronic grant systems was put into place at the Pennsylvania Department of Education. He created the Link-to-Learn initiative to increase the effective use of technology in public schools and universities.

Ridge signed two death warrants for African-American radio personality Mumia Abu-Jamal, who was convicted of first degree murder for the killing of police officer Daniel Faulkner.

He served as governor until his resignation in 2001, at which time he became the Director of Homeland Security following the September 11 attacks.

== 2000 presidential election ==
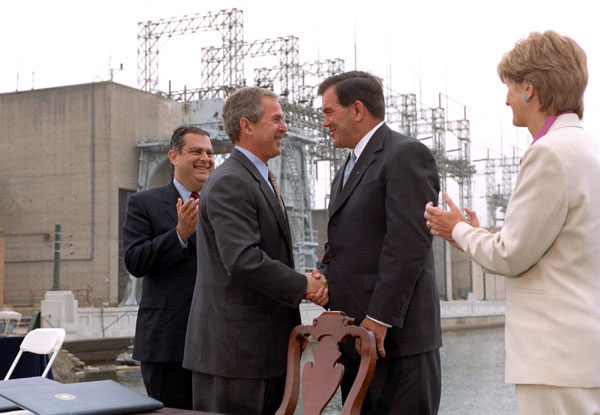
Ridge greeting President George W. Bush in 2001

Ridge was a potential running mate for Bob Dole in 1996, and served as a close advisor to Republican presidential nominee George W. Bush, a close friend from their simultaneous tenures as governors, during the 2000 presidential campaign. In return, Bush named Ridge to his short list for possible running mates, along with New York governor George Pataki, Michigan governor John Engler, Oklahoma governor Frank Keating, former Missouri senator John Danforth, and former American Red Cross president Elizabeth Dole.

== Homeland Security ==
Dick Cheney swears in Ridge as the first Secretary of the Department of Homeland Security in January 2003.

Following the September 11, 2001, terrorist attacks, U.S. president George W. Bush created the Office of Homeland Security within the White House, and named Ridge to head it. The charge to the nation's new director of homeland security was to develop and coordinate a comprehensive national strategy to strengthen the United States against terrorist threats or attacks. Ridge formally resigned as Pennsylvania's governor on October 5, 2001.

In January 2003 and after the passage of the Homeland Security Act of 2002, the Office of Homeland Security split into a Cabinet-level department, the Department of Homeland Security, and the White House Homeland Security Advisory Council. Ridge left the White House and became the first secretary of homeland security. The department's mission "is to (A) prevent terrorist attacks within the United States; (B) reduce the vulnerability of the United States to terrorism; and (C) minimize the damage, and assist in the recovery, from terrorist attacks that do occur within the United States" (From H.R. 5005-8 the Homeland Security Act of 2002). The newly created department was the most comprehensive reorganization of the Federal government since the National Security Act of 1947.

The Department of Homeland Security consolidates 22 agencies and 180,000 employees, unifying once-fragmented Federal functions in a single agency dedicated to protecting America from terrorism. Ridge worked with the employees from combined agencies to strengthen borders, provide for intelligence analysis and infrastructure protection, improve the use of science and technology to counter weapons of mass destruction, and to create a comprehensive response and recovery division.

In January 2004, Ridge was named among others in a lawsuit filed by a Syrian-born Canadian Maher Arar who said he was tortured in Syria after being deported by American authorities.

== Retirement from public office and book ==
On November 30, 2004, Ridge submitted his resignation to the president, saying, "After more than 22 consecutive years of public service, it is time to give personal and family matters a higher priority."

In his book The Test of Our Times: America Under Siege...and How We Can Be Safe Again, Ridge says his resignation was due to an effort by senior Bush administration officials to raise the nation's terror alert level in the days before the 2004 presidential vote.

== Work in the private sector ==
Ridge is the founder and chairman of Ridge Global, an advisory firm in Washington, D.C.

Ridge served on a state-appointed incident review panel that investigated the Virginia Tech shooting.

Ridge also sits on the board of directors of the Atlantic Council.

=== Ridge Policy Group ===
In 2010, Ridge's two former chiefs of staff, Mark Campbell and Mark Holman, opened a lobbying firm after Ridge lent the firm his name. The full-service government affairs firm has offices in Harrisburg, Pennsylvania, and Washington, D.C.

In July 2010, companies seeking to use hydraulic fracturing to extract natural gas from the Marcellus Shale formation engaged Ridge and Ridge Policy Group at $75,000 a month to help them gain support.

=== Board memberships and other corporate associations ===
Ridge has served on a variety of corporate boards of directors and in other roles. In 2005, he was named to the board of Home Depot, with an expected annual compensation of about $100,000. and in the same year was appointed to the board of the RFID company Savi Technology. He was appointed to the board of directors of the Exelon Corporation electric utility in 2006, with starting director compensation of $35,000 annual retainer plus a $1,500 meeting fee or per diem fee and (at the time) $60,000 in annual deferred stock units. In 2006, Ridge was announced as a senior advisor for Deloitte & Touche USA LLP. He was named to serve on the executive board of the Hershey Company in 2007, and was named senior advisor to Texas-based security technology company TechRadium, Inc. in 2008. In 2009, antimicrobial company PURE Bioscience named Ridge, along with former Wisconsin governor Tommy Thompson, to its advisory board. He currently sits on the bipartisan advisory board of States United Democracy Center.

== Political activity ==
=== 2008 presidential election ===
Ridge served as a senior aide to Republican presidential candidate Senator John McCain of Arizona, and was considered by some as a possible running mate for McCain.

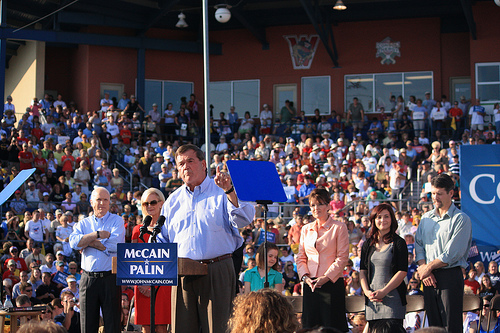
Tom Ridge at rally for John McCain

=== Speculated 2010 Senate candidacy ===
According to Fox News, many Republicans hoped Ridge would run for the United States Senate against the newly turned Democrat Arlen Specter, who stated he would seek re-election in 2010 in the Democratic primary. Already seeking the Republican nomination was former representative Pat Toomey, who narrowly lost to Specter in the Republican primary in 2004. Some Republicans thought Ridge would have a better chance against Specter than would Toomey. A Quinnipiac University Polling Institute poll conducted between April 30, 2009, and May 3, 2009, placed Ridge within three points of Specter in a hypothetical matchup between the two men.

Some Toomey supporters criticized the idea of a Ridge candidacy because, although Ridge was still registered to vote in Pennsylvania, he was actually living in Chevy Chase, Maryland. On May 7, 2009, Ridge announced that he would not be a candidate for the U.S. Senate in 2010.

=== 2012 presidential election ===
In September 2011, Ridge endorsed the campaign of former Utah governor Jon Huntsman in the 2012 election. Mitt Romney announced an endorsement from Ridge on March 14, 2012.

=== Supreme Court brief ===
In 2013, Ridge was a signatory to an amicus curiae brief submitted to the Supreme Court in support of same-sex marriage during the Hollingsworth v. Perry case.

=== Stance on the People's Mujahedin of Iran ===
Ridge spoke at a conference in support of the removal of the People's Mujahedin of Iran (MEK, also PMOI, MKO) from the United States State Department list of Foreign Terrorist Organizations. The group was listed on the State Department list from 1997 until September 2012. The Los Angeles Times reported a senior Clinton administration official as saying inclusion of the People's Mojahedin was intended as a goodwill gesture to Tehran and its newly elected president, Mohammad Khatami. Ridge, along with other former government officials and politicians Ed Rendell, R. James Woolsey, Porter Goss, Louis Freeh, Michael Mukasey, James L. Jones, Rudy Giuliani, and Howard Dean, have spoken in support of the group. Ridge and others wrote an article for the conservative publication National Review stating their position that the group should not be classified as a terrorist organization, raising the point that "The material-support statute doesn’t need revision to accommodate non-existent defects. What it does need – and does not often enough get for fear of offending some Muslim organizations – is rigorous enforcement against accurately designated organizations, of which MEK is not one."

=== 2015 Blue Ribbon Commission ===
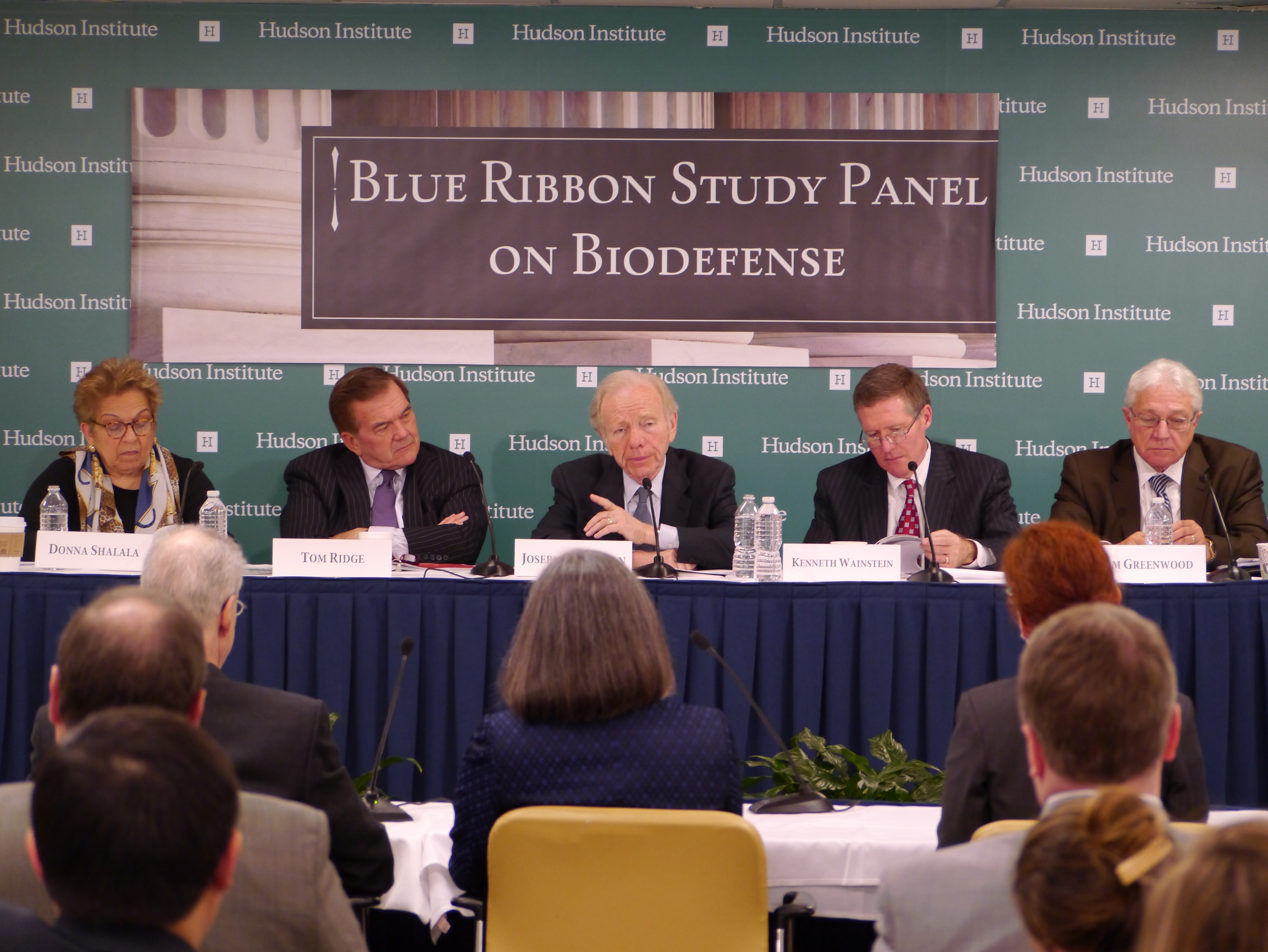
Blue Ribbon Study Panel on Biodefense (Ridge 2nd from left)

In 2015, Ridge served as co-chair of the Blue Ribbon Study Panel on Biodefense, a commission that recommended changes to U.S. policy regarding biodefense. In order to address biological threats facing the nation, the Blue Ribbon Study Panel on Biodefense created a 33-step initiative for the U.S. Government to implement. Tom Ridge headed the organization with former senator Joe Lieberman, and the Study Panel assembled in Washington, D.C., for four meetings concerning current biodefense programs. The Study Panel concluded that the federal government had little to no defense mechanisms in case of a biological event. The Study Panel's final report, The National Blueprint for Biodefense, proposes a string of solutions and recommendations for the U.S. Government to take, including items such as giving the vice president authority over biodefense responsibilities and merging the entire biodefense budget. These solutions represent the Panel's call to action in order to increase awareness and activity for pandemic related issues.

=== 2016 presidential election ===
In 2016, Ridge endorsed Jeb Bush and subsequently John Kasich after Bush's withdrawal from the 2016 Republican presidential primaries. Ridge stated he would not endorse Donald Trump, following Trump becoming the presumptive nominee, or Hillary Clinton in the general election.

=== Criticisms of President Trump ===
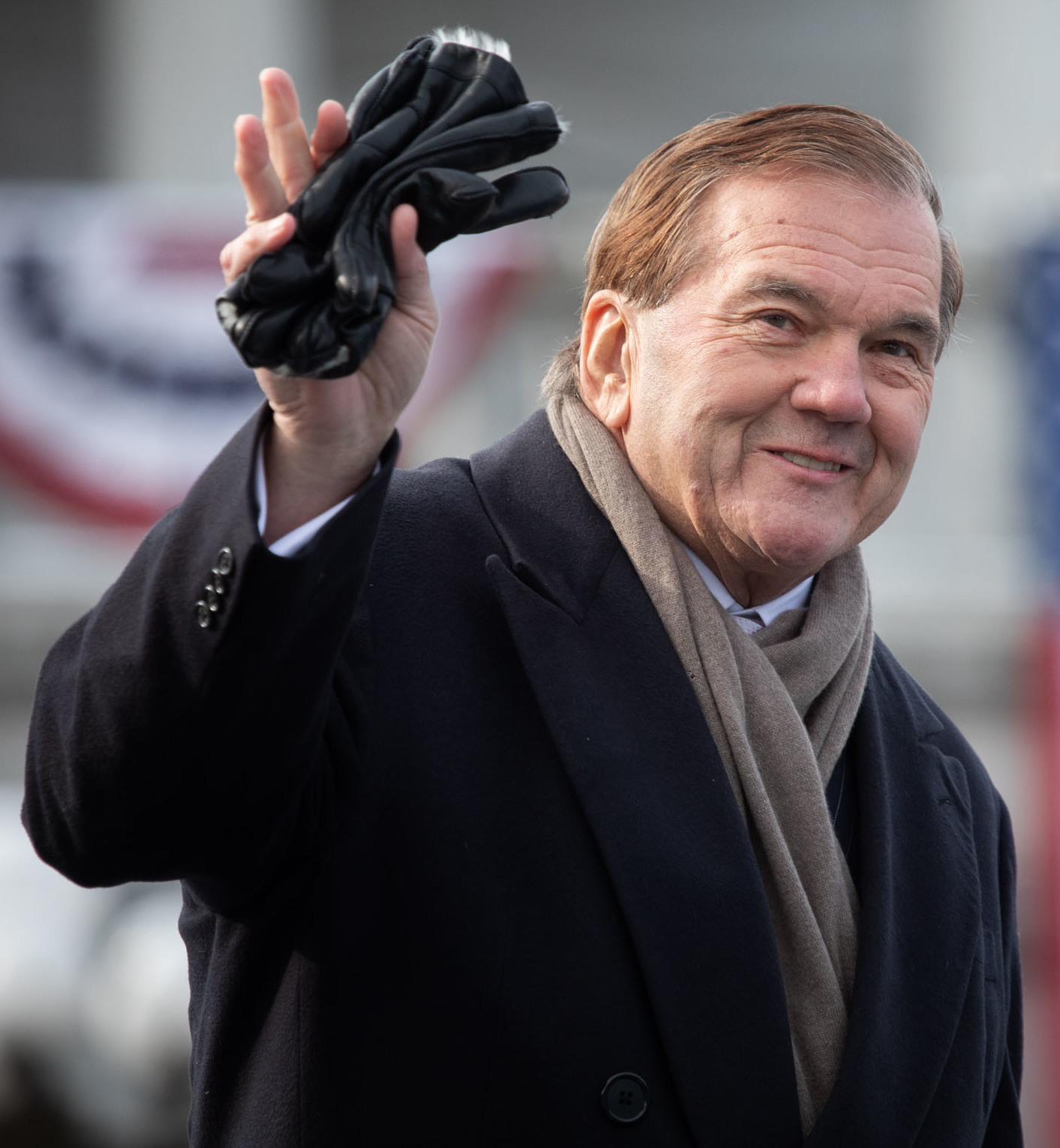
Ridge at the inauguration of Governor Tom Wolf in 2019

In July 2020, Ridge criticized President Donald Trump for saying in June that vote-by-mail leads to widespread voter fraud, responding that it is not a threat and that voters need a safe way to cast a ballot in the 2020 election, amid the COVID-19 pandemic. Ridge also said that it was "sad" that the president wants to quash the legitimacy of the election. In response to Ridge's comments, the RNC said lawsuits by Democrats to strip ballot safeguards are an attempt to delegitimize the election.

Also in July 2020, Ridge slammed his former department for sending in federal agents to detain rioters allegedly committing federal crimes in Portland, Oregon, after more than 50 days of protests and riots there. He also said, during an interview with radio host Michael Smerconish, that it would be a "cold day in hell" before he "would consent to an uninvited, unilateral intervention" in one of his cities in Pennsylvania. The White House cited federal law to support this use of federal law enforcement. Trump later slammed Ridge on Twitter, calling him "a failed RINO" and saying he "loved watching pathetic Never Trumpers squirm!".

==== VoteSafe ====
Ridge is a co-chair of VoteSafe, a bipartisan group that promotes safe voting by mail and in person.

=== 2020 presidential election ===
In September 2020, Ridge endorsed former vice president Joe Biden for president in a Philadelphia Inquirer op-ed. On November 6, 2020, he confirmed to CNN that it was the first time he ever voted for a Democratic presidential candidate.

Ridge, along with more than 100 Republican former national security officials, signed a letter in November that stated that the delay of the presidential transition imperiled the security of the nation. The 9/11 Commission finding that the shortened transition to the administration of George W. Bush during the disputed 2000 presidential election "hampered the new administration in identifying, recruiting, clearing, and obtaining Senate confirmation of key appointees" was mentioned in the statement.

In August 2022, Ridge described the January 6 United States Capitol attack as "conduct you’d see in a Third World country, not in the United States of America" and described current politics in America as "distressing", "personal, vengeful, [and] mean-spirited."

=== 2022 Senate election ===
In 2022, Ridge endorsed fellow Republican Mehmet Oz in the 2022 United States Senate election in Pennsylvania.

== Memoir ==
Tom Ridge's book The Test of Our Times was published in September 2009. Written with Larry Bloom, it focuses on Ridge's time as the head of the Department of Homeland Security. He explains the challenges and decision-making processes of the newly formed department, and gives his own views as to the future of the security of the United States of America. The book further discusses

the infighting he saw that frustrated his attempts to build a smooth-running department. Among the headlines promoted by publisher Thomas Dunne Books: Ridge was never invited to sit in on National Security Council meetings; was 'blindsided' by the FBI in morning Oval Office meetings because the agency withheld critical information from him; found his urgings to block Michael Brown from being named head of the emergency agency blamed for the Hurricane Katrina disaster ignored; and was pushed to raise the security alert on the eve of President Bush's re-election, something he saw as politically motivated and worth resigning over.

Ridge wrote in his memoir that then-secretary of defense Donald Rumsfeld and then-attorney general John Ashcroft pressured him to raise the terror alert level, running up to the 2004 elections, because of a pre-election message critical of President Bush from Osama Bin Laden.

== Recognition ==
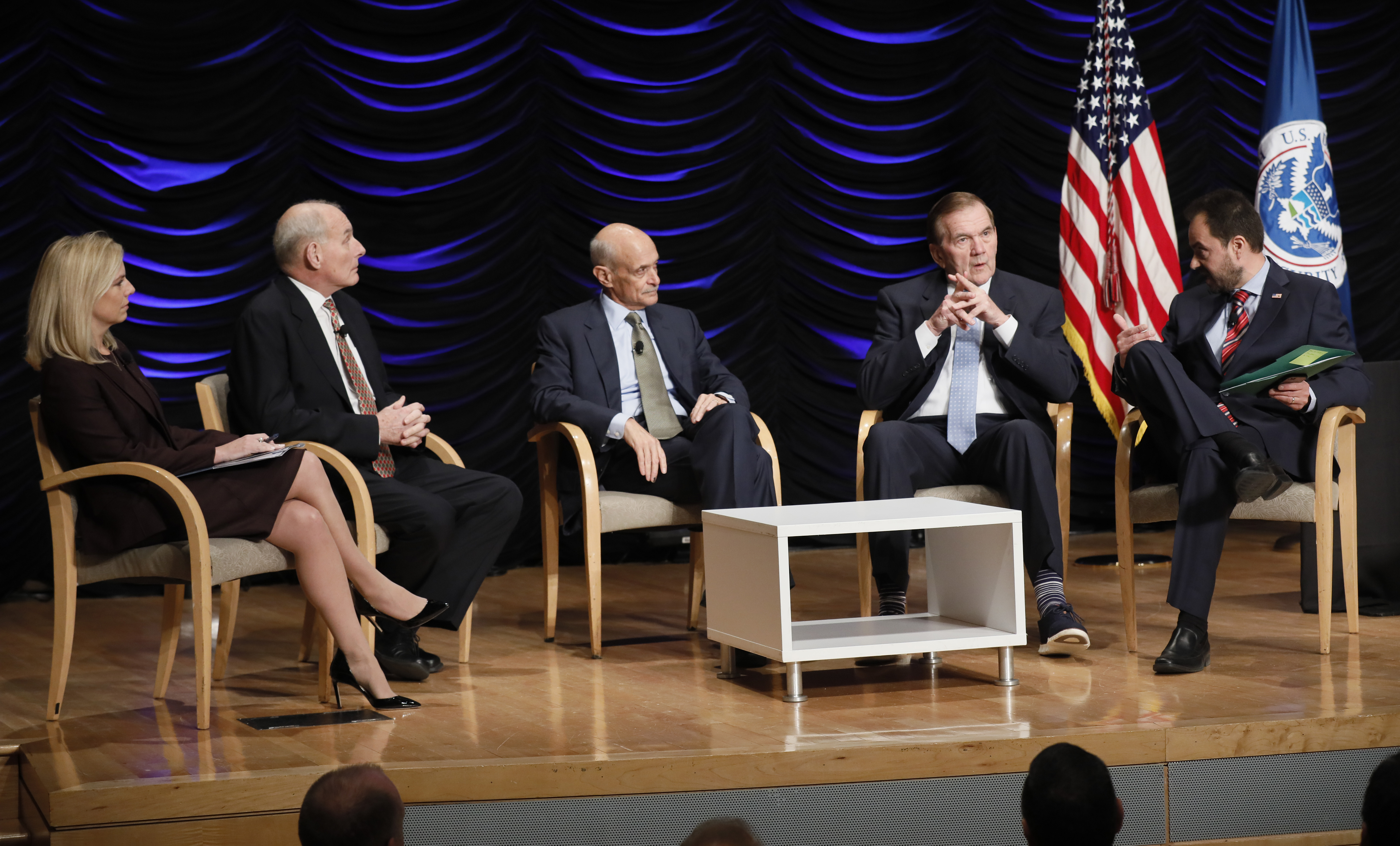
Ridge with Kirstjen Nielsen, John Kelly, and Michael Chertoff in 2018

- Awarded the Woodrow Wilson Award by the Woodrow Wilson International Center for Scholars.
- Erie International Airport was co-named Tom Ridge Field in honor of Ridge.
- The Tom Ridge Environmental Center at Presque Isle State Park in Erie, Pennsylvania, is named after the former governor. Ridge was instrumental in securing funds for the center.
- Ridge's picture hangs in the moot court room at the Penn State Dickinson School of Law in Carlisle, Pennsylvania.
- Presque Isle Downs in Erie, Pennsylvania, runs the $100,000 Tom Ridge Stakes every meet.
- Mercyhurst University named its Tom Ridge College of Intelligence Studies and Applied Science after the first U.S. Secretary of Homeland Security.

== Personal life ==
Tom's wife, Michele Ridge, is the former executive director of the Erie County Library System. Married since 1979, they have two children: Lesley and Tommy.

Ridge was hospitalized in critical condition in Texas after a cardiac event on November 16, 2017.

On June 16, 2021, Ridge suffered a stroke while at his home in Bethesda, Maryland. He was hospitalized and underwent a successful procedure to remove a blood clot. Discharged in late June, Ridge began rehabilitation therapy in the Washington, D.C., area.

== Gubernatorial electoral history ==
1994 Pennsylvania Gubernatorial Election
Party	Candidate	Votes	%
Republican	Tom Ridge	1,627,976	45.40%
Democratic	Mark Singel	1,430,099	39.88%
Constitution	Peg Luksik	460,269	12.84%
Libertarian	Patrick Fallon	33,602	0.94%
Reform	Tom Holloway	33,235	0.93%
Write-in		345	0.01%
Total votes		3,585,526	100.00%
Turnout			60.98%
Republican gain from Democratic			

1998 Pennsylvania gubernatorial election
Party	Candidate	Votes	%
Republican	Tom Ridge (incumbent)	1,736,844	57.42%
Democratic	Ivan Itkin	938,745	31.03%
Constitution	Peg Luksik	315,761	10.43%
Libertarian	Ken Krawchuk	33,591	1.11%
Write-in		281	0.01%
Total votes		3,025,022	100.00%
Turnout			41.67%
Republican hold			

U.S. House of Representatives
Preceded by Donald Bailey	Member of the U.S. House of Representatives from Pennsylvania's 21st congressional district 1983–1995	Succeeded by Phil English
Party political offices
Preceded by Barbara Hafer	Republican nominee for Governor of Pennsylvania; 1994, 1998	Succeeded by Michael Fisher
Preceded by Jim Gilmore	Chair of the Republican Governors Association; 2001	Succeeded by John G. Rowland
Political offices
Preceded by Robert Casey	Governor of Pennsylvania; 1995–2001	Succeeded by Mark Schweiker
New office	United States Homeland Security Advisor; 2001–2003	Succeeded by John Gordon
New office	United States Secretary of Homeland Security; 2003–2005	Succeeded by James Loy; Acting
U.S. order of precedence (ceremonial)
Preceded by Tommy Thompson as Former U.S. Cabinet Member	Order of precedence of the United States as Former U.S. Cabinet Member	Succeeded by John W. Snow as Former U.S. Cabinet Member
