= Lauch Faircloth =

American politician (1928–2023)

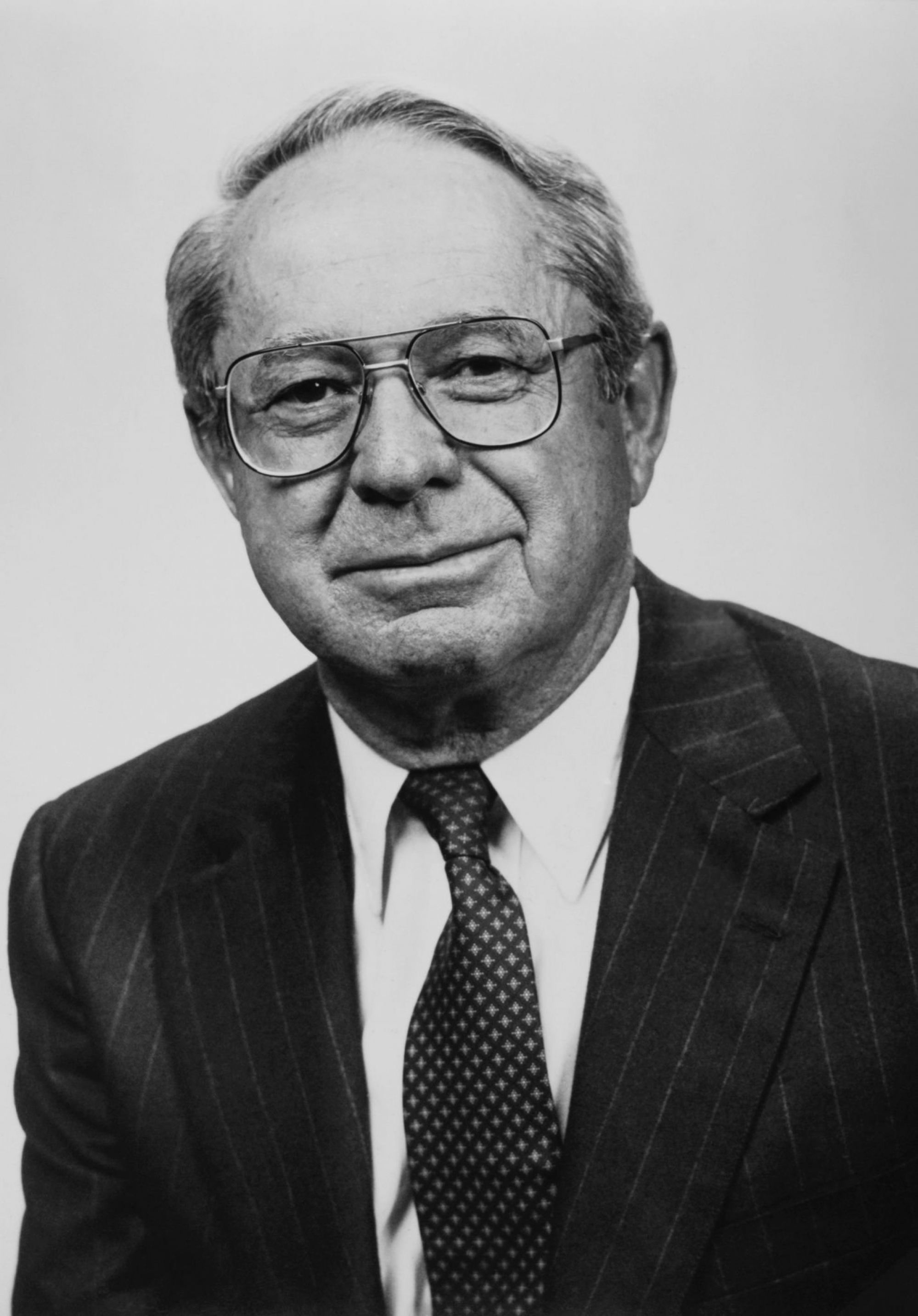
- Official portrait, 1993

United States Senator from North Carolina
- In office January 5, 1993 – January 3, 1999
- Preceded by: Terry Sanford
- Succeeded by: John Edwards

North Carolina Secretary of Commerce
- In office January 10, 1977 – June 16, 1983
- Governor: Jim Hunt
- Preceded by: Donald Beason
- Succeeded by: Howard Haworth

North Carolina Secretary of Transportation and Highway Safety (Note: Until 1971, the office was known as the North Carolina Highway Commission. In 1979 the term "Highway Safety" was dropped when the North Carolina State Highway Patrol (NCSHP) was transferred to the North Carolina Department of Crime Control and Public Safety.)
- In office February 7, 1969 – January 5, 1973
- Governor: Robert W. Scott
- Preceded by: Joe Hunt Jr.

Personal details
- Born: Duncan McLauchlin Faircloth; January 14, 1928 Sampson County, North Carolina, U.S.
- Died: September 14, 2023 (aged 95) Clinton, North Carolina, U.S.
- Resting place: Springvale Cemetery, Clinton, North Carolina
- Party: Democratic (before 1991); Republican (1991–2023)
- Spouse(s): Lady Lynn Talton (m. 1955, divorced) Nancy Bryan Faircloth (m. 1967; div. 1986)
- Children: 1

Military service
- Allegiance: United States
- Branch/service: United States Army
- Years of service: 1954–1955

Duncan McLauchlin "Lauch" (Note: Pronounced "Lock".) Faircloth (January 14, 1928 – September 14, 2023) was an American politician from North Carolina who served as a Republican member of the United States Senate for one term from 1993 to 1999. He was a member of the Democratic Party for most of his career in North Carolina politics until he joined the Republican Party in 1991.

Faircloth began his career as a political consultant to Senator W. Kerr Scott and Governor Terry Sanford. He was appointed to the state highway commission during Sanford's tenure and served as its chairman from 1969 to 1973. He then served as North Carolina Secretary of Commerce before unsuccessfully running for governor in 1984. In 1991, Faircloth switched parties and became a Republican. He won the Republican nomination for the 1992 U.S. Senate election and defeated incumbent Senator Terry Sanford, his former boss, in the general election.

As a U.S. senator, Faircloth staunchly criticized President Bill Clinton and was a prominent figure in the Senate Whitewater investigations. He was also critical of first lady Hillary Clinton and called on her to testify in front of Congress. In 1997, Faircloth came to national attention after he stripped Washington, D.C. mayor Marion Barry of his powers to deal with a large deficit. His decision angered Barry and led to D.C. residents marching to North Carolina to protest. Although his political standing was damaged, Faircloth attempted to seek a second term in 1998, losing to Democrat John Edwards in the general election.

== Early life ==
Born on January 14, 1928, in Sampson County, North Carolina, Faircloth was the youngest of four sons born to James and Mary Faircloth; James owned a 2,500-acre cotton farm, which Lauch inherited after James' death. He attended Roseboro High School and graduated in 1945. He attended High Point University but dropped out in his freshman year after his father suffered a stroke.

In 1950, Faircloth purchased 1,000 acres of land in Sampson County, which he turned into a prominent cattle and hog farm. He also engaged in business ventures such as construction and auto dealerships. One impetus for his political activism was his disagreement with the increasing regulations targeting large hog farming operations such as his, fueled by an environmentalist and populist backlash.

== Early political career ==
Faircloth began his career as a Democrat. He worked on W. Kerr Scott's successful 1948 gubernatorial campaign and his 1954 U.S. Senate campaign. Scott rewarded Faircloth by helping him get out of service in the Korean War via a hardship discharge in 1955. In 1960, Faircloth worked on Terry Sanford's successful gubernatorial bid, and afterwards Sanford rewarded Faircloth with an appointment to the state highway commission, on which he served from 1961 to 1965. After helping Robert W. Scott in his bid for the governorship in 1968, Scott named Faircloth chairman of the commission, replacing Joe Hunt Jr., which he served as from 1969 to 1973.

When Jim Hunt was elected governor in 1976, he selected Faircloth serve as Secretary of Commerce. As Commerce Secretary, he was paid $32,580 a year. Manufacturing jobs in North Carolina grew 8.4 percent under Faircloth, the third highest in the southeast. The weekly wage increased from $170 when he took office to $297 when he left, which was virtually unchanged from national wages.

=== 1984 gubernatorial campaign ===
Faircloth, aspiring to the governor's office himself, resigned as Commerce Secretary in June 1983. On July 25, he announced his candidacy for the Democratic nomination for the 1984 gubernatorial election. While flying to a campaign stop on August 22, 1983, the small twin-engine plane he was aboard crashed into the Catawba River. According to one passenger, Faircloth forced the plane's door open and helped all the occupants escape moments before the plane exploded. After the crash, Faircloth was transferred to Marion General Hospital for minor burns to his right hand.

In December 1983, Faircloth was endorsed by Terry Sanford, a former governor and the then-president of Duke University who had appointed Faircloth to the state highway commission 20 years prior. Sanford said that Faircloth was "an old and trusted friend" and "the best qualified candidate we have in North Carolina". Faircloth was defeated in the 1984 primary by Rufus Edmisten, who lost the general election to congressman James G. Martin. Official Board of Elections reports showed that Faircloth spent $2,100,605.70 on his campaign.

=== Later activities ===
Faircloth was considered a potential candidate for the Senate seat being vacated by Senator John Porter East in 1986. He initially declined, but in November 1985 he said he was reconsidering his decision and launched a campaign committee. But in January 1986, he announced he would not run after Sanford entered the race; Sanford would go on to win the election. Afterward, Faircloth grew close with Republican Senator Jesse Helms and supported Helms' 1990 reelection campaign. On February 14, 1991, Faircloth switched his party registration to Republican, saying that Democrats had become "too liberal" and hinted at a potential run for the U.S. Senate in 1992, vying to face former ally Terry Sanford in the election.

== U.S. Senate ==
In April 1991, Faircloth announced he would run for the Republican Party nomination for the 1992 U.S. Senate election. He enjoyed the support of Senator Helms's political organization, the National Congressional Club, and defeated Charlotte mayor Sue Myrick and former congressman Walter E. Johnston III in the primary. Sanford, the incumbent Senator, had helped Faircloth raise money for his failed gubernatorial bid in 1984, but provoked Faircloth's anger two years later when Sanford allegedly denigrated Faircloth's earlier bid for the Senate with alleged comments dismissing Faircloth's chances in a statewide contest against him.

A year prior to the election, Sanford voted against authorizing military force in the Gulf War, which damaged his political standing. Faircloth attacked Sanford as a tax-and-spend liberal, and despite a mediocre performance in a televised debate that September, Faircloth won the seat by a vote of 1,297,892 (50%) to 1,194,015 (46%).

=== 103rd Congress ===
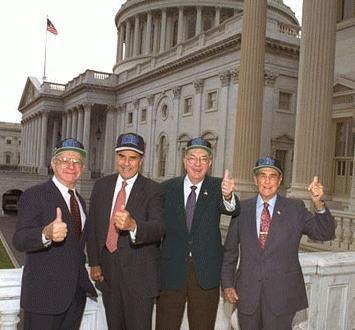
Faircloth along with Senators Bob Dole, Jesse Helms, and Strom Thurmond show their enthusiasm for the Carolinas' new football team, the Carolina Panthers

Faircloth was sworn in as North Carolina's junior U.S. Senator on January 5, 1993. He joked that he wanted to be known as the conservative senator from North Carolina; in comparison to the state's other seat held by the arch-conservative Helms.

In his first two weeks in the Senate, Faircloth was appointed to serve on the United States Senate Committee on Environment and Public Works, the United States Senate Committee on Banking, Housing, and Urban Affairs, and the United States Senate Committee on Armed Services. While on the Armed Service Committee, he opposed the inclusion of homosexuals in the military and claimed the number of AIDS-infected people in the military would only increase if it were to happen. He opposed the Clinton administration's "don't ask, don't tell" policy and said it was a result of President Bill Clinton's lack of military experience. That remark was condemned by Colin Powell, the chairman of the Joint Chiefs of Staff, who said that, "it is unfair to single out the president in this regard".

On the Environment and Public Works Committee, Faircloth sought to weaken anti-pollution measures regulating farms. He introduced a measure that would have lowered fines issued to farms that have polluted wetlands and proposed another measure that would have stopped the flow of federal money to environmental monitors. The committee did not vote on either measure. In 1994, the committee adopted a third measure by Faircloth – legislation that would have made it more difficult for farmers suspected of polluting to be taken to court – but it did not become law. Some claimed there was a conflict of interest in Faircloth's policy proposals, given that he was a farmer, but he claimed he was working to benefit all farmers and not just himself.

In January 1994, Faircloth was among eight Republican senators to call for a congressional inquiry into the role President Bill Clinton had in the Whitewater controversy. In February, he was the lone Senator on the Senate Banking Committee to vote against approving Ricki Tigert as head of the Federal Deposit Insurance Corporation. He argued that Tigert, who was appointed by Clinton, was not going to help uncover information in the investigation. Later that year, The Wall Street Journal praised Faircloth's aggressive efforts to uncover information. In June 1994, he proposed amending the House and Community Development Act to include a work-for-rent requirement, but it was voted down by Senate Democrats. Senator Carol Moseley Braun of Illinois argued that his plan was "dictatorial", and branded Faircloth as a communist.

Faircloth was often criticized for accepting thousands of dollars from several political action committees, despite having criticized them during his 1992 Senate campaign.

=== 104th Congress ===
When the 104th United States Congress convened in January 1995, Faircloth was named chairman of the United States Senate Environment Subcommittee on Clean Air, Climate and Nuclear Safety and the United States Senate Banking Subcommittee on Housing, Transportation, and Community Development. In May, Faircloth and U.S. Senator John Warner of Virginia proposed implementing Interstate 73's entry into South Carolina, but the proposal angered U.S. Senator Strom Thurmond of South Carolina, who effectively killed the deal after calling for a session in the United States Senate Committee on Environment and Public Works. In September 1995, Faircloth was the lone Republican Senator to join eleven Senate Democratics to vote against a landmark welfare spending bill, calling it a "pot of Pablum". In January 1996, Faircloth earned the Taxpayers' Friend Award from the bipartisan National Taxpayers Union.

In April 1995, Faircloth accused the Clinton administration of pushing out Republican Sheila Bair as chair of the Commodity Futures Trading Commission (CFTC) to protect first lady Hillary Clinton's trading profits. In response, the White House denounced his accusation as "a baseless and irresponsible charge". When the United States Senate Whitewater Committee was established in May 1995, Faircloth sought to subpoena first lady Hillary Clinton. In a letter to the CFTC, Faircloth asked for records involving Clinton from 1978 to 1980. He called on Clinton to testify in front of Congress. In 1996, Faircloth delayed the nomination of Brooksley Born to chair the CFTC, demanding that he receive written assurances that would recuse Born from any investigations involving Hillary Clinton and Whitewater.

In 1996, Faircloth delayed the nomination of Susan Oki Mollway to the United States District Court for the District of Hawaii, arguing that she had "very, very liberal ideas" and raised questions over her affiliation with the American Civil Liberties Union. The delay led to Mollway having to wait over two years to be confirmed in the post. Hawaii's senior Senator Daniel Inouye was critical of the delay.

=== 105th Congress ===
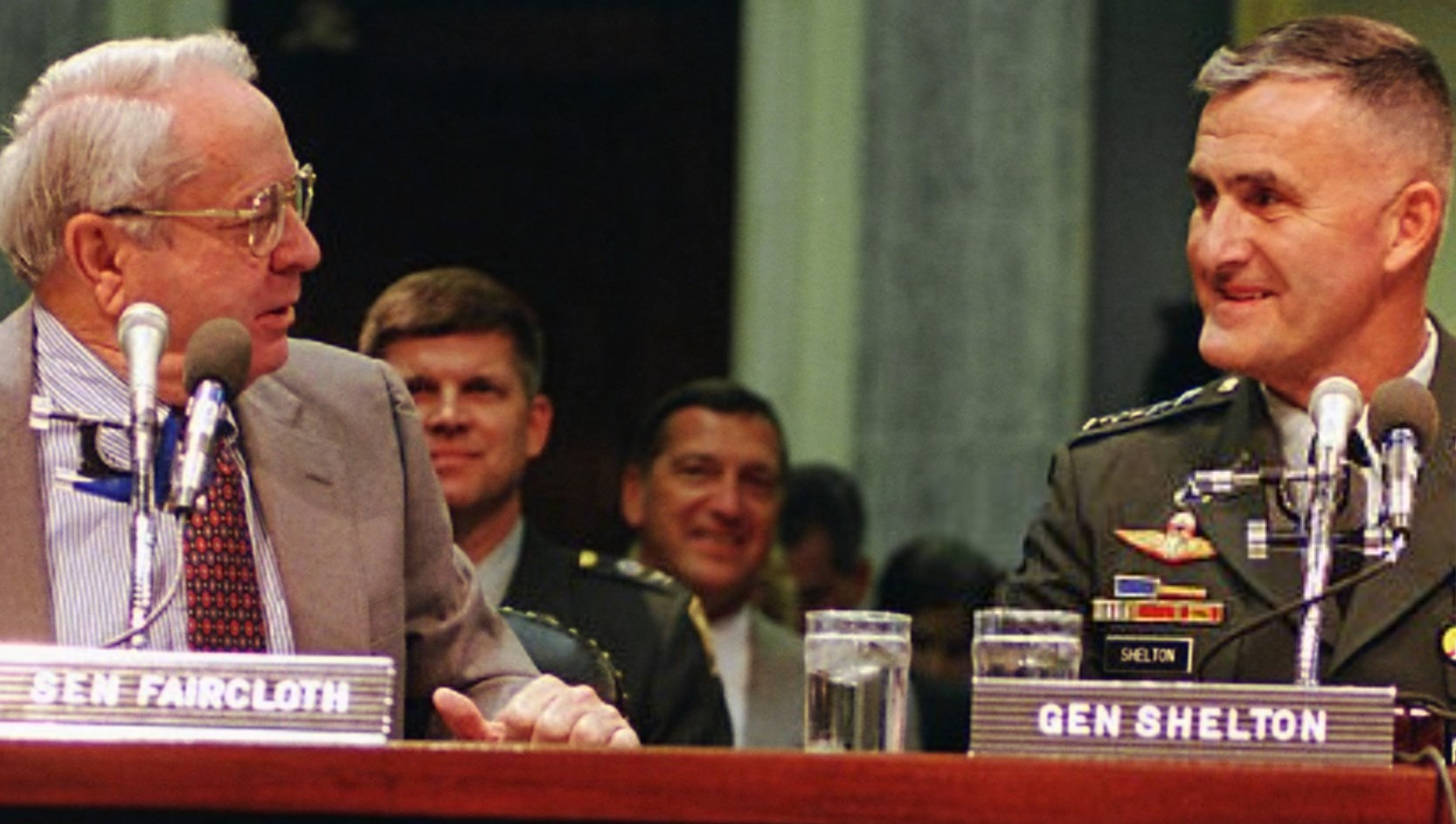
Faircloth and General Hugh Shelton during Shelton's nomination as chairman of the Joint Chiefs of Staff

In September 1997, Faircloth voted to eliminate funding for the National Endowment for the Arts, although it failed with 77 Senators voting against the proposal.

In 1997, Faircloth, then-chair of the Appropriations Subcommittee on the District of Columbia, stripped Washington, D.C. mayor Marion Barry of his authority to deal with a large deficit, handing it to a newly established District of Columbia Financial Control Board, and placing several city agencies into a receivership. The move angered Barry, who called it a "rape of democracy". In response, a crowd of around 600 protesters, 400 of whom marched from D.C., surrounded Faircloth's home in protest at his decision, although he was not home.

In April 1998, Henry Woods, a United States federal judge from Arkansas, alleged to The Charlotte Observer that in 1995 an aide to Faircloth came to him and asked for Woods' financial disclosures. The request was granted two weeks before Woods was to rule on whether or not Ken Starr had jurisdiction to prosecute key Whitewater figures. Woods said that he considered the request to be "a crude attempt to intimidate me", and called on the United States Department of Justice to investigate. Around this time Faircloth sponsored an amendment to the Housing Act of 1937 to put a cap on the number of public housing units that are allowed to be operated on a federal level. In a cartoon report on public housing in America in The Nation, cartoonist Eric Orner described Faircloth as "an otherwise forgettable lackey of Jesse Helms" and attributed his motivation for public housing limits to racism.

Official Senate records showed that between January 1993 and June 1998, Faircloth missed 68 out of 2,122 roll-call votes.

==== 1998 reelection campaign ====
Faircloth ran for reelection in 1998. He defeated Leonard Plyler and Steve Franks in the Republican primary and faced political newcomer, Democrat John Edwards, in the general election. In an August 1998 poll by Mason-Dixon Polling & Strategy, Faircloth's approval rating among voters was 50 percent, with 44 percent disapproving. Despite originally being the marginal favorite, Faircloth lost his seat to Edwards by a vote of 1,029,237 (51%) to 945,943 (47%). In conceding to Edwards, Faircloth admitted to his supporters, "I feel that I let you down...because we should have won." Afterwards, Barry said Faircloth had been "so busy picking on me and the residents of Washington, D.C. that he neglected his constituents in North Carolina. Now he can go back and deal with the pigs. Goodbye, Faircloth."

== Post-Senate career ==
After leaving the Senate, Faircloth moved back to his home in Clinton, North Carolina. When Jesse Helms announced he would retire from the Senate after the 2002 election, Faircloth considered entering the race to replace him. He announced in September 2001 that he would not run.

== Personal life ==
Faircloth married and divorced Lady Lynn Talton, before marrying Nancy Bryan Faircloth in 1967, with whom he had one daughter. He divorced Bryan in 1986.

== Death ==
Faircloth died at his home from natural causes on September 14, 2023, at age 95. He is interred at Springvale Cemetery in Clinton.

== Electoral history ==
North Carolina Senator (Class III) results: 1992–1998
| Year | Democrat | Votes | Pct | Republican | Votes | Pct | 3rd party | Party | Votes | Pct | |
|---|---|---|---|---|---|---|---|---|---|---|---|
| 1992 | Terry Sanford (incumbent) | 1,194,015 | 46% | Lauch Faircloth | 1,297,892 | 50% | Bobby Yates Emory | Libertarian | 85,948 | 3% | * |
| 1998 | John Edwards | 1,029,237 | 51% | Lauch Faircloth (incumbent) | 945,943 | 47% | Barbara Howe | Libertarian | 36,963 | 2% | |

• Write-in and minor candidate notes: in 1992, Bruce Kimball received 23 votes and Mary Ann Zakutney received 13 votes.

== Notes ==
Party political offices
| Preceded by Jim Broyhill | Republican nominee for U.S. Senator from North Carolina (Class 3); 1992, 1998 | Succeeded by Richard Burr |
U.S. Senate
| Preceded by Terry Sanford | U.S. Senator (Class 3) from North Carolina; 1993–1999; Served alongside: Jesse Helms | Succeeded by John Edwards |
