= Four Trials =

2003 book by John Edwards and John Auchard

Cover of the hardcover edition.

Four Trials is a book by former U.S. Senator John Edwards of North Carolina and his co-writer, John Auchard. The book was published by Simon & Schuster in December 2003, before Edwards unsuccessfully ran for the Democratic Party presidential nomination and, later, vice president on the Democratic Party ticket with fellow Senator John Kerry of Massachusetts in the 2004 presidential election.

The book is autobiographical in nature and relates the story of four civil trials where Edwards acted as an attorney for people seeking damages (petitioners) against large institutions and insurance companies (respondents). Interspersing the stories of each trial are remembrances from Edwards's childhood, time at the University of North Carolina School of Law, and meeting his wife, Elizabeth Anania Edwards. Edwards also wrote about his children (including Wade, his teenage son who died in a car accident).

The four trials are covered in four chapters: "E.G." (an alcoholic who was treated by an aggressive aversion therapy that caused coma and brain damage), "Jennifer" (a woman whose child had serious injuries because her obstetrician didn't perform a Cesarean section), "Josh" (a young child whose parents were killed in a car crash by a speeding truck driver who was paid by the number of miles he drove), and Valerie Lakey (a girl, age five, who was seriously injured by a swimming pool drain due to a faulty design).
