= 1992 United States Senate election in North Carolina =

- November 3, 1992
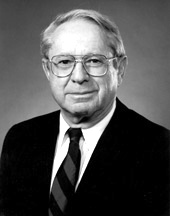

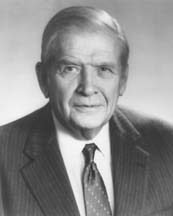
| Nominee | Lauch Faircloth | Terry Sanford |
| Party | Republican | Democratic |
| Popular vote | 1,297,892 | 1,194,015 |
| Percentage | 50.35% | 46.32% |
- County results Faircloth: 40–50% 50–60% 60–70% 70–80% Sanford: 40–50% 50–60% 60–70% 70–80% Tie: 40–50%
U.S. senator before election
Terry Sanford
Democratic
Elected U.S. Senator
Lauch Faircloth
Republican

The 1992 United States Senate election in North Carolina was held on November 3, 1992 as part of the nationwide elections to the Senate. Incumbent Democrat Terry Sanford lost re-election for a second term to Republican Lauch Faircloth, the former North Carolina Secretary of Commerce. This was the third election in a row where the incumbent was defeated.

== Background ==
Eventual victor Lauch Faircloth had formerly been an ally of incumbent Terry Sanford. Although Sanford had helped Faircloth raise money for his failed gubernatorial bid in 1984, he angered Faircloth two years later when he allegedly dismissed Faircloth's chances in a statewide contest if the two ran against each other for the Democratic nomination for the Senate. Faircloth withdrew from the 1986 race after Sanford "blindsided" him by announcing his candidacy.

== Party primaries ==
=== Democratic ===
Incumbent Senator Terry Sanford was unopposed for the Democratic nomination.

=== Republican ===
In 1990, after 40 years as a Democrat, Faircloth switched his party registration and began preparations to seek the Republican Senate nomination in 1992. Enjoying the support of Senator Jesse Helms's political organization, Faircloth defeated Charlotte mayor Sue Myrick and former congressman Walter E. Johnston, III in the primary.

Republican primary results
| Party | Candidate | Votes | % |
|---|---|---|---|
| Republican | Lauch Faircloth | 129,159 | 47.74% |
| Republican | Sue Myrick | 81,801 | 30.23% |
| Republican | Eugene Johnston | 46,112 | 17.04% |
| Republican | Larry Harrington | 13,496 | 4.99% |
| Total votes | | 270,568 | 100.00% |

== General election ==
=== Candidates ===
- Bobby Yates Emory (L)
- Lauch Faircloth (R), former State Secretary of Commerce under Governor Jim Hunt
- Terry Sanford (D), incumbent U.S. Senator

Faircloth attacked Sanford as a tax-and-spend liberal, and despite a poor performance in a September televised debate, Faircloth won the seat by a 103,877-vote margin. Sanford may have been weakened by his unpopular vote against authorizing military force in the Persian Gulf War, and he suffered health problems in the summer of 1992.

=== Results ===
1992 United States Senate election in North Carolina
| Party | Candidate | Votes | % |
|---|---|---|---|
| Republican | Lauch Faircloth | 1,297,892 | 50.35% |
| Democratic | Terry Sanford (incumbent) | 1,194,015 | 46.32% |
| Libertarian | Bobby Yates Emory | 85,948 | 3.33% |
| Total votes | | 2,577,855 | 100.00% |
| Republican gain from Democratic | | | |

== See also ==
- 1992 United States Senate elections
