= Robert Mihaly =

American architect

- Born: Robert Aaron Mihaly; January 8, 1967 (age 59); Akron, Ohio, U.S.
- Known for: Castle Mont Rouge; Conceptual art Sculpture; Painting
- Patrons: Duke University, East Carolina University, United States Postal Service

Robert Aaron Mihaly (born January 8, 1967) is an American stone sculptor, conceptual artist, and painter.

== Early life ==
Mihaly was born in Akron, Ohio. Largely self-educated, he dropped out of Kent State University and moved to North Carolina.

== Career ==
At the age of 21, he was awarded $10,000 in a national college entrepreneur contest. His business plan to design and sell artistic architectural ornaments was selected from 600 other proposals.

In 1996–97, Mihaly was the Artist in Residence at Washington National Cathedral, during which Mihaly attempted to transform a 24,000-pound (11,000 kg) Vermont marble block into an angel. The cathedral came to see the stone and scaffolding as an eyesore and safety hazard, and removed the structure, leaving Mihaly unable to work. Mihaly unsuccessfully sued the cathedral in small-claims court for breach of contract.

In 2002, Duke University commissioned Mihaly for the first gargoyles at Duke since the construction of the Gothic-styled West Campus, to honor Aubrey and Kathleen McClendon, a couple who gave $5.5 million for a new dorm. The Gothic west campus has more than 100 gargoyles perched upon buildings, but Mihaly's two new sculptures did not entertain the wealthy donors they were intended to honor, and were subsequently removed from the building.

=== Sculpture ===
Mihaly's sculptural work includes angels, gargoyles, an elaborate gothic mausoleum, and four tractor-trailer loads of stonework that he carved for a miniature Renaissance villa.

Mihaly's collection of gargoyles from popular town and gown characters of the University of North Carolina at Chapel Hill are on top of the restaurant, Top of the Hill, overlooking the central crossroads of Franklin and Columbia Streets. Each gargoyle has UNC rams horns. The characters include athletes Mia Hamm, Michael Jordan, and Julius Peppers as well as the street's namesake, Ben Franklin.

Client Elizabeth Edwards and her husband, Senator John Edwards, commissioned Mihaly to carve the headstone of their deceased son, Wade, out of a 24,000 pound block of Vermont marble. Edwards was "enchanted and confused" by the "weird and wonderful" artist, yet felt the sculpture of an angel caressing her child was "extraordinary". The 10-foot (3.0 m) tall monument is in Raleigh's Historic Oakwood Cemetery. Mihaly also designed the monument in Historic Oakwood Cemetery for Edwards after her death in 2010 from breast cancer.

=== Conceptual art ===
During the March 7, 2009 opening of Mihaly's Duke University solo exhibit at the Louise Jones Brown Gallery, A Pantheon of Modern Gods: An Anthropological Expedition into Corridors of Power, Mihaly paced the gallery, lecturing with a small sculpture entitled Cherub cradled in his arms, in front of visitors. All the works in the exhibition were accompanied by quotations.

The Gallery manager Rachel Pea described the art as "edgy" and "one of the more in-your-face sort of exhibits" since it challenges the viewer's ideas on the fabric of society: war, politics, money and religion.

Mihaly's work "conveys illuminating social commentary" about "frightening political possibilities". The Goddess of Eugenics is an oil on linen replication of Botticelli's The Birth of Venus, except Venus's body is pierced with bullet holes and dripping authentic blood. The Zephyrs blow symbols of radiation and biohazard waste rather than the west wind. Mihaly's description of the painting alludes to intricate plots by world leaders to cleanse the population.

=== Architecture ===
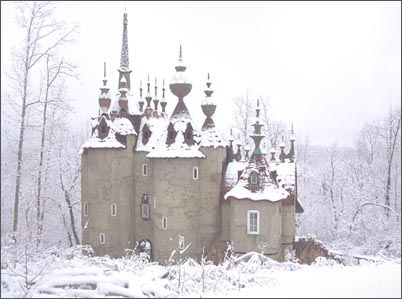
Castle Mont Rouge in the snow, Rougemont, North Carolina

Mihaly's former part-time country estate and studio is called Castle Mont Rouge. The castle, located on Red Mountain in Rougemont, North Carolina, features onion domes like Eastern Orthodox churches and oxidized copper cupolas.

Much rumor and lore has been built around the castle and its creator, Robert Mihaly. Mihaly referenced the rumor about the death of his wife in a televised news story, acknowledging that he is not a widower.
