= Rougemont, North Carolina =

- Census-designated place
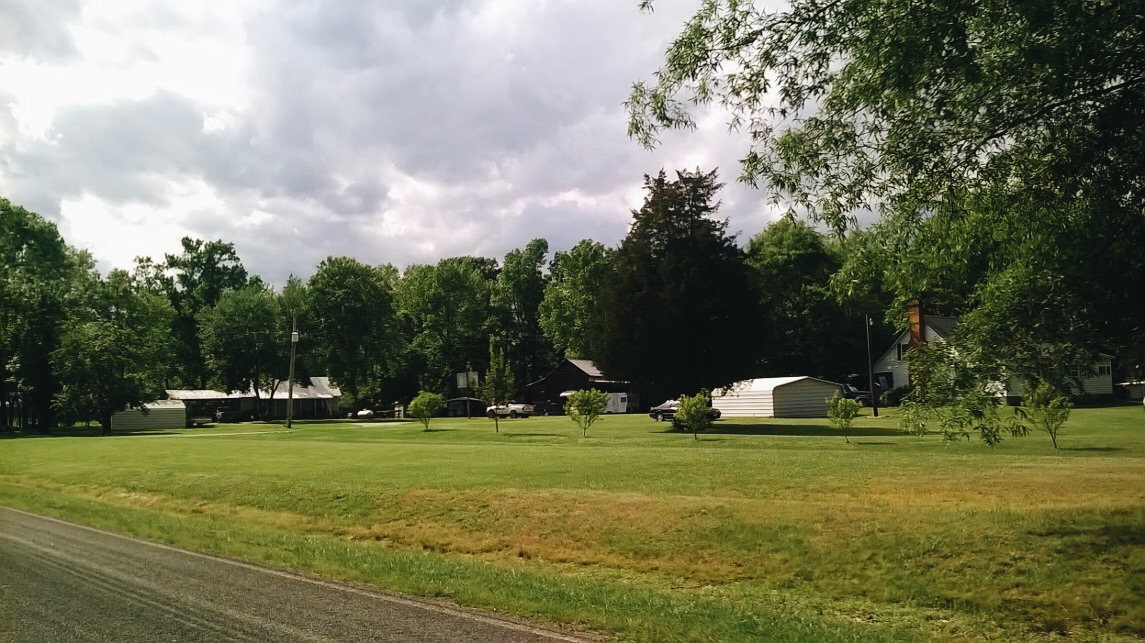

- Location in Durham County and the state of North Carolina
- Coordinates: 36°13′15″N 78°55′14″W
- Country: United States
- State: North Carolina
- County: Durham and Person

Area
  - Total: 6.39 sq mi (16.56 km^{2})
  - Land: 6.32 sq mi (16.36 km^{2})
  - Water: 0.077 sq mi (0.20 km^{2})
- Elevation: 574 ft (175 m)

Population (2020)
  - Total: 1,001
  - Density: 159/sq mi (61.2/km^{2})
- Time zone: UTC-5 (Eastern (EST))
  - Summer (DST): UTC-4 (EDT)
- ZIP codes: 27572
- FIPS code: 37-58040
- GNIS feature ID: 2628653

Rougemont is an unincorporated community and census-designated place (CDP) in Durham and Person counties, North Carolina, United States. As of the 2020 census, Rougemont had a population of 1,001. An act to incorporate Rougemont as a town was introduced to the North Carolina General Assembly in 2011, resulting in a referendum where the incorporation was rejected by a margin of 10 votes.

== Geography ==
Rougemont is located in northern Durham County along U.S. Route 501. The center of town is 17 miles (27 km) north of the center of Durham and 13 miles (21 km) south of Roxboro. The CDP extends north into Person County as far as the Flat River, east to Moores Mill Road, south to Quail Roost Farm Road, and west to Harris Road and Chambers Road. The Rougemont ZIP code covers a much larger area, extending west into Orange County and east into Granville County, but all population statistics are for the smaller CDP area.

== Demographics ==
Historical population
Census	Pop.	Note	%±
2020	1,001		—
U.S. Decennial Census

== Education ==
The portion in Durham County, the vast majority of the CDP, is in the Durham Public Schools school district.

The portion in Person County is in the Person County Schools school district.

== Points of interest ==
- Castle Mont Rouge, designed by Robert Mihaly
- Orange County Speedway, 2.5 miles (4.0 km) west of town
- Little River Regional Park, Little River Regional Park & Natural Area in Orange/Durham County
