= John Auchard =

American academic

John Auchard is a professor of English at the University of Maryland, College Park.

== Publications ==
- Four Trials (Simon & Schuster 2003) (co-written with Senator John Edwards)
- The Portable Henry James. New Edition (Penguin 2004)
- (editor) Graham Greene, Monsignor Quixote (Penguin 2008)
- (editor) Graham Greene, The Captain and the Enemy (Penguin 2005)
- (editor) Henry James, Italian Hours (Penn State Press 1992; Penguin 1995)
- Silence in Henry James: The Heritage of Symbolism and Decadence (Penn State Press 1986)
- Articles in American Literature: 1968-1975 (collaboration with Lewis Leary) (Duke 1980)
- American Literature: A Study and Research Guide (collaboration with Lewis Leary) (St. Martins 1976)
- Travel writing for The Washington Post.
