= Cate Edwards =

American lawyer (born 1982)

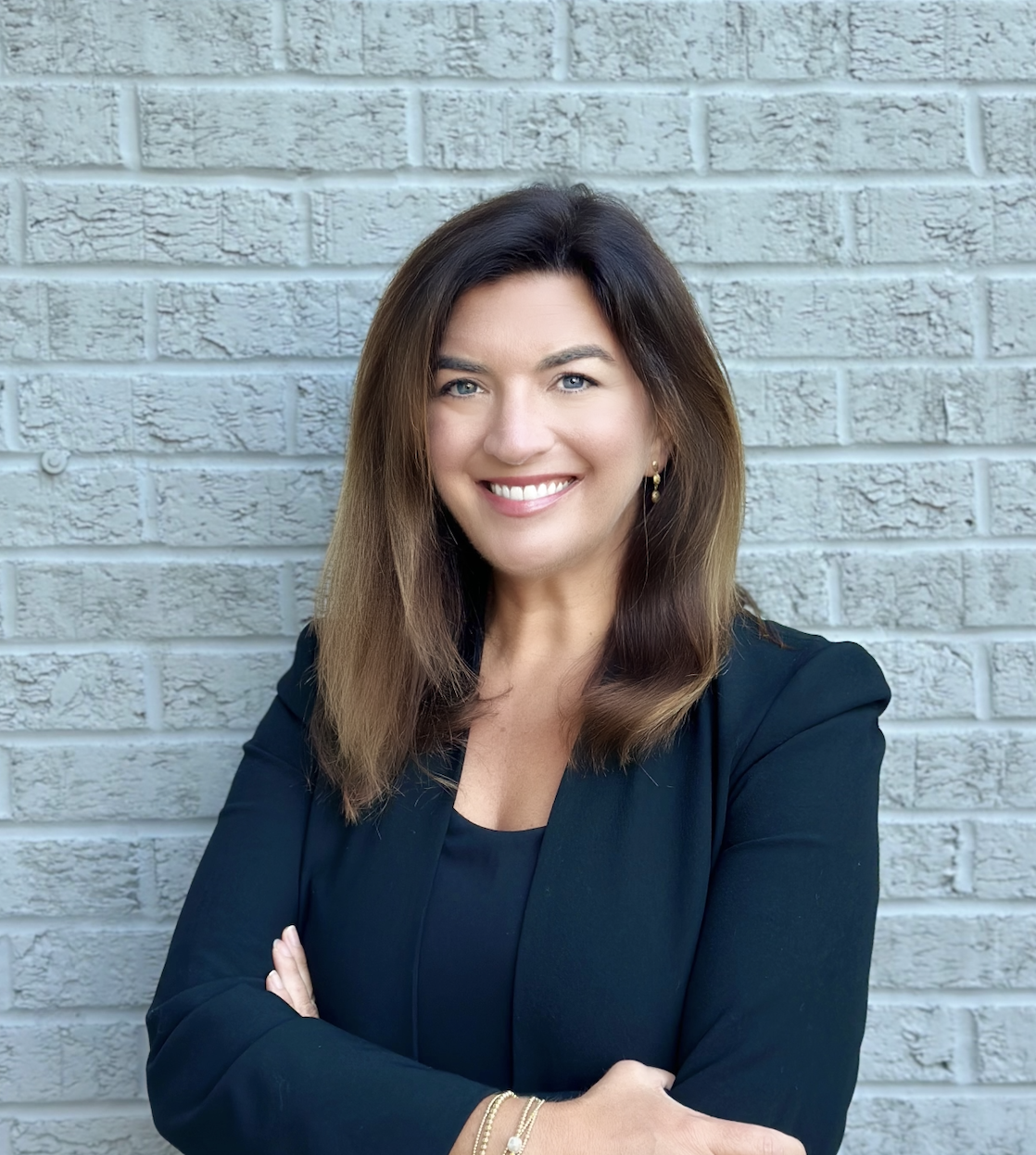
- Edwards in 2023
- Born: Catharine Elizabeth Edwards; March 4, 1982 (age 44); Raleigh, North Carolina, U.S.
- Education: Princeton University (BA); Harvard University (JD)
- Occupations: Attorney; author
- Years active: 2004–present
- Spouse: Trevor Upham (m. 2011)
- Children: 3
- Parent(s): John Edwards; Elizabeth Anania

Catharine Elizabeth Edwards (born March 4, 1982) is an American attorney. Edwards is the daughter of former United States Senator John Edwards and Elizabeth Edwards.

== Early life and education ==
Born in Raleigh, North Carolina, where her parents were practicing attorneys, Edwards was educated in the Wake County Public School System. She attended Aldert Root Elementary School, Daniels Middle School, and Needham B. Broughton High School, where she graduated at the top of her class. In high school, she played soccer, basketball, and softball, and was named All-Conference and Most Valuable Player her senior year. Her siblings are: Wade (1979–1996), Emma Claire (born 1998), Jack (born 2000) and half sibling Quinn (2008) her father's daughter with Rielle Hunter.

Edwards attended Princeton University, majoring in political economics, and graduating with honors. She is a member of the Pi Beta Phi sorority, and was an intern for the Council on Foreign Relations.

== Political activity and career ==
In 2004, Edwards accompanied her father on the campaign trail and campaigned on his behalf while he pursued the Democratic presidential nomination, a venture that ultimately proved to be unsuccessful.

After the presidential election, she lived in New York City and worked as an editorial assistant for Vanity Fair. While in New York, she and co-worker Jessica Flint founded an online Rolodex called UrbanistaOnline to help young newcomers settle into New York. In 2004, she also became a member of the board of directors of the youth voter initiative Generation Engage. She was an active campaigner during her father's 2008 campaign for the Democratic presidential nomination. In the fall of 2012, she returned to the college campus of Winthrop University, where she spoke to students about the importance of voting and the necessity of refusing to be a bystander in our democracy.

Edwards entered Harvard Law School in the fall 2006. In the summer after her first year in law school, she worked as intern to Nina Totenberg at NPR. In fall 2007, she became a member of the Harvard Legal Aid Bureau. Edwards graduated from Harvard Law in 2009. She then moved to Washington, D.C., and served as a judicial law clerk for Judge Leonie M. Brinkema of the Eastern District of Virginia before joining a civil rights law firm in Washington, D.C. She temporarily left the practice of law in May 2011, after the death of her mother, Elizabeth, to start a foundation in her mother's honor. She returned to the practice of law in mid-2012 and was a partner at Edwards Kirby, the law firm of her father and attorneys David Kirby and William Bystrynski before she founded her own law firm called Edwards Beightol with fellow litigator Kristen Beightol in 2021.

=== Gay marriage stance ===
Early in the 2004 presidential campaign, Edwards became the first family member of the Democratic candidates to state that she was in favor of legalizing gay marriage. On September 30, 2007, during a campaign stop with actor James Denton, she was quoted by CNN as saying: "I'm on my mom's side with this, not my dad's. It's the word 'marriage' that he is hung up on". The news organization then went on to state in its report that John Edwards "does not support gay marriage, but his wife, Elizabeth, does". (John Edwards supported civil unions, while Elizabeth Edwards had stated that she supported gay marriage.) She also declared her support for Trevor Thomas, an openly gay candidate for U.S. Congress in Michigan. As part of her former law practice at Edwards and Eubanks, she represented clients faced with discrimination based on their sexual orientation.

== Personal life ==
Edwards married her longtime boyfriend, cardiothoracic surgeon Trevor Upham, in October 2011. They have three children.

Cate Edwards stood by her father, John Edwards, as he faced felony charges of conspiracy, false statements, and campaign law violations for the cover-up of $925,000 in illicit campaign contributions. John Edwards was acquitted on one federal count on May 31, 2012, while a jury deadlocked on five other counts. Edwards was not retried on any of the outstanding charges and resumed his law practice.
