= Charles Robin Britt =

American politician from North Carolina

Robin Britt
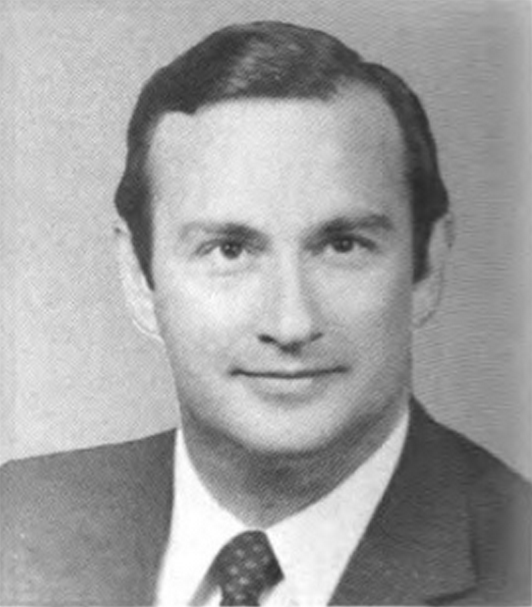

Secretary of the North Carolina Department of Human Resources
- In office 1993–1997
- Governor: Jim Hunt
- Preceded by: David Flaherty
- Succeeded by: David Bruton

Member of the U.S. House of Representatives from North Carolina's 6th district
- In office January 3, 1983 – January 3, 1985
- Preceded by: Walter E. Johnston III
- Succeeded by: Howard Coble

Personal details
- Born: Charles Robin Britt; June 29, 1942 (age 84) San Antonio, Texas, U.S.
- Party: Democratic
- Spouse: Susan Britt
- Children: 3
- Education: University of North Carolina, Chapel Hill (BA, JD); New York University (LLM)

Military service
- Allegiance: United States
- Branch: United States Navy
- Service years: 1963–1984
- Rank: Commander
- Unit: United States Navy Reserve

Charles Robin Britt (born June 29, 1942) is an American lawyer and politician who is a former Member of the United States House of Representatives from North Carolina's 6th congressional district. A Democrat, he served one term from 1983 to 1985.

== Biography ==
Britt grew up in Asheville, North Carolina and graduated from Enka High School in 1959. He received a B.A. from the University of North Carolina at Chapel Hill in 1963 and a Juris Doctor from the same institution as well as an LL.M. degree from New York University in 1976. He was admitted to the North Carolina bar in 1973 and commenced practice in Greensboro. From 1963 until 1984, he was a member of the United States Naval Reserve.

His wife was Susan Britt.

=== Early political career ===
Britt was a delegate to the North Carolina State Democratic convention in 1980.

=== Congress ===
In 1982, he was elected to Congress from a Greensboro-based district, defeating one-term Republican Eugene Johnston. He was narrowly defeated for reelection in 1984 by State Representative Howard Coble, largely due to Ronald Reagan's victory that year. Reagan carried the district by a nearly 2-to-1 margin.

Britt sought a rematch against Coble in 1986 and lost by only 79 votes.

=== Later career ===
Britt served as president and director of Project Uplift in Greensboro, N.C. and as secretary of the North Carolina State Department of Human Resources 1993 to 1997.

Britt attempted a comeback in 2002 in the newly-drawn 13th district, which contained parts of Greensboro. However, Britt was defeated in the Democratic primary by Brad Miller of Raleigh.

U.S. House of Representatives
Preceded by Walter E. Johnston III	Member of the U.S. House of Representatives from North Carolina's 6th congressional district 1983–1985	Succeeded by Howard Coble
U.S. order of precedence (ceremonial)
Preceded by Jim Gardner as Former U.S. Representative	Order of precedence of the United States as Former U.S. Representative	Succeeded by Bill Cobey as Former U.S. Representative
