= 1986 United States Senate elections in North Carolina =

1986 United States Senate election in North Carolina
- November 4, 1986
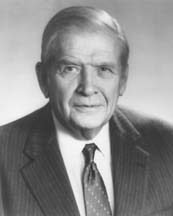

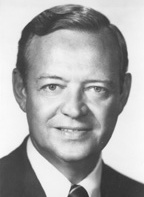
Nominee	Terry Sanford	Jim Broyhill
Party	Democratic	Republican
Regular election	823,662; 51.76%	767,668; 48.24%
Special election	780,967; 50.88%	753,881; 49.12%
- Sanford: 50–60% 60–70% 70–80% Broyhill: 50–60% 60–70% 70–80%
U.S. senator before election
Jim Broyhill
Republican
Elected U.S. Senator
Terry Sanford
Democratic

The 1986 United States Senate election in North Carolina was held on November 4, 1986 as part of the nationwide elections to the Senate. Incumbent Republican U.S. Senator Jim Broyhill, who had been appointed in June 1986 to serve out the rest of John Porter East's term, faced off against the popular Democratic former Governor Terry Sanford.

There were two separate elections held on the same day: a special election for what little remained of the 99th United States Congress (November 1986-January 1987) and a regular election for a new six-year term (beginning in January 1987). The primary elections were designed to nominate the same candidates to both the special and the regular elections. Sanford won both elections.

== Democratic primary ==
Terry Sanford, then the outgoing president of Duke University, first said in September 1985 that he was planning to run for the U.S. Senate the next year but quickly withdrew, as it appeared that the party wanted a "fresh" face, most likely in the person of UNC System President William Friday. Then, Friday declined to run, as did other well-known politicians like former Governor Jim Hunt.

Former North Carolina Secretary of Commerce Lauch Faircloth then made it known that he would run, but he was considered too conservative by many party leaders, who encouraged Sanford to enter the race in order to defeat Faircloth. Sanford agreed to run, which led Faircloth and another candidate, Judge Marvin K. Blount Jr., to withdraw before filing their candidacies. Six years later, Faircloth did run for the Senate against Sanford, but this time as a Republican, in which he was victorious.

=== Candidates ===
- Walt Atkins
- William Belk, Belk department store executive and former president of Young Democrats of America
- Katherine Harper, business executive
- John Ingram, former North Carolina Commissioner of Insurance
- Theodore Kinney, real estate agent and African-American political activist
- T. L. "Fountain" Odom, Mecklenburg County commissioner and attorney (later a state senator)
- Terry Sanford, former Governor
- Betty Wallace, educator and deputy superintendent of North Carolina Department of Public Instruction

=== Results ===
Democratic primary results
Party	Candidate	Votes	%
Democratic	Terry Sanford	409,394	60.25%
Democratic	John Ingram	111,557	16.42%
Democratic	Fountain Odom	49,689	7.31%
Democratic	William Belk	33,821	4.98%
Democratic	Theodore Kinney	27,228	4.01%
Democratic	Betty Wallace	17,001	2.50%
Democratic	Katherine Harper	12,998	1.91%
Democratic	Walt Atkins	8,306	1.22%
Democratic	Others	9,493	1.40%
Total votes		679,487	100.00%

== Republican primary ==
Senator East declined to run for a second term, citing his health. Longtime U.S. Representative Jim Broyhill entered the race with much of the establishment support, but David Funderburk had the backing of the organization of Senator Jesse Helms. Funderburk charged Broyhill with being insufficiently conservative, but in the end, Broyhill won the nomination handily in the May primary. The next month, East committed suicide, and Governor James G. Martin appointed Broyhill to his seat.

=== Candidates ===
- Jim Broyhill, incumbent U.S. Senator and U.S. Congressman
- David Funderburk, former U.S. Ambassador to Romania (later a U.S. Congressman)
- Glenn Miller, perennial candidate

=== Results ===
Republican primary results
Party	Candidate	Votes	%
Republican	Jim Broyhill	139,570	66.52%
Republican	David Funderburk	63,593	30.31%
Republican	Glenn Miller	6,662	3.18%
Total votes		148,574	100.00%

== General election ==
=== Candidates ===
- Jim Broyhill (R), incumbent U.S. Senator
- Terry Sanford (D), former Governor

=== Results ===
1986 United States Senate election in North Carolina
Party	Candidate	Votes	%	±%
Democratic	Terry Sanford	823,662	51.76%	+2.38%
Republican	Jim Broyhill (incumbent)	767,668	48.24%	−1.72%
Total votes		1,591,330	100.00%	N/A
Democratic gain from Republican				

== Special election ==
=== Candidates ===
- Jim Broyhill (R), incumbent U.S. Senator and U.S. Congressman
- Terry Sanford (D), former Governor

=== Results ===
1986 North Carolina U.S. Senate election – Special election
Party	Candidate	Votes	%
Democratic	Terry Sanford	780,967	50.88%
Republican	Jim Broyhill (incumbent)	753,881	49.12%
Total votes		1,534,875	100.00%
Democratic gain from Republican			

== See also ==
- 1986 United States Senate elections
