= Elizabeth Edwards =

American attorney (1949–2010)

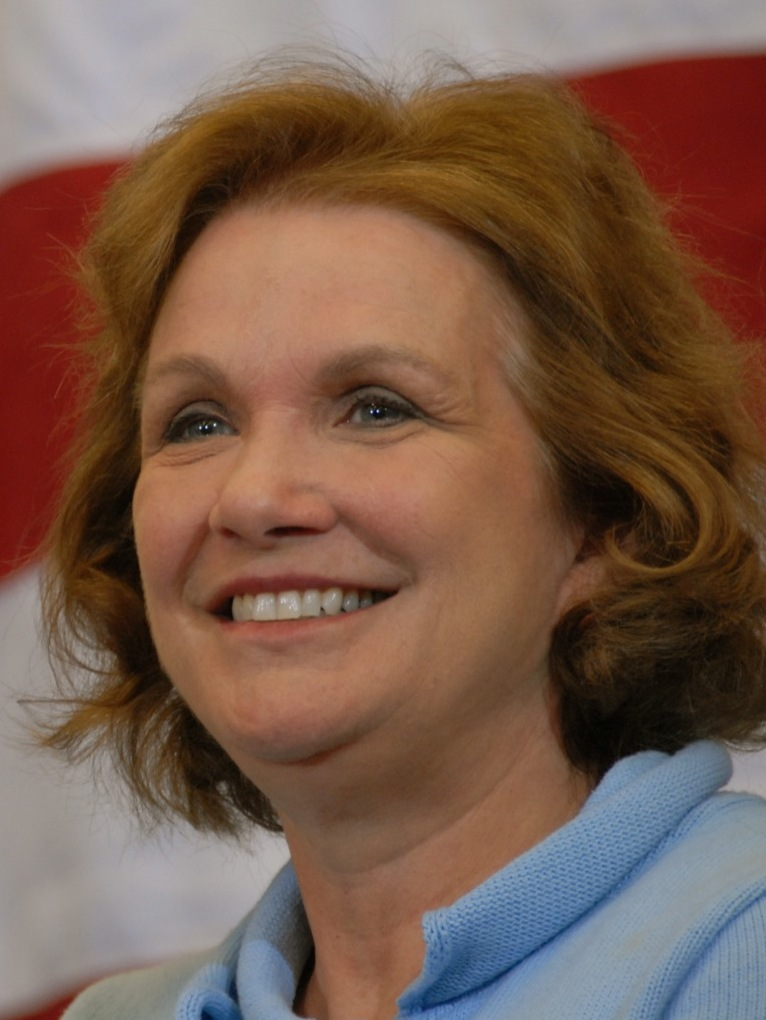
- Edwards in 2008
- Born: Mary Elizabeth Anania; July 3, 1949; Jacksonville, Florida, U.S.
- Died: December 7, 2010 (aged 61); Chapel Hill, North Carolina, U.S.
- Resting place: Historic Oakwood Cemetery
- Education: University of Mary Washington; University of North Carolina, Chapel Hill (BA, JD)
- Occupation: Attorney
- Political party: Democratic
- Spouse: John Edwards (m. 1977; sep. 2010)
- Children: 4, including Cate

Mary Elizabeth Anania Edwards (July 3, 1949 – December 7, 2010) was an American attorney, author, and health care activist. She was married to John Edwards, the former U.S. Senator from North Carolina who was the Democratic vice-presidential nominee in the 2004 U.S. presidential election.

Edwards lived a private life until her husband's rise as senator and ultimately unsuccessful vice presidential and presidential campaigns. She was his chief policy advisor during his presidential bid, and was instrumental in pushing him towards more liberal stances on subjects such as universal health care. She was also an advocate for gay marriage, and was against the Iraq War, both topics about which she and her husband disagreed.

In the final years of her life, Edwards publicly dealt with her husband's admission of an extramarital affair and her breast cancer, writing two books and making numerous media appearances. She separated from John Edwards in early 2010. On December 6, 2010, her family announced that her cancer had spread and that her doctors had stated that further treatment would be unproductive. She died the next day.

== Early life ==
Mary Elizabeth Anania was born in 1949, the daughter of Mary Elizabeth Thweatt Anania (1923–2012) and Vincent Anania (1920–2008). She grew up in a military family, moving many times and never having a hometown. Her father, a United States Navy pilot, was transferred from military base to military base during her childhood and adolescence; for part of her childhood, she lived in Japan, where her father was stationed. She wrote in her book Saving Graces that one of the difficult relocations that she went through was moving during her senior year of high school. Some of her childhood friends' fathers were killed in war, and Edwards recalled childhood memories of attending their funerals. She also wrote about the stress of living on a military base and seeing a constant stream of wounded soldiers while her father was away fighting in Vietnam.

Edwards had two younger siblings: a brother, Jay Anania, a professor of film at New York University and a sister, Nancy Anania. Edwards graduated from the Francis C. Hammond High School in Alexandria, Virginia, then attended Mary Washington College in Fredericksburg, Virginia. She transferred to the University of North Carolina at Chapel Hill (UNC), where she earned a Bachelor's degree. After three years of postgraduate studies in English, she entered UNC's School of Law and earned a Juris Doctor.

== Professional life ==
Edwards began her career as a judicial law clerk for a federal judge Joseph Calvitt Clarke Jr.. She then moved to Nashville, Tennessee, in 1978 to become an associate at the law firm of Harwell Barr Martin & Sloan. In 1981, she and her husband moved their family to Raleigh, where she worked in the Office of the Attorney General and at the law firm Merriman Nicholls and Crampton. She kept the last name Anania until 1996, when she retired from the practice of law following the death of her son Wade; she changed her name to Elizabeth Anania Edwards in his memory. Following her retirement from law, she devoted much of her time to the administration of the Wade Edwards Foundation. She taught legal writing as an adjunct instructor at the University of North Carolina School of Law and worked as a substitute teacher in the Wake County Public Schools. In August 2009, she opened a furniture store in Chapel Hill.

In September 2006, Random House published her first book, Saving Graces: Finding Solace and Strength from Friends and Strangers, which focused on the ways different communities have helped her through the trials of her life, from her itinerant military childhood to the death of her son and her early bout with breast cancer. In May 2009, Random House published her second book, Resilience: Reflections on the Burdens and Gifts of Facing Life's Adversities, in which she discussed the return of her illness, the deaths of her father and son and the effect of those events on her marriage, her husband's infidelity, and the state of healthcare in America. Both books were bestsellers.

== Political activity ==
During much of 2004, Edwards joined her husband, United States Democratic vice presidential nominee John Edwards, on the campaign trail. She took a similar role in her husband's 2008 presidential bid, and was one of his closest advisers.

As spouse of the vice presidential nominee, Edwards spoke at the 2004 Democratic National Convention.

Edwards disagreed with her husband on the topic of same-sex marriage. She became a vocal advocate in 2007 when she stated: "I don't know why someone else's marriage has anything to do with me. I'm completely comfortable with gay marriage."

On June 10, 2008, it was revealed that Edwards would be advising her husband's former rival and eventual Democratic nominee, Barack Obama, on healthcare issues. Her husband also endorsed Obama during the later stages of the 2008 primary season.

Edwards became a senior fellow at the American Progress Action Fund and testified before Congress about healthcare reform on its behalf.

== Personal life ==
Anania met John Edwards when they were both law students, and they married on July 30, 1977.

Early in their marriage, the couple had two children: Lucius "Wade" (1979–1996) and Catharine "Cate" (born 1982). Wade died at age 16 on April 4, 1996, when he lost control of his Jeep and crashed while driving from their home in Raleigh to the family's beach house near Wilmington. Three weeks before his death, Wade had been honored by First Lady Hillary Clinton at the White House as one of ten finalists in an essay contest sponsored by the National Endowment for the Humanities and the Voice of America. Wade, accompanied by his parents and his sister, met North Carolina Senator Jesse Helms. After Wade died, Helms entered his essay and his obituary into the Congressional Record. Wade is buried in Raleigh's Oakwood Cemetery, with a grave designed by Robert Mihaly.

Following Wade's death, Elizabeth and John decided to have more children, and she underwent fertility treatments. They had a daughter, Emma Claire (born 1998), and a son, John "Jack" (born 2000).

After John's public admission on January 21, 2010, that he fathered a child with a mistress named Rielle Hunter, Elizabeth legally separated from him, intending to file for divorce after North Carolina's mandatory one-year separation policy.

== Illness and death ==
On November 3, 2004, the day her husband lost the vice presidency, Edwards announced that she had been diagnosed with breast cancer. She later revealed that she discovered a lump in her breast while on a campaign stop a few weeks earlier in Kenosha, Wisconsin, in the midst of the campaign. Edwards became an activist for women's health and cancer patients, and underwent oncology treatments. In a November 2006 comment on the Daily Kos website, Edwards stated that on her last visit, her oncologist informed her that her cancer was no longer present, writing, "When I last went to my oncologist in North Carolina, she said that I had a lot going on in my life – and that is an understatement – but cancer was not one of them."

At a March 22, 2007 press conference, John and Elizabeth announced that her cancer had returned, and that his campaign for the Presidency would continue as before. The announcement included the information that she was asymptomatic, and therefore that she expected to be an active part of the campaign.

Her doctor, Dr. Lisa Carey of the University of North Carolina's Lineberger Comprehensive Cancer Center, described the diagnosis as stage IV (metastatic) breast cancer with a spot in her rib and possibly her lung. In a March 25 interview on 60 Minutes, Edwards said that there was also a spot in her hip found on her bone scan. The Edwardses and Carey stressed that the cancer was not curable, but was treatable. In early April 2007, Edwards was informed that her cancer might be treatable with anti-estrogen drugs. "I consider that a good sign. It means there are more medications to which I can expect to be responsive," she told the Associated Press during a campaign stop with her husband in Cedar Rapids, Iowa. However, days later, in an interview with Newsweek's Jonathan Alter, she said, "When I was first diagnosed, I was going to beat this. I was going to be the champion of cancer. And I don't have that feeling now. The cancer will eventually kill me. It's going to win this fight."

On December 6, 2010, Edwards' family announced that she had stopped cancer treatment after her doctors informed her that further treatment would be unproductive, because the cancer had metastasized to her liver. She had been advised she had several weeks to live. Her family members, including her estranged husband John, were with her. She posted her last message on Facebook:

You all know that I have been sustained throughout my life by three saving graces – my family, my friends, and a faith in the power of resilience and hope. These graces have carried me through difficult times and they have brought more joy to the good times than I ever could have imagined. The days of our lives, for all of us, are numbered. We know that. And, yes, there are certainly times when we aren't able to muster as much strength and patience as we would like. It's called being human. But I have found that in the simple act of living with hope, and in the daily effort to have a positive impact in the world, the days I do have are made all the more meaningful and precious. And for that I am grateful. It isn't possible to put into words the love and gratitude I feel to everyone who has and continues to support and inspire me every day. To you I simply say: you know.

Edwards died the next day of metastatic breast cancer at home in Chapel Hill; she was 61 years old. Her funeral, held at Edenton Street United Methodist Church in Raleigh, was open to the public and was attended by over 1,200 people, including North Carolina Governor Beverly Perdue, Senators John Kerry and Kay Hagan, and Victoria Reggie Kennedy. Threats of protests by the anti-gay coalition led by Westboro Baptist Church attracted at least 300 local Raleigh residents prepared to counterprotest in support of the Edwards family, but only five Westboro protesters showed up and were kept blocks away. Elizabeth Edwards' marble monument was created by sculptor Robert Mihaly. She is interred with her son Wade in Oakwood Cemetery in Raleigh, North Carolina.

== See also ==
- John Edwards 2004 presidential campaign
- John Edwards 2008 presidential campaign
- 1998 United States Senate election in North Carolina

== Publications ==
- Saving Graces: Finding Solace and Strength from Friends and Strangers, ISBN 978-0-7679-2538-9, Broadway Books 2006
- Resilience: Reflections on the Burdens and Gifts of Facing Life's Adversities , ISBN 978-0-7679-3156-4, Broadway Books 2009
