= Castle Mont Rouge =

Castle in Rougemont, North Carolina, U.S.

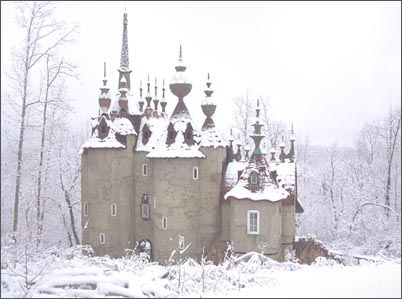
- The castle in 2009
- Interactive map of the Castle Mont Rouge area

General information
- Status: Under construction
- Location: 957 Mountain Brook Rd Rougemont, North Carolina, 27572, Rougemont, North Carolina, United States
- Coordinates: 36.23958°N 78.91303°W
- Named for: Red Mountain
- Groundbreaking: 2000

Design and construction
- Architect: Robert Mihaly

Castle Mont Rouge is a castle located on Red Mountain in Rougemont, North Carolina, north of Durham. The castle was designed by American sculptor Robert Mihaly, known for his work at Duke University and the National Cathedral, as a private residence and country studio. The design was based on architecture from Central and Eastern Europe, complete with 18 pinnacles and a turret.

Robert Mihaly began construction of Castle Mont Rouge without a blueprint in the year 2000.

The castle was abandoned in 2006, although a fundraising campaign featuring Mihaly's children was launched to fund renovating it in 2014. The castle was still abandoned as of 2016. Mihaly began restoring the castle in 2017, citing his desire to finish it while his children are still children.

The castle has been cited as a Disney-like fairytale castle, an abandoned or deserted castle, a quirky North Carolina destination, and the most bizarre building in North Carolina.

Much rumor and lore has been built around Castle Mont Rouge and its creator, Robert Mihaly. Mihaly referenced the rumor about the death of his wife in a televised news story, acknowledging that he is not a widower.

== Gallery ==
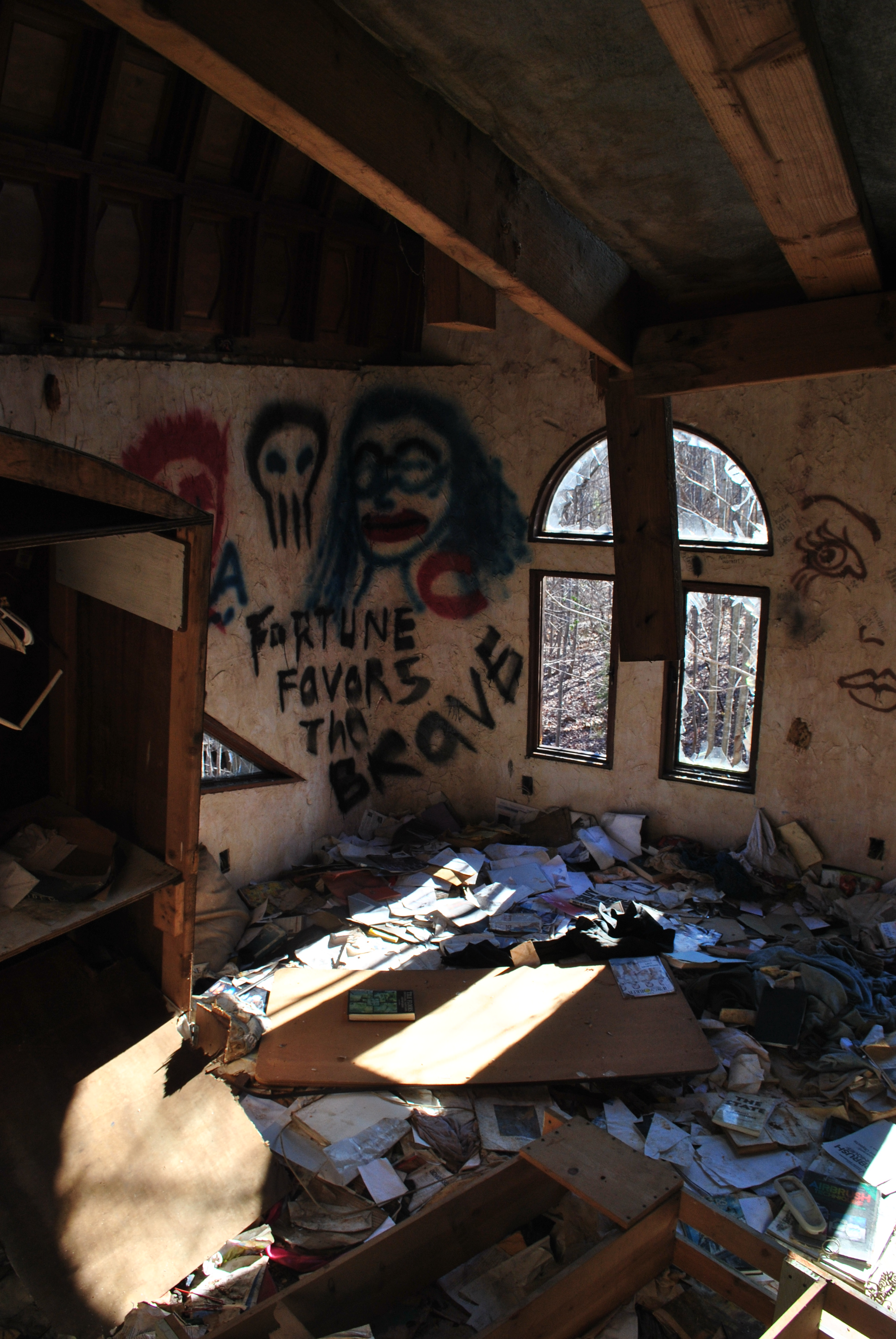

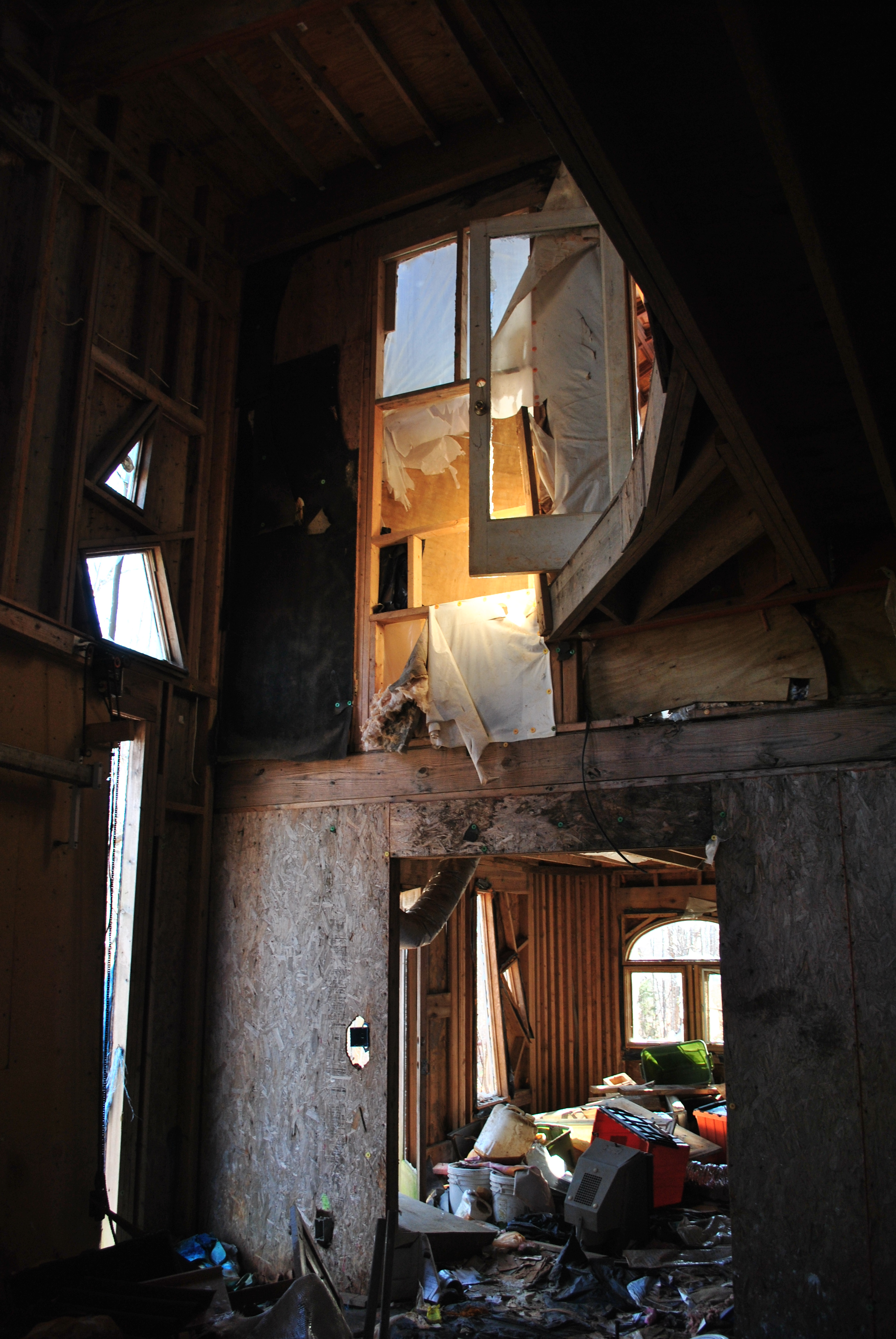
