= 1998 United States Senate election in North Carolina =

- November 3, 1998
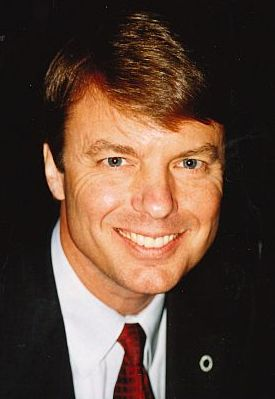

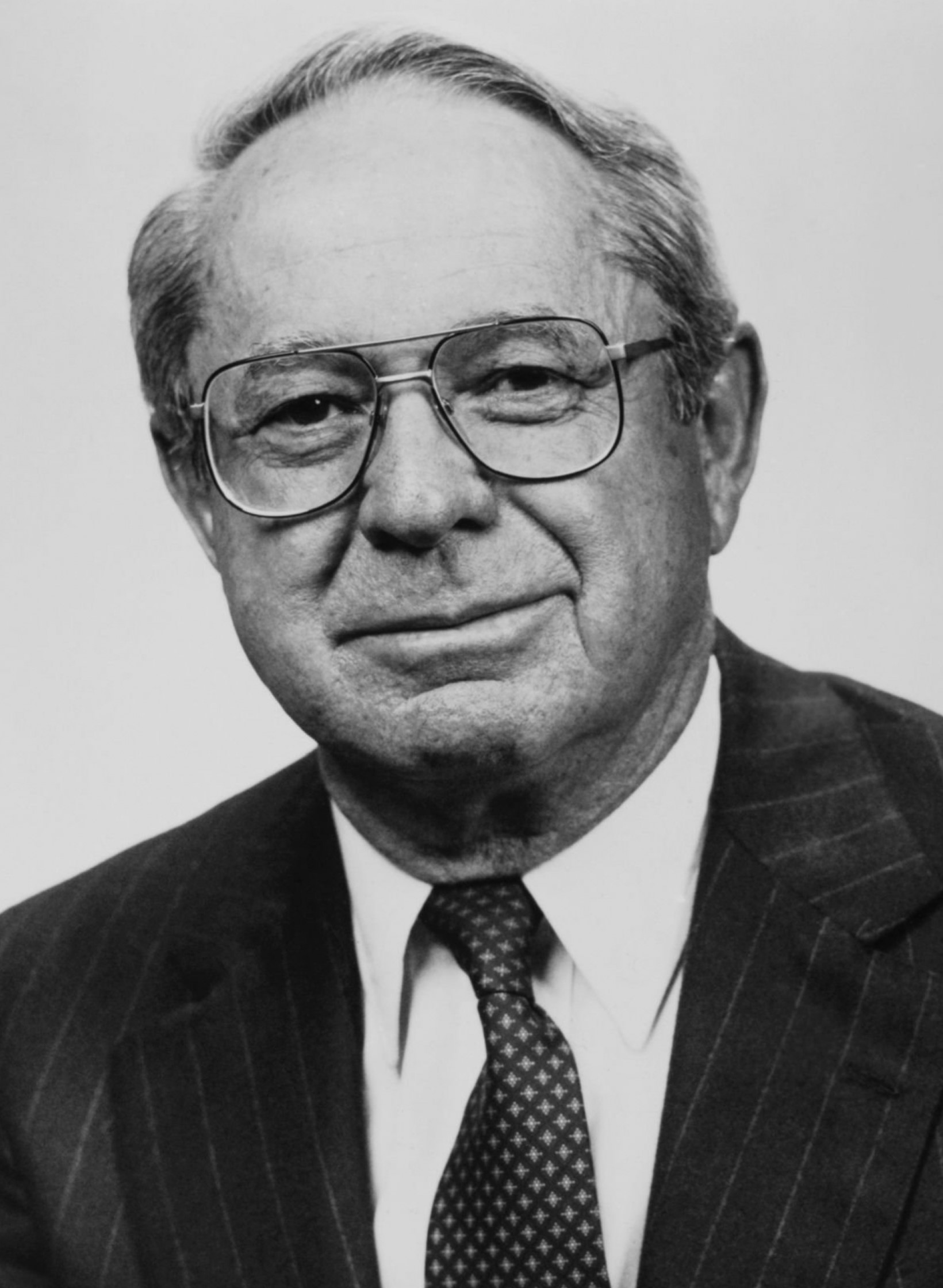
Nominee	John Edwards	Lauch Faircloth
Party	Democratic	Republican
Popular vote	1,029,237	945,943
Percentage	51.15%	47.01%
- County results Edwards: 40–50% 50–60% 60–70% 70–80% Faircloth: 40–50% 50–60% 60–70%
U.S. senator before election
Lauch Faircloth
Republican
Elected U.S. Senator
John Edwards
Democratic

The 1998 United States Senate election in North Carolina was held on November 3, 1998. Republican incumbent Lauch Faircloth ran for re-election to a second term but was defeated by Democratic trial attorney John Edwards.

At 45 years of age, Edwards became the youngest elected U.S. senator from North Carolina. Edwards later declined to run for reelection in 2004, choosing instead to run for president of the United States. Eventually, he was chosen as the Democratic nominee for vice president by John Kerry. They lost to incumbents George W. Bush and Dick Cheney, and Edwards later ran again for president in 2008.

As of 2026, this is the last time a Democrat won North Carolina's Class 3 Senate seat, a male Democrat won a senate election of this state until Roy Cooper was elected on the state's other senate seat, a member of the incumbent president's party unseated an incumbent in a state the party had lost in the prior presidential election. (Note: Subsequently, the Republicans won the 2002 United States Senate election in Minnesota following then-president George W. Bush's loss in the state in 2000, but incumbent Democratic senator Paul Wellstone had died in a plane crash 11 days before the general election and was replaced on the ballot by Walter Mondale.)

== Republican primary ==
In the Republican primary, Faircloth easily defeated two minor candidates.

== Democratic primary ==
=== Candidates ===
- Bob Ayers Jr.
- James Carmack
- John Edwards, Raleigh attorney
- Gene Gay
- D. G. Martin, former vice chancellor of the University of North Carolina at Chapel Hill
- Mike Robinson
- Ella Scarborough, former member of the Charlotte City Council

==== Declined ====
- Mike Easley, North Carolina attorney general since 1993
- Harvey Gantt, former mayor of Charlotte and 1990 and 1996 nominee for Senate
- Mike Robinson, Davidson County businessman
- Charlie Sanders, former CEO of Glaxo and candidate for Senate in 1996

Going into the 1998 campaign, several prominent Democrats declined to run for Senate, including Mike Easley, Harvey Gantt, and Charlie Sanders.

=== Results ===
In the Democratic primary, Edwards defeated his closest rival D.G. Martin, former vice chancellor of the University of North Carolina at Chapel Hill. The race also featured former Charlotte city councilwoman Ella Scarborough and several minor candidates.

1998 Democratic U.S. Senate primary
Party	Candidate	Votes	%
Democratic	John Edwards	277,468	51.38%
Democratic	D. G. Martin	149,049	27.60%
Democratic	Ella Scarborough	55,486	10.28%
Democratic	Bob Ayers Jr.	22,477	4.16%
Democratic	Mike Robinson	20,178	3.74%
Democratic	James Carmack	8,200	1.52%
Democratic	Gene Gay	7,173	1.33%
Total votes		540,031	100.00%

== General election ==
=== Candidates ===
- John Edwards, Raleigh attorney (Democratic)
- Barbara Howe (Libertarian)
- Lauch Faircloth, incumbent U.S. senator since 1993 (Republican)

=== Campaign ===
During the campaign, Edwards fashioned himself as a "people's advocate", while Faircloth accused Edwards of being too friendly towards labor unions. Referring to Edwards as a "tobacco-taxing liberal", Faircloth's campaign ran ads alleging that Edwards' position on tobacco regulation would lead to job losses in the state.

Edwards' campaign refused financial support from political action committees and ran ads criticizing Faircloth's record on Medicare and Social Security. Edwards' victory was partially attributed by some observers to blowback against the Faircloth campaign's use of negative advertising.

=== Polling ===
Poll source	Date(s)	Sample size (Note: Key: A – all adults RV – registered voters LV – likely voters V – unclear)	Margin of error	Lauch Faircloth (R)	John Edwards (D)	Other / undecided (Note: Calculated by taking the difference of 100% and all other candidates combined.)
SurveyUSA	November 1, 1998	700	—	47%	49%	4%
Harris Insights & Analytics	October 30, 1998	1,418	—	39%	54%	7%
Mason-Dixon Polling & Strategy	October 26–28, 1998	827 (LV)	± 3.5%	44%	43%	13%
Harris Insights & Analytics	October 20, 1998	1,163	—	38%	47%	15%
Mason-Dixon Polling & Strategy	October 11–13, 1998	836 (LV)	± 3.5%	45%	43%	12%
Survey USA	October 9–11, 1998	500 (LV)	± 4.5%	43%	46%	11%
Mason-Dixon Polling & Strategy	September 20–22, 1998	807 (LV)	± 3.5%	50%	40%	10%
Mason-Dixon Polling & Strategy	July 25–27, 1998	829 (LV)	± 3.5%	47%	38%	15%

=== Results ===
1998 United States Senate election in North Carolina
Party	Candidate	Votes	%
Democratic	John Edwards	1,029,237	51.15%
Republican	Lauch Faircloth (incumbent)	945,943	47.01%
Libertarian	Barbara Howe	36,963	1.84%
Total votes		2,012,143	100.00%
Democratic gain from Republican			

== See also ==
- 1998 United States Senate elections
