= John Edwards =

American lawyer and politician (born 1953)

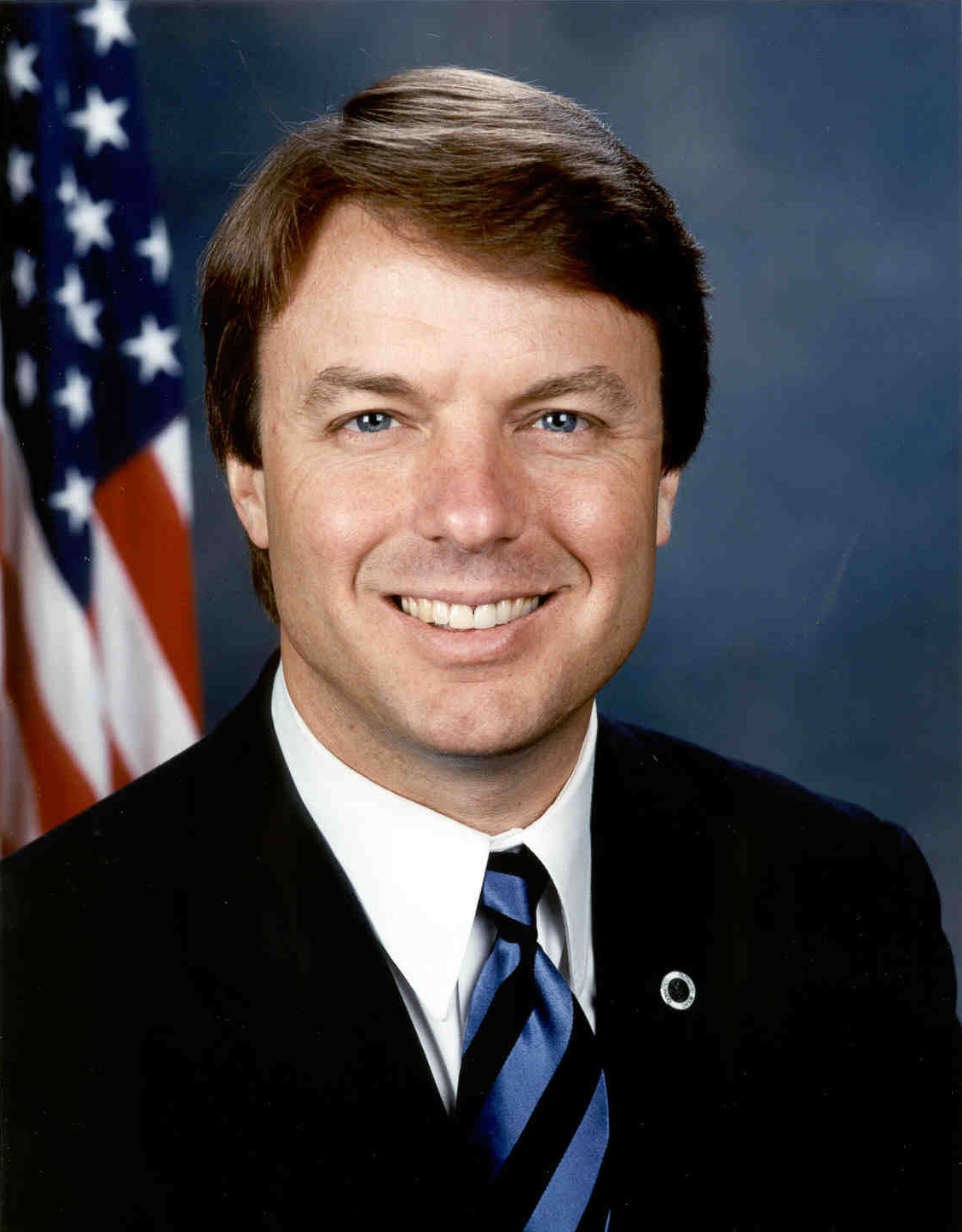
- Official portrait, c. 1999–2001

United States Senator from North Carolina
- In office January 3, 1999 – January 3, 2005
- Preceded by: Lauch Faircloth
- Succeeded by: Richard Burr

Personal details
- Born: Johnny Reid Edwards; June 10, 1953 (age 73) Seneca, South Carolina, U.S.
- Party: Democratic
- Spouse: Elizabeth Anania (m. 1977; died 2010)
- Domestic partner: Rielle Hunter (2006–2015)
- Children: 5, including Cate
- Education: Clemson University (attended); North Carolina State University (BA); University of North Carolina, Chapel Hill (JD)

Johnny Reid Edwards (born June 10, 1953) is an American lawyer and former politician who represented North Carolina in the United States Senate from 1999 to 2005. A member of the Democratic Party, he was the party's vice presidential nominee under Senator John Kerry in the 2004 presidential election. He also was a candidate for the Democratic presidential nomination in 2004 and 2008.

Edwards defeated the incumbent Republican Lauch Faircloth in North Carolina's 1998 Senate election. Toward the end of his six-year term, he declined to seek re-election, and instead sought the Democratic presidential nomination in the 2004 presidential election. Edwards suspended his campaign shortly after Super Tuesday, and later accepted the Democratic vice presidential nomination. Following Kerry's loss to incumbent president George W. Bush, Edwards began working full-time at the One America Committee, a political action committee he established in 2001, and was appointed director of the Center on Poverty, Work and Opportunity at the University of North Carolina at Chapel Hill School of Law. He was also a consultant for Fortress Investment Group LLC.

After his 2008 presidential campaign, Edwards was indicted by a federal grand jury on June 3, 2011, on six felony charges of violating multiple federal campaign contribution laws to cover up an extramarital affair to which he eventually admitted. He was found not guilty on one count, and the judge declared a mistrial on the remaining five charges, as the jury was unable to come to an agreement. The Justice Department dropped the remaining charges and did not attempt to retry Edwards. Though he was not convicted of any crime, the revelation that he had engaged in an extramarital affair and fathered a child while his wife, Elizabeth Edwards, was dying of cancer, severely damaged his public image and effectively ended his political career.

Since Kay Hagan's death on October 28, 2019, Edwards is the only living former Democratic senator from North Carolina.

== Early life and education ==
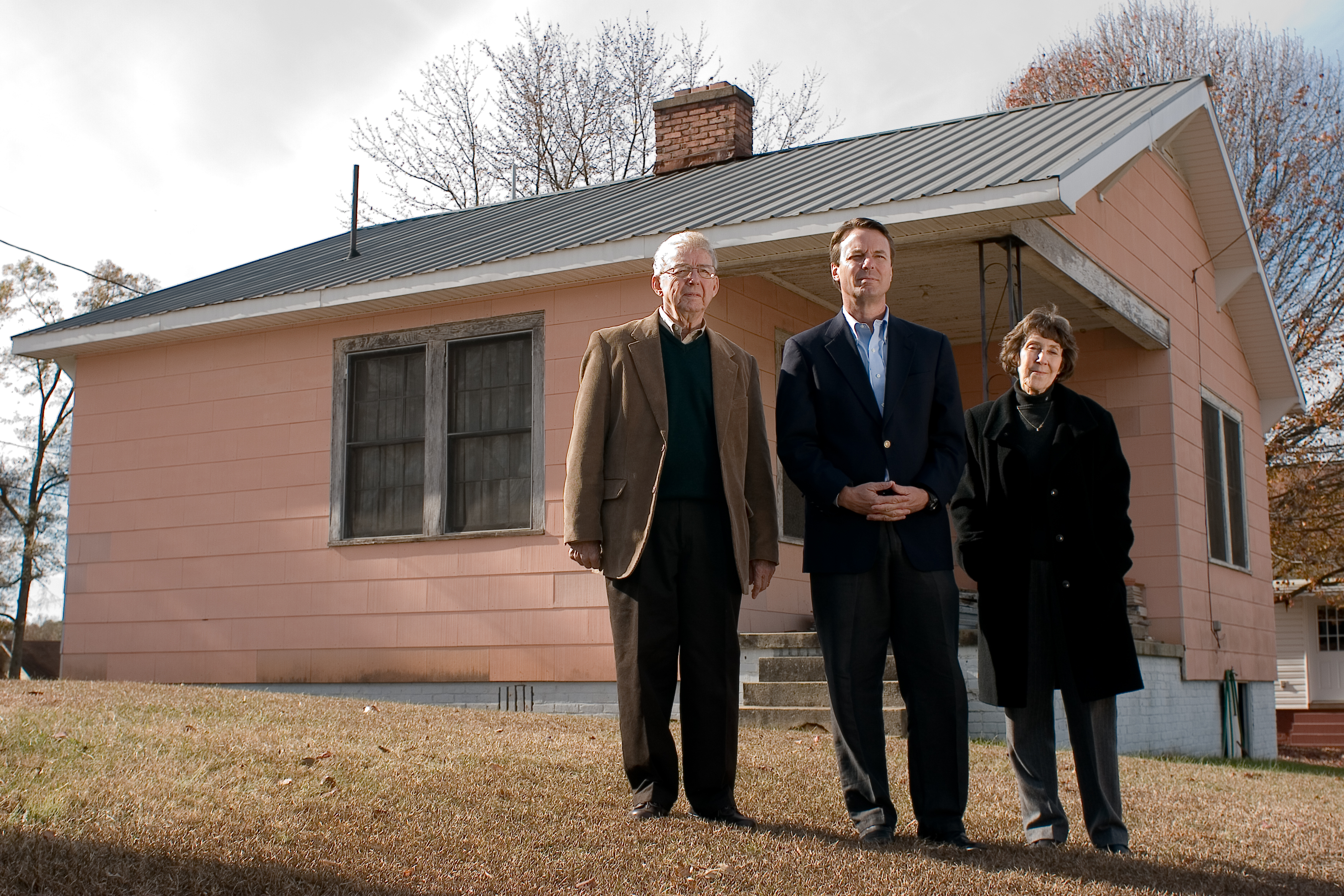
Edwards and his parents stand in front of his childhood home in 2007

Edwards was born on June 10, 1953, to Wallace Reid Edwards and Catharine Juanita "Bobbie" Edwards (née Wade) in Seneca, South Carolina. The family moved several times during Edwards's childhood, eventually settling in Robbins, North Carolina, where his father worked as a textile mill floor worker and was eventually promoted to supervisor. His mother had a roadside antique-finishing business and then worked as a letter carrier when his father left his job. The family attended a Baptist church.

A football star in high school, Edwards was the first person in his family to attend college. He attended Clemson University for one semester before transferring to North Carolina State University. He graduated from NCSU with high honors with a bachelor's degree in textile technology and a 3.8 GPA in 1974, and later earned his Juris Doctor from the University of North Carolina School of Law (UNC) with honors.

== Legal career ==
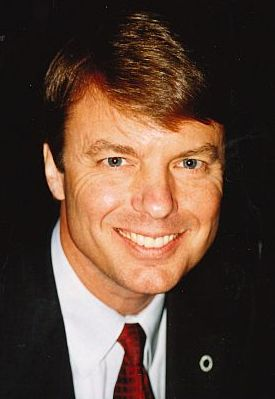
Edwards in 1996

After law school, Edwards clerked for federal judge Franklin Dupree in North Carolina, and in 1978 became an associate at the Nashville law firm of Dearborn & Ewing, doing primarily trial work, defending a Nashville bank and other corporate clients. Lamar Alexander, a Republican and future governor of and U.S. Senator from Tennessee, was among Edwards's co-workers. The Edwards family returned to North Carolina in 1981, settling in the capital of Raleigh, where he joined the firm of Tharrington, Smith & Hargrove.

In 1984, Edwards was assigned to a medical malpractice lawsuit that had been perceived to be unwinnable; the firm had accepted it only as a favor to an attorney and state senator who did not want to keep it. Nevertheless, Edwards won a $3.7 million verdict on behalf of his client, who had suffered permanent brain and nerve damage after a doctor prescribed an overdose of the anti-alcoholism drug Antabuse during alcohol aversion therapy. In other cases, Edwards sued the American Red Cross three times, alleging transmission of AIDS through tainted blood products, resulting in a confidential settlement each time, and defended a North Carolina newspaper against a libel charge.

In 1985, Edwards represented a five-year-old child born with cerebral palsy – a child whose mother's doctor did not choose to perform an immediate Caesarean delivery when a fetal monitor showed she was in distress. Edwards won a $6.5 million verdict for his client, but five weeks later, the presiding judge sustained the verdict on liability but overturned the damage award on grounds that it was "excessive" and that it appeared "to have been given under the influence of passion and prejudice", adding that in his opinion "the evidence was insufficient to support the verdict." He offered the plaintiffs $3.25 million, half of the jury's award, but the child's family appealed the case and received $4.25 million in a settlement. Winning this case established the North Carolina precedent of physician and hospital liability for failing to determine whether the patient understood the risks of a particular procedure.

After this trial, Edwards gained national attention as a plaintiff's lawyer. He filed at least twenty similar lawsuits in the years following, and achieved verdicts and settlements of more than $60 million for his clients. Similar lawsuits followed across the country. When asked about an increase in Caesarean deliveries nationwide, perhaps to avoid similar medical malpractice lawsuits, Edwards said, "The question is, would you rather have cases where that happens instead of having cases where you don't intervene and a child either becomes disabled for life or dies in utero?"

In 1993, Edwards began his own firm in Raleigh (now named Kirby & Holt) with a friend, David Kirby. He became known as the top plaintiffs' attorney in North Carolina. The biggest case of his legal career was a 1996 product liability lawsuit against Sta-Rite, the manufacturer of a defective pool drain cover. The case involved Valerie Lakey, a girl who at five years old sustained pool suction-drain injury. She was disemboweled by the suction power of the pool drain pump when she sat on an open pool drain whose protective cover had been removed by other children at the pool, after the swim club had failed to install the cover properly. Despite 12 prior suits with similar claims, Sta-Rite continued to make and sell drain covers lacking warnings. Sta-Rite protested that an additional warning would have made no difference because the pool owners already knew the importance of keeping the cover secured.

In his closing arguments, Edwards spoke to the jury for an hour and a half and made reference to his son, Wade, who had been killed shortly before testimony began. Mark Dayton, editor of North Carolina Lawyers Weekly, would later call it "the most impressive legal performance I have ever seen." The jury awarded the family $25 million, the largest personal injury award in North Carolina history. The company settled for the $25 million while the jury was deliberating additional punitive damages, rather than risk a further award. For their part in this case, Edwards and law partner David Kirby earned the Association of Trial Lawyers of America's national award for public service. The family said that they hired Edwards over other attorneys because he alone had offered to accept a smaller percentage as his fee unless the award was unexpectedly high, while all of the other lawyers they spoke with said they required the full one-third fee. The size of the jury award was unprecedented, and Edwards did receive the standard one-third-plus-expenses fee typical of contingency cases. The family was so impressed with his intelligence and commitment that they volunteered for his Senate campaign the next year.

After Edwards won a large verdict against a trucking company whose worker had been involved in a fatal accident, the North Carolina legislature passed a law prohibiting such awards unless the company had specifically sanctioned the employee's actions.

In December 2003, during his first presidential campaign, Edwards (with John Auchard) published Four Trials, an autobiographical book focusing on cases from his legal career. According to this book, the success of the Sta-Rite case and his son's death (Edwards had hoped his son would eventually join him in private law practice) prompted Edwards to leave the legal profession and seek public office.

Edwards, his daughter Cate, and David Kirby started a new law firm in 2013, named Edwards Kirby, with offices in Raleigh and in Washington, D.C.

== Political career ==
=== Policy positions ===
During his 2007–08 presidential campaign, Edwards promoted programs to eliminate poverty in the United States, including arguing in favor of creating one million housing vouchers over five years in order to place poor people in middle-class neighborhoods. Edwards stated, "If we truly believe that we are all equal, then we should live together too." He also supported "College for Everyone" initiatives. Although Edwards initially supported the Iraq War, he later changed his position and in November 2005 wrote an op-ed in The Washington Post in which he said he expressed regret for voting for the Iraq War Resolution and discussed three solutions for success in the conflict. He denounced the "troop surge" in Iraq, was a proponent for withdrawal, and urged Congress to withhold funding for the war without a withdrawal timetable.

On social policy, Edwards supported abortion rights and had a universal healthcare plan that required all Americans to purchase healthcare insurance, required that "everybody get preventive care", and required employers to provide health care insurance or be taxed to fund public health care. He supported a pathway to citizenship for undocumented immigrants, opposed to a constitutional amendment banning same-sex marriage; and supported the repeal of the Defense of Marriage Act (DOMA).

Edwards endorsed efforts to slow down global warming and was the first presidential candidate to describe his campaign as carbon-neutral.

=== Senate tenure ===
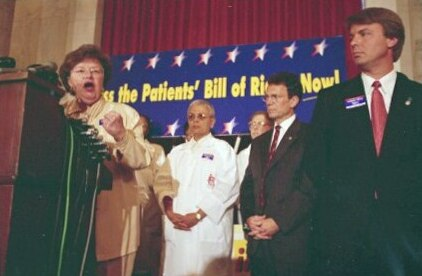
Edwards, Barbara Mikulski, and Tom Daschle at a rally urging the passing of the Democrats' health care package, the Patients' Bill of Rights (1999).

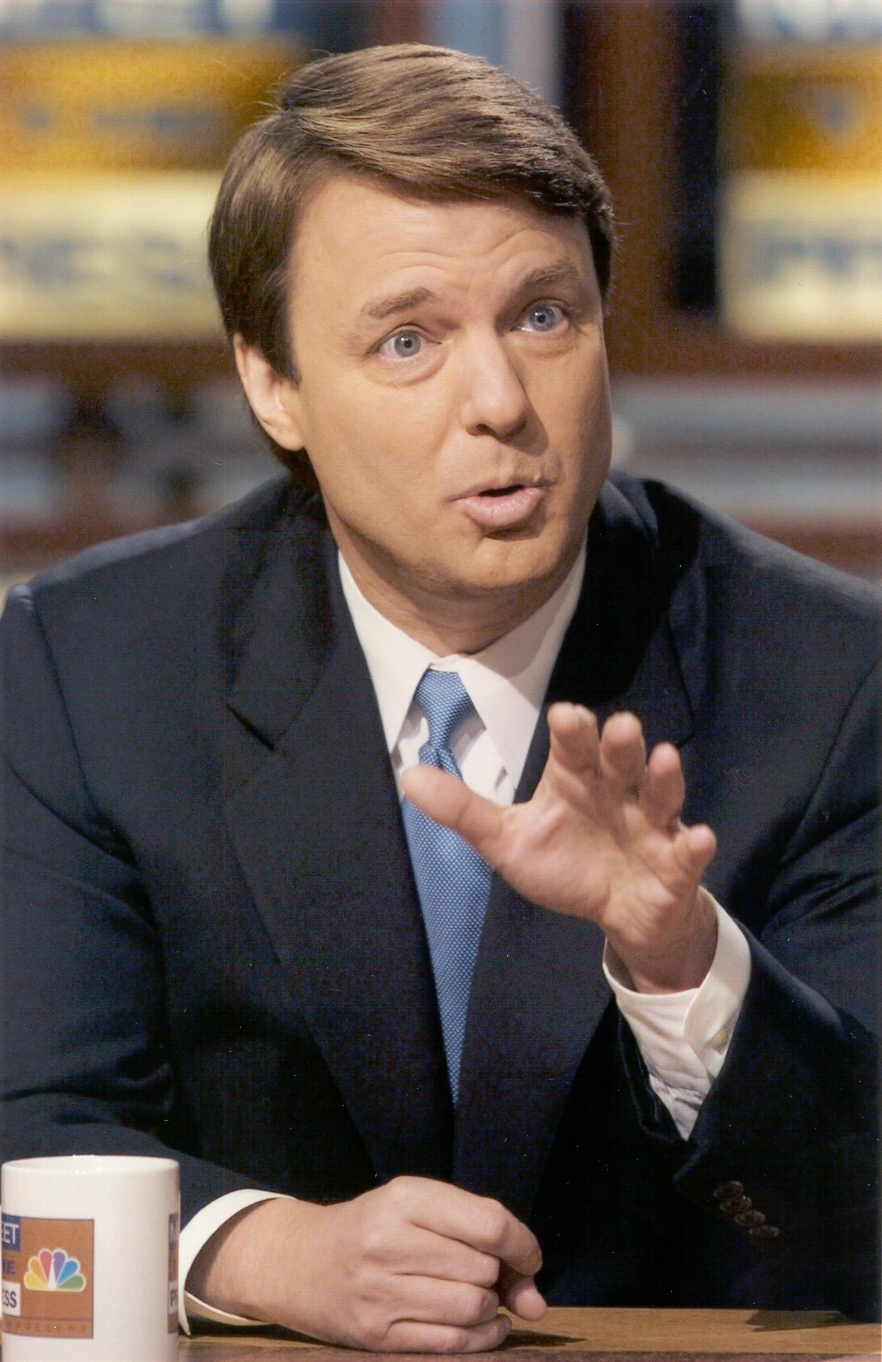
Senator Edwards on Meet the Press

Edwards won election to the U.S. Senate in 1998 as a Democrat running against incumbent Republican Senator Lauch Faircloth. Despite originally being the underdog, Edwards beat Faircloth by 51.2% to 47.0% — a margin of some 83,000 votes. He served alongside fellow Republican Senator Jesse Helms until Helms left office in 2003, having chosen to not seek reelection in 2002.

During President Bill Clinton's 1999 impeachment trial in the Senate, Edwards was responsible for the deposition of witnesses Monica Lewinsky and fellow Democrat Vernon Jordan, Jr. During the 2000 presidential campaign, Edwards was on Democratic nominee Al Gore's vice presidential nominee short list (along with John Kerry and Joe Lieberman, Gore's eventual pick).

In his time in the Senate, Edwards co-sponsored 203 bills. Among them was Lieberman's 2002 Iraq War Resolution (S.J.Res.46), which he co-sponsored along with 15 other senators, but which did not go to a vote. He voted for replacement resolution (H.J Res. 114) in the full Senate to authorize the use of military force against Iraq, which passed by a vote of 77 to 23, On October 10, 2002, he stated that:

"Almost no one disagrees with these basic facts: that Saddam Hussein is a tyrant and a menace; that he has weapons of mass destruction and that he is doing everything in his power to get nuclear weapons; that he has supported terrorists; that he is a grave threat to the region, to vital allies like Israel, and to the United States; and that he is thwarting the will of the international community and undermining the United Nations' credibility."

On October 10, 2004, Edwards further defended his vote during an appearance on Meet the Press:

"I would have voted for the resolution knowing what I know today, because it was the right thing to do to give the president the authority to confront Saddam Hussein ... I think Saddam Hussein was a very serious threat. I stand by that, and that's why [John Kerry and I] stand behind our vote on the resolution."

Edwards subsequently changed his mind about the war and apologized for that military authorization vote. Edwards also voted in favor of the Patriot Act.

Among other positions, Edwards was generally pro-choice and supported affirmative action and the death penalty. One of his first sponsored bills was the Fragile X Research Breakthrough Act of 1999. He was also the first person to introduce comprehensive anti-spyware legislation with the Spyware Control and Privacy Protection Act. He advocated rolling back the Bush administration's tax cuts and ending mandatory minimum sentencing for non-violent offenders. Edwards generally supported expanding legal immigration to the United States while working with Mexico to provide better border security and stop illegal trafficking.

Edwards served on the U.S. Senate Select Committee on Intelligence, the U.S. Senate Committee on Judiciary, and was a member of the New Democrat Coalition.

Before the 2004 Senate election, Edwards announced his retirement from the Senate and supported Erskine Bowles, former White House Chief of Staff, as the successor to his seat; Bowles was defeated by Republican Richard Burr in the election.

=== Post-Senate activities ===
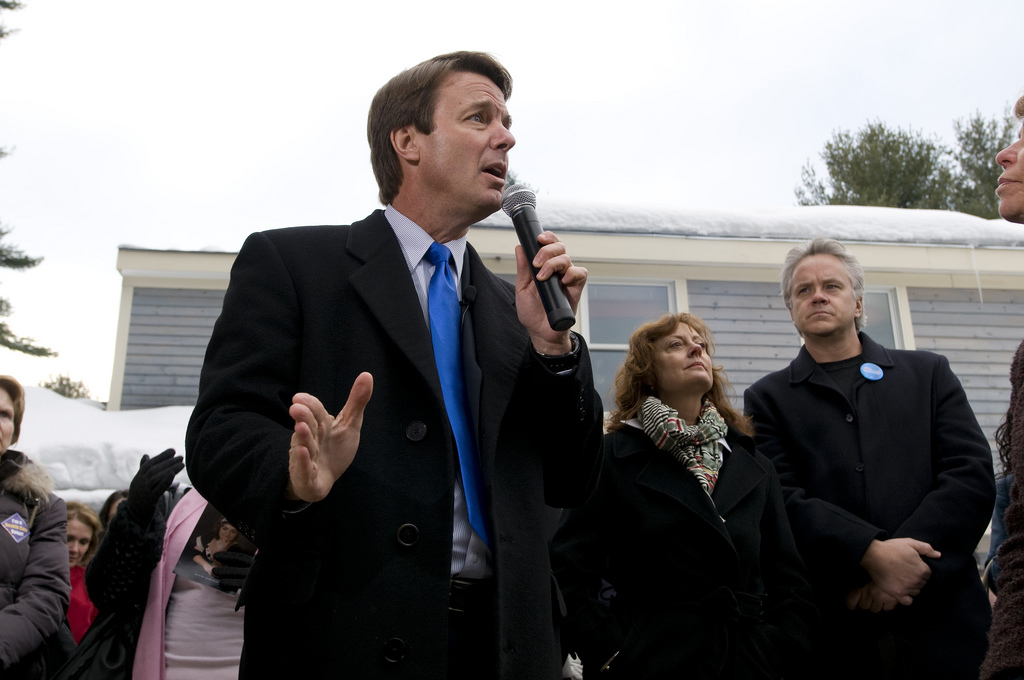
Susan Sarandon and Tim Robbins appear alongside Edwards at a presidential campaign rally in 2008

The day after his concession speech, he announced his wife Elizabeth had been diagnosed with breast cancer. Edwards told interviewer Larry King that he doubted he would return to practice as a trial lawyer and showed no interest in succeeding Terry McAuliffe as the Democratic National Committee chairman.

In February 2005, Edwards headlined the "100 Club" Dinner, a major fundraiser for the New Hampshire Democratic Party. That same month, Edwards was appointed as director of the Center on Poverty, Work and Opportunity at the University of North Carolina at Chapel Hill for studying ways to move people out of poverty. That fall, Edwards toured ten major universities in order to promote "Opportunity Rocks!", a program aimed at getting youth involved to fight poverty.

On March 21, 2005, Edwards recorded his first podcast with his wife. Several months later, in August, Edwards delivered an address to a potential key supporter in the Iowa caucus, the AFL–CIO in Waterloo, Iowa.

In the following month, Edwards sent an email to his supporters and announced that he opposed the nomination of Judge John G. Roberts to become Chief Justice of the United States. He was also opposed to the nomination of Justice Samuel Alito as an Associate Justice and Judge Charles Pickering's appointment to the Federal bench.

During the summer and fall of 2005, he visited homeless shelters and job training centers and spoke at events organized by ACORN, the NAACP and the SEIU. He spoke in favor of an expansion of the earned income tax credit; in favor of a crackdown on predatory lending; an increase in the capital gains tax rate; housing vouchers for racial minorities (to integrate upper-income neighborhoods); and a program modeled on the Works Progress Administration to rehabilitate the Gulf Coast following Hurricane Katrina. In Greene County, North Carolina, he unveiled the pilot program for College for Everyone, an educational measure he promised during his presidential campaign, in which prospective college students would receive a scholarship for their first year in exchange for ten hours of work a week. The College for Everyone program was canceled in July 2008.

Edwards was co-chair of a Council on Foreign Relations task force on United States-Russia relations alongside Republican Jack Kemp, a former congressman, Cabinet official and vice presidential nominee. The task force issued its report in March 2006. On July 12, the International Herald Tribune published a related op-ed by Edwards and Kemp.

In October 2005, Edwards joined the Wall Street investment firm Fortress Investment Group as a senior adviser and consultant, a position for which a close aide reported he received an annual salary of $500,000. Fortress owned a major stake in Green Tree Servicing LLC, which rose to prominence in the 1990s selling subprime loans to mobile-home owners and now services subprime loans originated by others, but in an interview Edwards said he was unaware of this. Subprime loans allow buyers with poor credit histories to be funded, but they charge higher rates because of the risk, and sometimes carry hidden fees and increased charges over time. In August 2007, The Wall Street Journal reported that a portion of the Edwards family's assets were invested in Fortress Investment Group, which had, in turn, invested a portion of its assets in subprime mortgage lenders, some of which had foreclosed on the homes of Hurricane Katrina victims. Upon learning of Fortress's investments, Edwards divested funds and stated that he would try to help the affected families. Edwards later helped set up an ACORN-administered "Louisiana Home Rescue Fund" seeded with $100,000, much of it from his pocket, to provide loans and grants to the families who were foreclosed on by Fortress-owned lenders.

As of 2014, Edwards was a personal injury lawyer in Pitt County, North Carolina. He was invited to and attended the 2024 Democratic National Convention, which was the first DNC he attended since his Vice-Presidential nomination in Boston, twenty years earlier.

== Political campaigns ==
=== Electoral history ===
1998 North Carolina U.S. Senate Election (Democratic Primary)
Party	Candidate	Votes	%
Democratic	John Edwards	277,468	51.39%
Democratic	D.G. Martin	149,049	27.59%
Democratic	Ella Butler Scarborough	55,486	10.28%
Total votes		482,003	100.00%

1998 North Carolina U.S. Senate Election (General Election)
Party	Candidate	Votes	%
Democratic	John Edwards	1,029,237	51.15%
Republican	Lauch Faircloth (inc.)	945,943	47.01%
Libertarian	Barbara Howe	36,963	1.84%
Total votes		2,012,143	100.00%

2004 Democratic Party presidential primaries
Party	Candidate	Votes	%
Democratic	John Kerry	10,045,891	60.75%
Democratic	John Edwards	3,207,048	19.39%
Democratic	Howard Dean	937,015	5.67%
Democratic	Dennis Kucinich	643,067	3.89%
Democratic	Wesley Clark	572,207	3.46%
Democratic	Al Sharpton	383,683	2.32%
Democratic	Uncommitted	155,388	0.94%
Democratic	Others	591,524	3.58%
Total votes		16,535,823	100.00%

2004 United States presidential election
Party	Candidate	Votes	%
Republican	George W. Bush / Dick Cheney (inc.)	62,040,610	50.73%
Democratic	John Kerry / John Edwards	59,028,444	48.27%
Independent	Ralph Nader / Peter Camejo	465,650	0.38%
Libertarian	Michael Badnarik / Richard Campagna	397,265	0.32%
Constitution	Michael Peroutka / Chuck Baldwin	143,630	0.12%
Green	David Cobb / Pat LaMarche	119,859	0.10%
	Others	95,172	0.08%
Total votes		122,295,345	100.00%
Republican hold			

2008 Democratic Presidential Primaries
Party	Candidate	Votes	%
Democratic	Barack Obama	16,706,853	49.04%
Democratic	Hillary Clinton	16,239,821	47.67%
Democratic	John Edwards	1,006,275	2.65%
Democratic	Uncommitted	299,610	2.79%
Democratic	Bill Richardson	106,073	0.28%
Democratic	Dennis Kucinich	103,994	0.27%
Democratic	Joe Biden	81,641	0.22%
Democratic	Scattering	44,348	0.12%
Democratic	Mike Gravel	40,251	0.11%
Democratic	Christopher Dodd	35,281	0.09%
Total votes		37,980,830	100.00%

=== 2004 presidential campaign ===
In 2000, Edwards unofficially began his presidential campaign when he began to seek speaking engagements in Iowa, the site of the nation's first party caucuses. On January 2, 2003, Edwards began fundraising without officially campaigning by forming an exploratory committee. On September 15, 2003, Edwards fulfilled a promise he made a year earlier as a guest on The Daily Show with Jon Stewart to unofficially announce his intention to seek the 2004 Democratic presidential nomination. The next morning, Edwards made the announcement officially from his hometown. He declined to run for reelection to the Senate in order to focus on his presidential run. Edwards's campaign was chaired by North Carolina Democratic activist Ed Turlington.

As Edwards had been building support essentially since his election to the Senate, he led the initial campaign fundraising, amassing over $7 million during the first quarter of 2003 – more than half of which came from individuals associated with the legal profession, particularly Edwards's fellow trial lawyers, their families, and employees. Edwards's stump speech spoke of "Two Americas", with one composed of the wealthy and privileged, and the other of the hard-working common man, causing the media to often characterize Edwards as a populist.

Edwards struggled to gain substantial support, but his poll numbers began to rise steadily weeks before the Iowa caucuses. In these he had a surprising second-place finish with the support of 32% of delegates, behind only John Kerry's 39% and ahead of former front-runner Howard Dean at 18%. One week later in the New Hampshire primary, Edwards finished in fourth place behind Kerry, Dean and Wesley Clark, with 12%. During the February 3 primaries, Edwards won the South Carolina primary, lost to Clark in Oklahoma, and lost to Kerry in the other states. Edwards garnered the second-largest number of second-place finishes, again falling behind Clark.

Edwards speaking at Nashua, New Hampshire, November 7th 2003

Dean withdrew from the contest, leaving Edwards the only major challenger to Kerry. In the Wisconsin primary on February 17, Edwards finished second to Kerry with 34% of the vote. He largely avoided attacking Kerry until a February 29, 2004, debate in New York, in which he characterized him as a "Washington insider" and mocked Kerry's plan to form a committee to examine trade agreements.

In the Super Tuesday primaries on March 2, Kerry finished well ahead in nine of the ten states voting, and Edwards's campaign ended. In Georgia, Edwards finished only slightly behind Kerry but, failing to win a single state, chose to withdraw from the race. He announced his official withdrawal at a press conference in Raleigh, North Carolina, on March 3. Edwards's withdrawal made major media outlets relatively early on the evening of Super Tuesday, at about 6:30 pm CST, before polls had closed in California and before caucuses in Minnesota had even begun. It is thought that the withdrawal influenced many people in Minnesota to vote for other candidates, which may partially account for the strong Minnesota finish of Dennis Kucinich. Edwards did win the presidential straw poll conducted by the Independence Party of Minnesota.

After withdrawing from the race, he went on to win the April 17 Democratic caucuses in his home state of North Carolina, making him the only Democratic candidate besides Kerry to win nominating contests in two states in 2004.

=== 2004 vice presidential nomination ===
On July 6, 2004, Kerry announced that Edwards would be his running mate; the decision was widely hailed in public opinion polls and by Democratic leaders. Though many Democrats supported Edwards's nomination, others criticized the selection for Edwards's perceived lack of experience. In the vice presidential debate, Dick Cheney told Edwards they had never met because of Edwards's frequent absences from the Senate, but that was later proven to be incorrect. Videotape later surfaced of Cheney and Edwards shaking hands off-camera during a taping of Meet the Press on April 8, 2001. On February 1, 2001, Cheney thanked Edwards by name and sat with him during a Senate prayer breakfast. George W. Bush's campaign spokesman Steve Schmidt described the event as an "inconsequential meeting". On January 8, 2003, they met when John Edwards accompanied then-Senator Elizabeth Dole to her swearing-in while Cheney was President of the Senate.

Kerry's campaign advisor Bob Shrum later reported in Time magazine that Kerry said he wished he had never picked Edwards, and the two have since stopped speaking to each other. Edwards said in his concession speech, "You can be disappointed, but you cannot walk away. This fight has just begun."

=== 2008 presidential campaign ===
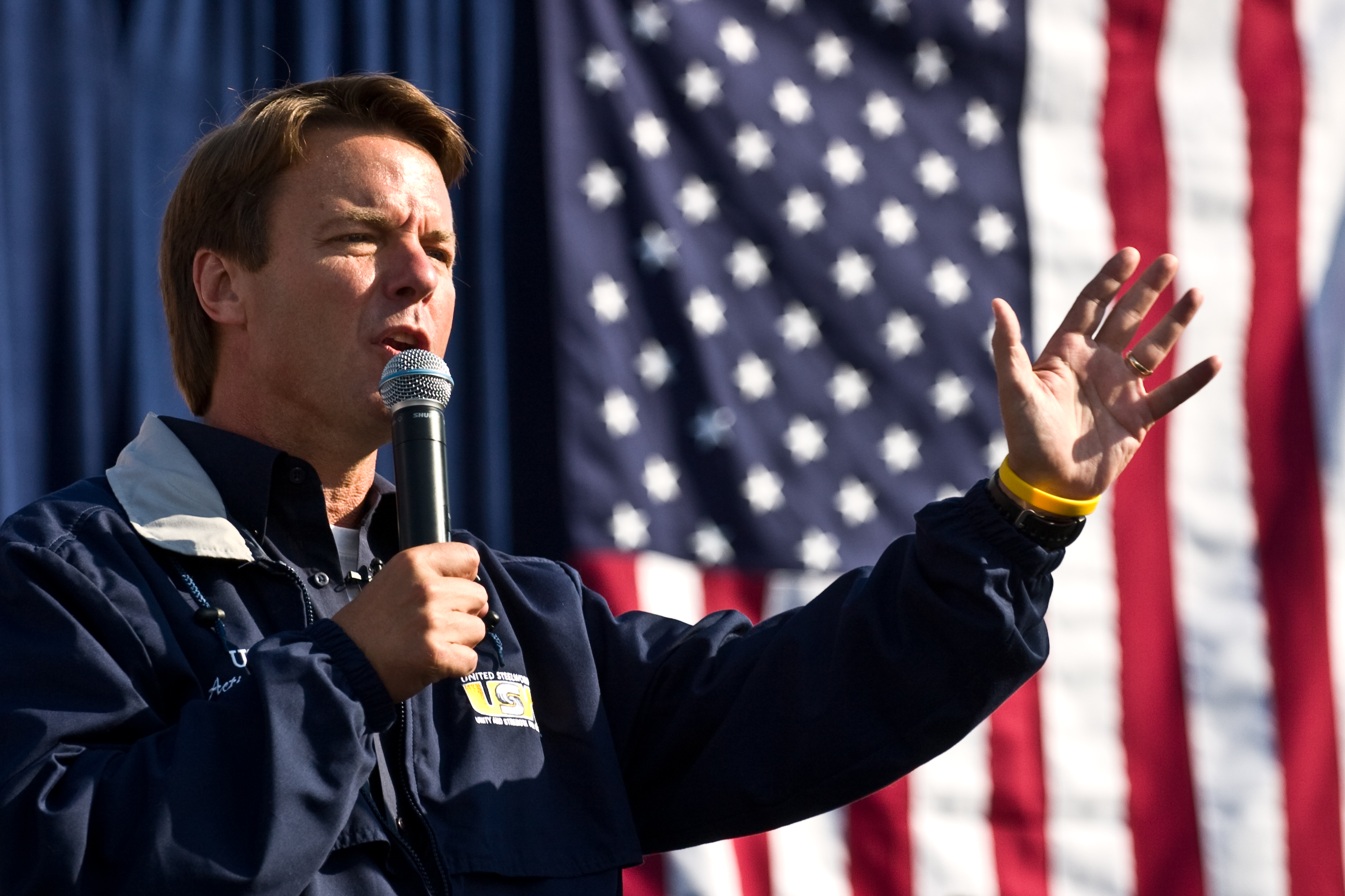
John Edwards campaigning in Pittsburgh, Pennsylvania on Labor Day in 2007

On December 28, 2006, John Edwards officially announced his candidacy for President in the 2008 election from the yard of a home in New Orleans, Louisiana, that was being rebuilt after Hurricane Katrina destroyed it. Edwards stated that his main goals were eliminating poverty, fighting global warming, providing universal health care, and withdrawing troops from Iraq.

National polls had Edwards placing third among the Democratic field beginning in January 2007, behind Senator Hillary Clinton and Senator Barack Obama. By July 2007, the Edwards campaign had raised $23 million from nearly 100,000 donors, placing him behind Obama and Clinton in fundraising.

Edwards was first to boycott a Fox News-sponsored presidential debate in March 2007. Hillary Clinton, Bill Richardson, and Barack Obama followed suit.

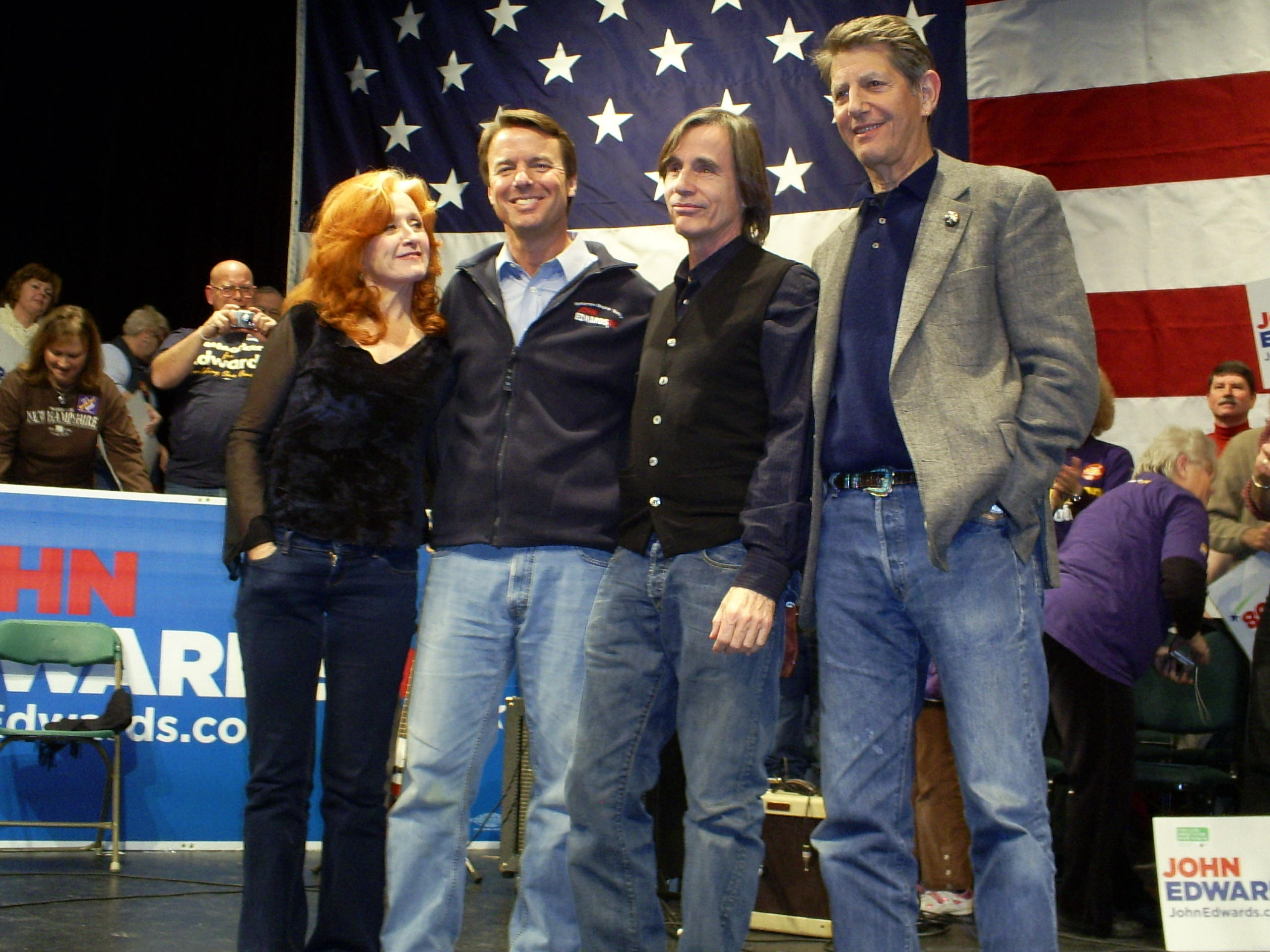
John Edwards with Bonnie Raitt, Jackson Browne, and Peter Coyote at a campaign event in Manchester, New Hampshire

On January 3, 2008, in the Iowa caucuses, the first contest of the nomination process, Edwards placed second with 29.75% of the vote to Obama (37.58%), with Clinton coming in third with 29.47% of the vote. On January 8, Edwards placed a distant third in the New Hampshire Democratic primary with just under 17% (48,818 votes). On January 26, Edwards again placed third in the primary in South Carolina – his birth state – which he had carried in 2004, and he placed third in the non-binding January 29 vote in Florida.

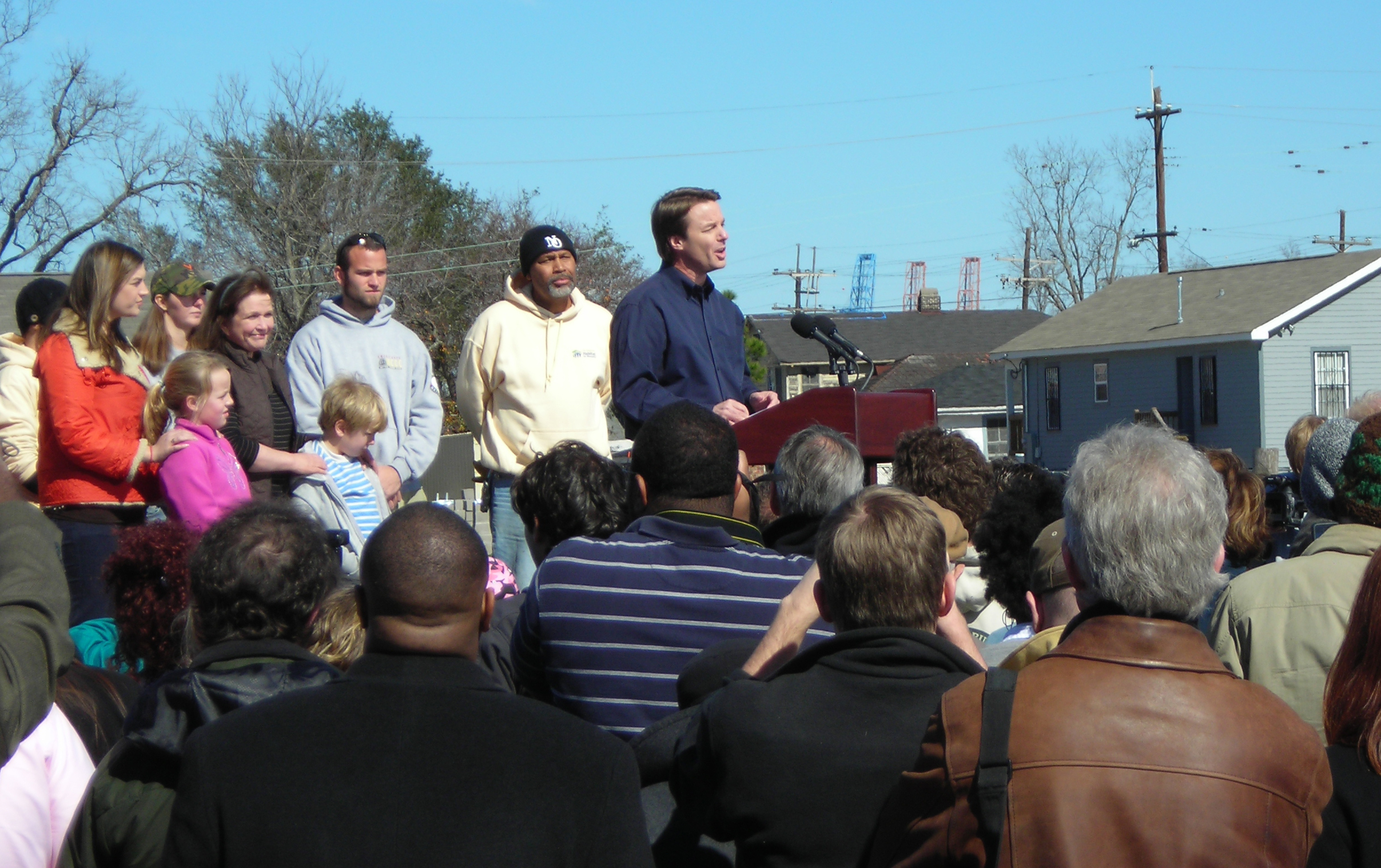
At the Musicians' Village in New Orleans, Edwards announced the suspension of his campaign.

On January 30, 2008, following his primary and caucus losses, Edwards announced that he was suspending his campaign for the presidency. He did not initially endorse either Clinton or Obama, saying they both had pledged to carry forward his central campaign theme of ending poverty in America. In April 2008, he stated that he would not accept the 2008 vice presidential slot if asked. On May 14, 2008, Edwards officially endorsed Senator Obama at a rally in Grand Rapids, Michigan.

On June 15, 2008, Edwards stepped back from his initial outright denial of interest in the position of Vice President, saying, "I'd take anything he asks me to think about seriously, but obviously this is something that I've done and it's not a job I'm seeking." On June 20, 2008, the Associated Press reported that according to a member of the Congressional Black Caucus, the names of Edwards and Sam Nunn were on Obama's vice presidential shortlist. Ultimately, then-Senator Joe Biden of Delaware was tapped to become Obama's running mate.

== Personal life ==
=== Family ===
While at UNC, he met Elizabeth Anania. They married in 1977 and had four children (Wade in 1979, Cate in 1982, Emma Claire in 1998, and Jack in 2000). In a widely-publicized extramarital affair, he fathered a daughter in 2008 with Rielle Hunter, a staffer on his 2008 presidential campaign. Edwards denied being the father until 2010.

Wade was killed in a car accident when strong winds swept his Jeep off a North Carolina highway in 1996. Three weeks before his death, he was honored by First Lady Hillary Clinton at The White House as one of the 10 finalists in an essay contest sponsored by the National Endowment for the Humanities and the Voice of America for an essay he wrote on entering the voting booth with his father. Wade, accompanied by his parents and sister, went on to meet North Carolina Sen. Jesse Helms, who later entered Wade's essay and his obituary into the Congressional Record. Edwards and his wife began the Wade Edwards Foundation in their son's memory; the purpose of the non-profit organization is "to reward, encourage, and inspire young people in the pursuit of excellence." The foundation funded the Wade Edwards Learning Lab at Wade's high school, Needham B. Broughton High School in Raleigh, along with scholarship competitions and essay awards.

On November 3, 2004, Elizabeth Edwards revealed that she had been diagnosed with breast cancer. She was treated by chemotherapy and radiotherapy, and continued to work within the Democratic Party and her husband's One America Committee. On March 22, 2007, during his campaign for the 2008 Democratic nomination for the presidency, Edwards and his wife announced that her cancer had returned; she was diagnosed with stage IV breast cancer, with newly discovered metastases to the bone and possibly to her lung. They said that the cancer was "no longer curable, but is completely treatable" and that they planned to continue campaigning together with an occasional break when she required treatment.

In June 2010, Elizabeth published a book called Resilience. Her book is about the struggles of her marriage and how she was affected by her husband's affair. In the book, Elizabeth talks about how long she was in the dark about the affair and how many times her husband lied about the details of the affair. She never addresses John's mistress by name but calls her a "parasitic groupie" and claims that she is "pathetic". Elizabeth also opens up about how she tried to forgive her husband after she first learned of the affair but struggled to find forgiveness when he continued to lie. After Edwards's January 21, 2010, admission that he fathered a child with his mistress, Elizabeth obtained a legal separation from him and intended to file for divorce after a mandatory one-year waiting period.

On December 7, 2010, Elizabeth died of metastatic breast cancer, aged 61. Edwards was present at her funeral, but did not speak.

=== Residence ===
In Washington, D.C., Edwards lived on Embassy Row, at 2215 30th Street NW. In 2004, he sold his house to the Hungarian Embassy to the United States.

=== Extramarital affair ===
In October 2007, The National Enquirer began a series of reports alleging an adulterous affair between Edwards and former campaign worker Rielle Hunter. By July 2008, several news media outlets speculated that Edwards's chances for the vice presidency as well as other positions such as the attorney general were harmed by the allegations, which now included that he fathered a child with Hunter and had visited her and the baby girl at the Beverly Hilton Hotel in Beverly Hills, California. The story was not widely covered by the press for some time, until, after initially denying the allegations, Edwards admitted the affair.

In an August 8, 2008, statement, and an interview with Bob Woodruff of ABC News, Edwards admitted the affair with Hunter in 2006, but denied being the father of her child. He acknowledged that he had been dishonest in denying the entire Enquirer story, admitting that some of it was true, but said that the affair ended long before the time of the child's conception. He further said he was willing to take a paternity test, but Hunter responded that she would not be party to a DNA test "now or in the future". Initially, campaign aide Andrew Young claimed that he, not Edwards, was the child's father. Young later renounced that statement, instead alleging that Edwards always knew he was the child's father and had pleaded with him to falsely accept responsibility.

Young further claimed to have set up private meetings between Edwards and Hunter, and that Edwards once calmed an anxious Hunter by promising her that after his wife died he would marry her in a rooftop ceremony in New York with an appearance by the Dave Matthews Band. Young also maintains that Edwards asked him to "Get a doctor to fake the DNA results ... and to steal a diaper from the baby so he could secretly do a DNA test to find out if this [was] indeed his child."

On January 21, 2010, John Edwards issued a press release to admit that he fathered Hunter's child. On February 2, 2010, Young released a book detailing the affair. Young also began working with Aaron Sorkin on a movie about the affair based on the book The Politician. On February 23, 2012, an Orange County, North Carolina, judge ruled that Young and his wife could not publicize the movie. The judge also ruled that an alleged "sex tape" of Edwards and Hunter be destroyed by the court. The judge also allowed only the materials already in the public domain to be used for public purposes. All other photos and materials not yet released can be used for family purposes only.

Reports surfaced in late 2011 in The National Enquirer and RadarOnline.com that Edwards asked his former mistress to move into his North Carolina home, where he had once lived with his wife. In 2012, Rielle Hunter announced her breakup with Edwards the same day she released a book about their relationship.

In response to the scandal involving Edwards's extramarital affair and attempts to cover it up, he has stated "I am a sinner, but not a criminal."

=== Legal troubles ===
In May 2009, newspapers reported that Edwards's campaign was being investigated for conversion of campaign money to personal use related to the affair. Edwards said that the campaign was complying with the inquiry. The relevant US attorney refused to comment. In the same month, George Stephanopoulos of ABC News reported that members of Edwards's staff had told him that they had planned a "doomsday strategy" to derail Edwards's campaign if he got close to the nomination. Joe Trippi, a senior advisor to the campaign, said the report was "complete bullshit". In August 2009, Rielle Hunter appeared before the grand jury investigating this matter. On March 15, 2010, Hunter broke her silence during an interview with GQ magazine and provided new details about the affair. In March 2011, voicemail messages allegedly left by John Edwards were obtained, which Young says prove that Edwards arranged the cover-up of his affair with Hunter.

On May 24, 2011, ABC News and the New York Times reported that the U.S. Department of Justice's Public Integrity Section had conducted a two-year investigation into whether Edwards had used more than $1 million in political donations to hide his affair and planned to pursue criminal charges for alleged violations of campaign finance laws.

On June 3, 2011, Edwards was indicted by a federal grand jury in North Carolina on six felony charges, including four counts of collecting illegal campaign contributions, one count of conspiracy, and one count of making false statements.

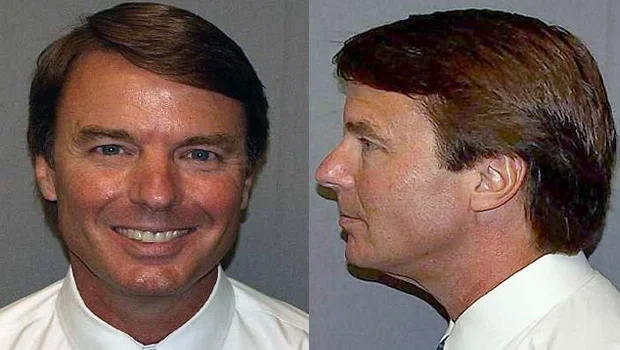
Edwards' infamous smiling mugshot, taken on 3 June 2011

After postponing the start of the trial while Edwards was treated for a heart condition in February 2012, Judge Catherine Eagles of the U.S. District Court for the Middle District of North Carolina scheduled jury selection to begin on April 12, 2012. Edwards's trial began on April 23, 2012, as he faced up to 30 years in prison and a $1.5 million fine.

In a related development, on March 13, 2012, the Federal Election Commission ruled that Edwards's campaign must repay $2.1 million in matching federal funds. Edwards's lawyers claimed the money was used, and that the campaign did not receive all the funds to which it was entitled, but the Commission rejected the arguments.

Twelve jurors and four alternates were seated, and opening arguments began April 23, 2012. Closing arguments took place May 17, and the case went to the jury the next day.

On May 31, 2012, Edwards was found not guilty on Count 3, illegal use of campaign funding (contributions from Rachel "Bunny" Mellon), while mistrials were declared on all other counts against him. On June 13, 2012, the Justice Department announced that it dropped the charges and would not attempt to retry Edwards.

== Return to law practice ==
After his political career ended, Edwards, along with attorneys David Kirby and William Bystrynski, founded the law firm Edwards Kirby in Raleigh, specializing in medical malpractice cases. In 2015, his daughter Cate was the managing attorney of the San Diego office of the firm.

== Books ==
- Four Trials (with John Auchard) (New York: Simon and Schuster, 2003) ISBN 0-7432-4497-4
- Home: The Blueprints of Our Lives (New York: Collins, 2006) ISBN 0-06-088454-1
- Ending Poverty in America: How to Restore the American Dream, co-editor (New Press, 2007) ISBN 1-59558-176-6

== See also ==
- List of federal political sex scandals in the United States
- Two Americas
- 2008 United States presidential election
- 2008 Democratic Party presidential candidates
- Opinion polling for the Democratic Party (United States) presidential primaries, 2008
- Democratic presidential debates, 2008

Party political offices
Preceded by Terry Sanford	Democratic nominee for U.S. Senator from North Carolina (Class 3); 1998	Succeeded by Erskine Bowles
Preceded by Joe Lieberman	Democratic nominee for Vice President of the United States; 2004	Succeeded by Joe Biden
U.S. Senate
Preceded by Lauch Faircloth	U.S. Senator (Class 3) from North Carolina; 1999–2005; Served alongside: Jesse Helms, Elizabeth Dole	Succeeded by Richard Burr
U.S. order of precedence (ceremonial)
Preceded by Jim Webb as Former U.S. Senator	Order of precedence of the United States	Succeeded by Joe Donnelly as Former U.S. Senator
