= Walter E. Johnston III =

American politician

Gene Johnston
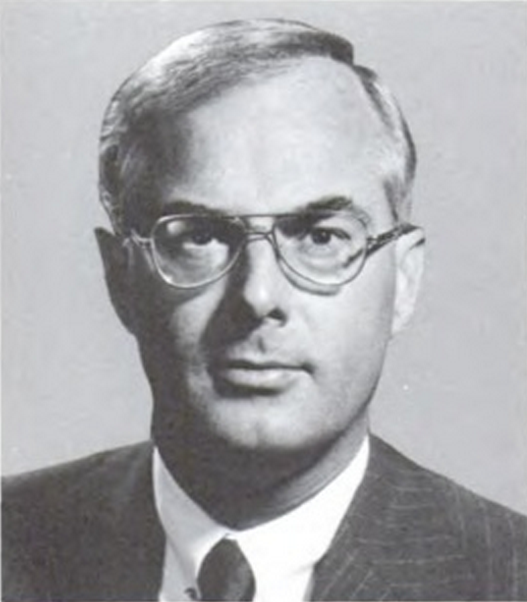

Member of the U.S. House of Representatives from North Carolina's 6th district
- In office January 3, 1981 – January 3, 1983
- Preceded by: L. Richardson Preyer
- Succeeded by: Robin Britt

Personal details
- Born: Walter Eugene Johnston III; March 3, 1936 Winston-Salem, North Carolina, U.S.
- Died: March 28, 2018 (aged 82) St. Petersburg, Florida, U.S.
- Party: Republican
- Education: Duke University; Wake Forest University (BS, JD)

Military service
- Allegiance: United States
- Branch/service: United States Army
- Years of service: 1954–1957

Walter Eugene Johnston III (March 3, 1936 – March 28, 2018), usually known as Gene Johnston, was an American politician who served as a member of the United States House of Representatives from North Carolina between 1981 and 1983.

== Biography ==
Johnston was born in Winston-Salem, North Carolina, and attended local public schools. He graduated from the Georgia Military Academy in 1953, and then enrolled as a student at Duke University for one year before entering into the armed forces. He served in the United States Army, Specialist Five from 1954 to 1957. He returned to school at Wake Forest University, earning a degree in accounting, and returning to receive a Juris Doctor. He was admitted to the North Carolina bar in 1961 and commenced practice in Greensboro, North Carolina. Johnston practiced tax law from 1967 to 1980. He was employed as a CPA by A.M Pullen & Co. in the early 1960s.

Johnston was elected as a Republican to the 97th Congress in the 1980 elections, defeating 12-year incumbent Rich Preyer by a narrow 4,000-vote margin. He was likely helped by Ronald Reagan carrying his Greensboro-based district. However, he was an unsuccessful candidate for reelection in 1982, losing his bid to Robin Britt. Johnston served as North Carolina Chairman for the Reagan/Bush reelection Committee in 1984 and a delegate to the Republican National Convention. Afterward, he became chairman of the board of a commercial printing company in Greensboro and chairman of Pace Communications a large commercial publisher. Johnston was an unsuccessful candidate in 1992 for the Republican nomination for the United States Senate. He ultimately retired from politics and resided in Greensboro and St. Petersburg, Florida.

In 1992, he was appointed to the Board of the Piedmont Triad Airport Authority and subsequently was elected its chairman. In 1996 the authority successfully recruited a Federal Express sorting facility and hub. Johnston remains an underwriting member of Lloyd's of London, a position he has held since 1977. Governor James Martin appointed Johnston to the Advisory Budget Commission for the State of North Carolina in 1985, and also appointed him to the Global Transpark Authority.

Johnston had three sons, one daughter and many grandchildren. He died from congestive heart failure on March 28, 2018, at the age of 82.

== Sources ==
- United States Congress. "Walter E. Johnston III (id: J000200)". Biographical Directory of the United States Congress.
- Appearances on C-SPAN

U.S. House of Representatives
Preceded by L. Richardson Preyer	Member of the U.S. House of Representatives from North Carolina's 6th congressional district 1981–1983	Succeeded by Robin Britt
